= List of open clusters =

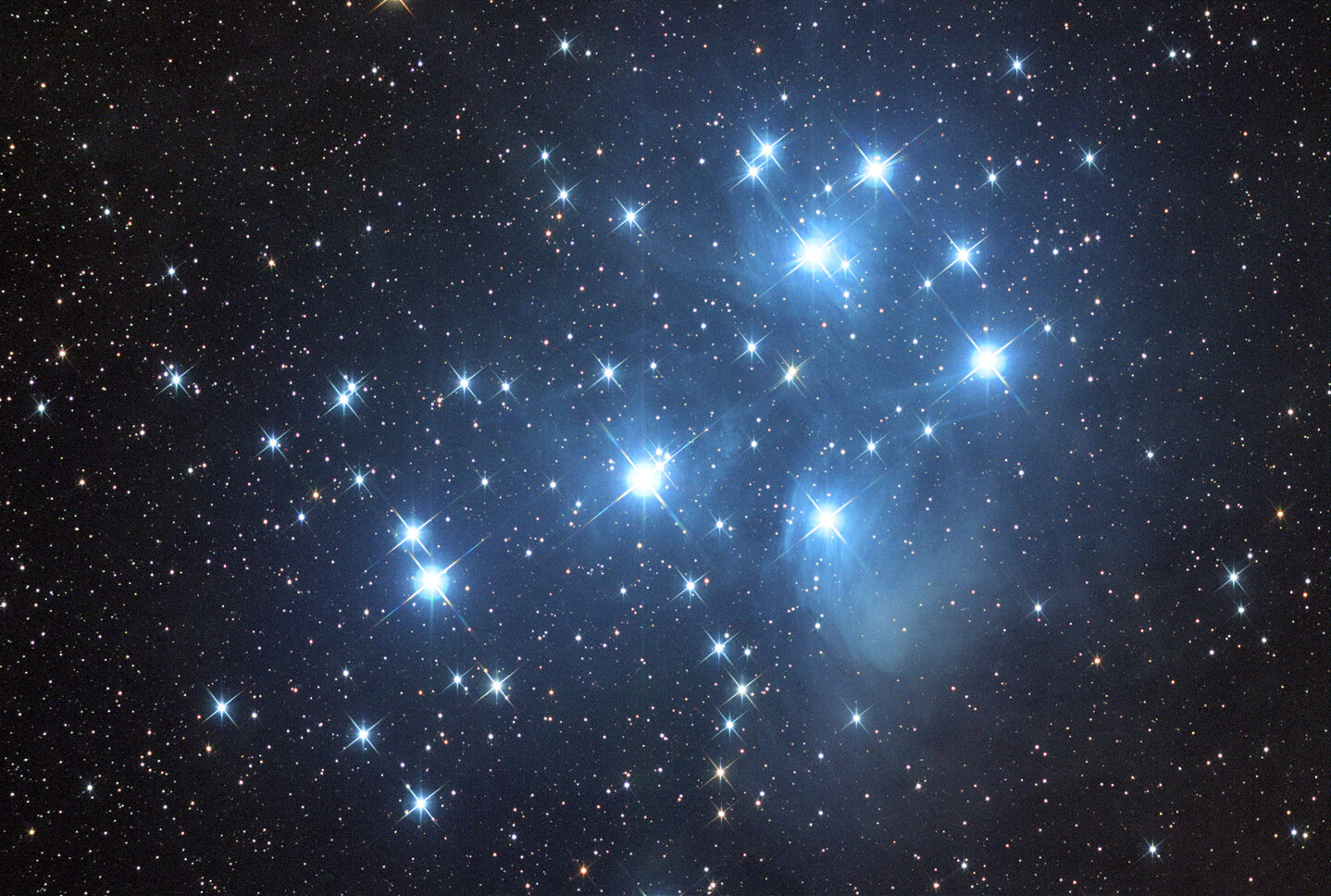
Image of open cluster Pleiades also known as Messier 45

This is a list of open clusters located in the Milky Way. An open cluster is an association of up to a few thousand stars that all formed from the same giant molecular cloud. There are over 1,000 known open clusters in the Milky Way galaxy, but the actual total may be up to ten times higher. The estimated half-lives of clusters, after which half the original cluster members will have been lost, range from 150 million to 800 million years, depending on the original density.

== Table ==
=== Milky Way ===
Known and candidate Milky Way open clusters
Cluster identifier	Image	Epoch J2000		Constellation	Distance (Light-years)	Age (Myr)	Diameter	Apparent magnitude	Notes
Cluster identifier	Image	R. A.	Dec.	Constellation	Distance (Light-years)	Age (Myr)	Diameter	Apparent magnitude	Notes
Hyades		04^{h} 26.9^{m}	+15° 52′	Taurus	153	625	330'	0.5	
Coma Star Cluster		12^{h} 22.5^{m}	+25° 51′	Coma Berenices	280	400–500	120'	1.8	
Coronet Cluster		19^{h} 01^{m} 54.00^{s}	−36° 57′ 12.0″	Corona Australis	420–550			8.0	
Pleiades (Messier 45)		03^{h} 47.4^{m}	+24° 07′	Taurus	444	125	120'	1.2	
IC 2602 (Southern Pleiades)		10^{h} 43.2^{m}	−64° 24′	Carina	486	30	100'	1.9	
Alpha Persei Cluster		03^{h} 26.0^{m}	+49° 07′	Perseus	570	50	300'	1.2	
IC 2391 (Omicron Velorum Cluster)		08^{h} 40.6^{m}	−53° 02′	Vela	574	30	60'	2.5	
NGC 2451 A		07^{h} 45.4^{m}	−37° 58′	Puppis	600	50	45'	2.8	
Messier 44 (Beehive Cluster)		08^{h} 40.4^{m}	+19° 41′	Cancer	610	830	70'	3.1	
Melotte 186		18^{h} 01.1^{m}	+02° 54′	Ophiuchus	652	100	240'	3.0	
Blanco 1		00^{h} 04.3^{m}	−29° 56′	Sculptor	850+160 −130	100	90'	4.5	
Messier 7 (Ptolemy's Cluster)		17^{h} 53.8^{m}	−34° 47′	Scorpius	980 ± 33	224	80'	3.3	
Messier 39 (Pyramid Cluster)		21^{h} 31.8^{m}	+48° 27′	Cygnus	1,010	280	30'	4.6	
IC 348		03^{h} 44.6^{m}	+32° 10′	Perseus	1,028	44	7'	7.3	
NGC 6633		18^{h} 27.7^{m}	+06° 34′	Ophiuchus	1,040	660	20'	4.6	
Pi Puppis Cluster		07^{h} 08^{m}	−37° 10′	Puppis	1,040.5		50'	2.1	
NGC 2232		06^{h} 26.4^{m}	−04° 45′	Monoceros	1,060	53	45'	3.9	
Trumpler 10		08^{h} 47.8^{m}	−42° 29′	Vela	1,100	35	14'	4.6	
IC 4665 (Summer Beehive Cluster)		17^{h} 46.3^{m}	+05° 43′	Ophiuchus	1,120	43	70'	4.2	
NGC 2547		08^{h} 10.8^{m}	−49° 18′	Vela	1,190	38	25'	4.7	
Collinder 140		07^{h} 24.5^{m}	−31° 51′	Canis Major	1,226	35	42'	3.5	
Sigma Orionis Cluster		05^{h} 38^{m}	−02° 36′	Orion	1,263				
IC 4756 (Graff's Cluster)		18^{h} 39.0^{m}	−05° 27′	Serpens	1,300	500	40'	4.6	
NGC 2516 (Southern Beehive Cluster)		07^{h} 58.0^{m}	−60° 48′	Carina	1,300	141	30'	3.8	
Lambda Orionis Cluster		05^{h} 35^{m}	+09° 56′	Orion	1,300	5		2.8	
NGC 3532 (Wishing Well Cluster)		11^{h} 06.4^{m}	−58° 40′	Carina	1,321	316	50'	3.0	
Trapezium Cluster		5^{h} 35.4^{m}	−05° 27′	Orion	1,344 ± 20	0.3	0.783'	4.0	
NGC 752		01^{h} 57.7^{m}	+37° 47′	Andromeda	1,470	1,700–2,000	75'	5.7	
Messier 34 (Spiral Cluster)		02^{h} 42.1^{m}	+42° 46′	Perseus	1,500	180	36'	5.2	
Messier 6 (Butterfly Cluster)		17^{h} 40.1^{m}	−32° 13′	Scorpius	1,590	94	20'	4.2	
Messier 47		07^{h} 36.6^{m}	−14° 30′	Puppis	1,600	73	25'	4.4	
NGC 6281 (Moth Wing Cluster)		17^{h} 04.7^{m}	−37° 59′	Scorpius	1,611	220	8'	5.4	
NGC 1980 (The Lost Jewel of Orion)		5^{h} 25.43^{m}	−05° 54′	Orion	1,793	4.7	14'	2.5	
Messier 25		18^{h} 31.7^{m}	−19° 07′	Sagittarius	2,000	92	30'	4.6	
Messier 23		17^{h} 57.0^{m}	−18° 59′	Sagittarius	2,050	300	30'	5.5	
NGC 5662		14^{h} 35.6^{m}	−56° 37′	Centaurus	2,170	70	30'	5.5	
NGC 225		00^{h} 43.6^{m}	+61° 46′	Cassiopeia	2,200	130	12'	7.0	
NGC 5460		14^{h} 07.4^{m}	−48° 20′	Centaurus	2,350	160	36'	5.6	
NGC 2264		06^{h} 41.0^{m}	+09° 53′	Monoceros	2,350 ± 52	1.5	40'	3.9	
Messier 41		06^{h} 46.0^{m}	−20° 46′	Canis Major	2,360	240	40'	4.5	
NGC 6025		16^{h} 03.3^{m}	−60° 26′	Triangulum Australe	2,410	130	14'	5.1	
Messier 48		08^{h} 13.7^{m}	−05° 45′	Hydra	2,500	400	30'	5.8	
IC 5146		21^{h} 53.5^{m}	+47° 16′	Cygnus	2,500±100	1	9'	7.2	
Messier 67 (King Cobra Cluster/Golden Eye Cluster)		08^{h} 51.3^{m}	+11° 48′	Cancer	2,610 – 2,930	4,000	25'	6.9	
NGC 2301		06^{h} 51.75^{m}	+00° 28′	Monoceros	2,840	165	12'	6.0	
Messier 50 (Heart-shaped Cluster)		07^{h} 02.6^{m}	−08° 23′	Monoceros	2,870	130	14'	5.9	
IC 4651		17^{h} 24.8^{m}	−49° 56′	Ara	2,900	1,900	10'	6.9	
NGC 7822 (Berkeley 59)		00^{h} 04.0^{m}	+68° 35′	Cepheus	2,900	2	180'		
Messier 35 (Shoe-Buckle Cluster)		06^{h} 09.1^{m}	+24° 21′	Gemini	2,970	180	25'	5.0	
NGC 3114		10^{h} 02.7^{m}	−60° 07′	Carina	2,970	124	36'	4.2	
NGC 381		01^{h} 08.3^{m}	+61° 35′	Cassiopeia	3,120 ± 300	320	7'	9.3	
Messier 93 (Critter Cluster)		07^{h} 44.6^{m}	−23° 52′	Puppis	3,380	390	10'	6.2	
NGC 1502 (Golden Harp Cluster)		04^{h} 07.8^{m}	+62° 20′	Camelopardalis	3,452	10	8'	5.7	
Messier 38 (Starfish Cluster)		05^{h} 28.7^{m}	+35° 51′	Auriga	3,480	316	20'	6.4	
NGC 6087 (S Normae Cluster)		16^{h} 18.8^{m}	−57° 56′	Norma	3,500	70	14'	5.4	
NGC 6204		16^{h} 46.1^{m}	−47° 01′	Ara	3,540	79	6'	8.2	
Collinder 121		07^{h} 08^{m}	−37° 10′	Canis Major	3,590 ± 0.72		50'	2.6	
NGC 2169		06^{h} 08.4^{m}	+13° 58′	Orion	3,600	12	5'	5.9	
NGC 2360 (Caroline's Cluster)		07^{h} 17.7^{m}	−15° 38′	Canis Major	3,700	1,000	13'	7.2	
Messier 21 (Webb's Cross)		18^{h} 04.2^{m}	−22° 29′	Sagittarius	3,930	12	14'	5.9	
Bochum 14		18^{h} 01^{m} 59.52^{s}	−23° 42′ 18.0″	Sagittarius	~4,000				
NGC 189		00^{h} 39.7^{m}	+61° 04′	Cassiopeia	4,200	510	3.7'	8.8	
Messier 18 (Black Swan Cluster)		18^{h} 20.0^{m}	−17° 06′	Sagittarius	4,230	17	5'	6.9	
Messier 36 (Pinwheel Cluster)		05^{h} 36.2^{m}	+34° 08′	Auriga	4,340 ± 0.87	25	10'	6.0	
NGC 6242		16^{h} 55.6^{m}	−39° 28′	Scorpius	4,350 ± 0.53	50	9'	6.4	
Messier 37 (Salt and Pepper Cluster)		05^{h} 52.3^{m}	+32° 33′	Auriga	4,500	347	14'	5.6	
Messier 52 (Scorpion Cluster)		23^{h} 24.8^{m}	+61° 35′	Cassiopeia	4,600	160	15'	6.9	
NGC 6067		16^{h} 13.2^{m}	−54° 13′	Norma	4,621	170	14'	5.6	
NGC 2362 (Tau Canis Majoris Cluster)		07^{h} 18.6^{m}	−24° 59′	Canis Major	4,830 ± 0.97	4–5	5'	4.1	
Messier 46		07^{h} 41.7^{m}	−14° 49′	Puppis	4,920 ± 980	250	20'	6.1	
Messier 26		18^{h} 45.3^{m}	−09° 23′	Scutum	5,160	85	7'	8.0	
NGC 2244 (Satellite Cluster)		06^{h} 31.9^{m}	+04° 56′	Monoceros	5,200	1.9	30'	4.8	
NGC 2355		07^{h} 17.0^{m}	+13° 47′	Gemini	5,380	955	5'	9.7	
NGC 188 (Polarissima Cluster)		00^{h} 48.4^{m}	+85° 15′	Cepheus	5,400	6,600	17'	8.1	
NGC 129		00^{h} 30.0^{m}	+60° 13′	Cassiopeia	5,450	76	21′	6.5	
NGC 3766 (Pearl Cluster)		11^{h} 36.2^{m}	−61° 37′	Centaurus	5,500	14	12'	5.3	
NGC 6231 (Baby Scorpion Cluster)		16^{h} 54.1^{m}	−41° 50′	Scorpius	5,600 ± 400	6	14'	2.6	
Messier 16 (Eagle Nebula)		18^{h} 18.8^{m}	−13° 49′	Serpens	5,700 ± 400	1.3	6'	6.0	
Messier 11 (Wild Duck Cluster)		18^{h} 51.1^{m}	−06° 16′	Scutum	6,120	250	13'	5.8	
NGC 2175		06^{h} 09.7^{m}	+20° 29′	Orion	6,350	8.9	5'	6.8	
NGC 6756		19^{h} 08.7^{m}	+04° 42′	Aquila	6,363	62	4'	4.5	
NGC 4755 (Jewel Box)		12^{h} 53.6^{m}	−60° 22′	Crux	6,500	14	10'	4.2	
NGC 6200		16^{h} 44.1^{m}	−47° 28′	Ara	6,700	8.5	12'	7.4	
NGC 6031		16^{h} 07.9^{m}	−54° 03′	Norma	6,800 ± 2.3	117	3'	8.5	
NGC 663		01^{h} 46.1^{m}	+61° 14′	Cassiopeia	6,850	25	14'	7.1	
NGC 637		01^{h} 43.0^{m}	+64° 02′	Cassiopeia	7,045 ± 1.409	10	4.2'	8.2	
NGC 2129		06^{h} 01.1^{m}	+23° 19′	Gemini	7,200	10	5'	6.7	
NGC 869 (h Persei)		02^{h} 19.1^{m}	+57° 09′	Perseus	7,460	12	18'	3.7	
NGC 1931		05^{h} 31.0^{m}	+34° 15′	Auriga	7,500	10	3'	10.1	
NGC 884 (χ Persei)		02^{h} 22.0^{m}	+57° 08′	Perseus	7,600	14	18'	3.8	
NGC 7789 (White Rose Cluster)		23^{h} 57.4^{m}	+56° 43′	Cassiopeia	7,600	1,700	16'	6.7	
NGC 457 (Dragonfly Cluster)		01^{h} 19.1^{m}	+58° 17′	Cassiopeia	7,922	21	20'	6.4	
Collinder 261		12^{h} 38.0^{m}	−68° 22′	Musca	8,150	8,000	9'	10.7	
NGC 659 (Yin-Yang Cluster)		01^{h} 44.4^{m}	+60° 40′	Cassiopeia	8,200	35	5'	7.9	
NGC 3293		10^{h} 35.8^{m}	−58° 13′	Carina	8,400	8	8'	4.7	
Trumpler 15		10^{h} 44^{m} 43^{s}	−59° 22.0′	Carina	8,600				
Trumpler 14		10^{h} 43^{m} 56^{s}	−59° 33′ 00″	Carina	8,980				
NGC 7419		22^{h} 54.3^{m}	+60° 48.9′	Cepheus	9,130		2'	13	
Trumpler 16		10^{h} 45^{m} 10^{s}	−59° 43′ 00″	Carina	9,270				
Messier 103		01^{h} 33.4^{m}	+60° 39′	Cassiopeia	9,400	16	5'	7.4	
NGC 2509		08^{h} 00.7^{m}	−19° 04′	Puppis	9,500	Uncertain	10'	9.3	
Messier 24 (Small Sagittarius Star Cloud)		18^{h} 17.0^{m}	−18° 29′	Sagittarius	10,000	220	90'	2.5	
NGC 6834		19^{h} 52.2^{m}	+29° 25′	Cygnus	10,850	76	5'	7.8	
NGC 2158		06^{h} 07.4^{m}	+24° 06′	Gemini	11,000	1,054	5'	8.6	
NGC 2439		07^{h} 40.8^{m}	−31° 41′	Puppis	12,570	25	9'	6.9	
NGC 6791		19^{h} 20.9^{m}	+37° 46′	Lyra	13,300	8,900	16'	9.5	
NGC 2204		06^{h} 15.5^{m}	−18° 40′	Canis Major	13,400 ± 1.3	787	13'	8.6	
Gaia 1		06^{h} 45.9^{m}	−16° 45′	Canis Major	15,000	6,300	13'	8.3	
Ruprecht 7		06^{h} 57^{m} 49.7^{s}	−13° 13′ 38″	Canis Major	16,300-18,780				
Teutsch 2		05^{h} 41.4^{m}	+39° 14′	Auriga	18,590	900	2'	11	
Alicante 7 (RSGC5)		18^{h} 44^{m} 29.45^{s}	−03° 30′ 02.4″	Scutum	19,600	16–20			
Alicante 10 (RSGC6)		18^{h} 45^{m} 30^{s}	−03° 40′ 00″	Scutum	19,600	16–20			
Arches Cluster		17^{h} 45^{m} 50.5^{s}	−28° 49′ 28″	Sagittarius	25,000	2.5			
Quintuplet Cluster		17^{h} 46^{m} 13.9^{s}	−28° 49′ 48″	Sagittarius	26,000	4.8			
Arp-Madore 2		07^{h} 38.8^{m}	−33° 51′	Puppis	30,000	5,000	1.3'		
Collinder 65		05^{h} 26^{m} 6.00^{s}	+16° 41′ 60.0″	Taurus					
Collinder 173		08^{h} 02^{m} 49.00^{s}	−46° 23′ 0.0″	Vela					
Collinder 463		01^{h} 48^{m} 35.60^{s}	+71° 44′ 28.0″	Cassiopeia					
Brocchi's Cluster		19^{h} 25^{m} 24.00^{s}	+20° 11′ 0.0″	Vulpecula					

=== Local Group ===
Open clusters of the Local Group
Identifier	Image	Epoch J2000		Diameter (′)	Apparent Magnitude	Galaxy
Identifier	Image	Right ascension	Declination	Diameter (′)	Apparent Magnitude	Galaxy
NGC 2070		05^{h} 38.7^{m}	−69° 06′	3.5'	7.25	LMC
Hodge 301		05^{h} 38.5^{m}	−69° 04′	0.5'	11	LMC
NGC 376		01^{h} 03^{m} 50.21^{s}	−72° 49′ 33.5″		10.90	SMC

== See also ==
- Lists of astronomical objects
- List of globular clusters
- List of infrared clusters
- Lists of clusters
