= NGC 643 =

Star cluster in the constrellation Hydrus

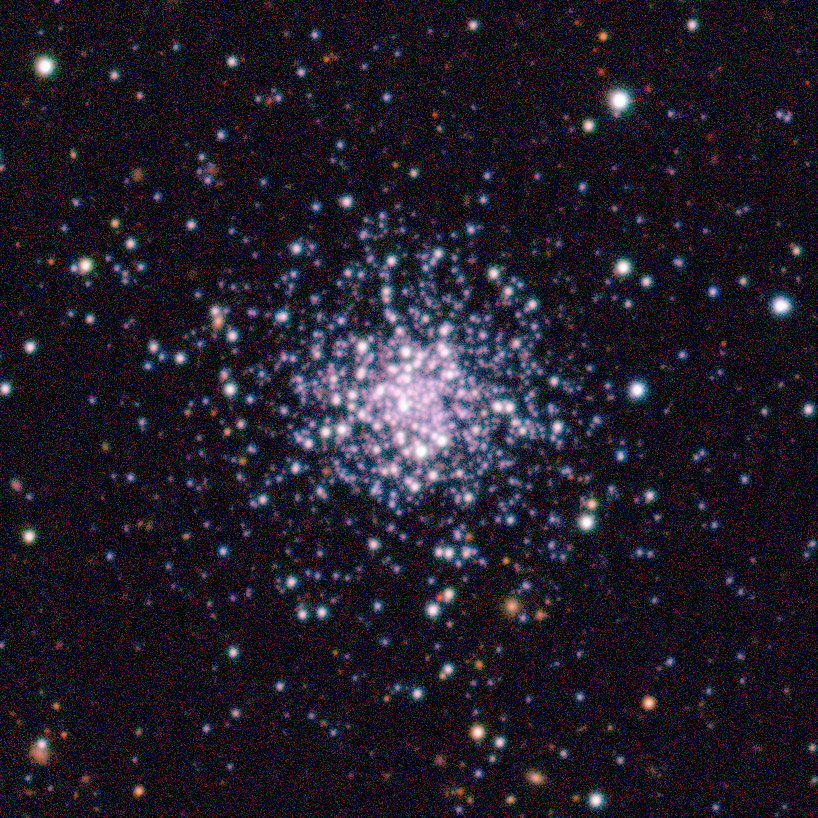
- NGC 643 with DECam

Observation data (J2000 epoch)
- Right ascension: 01^{h} 35^{m} 01.43^{s}
- Declination: −75° 33′ 24.7″
- Distance: ~200,000 ly
- Apparent magnitude (V): 13
- Apparent dimensions (V): 1.50 arcmin

Physical characteristics
- Other designations: ESO 29-SC50

Associations
- Constellation: Hydrus

NGC 643 is an open cluster located on the far outskirts of the Small Magellanic Cloud in the southern constellation of Hydrus, approximately 200,000 light-years from Earth. Due to their close proximity to NGC 643, the open cluster ESO 29-SC44 and the galaxies PGC 6117 and PGC 6256 are also designated NGC 643A, NGC 643B and NGC 643C, respectively. NGC 643 is relatively old. Its brightest stars have an apparent magnitude of 19.

== Observation history ==
NGC 643 was discovered by the British astronomer John Herschel on 18 September 1835. John Louis Emil Dreyer, compiler of the first New General Catalogue of Nebulae and Clusters of Stars, described NGC 643 as being "very faint, pretty small, round" and as becoming "very gradually a little brighter [in the] middle".

== See also ==
- List of open clusters
