= NGC 2129 =

Open cluster in the constellation Gemini

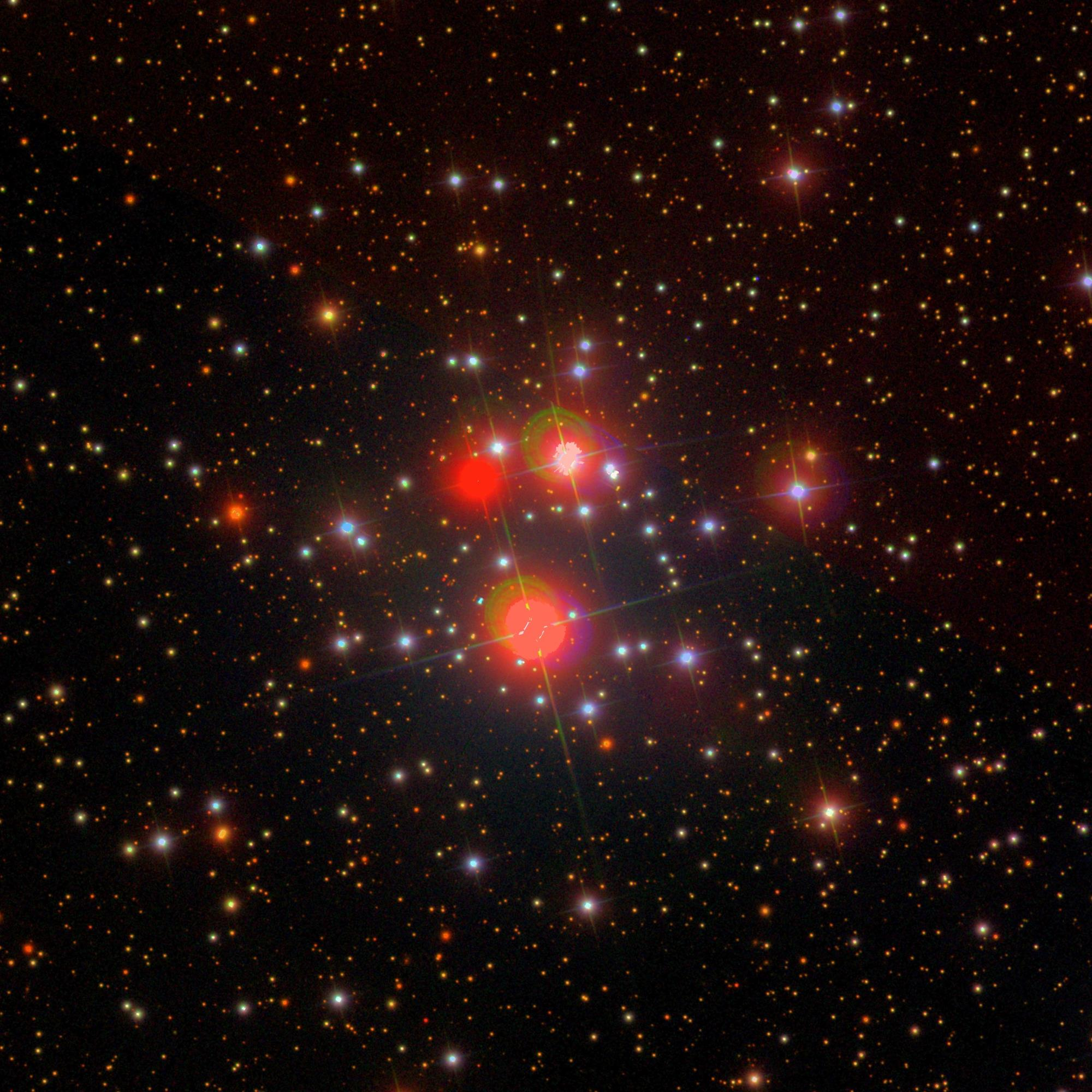
- SDSS image of NGC 2129

Observation data (J2000 epoch)
- Right ascension: 06^{h} 01^{m} 06.5^{s}
- Declination: +23° 10′ 20″
- Distance: 7,200 ly (2,200 pc)
- Apparent magnitude (V): 6.7
- Absolute magnitude (V): -5.01
- Apparent dimensions (V): 5′

Physical characteristics
- Radius: 5.2
- Estimated age: 10 Myr
- Other designations: NGC 2129, C 0558+233, OCl 467, OCISM 10, KPR2004b 84.

Associations
- Constellation: Gemini

NGC 2129 is an open cluster of stars in the constellation of Gemini. It has an angular diameter of 2.5 arcminutes and is approximately 2.2 ± 0.2 kpc (~7,200 light years) from the Sun inside the Local spiral arm. At that distance, the angular size of the cluster corresponds to a diameter of about 10.4 light years. NGC 2129 is a very young cluster whose age has been estimated at 10 million years. It was discovered by William Herschel on November 16, 1784.

The group is dominated by two close B-Type stars, HD 250289 (B2III) and HD 250290 (B3I). With the two stars sharing the same proper motion and radial velocity it is likely that the two constitute a binary system.

On 21 December 2010 it was occulted by the Moon during a Total Lunar Eclipse (the December 2010 lunar eclipse) over Japan, the North Pacific and North America. This will happen again during the December 2029 lunar eclipse over South America, the Atlantic Ocean and Africa, and again on 21 December 2094 over New Guinea, Northern Australia and the Pacific Ocean.

== See also ==
- List of Messier objects
- List of NGC objects
- List of open clusters
- General Catalogue of Nebulae and Clusters
