= Messier 67 =

Old open cluster in the constellation Cancer

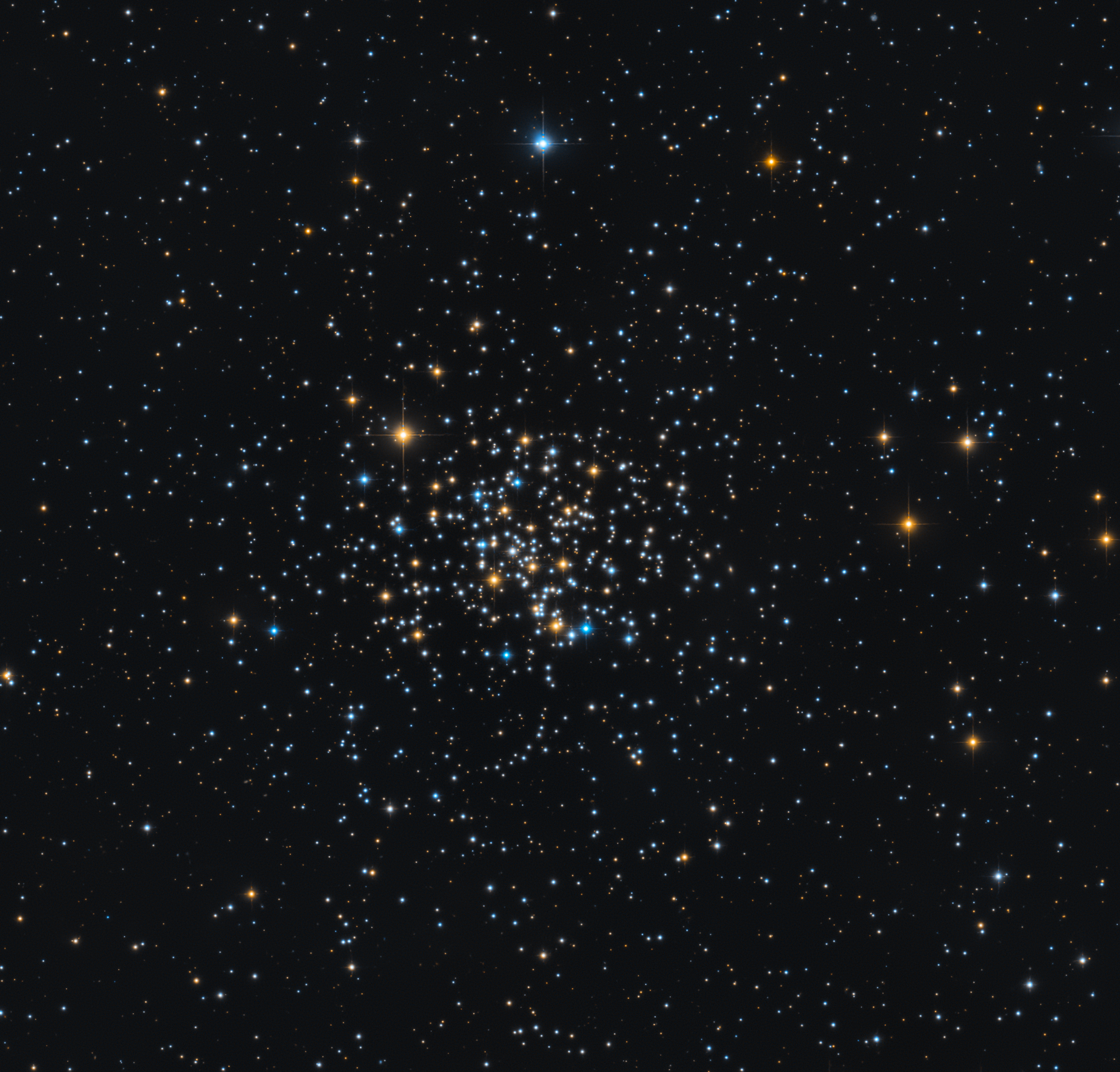
- Open cluster Messier 67 in Cancer

Observation data (J2000.0 epoch)
- Right ascension: 08^{h} 51.3^{m}
- Declination: +11° 49′
- Distance: ~2.61–2.93 kly (800–900 pc)
- Apparent magnitude (V): 6.1
- Apparent dimensions (V): 30.0′

Physical characteristics
- Radius: 10 ly
- Estimated age: 3.2 to 5 billion years
- Other designations: NGC 2682, Cr 204

Associations
- Constellation: Cancer

Messier 67 (also known as M67 or NGC 2682) and sometimes called the King Cobra Cluster or the Golden Eye Cluster is an open cluster in the southern, equatorial half of Cancer. It was discovered by Johann Gottfried Koehler in 1779. Estimates of its age range between 3.2 and 5 billion years. Distance estimates are likewise varied, but typically are 800–900 parsecs (2,600–2,900 ly). Estimates of 855, 840, and 815 pc were established via binary star modelling and infrared color-magnitude diagram fitting.

== Description ==
M67 is not the oldest known open cluster; several Milky Way clusters are known to be older, yet farther than M67. It is a paradigm study object in stellar evolution:

- it is well-populated
- has negligible amounts of dust obscuration
- all its stars are at the same distance and age, save for approximately 30 anomalous blue stragglers

M67 is one of the most-studied open clusters, yet estimates of its physical parameters such as age, mass, and number of stars of a given type, vary substantially. Richer et al. estimate its age to be 4 billion years, its mass to be 1080 solar masses (M_{☉}), and number its white dwarfs at 150. Hurley et al. estimate its current mass to be 1,400 M_{☉} and its initial mass to be approximately 10 times as great.

It has more than 100 stars similar to the Sun, and numerous red giants. The total star count has been estimated at well over 500. The ages and prevalence of Sun-like stars had led some astronomers to theorize it as the possible parent cluster of the Sun. However, computer simulations disagree on whether the outer Solar System would have survived an ejection from M67, and the cluster itself would probably not have survived such an ejection event.

The cluster contains no main sequence stars bluer (hotter) than spectral type F, other than perhaps some of the blue stragglers, since the brighter stars of that age have already left the main sequence. In fact, when the stars of the cluster are plotted on the Hertzsprung-Russell diagram, there is a distinct "turn-off" representing the stars which have terminated hydrogen fusion in the core and are destined to become red giants. As a cluster ages, the turn-off moves progressively down the main sequence to cooler stars.

It appears that M67 has a bias toward heavier stars. One cause of this is mass segregation, the process by which lighter stars gain speed at the expense of more massive stars during close encounters, which moves them to greater average distance from the center of the cluster or allows escape altogether.

A March 2016 joint AIP/JHU study by Barnes et al. on rotational periods of 20 Sun-like stars, measured by the effects of moving starspots on light curves, suggests that these approximately 4 billion-year old stars spin in about 26 days – like the Sun, which has a period at the equator of 25.38 days. Measurements were carried out as part of the extended K2 mission of Kepler space telescope. This reinforces the applicability of many key properties of the Sun to stars of the same size and age, a fundamental principle of modern solar and stellar physics. The authors abbreviate this as the "solar-stellar connection".

== Exoplanets ==
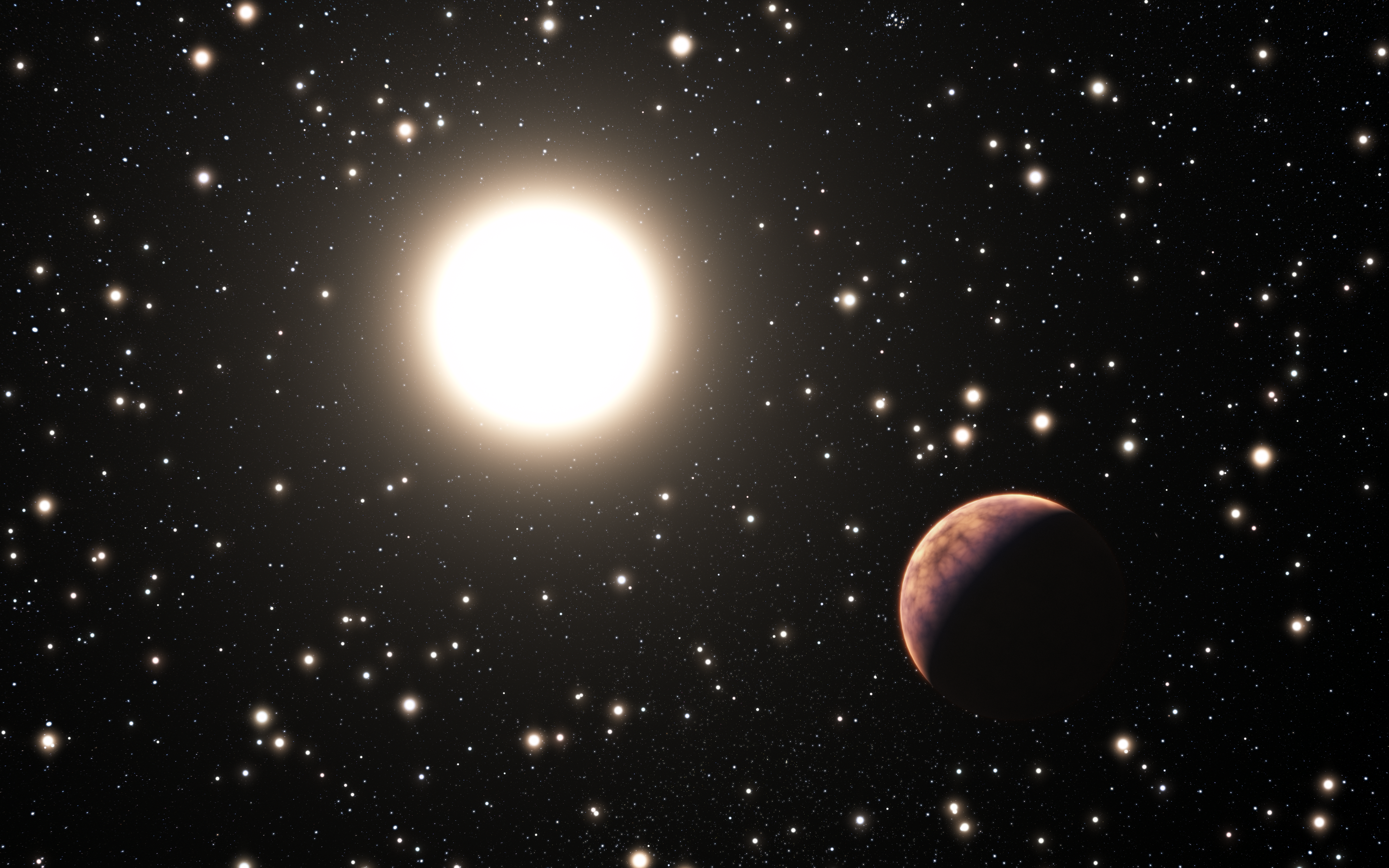
Artistic impression of an exoplanet orbiting a star in Messier 67.

A radial velocity survey of M67 has found exoplanets around five stars in the cluster: YBP 1194, YBP 1514, YBP 401, Sand 978, and Sand 1429. A sixth star, Sand 364, was also thought to have a planet, but a follow-up study did not find evidence for it and concluded that the radial velocity variations have a non-planetary origin, likely stellar variability.

== Gallery ==
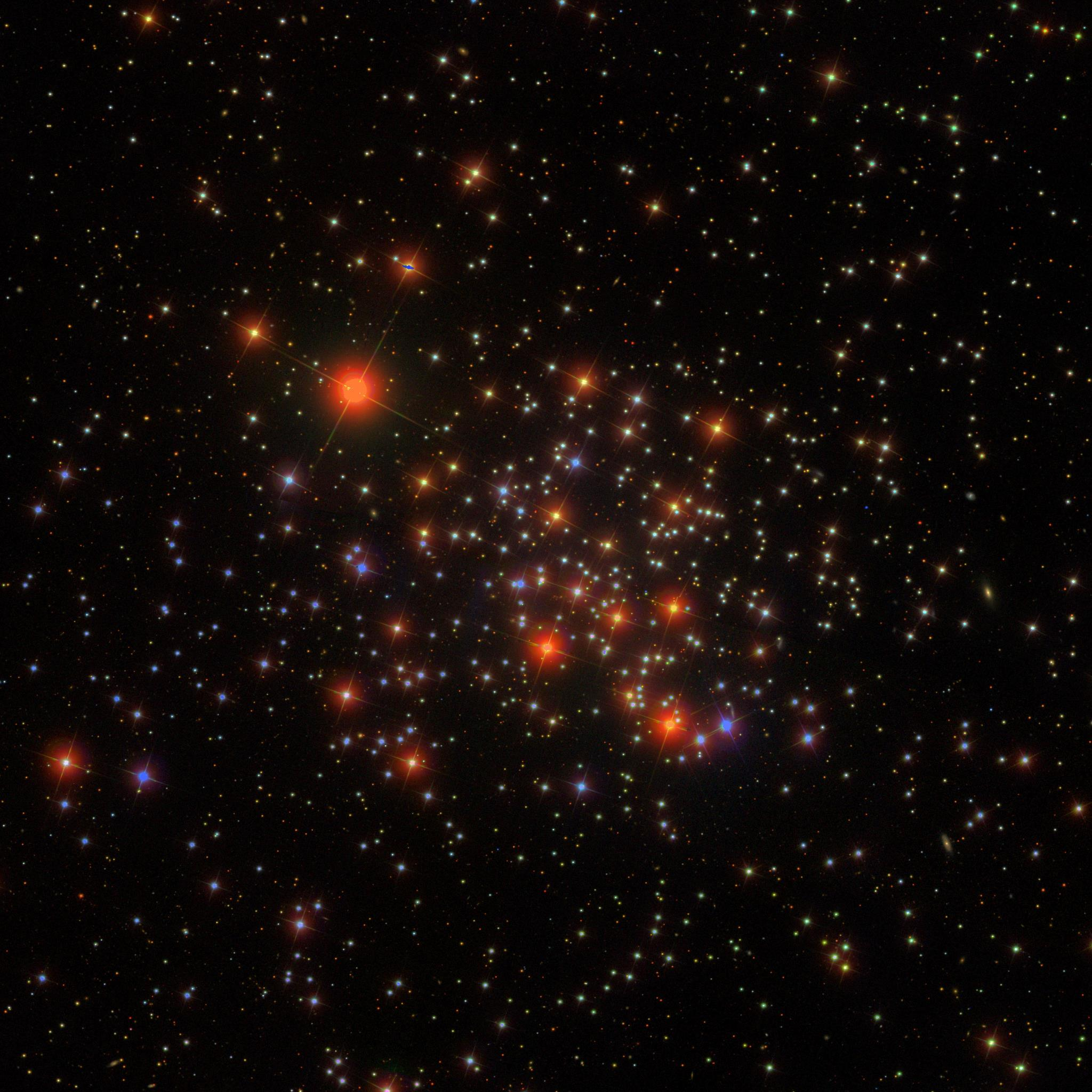
Messier 67 (SDSS, optical and near-infrared)

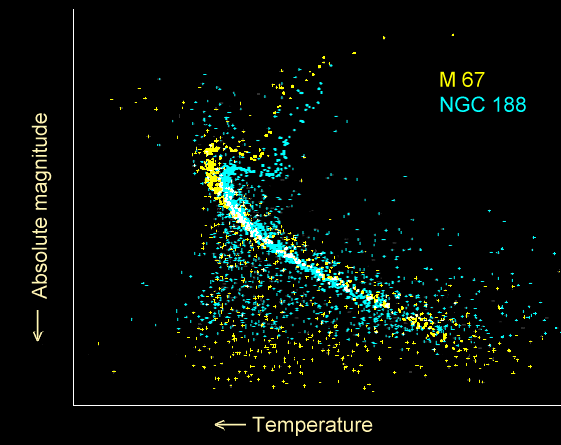
Hertzsprung-Russell diagram for two open clusters, M67 and NGC 188, showing color-magnitude data

Artist's impression video showing a hot Jupiter exoplanet orbiting close to a star in Messier 67

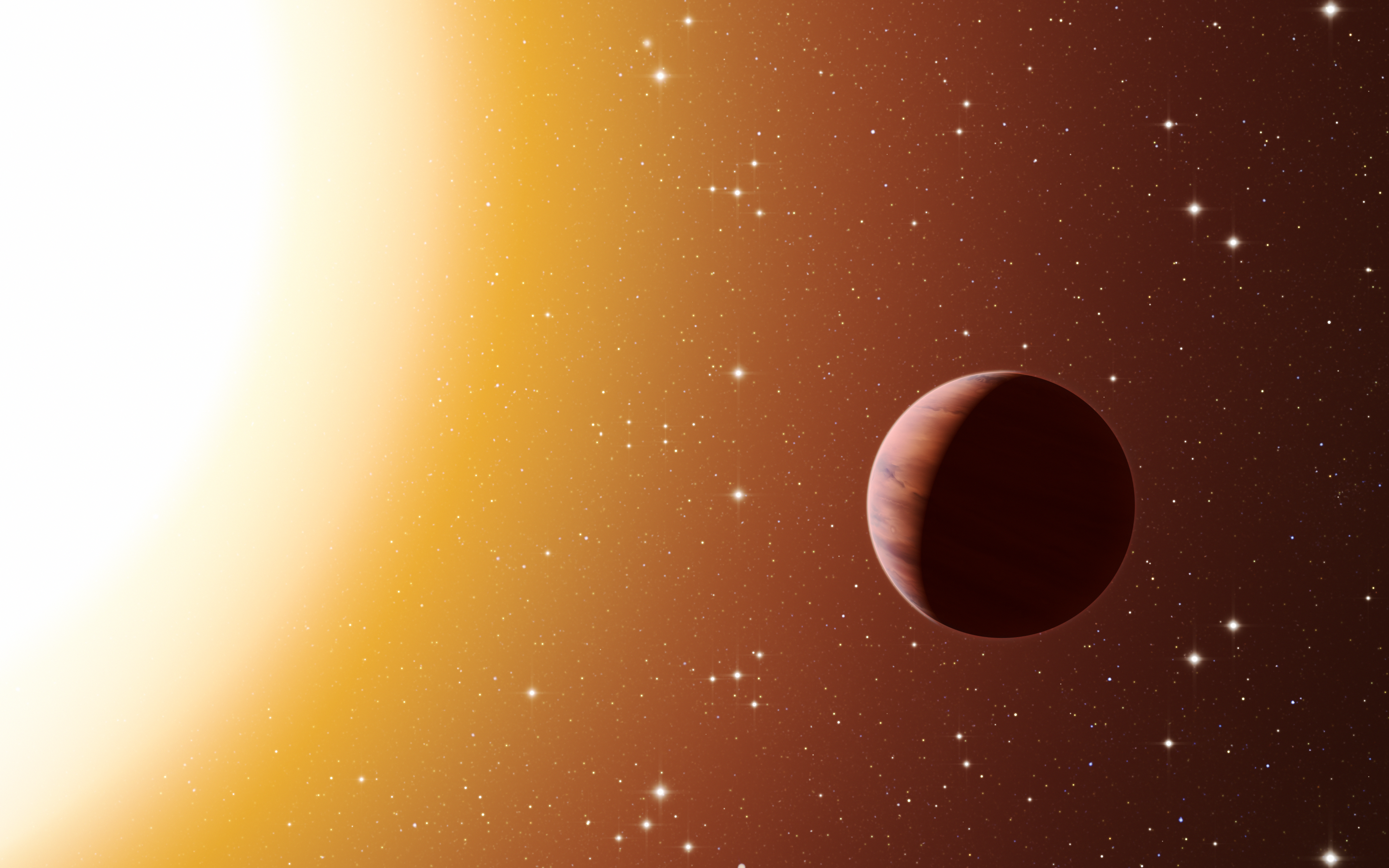
Artist's impression of a hot Jupiter exoplanet in the star cluster Messier 67

== See also ==
- List of Messier objects
- List of open clusters
- Open cluster family
- Open cluster remnant
