= Butterfly Cluster =

Open cluster in Scorpius

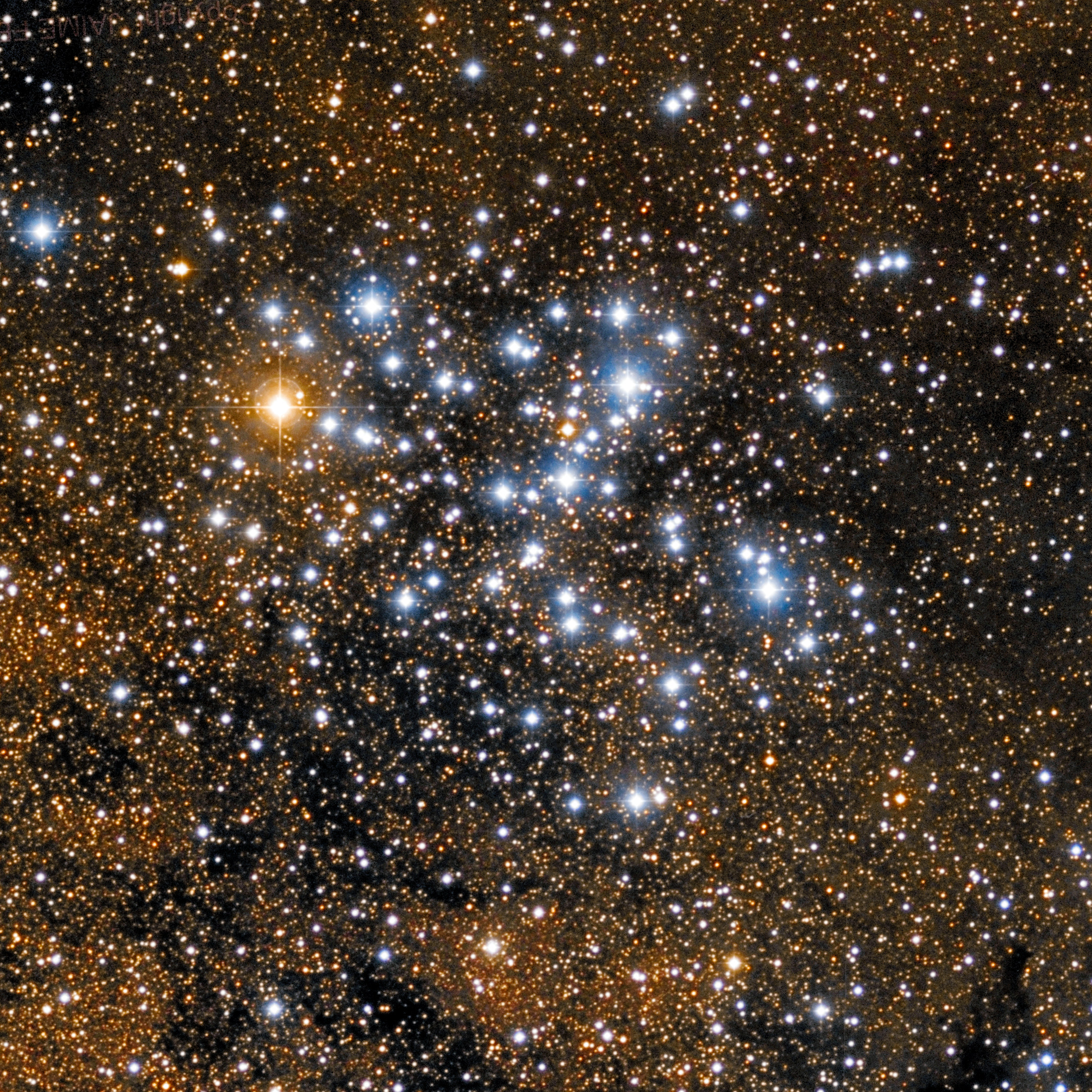

Observation data (J2000.0 epoch)
- Right ascension: 17^{h} 40.1^{m}
- Declination: −32° 13′
- Distance: 1.59 kly (0.487 kpc)
- Apparent magnitude (V): 4.2
- Apparent dimensions (V): 25′

Physical characteristics
- Radius: 6 light-years
- Estimated age: 94.2 Myr
- Other designations: Messier 6, NGC 6405, Cr 341, Mel 178, Lund 769, OCL 1030, ESO 455-SC030

Associations
- Constellation: Scorpius

The Butterfly Cluster (cataloged as Messier 6 or M6, and as NGC 6405) is an open cluster of stars in the southern constellation of Scorpius. Its name derives from the resemblance of its shape to a butterfly.

The first astronomer to record the Butterfly Cluster's existence was Giovanni Battista Hodierna in 1654. However, Robert Burnham Jr. has proposed that the 2nd century astronomer Ptolemy may have seen it with the naked eye while observing its neighbor the Ptolemy Cluster (M7). Credit for the discovery is usually given to Jean-Philippe Loys de Chéseaux in 1746. Charles Messier observed the cluster on May 23, 1764, and added it to his Messier Catalog.

Estimates of the Butterfly Cluster's distance have varied over the years. Wu et al. (2009) found a distance estimate of 1,590 light-years, giving it a spatial dimension of some 12 light years. Modern measurements show its total visual brightness to be magnitude 4.2. The cluster is estimated to be 94.2 million years old. Cluster members show a slightly higher abundance of elements heavier than helium compared to the Sun; what astronomers refer to as the metallicity.

120 stars, ranging down to visual magnitude 15.1, have been identified as most likely cluster members. Most of the bright stars in this cluster are hot, blue B-type stars but the brightest member is a K-type orange giant star, BM Scorpii, which contrasts sharply with its blue neighbours in photographs. BM Scorpii, is classed as a semiregular variable star, its brightness varying from magnitude +5.5 to magnitude +7.0. There are also eight candidate chemically peculiar stars.

The cluster is located 24.59 ± 0.13 kly (7.54 ± 0.04 kpc) from the Galactic Center and is following an orbit through the Milky Way galaxy with a low eccentricity of 0.03 and an orbital period of 204.2 Myr. At present it is 23 ly (7 pc) below the galactic plane, and it will cross the plane every 29.4 Myr.

== See also ==
- List of open clusters
- List of Messier objects
- Nu Andromedae, a candidate escaped star system from this cluster
