= Sand 364 =

Red giant star in the cluster M67

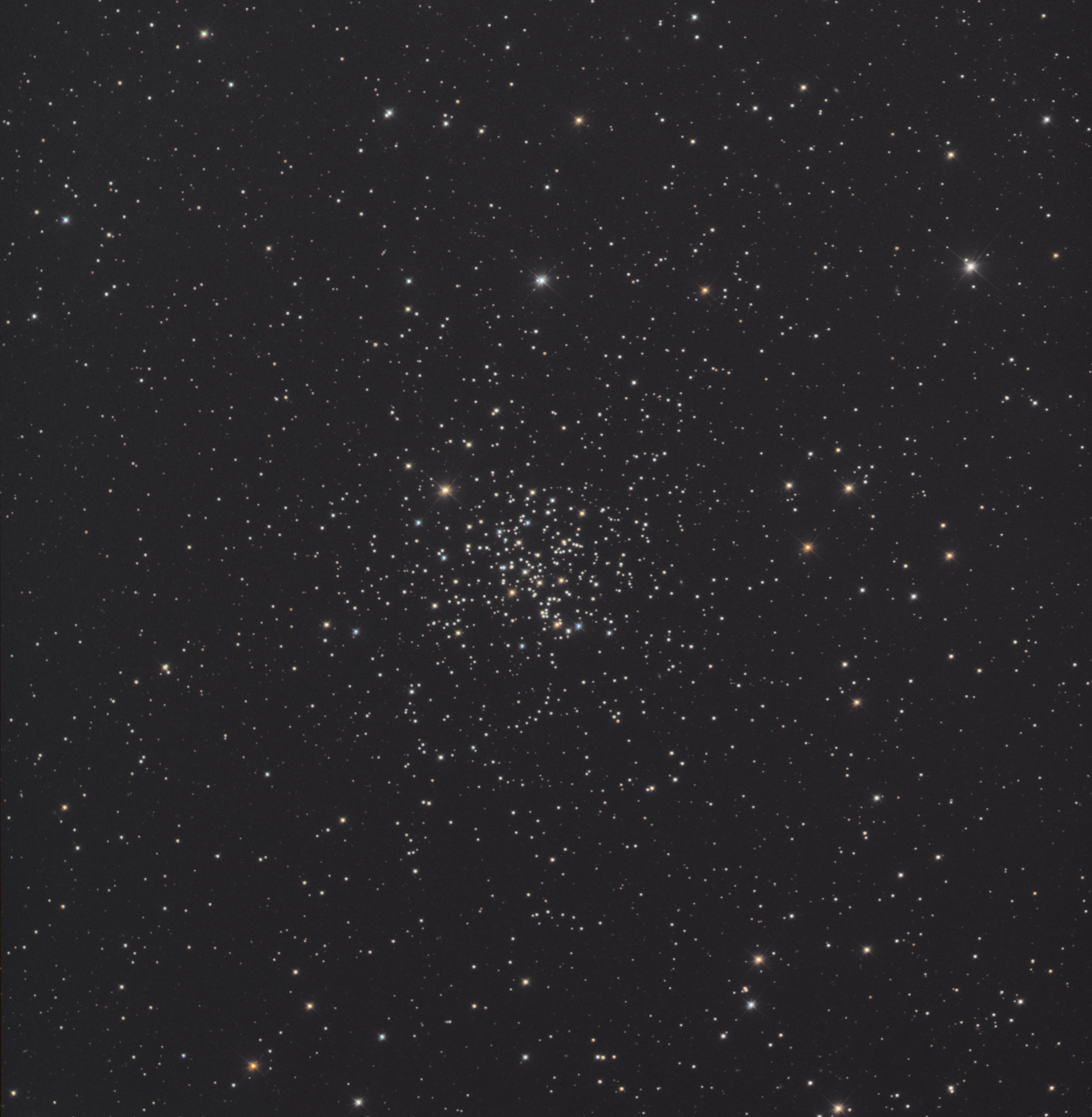
- Sand 364 in Messier 67, circled in red

Observation data Epoch J2000 Equinox ICRS
- Constellation: Cancer
- Right ascension: 08^{h} 49^{m} 56.818^{s}
- Declination: +11° 41′ 32.99″
- Apparent magnitude (V): 9.8

Characteristics
- Evolutionary stage: red giant branch
- Spectral type: K3III
- U−B color index: 4.06
- B−V color index: 1.36
- Variable type: SR/L

Astrometry
Radial velocity (R_{v})	33.32±0.13 km/s
Proper motion (μ)	RA: -10.756 mas/yr Dec.: -2.811 mas/yr
Parallax (π)	1.1905±0.0177 mas
Distance	2,740 ± 40 ly (840 ± 10 pc)
Absolute magnitude (M_{V})	+0.18

Details
Mass	1.35±0.05 M_{☉}
Radius	18.8 R_{☉}
Luminosity	152.7 L_{☉}
Surface gravity (log g)	2.20±0.06 cgs
Temperature	4284±9 K
Metallicity [Fe/H]	−0.02±0.04 dex
Rotational velocity (v sin i)	4.2±0.5 km/s
Age	4.15±0.65 Gyr

Other designations
- BD+12 1917, EPIC 211403356, TYC 813-2344-1, NGC 2682 SAND 364

Database references
SIMBAD	data
Exoplanet Archive	data

Sand 364 is a K-type giant star on the red-giant branch within the cluster Messier 67 (also called NGC 2682), which is located in the constellation Cancer. With an apparent magnitude of 9.8, it is too faint to be seen with the naked eye, but is visible through binoculars or a small telescope under clear, dark skies. It is located at a distance of about 2,740 light-years (840 parsecs) from the Sun based on parallax, and has an absolute magnitude of +0.18.

== Nomenclature ==
The designation Sand 364 (also written Sanders 364 or NGC 2682 Sand 364) comes from a catalog of stars in M67 compiled by W. L. Sanders in 1977. Other designations include BD+12 1917, from the Bonner Durchmusterung catalog.

== Physical characteristics and evolution ==
Sand 364 is an aging red giant star with about 1.35 solar masses, initially thought to be more massive. Its radius is 39.59 times bigger than the Sun's, and its expanded outer layers give it a vast surface area, causing its bolometric luminosity to be around 150 times the Sun's. It has a surface temperature of about 4,284 K, meaning it is cooler than the Sun and has a spectral type of K3III. It is thought to be around 4.1 billion years old, and most likely evolved from an early F-type main sequence star, or a late A-type main sequence star.

The star’s atmosphere is cooler than that of the Sun, leading to strong molecular absorption bands in its spectrum, a characteristic of evolved giant stars. Sand 364’s internal structure has changed dramatically from its main sequence phase. Hydrogen fusion now occurs in a shell surrounding an inert helium core, causing the star to swell and cool in its outer envelope. This stage is relatively brief in stellar terms but crucial for understanding the life cycle of stars with masses similar to the Sun.

After its time on the red giant branch, it will shrink into a red clump star on the horizontal branch, possibly after a helium flash; under unlikely circumstances, it could smoothly ignite helium and become a blue loop star. After that, it will certainly enter the asymptotic giant branch, and most likely end up as a carbon/oxygen white dwarf.

== Search for exoplanets ==
=== Discovery of Sand 364b ===
A radial velocity survey of M67 in 2014 suggested that Sand 364 had a planet, with a mass of about 1–6 Jupiters, and a radius of about 0.9 Jupiters. Due to recent discoveries, this is now likely false.

=== False planet ===
A newer analysis revealed that the previously reported planet orbiting Sanders 364 was likely a false positive. While the original detection by Brucalassi et al. identified a 121-day periodic signal in the star's radial velocity data—consistent with a giant planet—further independent studies failed to confirm its planetary origin.

Instead, more extensive datasets revealed that Sanders 364 exhibits multiple long-period, quasiperiodic radial velocity variations, not just the 121-day signal. These signals, though initially suggestive of orbital motion, lack the coherence and dynamical consistency expected from a true planetary companion. Crucially, none of the six detected signals show the stability or amplitude pattern characteristic of a planetary-induced Doppler shift over the long term.
