= NGC 5662 =

Open cluster in the constellation Centaurus

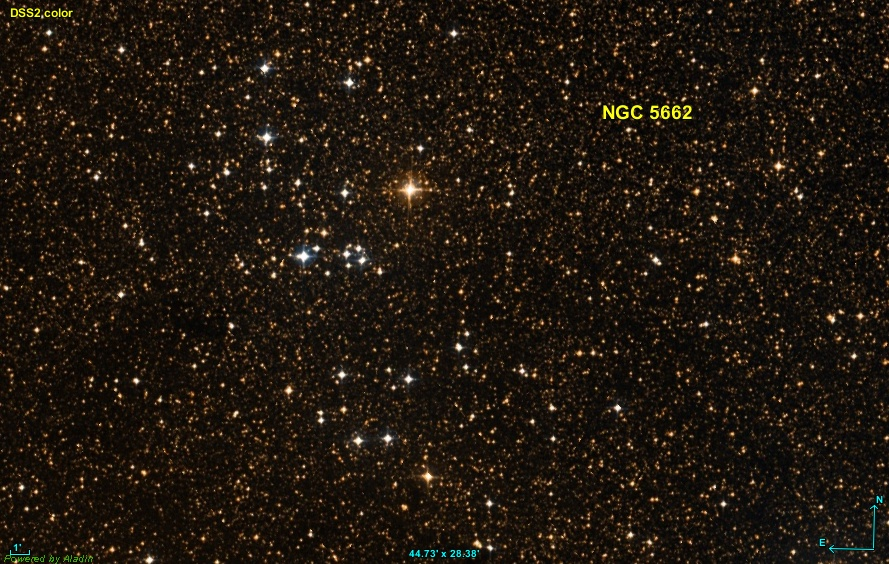
- NGC 5662 imaged by DSS

Observation data (J2000 epoch)
- Right ascension: 14^{h} 35^{m} 37^{s}
- Declination: −56° 37′ 06″
- Distance: 2,170 ly (666 pc)
- Apparent magnitude (V): 5.5
- Apparent dimensions (V): 12'

Physical characteristics
- Mass: 348 M_{☉}
- Estimated age: 93 million years
- Other designations: Melotte 127, Colinder 284, vdBH 162

Associations
- Constellation: Centaurus

NGC 5662, also known as the Gypsy Moth Cluster, is an open cluster in the constellation Centaurus. It was discovered by Nicolas Louis de Lacaille on May 17, 1752 from South Africa. James Dunlop observed it on July 10, 1826 from Parramatta, Australia and added it to his catalog as No. 342.

It is a rich cluster (Trumpler class II3r), with 295 stars according to Haug (1978) and 280 according with Archinal, Hynes (2003). One of its members, V Centauri, is a cepheid variable. Despite its large distance from the cluster centre, it has high likelihood of being a member of it. The tidal radius of the cluster is 6.4 - 12.4 parsecs (21 - 40 light years) and represents the average outer limit of NGC 5662, beyond which a star is unlikely to remain gravitationally bound to the cluster core.
