= S Normae =

Star in the constellation Norma

- Location of S Normae (circled)

Observation data Epoch J2000 Equinox ICRS
- Constellation: Norma
- Right ascension: 16^{h} 18^{m} 51.8325^{s}
- Declination: −57° 53′ 59.244″
- Apparent magnitude (V): 6.394 (6.12 - 6.77)

Characteristics
- Spectral type: F8-G0Ib + B9.5V
- U−B color index: +0.66
- B−V color index: +1.00
- Variable type: δ Cepheid

Astrometry
Radial velocity (R_{v})	5.83 km/s
Proper motion (μ)	RA: 0.07 mas/yr Dec.: 0.04 mas/yr
Parallax (π)	1.16±0.76 mas
Distance	924 pc
Absolute magnitude (M_{V})	-4.02

Orbit
Period (P)	8,660 yr
Semi-major axis (a)	794 AU

Details
Mass	6.3 M_{☉}
Radius	65.6 R_{☉}
Luminosity	3,630 L_{☉}
Temperature	6,350 K
Metallicity	+0.10

companion
Mass	2.4 M_{☉}
Age	80 Myr

Other designations
- S Nor, HR 6062, SAO 243586, CD−57°6342, GSC 08719-00158, HD 146323, NGC 6087 132, GC 21898, HIP 79932, NGC 6087 155

Database references
SIMBAD	data

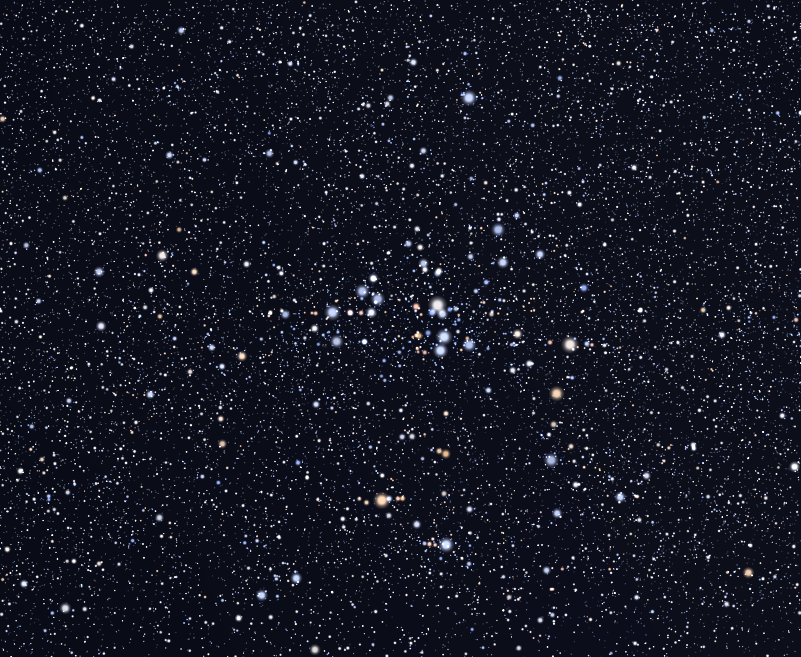
S Normae is the brightest member of the open cluster NGC 6087.

S Normae (S Nor) is a yellow supergiant variable star in the constellation Norma. It is the brightest member of the open cluster NGC 6087.

S Normae is a Classical Cepheid variable with a visual magnitude range of 6.12 to 6.77 and a period of 9.75411 days. The spectral type varies during the pulsation cycle from F8 to G0. Its mass has been measured at 6.3 M_{☉} with reference to a close orbital companion, and it is over 3,000 times as luminous as the sun.

== Companions ==
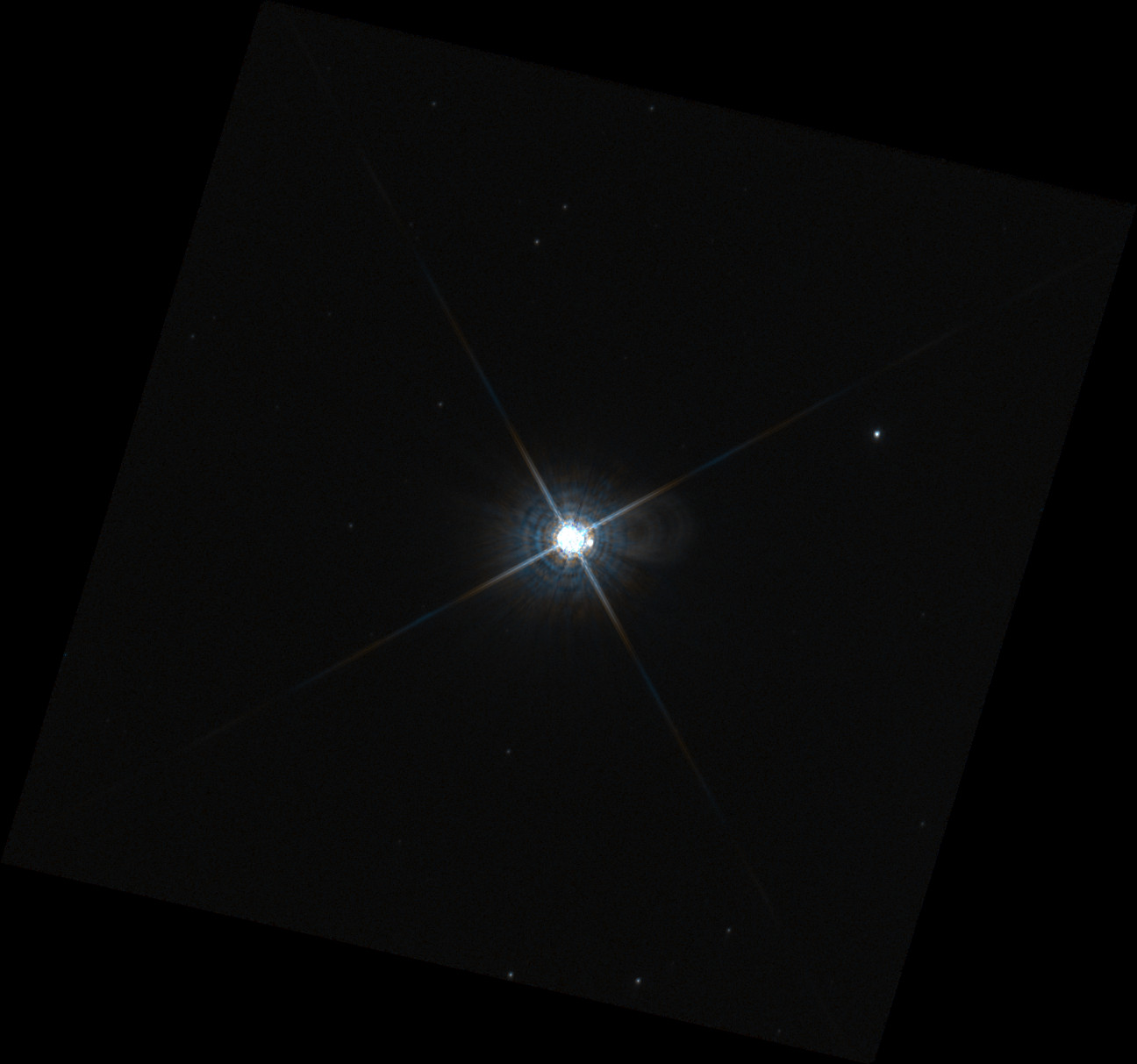
S Normae system, showing the "spectroscopic" companion and the three faint nearby companions, but not TYC 8719-794-1

S Normae is a spectroscopic binary, although the companion has now been resolved using the Hubble Space Telescope Wide Field Camera 3. The separation was 0.90" in April 2011, corresponding to 817 AU. This gives the rare opportunity for a direct determination of the mass of a Cepheid variable star and confirmation of other properties. It is a supergiant that is 6.3 times as massive as the Sun and 2,800 times as luminous. The companion a 2.4 M_{☉} blue-white main sequence star of spectral type B9.5.

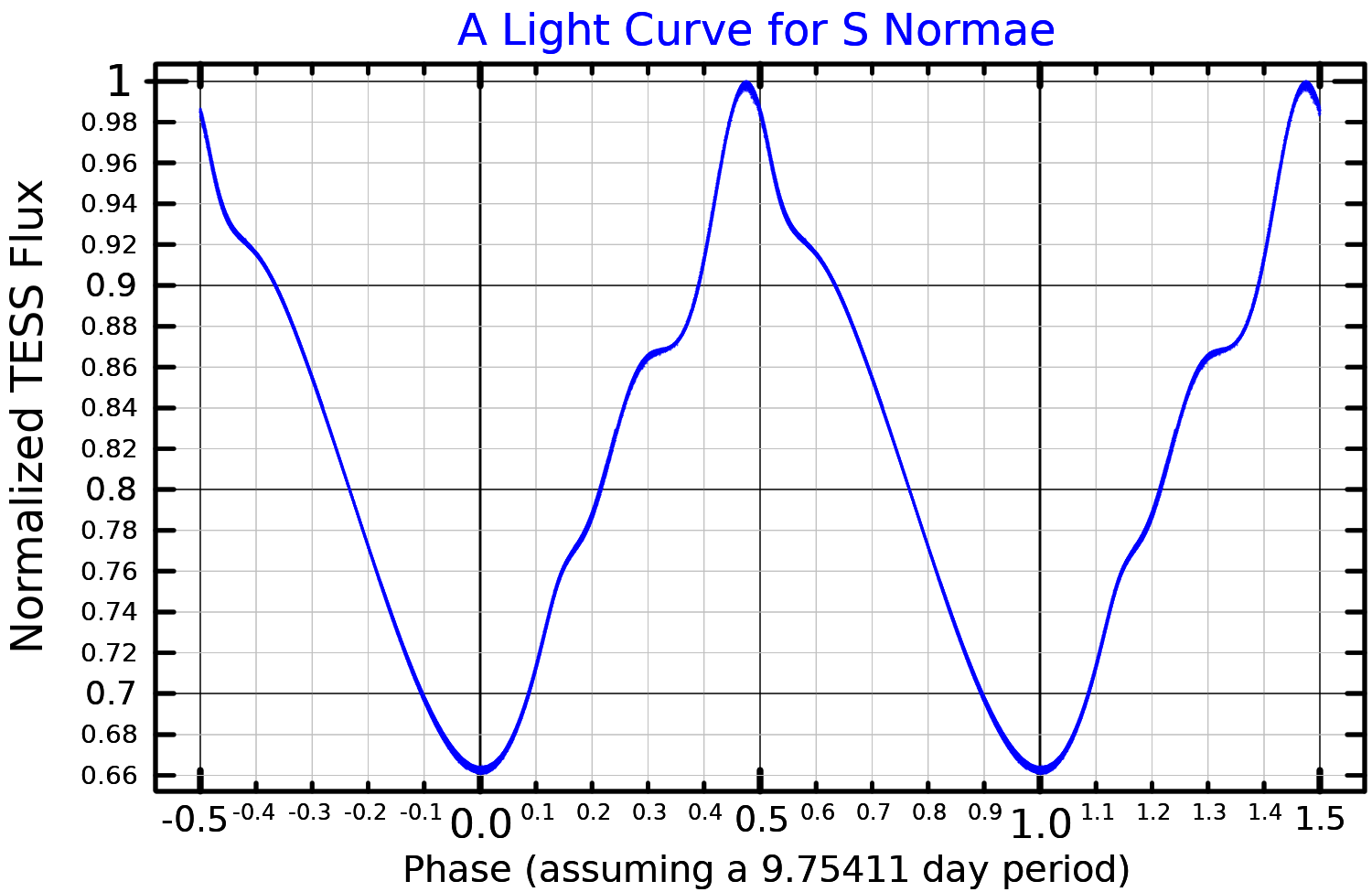
A light curve for S Normae, plotted from TESS data

There is a more distant 10th magnitude companion at 30", unsurprising in the centre of an open cluster. It is TYC 8719-794-1, a chemically peculiar A or B class star. Three fainter companions have also been found: a 14th magnitude star at 14"; and two 16th magnitude stars at 20".
