= BM Scorpii =

Variable star in the constellation Scorpius

- Location of BM Scorpii (circled)

Observation data Epoch J2000 Equinox J2000
- Constellation: Scorpius
- Right ascension: 17^{h} 40^{m} 58.54640^{s}
- Declination: −32° 12′ 52.0644″
- Apparent magnitude (V): 5.25 – 6.46

Characteristics
- Spectral type: K2Ib H_{δ}1
- Variable type: SRd

Astrometry
Radial velocity (R_{v})	−7.39 km/s
Proper motion (μ)	RA: −0.895 mas/yr Dec.: −6.073 mas/yr
Parallax (π)	2.0344±0.0681 mas
Distance	1,600 ± 50 ly (490 ± 20 pc)
Absolute magnitude (M_{V})	−2.57

Details
Mass	5-9 M_{☉}
Radius	129 R_{☉}
Luminosity	3,388 L_{☉}
Surface gravity (log g)	1.1 cgs
Temperature	3,888 K
Metallicity [Fe/H]	−0.22 dex

Other designations
- BM Sco, CD−32°13142, HD 160371, HIP 86527

Database references
SIMBAD	data

BM Scorpii (BM Sco) is a red supergiant and a semiregular variable star located in the constellation Scorpius. It lies approximately 490 parsecs (1,600 ly) away in the open cluster Messier 6, the Butterfly Cluster. Although its brightness varies, it is at least occasionally visible to the naked eye of an observer with dark skies far from city lights.

== Characteristics ==
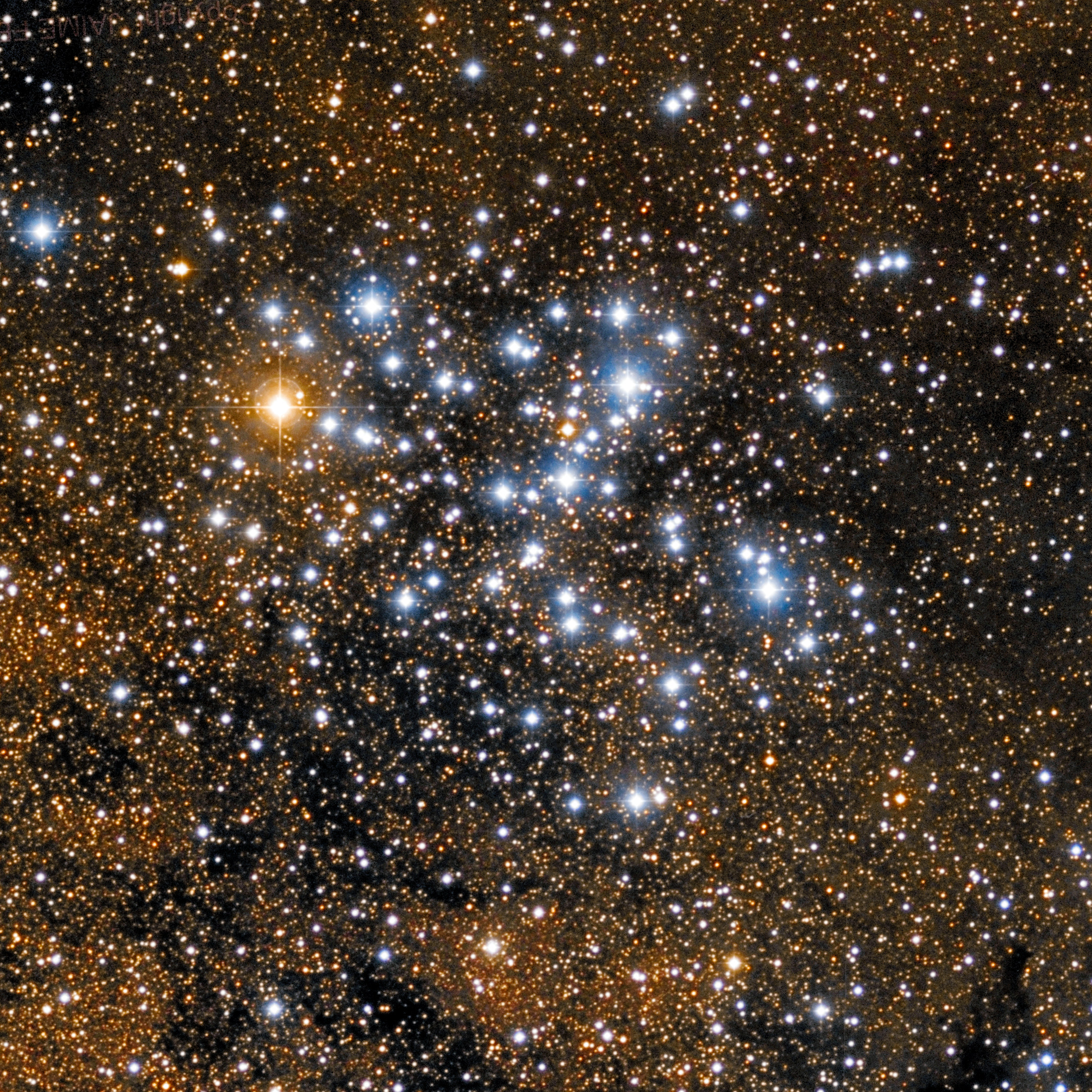
The Butterfly Cluster Messier 6 with BM Scorpii prominent as the lone red supergiant

BM Scorpii is a red supergiant of spectral type K2Ib. While it is listed as a standard star for that spectral class, it is also considered to have somewhat stronger H_{δ} absorption lines than normal. Its luminosity and mass are considered to be borderline for a supergiant star, and its spectral class has been given as K3III, which would indicate a giant star.

BM Scorpii is a confirmed member of the open cluster Messier 6 (M6) and the brightest star in the cluster. The brightest other stars in the cluster are late B- and A-class main sequence stars. A search has been made for other cool supergiant members, but none were found.

With an effective temperature of 3,900 K and a radius of 129 R_{☉}, BM Scorpii has a bolometric luminosity of 3,388 L_{☉}. Its angular diameter has been measured at 2.5 mas.

== Variability ==
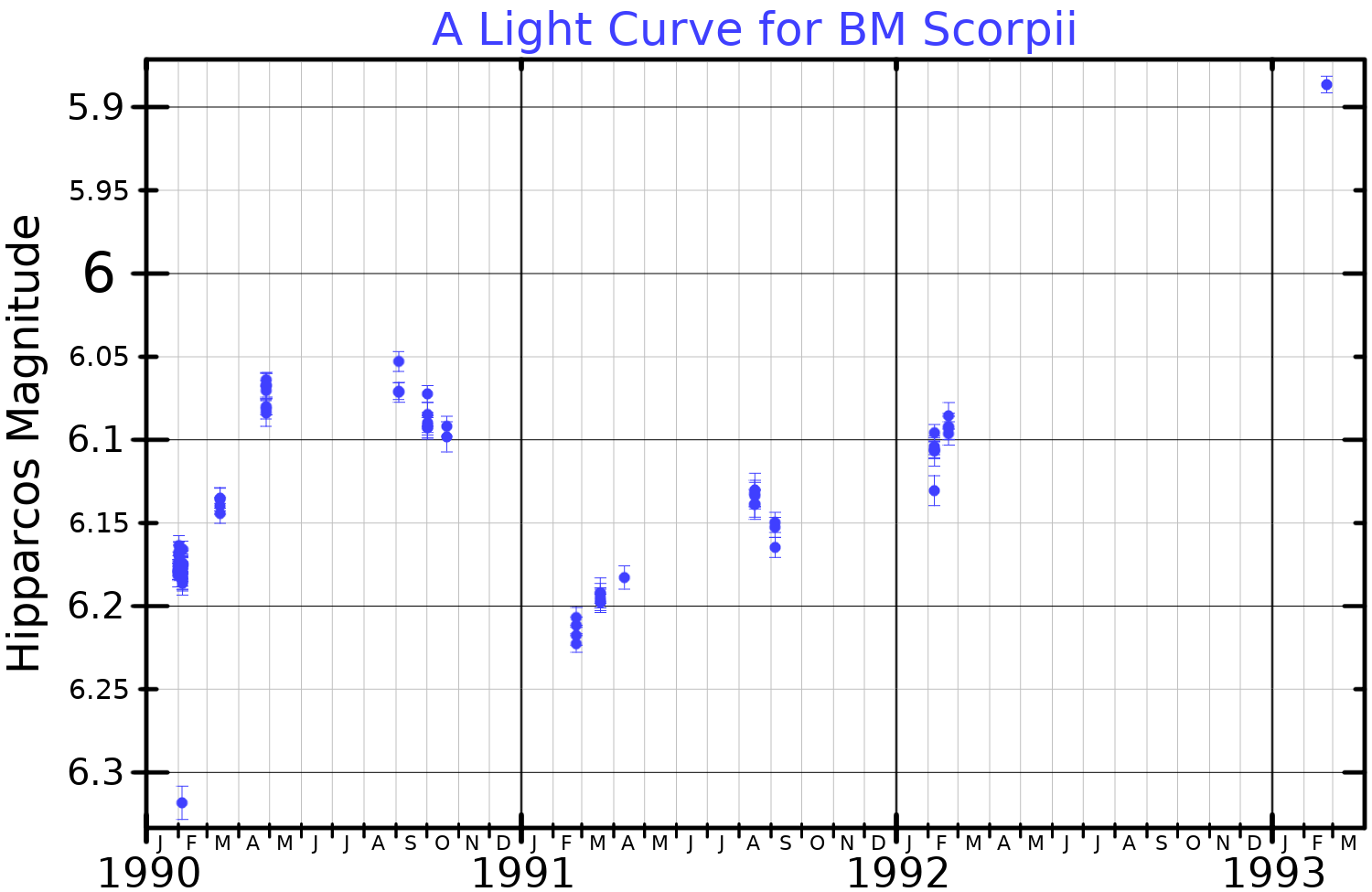
A light curve for BM Scorpii, plotted from Hipparcos data

In 1920 Annie Cannon discovered that BM Scorpii is a variable star, and it was included in the first edition of the General Catalogue of Variable Stars. The brightness variations between apparent magnitudes 5.25 and 6.46 are not entirely regular, but were reported to show a primary period of 815 days. In Hipparcos satellite photometry, the dominant variation period is 4.6 days with an amplitude of 0.05 magnitudes. No secondary period longer than 815 days was detected.
