= YBP 1194 =

Star in the constellation Cancer

Observation data Epoch J2000.0 Equinox ICRS
- Constellation: Cancer
- Right ascension: 08^{h} 51^{m} 00.80527^{s}
- Declination: +11° 48′ 52.7956″
- Apparent magnitude (V): 14.676

Characteristics
- Evolutionary stage: main sequence
- Spectral type: G5V
- B−V color index: 0.626

Astrometry
Radial velocity (R_{v})	+36.5±0.9 km/s
Proper motion (μ)	RA: −10.813 mas/yr Dec.: −2.732 mas/yr
Parallax (π)	1.1297±0.0242 mas
Distance	2,890 ± 60 ly (890 ± 20 pc)

Details
Mass	1.01±0.02 M_{☉}
Radius	0.99±0.02 R_{☉}
Luminosity	0.93 L_{☉}
Surface gravity (log g)	4.44±0.035 cgs
Temperature	5780±27 K
Metallicity [Fe/H]	0.023±0.015 dex
Age	4.15±0.65 Gyr

Other designations
- NGC 2682 YBP 1194, ES 4063, ES IV-63, FBC 2867, MMJ 5357, SAND 770, EPIC 211411531, TIC 437034946, 2MASS J08510080+1148527

Database references
SIMBAD	data

YBP 1194 is a G-type main-sequence star, class G5V, in the open cluster Messier 67, about 2,890 light-years (890 parsecs) from the Sun in the constellation Cancer. It is a solar twin, having the near-exact temperature and mass as the Sun. YBP 1194 has a slightly higher metallicity than the Sun, and may be slightly younger at an age of 3.5-4.8 billion years. In January 2014, this star was announced to have an exoplanet.

This system is packed in a small cluster, Messier 67, with a radius of 10 light-years, with over 500 other stars. For comparison, the Sun has 9 star systems within 10 light-years and 94 star systems within 20 light-years.

== Planetary system ==
The exoplanet YBP 1194 b was discovered in January 2014 by researchers at the European Southern Observatory (ESO) as one of three new planets discovered in the M67 cluster, showing that open star clusters are more likely to have planets in them than previously thought. The exoplanet is at least 100 times more massive than Earth, which is comparable in mass to Saturn. YBP 1194 b orbits its star with a 7-day period at a distance of 0.07 AU, closer than the planet Mercury is to the Sun. The combination of its large mass and close orbit makes this planet a hot Jupiter. The orbital eccentricity of YPB 1194 b is about 0.3, greater than Pluto's eccentricity of 0.25.

The YBP 1194 planetary system
Companion (in order from star)	Mass	Semimajor axis (AU)	Orbital period (days)	Eccentricity	Inclination (°)	Radius
b	≥0.33±0.03 M_{J}	0.0716	6.960±0.001	0.31±0.08	—	—
