= Gaia 1 =

Open cluster in the constellation Canis Major

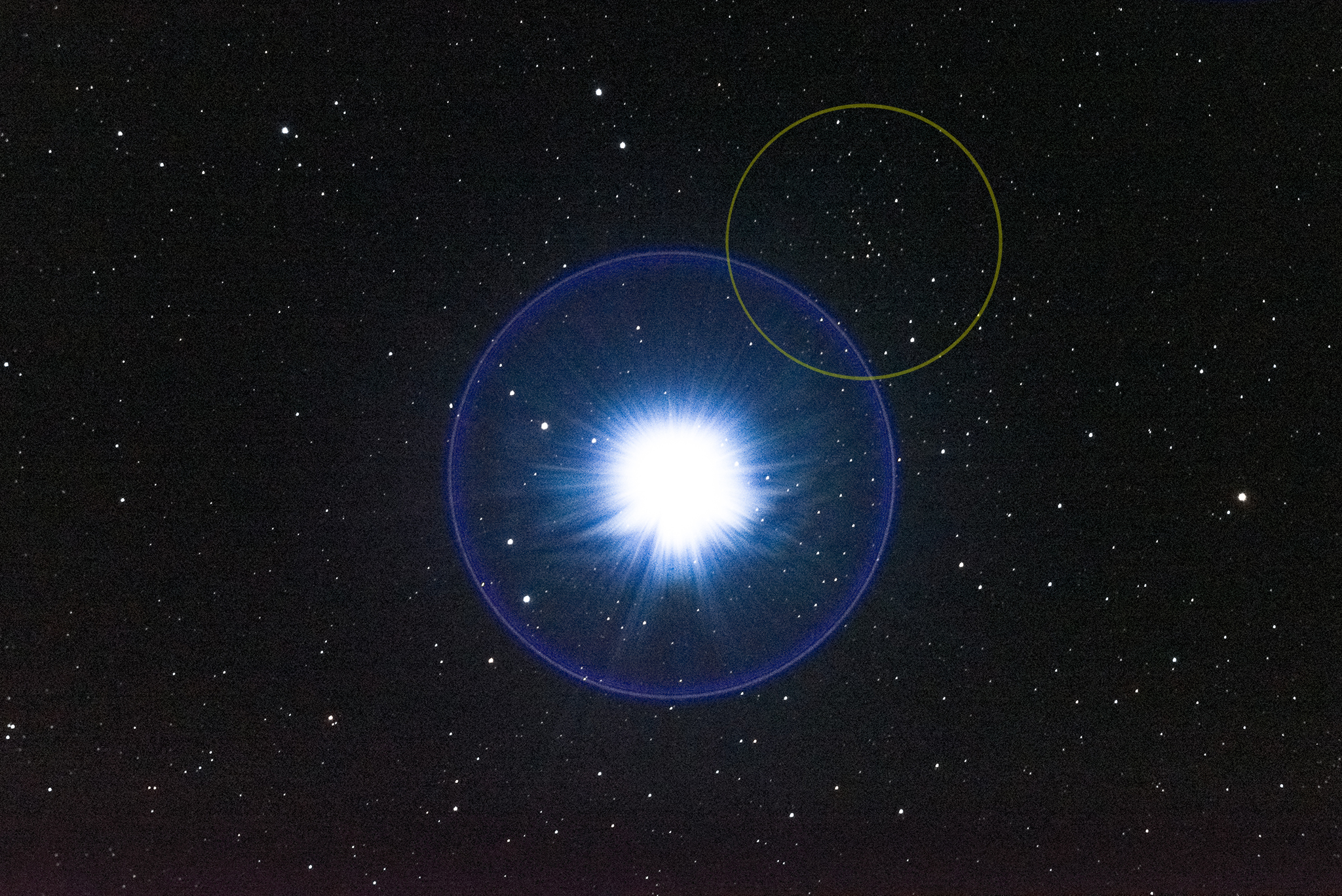
- Sirius and the Gaia 1 cluster

Observation data (J2000 epoch)
- Right ascension: 6^{h} 45^{m} 52.8^{s}
- Declination: −16° 45′ 00″
- Distance: 15 kly (4.6 kpc)
- Apparent dimensions (V): 13 arcmins

Physical characteristics
- Mass: 2.2×10^{4} M_{☉}
- Radius: 29 ly
- Estimated age: 6.3 Gyr

Associations
- Constellation: Canis Major

Location of Gaia 1 (circled)

Gaia 1 is an open cluster of stars discovered in 2017 by astronomers using data from the Gaia Space Observatory. It is a high-mass and bright cluster, but it remained unseen in prior astronomy due to veiling glare in ordinary telescopes overwhelmed by the star Sirius, which lies 10 arcmins west. Its half-light radius is about 29 light-years (9 pc), assuming a distance of 15,000 light-years (4,600 pc), and it has an estimated mass of about 22,000 M_{☉}.

Researchers detected the Gaia 1 cluster applying automated "star gauging" to the Gaia observatory's data on star locations. This analysis surprisingly indicated a prominent concentration of stars, previously unknown and uncataloged, adjacent to Sirius. Gaia observed a cluster population of approximately 1,200 stars down to Gaia magnitude 19. Analysis of 2MASS data for those stars shows a red-giant branch and a pronounced red clump that allows the absolute magnitude of the stars to be deduced and the distance calculated. Fitting the red giant branch also allows the age of the cluster to be calculated at 6.3 billion years.
