= NGC 188 =

Open cluster in the constellation Cepheus

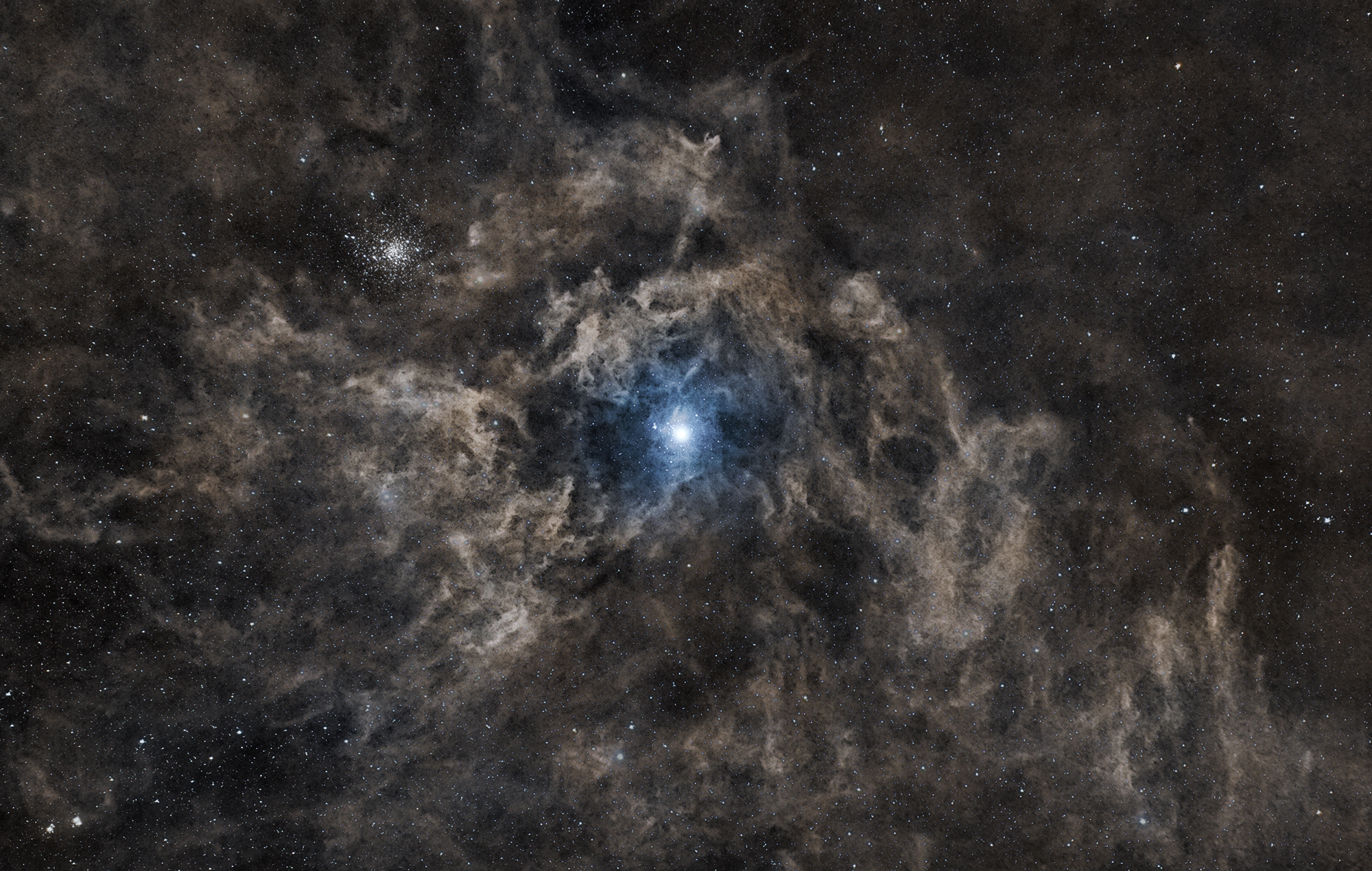
- Deep exposure of Polaris, integrated flux nebulae, and NGC 188

Observation data (J2000 epoch)
- Right ascension: 00^{h} 48^{m} 26^{s}
- Declination: +85° 15.3′
- Distance: 6,000 ly (1.85 kpc)
- Apparent magnitude (V): 10.0
- Absolute magnitude (V): Unknown
- Apparent dimensions (V): 15′

Physical characteristics
- Radius: 11.8 ly
- Estimated age: 6.41 ± 0.33 Gyr
- One of the oldest known open clusters
- Other designations: Caldwell 1, Cr 6, Mel 2

Associations
- Constellation: Cepheus

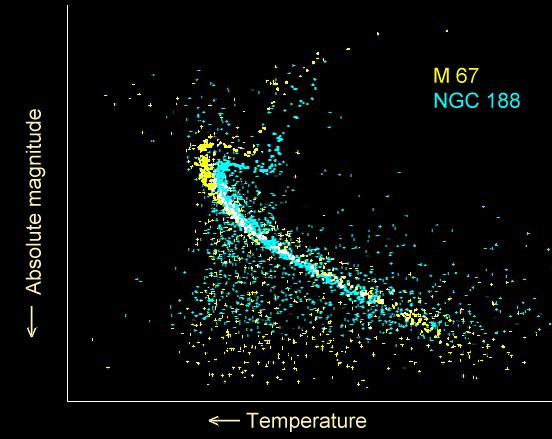
HR diagram showing the main sequence turnoff of NGC 188 and M 67, indicating their relatively high ages

NGC 188 (also known as Caldwell 1 or the Polarissima Cluster) is an open cluster in the constellation Cepheus. It was discovered by John Herschel in 1831. Unlike most open clusters that drift apart after a few million years because of the gravitational interaction of our Milky Way galaxy, NGC 188 lies far above the plane of the galaxy and is one of the most ancient of open clusters known, at approximately 6.8 billion years old.

NGC 188 is very close to the North Celestial Pole, under five degrees away, and in the constellation of Cepheus at an estimated 6,000 light-years' distance, this puts it slightly above the Milky Way's disc and further from the center of the galaxy than the Sun.
