= Messier 35 =

Open cluster in the constellation Gemini

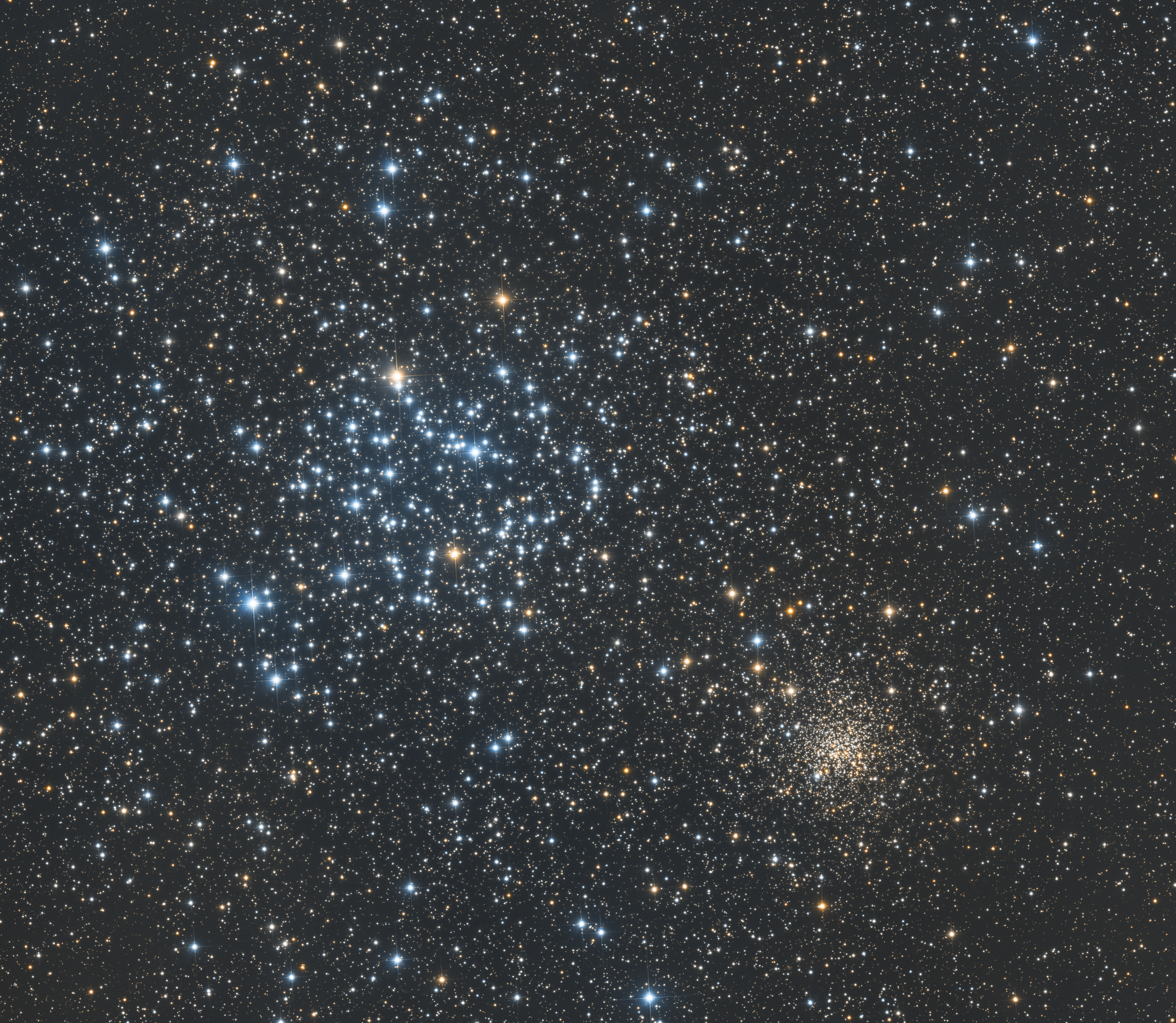
- Messier 35 (left-center) with NGC 2158 at lower right

Observation data (J2000 epoch)
- Right ascension: 06^{h} 08^{m} 54.0^{s}
- Declination: +24° 20′ 00″
- Distance: 2,970 ly (912 pc)
- Apparent magnitude (V): 5.3
- Apparent dimensions (V): 28 arcmins

Physical characteristics
- Mass: 1,600 M_{☉}
- Radius: 11 ly
- Estimated age: 100 Myr
- Other designations: M35, NGC 2168, Cr 82, C 0605+243

Associations
- Constellation: Gemini

Messier 35 or M35, also known as NGC 2168 or the Shoe-Buckle Cluster, is a relatively close open cluster of stars in the west of Gemini, at about the declination of the Sun when the latter is at June solstice. (Note: Hence M35 cannot be seen from the Antarctic Circle) It was discovered by Philippe Loys de Chéseaux around 1745 and independently discovered by John Bevis before 1750. It is scattered over part of the sky almost the size of the full moon and is 2,970 light-years (912 parsecs) away. The compact open cluster NGC 2158 lies directly southwest of it.

Leonard & Merritt (1989) computed the mass of M35 using a statistical technique based on proper motion velocities of its stars. The mass within the central 3.75 parsecs (12.2 ly) was found to be between 1600 and 3200 solar masses, (Note: with 95 percent confidence) consistent with the mass of a realistic stellar population within the same radius. Bouy et al. in 2015 found a mass of around 1,600 M_{☉} within the central 27.5' × 27.5′. There are 305 stars that can be intrinsically shown to be extremely likely to be members, (Note: have values that give a confidence of 95% or higher) and up to 4,349 averaging the 50% membership probability, from the kinematic (such as parallax and proper motion) and spectral data published before 2015. The cluster's metallicity is [Fe/H] = −0.21±0.10, where −1 would be ten times less metallic than the sun.

Of 418 probable members, Leiner et al. in 2015 found 64 that have variable radial velocities thus are binary star systems. Four probable members are chemically peculiars, while HD 41995, which in the (telescopic angular) cluster field, shows emission lines. Hu et al. in 2005 found 13 variable stars in the field; at least three are suspect as cluster members. To be a member means to have a gravitational tie or, if recently freed, having been created by the same event.

== See also ==
- List of Messier objects
