= NGC 6281 =

Open cluster in the constellation of Scorpius

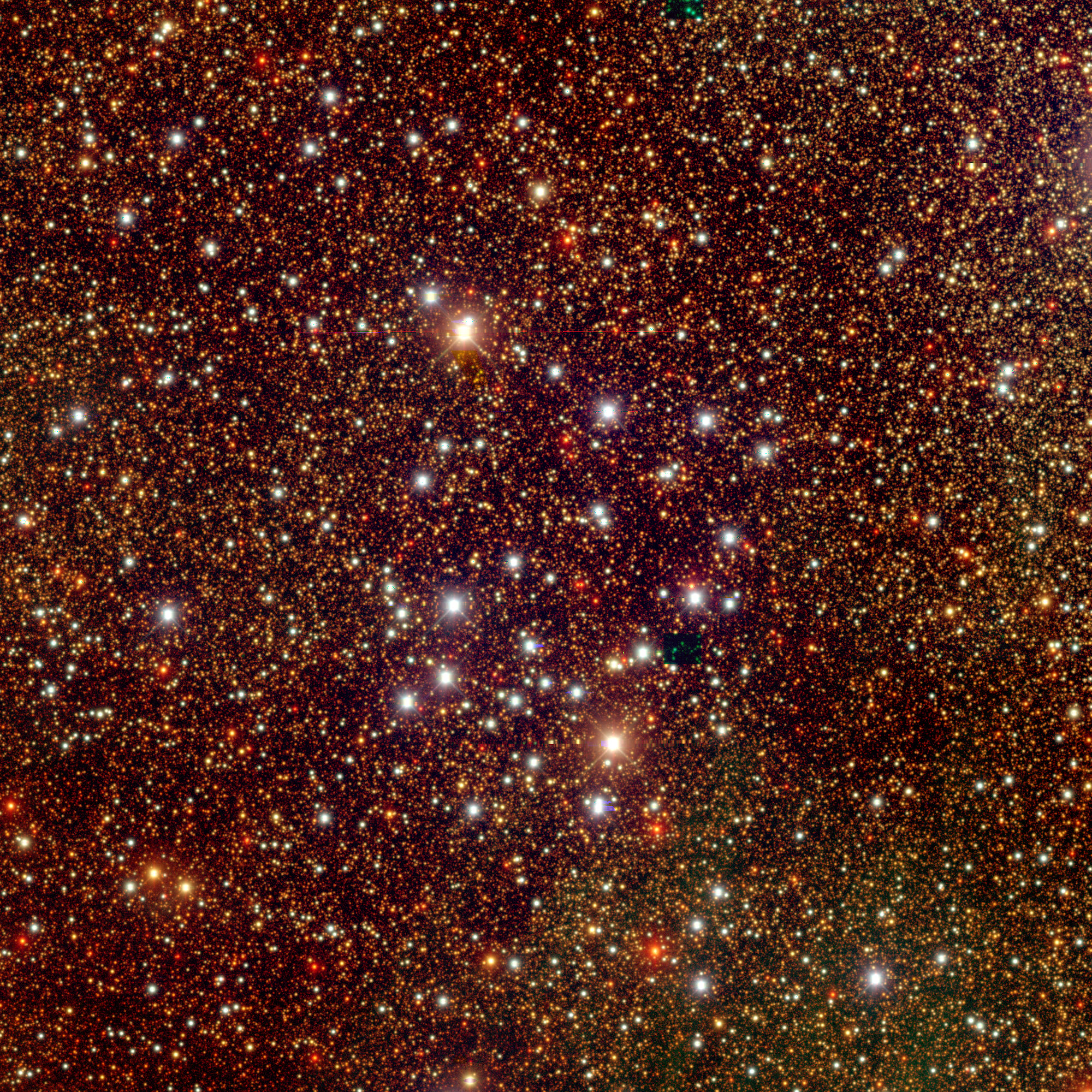
- NGC 6281

Observation data (J2000 epoch)
- Right ascension: 17^{h} 04.7^{m}
- Declination: −37° 59′
- Distance: 1,611 ly (494 pc)
- Apparent magnitude (V): 5.4

Physical characteristics
- Mass: 214 M_{☉}
- Estimated age: 3.23 × 10^{8} yr
- Other designations: C 1701-378

Associations
- Constellation: Scorpius

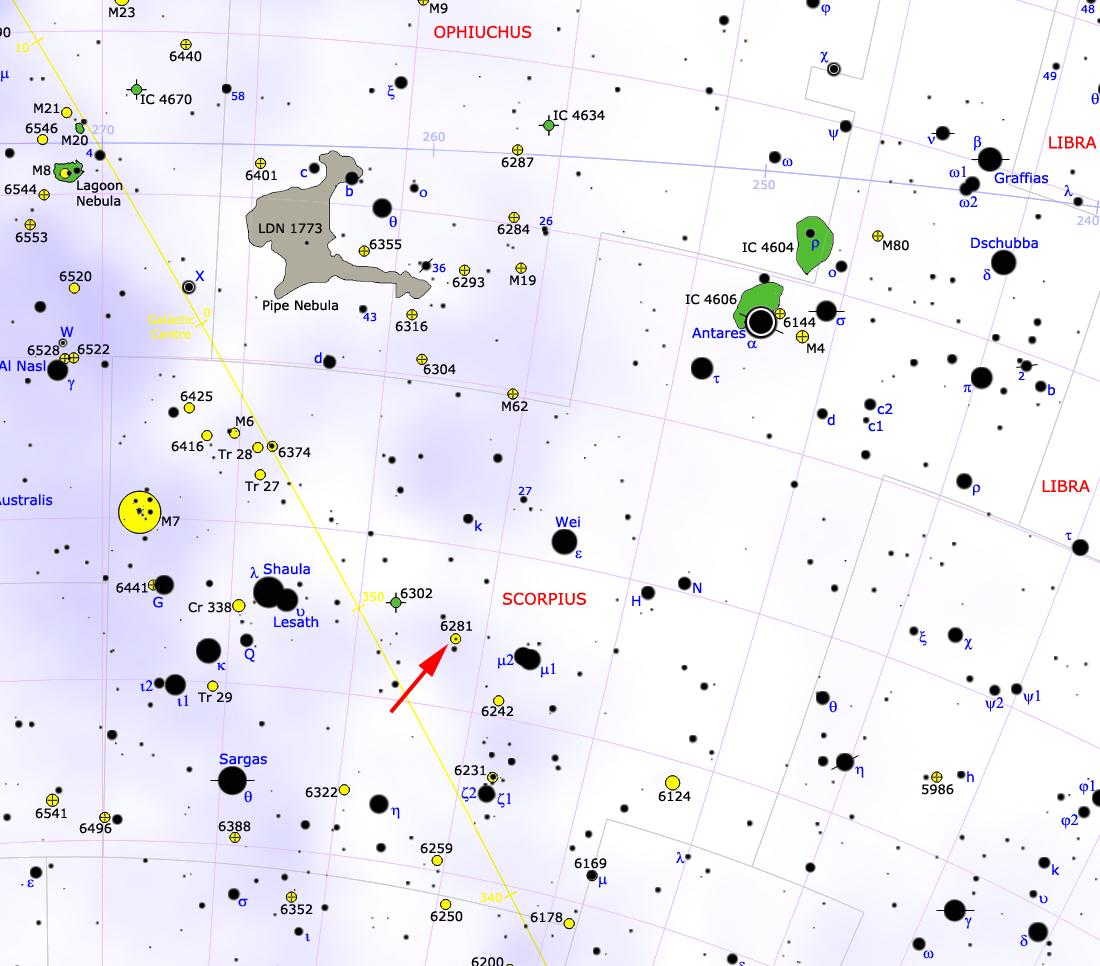
location of NGC 6281

NGC 6281 (also informally known as the Moth Wing Cluster) is an open cluster of stars in the constellation Scorpius. It was not included in the Messier or Caldwell catalogues of nebulous objects, but it is the brightest such cluster in the constellation to be left out of both. It is readily observed with the naked eye; it is located about 2° to the east of Mu Scorpii. James Dunlop described the cluster as a "curiously curved line of pretty bright stars, with many stars mixt". John Herschel then described the cluster as both "pretty bright" and "pretty rich".

This cluster has a tidal radius of 26 ly (8.0 pc) and a mass of about 214 solar masses. It is classified as a type II2p cluster and has 55 members with a visual magnitude of 13.5 or greater within 20 arcminutes of the center. The brightest member is 9th magnitude. Overall, the cluster has an integrated visual magnitude of 5.4.
