= NGC 6087 =

Open cluster in the constellation Norma

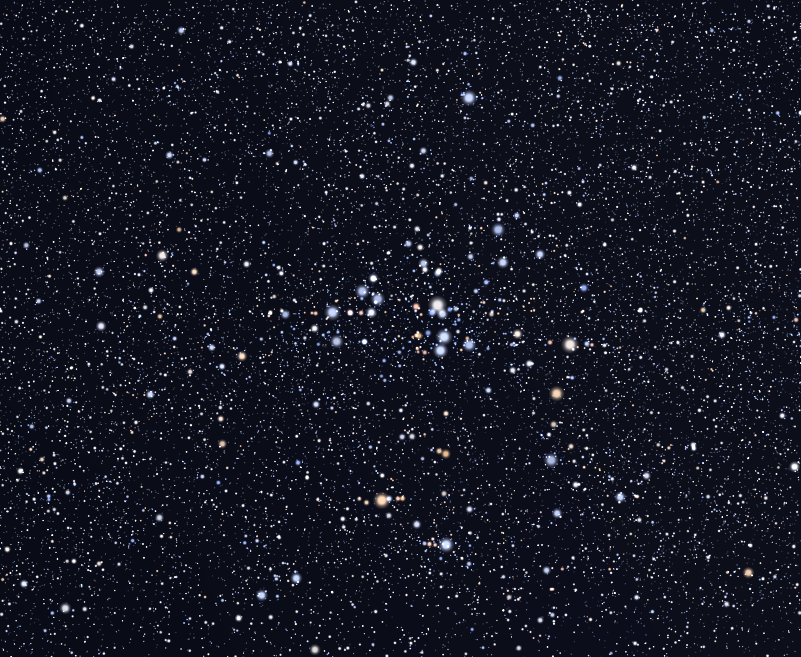

Observation data (J2000 epoch)
- Right ascension: 16^{h} 18^{m} 48^{s}
- Declination: −57° 56′
- Distance: ~3500LY (~1000pc)
- Apparent magnitude (V): 5.4
- Apparent dimensions (V): 12′

Physical characteristics
- Other designations: S Normae Cluster, Caldwell 89, Cr 300

Associations
- Constellation: Norma

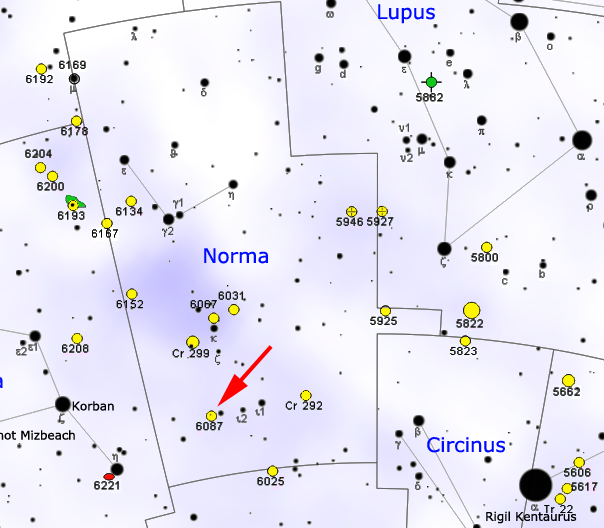
Map showing the location of NGC 6087

NGC 6087 (also known as Caldwell 89 or the S Normae Cluster) is an open cluster of 40 or more stars centered on the Cepheid variable S Normae in the constellation Norma. At a distance of about 3500 ly and covering a field of almost one quarter of a degree, the stars range from seventh- to eleventh-magnitude, the brightest being 6.5 magnitude S Normae. The aggregate visual magnitude of the cluster is about 5.4.

Spectral analysis of the radial motion of the stars confirm that S Normae is a member of the cluster, and the period/luminosity relationship of Cepheid variables allows the distance to be determined with confidence.
