= V Centauri =

Variable star in the constellation Centaurus

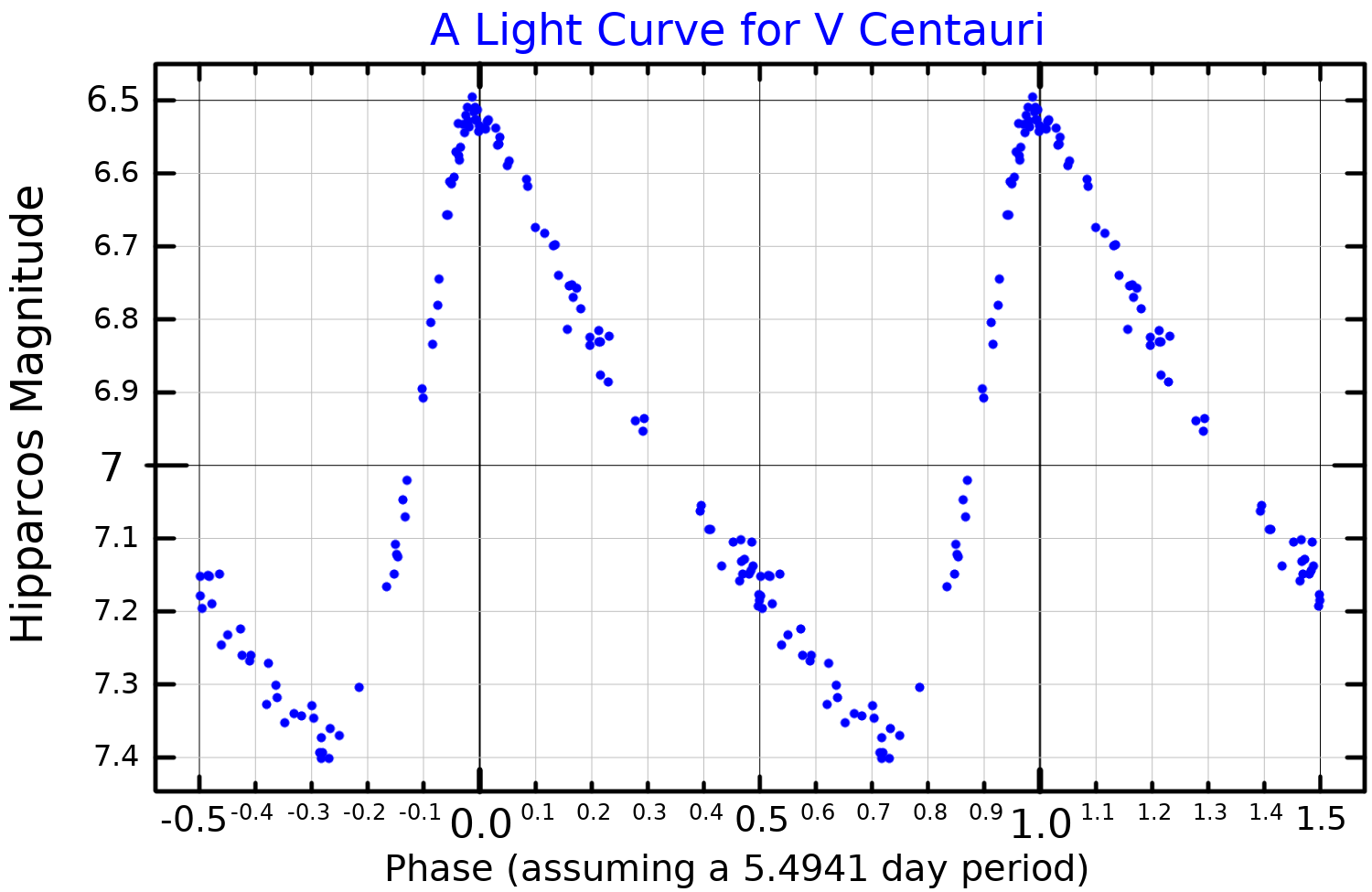
- A light curve for V Centauri, plotted from Hipparcos data

Observation data Epoch J2000 Equinox ICRS
- Constellation: Centaurus
- Right ascension: 14^{h} 32^{m} 33.0833^{s}
- Declination: −56° 53′ 15.774″
- Apparent magnitude (V): 6.42 - 7.22

Characteristics
- Spectral type: F5 Ib/II
- B−V color index: 0.87
- Variable type: Classical Cepheid

Astrometry
Radial velocity (R_{v})	−18.90 ± 1.4 km/s
Proper motion (μ)	RA: −6.697 mas/yr Dec.: −7.068 mas/yr
Parallax (π)	1.3898±0.0221 mas
Distance	2,350 ± 40 ly (720 ± 10 pc)

Details
Mass	4.3 M_{☉}
Radius	40 R_{☉}
Luminosity	1,657 L_{☉}
Surface gravity (log g)	1.89 cgs
Temperature	5,500 K
Metallicity [Fe/H]	+0.12 dex
Age	103 Myr

Other designations
- V Cen, CD−56°5479, HD 127297, HIP 71116, HR 5421, SAO 241777

Database references
SIMBAD	data

V Centauri (V Cen) is a Classical Cepheid variable, a type of variable star, in the constellation Centaurus. It is approximately 2,350 light-years (720 parsecs) away based on parallax.

Alexander W. Roberts discovered this star in 1894, and from 267 visual observations he determined is period of variation. V Centauri varies regularly between visual magnitudes 6.42 and 7.22 every 5.5 days. It is classified as a Cepheid variable on the basis of its light variations, with the brightness increase from minimum to maximum taking only a third of the time of the decrease from maximum to minimum. Cepheids are pulsating variable stars and V Centauri expands and contracts over its pulsation cycle as well as changing temperature.

According to the South African Astronomical Observatory, the chemical composition was derived as being high in sodium (Na) and aluminium (Al) and low in magnesium (Mg). Following a normal composition for a Cepheid star, V Cen does not have any unusual characteristics. V Centauri's composition was observed alongside six other Classical Cepheid variable stars with the support of Russian, Chilean, and Ukrainian observatories.
