= NGC 637 =

Open star cluster in the constellation Cassiopeia

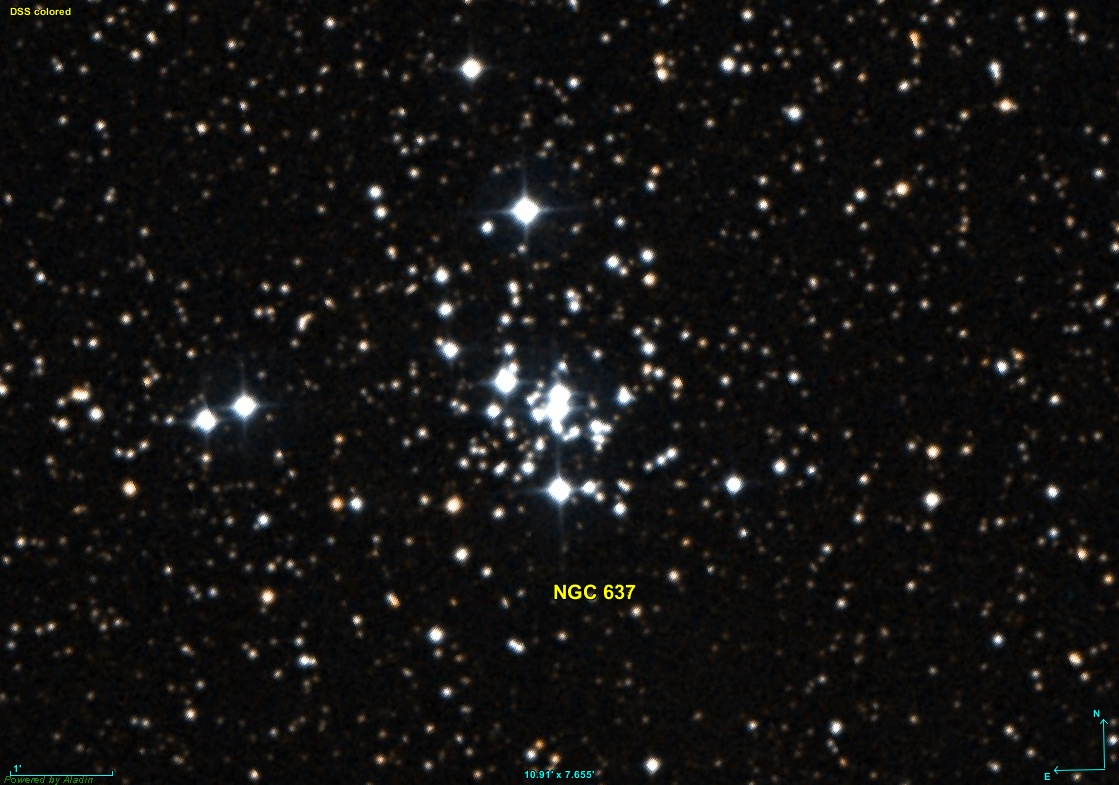

Observation data (J2000.0 epoch)
- Right ascension: 01^{h} 43^{m} 04.0^{s}
- Declination: +64° 02′ 24″
- Distance: 7.045 ± 1.409 kly (2.160 ± 0.432 kpc)
- Apparent magnitude (V): 8.2
- Apparent dimensions (V): 4.2′

Physical characteristics
- Estimated age: 10 ± 5 Myr
- Other designations: Cr 17, NGC 637

Associations
- Constellation: Cassiopeia

NGC 637 is an open cluster of stars in the northern constellation of Cassiopeia, positioned about 1.5° to the WNW of the star Epsilon Cassiopeiae. The cluster was discovered on 9 November 1787 by German-born English astronomer William Herschel. It is located in the Perseus Arm of the Milky Way, at a distance of approximately 7,045 light years from the Sun. The cluster is small but compact, and is readily visible in a small telescope.

This is a young cluster with an estimated age of 5–15 million years. It has a Trumpler class of I2m, indicating it is strongly concentrated (I) with an intermediate range of brightness variation (2) and a moderate richness of stars (m). The cluster has 55 members and an angular radius of 4′.2, corresponding to a physical radius of 9.8 ly (3.0 pc). It has a core radius of 0.36′±0.13′.

The seven brightest members are all over 10th magnitude, with five known to be variable. A total of four β Cephei-type variables have been identified, one of the highest such totals for an open cluster. A classical Be star candidate has been detected. The distribution of the cluster's stars on the Hertzsprung–Russell diagram shows a noticeable gap on the main sequence, which is not explained by missing data.
