= NGC 6242 =

Open cluster in Scorpius

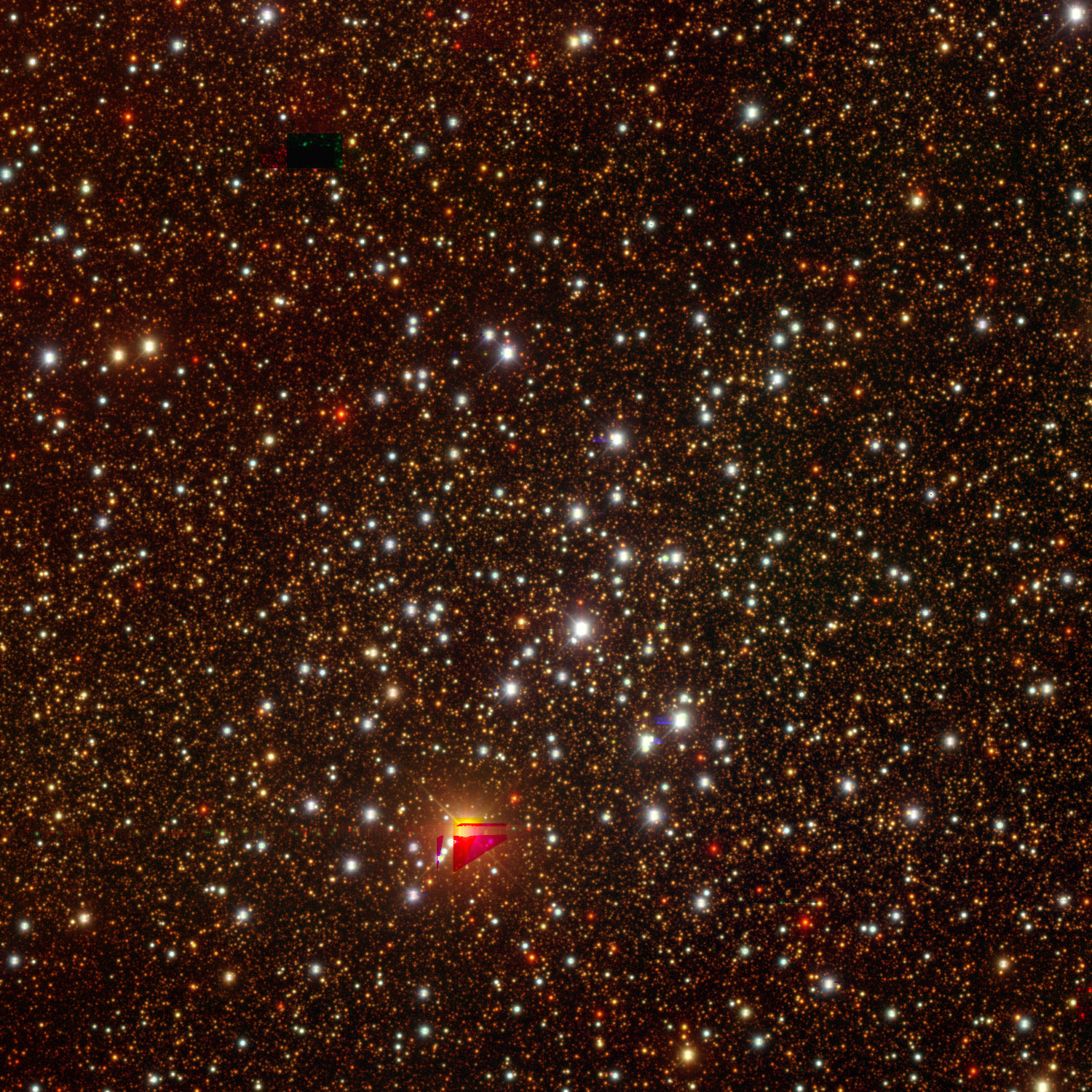
- NGC 6242; Credit: DECaPS

Observation data (J2000 epoch)
- Right ascension: 16^{h} 55^{m} 30.7^{s}
- Declination: −39° 28′ 26″
- Distance: 4.35 ± 0.53 kly (1.335 ± 0.163 kpc)
- Apparent magnitude (V): 6.4
- Apparent dimensions (V): 9′

Physical characteristics
- Estimated age: 77.6 Myr
- Other designations: NGC 6242, Cr 317

Associations
- Constellation: Scorpius

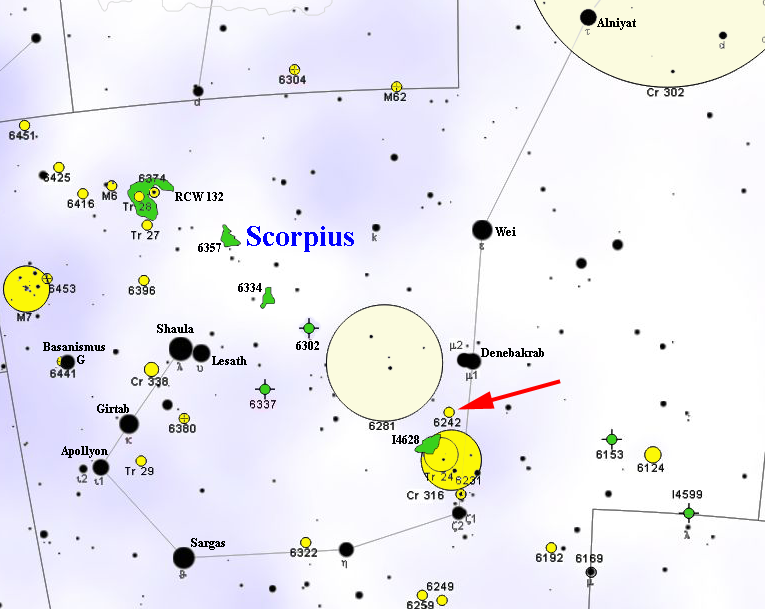
Map showing the location of NGC 6242

NGC 6242 is an open cluster of stars in the southern constellation Scorpius. It can be viewed with binoculars or a telescope at about 1.5° to the south-southeast of the double star Mu Scorpii. This cluster was discovered by French astronomer Nicolas-Louis de Lacaille in 1752 from South Africa. It is located at a distance of approximately 4,350 ly (1,335 pc) from the Sun, just to the north of the Sco OB 1 association. The cluster has an estimated age of 77.6 million years.

A microquasar with the designation GRO J1655-40 is located in the vicinity of NGC 6242 and is moving away from the cluster with a runaway space velocity of 112±18 km/s. It may have originated in the cluster during a supernova explosion ~2.2×10^{5} year ago.
