= NGC 2158 =

Open cluster in the constellation Gemini

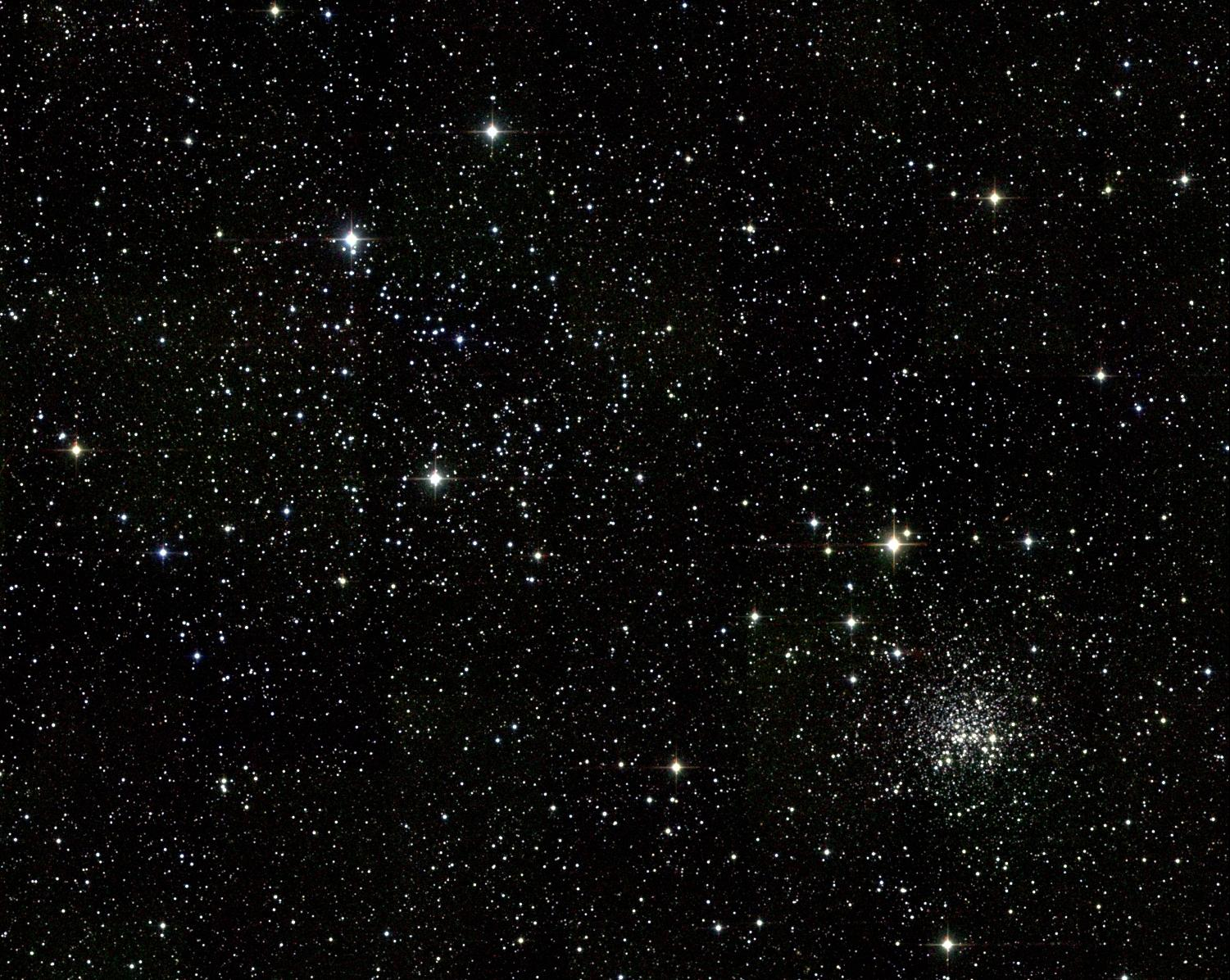
- NGC 2158 to the lower right of M35; Credit: 2MASS/NASA

Observation data (J2000 epoch)
- Right ascension: 06^{h} 07^{m} 25^{s}
- Declination: +24° 05.8′
- Distance: 11,000+ ly (3600±400 pc)
- Apparent magnitude (V): 8.6
- Apparent dimensions (V): 5′

Physical characteristics
- Mass: 3067 ±69.84 M_{☉}
- Radius: 8 ly
- Estimated age: ~2 billion yrs
- Other designations: OCL 468, Lund 206, Melotte 40

Associations
- Constellation: Gemini
- Galaxy: Milky Way

NGC 2158 is an open cluster of stars in the constellation of Gemini. Alternatively, it may be identified as OCL 468, Lund 206 or Melotte 40. This cluster is located around 11,000 light years (3600 ±400 pc) from Earth. It is about 2 billion years old, making it an intermediate age cluster. The cluster is populous with stars, containing some 3000 ±69 stars within a radius of about 8 light years.

It is, in angle, immediately southwest of open cluster Messier 35. The two clusters are unrelated, as the subject is around 9,000 light years further away.

== History ==
Once thought to be a globular cluster, it is now known to be a metal-poor open cluster that is a member of the old thin disk population. It was first classed as such by Trumpler, but later Shapley would classify it as an open cluster due to its diffuse core. NGC 2158 has been studied numerous times. A study from Arp & Cuffey (1962) was the first study of NGC 2158. It obtained photographic photometry for about 900 stars and determined the cluster to be an intermediate between regular star clusters and globular clusters. Later, the photometry of more than 2000 stars would be obtained by Karchenko, Andruk & Schilbach (1997).

== Properties ==
NGC 2158 has unusual properties for an open cluster (OC). Its rich stellar content and brightness initially makes it appear as a globular cluster (GC): only with suitable equipment can the diffuse nature of the cluster be seen. It also has a red giant population similar to GCs. However it is not a GC, but is rather an intermediate object between globular clusters and regular star clusters.

The cluster has anomalously low amount of metals making it metal-poor. It has been estimated that NGC 2158 is around 2 billion years old. This would make the cluster of intermediate-age.

== Contents ==
NGC 2158 is a populous cluster with many low to intermediate mass stars. NGC 2158 has three mass regimes: high mass stars, low mass stars and very low mass stars. Data used from the third edition of the Gaia Data Release (DR3) revealed that there are 3067 ±69.84 stars totaling to a mass of 3216.4 ±59.50 solar masses. There is a red giant population. The cluster also has a M-dwarf discontinuity. It also contains a cataclysmic variable (CV) star (the fourth known to exist in an open cluster) and five Delta Scuti variables (δ Scuti).

Due to the distance of NGC 2158, most binary systems that survived inside the dense environment are unable to be resolved. Instead, these systems appear as point-like sources with the exception of wide binary systems which can be resolved as two distinct sources.

== Additional images ==
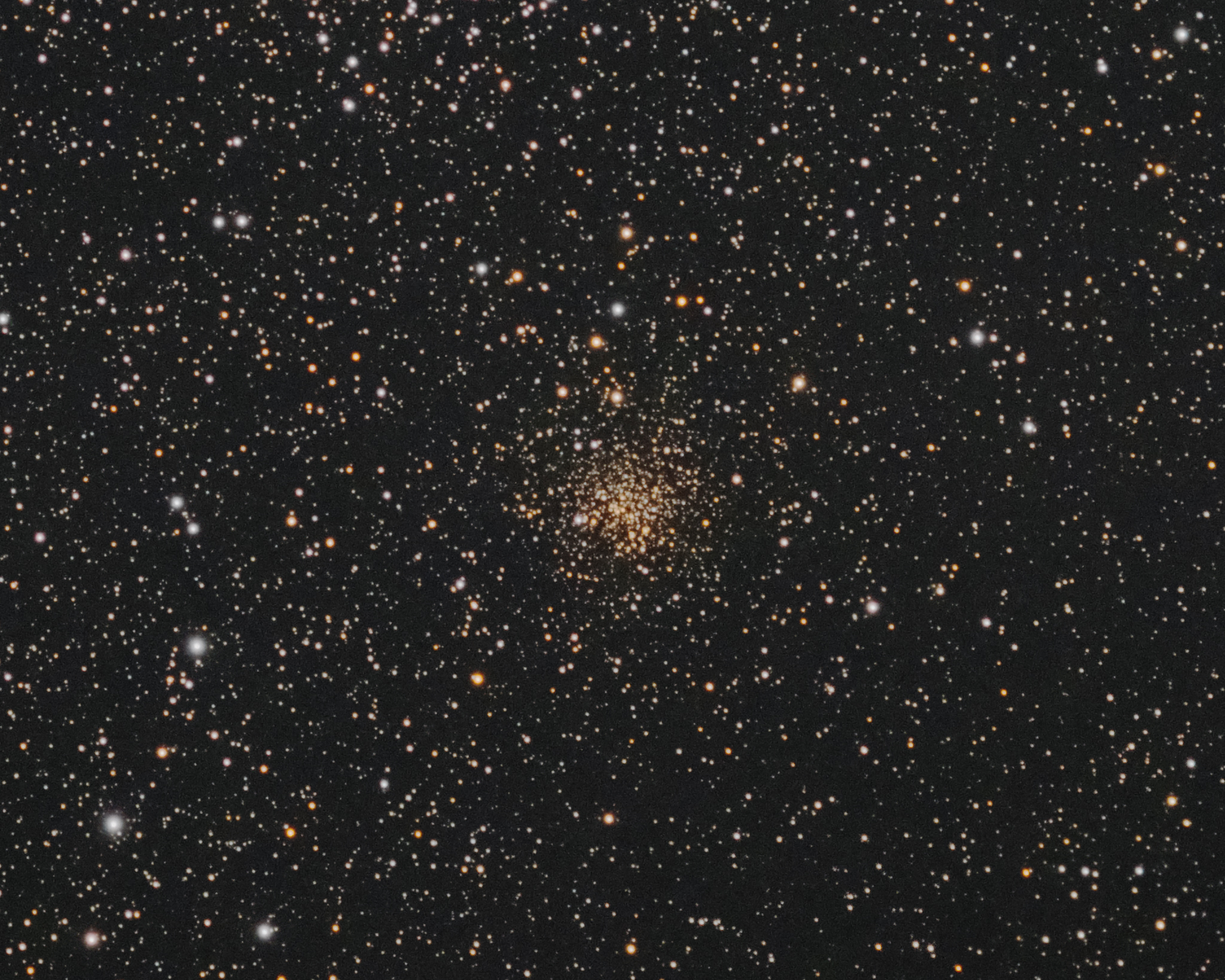
Amateur astronomer photo of NGC 2158.
