= NGC 129 =

Open cluster in the constellation Cassiopeia

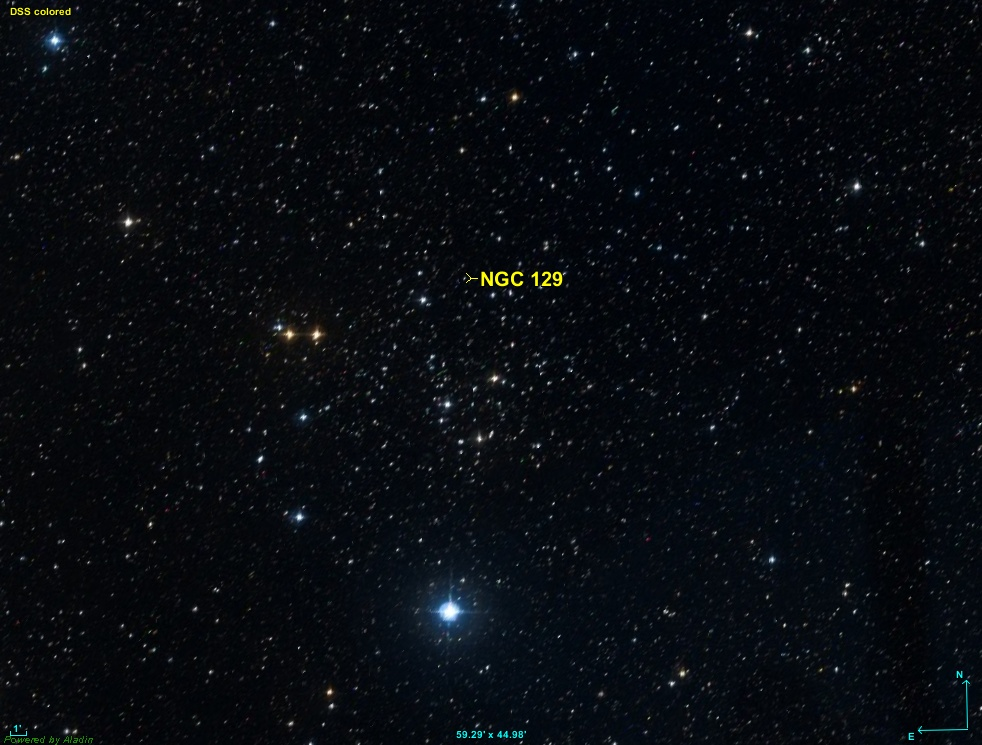
- DSS image of NGC 129

Observation data (J2000 epoch)
- Right ascension: 00^{h} 30^{m} 00^{s}
- Declination: +60° 13′ 06″
- Distance: 5,450 ly (1,670 pc)
- Apparent magnitude (V): 6.5
- Apparent dimensions (V): 12′

Physical characteristics
- Estimated age: 76 millions years
- Other designations: Collinder 2

Associations
- Constellation: Cassiopeia

NGC 129 is an open cluster stars in the northern constellation of Cassiopeia. It was discovered by William Herschel in 1788. It is located almost exactly halfway between the bright stars Caph (β Cassiopeiae) and γ Cassiopeiae. It is large but not dense and can be observed by binoculars, through which the most obvious component is a small triangle of stars of magnitude 8 and 9, located in the center of the cluster.

NGC 129 contains several giant stars. The brightest member of the cluster is DL Cassiopeiae, a binary system which contains a Cepheid variable with a 8,00 day period. Using the fluctuations of the brightness of DL Cassiopeia from 8,7 to 9,28, Gieren et al. in 1994 determined the distance of NGC 129 to be 2034 ±110 pc (6.630 ±360 ly), much larger than the distance obtained by Turner et al. (1992), who obtained a distance of 1,670 ±13 pc from ZAMS fitting of the cluster. A possible cause of this difference is the different level of obstruction of light and star reddening of the stars of the cluster. One more cepheid variable, V379 Cas, is also a possible member of NGC 129.
