= NGC 2232 =

Open cluster in the constellation Monoceros

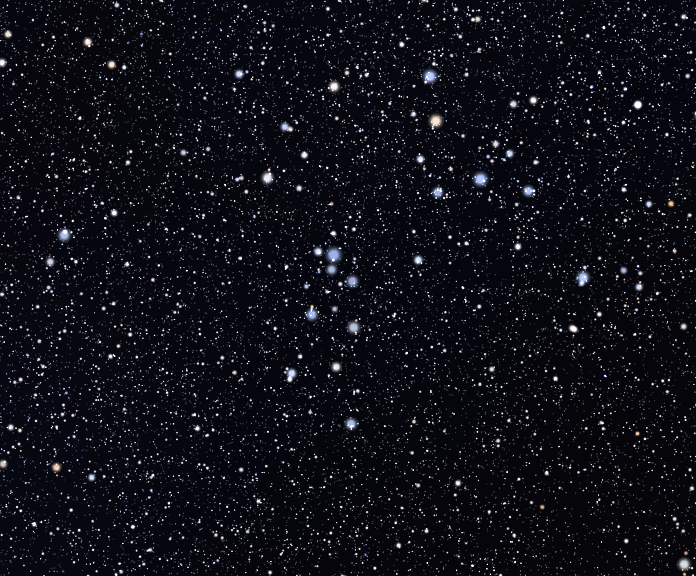
- NGC 2232 (taken from Stellarium)

Observation data (J2000 epoch)
- Right ascension: 06^{h} 27^{m} 15^{s}
- Declination: –04° 45′ 30″
- Distance: 1,060 ly (325 pc)
- Apparent magnitude (V): 3.9
- Apparent dimensions (V): 30′

Physical characteristics
- Mass: < 100 M_{☉}
- Radius: ~15 ly
- Estimated age: 30.9 Myr
- Other designations: Cr 93, C 0624-047

Associations
- Constellation: Monoceros

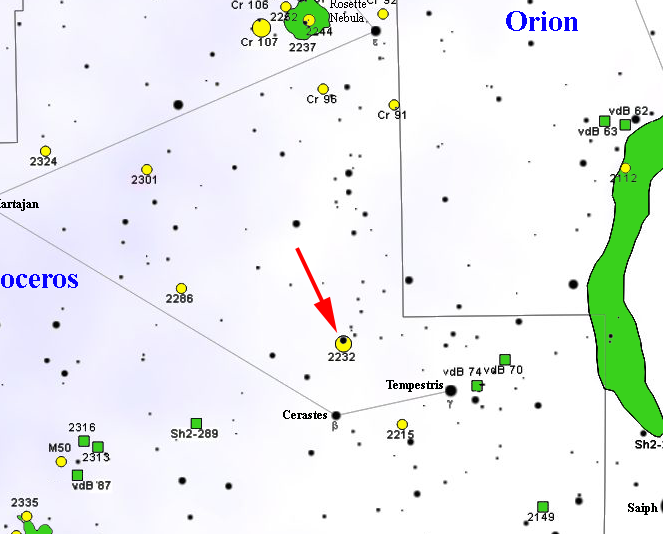
Map showing the location of NGC 2232

NGC 2232 is a bright open star cluster in the equatorial constellation of Monoceros, centered on the star 10 Monocerotis. It is located in the Gould Belt close to the Orion Nebula cluster, at a mean distance of 1,060 ly from the Sun. The average radial velocity of the cluster members is 26.6±0.77 km/s. This is one of the nearest open clusters to the Sun, which makes it a potentially useful target for studying young stars and their transition to the main sequence.

The cluster has an angular radius of 36′ and a core angular radius of 7.2′. It is a sparse cluster with twenty high–probability members. This is considered a super-solar cluster, with the components generally having a higher abundance of iron compared to the Sun. The mean metallicity is 0.22±0.09 or 0.32±0.08, depending on what assumptions are made. At least four cluster members display an infrared excess at a wavelength of 8μm that is suggestive of warm dust, while the A-type star HD 45435 displays a strong excess at 24μm. The latter may indicate the star is in an early evolutionary state. Only one member of the cluster appears to be chemically peculiar.
