= Collinder catalogue =

Catalogue of open clusters made by Swedish astronomer Per Collinder

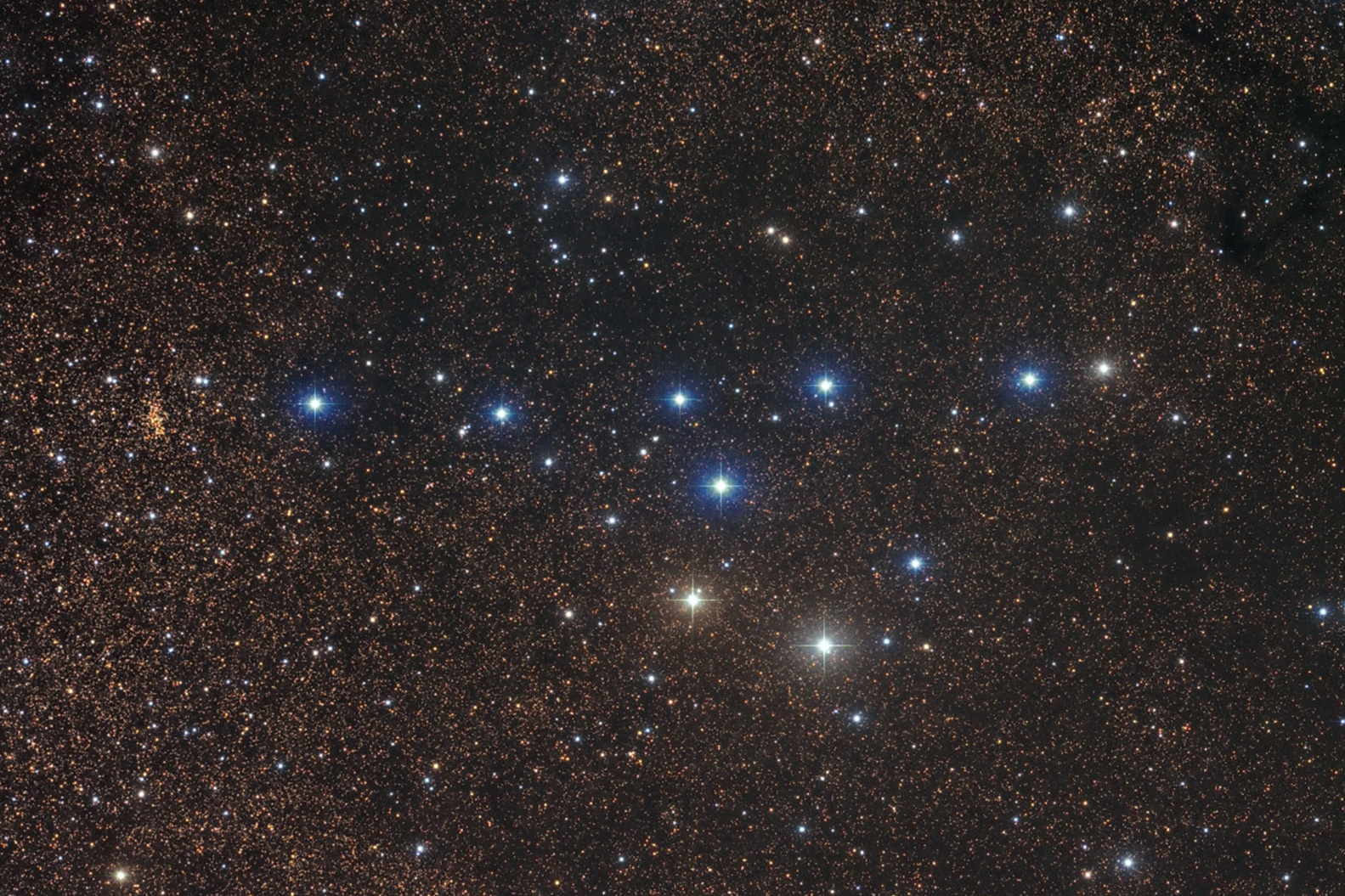
- Collinder 399, a prominent asterism in the constellation Vulpecula.
- Alternative names: Collinder catalog
- Related media on Commons

The Collinder catalogue is a catalogue of 471 open clusters compiled by Swedish astronomer Per Collinder. It was published in 1931 as an appendix to Collinder's paper On structural properties of open galactic clusters and their spatial distribution.

The catalogue contains 452 open clusters, 11 globular clusters, 6 asterisms, 1 stellar moving group, and 1 stellar association. Catalogue objects are denoted by Collinder, e.g. "Collinder 399". Dated prefixes include as Col + catalogue number, or Cr + catalogue number, e.g. "Cr 399".

== Star chart ==
Chart of Collinder catalogue objects

== Collinder objects ==
Collinder number	NGC/IC number	Other names	Image	Object type	Constellation	Apparent magnitude
Cr 1	NGC 103			Open cluster	Cassiopeia	9.8
Cr 2	NGC 129			Open cluster	Cassiopeia	6.5
Cr 3	NGC 133			Open cluster	Cassiopeia	9.4
Cr 4	NGC 136			Open cluster	Cassiopeia	11.3
Cr 5	NGC 146			Open cluster	Cassiopeia	9.1
Cr 6	NGC 188			Open cluster	Cepheus	8.1
Cr 7	NGC 225			Open cluster	Cassiopeia	7.0
Cr 8	IC 1590			Open cluster	Cassiopeia	7.4
Cr 9	NGC 366			Open cluster	Cassiopeia	12.0
Cr 10	NGC 381			Open cluster	Cassiopeia	9.3
Cr 11	NGC 436			Open cluster	Cassiopeia	8.8
Cr 12	NGC 457	Owl or E.T. Cluster		Open cluster	Cassiopeia	6.4
Cr 13	NGC 559			Open cluster	Cassiopeia	9.5
Cr 14	NGC 581			Open cluster	Cassiopeia	7.4
Cr 15	-	Trumpler 1		Open cluster	Cassiopeia	8.1
Cr 16	NGC 609			Open cluster	Cassiopeia	11.0
Cr 17	NGC 637			Open cluster	Cassiopeia	8.2
Cr 18	NGC 654			Open cluster	Cassiopeia	6.5
Cr 19	NGC 659			Open cluster	Cassiopeia	7.9
Cr 20	NGC 663			Open cluster	Cassiopeia	7.1
Cr 21	-			Asterism	Triangulum	7.3
Cr 22	NGC 744			Open cluster	Perseus	7.9
Cr 23	NGC 752			Open cluster	Andromeda	5.7
Cr 24	NGC 869	h Persei of Double Cluster		Open cluster	Perseus	5.3
Cr 25	NGC 884	χ Persei of Double Cluster		Open cluster	Perseus	6.1
Cr 26	IC 1805			Open cluster	Cassiopeia	7.9
Cr 27	NGC 956			Asterism	Andromeda	8.9
Cr 28	NGC 957			Open cluster	Perseus	7.6
Cr 29	-	Trumpler 2		Open cluster	Perseus	5.9
Cr 30	NGC 1027			Open cluster	Cassiopeia	6.7
Cr 31	NGC 1039			Open cluster	Perseus	5.2
Cr 32	IC 1848	Westerhout 5		Open cluster	Cassiopeia	6.5
Cr 33	IC 1848	Westerhout 5		Open cluster	Cassiopeia	5.9
Cr 34	IC 1848	Westerhout 5		Open cluster	Cassiopeia	6.8
Cr 35	NGC 1193			Open cluster	Perseus	12.6
Cr 36	-	Trumpler 3		Open cluster	Cassiopeia	7.0
Cr 37	NGC 1220			Open cluster	Perseus	11.8
Cr 38	NGC 1245			Open cluster	Perseus	8.4
Cr 39	-	Alpha Persei Cluster		Open cluster	Perseus	1.2
Cr 40	NGC 1342			Open cluster	Perseus	6.7
Cr 41	IC 348			Open cluster	Perseus	7.3
Cr 42	-	Pleiades		Open cluster	Taurus	1.2
Cr 43	NGC 1444			Open cluster	Perseus	6.6
Cr 44	NGC 1496			Open cluster	Perseus	9.6
Cr 45	NGC 1502			Open cluster	Camelopardalis	6.9
Cr 46	NGC 1513			Open cluster	Perseus	8.4
Cr 47	NGC 1528			Open cluster	Perseus	6.4
Cr 48	IC 361			Open cluster	Camelopardalis	11.7
Cr 49	NGC 1545			Open cluster	Perseus	6.2
Cr 50	-	Hyades		Open cluster	Taurus	0.5
Cr 51	NGC 1582			Open cluster	Perseus	7.0
Cr 52	NGC 1605			Open cluster	Perseus	10.7
Cr 53	NGC 1624			Open cluster	Perseus	11.8
Cr 54	NGC 1647			Open cluster	Taurus	6.4
Cr 55	NGC 1662			Open cluster	Orion	6.4
Cr 56	NGC 1664			Open cluster	Auriga	7.6
Cr 57	NGC 1746			Asterism	Taurus	6.1
Cr 58	NGC 1778			Open cluster	Auriga	7.7
Cr 59	NGC 1807			Open cluster	Orion, Taurus	7.0
Cr 60	NGC 1817			Open cluster	Taurus	7.7
Cr 61	NGC 1857			Open cluster	Auriga	7.0
Cr 62	-			Open cluster	Auriga	4.2
Cr 63	NGC 1893			Open cluster	Auriga	7.5
Cr 64	NGC 1883			Open cluster	Auriga	12.0
Cr 65	-			Open cluster	Taurus	3.0
Cr 66	NGC 1907			Open cluster	Auriga	8.2
Cr 67	NGC 1912			Open cluster	Auriga	6.4
Cr 68	NGC 1931			Open cluster	Auriga	10.1
Cr 69	-	Lambda Orionis Cluster		Open cluster	Orion	2.8
Cr 70	-	Orion's Belt		Open cluster	Orion	0.6
Cr 71	NGC 1960			Open cluster	Auriga	6.0
Cr 72	NGC 1980	Lower Sword		Open cluster	Orion	2.5
Cr 73	NGC 1981	Upper Sword		Open cluster	Orion	4.2
Cr 74	-			Open cluster	Orion	14.4
Cr 75	NGC 2099			Open cluster	Auriga	5.6
Cr 76	NGC 2112			Open cluster	Orion	9.1
Cr 77	NGC 2129			Open cluster	Gemini	6.7
Cr 78	NGC 2126			Open cluster	Auriga	10.2
Cr 79	NGC 2141			Open cluster	Orion	9.4
Cr 80	IC 2157	Trumpler 4		Open cluster	Gemini	8.4
Cr 81	NGC 2158			Open cluster	Gemini	8.6
Cr 82	NGC 2168			Open cluster	Gemini	5.1
Cr 83	NGC 2169	37 Cluster		Open cluster	Orion	5.9
Cr 84	NGC 2175			Open cluster	Orion	6.8
Cr 85	NGC 2186			Open cluster	Orion	8.7
Cr 86	NGC 2192			Open cluster	Auriga	10.9
Cr 87	NGC 2194			Open cluster	Orion	8.5
Cr 88	NGC 2204			Open cluster	Canis Major	8.6
Cr 89	-			Open cluster	Gemini	5.7
Cr 90	NGC 2215			Open cluster	Monoceros	8.4
Cr 91	-			Open cluster	Monoceros	6.4
Cr 92	-			Open cluster	Monoceros	8.6
Cr 93	NGC 2232			Open cluster	Monoceros	4.2
Cr 94	NGC 2236			Open cluster	Monoceros	8.5
Cr 95	-			Open cluster	Monoceros	-
Cr 96	-			Open cluster	Monoceros	7.3
Cr 97	-			Open cluster	Monoceros	5.4
Cr 98	NGC 2243			Open cluster	Canis Major	9.4
Cr 99	NGC 2244	Satellite Cluster		Open cluster	Monoceros	4.8
Cr 100	NGC 2250			Open cluster	Monoceros	8.9
Cr 101	NGC 2251			Open cluster	Monoceros	7.3
Cr 102	NGC 2252			Open cluster	Monoceros	7.7
Cr 103	NGC 2254			Open cluster	Monoceros	9.1
Cr 104	-			Open cluster	Monoceros	9.6
Cr 105	-	Trumpler 5		Open cluster	Monoceros	10.9
Cr 106	-			Open cluster	Monoceros	4.6
Cr 107	-			Open cluster	Monoceros	5.1
Cr 108	NGC 2259			Open cluster	Monoceros	10.8
Cr 109	NGC 2262			Open cluster	Monoceros	11.3
Cr 110	-			Open cluster	Monoceros	10.5
Cr 111	-			Open cluster	Monoceros	7.0
Cr 112	NGC 2264	Christmas Tree Cluster		Open cluster	Monoceros	4.1
Cr 113	NGC 2266			Open cluster	Gemini	9.5
Cr 114	NGC 2269			Open cluster	Monoceros	10.0
Cr 115	-			Open cluster	Monoceros	9.2
Cr 116	NGC 2281			Open cluster	Auriga	5.4
Cr 117	NGC 2286			Open cluster	Monoceros	7.5
Cr 118	NGC 2287			Open cluster	Canis Major	4.5
Cr 119	NGC 2301			Open cluster	Monoceros	6.0
Cr 120	NGC 2304			Open cluster	Gemini	10.0
Cr 121	-			Open cluster	Canis Major	2.6
Cr 122	NGC 2309			Open cluster	Monoceros	10.5
Cr 123	NGC 2311			Open cluster	Monoceros	9.6
Cr 124	NGC 2323			Open cluster	Monoceros	5.9
Cr 125	NGC 2324			Open cluster	Monoceros	8.4
Cr 126	NGC 2331			Open cluster	Gemini	8.5
Cr 127	NGC 2335			Open cluster	Monoceros	7.2
Cr 128	NGC 2343			Open cluster	Monoceros	6.7
Cr 129	NGC 2345			Open cluster	Canis Major	7.7
Cr 130	NGC 2353			Open cluster	Monoceros	7.1
Cr 131	NGC 2354			Open cluster	Canis Major	6.5
Cr 132	-			Open cluster	Canis Major	3.6
Cr 133	NGC 2355			Open cluster	Gemini	9.7
Cr 134	NGC 2360	Caroline's Cluster		Open cluster	Canis Major	7.2
Cr 135	-	Pi Puppis Cluster		Open cluster	Puppis	2.1
Cr 136	NGC 2362	Tau Canis Majoris Cluster		Open cluster	Canis Major	3.8
Cr 137	NGC 2367			Open cluster	Canis Major	7.9
Cr 138	NGC 2368			Open cluster	Monoceros	11.8
Cr 139	NGC 2374			Open cluster	Canis Major	8.0
Cr 140	-			Open cluster	Canis Major	3.5
Cr 141	NGC 2383			Open cluster	Canis Major	8.4
Cr 142	NGC 2384			Open cluster	Canis Major	7.4
Cr 143	NGC 2384			Open cluster	Canis Major	7.4
Cr 144	NGC 2395			Open cluster	Gemini	8.0
Cr 145	-	Trumpler 6		Open cluster	Canis Major	10.0
Cr 146	-	Trumpler 7		Open cluster	Puppis	7.9
Cr 147	-	Melotte 66		Open cluster	Puppis	7.8
Cr 148	NGC 2396			Open cluster	Puppis	7.4
Cr 149	NGC 2401			Open cluster	Puppis	12.6
Cr 150	NGC 2414			Open cluster	Puppis	7.9
Cr 151	NGC 2421			Open cluster	Puppis	8.3
Cr 152	NGC 2422			Open cluster	Puppis	4.4
Cr 153	NGC 2423			Open cluster	Puppis	6.7
Cr 154	NGC 2420			Open cluster	Puppis	8.3
Cr 155	-	Melotte 71		Open cluster	Puppis	7.1
Cr 156	-	Melotte 72		Open cluster	Monoceros	10.1
Cr 157	NGC 2432			Open cluster	Puppis	10.2
Cr 158	NGC 2439			Open cluster	Puppis	6.9
Cr 159	NGC 2437			Open cluster	Puppis	6.1
Cr 160	NGC 2447			Open cluster	Puppis	6.2
Cr 161	NGC 2451			Open cluster	Puppis	2.8
Cr 162	NGC 2453			Open cluster	Puppis	8.3
Cr 163	NGC 2455			Open cluster	Puppis	10.2
Cr 164	NGC 2467			Open cluster	Puppis	7.1
Cr 165	NGC 2477			Open cluster	Puppis	5.8
Cr 166	NGC 2482			Open cluster	Puppis	7.3
Cr 167	NGC 2479	Trumpler 8		Open cluster	Puppis	9.6
Cr 168	-	Trumpler 9		Open cluster	Puppis	8.7
Cr 169	NGC 2489			Open cluster	Puppis	7.9
Cr 170	NGC 2506			Open cluster	Monoceros	7.6
Cr 171	NGC 2509			Open cluster	Puppis	9.3
Cr 172	NGC 2516	Southern Beehive Cluster		Open cluster	Carina	3.8
Cr 173	-			Open cluster	Puppis, Vela	0.6
Cr 174	NGC 2527			Open cluster	Puppis	6.5
Cr 175	NGC 2533			Open cluster	Puppis	7.6
Cr 176	NGC 2539			Open cluster	Puppis	6.5
Cr 177	NGC 2547			Open cluster	Vela	4.7
Cr 178	NGC 2546			Open cluster	Puppis	6.3
Cr 179	NGC 2548			Open cluster	Hydra	5.8
Cr 180	NGC 2567			Open cluster	Puppis	7.4
Cr 181	NGC 2571			Open cluster	Puppis	7.0
Cr 182	NGC 2579			Open cluster	Puppis	7.5
Cr 183	NGC 2580			Open cluster	Puppis	9.7
Cr 184	NGC 2587			Open cluster	Puppis	9.2
Cr 185	-			Open cluster	Puppis	7.8
Cr 186	NGC 2588			Open cluster	Puppis	11.8
Cr 187	-			Open cluster	Puppis	9.6
Cr 188	NGC 2627			Open cluster	Pyxis	8.4
Cr 189	NGC 2632	Beehive Cluster, Praesepe		Open cluster	Cancer	3.1
Cr 190	NGC 2635			Open cluster	Pyxis	11.2
Cr 191	IC 2391	Omicron Velorum Cluster		Open cluster	Vela	2.0
Cr 192	IC 2395			Open cluster	Vela	4.0
Cr 193	NGC 2660			Open cluster	Vela	8.8
Cr 194	NGC 2659			Open cluster	Vela	8.6
Cr 195	NGC 2658			Open cluster	Pyxis	9.2
Cr 196	-			Open cluster	Pyxis	10.5
Cr 197	-			Open cluster	Vela	6.7
Cr 198	-			Open cluster	Pyxis	11.2
Cr 199	NGC 2669			Open cluster	Vela	6.1
Cr 200	NGC 2670			Open cluster	Vela	7.8
Cr 201	NGC 2671			Open cluster	Vela	11.6
Cr 202	NGC 2669	Harvard 3		Open cluster	Vela	6.1
Cr 203	-	Trumpler 10		Open cluster	Vela	5.0
Cr 204	NGC 2682			Open cluster	Cancer	6.9
Cr 205	-	Markarian 18		Open cluster	Vela	7.8
Cr 206	NGC 2818A			Open cluster	Pyxis	8.2
Cr 207	NGC 2849			Open cluster	Vela	12.5
Cr 208	IC 2488			Open cluster	Vela	7.4
Cr 209	NGC 2910			Open cluster	Vela	7.2
Cr 210	NGC 2925			Open cluster	Vela	8.3
Cr 211	NGC 2972			Open cluster	Vela	9.9
Cr 212	NGC 3033			Open cluster	Vela	8.8
Cr 213	-			Open cluster	Vela	9.2
Cr 214	NGC 3105			Open cluster	Vela	9.7
Cr 215	NGC 3114			Open cluster	Carina	4.2
Cr 216	-	Trumpler 11		Open cluster	Carina	8.1
Cr 217	-	Trumpler 12		Open cluster	Carina	8.8
Cr 218	NGC 3228			Open cluster	Vela	6.0
Cr 219	-	Trumpler 13		Open cluster	Carina	11.3
Cr 220	-			Open cluster	Carina	7.6
Cr 221	NGC 3255			Open cluster	Carina	11.0
Cr 222	IC 2581			Open cluster	Carina	4.0
Cr 223	-			Open cluster	Carina	9.4
Cr 224	NGC 3293			Open cluster	Carina	4.7
Cr 225	NGC 3324			Open cluster	Carina	6.7
Cr 226	NGC 3330			Open cluster	Vela	7.4
Cr 227	-	Melotte 101		Open cluster	Carina	8.0
Cr 228	-			Open cluster	Carina	4.4
Cr 229	IC 2602	Theta Carinae Cluster, Southern Pleiades		Open cluster	Carina	1.0
Cr 230	-	Trumpler 14		Open cluster	Carina	5.5
Cr 231	-	Trumpler 15		Open cluster	Carina	7.0
Cr 232	-			Open cluster	Carina	6.8
Cr 233	-	Trumpler 16		Open cluster	Carina	5.0
Cr 234	-	(Note: Includes only the southern portion of Trumpler 16.)		Open cluster	Carina	5.0
Cr 235	-	Trumpler 17		Open cluster	Carina	8.4
Cr 236	-			Open cluster	Carina	7.7
Cr 237	NGC 3496			Open cluster	Carina	8.2
Cr 238	NGC 3532	Wishing Well Cluster		Open cluster	Carina	3.0
Cr 239	NGC 3572			Open cluster	Carina	6.6
Cr 240	-			Open cluster	Carina	3.9
Cr 241	-	Trumpler 18		Open cluster	Carina	6.9
Cr 242	NGC 3590			Open cluster	Carina	8.2
Cr 243	-	Trumpler 19		Open cluster	Carina	9.6
Cr 244	NGC 3603			Open cluster	Carina	9.1
Cr 245	IC 2714			Open cluster	Carina	8.0
Cr 246	-	Melotte 105		Open cluster	Carina	8.5
Cr 247	NGC 3680			Open cluster	Carina	7.6
Cr 248	NGC 3766	Pearl Cluster		Open cluster	Centaurus	5.3
Cr 249	-			Open cluster	Centaurus	4.0
Cr 250	NGC 3960			Open cluster	Centaurus	8.3
Cr 251	NGC 4052			Open cluster	Crux	8.8
Cr 252	NGC 4103			Open cluster	Crux	7.4
Cr 253	NGC 4230			Open cluster	Centaurus	9.4
Cr 254	NGC 4337			Open cluster	Crux	8.9
Cr 255	NGC 4349			Open cluster	Crux	7.4
Cr 256	-	Coma Star Cluster		Open cluster	Coma Berenices	1.8
Cr 257	-			Open cluster	Crux	-
Cr 258	-			Open cluster	Crux	7.1
Cr 259	NGC 4439			Open cluster	Crux	8.4
Cr 260	NGC 4463			Open cluster	Musca	7.2
Cr 261	-			Open cluster	Musca	10.7
Cr 262	-	Trumpler 20		Open cluster	Crux	10.1
Cr 263	NGC 4609			Open cluster	Crux	6.9
Cr 264	NGC 4755	Jewel Box		Open cluster	Crux	4.2
Cr 265	NGC 4815			Open cluster	Musca	8.6
Cr 266	NGC 4852			Open cluster	Centaurus	8.9
Cr 267	NGC 5053			Globular cluster	Coma Berenices	9.0
Cr 268	-			Open cluster	Musca	9.5
Cr 269	-			Open cluster	Musca	9.2
Cr 270	NGC 5138			Open cluster	Centaurus	7.6
Cr 271	-			Open cluster	Centaurus	8.7
Cr 272	-			Open cluster	Centaurus	7.7
Cr 273	NGC 5168			Open cluster	Centaurus	9.1
Cr 274	-	Trumpler 21		Open cluster	Centaurus	7.7
Cr 275	-			Open cluster	Centaurus	10.2
Cr 276	NGC 5281			Open cluster	Centaurus	5.9
Cr 277	-			Open cluster	Circinus	9.2
Cr 278	NGC 5288			Open cluster	Circinus	11.8
Cr 279	NGC 5316			Open cluster	Centaurus	6.0
Cr 280	NGC 5460			Open cluster	Centaurus	5.6
Cr 281	NGC 5606			Open cluster	Centaurus	7.7
Cr 282	NGC 5617			Open cluster	Centaurus	6.3
Cr 283	-	Trumpler 22		Open cluster	Centaurus	7.9
Cr 284	NGC 5662			Open cluster	Centaurus	5.5
Cr 285	-	Ursa Major Moving Group		Moving group	Ursa Major	4.4
Cr 286	NGC 5715			Open cluster	Circinus	9.8
Cr 287	NGC 5749			Open cluster	Lupus	8.8
Cr 288	NGC 5764			Open cluster	Lupus	12.6
Cr 289	NGC 5822			Open cluster	Lupus	6.5
Cr 290	NGC 5823			Open cluster	Circinus	7.9
Cr 291	NGC 5925			Open cluster	Norma	8.4
Cr 292	-			Open cluster	Norma	7.9
Cr 293	NGC 5999			Open cluster	Norma	9.0
Cr 294	NGC 6005			Open cluster	Norma	10.7
Cr 295	-	Trumpler 23		Open cluster	Norma	11.2
Cr 296	NGC 6025			Open cluster	Triangulum Australe	5.1
Cr 297	NGC 6031			Open cluster	Norma	8.5
Cr 298	NGC 6067			Open cluster	Norma	5.6
Cr 299	-	Harvard 10		Open cluster	Norma	6.9
Cr 300	NGC 6087	S Normae Cluster		Open cluster	Norma	5.4
Cr 301	NGC 6124			Open cluster	Scorpius	5.8
Cr 302	-	Upper Scorpius association		Stellar association	Scorpius	1.0
Cr 303	NGC 6134			Open cluster	Norma	7.2
Cr 304	NGC 6152			Open cluster	Norma	8.1
Cr 305	NGC 6167			Open cluster	Norma	6.7
Cr 306	NGC 6169			Open cluster	Norma	6.6
Cr 307	-			Open cluster	Norma	9.2
Cr 308	NGC 6178			Open cluster	Scorpius	7.2
Cr 309	NGC 6192			Open cluster	Scorpius	8.5
Cr 310	NGC 6193			Open cluster	Ara	5.2
Cr 311	NGC 6200			Open cluster	Ara	7.4
Cr 312	NGC 6204			Open cluster	Ara	8.2
Cr 313	NGC 6208			Open cluster	Ara	7.2
Cr 314	NGC 6222			Open cluster	Scorpius	10.1
Cr 315	NGC 6231			Open cluster	Scorpius	2.6
Cr 316	-	(Note: Superposed on Trumpler 24.)		Open cluster	Scorpius	6.6
Cr 317	NGC 6242			Open cluster	Scorpius	6.4
Cr 318	-	Trumpler 24		Open cluster	Scorpius	8.6
Cr 319	NGC 6249			Open cluster	Scorpius	8.2
Cr 320	NGC 6250			Open cluster	Ara	5.9
Cr 321	NGC 6253			Open cluster	Ara	10.2
Cr 322	NGC 6259			Open cluster	Scorpius	8.0
Cr 323	NGC 6268			Open cluster	Scorpius	9.5
Cr 324	NGC 6281			Open cluster	Scorpius	5.4
Cr 325	NGC 6318			Open cluster	Scorpius	11.8
Cr 326	NGC 6322			Open cluster	Scorpius	6.0
Cr 327	IC 4651			Open cluster	Ara	6.9
Cr 328	NGC 6352			Globular cluster	Ara	7.8
Cr 329	-	Trumpler 25		Open cluster	Scorpius	11.7
Cr 330	NGC 6355			Globular cluster	Ophiuchus	8.6
Cr 331	-	Trumpler 26		Open cluster	Ophiuchus	9.5
Cr 332	-			Open cluster	Scorpius	8.9
Cr 333	-			Open cluster	Scorpius	9.8
Cr 334	NGC 6374			Open cluster	Scorpius	5.5
Cr 335	NGC 6383			Open cluster	Scorpius	5.5
Cr 336	-	Trumpler 27		Open cluster	Scorpius	6.7
Cr 337	-	Trumpler 28		Open cluster	Scorpius	7.7
Cr 338	-			Open cluster	Scorpius	8.0
Cr 339	NGC 6396			Open cluster	Scorpius	8.5
Cr 340	NGC 6404			Open cluster	Scorpius	10.6
Cr 341	NGC 6405	Butterfly Cluster		Open cluster	Scorpius	4.2
Cr 342	NGC 6400			Open cluster	Scorpius	8.8
Cr 343	-	Trumpler 29		Open cluster	Scorpius	7.5
Cr 344	NGC 6416			Open cluster	Scorpius	5.7
Cr 345	-			Open cluster	Scorpius	10.9
Cr 346	NGC 6426			Globular cluster	Ophiuchus	10.9
Cr 347	-			Open cluster	Ophiuchus	8.8
Cr 348	NGC 6425			Open cluster	Scorpius	7.2
Cr 349	IC 4665			Open cluster	Ophiuchus	4.2
Cr 350	-			Open cluster	Ophiuchus	6.1
Cr 351	-			Open cluster	Sagittarius	9.3
Cr 352	NGC 6451			Open cluster	Scorpius	8.2
Cr 353	NGC 6469			Open cluster	Sagittarius	8.2
Cr 354	NGC 6475	Ptolemy Cluster		Open cluster	Scorpius	3.3
Cr 355	-	Trumpler 30		Open cluster	Scorpius	8.8
Cr 356	NGC 6494			Open cluster	Sagittarius	5.5
Cr 357	-	Trumpler 31		Open cluster	Sagittarius	9.8
Cr 358	NGC 6507			Open cluster	Sagittarius	9.6
Cr 359	-	Melotte 186		Open cluster	Ophiuchus	3.0
Cr 360	NGC 6514	Trifid Nebula		Open cluster	Sagittarius	6.3
Cr 361	NGC 6520			Open cluster	Sagittarius	7.6
Cr 362	NGC 6530			Open cluster	Sagittarius	4.6
Cr 363	NGC 6531			Open cluster	Sagittarius	5.9
Cr 364	NGC 6540			Globular cluster	Sagittarius	9.3
Cr 365	NGC 6546			Open cluster	Sagittarius	8.0
Cr 366	NGC 6544			Globular cluster	Sagittarius	7.5
Cr 367	-			Open cluster	Sagittarius	6.4
Cr 368	NGC 6558			Globular cluster	Sagittarius	8.6
Cr 369	NGC 6568			Open cluster	Sagittarius	8.6
Cr 370	NGC 6583			Open cluster	Sagittarius	10.0
Cr 371	NGC 6595			Open cluster	Sagittarius	7.0
Cr 372	-	Trumpler 32		Open cluster	Serpens	12.2
Cr 373	NGC 6604			Open cluster	Serpens	6.5
Cr 374	NGC 6603	(Note: Embedded within Messier 24.)		Open cluster	Sagittarius	11.1
Cr 375	NGC 6611	Eagle Nebula		Open cluster	Serpens	6.0
Cr 376	NGC 6613			Open cluster	Sagittarius	6.9
Cr 377	NGC 6618	(Note: Associated with Messier 17.)		Open cluster	Sagittarius	6.0
Cr 378	-	Trumpler 33		Open cluster	Sagittarius	7.8
Cr 379	NGC 6631			Open cluster	Scutum	11.7
Cr 380	NGC 6633			Open cluster	Ophiuchus	4.6
Cr 381	NGC 6642			Globular cluster	Sagittarius	8.9
Cr 382	IC 4725			Open cluster	Sagittarius	4.6
Cr 383	NGC 6645			Open cluster	Sagittarius	8.5
Cr 384	NGC 6649			Open cluster	Scutum	8.9
Cr 385	NGC 6664			Open cluster	Scutum	7.8
Cr 386	IC 4756			Open cluster	Serpens	4.6
Cr 387	-	Trumpler 34		Open cluster	Scutum	8.6
Cr 388	-	Trumpler 35		Open cluster	Scutum	9.2
Cr 389	NGC 6694			Open cluster	Scutum	8.0
Cr 390	NGC 6704			Open cluster	Scutum	9.2
Cr 391	NGC 6705	Wild Duck Cluster		Open cluster	Scutum	5.8
Cr 392	NGC 6709			Open cluster	Aquila	6.7
Cr 393	NGC 6716			Open cluster	Sagittarius	7.5
Cr 394	-			Open cluster	Sagittarius	6.3
Cr 395	NGC 6717			Globular cluster	Sagittarius	8.4
Cr 396	NGC 6738			Asterism	Aquila	8.3
Cr 397	NGC 6755			Open cluster	Aquila	7.5
Cr 398	NGC 6756			Open cluster	Aquila	10.6
Cr 399	-	Al Sufi's Cluster, Brocchi's Cluster, Coathanger		Asterism	Vulpecula	3.6
Cr 400	NGC 6802			Open cluster	Vulpecula	8.8
Cr 401	-			Open cluster	Aquila	7.0
Cr 402	NGC 6811			Open cluster	Cygnus	6.8
Cr 403	NGC 6819			Open cluster	Cygnus	7.3
Cr 404	NGC 6820	(Note: Associated with NGC 6820.)		Open cluster	Vulpecula	14.9
Cr 405	NGC 6823			Open cluster	Vulpecula	7.1
Cr 406	NGC 6830			Open cluster	Vulpecula	7.9
Cr 407	NGC 6834			Open cluster	Cygnus	7.8
Cr 408	-	Harvard 20		Open cluster	Sagitta	7.7
Cr 409	NGC 6838			Globular cluster	Sagitta	8.4
Cr 410	NGC 6846			Open cluster	Cygnus	14.2
Cr 411	-	Melotte 227		Open cluster	Octans	5.3
Cr 412	NGC 6866			Open cluster	Cygnus	7.6
Cr 413	NGC 6871			Open cluster	Cygnus	5.2
Cr 414	IC 1311			Globular cluster	Cygnus	13.1
Cr 415	NGC 6883			Open cluster	Cygnus	8.0
Cr 416	NGC 6882			Open cluster	Vulpecula	8.1
Cr 417	NGC 6885			Open cluster	Vulpecula	8.1
Cr 418	IC 4996			Open cluster	Cygnus	7.3
Cr 419	-			Open cluster	Cygnus	7.6
Cr 420	NGC 6910			Open cluster	Cygnus	7.4
Cr 421	-			Open cluster	Cygnus	10.1
Cr 422	NGC 6913			Open cluster	Cygnus	6.6
Cr 423	NGC 6939			Open cluster	Cepheus	7.8
Cr 424	NGC 6940			Open cluster	Vulpecula	6.3
Cr 425	NGC 6996			Open cluster	Cygnus	10.0
Cr 426	NGC 6994			Asterism	Aquarius	8.9
Cr 427	-			Open cluster	Cepheus	13.8
Cr 428	-			Open cluster	Cygnus	8.7
Cr 429	NGC 7023	(Note: Embedded within the Iris Nebula.)		Open cluster	Cepheus	7.4
Cr 430	NGC 7031			Open cluster	Cygnus	9.1
Cr 431	NGC 7039			Open cluster	Cygnus	7.6
Cr 432	IC 1369			Open cluster	Cygnus	8.8
Cr 433	NGC 7044			Open cluster	Cygnus	12.0
Cr 434	NGC 7062			Open cluster	Cygnus	8.3
Cr 435	NGC 7063			Open cluster	Cygnus	7.0
Cr 436	NGC 7067			Open cluster	Cygnus	9.7
Cr 437	NGC 7086			Open cluster	Cygnus	8.4
Cr 438	NGC 7092			Open cluster	Cygnus	4.6
Cr 439	IC 1396	Elephant's Trunk Nebula		Open cluster	Cepheus	3.5
Cr 440	NGC 7128			Open cluster	Cygnus	9.7
Cr 441	NGC 7129			Open cluster	Cepheus	11.5
Cr 442	NGC 7142			Open cluster	Cepheus	9.3
Cr 443	NGC 7160			Open cluster	Cepheus	6.1
Cr 444	NGC 7209			Open cluster	Lacerta	7.7
Cr 445	IC 1434			Open cluster	Lacerta	9.0
Cr 446	NGC 7226			Open cluster	Cepheus	9.6
Cr 447	NGC 7235			Open cluster	Cepheus	7.7
Cr 448	NGC 7243			Open cluster	Lacerta	6.4
Cr 449	NGC 7245			Open cluster	Lacerta	9.2
Cr 450	NGC 7261			Open cluster	Cepheus	8.4
Cr 451	NGC 7296			Open cluster	Lacerta	9.7
Cr 452	NGC 7380			Open cluster	Cepheus	7.2
Cr 453	NGC 7419			Open cluster	Cepheus	13.0
Cr 454	NGC 7510			Open cluster	Cepheus	7.9
Cr 455	NGC 7654			Open cluster	Cassiopeia	6.9
Cr 456	NGC 7686			Open cluster	Andromeda	5.6
Cr 457	NGC 7762			Open cluster	Cepheus	10.0
Cr 458	-	Harvard 21		Open cluster	Cassiopeia	9.0
Cr 459	NGC 7788			Open cluster	Cassiopeia	9.4
Cr 460	NGC 7789	Caroline's Rose Cluster		Open cluster	Cassiopeia	6.7
Cr 461	NGC 7790			Open cluster	Cassiopeia	8.5
Cr 462	NGC 189			Open cluster	Cassiopeia	8.8
Cr 463	-			Open cluster	Cassiopeia	5.7
Cr 464	-			Open cluster	Camelopardalis	4.2
Cr 465	-			Open cluster	Monoceros	10.1
Cr 466	-			Open cluster	Monoceros	11.1
Cr 467	-			Open cluster	Monoceros	10.1
Cr 468	-			Open cluster	Sagittarius	11.0
Cr 469	-			Open cluster	Sagittarius	9.1
Cr 470	IC 5146			Open cluster	Cygnus	7.2
Cr 471	-			Open cluster	Cepheus	-

== Errors ==
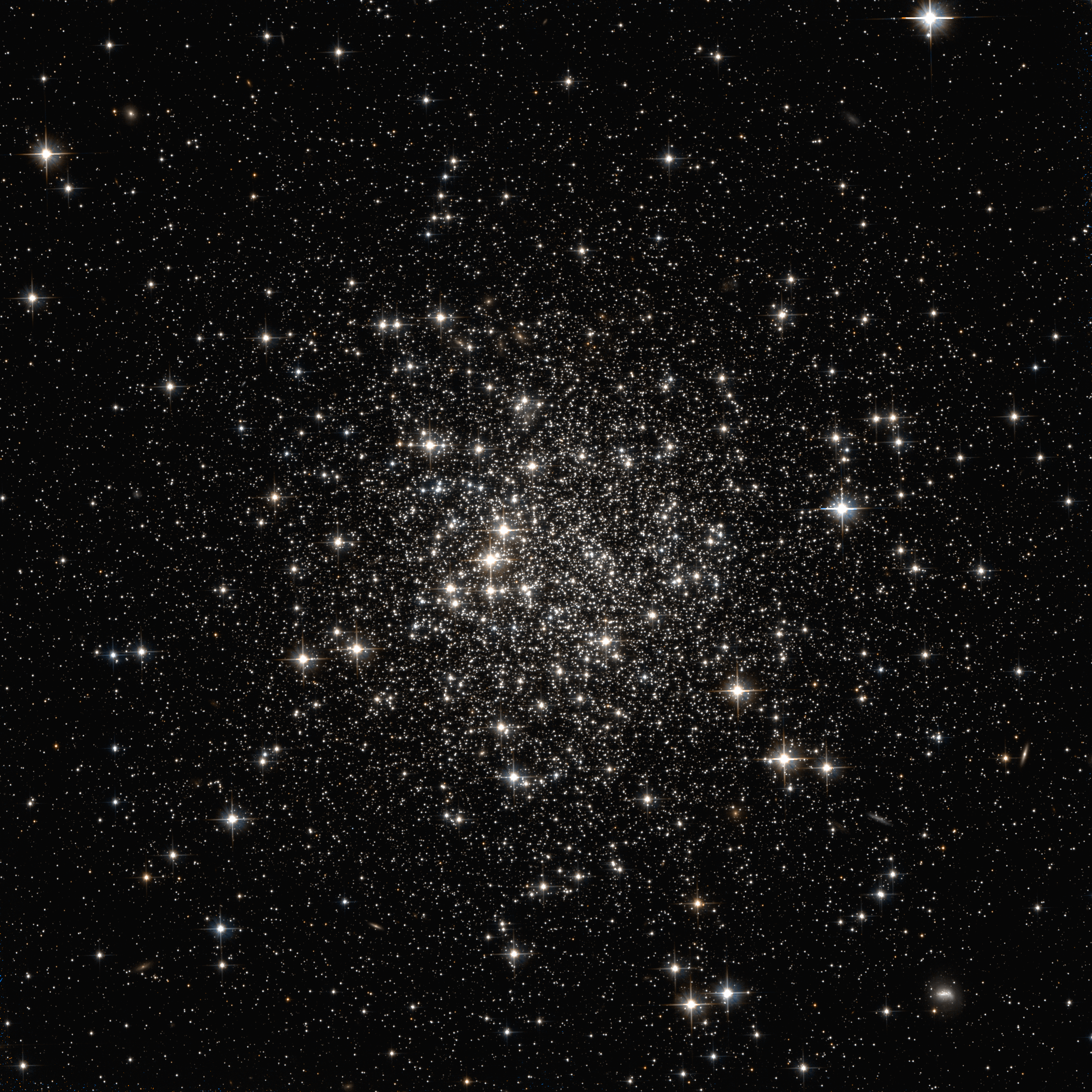
Collinder 346 was misidentified as an open cluster when it is actually a globular cluster.

There are some errors in Collinder's list or references to it. For example:

- Cr 21, 27, 57, 396, 399, and 426 are asterisms.
- Cr 32, 33, and 34 all refer to parts of the much larger IC 1848.
- There is some doubt as to whether or not Cr 84, 182, 221, 254, 265, 269, 283, 294, 336, 387, 404, 425, 456, and 458 are open clusters.
- The positions of Cr 109 and 185 are inaccurate.
- Cr 202 is actually the central condensation of the much larger Cr 199.
- Cr 220 was believed by Collinder to be NGC 3247 when in reality he had discovered a new open cluster.
- Cr 234 was applied to the southern section of the much larger Cr 233.
- Cr 240 is actually the central condensation of the much larger Cr 239.
- Cr 267, 328, 330, 346, 364, 366, 368, 381, 395, 409, and 414 are globular clusters.
- Cr 334 and 335 are duplicate listings of the same object.
- The original alias given for Cr 339 is the galaxy NGC 6393. The correct alias for Cr 339 is the open cluster NGC 6396.
- The original alias given for Cr 371 is of the nebula which surrounds an open cluster he discovered. He apparently did not know he was first to make the distinction.
- Cr 374 is embedded within the much larger Messier 24.
- Collinder erroneously believed that Messier 11 was a globular cluster.
- Collinder’s description of Messier 73 is actually for Messier 72, a globular cluster, and not the object he intended for, Cr. 426.

== See also ==
- List of astronomical catalogues
- Melotte catalogue - a similar catalogue of star clusters published by Philibert Jacques Melotte in 1915.
- Trumpler catalogue - a similar catalogue of open star clusters published by Robert Julius Trumpler in 1930, one year before Per Collinder.
