= NGC 381 =

Open cluster in the constellation Cassiopeia

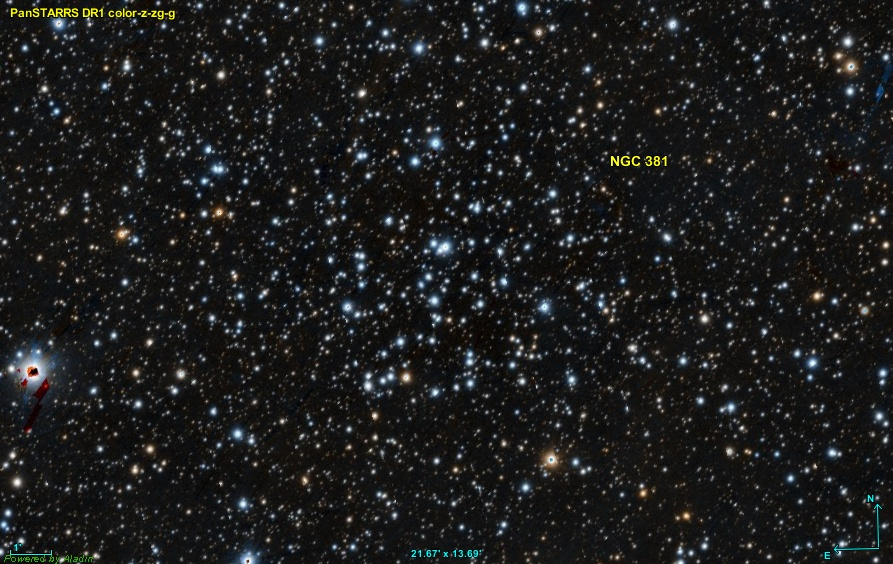

Observation data (J2000 epoch)
- Right ascension: 01^{h} 08^{m} 19.9^{s}
- Declination: +61° 35′ 02″
- Distance: 3,120 ± 300 ly (957 ± 93 pc)
- Apparent magnitude (V): 9.3
- Apparent dimensions (V): 6′ or 7′

Physical characteristics
- Mass: 32.4+45.2 −18.9 M_{☉}
- Radius: 15 ly
- Estimated age: 316+39 −34
- Other designations: Collinder 10

Associations
- Constellation: Cassiopeia

NGC 381 is an open cluster of stars in the northern constellation of Cassiopeia, located at a distance of approximately 3,120 light-years from the Sun. Credit for the discovery of this cluster was given to Caroline Herschel by her brother William in 1787, although she may never have actually seen it.

This is a Trumpler class III 1 m cluster of intermediate age, estimated at 316 million years. This class indicates the cluster is relatively weakly concentrated, with a small brightness range and an intermediate richness of stars. A total of 350 probable members have been identified, down to 20th magnitude, and the cluster contains about 32 times the mass of the Sun. The cluster has a core angular radius of 2.99′±0.93′ and an outer cluster radius of 5.6′±0.1′. It has a physical tidal radius of 15 ly (4.7 pc). No giant stars have been discovered in this cluster. Four candidate variable stars have been found in the field of NGC 381; one of which is a suspected cluster member. The eclipsing binary OX Cassiopeiae was once thought to be a member, but is now known to be a background star system.
