= NGC 366 =

Open cluster in the constellation Cassiopeia

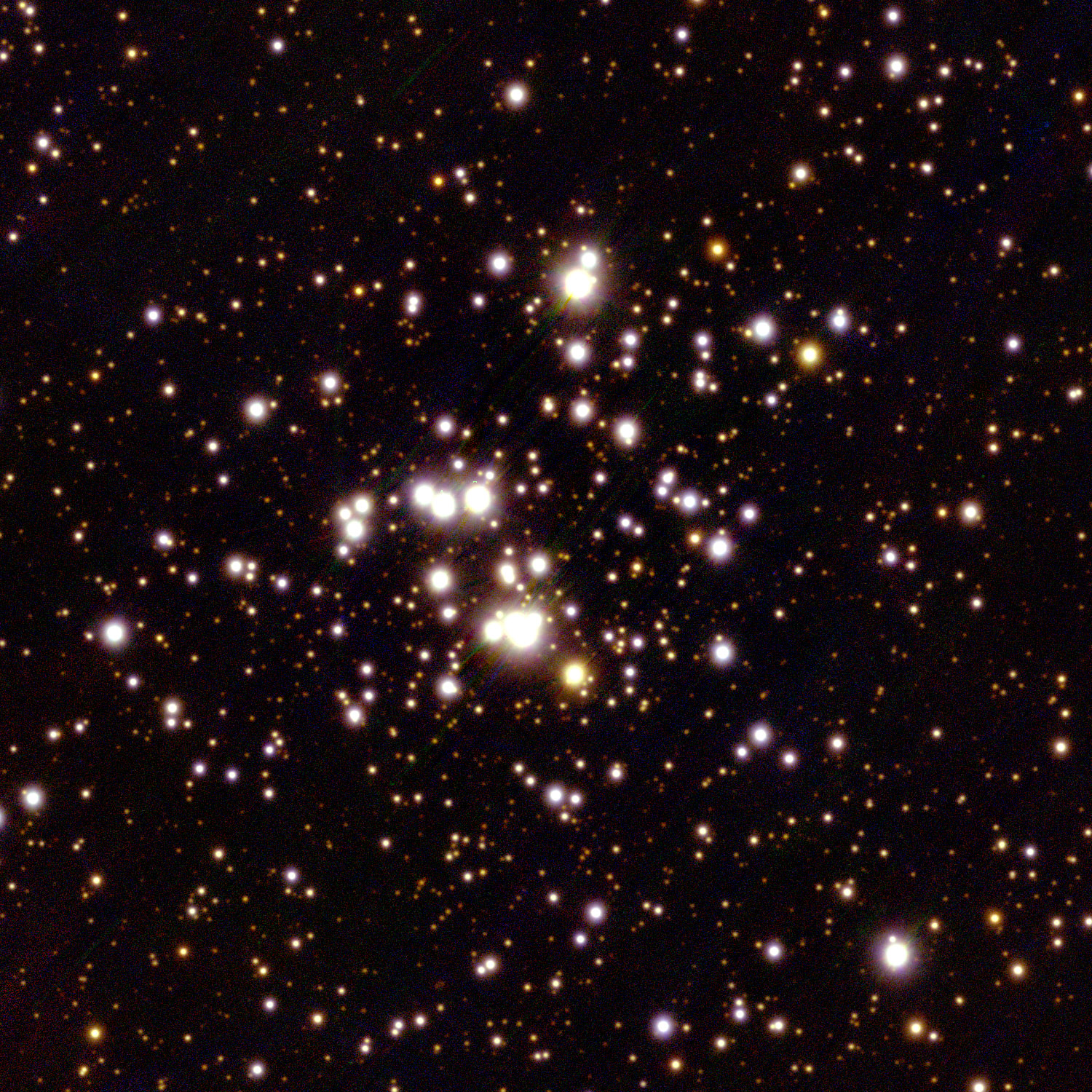
- PanSTARRS image of NGC 366

Observation data (J2000 epoch)
- Right ascension: 01^{h} 06^{m} 26.0^{s}
- Declination: +62° 13′ 44″
- Distance: 7.83-8.81 kly (2.4-2.7 kpc)

Physical characteristics
- Other designations: Cr 9, GC 195, h 83, OCL 316

Associations
- Constellation: Cassiopeia

NGC 366 is an open cluster located in the constellation Cassiopeia. It was discovered on October 27, 1829, by John Herschel. It was described by Dreyer as a "cluster, small."

== See also ==
- Open cluster
- List of NGC objects (1–1000)
- Cassiopeia (constellation)
