= NGC 6540 =

Globular cluster in the constellation Sagittarius

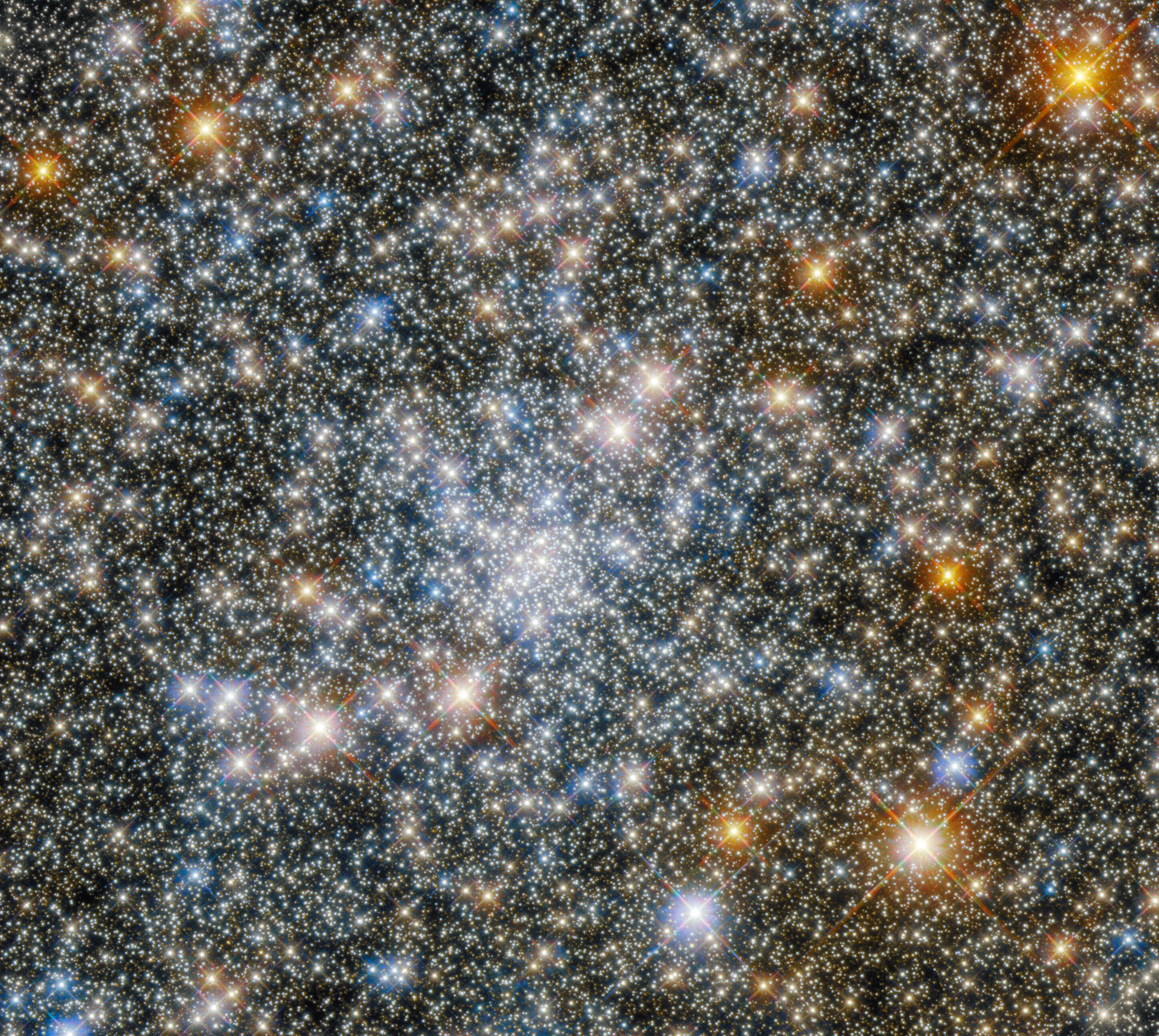
- Hubble Space Telescope image of NGC 6540

Observation data (J2000 epoch)
- Constellation: Sagittarius
- Right ascension: 18^{h} 06^{m} 08.60^{s}
- Declination: −27° 45′ 55.0″
- Distance: 12.07 ± 0.98 kly (3.7 ± 0.3 kpc)
- Apparent magnitude (V): 9.30

Physical characteristics
- Absolute magnitude: −5.38
- Radius: 4.75′ × 4.75′
- Metallicity: [Fe/H] = −1.20 dex
- Other designations: C 1803-278, NGC 6540, Cr 364

NGC 6540 is a globular cluster of stars in the souther constellation Sagittarius, positioned about 4.66° away from the Galactic Center. It was discovered by German-British astronomer Wilhelm Herschel on May 24, 1784, with an 18.7-inch mirror telescope, who described the cluster as "pretty faint, not large, crookedly extended, easily resolvable". It has an apparent visual magnitude of 9.3 with an angular diameter of about 9.5 arcminutes.

The cluster is located at a distance of 12 kly (3.7 kpc) from the Sun, and 14 kly (4.4 kpc) from the Galactic Center. It was originally thought to be an open cluster before being designated a globular. The cluster includes a peculiar X-ray source of uncertain type.
