= NGC 7063 =

Open cluster in the constellation Cygnus

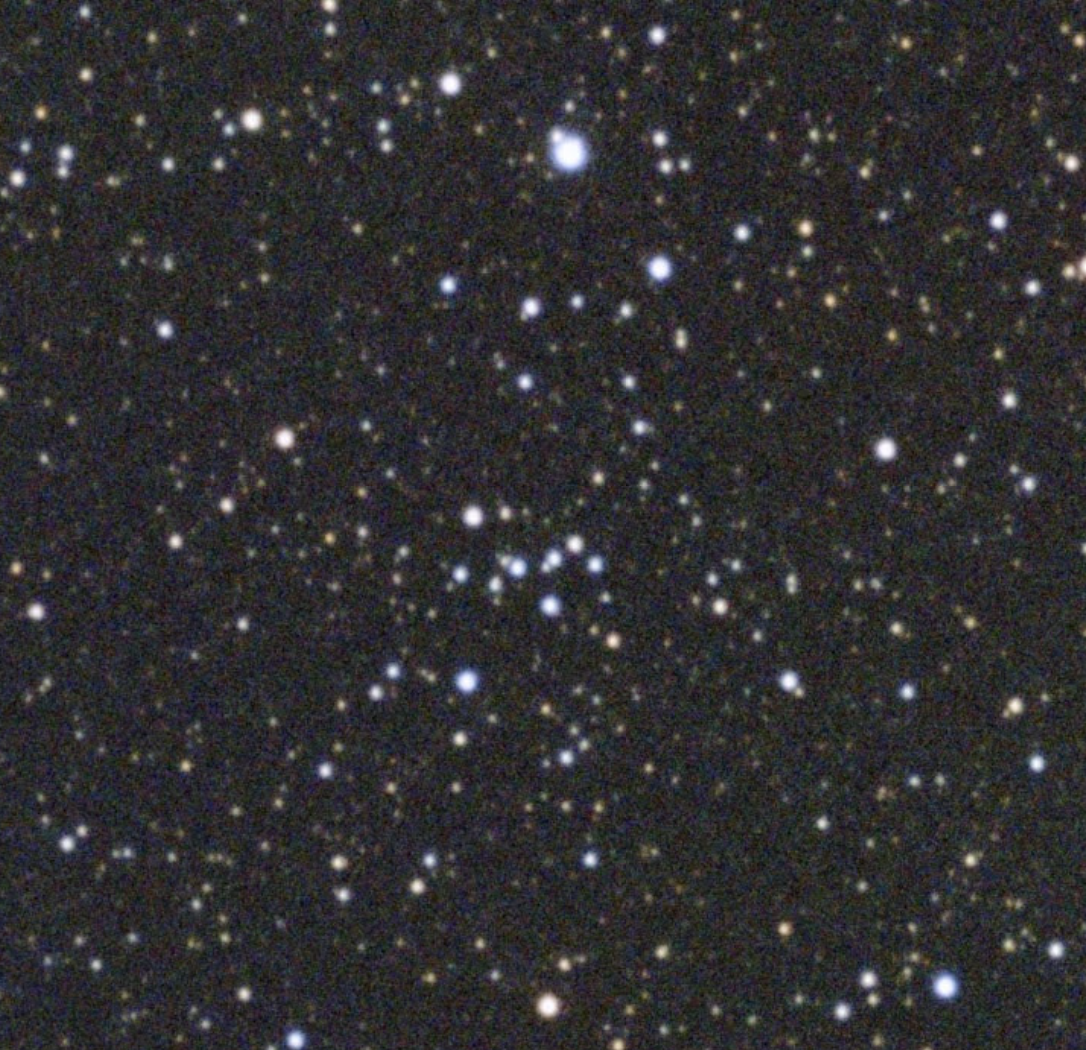
- NGC 7063 imaged in 2026

Observation data
- Right ascension: 21^{h} 24^{m} 22^{s}
- Declination: +36° 29′ 12″
- Distance: 2,200 LY
- Apparent magnitude (V): 7.32
- Apparent dimensions (V): 6.3' x 6.3'ref name='Live'/>

Physical characteristics
- Other designations: OCL 205

Associations
- Constellation: Cygnus

NGC 7063 is an open cluster in Cygnus. It was discovered on August 19, 1828, by John Herschel. It is located near to the star 69 Cygni.

The cluster was first studied in 1931 by Per Collinder, who believed the cluster to have only 10 to 12 stars. The distance was determined in 1961. In 2021, it was discovered that the cluster contained 75 stars.
