= NGC 956 =

Asterism in the constellation Andromeda

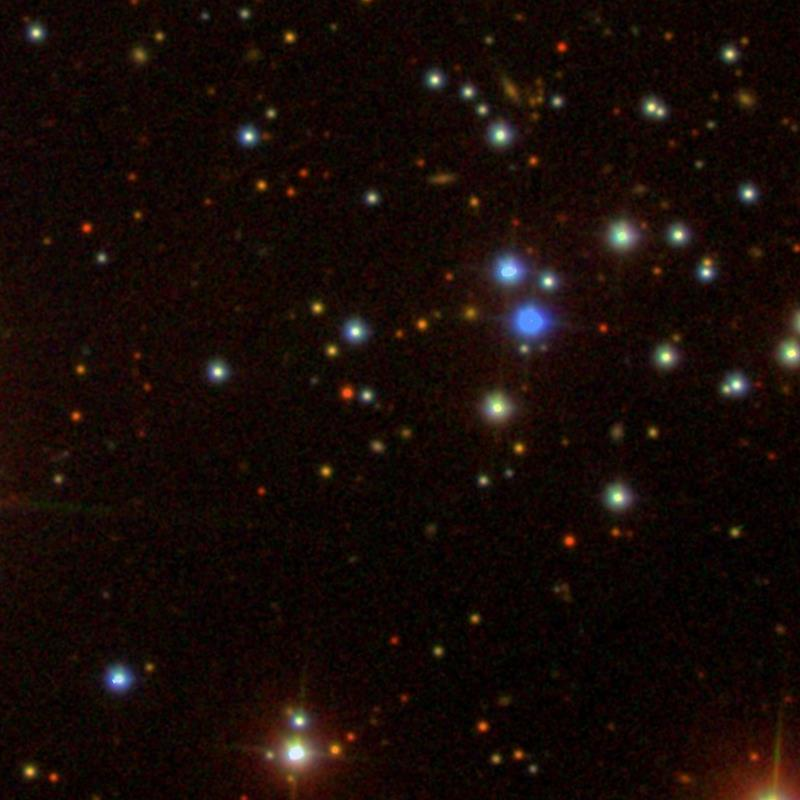

Observation data (J2000 epoch)
- Right ascension: 02^{h} 32^{m} 15.0^{s}
- Declination: +44° 33′ 48″
- Apparent magnitude (V): 8.9
- Apparent dimensions (V): 9′

Physical characteristics
- Chance alignment
- Other designations: Cr 27

Associations
- Constellation: Andromeda

NGC 956 is an asterism in the constellation Andromeda.

The pattern of stars was found on December 23, 1831, by the British astronomer John Herschel, who originally believed the object to be an open cluster. However, an analysis in 2008 led to the conclusion that this "object" was merely a chance alignment of stars that only appear to be an open cluster.
