= NGC 2374 =

Open cluster in the constellation Canis Major

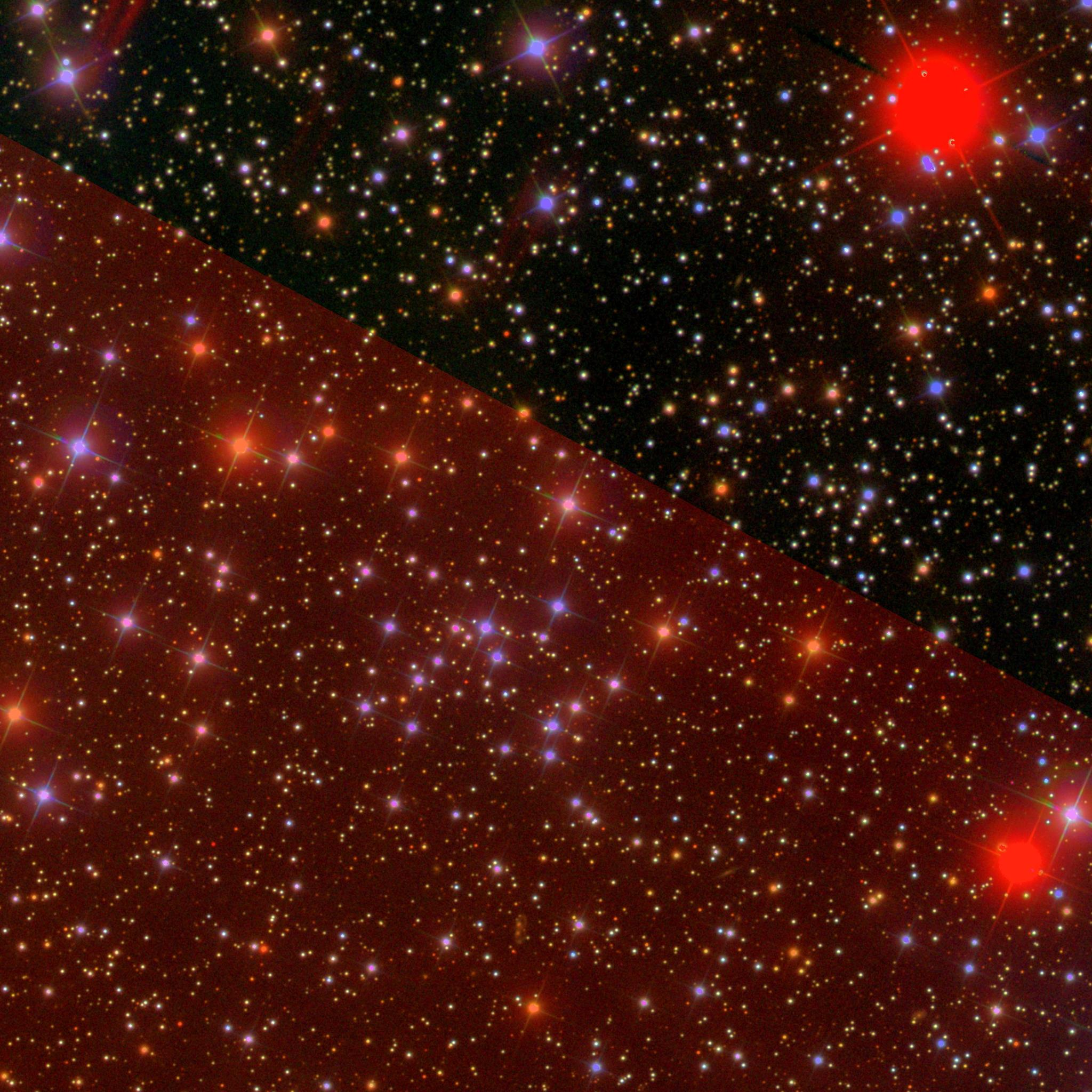

Observation data (J2000.0 epoch)
- Right ascension: 07^{h} 24^{m} 03.8^{s}
- Declination: −13° 14′ 06″
- Distance: 3,950 ly (1,212 pc)
- Apparent magnitude (V): 8.0
- Apparent dimensions (V): 19.0′

Physical characteristics
- Other designations: NGC 2374, Cr 139

Associations
- Constellation: Canis Major

NGC 2374 is an open cluster of stars in the constellation Canis Major. It was discovered on January 31, 1785 by the German-British astronomer William Herschel. This cluster is relatively rich in stars but is scattered across an angular diameter of 19.0′. It has an integrated visual magnitude of 8.0 and can be viewed with a modest amateur telescope. NGC 2374 is located at a distance of approximately 3,950 light-years (1,212 pc) from the Sun.

This association has a Trumpler class of II 3p, which means it is composed of both bright and faint stars (3) with little central concentration (II) and is sparsely populated with under 50 stars (p). The cluster has a core radius of 6.4 ± 2.4 ly (1.95 ± 0.74 pc) and a tidal radius of 85 ± 31 ly (26.00 ± 9.57 pc). The estimated age of the cluster is around 75 million years. At least 20 stars of magnitude 14 or greater have been identified as probable members. Two candidate blue stragglers have been identified. The distance to this cluster places it in the Orion Arm of the Milky Way.
