= NGC 146 =

Open cluster in the constellation Cassiopeia

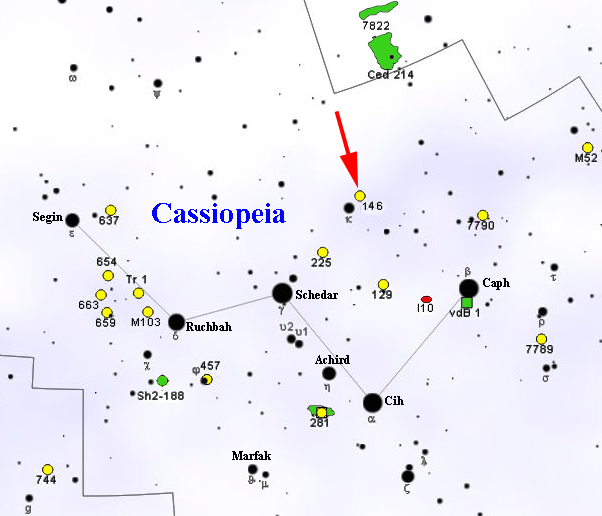
- Location of NGC 146

Observation data (J2000 epoch)
- Right ascension: 00^{h} 33^{m} 03.9^{s}
- Declination: +63° 18′ 32″
- Distance: 9.7 ± 1.1 kly (2.98 ± 0.33 kpc)
- Apparent magnitude (V): 9.1

Physical characteristics
- Estimated age: 20 Myr
- Other designations: Cr 5, OCl 299, C 0030+630

Associations
- Constellation: Cassiopeia

NGC 146 is a small open cluster in the constellation Cassiopeia. It was discovered by John Herschel in 1829 using his father's 18.7 inch reflecting telescope.

== Location ==
κ Cassiopeiae, NGC 146 and NGC 133 in optical light

NGC 146 is fairly easy to locate in the sky, being half a degree away from the bright star Kappa Cassiopeiae. However, spotting the cluster itself is difficult because of its low apparent magnitude of 9.1. Its relatively high declination of about 63° means it is not visible for below 27° S. Its distance is estimated at about 3,000 parsecs (10,000 light years) away.

NGC 146 is close to the open cluster King 14, both being located in the Perseus Arm. The two clusters follow similar circular orbits throughout the Milky Way's thin disk, orbiting at a distance of 9,000 parsecs (29,000 light-years) from the Galactic Center with an orbital period of about 255 million years. The two likely originated from the same giant molecular cloud but are not gravitationally bound to each other.

== Characteristics ==
The cluster is fairly young, as there are numerous B-type and A-type main sequence stars and pre-main-sequence stars but relatively few evolved supergiants. Among its most massive stars are two Herbig Be stars.
