= NGC 3228 =

Open cluster in the constellation Vela

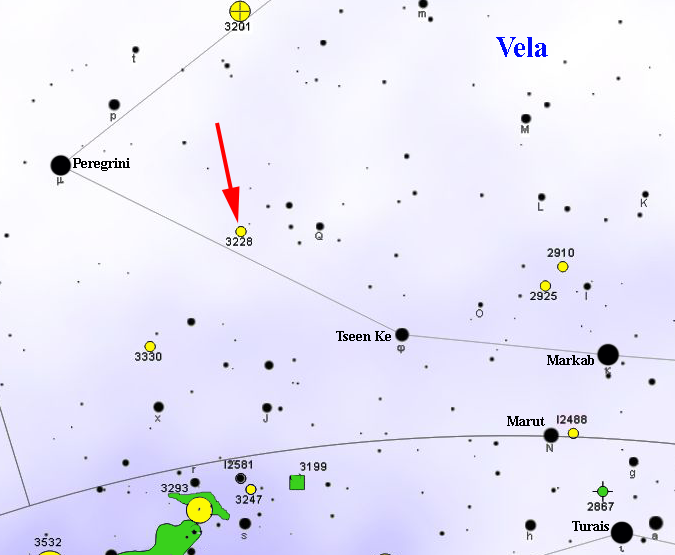
- Location of NGC 3228 NGC 3228 DSS.jpg

Observation data (J2000 epoch)
- Right ascension: 10^{h} 21^{m} 22^{s}
- Declination: −51° 43′ 42″
- Distance: 1,870 ly (573 pc)
- Apparent magnitude (V): 6.0
- Apparent dimensions (V): 11'

Physical characteristics
- Estimated age: 260 million years
- Other designations: Collinder 218, vdBH 93

Associations
- Constellation: Vela

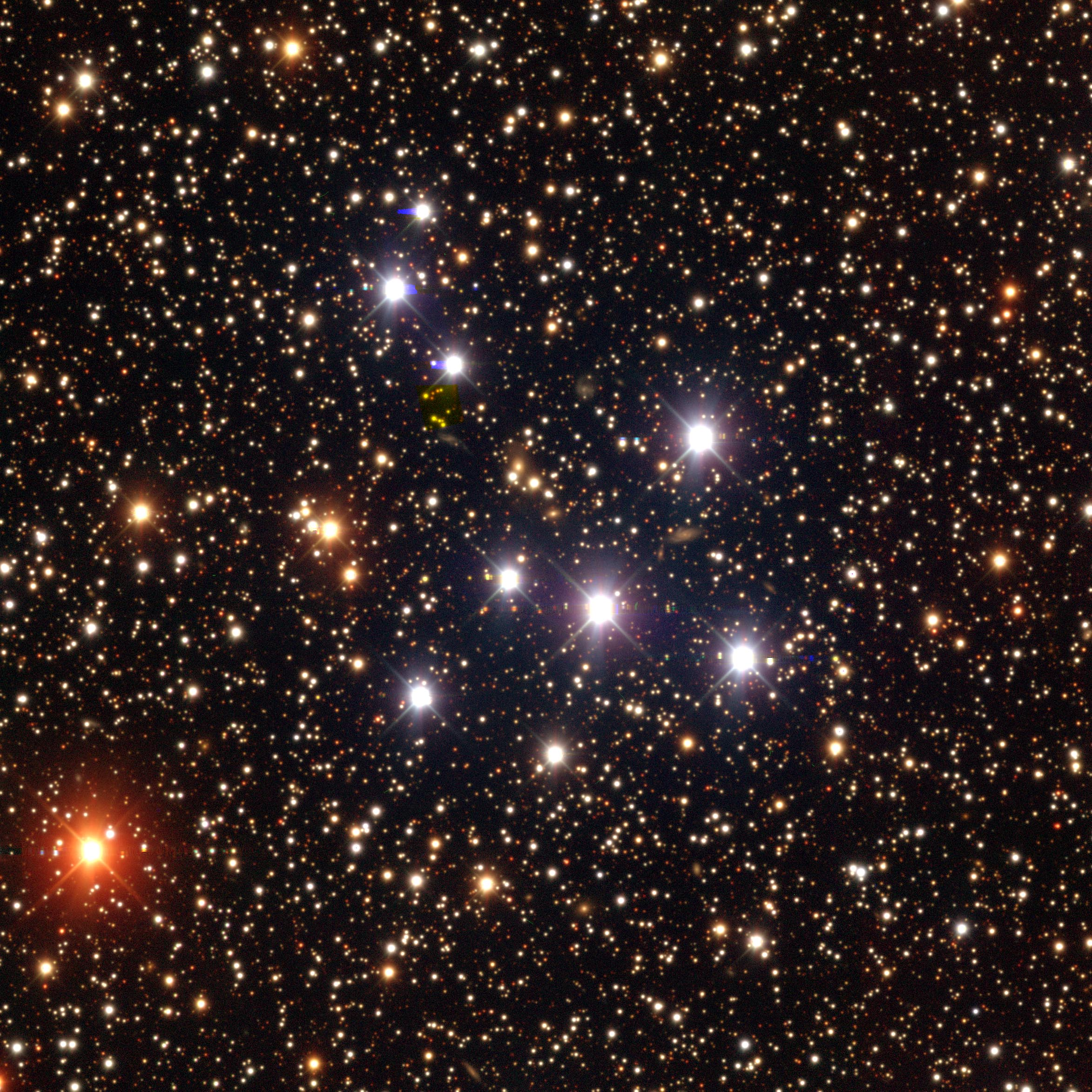
NGC 3228 with DECaPS (using the Dark Energy Camera)

NGC 3228 is an open cluster in Vela. It was discovered by Nicolas Louis de Lacaille in 1751–1752, while he was in South Africa and catalogued it as Lac II.7. It is small but bright and can be observed easily with binoculars in sufficiently dark skies.

It is a cluster of Trumpler type I1p or II3p, with few members with large brightness range and a slight concentration toward its center. Klarchenko et al. mention 53 possible members within the angular diameter of the cluster. The tidal radius of the cluster is 1.4 – 5.5 parsecs (4.5 – 18 light years) and represents the average outer limit of NGC 3228, beyond which a star is unlikely to remain gravitationally bound to the cluster core. The brightest member is of mag. 7.9 and the hottest star is of spectral type B9. One member, HD 89856 (mag. 9.04, spectral type B9), is a variable star with period 4.556 days.
