= NGC 133 =

Open cluster in the constellation Cassiopeia

- NGC 133

Observation data (J2000 epoch)
- Right ascension: 00^{h} 31^{m} 16.9^{s}
- Declination: +63° 21′ 09″

Physical characteristics
- Pretty large, stars from 10th magnitude, double star involved.
- Other designations: Collinder 3

Associations
- Constellation: Cassiopeia

NGC 133 is an open cluster in the constellation Cassiopeia. It was discovered by Heinrich d'Arrest on February 4, 1865.
