= NGC 136 =

Open cluster in the constellation Cassiopeia

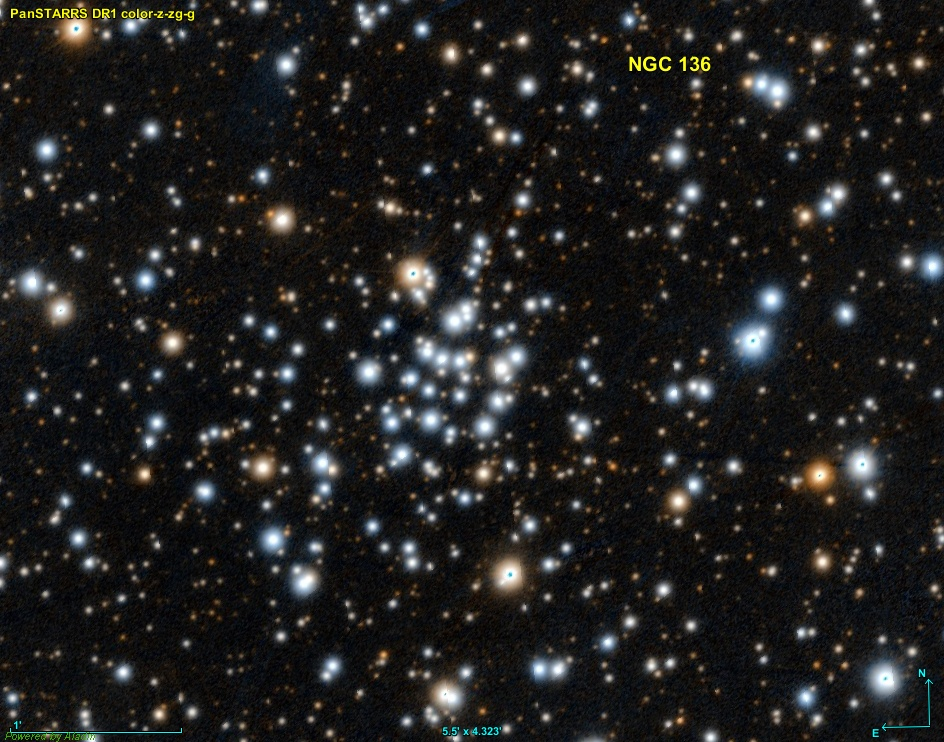

Observation data (J2000 epoch)
- Right ascension: 00^{h} 31^{m} 36.0^{s}
- Declination: +61° 30′ 36″
- Apparent magnitude (V): 11.5
- Apparent dimensions (V): 1.5′

Physical characteristics
- Estimated age: 250 Ma
- Very faint, small, and compressed
- Other designations: Collinder 4

Associations
- Constellation: Cassiopeia

NGC 136 is an open cluster of stars in the constellation Cassiopeia. It was discovered by William Herschel on November 26, 1788.
