= Trumpler 3 =

Open cluster in the constellation Cassiopeia

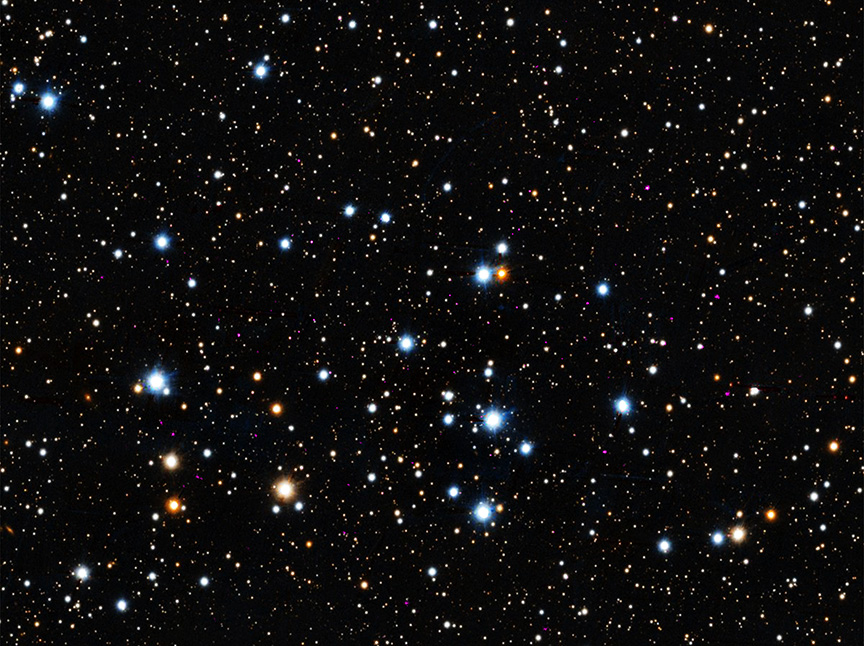
- Trumpler 3 imaged by Chandra X-ray Observatory

Observation data (J2000.0 epoch)
- Right ascension: 03^{h} 12^{m} 00^{s}
- Declination: +63° 15′ 00″
- Distance: 2250 ly (690 pc)
- Apparent magnitude (V): 7.0

Physical characteristics
- Other designations: Cr 36, Cl Harvard 1, C 0307+630

Associations
- Constellation: Cassiopeia

Trumpler 3 is an open cluster located in the constellation Cassiopeia. It has the visual magnitude of 7 and is one of the most famous star clusters in the Trumpler catalogue.

It has two bright stars, TYC 4053-658-1 and TYC 4053-466-1 of apparent magnitudes 10.16 and 10.02, respectively.

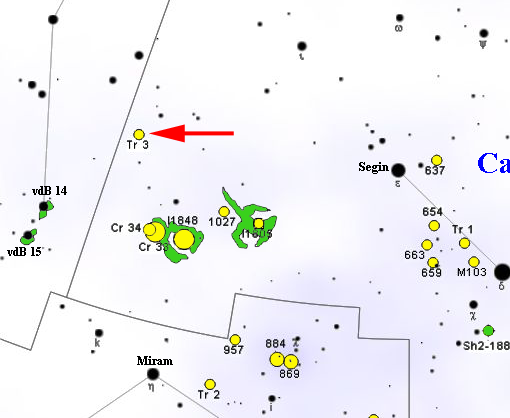
Trumpler 3's location in the constellation Cassiopeia.
