= NGC 6738 =

Asterism in the constellation Aquila

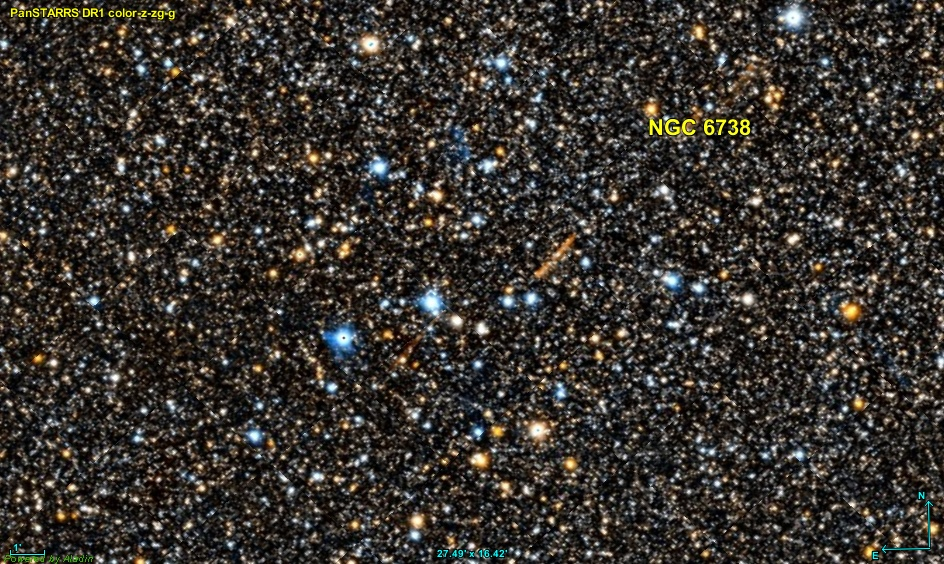
- NGC 6738 imaged by Pan-STARRS

Observation data (J2000 epoch)
- Right ascension: 19^{h} 01^{m} 1(8.0)^{s}
- Declination: +11° 37′ (00)″
- Distance: 2,283 ly (700 pc)
- Apparent magnitude (V): 8.3
- Apparent dimensions (V): 15.0′

Physical characteristics
- Other designations: Cr 396, C1859+115, OCL 101.0, KPR2004b. 459

Associations
- Constellation: Aquila

NGC 6738 is an astronomical feature that is catalogued as an NGC object. Although listed as an open cluster in some astronomical databases, it may be merely an asterism; a 2003 paper in the journal Astronomy and Astrophysics describes it as being an "apparent concentration of a few bright stars on patchy background absorption".
