= NGC 103 =

Open cluster in the constellation Cassiopeia

NGC 103 open cluster
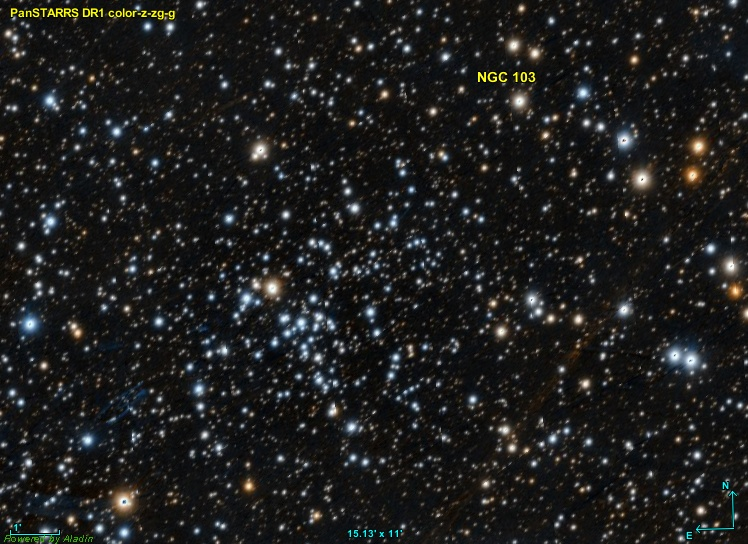

Observation data (J2000.0 epoch)
- Right ascension: 00^{h} 25^{m} 18^{s}
- Declination: +61° 21.0′
- Distance: 4600
- Apparent magnitude (V): 9.8
- Apparent dimensions (V): 5′

Physical characteristics
- Other designations: Cr 1, OCL291

Associations
- Constellation: Cassiopeia

NGC 103 is a small open cluster. It is partially visible in an 8" amateur telescope under moderately light polluted skies. It is roughly 4600 light-years from the Sun.
