= NGC 1027 =

Open star cluster in the constellation Cassiopeia

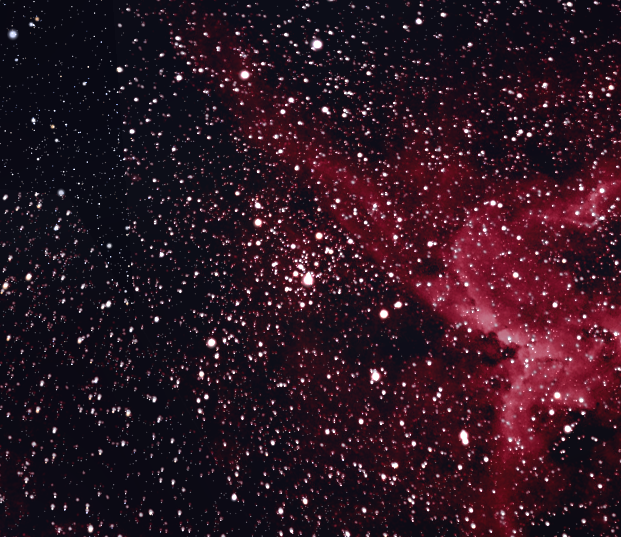
- NGC 1027 (taken from Stellarium)

Observation data (J2000 epoch)
- Right ascension: 02^{h} 42^{m} 43^{s}
- Declination: +61° 38′ 00″
- Distance: 3,100 ly (950 pc)
- Apparent magnitude (V): 6.7
- Apparent dimensions (V): 15′

Physical characteristics
- Estimated age: 355 Myr
- Other designations: Cr 30

Associations
- Constellation: Cassiopeia

NGC 1027 is an open cluster in the constellation Cassiopeia. It was discovered by William Herschel in 1787. It is visible at the eastern part of the constellation, between two emission nebulae, the Heart and Soul Nebula. However, it is not physically associated with the two nebulae, lying in the foreground, about 3,000 light years away from the Solar System. The apparent magnitude of the cluster is 6.7 and can be seen with 10x50 binoculars around a 7th magnitude star, which is not however a member of the cluster. The brightest member of the cluster has an apparent magnitude of 9.3.
