= NGC 1662 =

Open cluster in Orion

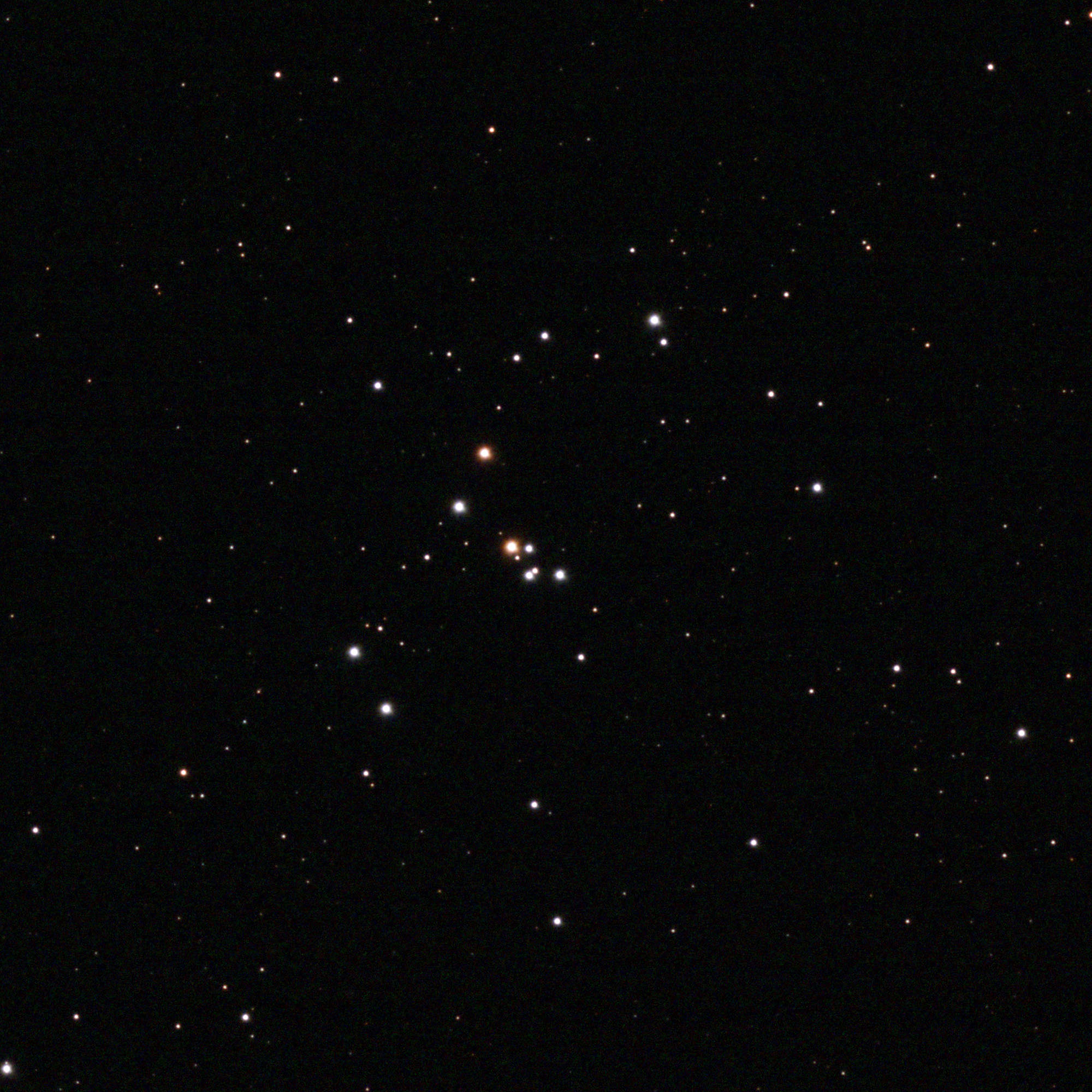

Observation data (J2000.0 epoch)
- Right ascension: 04^{h} 48^{m} 27.0^{s}
- Declination: +10° 56′ 12″
- Distance: 1,425 ly (437 pc)
- Apparent magnitude (V): 6.4
- Apparent dimensions (V): 20'

Physical characteristics
- Other designations: Cr 55

Associations
- Constellation: Orion

NGC 1662 (also known as Collinder 55) is a loosely bound open cluster located in the constellation Orion. It has an apparent magnitude of 7.6 and an approximate size of 20 arc-minutes. It is also known as the Klingon Battlecruiser Cluster by amateur astronomers. NGC 1662 was discovered by the German-British astronomer William Herschel in 1784. Although estimates of its age vary from 100 to 800 million years old, latest studies believe the cluster to be about 400 million years old.

== Location ==
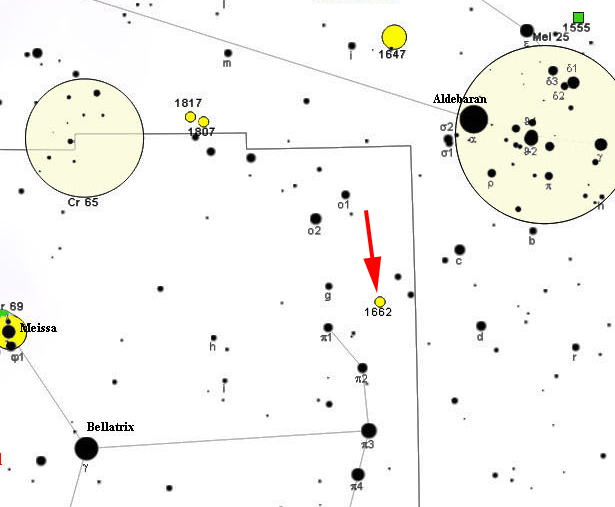
Location of NGC 1662 in the night sky

NGC 1662 lies 1.7º NE of the star Pi1 Orionis.
