= NGC 2659 =

Open cluster in the constellation Vela

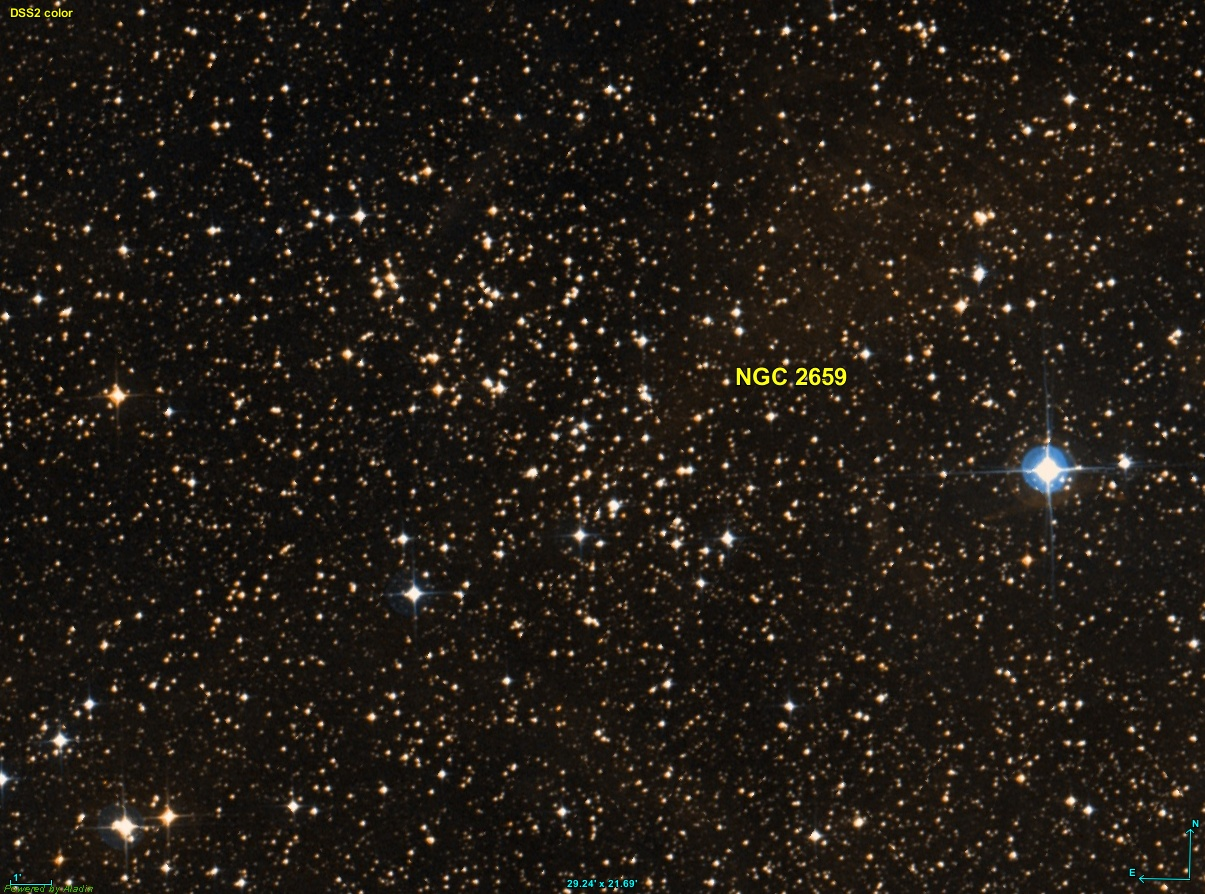

Observation data (J2000 epoch)
- Right ascension: 08^{h} 42^{m} 36^{s}
- Declination: −44° 59′ 00″
- Distance: 5,580 ly (1,713 pc)
- Apparent magnitude (V): 8.6
- Apparent dimensions (V): 2.7'

Physical characteristics
- Estimated age: 7.8 million years
- Other designations: Cr 194, VDBH 46

Associations
- Constellation: Vela

NGC 2659 is an open cluster in the constellation Vela. It was discovered by John Herschel on 3 February 1835. It is of Trumpler class III3m. It is a young cluster, with age nearly 8 million years. The core of the cluster is 1.93 parsec (6.3 light years) across and the total radius is 3.6 pc (11.7 light years). The total number of stars that belong to the cluster is estimated to be 1,801 ± 608 stars and the total mass 857 ± 237 M_{☉}. Among its members, one is a Be star, with four more possible Be stars.
