= NGC 609 =

Star cluster in the constellation Cassiopeia

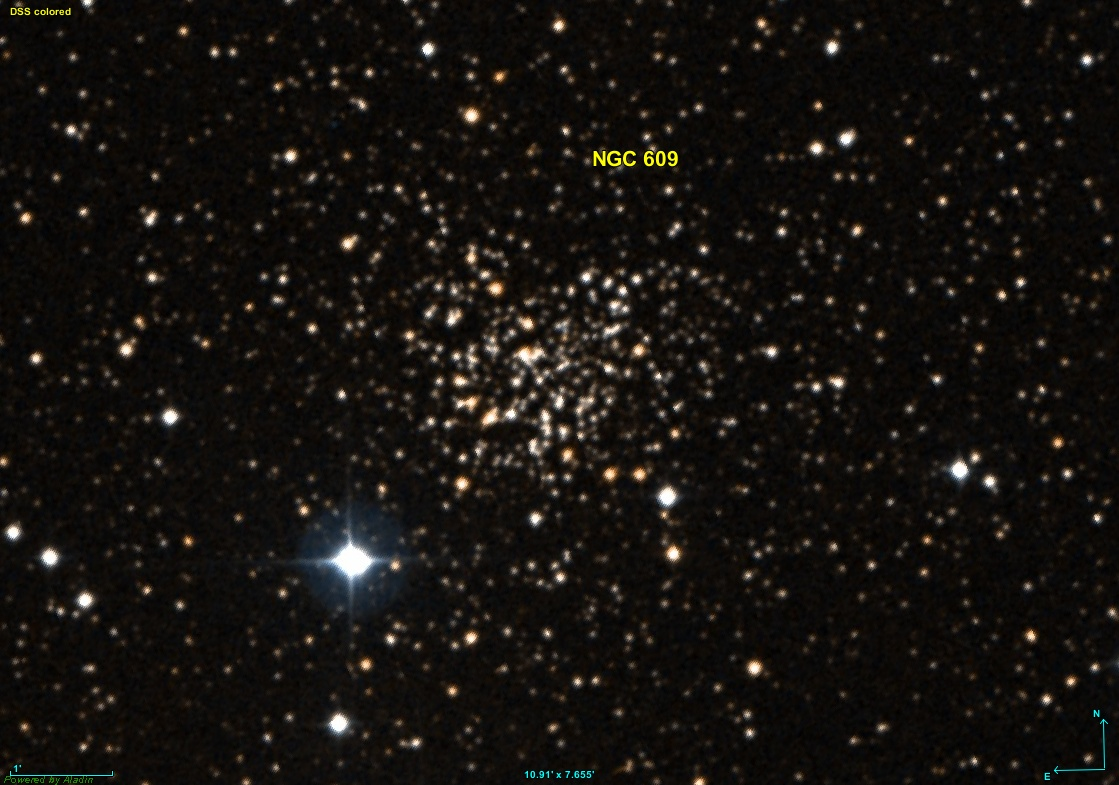
- The open cluster NGC 609

Observation data (J2000 epoch)
- Right ascension: 01^{h} 38^{m} 11^{s}
- Declination: +64° 39′ 57″
- Distance: 12984.29 (3981)

Physical characteristics
- Estimated age: 1710 Ma

Associations
- Constellation: Cassiopeia

NGC 609 (also known as C 0133+643) is a small open cluster located in the constellation Cassiopeia containing approximately 261 stars. Given its visual magnitude of 11, NGC 609 is visible with the help of a telescope having an aperture of 6 inches (150mm) or more. It was discovered by 19th century German astronomer Heinrich d'Arrest on 9 August 1863. NGC 609 is moving towards the Sun with a radial velocity of −44.32 km/s±0.68. The object is located approximately 12,984.29 light years, (3981 pc), from the Earth.
