= NGC 7031 =

Star cluster in the constellation Cygnus

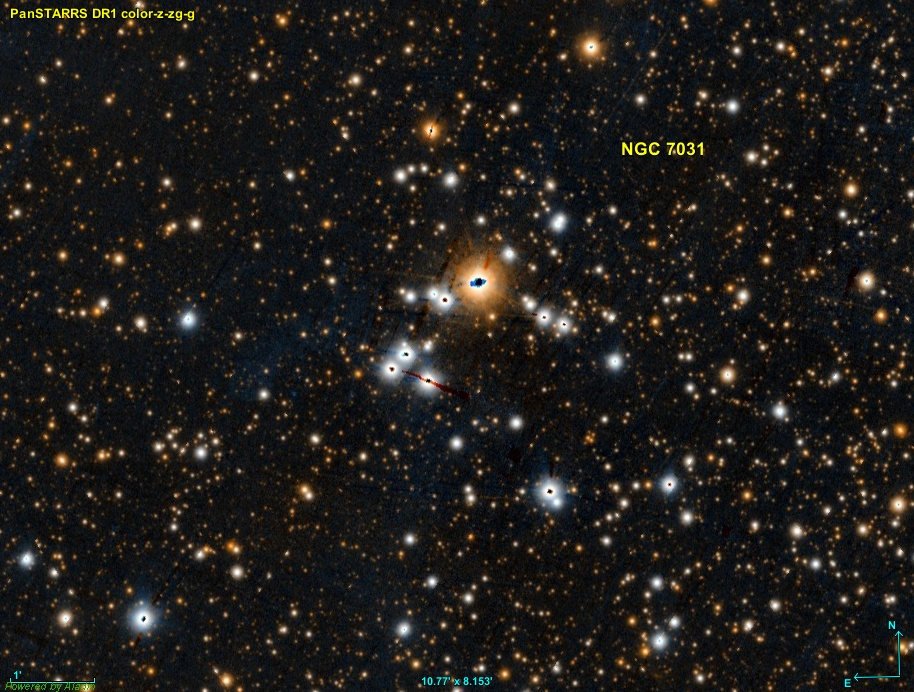
- The open cluster NGC 7031 in the Pan-STARRS survey

Observation data (J2000 epoch)
- Right ascension: 21^{h} 08^{m} 02^{s}
- Declination: +50° 58′ 42″
- Distance: 2,934 ly (900 pc)
- Apparent magnitude (V): 9.1
- Apparent dimensions (V): 3.9′

Physical characteristics

Associations
- Constellation: Cygnus

NGC 7031 is a small open cluster located in the constellation Cygnus. It was discovered by German-British astronomer William Herschel on September 21, 1788. It is located at a distance of about 2,934 light-years (900pc) from the Sun and 29,000 light-years from the Galactic Center.

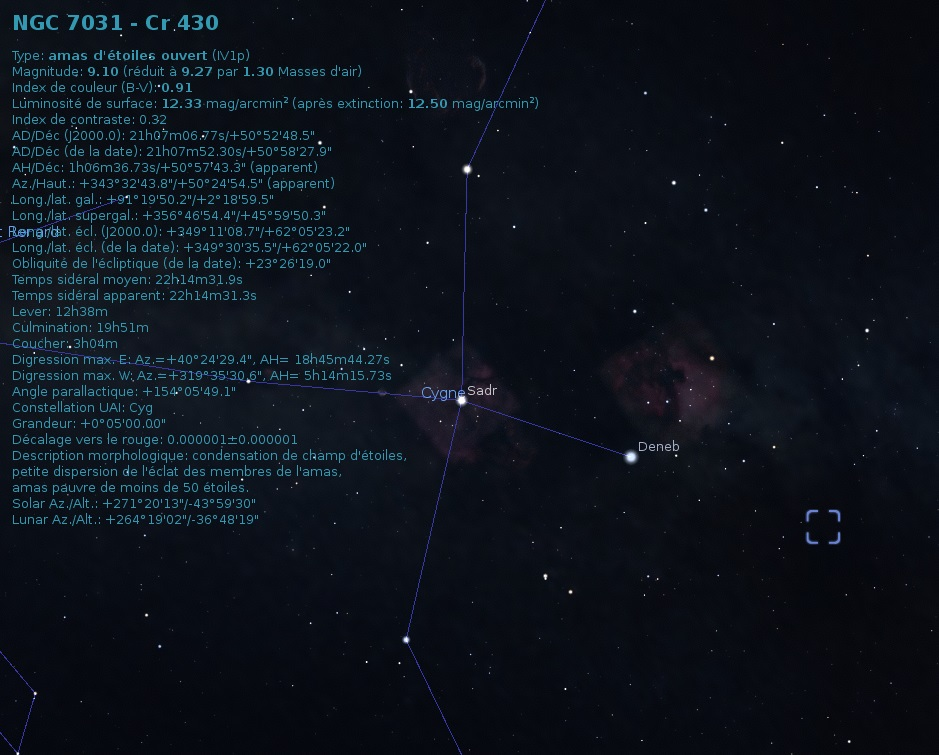
Location of NGC 7031 in the sky
