= NGC 4230 =

Open cluster in the constellation Centaurus

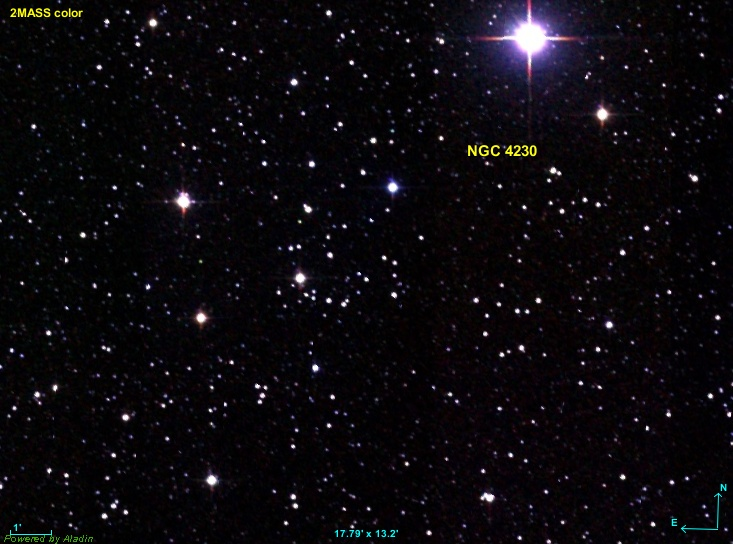
- NGC 4230 imaged by 2MASS

Observation data (J2000 epoch)
- Right ascension: 12^{h} 17^{m} 09.4^{s}
- Declination: −55° 17′ 10″
- Apparent magnitude (V): 9.0
- Apparent dimensions (V): 5′ × 7′

Physical characteristics
- Other designations: GC 2820

Associations
- Constellation: Centaurus

NGC 4230 is a loosely scattered open cluster in the constellation of Centaurus. It was discovered by John Herschel on April 5, 1837. NGC 4230 is situated south of the celestial equator and is more easily visible from the southern hemisphere

The ESO catalog (and SIMBAD database) misidentify ESO 171-SC14 as NGC 4230.

== See also ==
- Open cluster
- List of NGC objects (4001–5000)
- Centaurus (constellation)
