= NGC 1605 =

Open cluster in the constellation Perseus

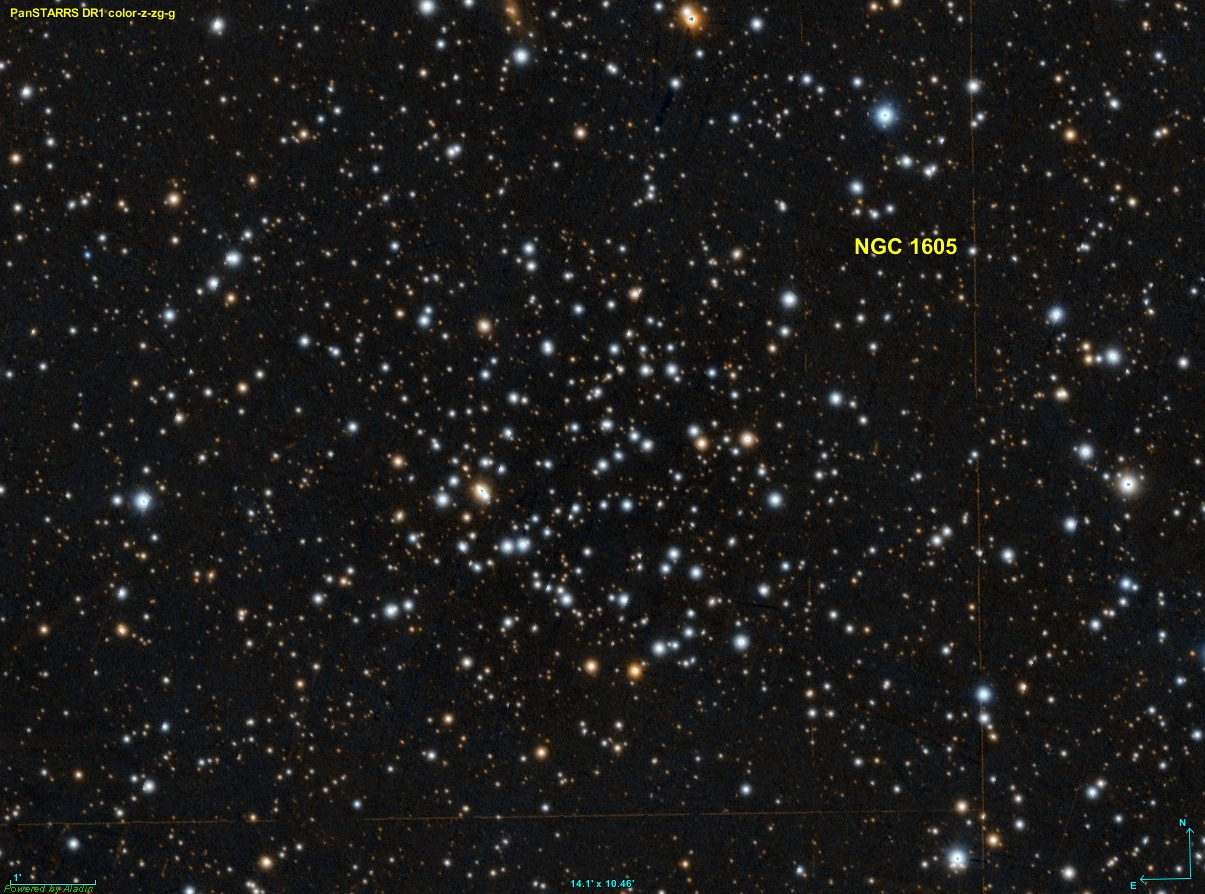
- Pan-STARRS image of NGC 1605

Observation data (J2000 epoch)
- Right ascension: 04^{h} 34^{m} 58.4^{s}
- Declination: +45° 16′ 09″
- Distance: 7,990 ± 320 ly (2,449 ± 98 pc)
- Apparent magnitude (V): 11.0
- Apparent dimensions (V): 5.0′ × 5.0′

Physical characteristics
- Mass: 623 M_{☉}
- Estimated age: 400±50 Myr

Associations
- Constellation: Perseus

NGC 1605 is an open cluster of stars in the northern constellation of Perseus. It was discovered by German-British astronomer William Herschel on December 11, 1786. This cluster is located at a distance of approximately 8,000 ly (2,449 pc) from the Sun. It spans an angular size of 5.0′ × 5.0′ with an apparent visual magnitude of 11.0.

== Observations ==
This cluster has a low concentration with a Trumpler class of III 2 m. It is estimated to have 623 times the mass of the Sun with a core radius of 2.49+0.27
−0.41 pc. The cluster is drifting closer to the Sun with a line of sight velocity component of −15.27±1.35 km/s. It is a member of the young thin disk population of the Milky Way.

In 2021, D. Camargo presented results that suggested NGC 1605 is actually a binary open cluster system. The data showed two distinct stellar populations in the region: NGC 1605a with an age of 600 Myr and NGC 1605b at an age of 2 Gyr. This large age difference seemed to indicate a close encounter between two clusters that resulted in tidal capture. The presence of possible tidal debris appeared to support this hypothesis. However, a 2022 study of Gaia 3 data contradicted this finding, suggesting the apparent difference was the result of contamination by field stars.

The open cluster Can Batlló 1 may be located less than 330 light-years (100 pc) from NGC 1605.
