= NGC 2567 =

Open cluster in the constellation Puppis

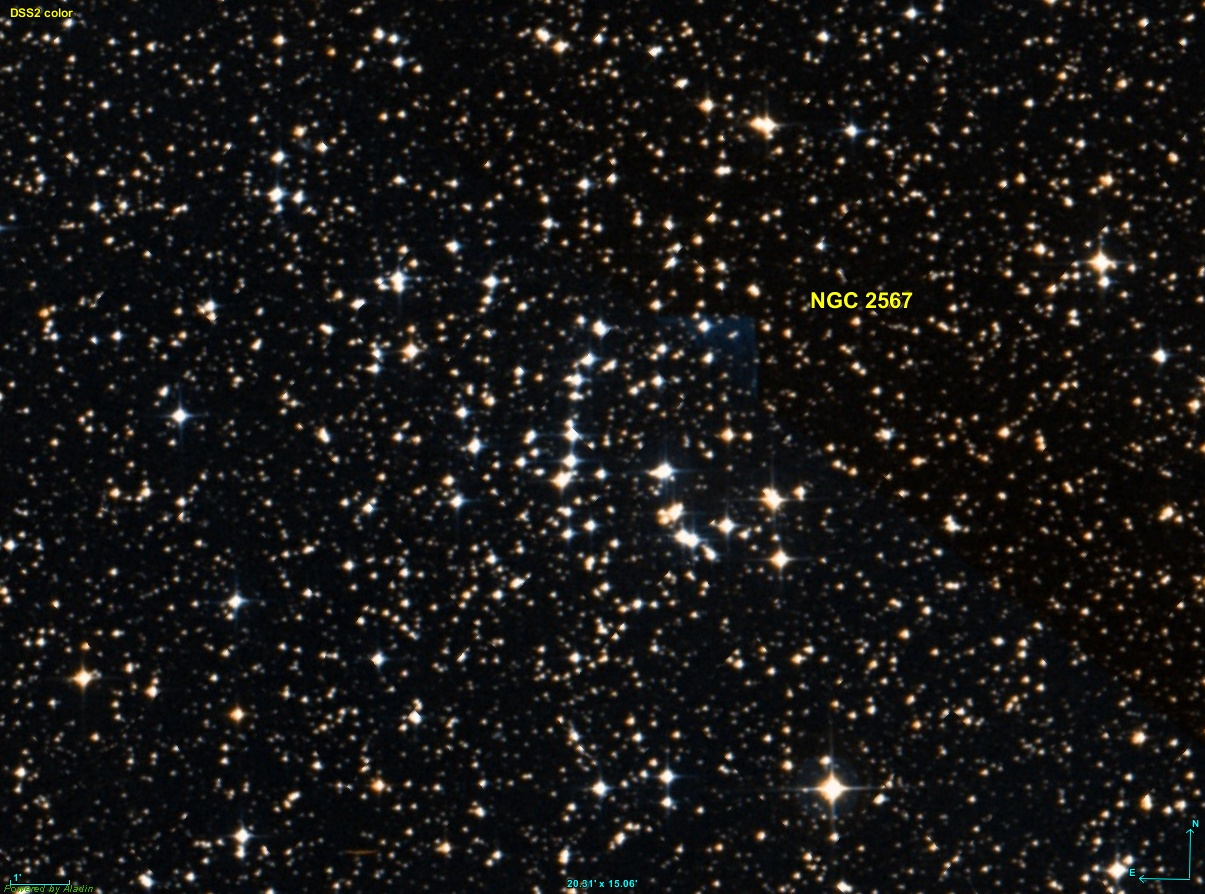

Observation data (J2000 epoch)
- Right ascension: 08^{h} 18^{m} 35.1821^{s}
- Declination: −30° 38′ 08.161″
- Distance: 5,469 ly (1,677 pc)
- Apparent magnitude (V): 7.4
- Apparent dimensions (V): 11′

Physical characteristics
- Other designations: ESO 431-SC 003

Associations
- Constellation: Puppis

NGC 2567 is an open cluster of stars in southern constellation of Puppis. It was discovered on March 4, 1793, by William Herschel. It is a young cluster, estimated to be approximately 500 million years old. The metallicity is very close to solar. It is not very populous, containing between 81 and 96 stars.
