= NGC 6830 =

Open cluster in the constellation Vulpecula

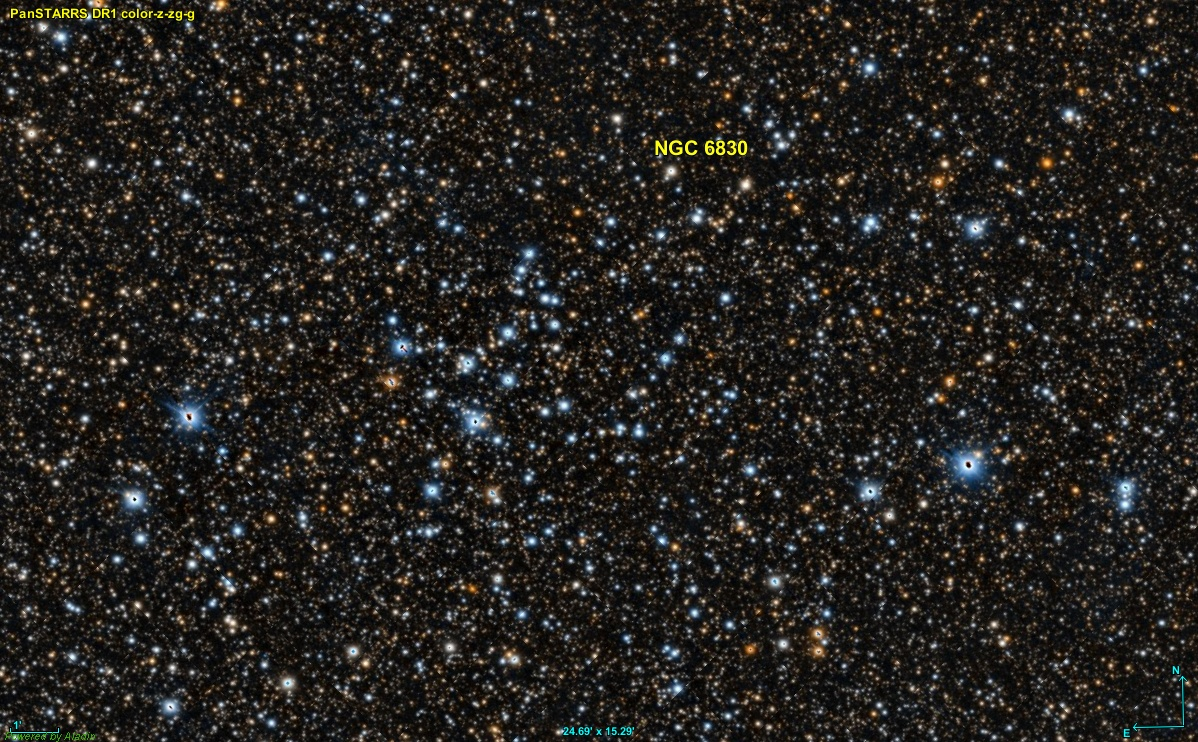
- NGC 6830 imaged by Pan-STARRS

Observation data
- Right ascension: 19^{h} 52^{m} 07^{s}
- Declination: ±23° 10′ 05″
- Distance: ~6,000 Lj
- Apparent magnitude (V): 7.9
- Absolute magnitude (V): -3.65
- Apparent dimensions (V): 4.2' x 4.2'

Physical characteristics
- Other designations: Collinder 406, Melotte 224

Associations
- Constellation: Vulpecula

NGC 6830, also known as the Poodle Cluster, is an open cluster in Vulpecula. It contains about 150 members. It was discovered by William Herschel on July 19, 1784, and later observed by John Herschel on July 12, 1830.
