= NGC 1582 =

Open cluster

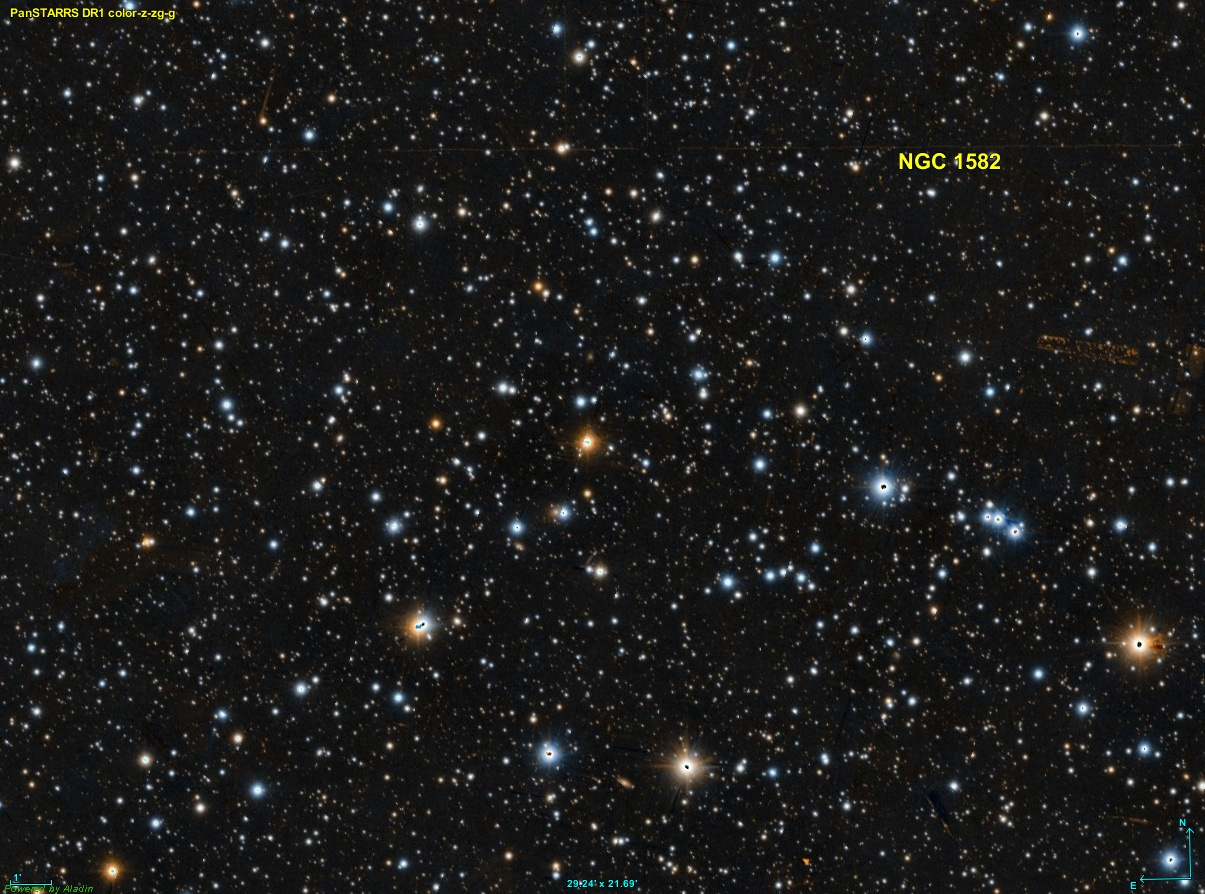
- The open cluster NGC 1582

Observation data (J2000 epoch)
- Right ascension: 04^{h} 31^{m} 46.8^{s}
- Declination: +43° 57′ 05″
- Distance: 3,600 ly (1,100 pc) (1100)
- Apparent magnitude (V): 7.0
- Apparent dimensions (V): 24 arcminute

Physical characteristics
- Radius: ~12.5
- Estimated age: 302 Ma
- Trumpler classification IV2p
- Other designations: OCL 407

Associations
- Constellation: Perseus

NGC 1582 is an open cluster located in the constellation of Perseus. It was discovered by the German-British astronomer William Herschel in 1788.

NGC 1582 is located about 1,100 pc (3,600 ly) from the Solar System, and the latest estimates give it an age of about 302 million years. The apparent diameter of the cluster is 24.0 arcminutes, which, given the distance, corresponds to a true diameter of roughly 25 light-years.

According to the classification of open clusters by Robert Trumpler, this cluster contains fewer than 50 stars (letter p), has a low concentration (IV), and the magnitudes of its stars span a moderate range (number 2).

== See also ==
- List of NGC objects
