= NGC 5606 =

Open cluster in the constellation Centaurus

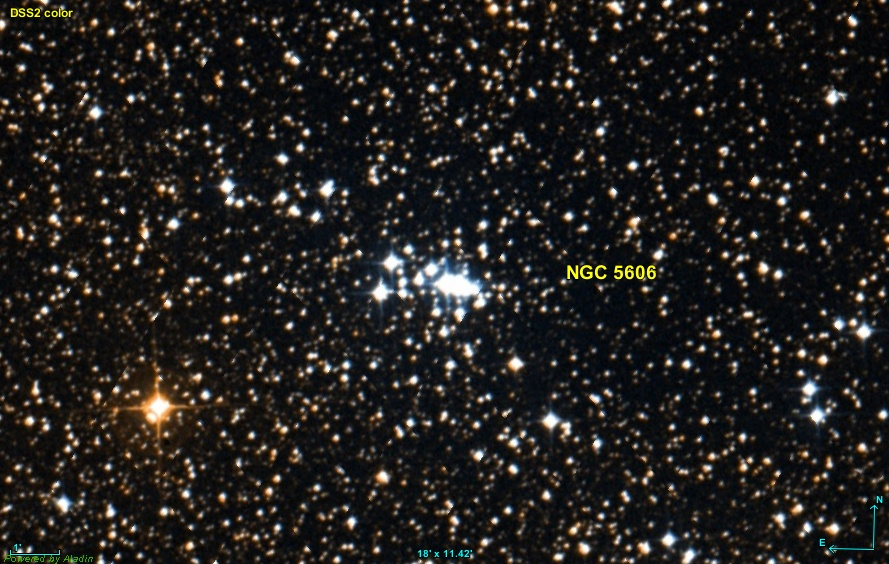
- NGC 5606 seen from Digitalize Sky Survey

Observation data (J2000 epoch)
- Right ascension: 14^{h} 27^{m} 45.6^{s}
- Declination: −59° 37′ 58.0″
- Distance: 5900 light years (2200 ± 300 pc)
- Apparent magnitude (V): 5.6

Physical characteristics
- Mass: 417 ± 81 M_{☉}
- Radius: 8.5 ± 1.3 light-years (2.6 ± 0.4 parsecs)
- Estimated age: 4.5 ± 1.5 Million Years
- Other designations: BH 158, Cr 281, C1424-594, GC 3874., JH 3568, Dunlop 313, OCL 922, ESO 134-SC 003

Associations
- Constellation: Centaurus
- Galaxy: Milky Way

NGC 5606 is an open cluster in the constellation Centaurus. It was discovered by James Dunlop on May 8, 1826 and also observed by John Herschel on Jul 6, 1836.

NGC 5606 is about 2.1 degrees from Alpha Centauri. The open cluster NGC 5617 is in the same region of the sky. The galactic longitude and latitude of NGC 5606 is 315.19 degrees and 0.61 degrees respectively and the angular diameter (in arcminutes) of NGC 5606 is 3.5. The furthest cluster member is approximately 10 arcminutes from the core of the cluster. The cluster is located in the inner side of the Carina–Sagittarius Arm. The two cluster stars in the Henry Draper Catalogue (HD) are HD 126357 and 126449. HD 126357 is a Beta Cephei variable, and the cluster also contains two pulsating variables, CD-59 5259 and CD-59 5260

== Properties ==
NGC 5606 has a central density (σ₀) of 25 ± 5 pc⁻² and a core radius ($r_c$) of 0.51 ± 0.13 pc, indicating it is a centrally concentrated open cluster. It has a foreground reddening E(B-V) of 0.31 ± 0.03 (Another paper suggests 0.51, 1.7–1.8), indicating that it has two levels of interstellar dust along the field of vision.

A polarimetric study has been conducted, and found that the polarization percentage is 2.970% at a wavelength of peak polarization ($\lambda_{max}$) at 6325 Å, and the polarization angle ($\theta_p$) is 70.9° indicating the interstellar dust is aligned along the line of sight. The maximum polarization of 2-4% and wavelengths of maximum polarization around 0.5 - 0.7 μm, indicate it is typical interstellar dust.

Using Gaia DR2's data, astronomers using the proper motion method found that some NCG 5606 member stars have dissolved into field stars, as astronomers call it "melted", making it harder for astronomers to determine the membership of the star members in NGC 5606.

A total of 10 stars in NGC 5606 are (B0 IV), 7 stars are OB-, 3 stars are B0/1(III), 4 stars are B1 IV, and 1 B1 III, B1 IV and B1.5 IV stars, confirming that it is a young star cluster. The brightest star in NGC 5606 is UCAC4 152-136892, with a magnitude V of 8.77. The dimmest star is 2MASS J14281026-5939400, which has a magnitude V of 18.08.

The age of NGC 5606 is not precisely determined, with estimates ranging from 2.5, 4.5, 6.3-7, 18-30 million years old, due to using different methods to study NGC 5606 (isochrone fitting, PMS models), and different wavelengths (Optical, near Infrared).

== Gallery ==
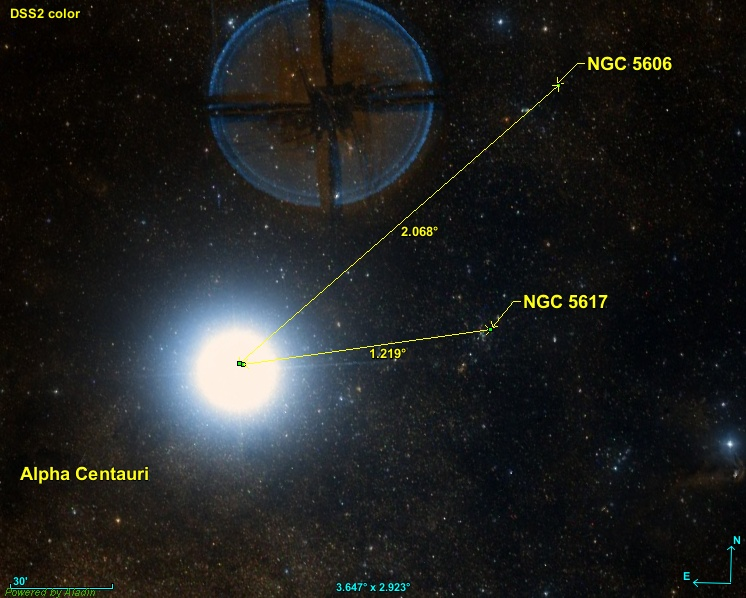
NGC 5606 position

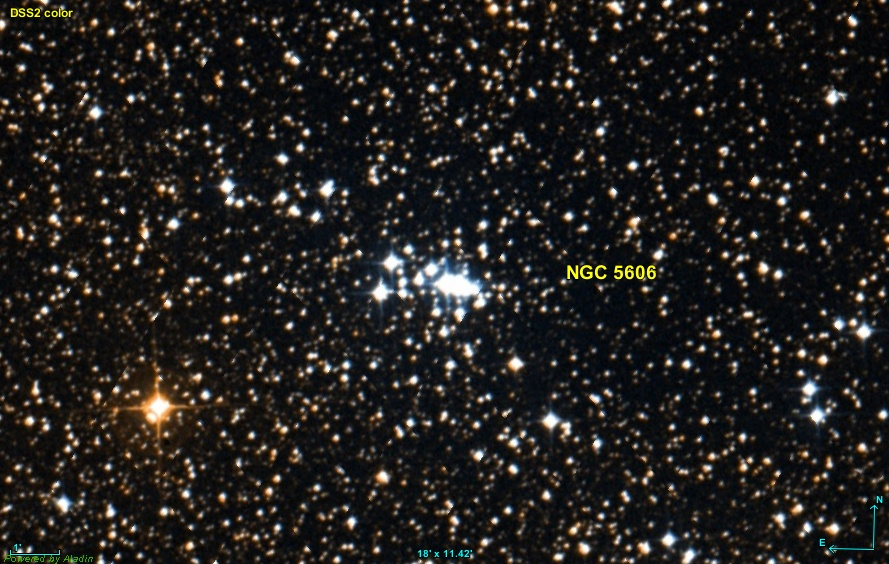
NGC 5606 seen by Digital Sky Survey

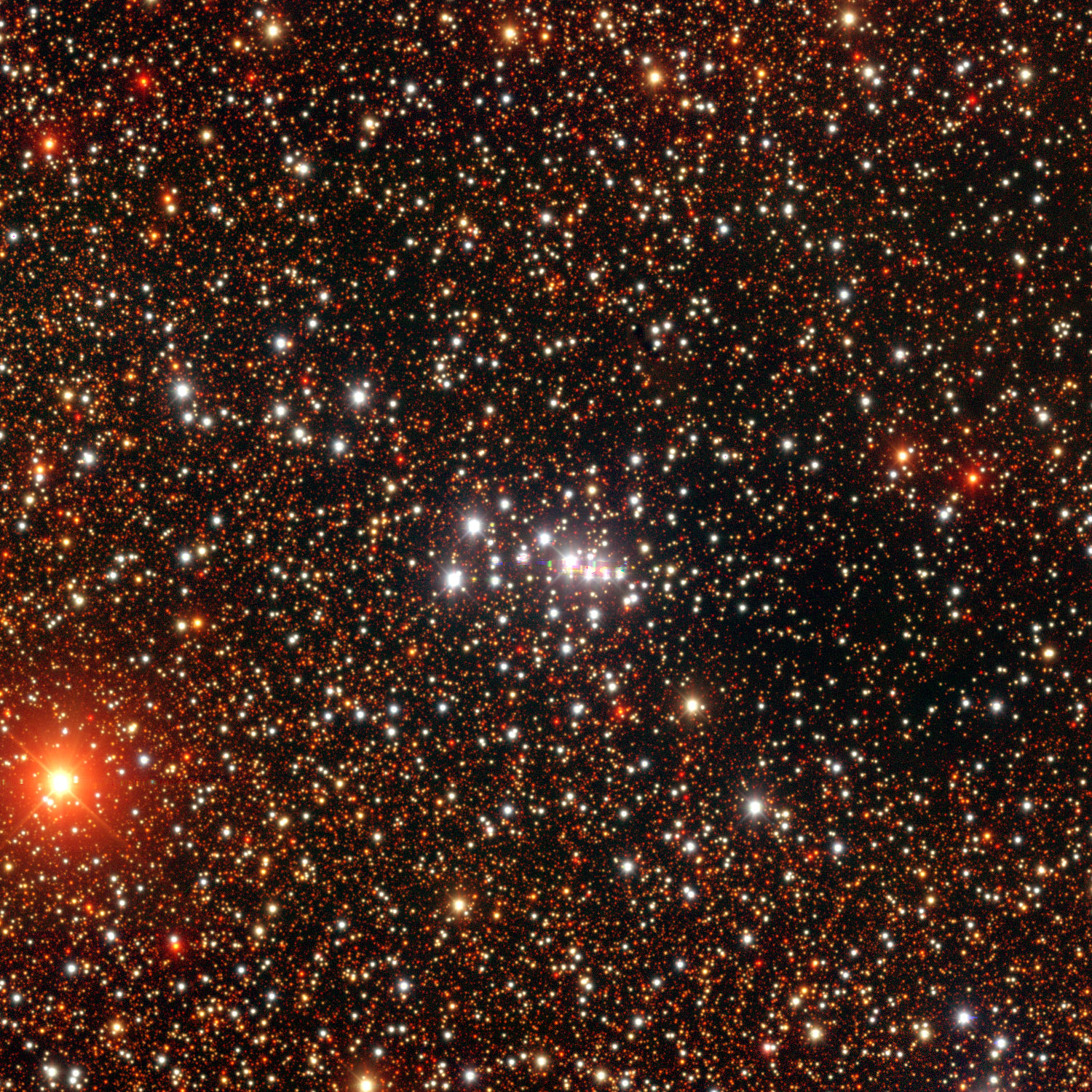
NGC 5606 as seen by Dark Energy Camera Plane Survey Data Release 2
