= Per Collinder =

Swedish astronomer (1890–1975)

Doctor Per Collinder
- Born: 22 May 1890; Sundsvall, Sweden
- Died: 6 December 1975 (age 85); Uppsala, Sweden
- Occupation: astronomer

Dr. Per Arne Collinder (22 May 1890 – 6 December 1975) was a Swedish astronomer, cartographer, and navigator.

Collinder was born in Sundsvall in 1890. Despite his astronomical career being most famous, his professional life was as a surveyor in the Arctic Ocean. He served as surveyor and cartographer for the Swedish Royal Hydrographic Office from 1914-1937. He then became head of the Swedish Bureau of Nautical Instruments from 1937-1945, and then President of the Swedish Compass Adjusters' Association.

He is best known for a catalog of open clusters that he published in 1931, which is today known as the Collinder catalogue. He wrote the books History of navigation and Worlds in Orbit.

He was married twice, and his first wife gave him four children. Collinder died at Uppsala.
