= NGC 744 =

Star cluster in the constellation Perseus constellation

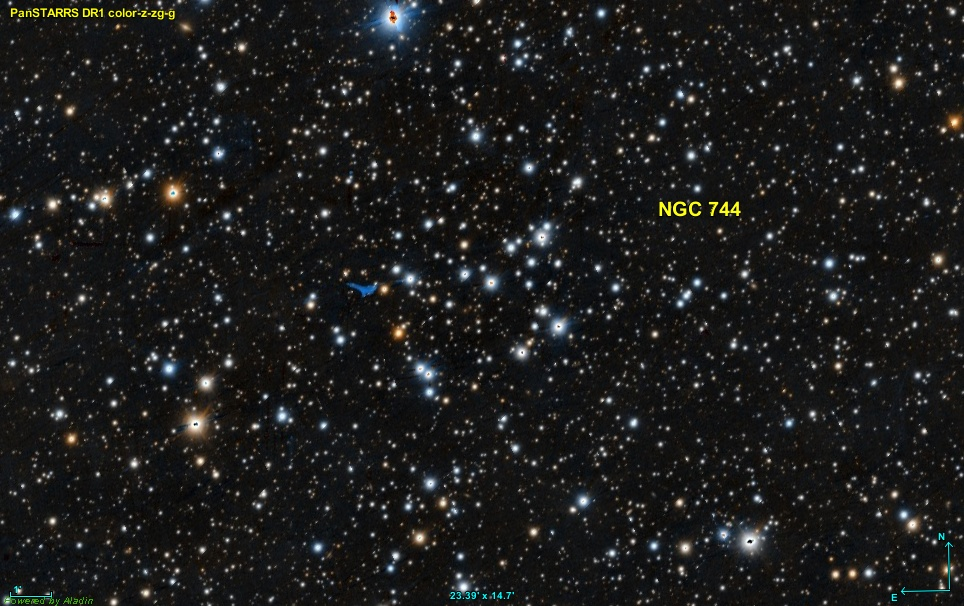
- The open cluster NGC 744

Observation data (J2000 epoch)
- Right ascension: 02^{h} 00^{m} 12^{s}
- Declination: +55° 35′ 50″
- Apparent magnitude (V): 7.9

Physical characteristics

Associations
- Constellation: Perseus

NGC 744 (also known as C 0155+552) is a small open cluster located in the constellation Perseus containing approximately 140 stars. It was discovered by 19th century English astronomer John Herschel on 28 November 1831. NGC 744 has a visual magnitude of 7.9 and is visible with the help of a telescope having an aperture of 1.50 inches (40mm) or more, and is moving towards the Sun with a radial velocity of -25.47 km/s±0.15. It is located approximately 4478.13 light years, (1373 pc), from the Earth.

== Gallery ==
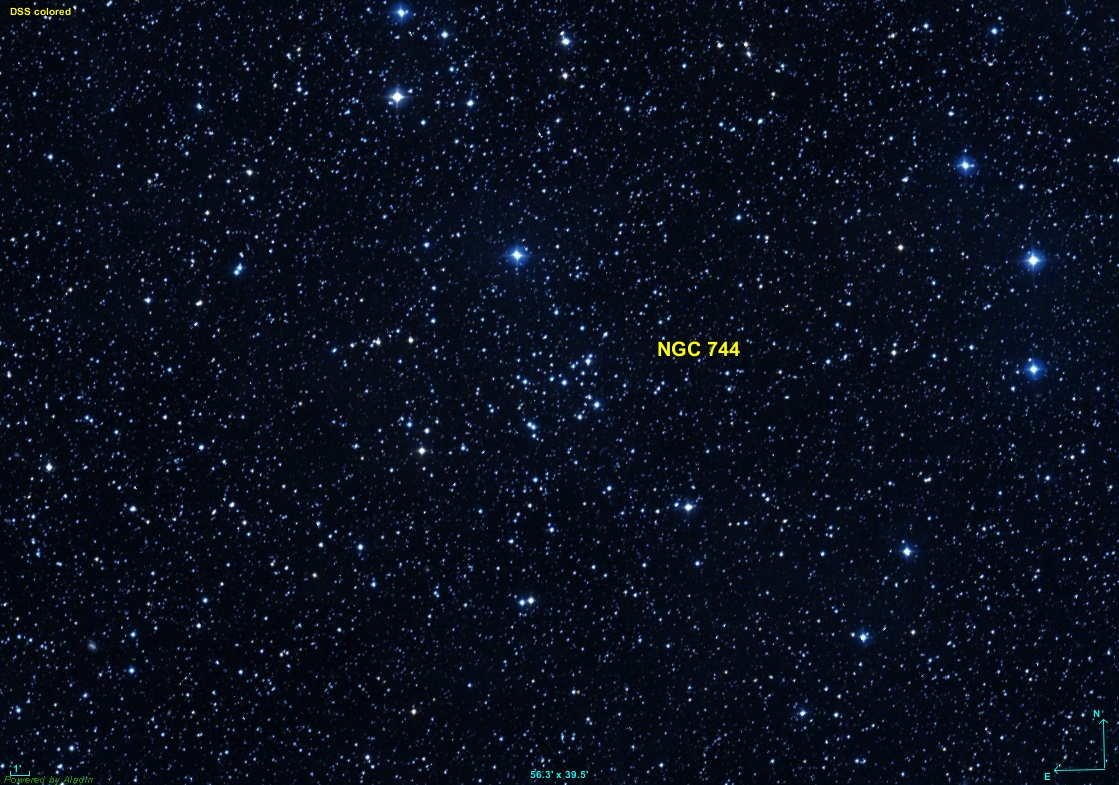
Image created using Aladin Sky Atlas software from the Strasbourg Astronomical Data Center and DSS (Digitized Sky Survey) data.

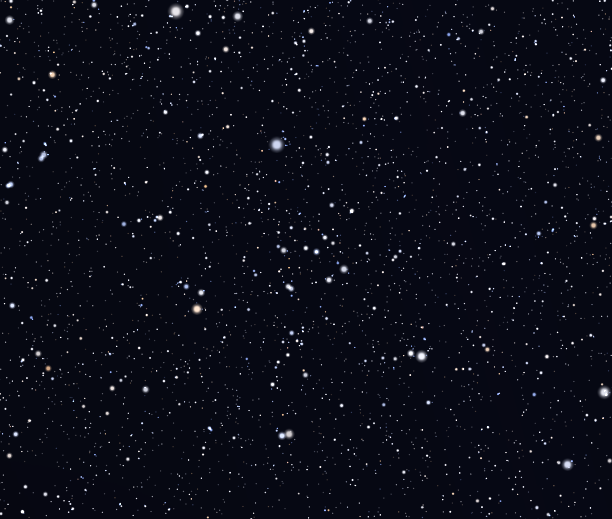
NGC 744 (taken from Stellarium)

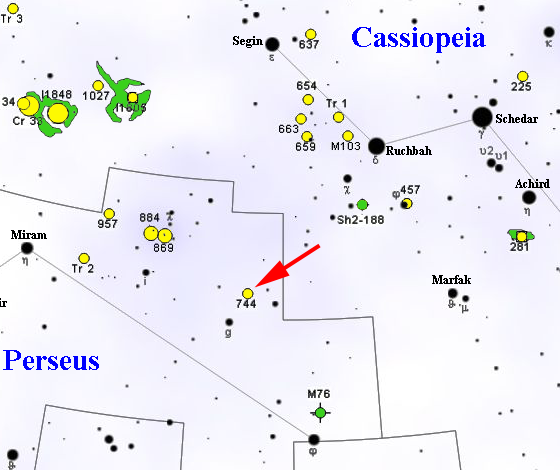
Map of the location of NGC 744
