= NGC 6005 =

Open star cluster in the constellation Norma

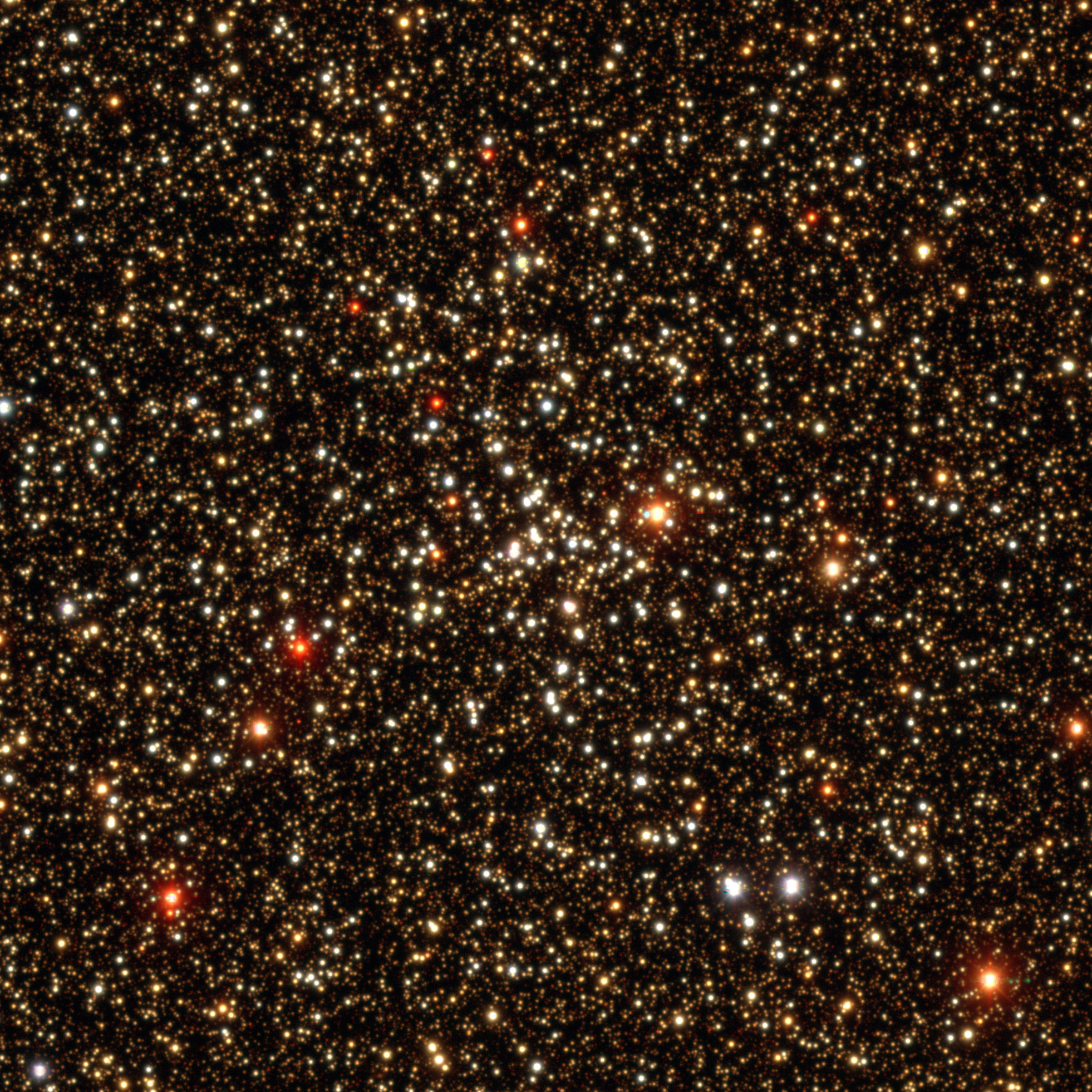
- NGC 6005; Credit: DECaPS

Observation data (J2000 epoch)
- Right ascension: 15^{h} 55^{m} 58^{s}
- Declination: −57° 26′ 24″
- Distance: 5875
- Apparent magnitude (V): 10.7

Physical characteristics
- Estimated age: 1.15 billion years

Associations
- Constellation: Norma

NGC 6005 is an open cluster in the constellation Norma. It is 5875 light-years distant and thought to be around 1.15 billion years old.
