= NGC 5925 =

Open cluster in the constellation Norma

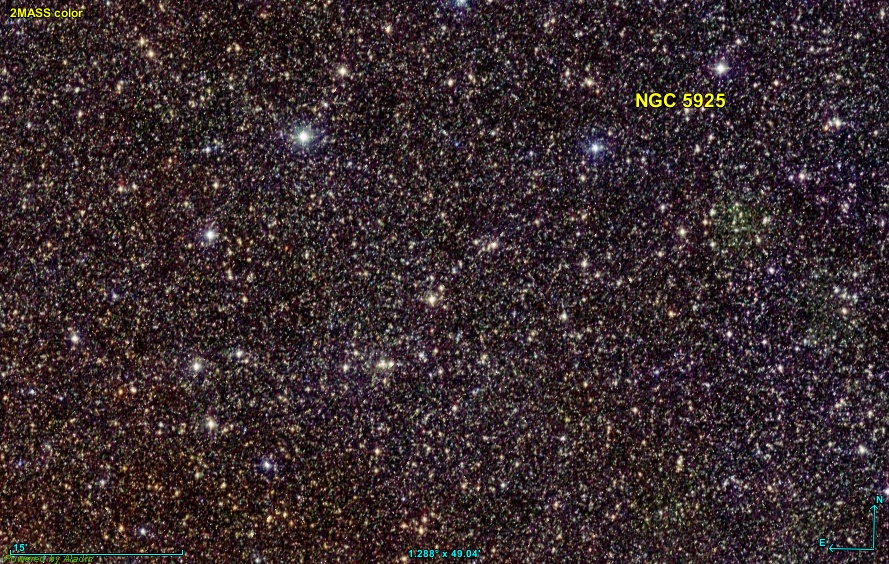
- NGC 5925

Observation data (J2000 epoch)
- Right ascension: 15^{h} 27^{m} 26.6^{s}
- Declination: −54° 32′ 04″
- Distance: 5070
- Apparent magnitude (V): 8.4

Physical characteristics
- Estimated age: 316 million years

Associations
- Constellation: Norma

NGC 5925 is an open cluster in the constellation Norma. It is 5070 light-years distant and thought to be around 316 million years old.
