= Melotte catalogue =

Catalogue of 245 star clusters compiled By British astronomer Philibert Jacques Melotte

Melotte Catalogue
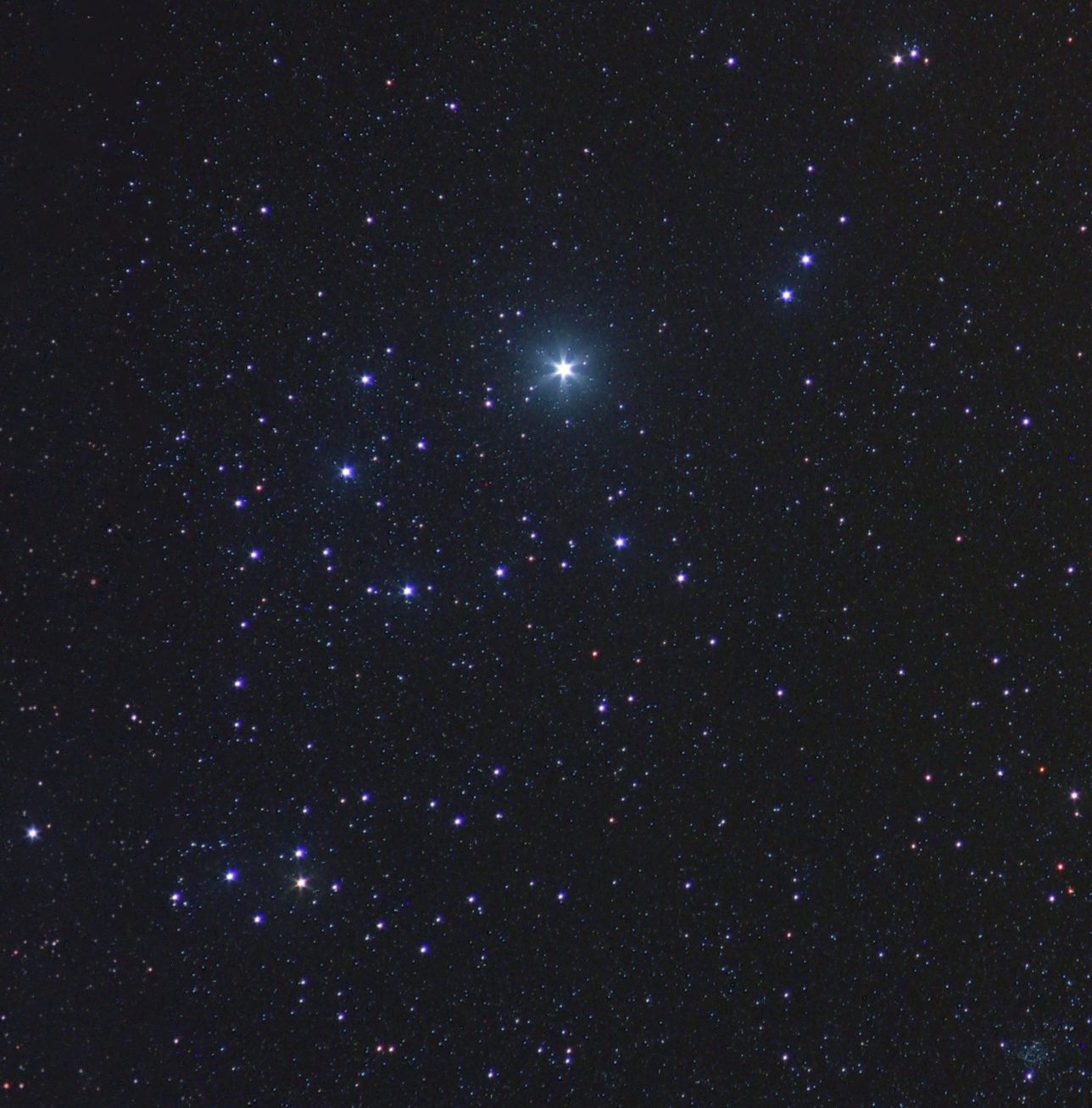
- Melotte 20, an open cluster in the constellation Perseus that was first catalogued by Philibert Jacques Melotte in 1915.
- Related media on Commons

The Melotte catalogue is a catalogue of 245 star clusters compiled by British astronomer Philibert Jacques Melotte. It was published in 1915 as A Catalogue of Star Clusters shown on Franklin-Adams Chart Plates. Catalogue objects are denoted by Melotte, e.g. "Melotte 20". Dated prefixes include as Mel + catalogue number, e.g. "Mel 20".

The catalogue contains 161 open clusters, 81 globular clusters, two asterisms, and one galaxy.

== Star chart ==
Chart of Melotte Catalogue objects

== Melotte objects ==
Melotte number	NGC/IC number	Other names	Image	Object type	Constellation	Apparent magnitude
Mel 1	NGC 104	47 Tucanae		Globular cluster	Tucana	4.1
Mel 2	NGC 188			Open cluster	Cepheus	10.0
Mel 3	NGC 288			Globular cluster	Sculptor	9.4
Mel 4	NGC 362			Globular cluster	Tucana	6.4
Mel 5	NGC 371			Open cluster	Tucana	-
Mel 6	NGC 436			Open cluster	Cassiopeia	8.8
Mel 7	NGC 457	ET Cluster, Owl Cluster		Open cluster	Cassiopeia	6.4
Mel 8	NGC 581			Open cluster	Cassiopeia	7.4
Mel 9	NGC 654			Open cluster	Cassiopeia	6.5
Mel 10	NGC 659			Open cluster	Cassiopeia	7.9
Mel 11	NGC 663			Open cluster	Cassiopeia	7.1
Mel 12	NGC 752			Open cluster	Andromeda	5.7
Mel 13	NGC 869	h Persei of Double Cluster		Open cluster	Perseus	3.7
Mel 14	NGC 884	χ Persei of Double Cluster		Open cluster	Perseus	3.8
Mel 15	IC 1805	Heart Nebula		Open cluster	Cassiopeia	6.5
Mel 16	NGC 1027			Open cluster	Cassiopeia	6.7
Mel 17	NGC 1039			Open cluster	Perseus	5.5
Mel 18	NGC 1245			Open cluster	Perseus	8.4
Mel 19	NGC 1261			Globular cluster	Horologium	8.6
Mel 20	-	Alpha Persei Cluster		Open cluster	Perseus	1.2
Mel 21	NGC 1342			Open cluster	Perseus	6.7
Mel 22	-	Pleiades		Open cluster	Taurus	1.6
Mel 23	NGC 1528			Open cluster	Perseus	6.4
Mel 24	IC 361			Open cluster	Camelopardalis	11.7
Mel 25	-	Hyades		Open cluster	Taurus	0.5
Mel 26	NGC 1647			Open cluster	Taurus	6.4
Mel 27	NGC 1664			Open cluster	Auriga	7.6
Mel 28	NGC 1746			Asterism	Taurus	6.1
Mel 29	NGC 1807			Asterism	Orion, Taurus	7.4
Mel 30	NGC 1851			Globular cluster	Columba	7.3
Mel 31	-			Open cluster	Auriga	-
Mel 32	NGC 1857			Open cluster	Auriga	7.0
Mel 33	NGC 1893			Open cluster	Auriga	7.5
Mel 34	NGC 1904			Globular cluster	Lepus	8.6
Mel 35	NGC 1907			Open cluster	Auriga	8.2
Mel 36	NGC 1912			Open cluster	Auriga	7.4
Mel 37	NGC 1960			Open cluster	Auriga	6.3
Mel 38	NGC 2099			Open cluster	Auriga	6.2
Mel 39	NGC 2126			Open cluster	Auriga	10.2
Mel 40	NGC 2158			Open cluster	Gemini	8.6
Mel 41	NGC 2168			Open cluster	Gemini	5.1
Mel 42	NGC 2192			Open cluster	Auriga	10.9
Mel 43	NGC 2194			Open cluster	Orion	8.5
Mel 44	NGC 2204			Open cluster	Canis Major	8.6
Mel 45	NGC 2215			Open cluster	Monoceros	8.5
Mel 46	NGC 2243			Open cluster	Canis Major	9.4
Mel 47	NGC 2244	Satellite Cluster		Open cluster	Monoceros	4.8
Mel 48	NGC 2259			Open cluster	Monoceros	10.8
Mel 49	NGC 2264	Christmas Tree Cluster		Open cluster	Monoceros	3.9
Mel 50	NGC 2266			Open cluster	Gemini	9.5
Mel 51	NGC 2281			Open cluster	Auriga	7.2
Mel 52	NGC 2287			Open cluster	Canis Major	5.0
Mel 53	NGC 2298			Globular cluster	Puppis	9.3
Mel 54	NGC 2301			Open cluster	Monoceros	6.3
Mel 55	NGC 2304			Open cluster	Gemini	10.0
Mel 56	NGC 2309			Open cluster	Monoceros	10.5
Mel 57	NGC 2314			Galaxy	Camelopardalis	12.2
Mel 58	NGC 2323			Open cluster	Monoceros	7.2
Mel 59	NGC 2324			Open cluster	Monoceros	7.9
Mel 60	NGC 2335			Open cluster	Monoceros	9.3
Mel 61	NGC 2345			Open cluster	Canis Major	8.1
Mel 62	NGC 2353			Open cluster	Monoceros	7.1
Mel 63	NGC 2355			Open cluster	Gemini	9.7
Mel 64	NGC 2360	Caroline's Cluster		Open cluster	Canis Major	9.1
Mel 65	NGC 2362	Tau Canis Majoris Cluster		Open cluster	Canis Major	3.8
Mel 66	-			Open cluster	Puppis	7.8
Mel 67	NGC 2421			Open cluster	Puppis	9.0
Mel 68	NGC 2422			Open cluster	Puppis	4.3
Mel 69	NGC 2420			Open cluster	Gemini	10.0
Mel 70	NGC 2423			Open cluster	Puppis	7.0
Mel 71	-			Open cluster	Puppis	7.1
Mel 72	-			Open cluster	Monoceros	10.1
Mel 73	NGC 2432			Open cluster	Puppis	10.2
Mel 74	NGC 2439			Open cluster	Puppis	7.1
Mel 75	NGC 2437			Open cluster	Puppis	6.6
Mel 76	NGC 2447			Open cluster	Puppis	6.5
Mel 77	NGC 2455			Open cluster	Puppis	10.2
Mel 78	NGC 2477			Open cluster	Puppis	5.7
Mel 79	NGC 2489			Open cluster	Puppis	9.3
Mel 80	NGC 2506			Open cluster	Monoceros	8.9
Mel 81	NGC 2509			Open cluster	Puppis	9.3
Mel 82	NGC 2516	Southern Beehive Cluster		Open cluster	Carina	3.3
Mel 83	NGC 2539			Open cluster	Puppis	8.0
Mel 84	NGC 2547			Open cluster	Vela	5.0
Mel 85	NGC 2548			Open cluster	Hydra	5.5
Mel 86	NGC 2567			Open cluster	Puppis	8.4
Mel 87	NGC 2627			Open cluster	Pyxis	8.4
Mel 88	NGC 2632	Beehive Cluster		Open cluster	Cancer	3.9
Mel 89	NGC 2635			Open cluster	Pyxis	11.2
Mel 90	NGC 2658			Open cluster	Pyxis	9.2
Mel 91	NGC 2659			Open cluster	Vela	9.8
Mel 92	NGC 2660			Open cluster	Vela	8.8
Mel 93	NGC 2670			Open cluster	Vela	9.2
Mel 94	NGC 2682			Open cluster	Cancer	7.4
Mel 95	NGC 2808			Globular cluster	Carina	6.2
Mel 96	NGC 2818			Open cluster	Pyxis	9.9
Mel 97	IC 2488			Open cluster	Vela	7.4
Mel 98	NGC 3114			Open cluster	Carina	4.5
Mel 99	NGC 3201			Globular cluster	Vela	6.9
Mel 100	NGC 3293			Open cluster	Carina	6.2
Mel 101	-			Open cluster	Carina	8.0
Mel 102	IC 2602	Theta Carinae Cluster		Open cluster	Carina	1.6
Mel 103	NGC 3532	Wishing Well Cluster		Open cluster	Carina	3.4
Mel 104	IC 2714			Open cluster	Carina	8.2
Mel 105	-			Open cluster	Carina	8.5
Mel 106	NGC 3680			Open cluster	Centaurus	8.6
Mel 107	NGC 3766			Open cluster	Centaurus	4.6
Mel 108	NGC 3960			Open cluster	Centaurus	8.8
Mel 109	NGC 4103			Open cluster	Crux	7.4
Mel 110	NGC 4349			Open cluster	Crux	8.0
Mel 111	-	Coma Star Cluster		Open cluster	Coma Berenices	2.9
Mel 112	NGC 4372			Globular cluster	Musca	9.9
Mel 113	NGC 4590			Globular cluster	Hydra	9.7
Mel 114	NGC 4755	Jewel Box		Open cluster	Crux	4.2
Mel 115	NGC 4833			Globular cluster	Musca	7.8
Mel 116	NGC 4852			Open cluster	Centaurus	8.9
Mel 117	NGC 5024			Globular cluster	Coma Berenices	8.3
Mel 118	NGC 5139	Omega Centauri		Globular cluster	Centaurus	3.9
Mel 119	NGC 5272			Globular cluster	Canes Venatici	6.2
Mel 120	NGC 5281			Open cluster	Centaurus	5.9
Mel 121	NGC 5286			Globular cluster	Centaurus	7.6
Mel 122	NGC 5316			Open cluster	Centaurus	6.0
Mel 123	NGC 5460			Open cluster	Centaurus	5.6
Mel 124	NGC 5466			Globular cluster	Bootes	10.5
Mel 125	NGC 5617			Open cluster	Centaurus	6.3
Mel 126	NGC 5634			Globular cluster	Virgo	9.5
Mel 127	NGC 5662			Open cluster	Centaurus	7.7
Mel 128	NGC 5715			Open cluster	Circinus	9.8
Mel 129	IC 4499			Globular cluster	Apus	9.8
Mel 130	NGC 5822			Open cluster	Lupus	6.5
Mel 131	NGC 5823			Open cluster	Circinus	8.6
Mel 132	NGC 5897			Globular cluster	Libra	8.4
Mel 133	NGC 5904			Globular cluster	Serpens	5.7
Mel 134	NGC 5927			Globular cluster	Lupus	8.0
Mel 135	NGC 5946			Globular cluster	Norma	8.4
Mel 136	NGC 5986			Globular cluster	Lupus	7.6
Mel 137	NGC 5999			Open cluster	Norma	9.0
Mel 138	NGC 6005			Open cluster	Norma	10.7
Mel 139	NGC 6025			Open cluster	Triangulum Australe	6.0
Mel 140	NGC 6067			Open cluster	Norma	6.5
Mel 141	NGC 6087	S Normae Cluster		Open cluster	Norma	5.4
Mel 142	NGC 6093			Globular cluster	Scorpius	7.3
Mel 143	NGC 6101			Globular cluster	Apus	9.2
Mel 144	NGC 6121			Globular cluster	Scorpius	5.4
Mel 145	NGC 6124			Open cluster	Scorpius	6.3
Mel 146	NGC 6134			Open cluster	Norma	8.8
Mel 147	NGC 6144			Globular cluster	Scorpius	9.0
Mel 148	NGC 6171			Globular cluster	Ophiuchus	7.8
Mel 149	NGC 6192			Open cluster	Scorpius	8.5
Mel 150	NGC 6205	Hercules Globular Cluster		Globular cluster	Hercules	5.8
Mel 151	NGC 6218			Globular cluster	Ophiuchus	6.1
Mel 152	NGC 6222			Open cluster	Scorpius	10.1
Mel 153	NGC 6231			Open cluster	Scorpius	2.6
Mel 154	NGC 6235			Globular cluster	Ophiuchus	7.2
Mel 155	NGC 6242			Open cluster	Scorpius	6.4
Mel 156	NGC 6253			Open cluster	Ara	10.2
Mel 157	NGC 6254			Globular cluster	Ophiuchus	6.6
Mel 158	NGC 6259			Open cluster	Scorpius	8.0
Mel 159	NGC 6266			Globular cluster	Ophiuchus	6.4
Mel 160	NGC 6273			Globular cluster	Ophiuchus	6.8
Mel 161	NGC 6281			Open cluster	Scorpius	5.4
Mel 162	NGC 6284			Globular cluster	Ophiuchus	7.4
Mel 163	NGC 6287			Globular cluster	Ophiuchus	10.3
Mel 164	NGC 6293			Globular cluster	Ophiuchus	9.0
Mel 165	NGC 6304			Globular cluster	Ophiuchus	9.0
Mel 166	NGC 6318			Open cluster	Scorpius	11.8
Mel 167	NGC 6333			Globular cluster	Ophiuchus	7.8
Mel 168	NGC 6341			Globular cluster	Hercules	6.5
Mel 169	IC 4651			Open cluster	Ara	6.9
Mel 170	NGC 6352			Globular cluster	Ara	8.9
Mel 171	NGC 6356			Globular cluster	Ophiuchus	7.4
Mel 172	NGC 6362			Globular cluster	Ara	8.9
Mel 173	NGC 6366			Globular cluster	Ophiuchus	9.5
Mel 174	NGC 6388			Globular cluster	Scorpius	6.8
Mel 175	NGC 6402			Globular cluster	Ophiuchus	7.6
Mel 176	NGC 6397			Globular cluster	Ara	5.2
Mel 177	NGC 6400			Open cluster	Scorpius	8.8
Mel 178	NGC 6405	Butterfly Cluster		Open cluster	Scorpius	4.2
Mel 179	IC 4665			Open cluster	Ophiuchus	4.2
Mel 180	NGC 6441			Globular cluster	Scorpius	8.0
Mel 181	NGC 6451			Open cluster	Scorpius	8.2
Mel 182	NGC 6469			Open cluster	Sagittarius	8.2
Mel 183	NGC 6475	Ptolemy Cluster		Open cluster	Scorpius	3.3
Mel 184	NGC 6494			Open cluster	Sagittarius	5.9
Mel 185	NGC 6496			Globular cluster	Scorpius	8.6
Mel 186	-			Open cluster	Ophiuchus	3.0
Mel 187	NGC 6520			Open cluster	Sagittarius	7.6
Mel 188	NGC 6531			Open cluster	Sagittarius	5.9
Mel 189	NGC 6535			Globular cluster	Serpens	10.0
Mel 190	NGC 6539			Globular cluster	Serpens	8.9
Mel 191	NGC 6541			Globular cluster	Corona Australis	7.3
Mel 192	NGC 6544			Globular cluster	Sagittarius	9.9
Mel 193	NGC 6553			Globular cluster	Sagittarius	8.3
Mel 194	NGC 6558			Globular cluster	Sagittarius	11.3
Mel 195	NGC 6569			Globular cluster	Sagittarius	9.5
Mel 196	NGC 6584			Globular cluster	Telescopium	8.2
Mel 197	NGC 6603			Open cluster	Sagittarius	11.1
Mel 198	NGC 6611			Open cluster	Serpens	6.0
Mel 199	NGC 6624			Globular cluster	Sagittarius	9.1
Mel 200	NGC 6626			Globular cluster	Sagittarius	6.9
Mel 201	NGC 6633			Open cluster	Ophiuchus	4.6
Mel 202	NGC 6637			Globular cluster	Sagittarius	8.3
Mel 203	NGC 6642			Globular cluster	Sagittarius	10.2
Mel 204	IC 4725			Open cluster	Sagittarius	4.6
Mel 205	NGC 6645			Open cluster	Sagittarius	8.5
Mel 206	NGC 6649			Open cluster	Scutum	8.9
Mel 207	NGC 6652			Globular cluster	Sagittarius	9.8
Mel 208	NGC 6656			Globular cluster	Sagittarius	5.2
Mel 209	NGC 6664			Open cluster	Scutum	7.8
Mel 210	IC 4756			Open cluster	Serpens	4.6
Mel 211	NGC 6681			Globular cluster	Sagittarius	7.8
Mel 212	NGC 6694			Open cluster	Scutum	8.0
Mel 213	NGC 6705	Wild Duck Cluster		Open cluster	Scutum	5.8
Mel 214	NGC 6709			Open cluster	Aquila	6.7
Mel 215	NGC 6712			Globular cluster	Scutum	8.7
Mel 216	NGC 6715			Globular cluster	Sagittarius	7.7
Mel 217	NGC 6723			Globular cluster	Sagittarius	8.0
Mel 218	NGC 6752	Great Peacock Globular		Globular cluster	Pavo	5.4
Mel 219	NGC 6760			Globular cluster	Aquila	9.8
Mel 220	NGC 6779			Globular cluster	Lyra	8.4
Mel 221	NGC 6809			Globular cluster	Sagittarius	6.3
Mel 222	NGC 6811			Open cluster	Cygnus	6.8
Mel 223	NGC 6819			Open cluster	Cygnus	7.3
Mel 224	NGC 6830			Open cluster	Vulpecula	7.9
Mel 225	NGC 6834			Open cluster	Cygnus	7.8
Mel 226	NGC 6838			Globular cluster	Sagitta	8.4
Mel 227	-			Open cluster	Octans	5.3
Mel 228	NGC 6864			Globular cluster	Sagittarius	8.6
Mel 229	NGC 6866			Globular cluster	Cygnus	7.6
Mel 230	NGC 6934			Globular cluster	Delphinus	8.9
Mel 231	NGC 6939			Open cluster	Cepheus	7.8
Mel 232	NGC 6940			Open cluster	Vulpecula	6.3
Mel 233	NGC 6981			Globular cluster	Aquarius	9.2
Mel 234	NGC 7078			Globular cluster	Pegasus	6.3
Mel 235	NGC 7089			Globular cluster	Aquarius	6.6
Mel 236	NGC 7092			Open cluster	Cygnus	4.6
Mel 237	NGC 7099			Globular cluster	Capricornus	6.9
Mel 238	NGC 7209			Open cluster	Lacerta	7.7
Mel 239	IC 1434			Open cluster	Lacerta	9.0
Mel 240	NGC 7243			Open cluster	Lacerta	6.4
Mel 241	NGC 7245			Open cluster	Lacerta	9.2
Mel 242	NGC 7492			Globular cluster	Aquarius	10.5
Mel 243	NGC 7654			Open cluster	Cassiopeia	6.9
Mel 244	NGC 7762			Open cluster	Cepheus	10.0
Mel 245	NGC 7789	Caroline's Rose, White Rose Cluster		Open cluster	Cassiopeia	6.7

== Errors ==
There are some errors in Melotte's list:

- Mel 28 and 29 are asterisms.
- The elliptical or lenticular galaxy Mel 57 was mistaken for a globular cluster.

== See also ==
- List of astronomical catalogues
- Collinder catalogue - a similar catalogue of open star clusters published by Per Collinder in 1931.
- Trumpler catalogue - a similar catalogue of open star clusters published by Robert Julius Trumpler in 1930.
