= Sufi Observing Competition =

Messier marathon

Official logo of the Sufi Observing Competition

Sufi Observing Competition is an international competition and like Messier marathon, but more difficult with various subjects.

Since 2006, Astronomical Society of Iran – Amateur Committee (ASIAC) holds an international observing competition in the memory of Azophi. The first competition was held in 2006 in the north of Semnan Province and the 2nd SUFI observing competition was held in summer of 2008 in Ladiz near Zahedan. More than 100 observers from Iran and Iraq participated in this event.

Third Sufi Competition was held in Pasargadae, Fars province of Iran, at the enclosure of the historical tomb of Cyrus the Great on 17–20 August 2009. More than 120 amateur astronomers participated in this competition which held in 2 class of individuals and groups. Closing ceremony of 3rd Sufi Competition was held in Persepolis historical site splendidly which is in the list of UNESCO World Heritage Site.

Babak Amin Tafreshi, Pouria Nazemi, Kazem Kookaram and Mohammad H. Almasi are Iranian amateur astronomers who designed and manage this competition in their country until today.

== Objects selected by the competition ==
Number	Name of Object	Object Type	Constellation	Recommended Instrument	Object of Sufi
1	M7	Open cluster	Sco	Telescope - Binoculars	*
2	M6	Open cluster	Sco	Telescope - Binoculars	
3	Lagoon Nebula	Star cluster with Nebulae	Sgr	Telescope - Binoculars	
4	Trifid Nebula	Star cluster with Nebulae	Sgr	Telescope - Binoculars	
5	M22	Globular cluster	Sgr	Telescope - Binoculars	
6	M62	Globular cluster	Oph	Telescope - Binoculars	
7	M80	Globular cluster	Sco	Telescope - Binoculars	
8	NGC 6231	Open cluster	Sco	Telescope - Binoculars	
9	NGC 6281	Open cluster	Sco	Telescope - Binoculars	
10	NGC 6541	Globular cluster	CrA	Telescope - Binoculars	
11	NGC 6441	Globular cluster	Sco	Telescope - Binoculars	
12	Black Eye Galaxy	Galaxy	Com	Telescope - Binoculars	
13	Owl Nebula	Planetary nebula	UMa	Telescope - Binoculars	
14	M108	Galaxy	UMa	Telescope - Binoculars	
15	M108	Galaxy	UMa	Telescope - Binoculars	
16	M109	Galaxy	UMa	Telescope - Binoculars	
17	M106	Galaxy	CVn	Telescope - Binoculars	
18	M94	Galaxy	CVn	Telescope - Binoculars	
19	Sunflower Galaxy	Galaxy	CVn	Telescope - Binoculars	
20	Whirlpool Galaxy	Galaxy	CVn	Telescope - Binoculars	
21	Pinwheel Galaxy	Galaxy	UMa	Telescope - Binoculars	
22	M3	Globular cluster	CVn	Telescope - Binoculars	
23	M3	Globular cluster	CVn	Telescope - Binoculars	
24	M5	Globular cluster	Ser	Telescope - Binoculars	
25	M81	Galaxy	UMa	Telescope - Binoculars	
26	M82	Galaxy	UMa	Telescope - Binoculars	
27	M102	Galaxy	Dra	Telescope - Binoculars	
28	NGC 5907	Galaxy	Dra	Telescope - Binoculars	
29	NGC 6946	Galaxy	Cep	Telescope - Binoculars	
30	M39	Open cluster	Cyg	Telescope - Binoculars	
31	NGC 7243	Open cluster	Lac	Telescope - Binoculars	
32	NGC 7331	Galaxy	Peg	Telescope - Binoculars	
33	M12	Globular cluster	Oph	Telescope - Binoculars	
34	M9	Globular cluster	Oph	Telescope - Binoculars	
35	M28	Globular cluster	Sgr	Telescope - Binoculars	
36	M54	Globular cluster	Sgr	Telescope - Binoculars	
37	M55	Globular cluster	Sgr	Telescope - Binoculars	
38	M23	Open cluster	Sgr	Telescope - Binoculars	
39	16	Open cluster	Sgr	Telescope - Binoculars	
40	Omega Nebula	Bright nebula	Sgr	Telescope - Binoculars	
41	M25	Open cluster	Sgr	Telescope - Binoculars	
42	asterism of Nu1 and Nu2	asterism	Sgr	Telescope - Binoculars	*
43	NGC 6716	Open cluster	Sgr	Telescope - Binoculars	
44	M14	Globular cluster	Oph	Telescope - Binoculars	
45	IC 4665	Open cluster	Oph	Binoculars	
46	IC 4756	Open cluster	Ser	Binoculars	
47	Wild Duck Cluster	Open cluster	Sct	Telescope - Binoculars	
48	M26	Open cluster	Sct	Telescope - Binoculars	
49	NGC 6712	Globular cluster	Sct	Telescope - Binoculars	
49	M75	Globular cluster	Sgr	Telescope - Binoculars	
50	Andromeda Galaxy	Galaxy	And	Telescope - Binoculars	
51	M110	Elliptical galaxy	And	Telescope - Binoculars	
52	NGC 185	Galaxy	Cas	Telescope - Binoculars	
53	M52	Open cluster	Cas	Telescope - Binoculars	
54	NGC 40	planetary Nebula	Cep	Telescope -	
55	NGC 7789	Open cluster	Cas	Telescope - Binoculars	
56	NGC 129	Open cluster	Cas	Telescope - Binoculars	
57	NGC 457	Open cluster	Cas	Telescope - Binoculars	
58	NGC 663	Open cluster	Cas	Telescope - Binoculars	
59	M13	Globular cluster	Her	Telescope - Binoculars	
60	M92	Globular cluster	Her	Telescope - Binoculars	
61	NGC 6229	Globular cluster	Her	Telescope - Binoculars	
62	NGC 6503	Galaxy	Dra	Telescope - Binoculars	
63	M72	Globular cluster	Aqr	Telescope - Binoculars	
64	NGC 7009	Planetary Nebula	Aqr	Telescope -	
65	M30	Globular cluster	Cap	Telescope - Binoculars	
66	NGC 7293	Planetary Nebula	Aqr	Telescope - Binoculars	
67	M74	Galaxy	Psc	Telescope - Binoculars	
68	Triangulum Galaxy	Galaxy	Tri	Telescope - Binoculars	
69	NGC 752	Open cluster	And	Telescope - Binoculars	
70	Little Dumbbell Nebula	Planetary Nebula	Per	Telescope	
71	NGC 869 and NGC 884	Open clusters	Per	Telescope - Binoculars	*
72	NGC 891	Galaxy	And	Telescope - Binoculars	
73	M34	Open cluster	Per	Telescope - Binoculars	
74	NGC 1023	Galaxy	Per	Telescope - Binoculars	
75	Brocchi's Cluster	Open cluster	Vul	Telescope - Binoculars	*
76	Messier 71	Globular cluster	Sge	Telescope - Binoculars	
77	Dumbbell Nebula	Planetary Nebula	Vul	Telescope - Binoculars	
78	NGC 6934	Globular cluster	Del	Telescope - Binoculars	
79	Ring Nebula	Planetary Nebula	Lyr	Telescope	
80	M29	Open cluster	Cyg	Telescope - Binoculars	
81	NGC 7582	Galaxy	Gru	Telescope - Binoculars	
82	NGC 55	Galaxy	Scl	Telescope - Binoculars	
83	NGC 300	Galaxy	Scl	Telescope - Binoculars	
84	NGC 7793	Galaxy	Scl	Telescope - Binoculars	
85	NGC 613	Galaxy	Scl	Telescope - Binoculars	
86	NGC 247	Galaxy	Cet	Telescope - Binoculars	
87	NGC 253	Galaxy	Scl	Telescope - Binoculars	
88	NGC 288	Globular cluster	Scl	Telescope - Binoculars	
89	Alpha Persei Cluster	Open cluster	Per	Binoculars	
90	NGC 1342	Open cluster	Per	Telescope - Binoculars	
91	NGC 1502	Open cluster	Cam	Telescope - Binoculars	
92	NGC 1528	Open cluster	Per	Telescope - Binoculars	
93	NGC 246	Planetary Nebula	Cet	Telescope - Binoculars	
94	NGC 936	Galaxy	Cet	Telescope - Binoculars	
95	M77	Galaxy	Cet	Telescope - Binoculars	
96	Pleiades	Open cluster	Tau	Telescope - Binoculars	
97	NGC 1746	Open cluster	Tau	Telescope - Binoculars	
98	NGC 1746	Open cluster	Tau	Binoculars	
99	NGC 1907	Open cluster	Aur	Telescope - Binoculars	
100	M38	Open cluster	Aur	Telescope - Binoculars	
101	M36	Open cluster	Aur	Telescope - Binoculars	
102	M37	Open cluster	Aur	Telescope - Binoculars	
103	Crab Nebula	Supernova remnant	Tau	Telescope - Binoculars	
104	M35	Open cluster	Gem	Telescope - Binoculars	
105	NGC 2158	Open cluster	Gem	Telescope - Binoculars	
106	NGC 2403	Galaxy	Cam	Telescope - Binoculars	
107	M2	Globular cluster	Aqr	Telescope - Binoculars	
108	M15	Globular cluster	Peg	Telescope - Binoculars	
109	Orion Nebula	Nebula	Ori	Telescope - Binoculars	
110	M78	Nebula	Ori	Telescope - Binoculars	
111	NGC 2244	Open cluster	Mon	Telescope - Binoculars	
112	NGC 2264	Cluster with Nebula	Mon	Telescope - Binoculars	
113	NGC 1097	Galaxy	For	Telescope - Binoculars	
114	NGC 1360	Galaxy	For	Telescope - Binoculars	
115	NGC 1365	Galaxy	For	Telescope - Binoculars	
116	NGC 1316	Galaxy	For	Telescope - Binoculars	
117	NGC 1291	Galaxy	Eri	Telescope - Binoculars	
118	M79	Globular cluster	Lep	Telescope - Binoculars	
119	Eskimo Nebula	Planetary Nebula	Gem	Telescope	
120	M50	Open cluster	Mon	Telescope - Binoculars	
121	M41	Open cluster	Cma	Telescope - Binoculars	
122	Beehive Cluster	Open cluster	Cnc	Telescope - Binoculars	
123	M67?	Open cluster	Cnc	Telescope - Binoculars	
124	Asterism of lambda	Open cluster	Ori	Telescope - Binoculars	*

== See also ==
- Abd al-Rahman al-Sufi
- Messier marathon
- Star party
