= NGC 6664 =

Open cluster in the constellation Scutum

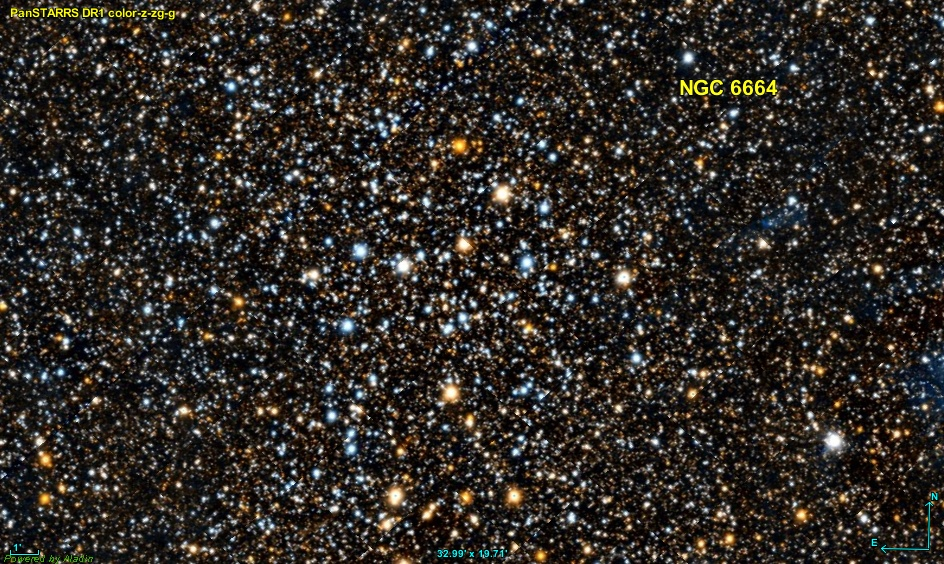
- NGC 6664

Observation data
- Right ascension: 18h 37m 56s
- Declination: -08° 11’ 52”
- Distance: 4892 ly (1.5kpc)
- Apparent magnitude (V): 7.8
- Apparent dimensions (V): 12′

Physical characteristics
- Mass: 2000 M_{☉}
- Estimated age: 20 million years
- Other designations: OCL 68, C 1834-082, Herschel 354, Melotte 209, Cr 385, Santa's Sleigh Cluster, Teacup Cluster

Associations
- Constellation: Scutum

NGC 6664, also known as Santa's Sleigh or the Teacup Cluster, is an open cluster in Scutum. It has a magnitude of 7.8, and is visible with binoculars or a small telescope under good conditions. It is located near NGC 6649. Due to its location in the galactic plane, it can be difficult to distinguish from the fainter background stars. It is located nearby to the much brighter star Alpha Scuti.

It was discovered on June 16, 1784 by William Herschel, and later observed by his son, John Herschel. NGC 6664 is home to 16 Cepheid variable stars. 11 are B type, the remaining five are red giants.

NGC 6664 contains the yellow supergiant EV Scuti, which is also classified a cepheid variable.
