= IC 2714 =

Open cluster in the constellation of Carina

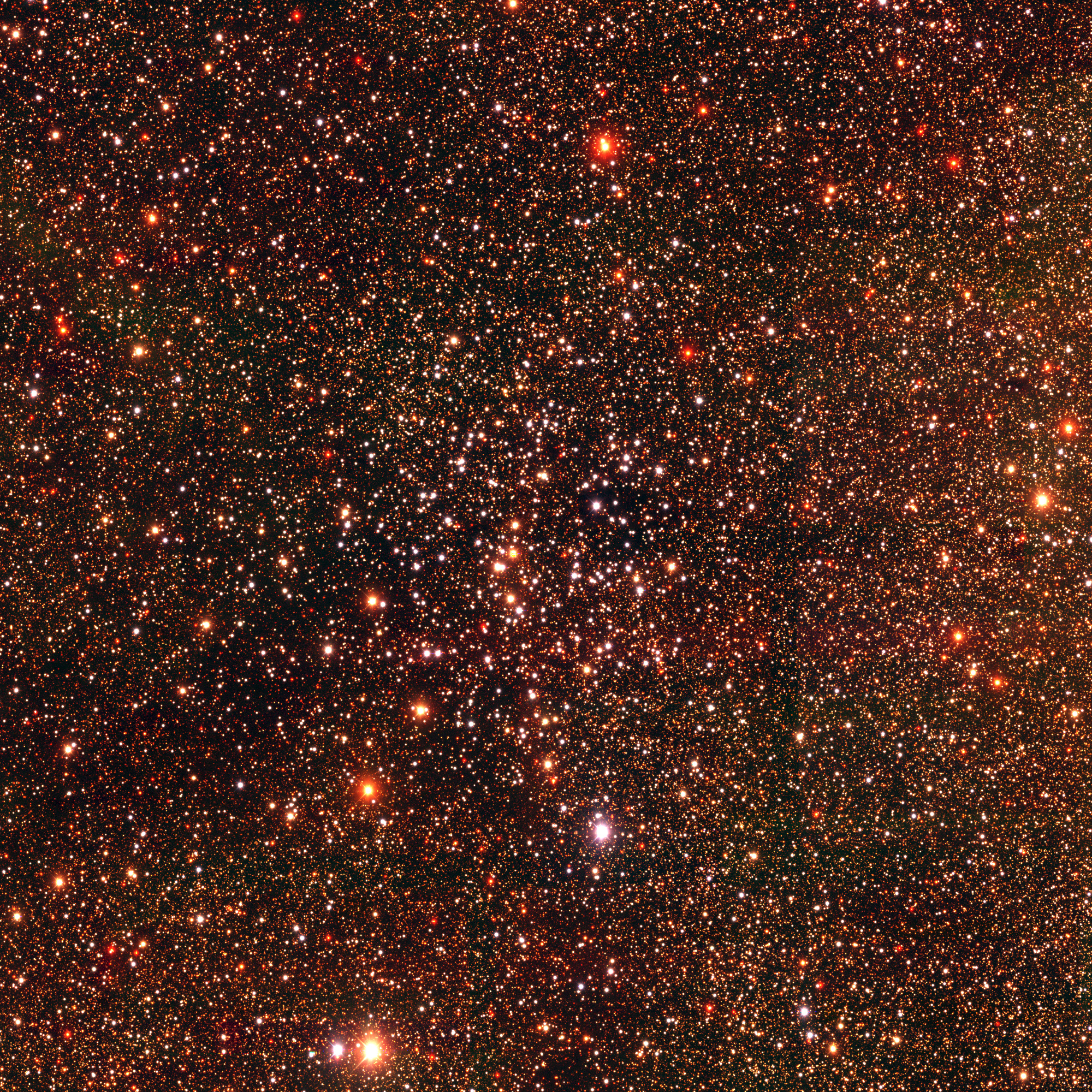

Observation data (J2000 epoch)
- Right ascension: 11^{h} 17^{m} 27^{s}
- Declination: −62° 44′ 00″
- Distance: 4,030 ly (1,238 pc)
- Apparent magnitude (V): 8.2
- Apparent dimensions (V): 12'

Physical characteristics
- Mass: 170 M_{☉}
- Estimated age: 350 million years
- Other designations: Collinder 245, Melotte 104, vdBH 116

Associations
- Constellation: Carina

IC 2714, also known as the Rip-Torn Cluster, is an open cluster in the constellation Carina. It was discovered by James Dunlop in 1826. It is located approximately 4,000 light years away from Earth, in the Carina–Sagittarius Arm.

== Characteristics ==
It is a rich to moderately rich, intermediate-brightness, detached cluster with Trumpler type II2r or II3m. There are 494 probable member stars within the angular radius of the cluster and 215 within the central part of the cluster. The tidal radius of the cluster is 6.3 - 8.7 parsecs (21 - 28 light years) and represents the average outer limit of IC 2714, beyond which a star is unlikely to remain gravitationally bound to the cluster core. The core of the cluster is estimated to be 5.9 light years across.

The brightest stars of the cluster are of 11th magnitude and the brightest main sequence stars are of late B of A type. Two blue stragglers have been detected in the cluster, one variable star and eleven red giants. The turn-off mass of the cluster is estimated to be at 3.1 M_{☉}. The cluster has the same metallicity as the Sun.

== See also ==
- List of open clusters
- Open cluster family
- Open cluster remnant
