= NGC 2539 =

Open cluster in the constellation Puppis

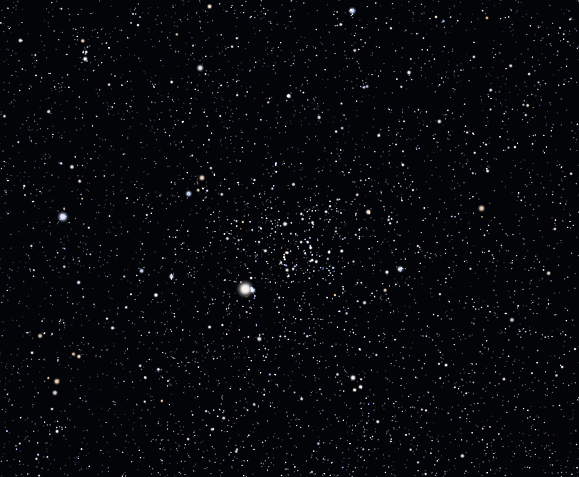
- NGC 2539

Observation data (J2000 epoch)
- Right ascension: 08^{h} 10^{m} 37^{s}
- Declination: −12° 49′ 06″
- Distance: 4,440 ly (1,363 pc)
- Apparent magnitude (V): 6.5
- Apparent dimensions (V): 15′

Physical characteristics
- Mass: 5,480 M_{☉}
- Estimated age: 370 million years
- Other designations: Cr 176, Mel 83

Associations
- Constellation: Puppis

NGC 2539, also known as the Dish Cluster, is an open cluster of stars in the constellation of Puppis, located at the north edge of the constellation. It was discovered by German-British astronomer William Herschel on January 31, 1785. It is a moderately rich cluster and with little central concentration, having a Trumpler class of II1m.

== Characteristics ==
The diameter of the cluster based on the location of possible members is estimated to be 7.4 parsecs (24 light years). The core radius of the cluster is 1.98 parsecs (6.5 light years), while the tidal radius is 15.2 parsecs (50 light years) and represents the average outer limit of NGC 2539, beyond which a star is unlikely to remain gravitationally bound to the cluster core. 151 stars, probable members of the cluster, are located within the central part of the cluster and 455 probable members are located within the angular radius of the cluster. 19 Puppis, visible near the edge of the cluster is a foreground star. The turn-off mass of the cluster is at 3.1 M_{☉}. The metallicity of the cluster is 0.14, higher than the solar one. The age of the cluster has been estimated to be as high as 630 myrs.

Mermilliod and Mayor studied 11 red giants within the cluster, the brightest of which was mag 9.509 and of spectral type K5I-II, and two non-members. Three of this stars were found to be spectrographic binaries, while further studies indicated that one of them is a triple system. Two more are suspected double stars. Further studies revealed seven variable stars, 5 eclipsing binaries, one delta Scuti variable and one gamma Doradus variable, with the gamma Doratus variable star membership being questionable. From the eclipsing binaries, one is field star and in a further study one more eclipsing binary (specifically a W Ursae Majoris variable) was found to lie at the background.
