= NGC 1817 =

Open cluster in the constellation Taurus

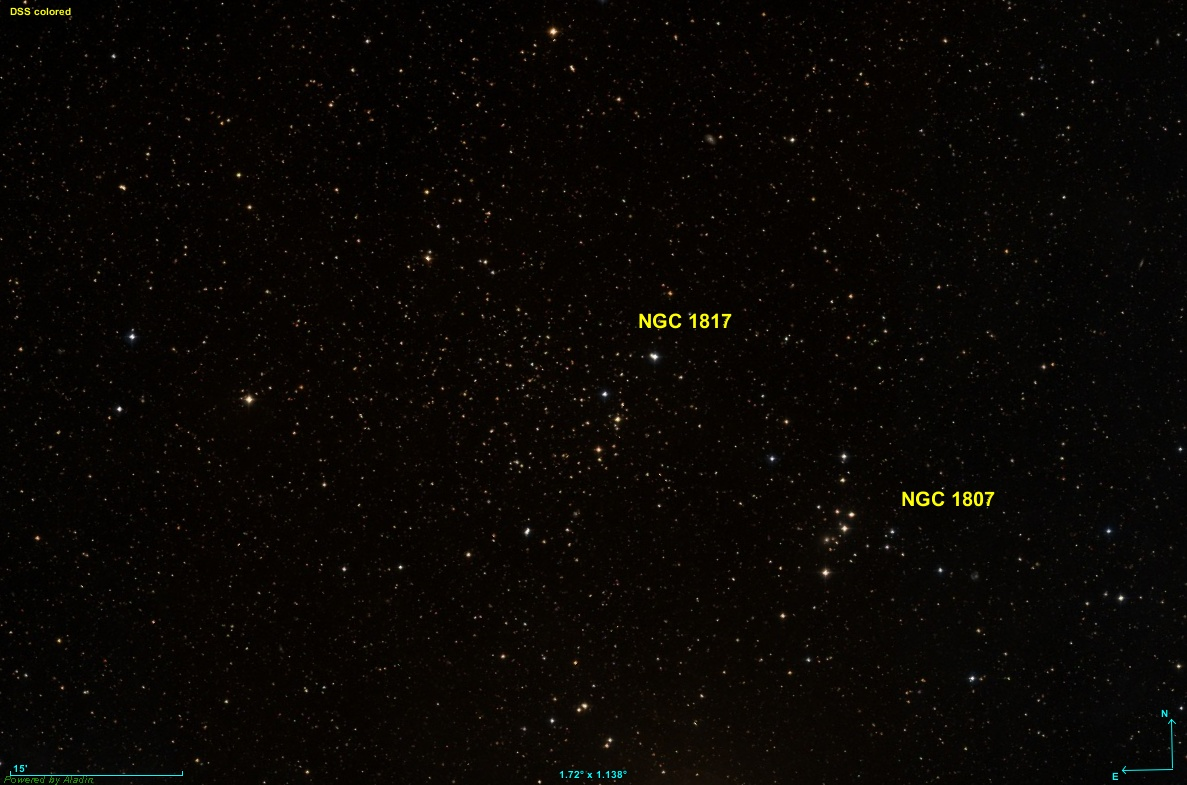
- NGC 1817 as seen by the DSS

Observation data (J2000 epoch)
- Right ascension: 05^{h} 12^{m} 15.(0)^{s}
- Declination: +16° 41′ 2(4)″
- Distance: 6,430 ly (1,972 pc)
- Apparent magnitude (V): 7.7
- Apparent dimensions (V): 20′

Physical characteristics
- Estimated age: 0.8−1.2 Gyr
- Other designations: C 0509+166, Collinder 60

Associations
- Constellation: Taurus

NGC 1817 is an open cluster of stars in the constellation of Taurus. It was discovered by German-English astronomer William Herschel in February 1784. With an apparent magnitude of 7.7 and spanning 20 arc minutes across the sky, it is separated from the NGC 1807 cluster by just 25 arc minutes. Indeed, the two may actually be parts of a single extended cluster.

The NGC 1817 cluster is around the same age as the Hyades, or perhaps a little younger at 0.8−1.2 billion years. The turnoff point for this cluster—where stars above a certain mass are evolving through the red giant stage—is twice the mass of the Sun. The cluster is situated in the opposite side of the sky from the Galactic Center at a separation of 32 kly (9.9 kpc) from the core, and is around 1.3 kly (0.4 kpc) away from the Galactic plane.

Measurements of the proper motion of 810 stars within a 1.5° region centered on the cluster suggest that it has at least 169 members. Of these, there is a total of 26 variable stars, including three candidate Gamma Doradus variable stars and sixteen Delta Scuti variables. This unusually high proportion of Delta Scuti variables is likely the result of the turnoff point being located within the instability strip.

== Gallery ==
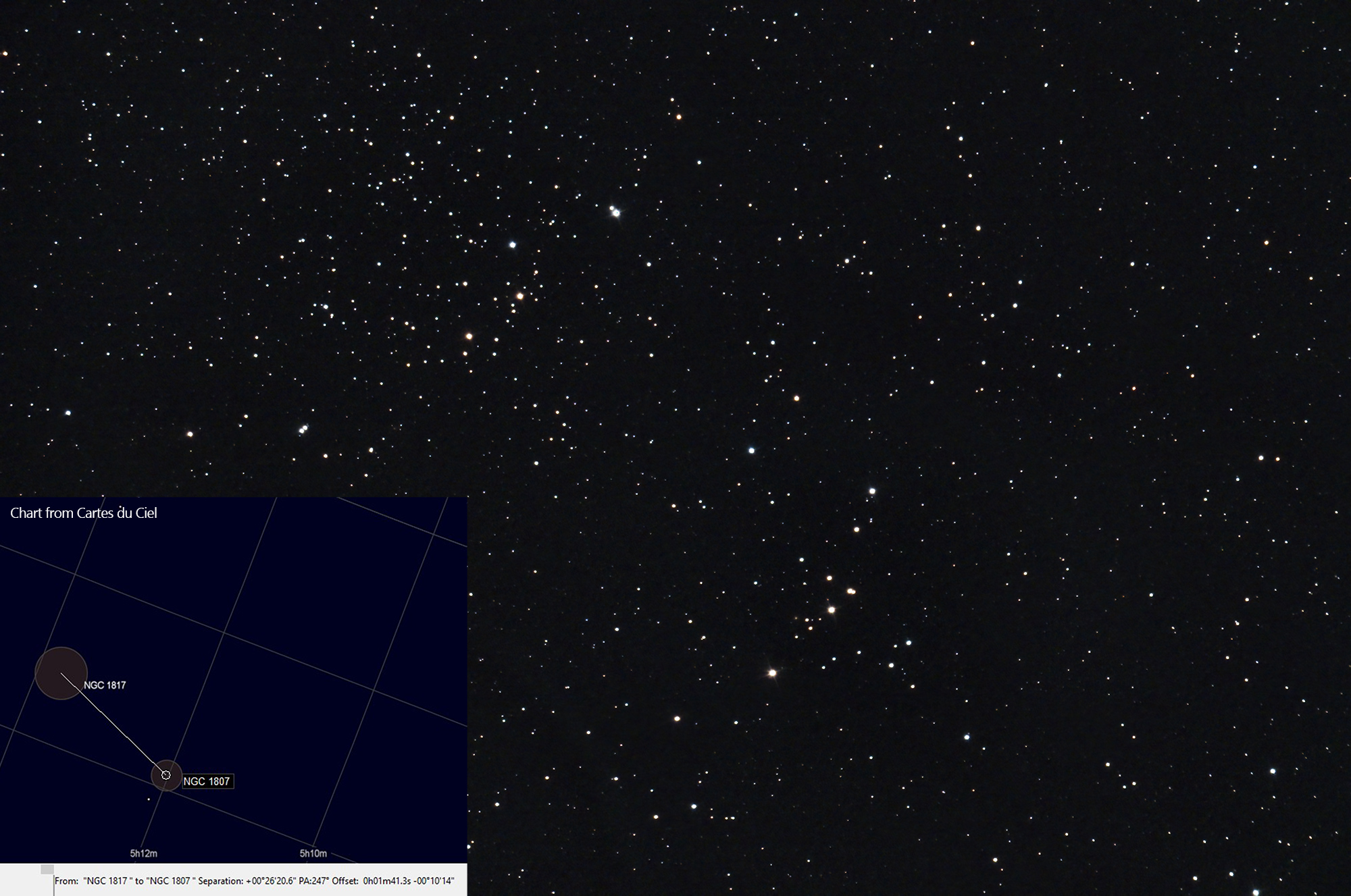
Open clusters NGC 1807 and 1817 showing separation of 26'
