= NGC 2420 =

Open cluster in the constellation Gemini

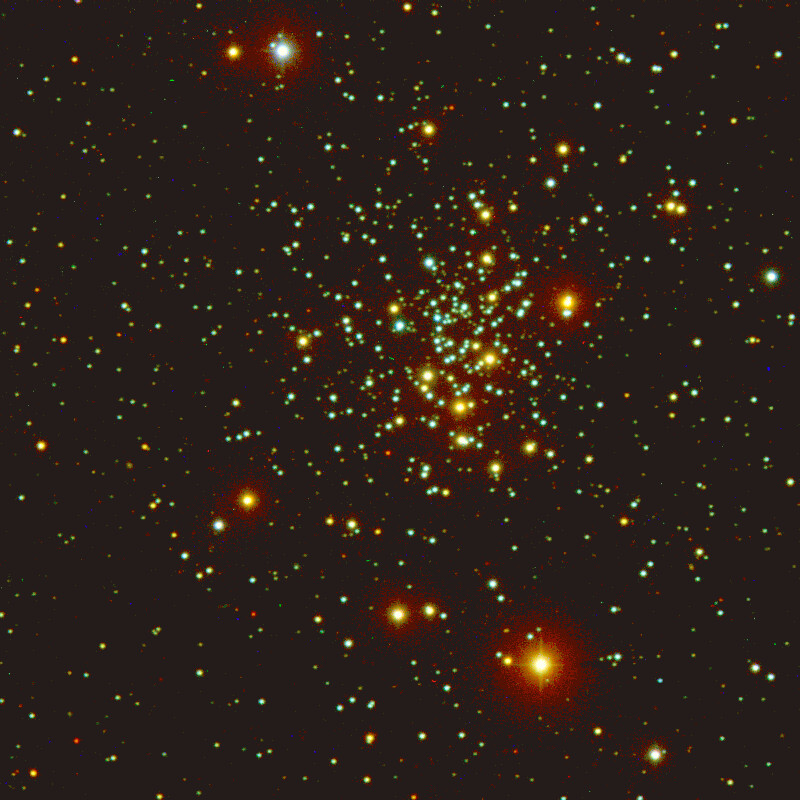
- NGC 2420 by the refurbished WIYN 0.9-meter telescope at Kitt Peak National Observatory

Observation data (J2000 epoch)
- Right ascension: 07^{h} 38^{m} 25^{s}
- Declination: +21° 34′ 30″
- Distance: 10,060 ly (3,085 pc)
- Apparent magnitude (V): 8.3
- Apparent dimensions (V): 6′

Physical characteristics
- Estimated age: 2 billion years
- Other designations: Melotte 69, Collinder 154

Associations
- Constellation: Gemini

NGC 2420 is an open cluster of stars in the constellation of Gemini. It was discovered by German-British astronomer William Herschel on 19 November 1783. The cluster is about two billion years old and it is located 10,000 light years away.

== Observation ==
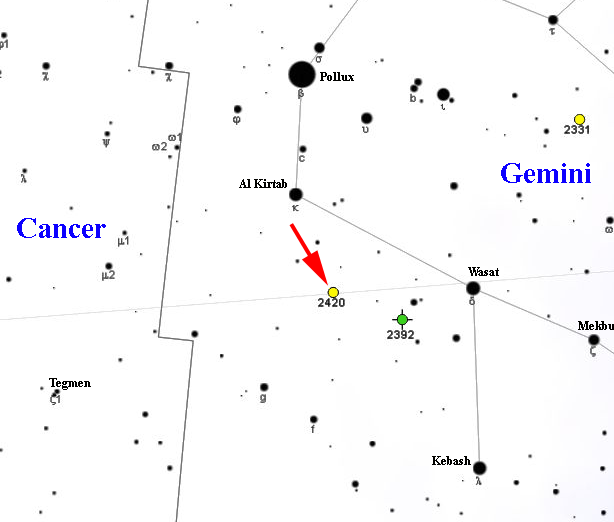
The location of NGC 2420

NGC 2420 lies about 6,5 degrees south-southeast of the star Pollux and a bit over two degrees east-northeast of the Eskimo Nebula. Through a small telescope at low magnification it appears as a uniform ghostly light that gets brighter to the centre, similar to a tail-less comet and at x33 magnification some individual stars can be glimpsed with averted vision. At higher magnification the cluster is resolved into a rich field of individual stars. It is included in the Herschel 400 Catalogue.

== Characteristics ==
The cluster is located at a greater distance from the galactic centre than the Sun, lying in the direction of the galactic anti-centre, and lies 19° above the galactic plane, which corresponds to a distance of 3,000 light years. It has a Trumpler classification of I1r, indicating a rich detached cluster with a central concentration made out of stars of similar apparent magnitude. Photographic photometry down to magnitude 19 indicates that the cluster has over 500 members, with the brightest being of 11th magnitude. The total number of members is estimated to be around 1,000 within a diameter of 30 light years.

It is estimated that 41% of the stars of the cluster are binaries. The cluster has been found to contain two binary systems made out of two blue stragglers, while a third binary system is made out of a blue straggler and an extremely low mass white dwarf. These binary stars shine bright in far ultraviolet. Using data from the Hubble Space Telescope, von Hippel and Gilmore detected eight white dwarf candidates and estimated a cooling age of about 2 billion years.

The metallicity of the cluster has been a subject of many studies and has been found to be a bit sub-solar, with a metallicity of -0.26 according to WEBDA. The cluster was found to be a bit metal poor, with a [Fe/H] of -0.7 to -0.6 from spectrographic studies performed in the 1980s while subsequent CCD photometry indicates of a higher metallicity of about -0.30. Pancino et al. indicated a [Fe/H]= -0.05 ± 0.03 according to Pancino et al., which is close to the trend of metallicity descreasing with increasing distance from the galactic centre. The red giants of the cluster have a mean metallicity of −0.16 ± 0.04. Based on spectrographic data of the Gaia-ESO survey, the stars around the turnoff point have sub-solar metallicities but they increase for stars of smaller mass.

The stars of the cluster have homogenous CN and CH molecular band strengths. Similar low dispersion was observed in other elements.

== See also ==
- Messier 67 - a similar old open cluster
