= NGC 1807 =

Asterism in the constellations Orion and Taurus

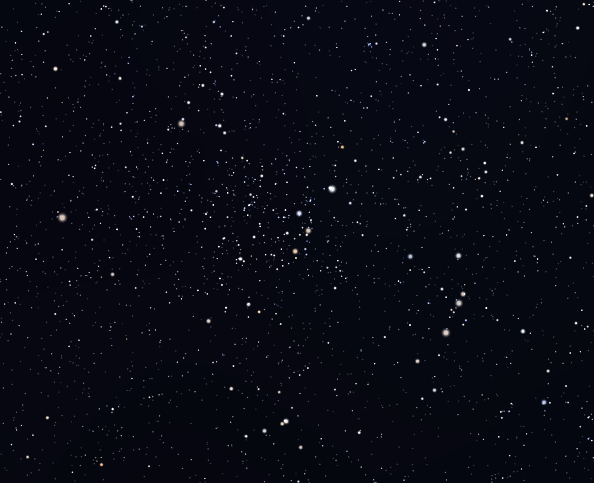
- NGC 1807 & NGC 1817 (taken from Stellarium)

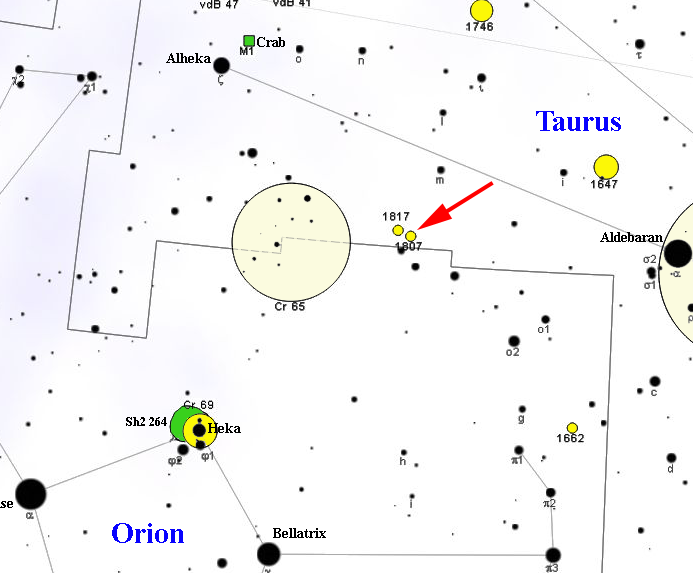
- Location map
- Object type: Asterism
- Other designations: Mel 29

Observation data (Epoch J2000.0)
- Constellation: Orion, Taurus
- Right ascension: 05^{h} 10.7^{m}
- Declination: +16° 32′
- Apparent magnitude: 7.86, 7
- Related media on Wikimedia Commons

NGC 1807 is an asterism at the border of the constellations Orion and Taurus near the open cluster NGC 1817. NGC 1807 has an apparent size of 5.4' and an apparent magnitude of 7.0. It is located toward the Galactic anticenter.
