= IC 2488 =

Open cluster in the constellation Vela

Observation data (J2000 epoch)
- Right ascension: 09^{h} 27^{m} 38^{s}
- Declination: −57° 00′ 00″
- Distance: 3,700 ly (1,134 pc)
- Apparent magnitude (V): 7.4
- Apparent dimensions (V): 15'

Physical characteristics
- Mass: 410 M_{☉}
- Estimated age: 280 million years
- Other designations: Collinder 208, Melotte 97, vdBH 69

Associations
- Constellation: Vela

IC 2488, also known as the Strings of Pearls Cluster or Hoopskirt Cluster, is an open cluster in the constellation Vela. It was discovered by Nicolas-Louis de Lacaille in 1752. It is located approximately 3,700 light years away from Earth.

== Observation history ==
IC 2488 was discovered by Nicolas-Louis de Lacaille on January 25, 1752, during his trip to South Africa. He added it to his catalogue as Lacaille III.4. The cluster was also observed by James Dunlop in 1826. He described it as "a faint cluster of [faint] stars of mixed magnitudes, with two or three stars pretty bright stars in it" and listed it as number 330 in his catalogue. He also noted that it could be 485 Argus, described by Bode. John Louis Emil Dreyer added it in 1908 in the Second Index Catalogue. For the catalogue, Dreyer used the coordinates obtained by Solon Bailey, who used photographic plates with the 24 inches Bruce telescope in Arequipa.

== Observation ==
IC 2488 lies 30 arcminutes west of N Velorum, a 3rd magnitude star located near the False Cross asterism. Stephen James O'Meara estimates the overall apparent magnitude of the cluster to be 6.0. The cluster is coarse. The cluster can be spotted with 7x50 binoculars and with a 4 inches telescope the cluster can be resolved in 30 stars in a northwest–southeast direction. The planetary nebula RCW 44 (also known as WRAY 17-31 or ESO 166–21) lies 51 arcminutes to northeast and is probably not related with the cluster. The brightest members of the cluster are of 10th magnitude.

== Characteristics ==
IC 2488 is an intermediate-richness, intermediate-brightness, detached cluster with Trumpler class II2m. There are 372 probable member stars within the angular radius of the cluster and 115 within the central part of the cluster. The tidal radius of the cluster is 9.0 - 11.6 parsecs (29 - 38 light years) and represents the average outer limit of IC 2488, beyond which a star is unlikely to remain gravitationally bound to the cluster core. The core of the cluster is estimated to be 9.3 light years across. Three blue stragglers have been detected in the cluster and at least three red giants are indisputable members of the cluster, one of which being a spectroscopic binary star.
