= NGC 2204 =

Open cluster in the constellation Canis Major

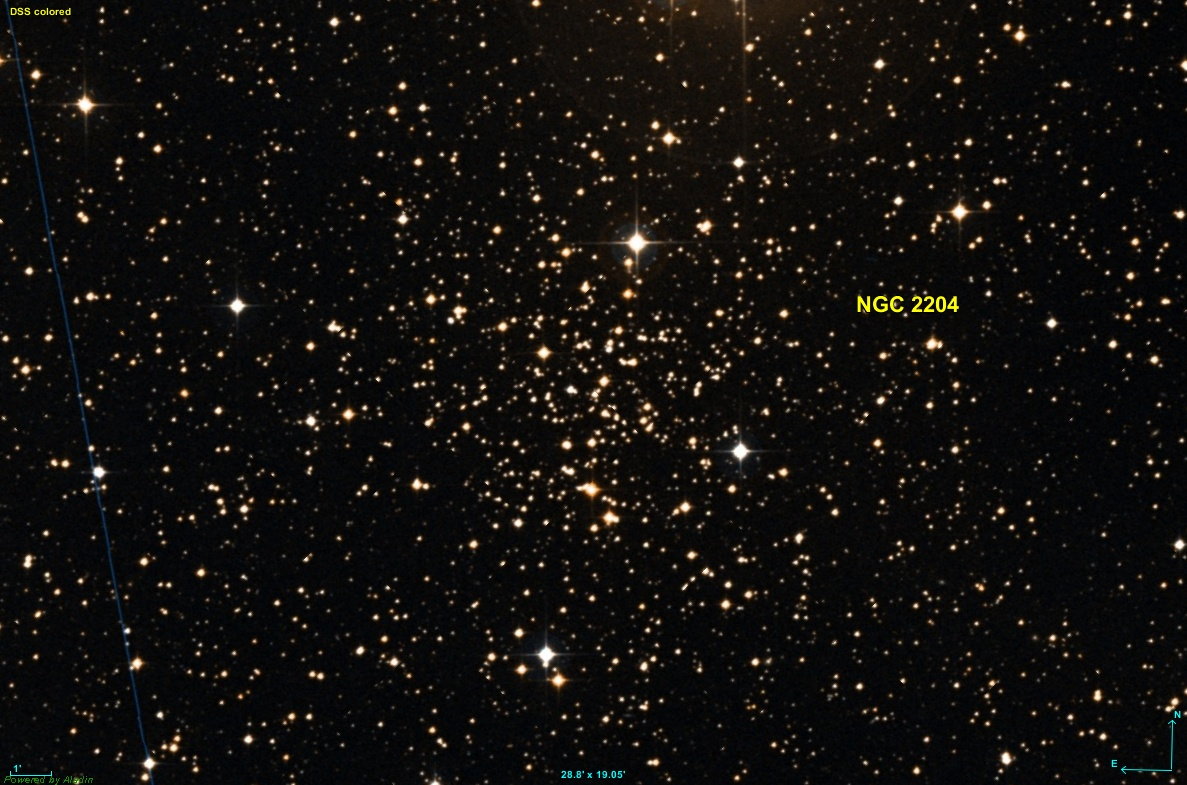
- NGC 2204, Digitized Sky Survey

Observation data (J2000.0 epoch)
- Right ascension: 06^{h} 15^{m} 31.7^{s}
- Declination: −18° 40′ 12″
- Distance: 13.4 ± 1.3 kly (4.1 ± 0.4 kpc)
- Apparent magnitude (V): 8.6
- Apparent dimensions (V): 10.0′

Physical characteristics
- Radius: 16.25ly
- Estimated age: 2.0±0.3 Gyr
- Other designations: Collinder 88, Melotte 44

Associations
- Constellation: Canis Major

NGC 2204 is an open cluster of stars in the constellation Canis Major. It was discovered by the German-English astronomer William Herschel on 6 February 1785. The cluster has an integrated visual magnitude of 8.6 and spans a diameter of 10.0′. Resolving the individual member stars is a challenge with a 10 to 12-inch amateur telescope. It is located at a distance of approximately 13,400 light years from the Sun. The cluster shows a mean radial velocity of +91.38±0.30 km/s relative to the Sun, and is orbiting the inner galactic disk region about 1 kpc below the galactic plane.

This is a rich but diffuse cluster with a Trumpler class of III 3m, spanning a physical diameter of about 55 ly (17 pc). It is an older cluster with an estimated age of 2.0±0.3 billion years. The metallicity is correspondingly poor, showing an abundance of iron about 59% of that in the Sun. There is a prominent giant branch clump on the HR diagram. The cluster has a significant population of blue stragglers, an indicator of past stellar mergers. It has a pair of candidate chemically peculiar stars, and five variable stars have been discovered, including four eclipsing variables.
