= NGC 5316 =

Open cluster in the constellation Centaurus

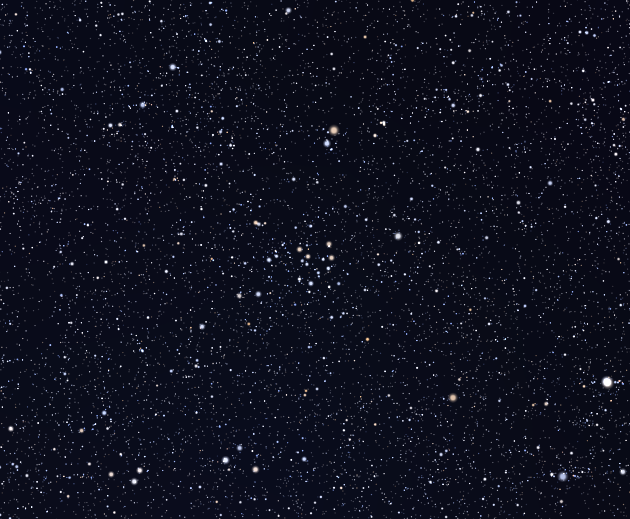
- NGC 5316

Observation data (J2000 epoch)
- Right ascension: 13^{h} 53^{m} 57^{s}
- Declination: −61° 52′ 06″
- Distance: 3,960 ly (1,215 pc)
- Apparent magnitude (V): 6.0
- Apparent dimensions (V): 15'

Physical characteristics
- Mass: 1,500 M_{☉}
- Estimated age: 100 million years
- Other designations: Collinder 279, Melotte 122

Associations
- Constellation: Centaurus

NGC 5316 is an open cluster in the constellation Centaurus. It was discovered by James Dunlop in 1826. Located approximately 4,000 light years away from Earth, it is located in the Carina-Sagittarius arm.

There are 570 probable member stars within the angular radius of the cluster and 262 within the central part of the cluster. The tidal radius of the cluster is 6.0 - 8.1 parsecs (19 - 26 light years) and represents the average outer limit of NGC 5316, beyond which a star is unlikely to remain gravitationally bound to the cluster core. The brightest member of the cluster (lucida) is star No. 31 (mag. 9.40). Star 31 has significantly more barium than the rest of the group and the Ba II line is visually stronger than the rest of the cluster. The turn-off mass of the cluster is estimated to be at 5.0 M_{☉}. The hottest stars of the cluster are of spectral type B5–B7. NGC 5316 has metallicity nearly the same as the solar one ([Fe/H] = −0.02 ± 0.05).

The age of the cluster has been estimated to be from as low as 51 myr (by the first photometric study of the cluster, in 1968, by Lindoff) to as high as 195 myr (by Battinelli & Capuzzo-Dolcetta, 1991). Pedreros et al. estimated its age to be (1.24 ± 0.15) × 10^{8} years from ZAMS fitting the cluster (Pedreros, 1987) and the UBVI CCD photometric study of the cluster by Carraro et al. estimated its age to be 100 ± 10 million years.
