= NGC 5617 =

Open cluster in the constellation Centaurus

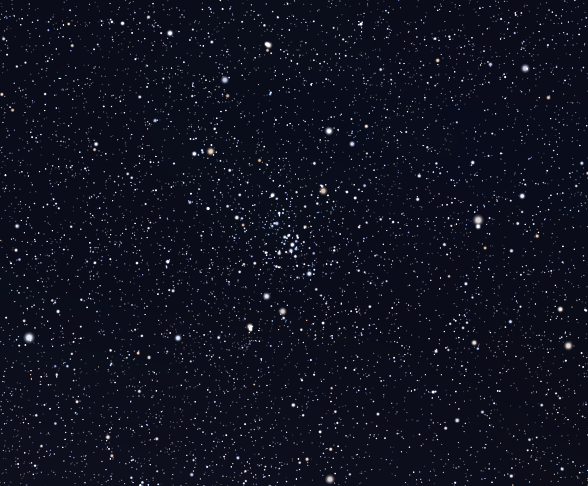
- NGC 5617 (taken with Stellarium)

Observation data (J2000 epoch)
- Right ascension: 14^{h} 29^{m} 44^{s}
- Declination: −60° 42′ 42″
- Distance: 5,770 ly (1,769 pc)
- Apparent magnitude (V): 6.3
- Apparent dimensions (V): 10'

Physical characteristics
- Estimated age: 82 Myr
- Other designations: Cr 282, Mel 125

Associations
- Constellation: Centaurus

NGC 5617, also known as the Dracula Cluster, is an open cluster in the constellation Centaurus. NGC 5617 forms a binary open cluster with Trumpler 22. It lies one degree west-northwest of Alpha Centauri.

== Observation history ==
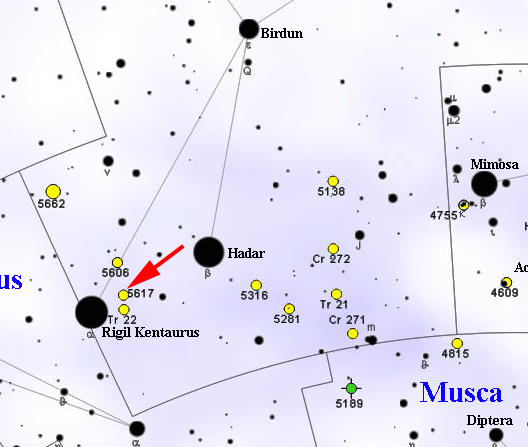
The location of NGC 5617 in the sky

It was discovered by James Dunlop in 1826. He described it on May 8, 1826, as "a cluster of small stars of mixed magnitudes, considerably congregated towards the centre, 4' or 5' in diametre" and added it to his catalog as number 302. John Herschel described as "Class IV object, very rich; irregularly round; pretty much compressed in the middle but scattered at borders; 15'; there are three stars of 10th magnitude, 5 or 6 stars of 11th magnitude; the rest below 11th" and added it to General Catalogue as No. 3570. In the New General Catalogue it is described as "large (10'), richer in stars to the west (about 80 total), with a compressed middle. It contains stars of magnitude 8 and fainter."

== Characteristics ==
NGC 5617 is located nearly 2 kpc (6.500 light years) away from Earth, at the further border of Carina-Sagittarius arm. Various photometric studies have produced different results concerning the age and the distance of the cluster; Moffat & Vogt (1975) studied and calculated a distance of 1.34 kpc from the Sun, Haug (1978) found its distance to be 1.82 kpc, a CCD photometry by Kjeldsen & Frandsen (1991) found the distance to be 2.05 ± 0.2 kpc and the age 70 Myr and Carra & Munari (2004) used BVI photometry to obtain reddening EB−V= 0.48 ± 0.05, age of 80 Myr, and a distance of 2.0 ± 0.3 kpc. De Silva et al. (2015) calculated its distance at 2.1 ± 0.3 kpc. Bisht et al. found an age of 90 ± 10 Myr and a parallax-derived distance of 2.43 ± 0.08 kpc, in good agreement with isochrone-derived values.

There are 175 probable member stars within the angular radius of the cluster and 65 within the central part of the cluster. The tidal radius of the cluster is 7.4 - 10.2 parsecs (24 - 33 light years) and represents the average outer limit of NGC 5617, beyond which a star is unlikely to remain gravitationally bound to the cluster core. One blue straggler is a possible member of the cluster. Other possible members of the cluster are delta Scuti variable, gamma Doradus variable and eclipsing variable stars.

NGC 5617, along with its companion Trumpler 22, appear to be dynamically relaxed, with massive stars concentrated near the center and less massive stars in the periphery.

=== Relation with Trumpler 22 ===
NGC 5617 appears to be gravitationally bound to Trumpler 22. The two clusters share similar radial velocities (-38.63 ± 2.25 km/s for NGC 5617 and -38.46 ± 2.08 km/s for Trumpler 22), mean metallicity (-0.18 ± 0.02 for NGC 5617 and-0.17 ± 0.04 for Trumpler 22), similar abundances across various elements, and have similar age, forming a primordial binary cluster pair. Their orbits were initially almost circular and their separation less than 20 pc.
