= NGC 2324 =

Open cluster in the constellation Monoceros

- Pan-STARRS image of NGC 2324

Observation data (J2000 epoch)
- Right ascension: 07^{h} 04^{m} 07.9^{s}
- Declination: +01° 02′ 46″
- Distance: 13.63 ± 0.78 kly (4.18 ± 0.24 kpc)
- Apparent magnitude (V): 8.4
- Apparent dimensions (V): 8′

Physical characteristics
- Estimated age: 790±150
- Other designations: NGC 2324, C 0701+011, Melotte 59

Associations
- Constellation: Monoceros

NGC 2324 is a well-studied open cluster of stars in the equatorial constellation of Monoceros. It is a faint aggregation that can be viewed using a moderate-sized telescope, looking to the northwest of the star Delta Monocerotis near the constellation border with Canis Minor. The cluster was discovered on December 27, 1786 by German-British astronomer William Herschel. It has an apparent visual magnitude of 8.4 and an angular size of 8′. NGC 2324 is located at a distance of approximately 13,600 ly from the Sun.

This cluster lies 35° from the galactic anticenter, and is currently 37,900 light-years (11.61 kpc) from the Galactic Center beyond the Perseus spiral arm. 852 high probability member stars have been identified. It has an estimated radius of 35.7 ± 2.1 ly and a tidal radius of 43.5 ly. Isochrone fitting provides an estimated age of 790 million years. The cluster has achieved dynamic equilibrium and has an estimated dissociation time of 382 million years from now.

Fourteen giant star candidates have been studied in NGC 2324, of which nine were confirmed as members. One blue straggler star has been identified. 29 suspected variable stars have been spotted in the field of NGC 2324.
