= NGC 2353 =

Open cluster in the constellation Monoceros

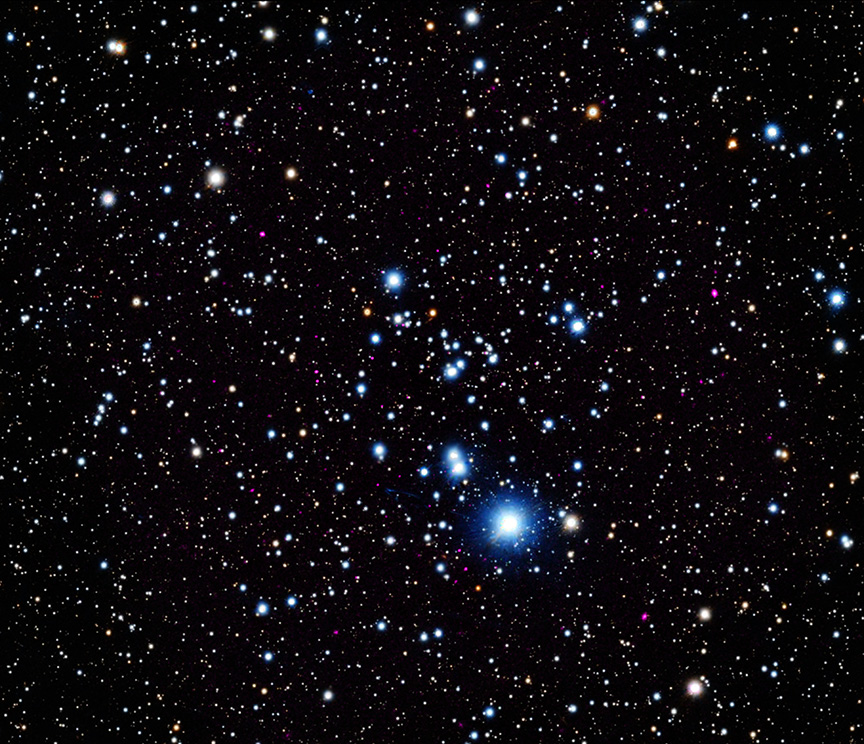
- NGC 2353 imaged by Chandra X-ray Observatory

Observation data (J2000.0 epoch)
- Right ascension: 07^{h} 14^{m} 30.0^{s}
- Declination: −10° 16′ 00″
- Distance: 3,650 ly (1,119 pc)
- Apparent magnitude (V): 7.1
- Apparent dimensions (V): 18′

Physical characteristics
- Other designations: Melotte 62, OCL 567

Associations
- Constellation: Monoceros

NGC 2353, also known as Avery's Island, is an open cluster of stars located in the constellation of Monoceros. It has an apparent magnitude of 7.1 and an approximate size of 18 arc-minutes. The cluster is dominated by the magnitude 6.0 star HIP 34999, which lies at the southern edge of the cluster.

== Location ==
NGC 2353 lies 19 arc-minutes northwest of the asterism NGC 2351.

NGC 2353 in optical light
