= NGC 2509 =

Open cluster in the constellation Puppis

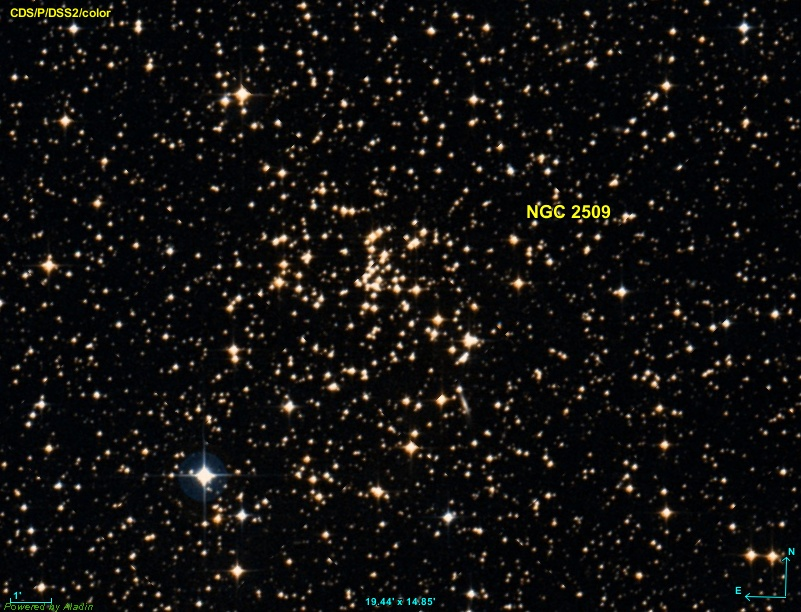
- DSS image of NGC 2509

Observation data (J2000 epoch)
- Right ascension: 08^{h} 00^{m} 48^{s}
- Declination: −19° 03′ 06″
- Distance: 9,500 ly (2,900 pc)
- Apparent magnitude (V): 9.3
- Apparent dimensions (V): 12′

Physical characteristics
- Estimated age: 1,200 Myr
- Other designations: NGC 2509, Cr 171, Mel 81, OCl 630

Associations
- Constellation: Puppis

NGC 2509 is an open cluster of stars in the constellation of Puppis. It was discovered on 3 December 1783 by William Herschel. It was described as "bright, pretty rich, slightly compressed" by John Louis Emil Dreyer, the compiler of the New General Catalogue.

The cluster is about 14 light-years (4.2 parsecs) wide, but the cluster's other parameters remain poorly known. Some studies have estimated a distance of about 9,500 light-years (2,900 parsecs) away from the Solar System, while older estimates put it at only 2980 light-years (912 parsecs) away. Estimates of the cluster's age have also varied significantly, from 1.2 billion years old to 8 billion years old. The latest analysis based on the parallaxes measured by the Gaia spacecraft confirms that it is a relatively distant object, with a distance between 2500 and 3000 parsecs.
