= NGC 2126 =

Open cluster in the constellation Auriga

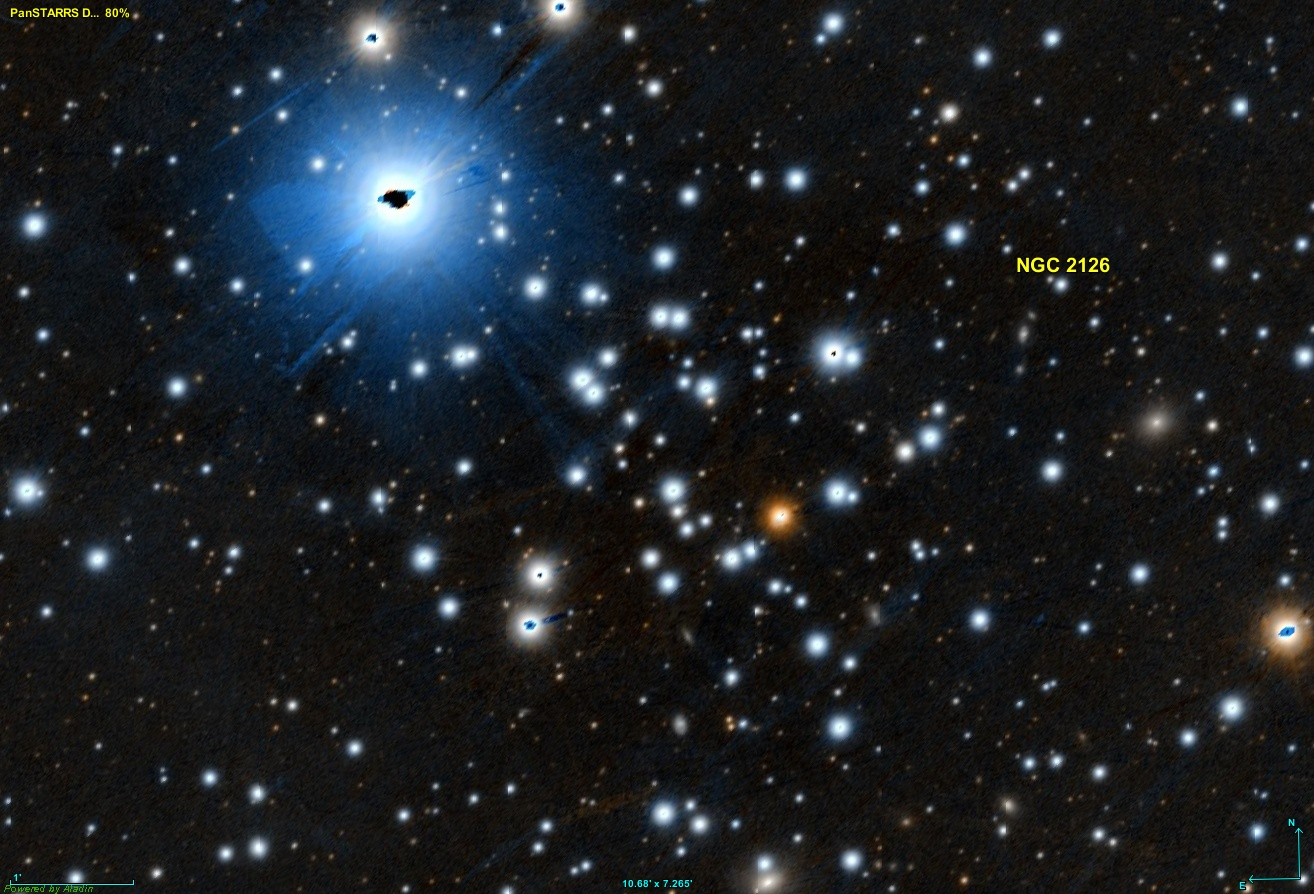
- Pan-STARRS image of NGC 2126 with annotation

Observation data (J2000 epoch)
- Right ascension: 06^{h} 02^{m} 37.9^{s}
- Declination: 49° 52′ 59″
- Distance: 4,126 ly (1,265 pc)
- Apparent magnitude (V): 10.2
- Apparent dimensions (V): 6′

Physical characteristics
- Estimated age: 1.3 to 1.6 Gyr
- Other designations: NGC 2126, Melotte 39, Collinder 78

Associations
- Constellation: Auriga

NGC 2126 is a moderately rich open cluster of stars in the northern constellation of Auriga. It was discovered on November 12, 1787 by German-British astronomer William Herschel. This conglomeration is positioned around half way between the brighter stars Beta Aurigae and Xi Aurigae. It is a challenge to find in a small telescope, having stars of 13th magnitude and fainter. NGC 2126 has an apparent visual magnitude of 10.2 and spans an angular size of 6 arcminutes. It is located at an estimated distance of 4,126 light-years (1,265 pc).

This cluster has a Trumpler class of III 2 m :b, indicating a fairly disparate set of stars (III), with a moderate range of brightness (2), and a medium number of stars (m). It is of intermediate age, estimated at approximately 1.3 to 1.6 Gyr. The cluster has a King core radius of 3.20 ± 0.68 ly (0.98 ± 0.21 pc) and tidal radius of 23.3 ± 5.2 ly (7.15 ± 1.59 pc). After removing contaminating stars, a 2003 study by A. Gáspár and associates found 103 members within a radius of 8′. As of 2024, a total of 129 stars have been identified that have a membership probability of at least 90%.

In a field around the cluster, six variable stars were discovered by A. Gáspár and associates in 2003. These include two δ Scuti, two long period variables, an Algol variable, and a possible eclipsing binary with a pulsating component. The variable count was increased by 16 in 2009 within a 1° field of view, including four eclipsing systems, at least one W UMa binary, and an RS CVn variable. By 2025, data from the Transiting Exoplanet Survey Satellite indicated there are 25 cluster member variables and 85 field variables within a 9 arcminute radius of NGC 2126.
