= IC 4651 =

Open star cluster in the constellation Ara

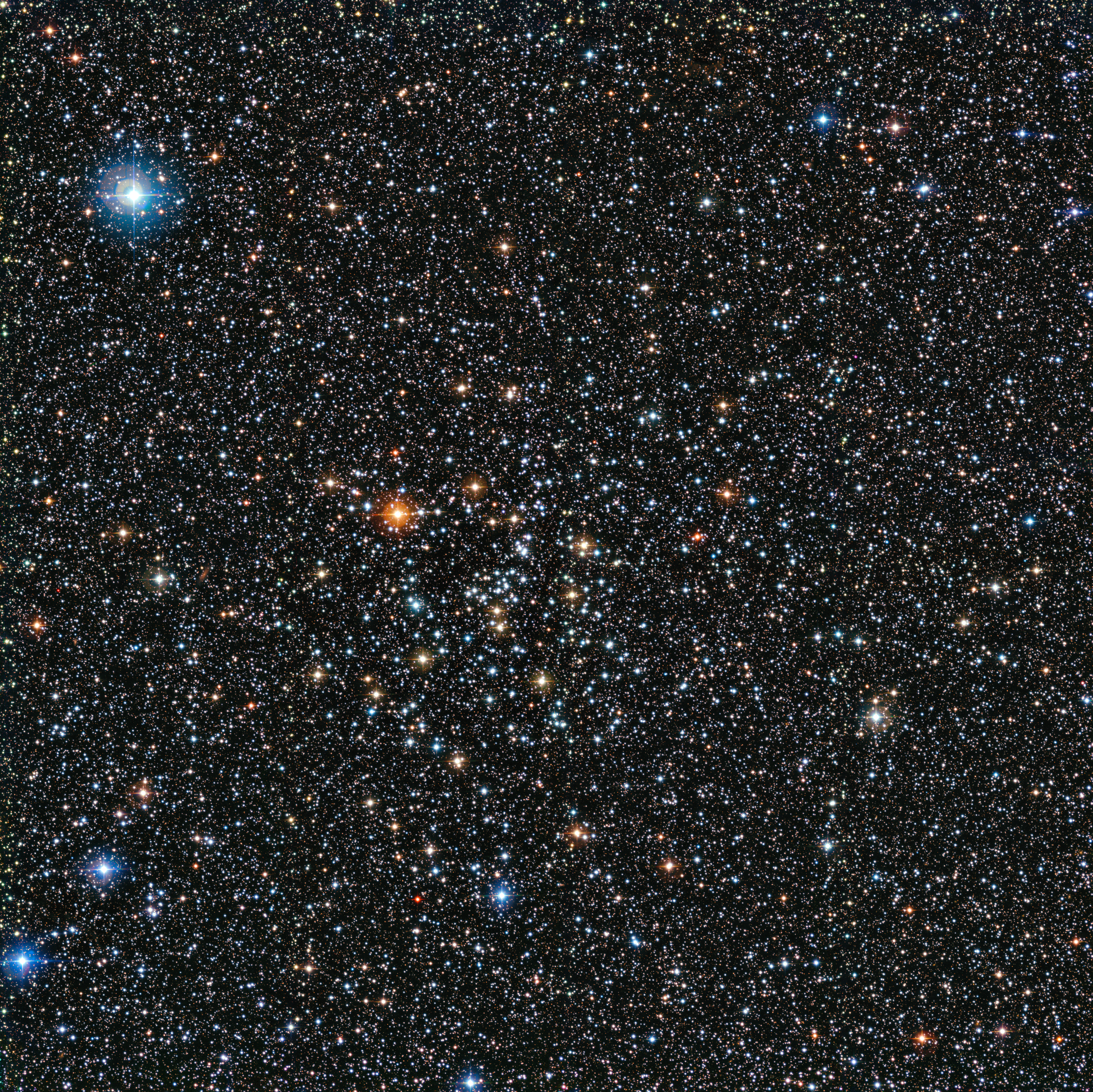
- Open cluster IC 4651 taken by the Wide Field Imager (WFI) camera, on the MPG/ESO 2.2-meter telescope at ESO’s La Silla Observatory in Chile.

Observation data (J2000 epoch)
- Right ascension: 17^{h} 24^{m} 49^{s}
- Declination: −49° 56′ 00″
- Distance: 2,900 ly (888 pc)
- Apparent dimensions (V): 10.0' (arcmin)

Physical characteristics
- Other designations: Cr 327, Mel 169

Associations
- Constellation: Ara

IC 4651 is an open cluster of stars located about 2,900 light years distant in the constellation Ara. It was first catalogued by John Louis Emil Dreyer in his 1895 version of the Index Catalogue. This is an intermediate age cluster that is 1.2 ± 0.2 billion years old. Compared to the Sun, the members of this cluster have a higher abundance of the chemical elements other than hydrogen and helium. The combined mass of the active stars in this cluster is about 630 times the mass of the Sun.

The currently known active stars in this cluster form only about 7% of the cluster's original mass. Of the remainder, about 35% of the mass consists of stars that have evolved into white dwarfs or other stellar remnants. The remainder of lost mass consists of stars that have migrated away from the main body of the cluster or have been lost completely.

The star IC 4651 9122 displays radial velocity variations suggesting the presence of a planetary companion, though stellar activity cannot be completely ruled out.
