= NGC 2266 =

Open cluster in the constellation Gemini

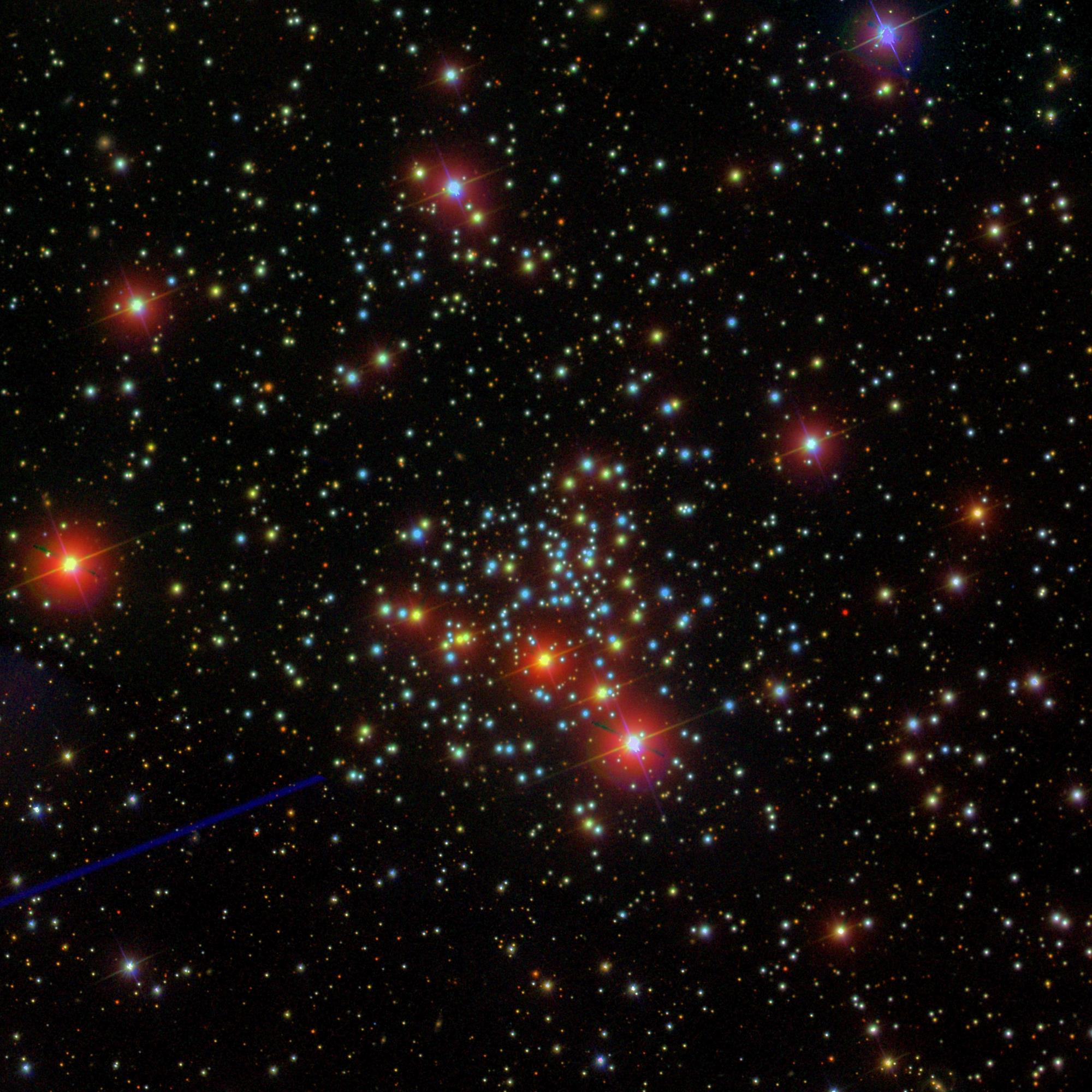
- SDSS (Sloan Digital Sky Survey) image

Observation data (J2000 epoch)
- Right ascension: 06^{h} 43^{m} 19.7^{s}
- Declination: +26° 58′ 34″
- Distance: 10,603 ly (3,251.0 pc)
- Apparent magnitude (V): 9.5
- Apparent dimensions (V): 5.0′

Physical characteristics
- Radius: 16.1 ly
- Estimated age: 81.2 Myr
- Other designations: NGC 2266, Cr 113, Mel 50, Lund 250

Associations
- Constellation: Gemini

NGC 2266 is an open cluster of stars in the constellation of Gemini. It was discovered by German-British astronomer William Herschel on 7 December 1785. This is a relatively dim cluster with an integrated visual magnitude of 9.5 and an angular size of 5.0′. The stellar members can be readily resolved with an amateur telescope. NGC 2266 is located at a distance of 10,603 ly (3,251.0 pc) from the Sun. It is located close to the opposite part of the sky from the Galactic Center, or the anti-center.

This is a rich cluster that is well condensed. It is of intermediate age; similar to the ages of the Hyades and Praesepe clusters. However, it has a lower metallicity than either cluster. NGC 2266 has a heliocentric radial velocity of −16±15 km/s. A 2008 study found 12 variable stars in the field of this cluster, although they lie outside the cluster radius. A single candidate blue straggler has been identified.
