= NGC 6649 =

Open cluster in the constellation Scutum

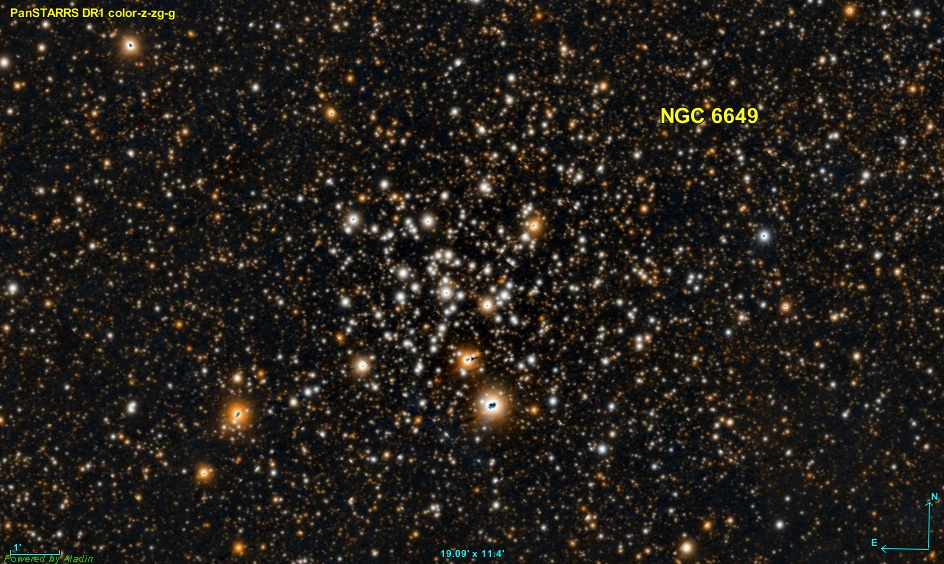
- NGC 6649 by PanSTARRS

Observation data (J2000 epoch)
- Right ascension: 18^{h} 33^{m} 26^{s}
- Declination: −10° 23′ 56″
- Distance: 4,470 ly (1,370 pc)
- Apparent magnitude (V): 8.9
- Apparent dimensions (V): 5.0'

Physical characteristics
- Estimated age: 60 million years
- Other designations: Collinder 384

Associations
- Constellation: Scutum

NGC 6649 is an open cluster in the constellation Scutum. It was discovered by William Herschel on 10 July 1787. The cluster is about 40–60 million years old and it is located 4,500 light years away. Cepheid variable V367 Scuti is a member of the cluster.

NGC 6649 is a rich cluster with more than a thousand members with apparent magnitude over 20 extending at a radial distance of about 21 arcminutes, with the core of the cluster having a radius of 2.4 arcminutes, which corresponds to 1.4 parsecs at the distance of the cluster. The tidal radius of the cluster is estimated to be 35.85±6.64 arcminutes, which corresponds to about 21 parsecs at the distance of the cluster, indicating a cluster with a dense core and an extended halo. Two smaller clusters have been detected in the vicinity of the cluster, forming a triple system.

The turnoff point of NGC 6649 is estimated to be at 4.8 M_{☉}, which corresponds to a spectral type of B5. A total of 59 stars are estimated to be of spectral type B, indicating an original star mass of about 2,600 M_{☉}. Two red supergiants are also members of the cluster based on the reddening, along with a Cepheid variable, V367 Scuti. Seven members of the cluster are found to be Be stars, and the cluster hosts two blue straggler star candidates. The metallicity of the cluster is estimated to be [Fe/H] = +0.02 ± 0.07, slightly below the expected value based on the mean galactic gradient.
