= NGC 6400 =

Open cluster located in the constellation Scorpius

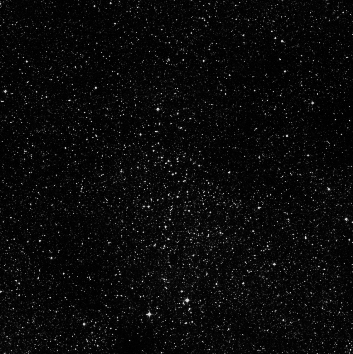
- NGC 6400 taken by the digitized sky survey, in 1994.

Observation data (J2000 epoch)
- Right ascension: 17^{h} 40^{m} 12.8^{s}
- Declination: −36° 56′ 52″
- Apparent magnitude (V): 8.8
- Apparent dimensions (V): 12.0

Physical characteristics
- Other designations: Cr 342, OCL 1014 and ESO 393-SC14

Associations
- Constellation: Scorpius

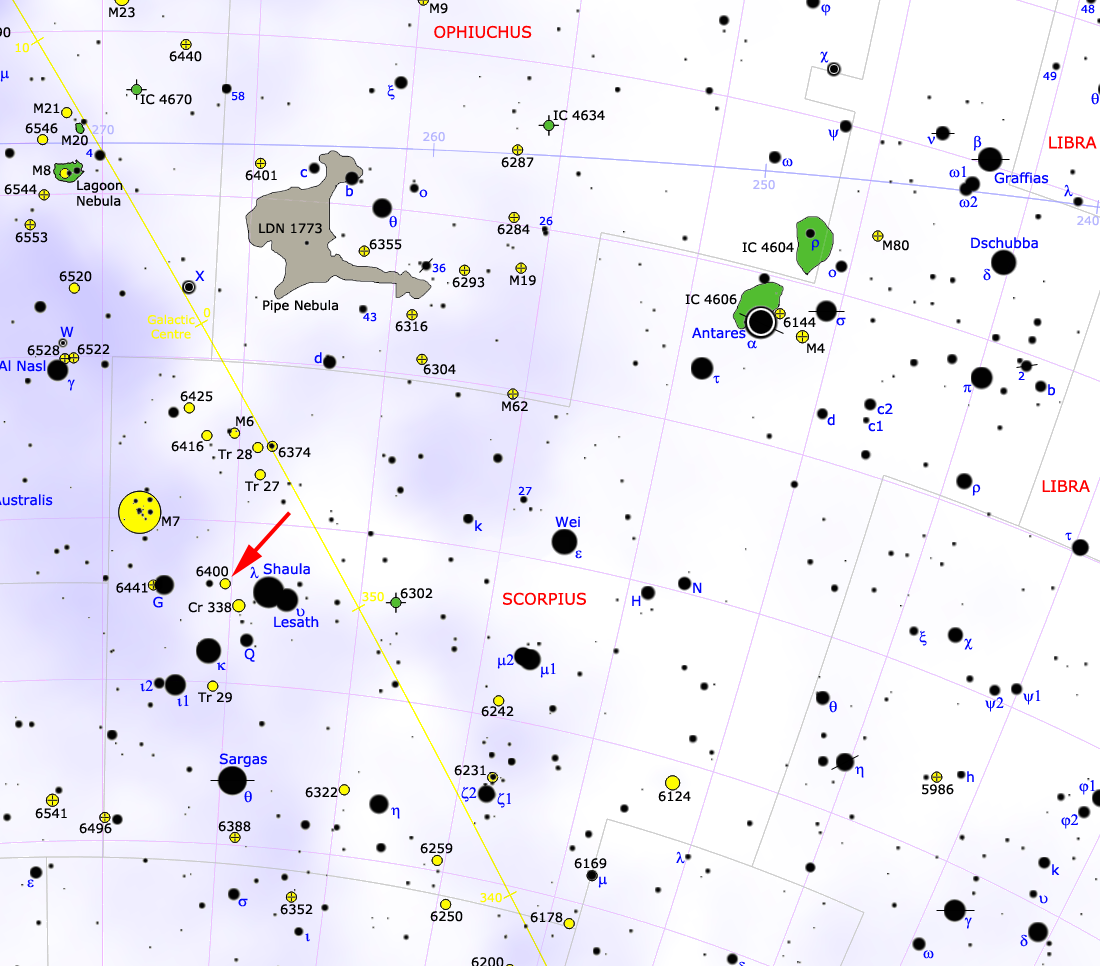
NGC 6400 on a map

NGC 6400, also known as the Phantom Cluster or Long John Silver Cluster, is an open cluster located in the constellation Scorpius. It is designated as II2m in the galaxy morphological classification scheme and was discovered by the Scottish astronomer James Dunlop on 13 May 1826. It is at a distance of 3,097 light years away from Earth.

== See also ==
- List of NGC objects (6001–7000)
- List of NGC objects
