= NGC 1647 =

Open cluster in the constellation Taurus

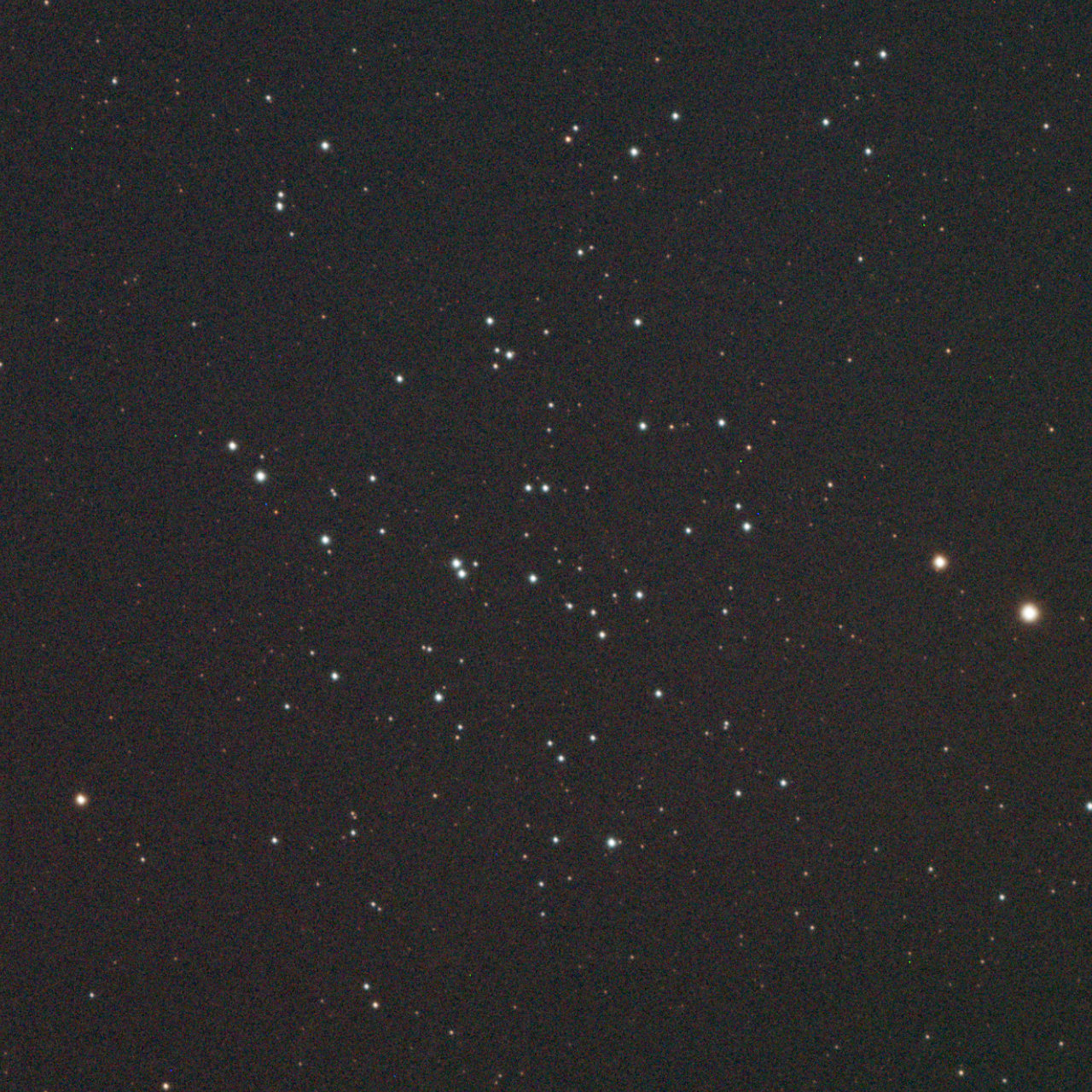
- NGC 1647 in 20205

Observation data (J2000 epoch)
- Right ascension: 04^{h} 45^{m} 55^{s}
- Declination: ±19° 06′ 54″
- Distance: 1,800 ly (550 pc)
- Apparent magnitude (V): 6.4
- Apparent dimensions (V): 40′

Physical characteristics
- Estimated age: 203 ± 27 Myr
- Other designations: Cr 54, Pirate Moon Cluster

Associations
- Constellation: Taurus

NGC 1647, also known as the Pirate Moon Cluster, is an open cluster of stars in the constellation of Taurus. It contains nearly 90 stars and it lies at a distance of 550 parsec. This cluster is visible with binoculars close to Aldebaran. It was discovered by German-English astronomer William Herschel in 1784. NGC 1647 is located behind the Taurus dark nebula complex which is approximately 160 parsec away. The brightest main sequence stars are of spectral type B7. Its age is estimated to be about 200 million years.
