= NGC 4103 =

Open cluster in the constellation Crux

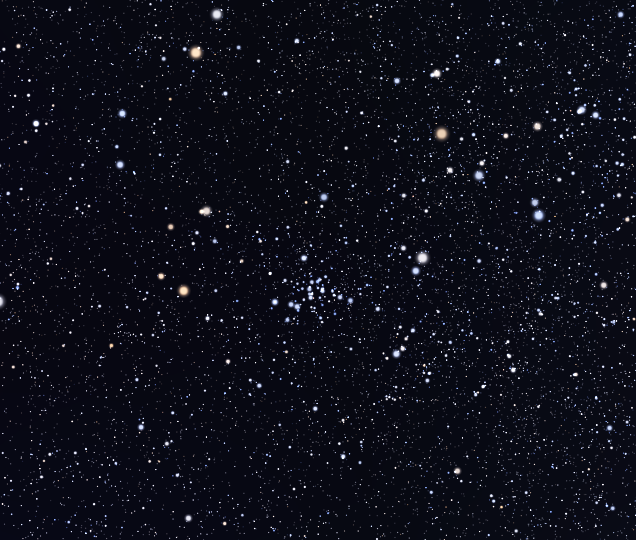

Observation data (J2000 epoch)
- Right ascension: 12^{h} 00^{m} 39^{s}
- Declination: −61° 55′ 00″
- Distance: 5,320 ly (1,632 pc)
- Apparent magnitude (V): 7.4
- Apparent dimensions (V): 12'

Physical characteristics
- Mass: 1,180 M_{☉}
- Estimated age: 25 million years
- Other designations: Collinder 252, Melotte 109

Associations
- Constellation: Crux

NGC 4103 is an open cluster in the constellation Crux. It was discovered by James Dunlop in 1826. It is located approximately 5,000 light years away from Earth, in the Carina-Sagittarius arm.

== Characteristics ==
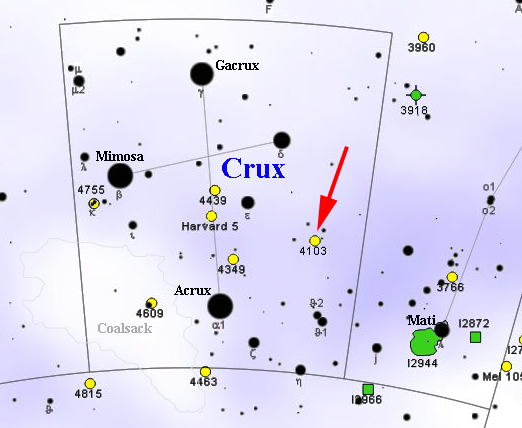
Location within the constellation

NGC 4103 is a young open cluster. Its age has been determined to be 30 Myr by Sagar & Cannon (1997), 20 ± 5 Myr by Sanner et al. (2001) and 6 Myr by Piskunov et al. (2004). The metallicity of NGC 4103 is subsolar (−0.47). The tidal radius of the cluster is 12.1 - 15.9 parsecs (39 - 51 light years) and represents the average outer limit of NGC 4103, beyond which a star is unlikely to remain gravitationally bound to the cluster core.

== Members ==
There are 421 probable member stars within the angular radius of the cluster and 199 within the central part of the cluster. No blue straggler has been detected in the cluster. The cluster is not very richly populated and is dominated by moderately bright stars of 10th magnitude and fainter. The hottest stars of the cluster are of spectral type B2. No red giants have been found to be members of the cluster. One member of the cluster is a Be star.

Among the members of the cluster is AI Crucis, a short-period semi-detached massive close binary star, with orbit period 1.41771 days. The orbital period of the binary is continuously increasing and this has been explained on the grounds of mass transfer from the less massive component to the more massive one and strong stellar wind from the hot component. It is estimated that 4.1 M_{☉} have been transferred from the hot component to the more massive.
