= NGC 1746 =

Asterism in Taurus

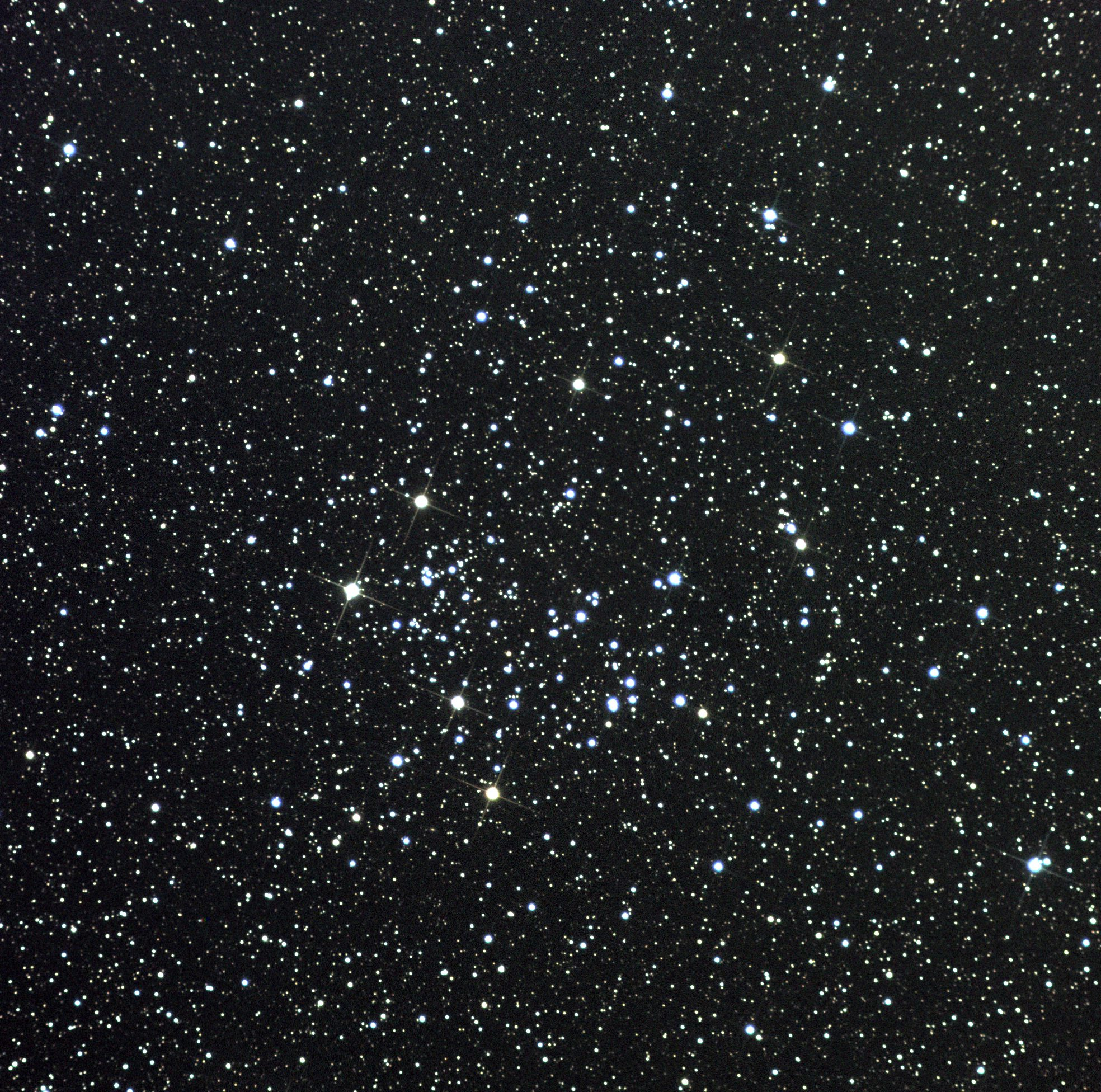
- Amateur image of NGC 1746. NGC 1750 and NGC 1758 overlap NGC 1746 and each other, south and south east of the centre of NGC 1746.

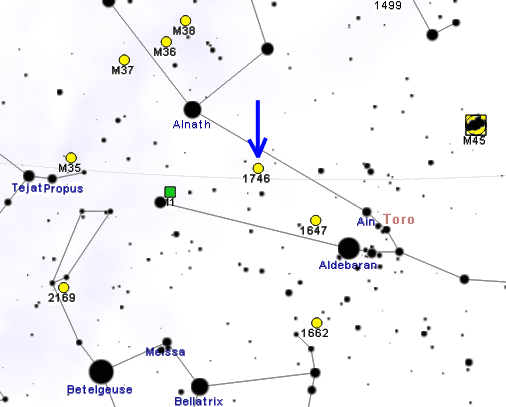
- Location map
- Object type: Asterism
- Other designations: Cr 57, Mel 28

Observation data (Epoch J2000.0)
- Constellation: Taurus
- Right ascension: 05^{h} 03^{m} 50.0^{s}
- Declination: +23° 46′ 12″
- In visual light (V)
- Apparent size: ~40'
- Apparent magnitude: 6.1
- Related media on Wikimedia Commons

NGC 1746 is an asterism in the constellation Taurus that was described in 1863 by Heinrich Louis d'Arrest and as a result was recorded in the New General Catalogue (NGC). Previously, the object was classified as an open cluster; however, it was shown through more recent observations that it is a random formation of stars in Earth's sky, an asterism. NGC 1746 has an apparent magnitude of 6.1. It is also known as the Cluster of Clusters or the Taurus Triplet as the region of the sky also include NGC 1750 and NGC 1758.

NGC 1746 is a sparse, star grouping that spans around 40 arcminutes. Originally classified as an open cluster, later studies suggest it is likely to be an asterism.

NGC 1750 is a true open star cluster, spanning 20 arcminutes, with an estimated age of about 200 million years. It contains several hundred stars, many of which are still on the main sequence. NGC 1758 is a smaller and denser open cluster, about 12 arcminutes in size, and somewhat further away than NGC 1750. Its stars are older, with an estimated age of 541 million years. Despite its age, there are no confirmed red giant members of NGC 1758.

Although these clusters are visually close, detailed analysis of stellar motion and distance indicates that NGC 1750 and NGC 1758 are unrelated clusters, and NGC 1746 is likely a random grouping of stars rather than a true cluster.
