= NGC 6939 =

Open cluster in the constellation Cepheus

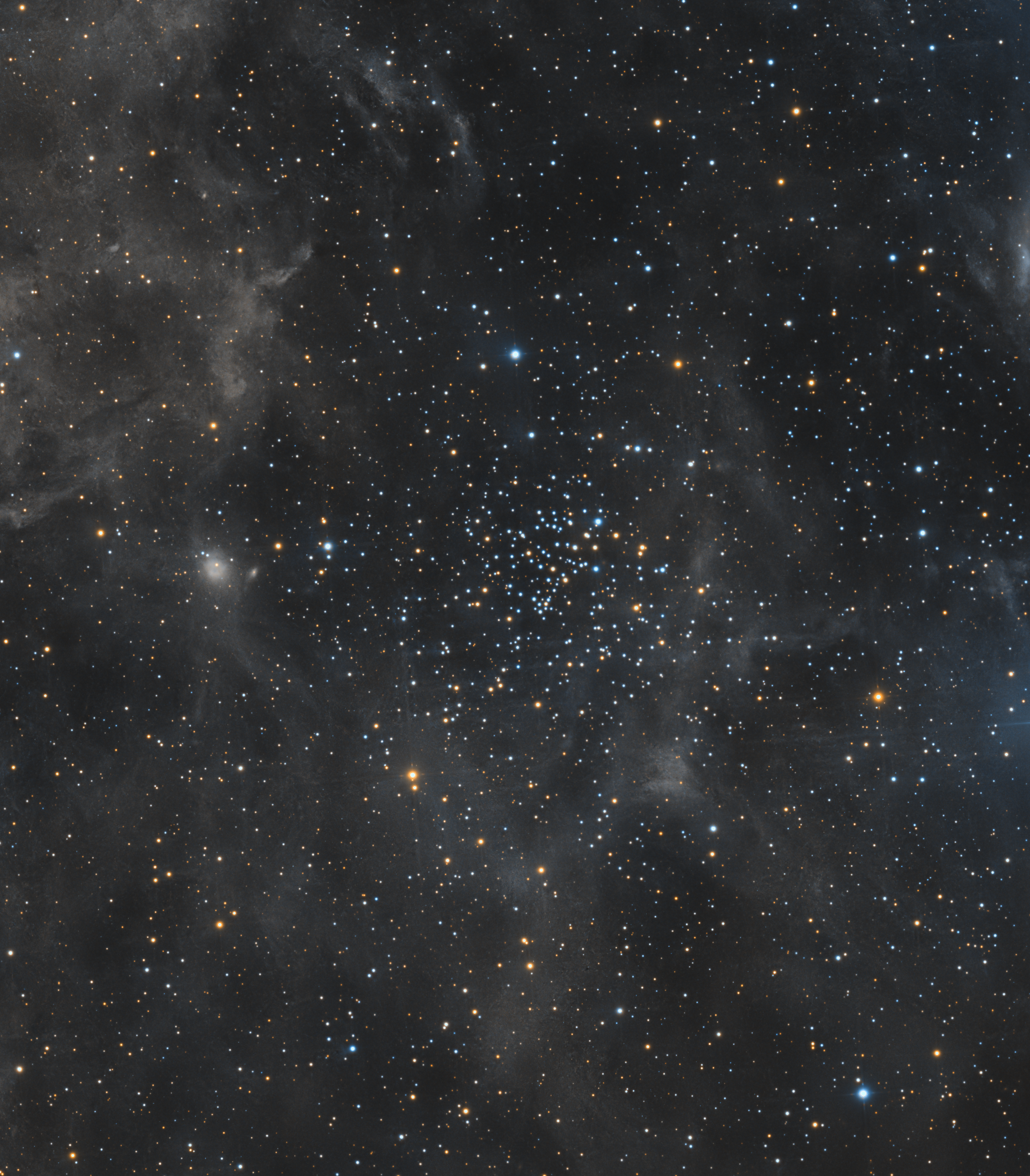
- NGC 6939 is at the center surrounded by integrated flux nebulae

Observation data (J2000 epoch)
- Right ascension: 20^{h} 31^{m} 30^{s}
- Declination: +60° 39′ 42″
- Distance: 3,860 ly (1,185 pc)
- Apparent magnitude (V): 7.8
- Apparent dimensions (V): 7'

Physical characteristics
- Estimated age: 2.2 billion years
- Other designations: Melotte 231

Associations
- Constellation: Cepheus

NGC 6939, also known as the Flying Geese Cluster or Silk Fan Cluster, is an open cluster in the constellation Cepheus. It was discovered by William Herschel in 1798. The cluster lies 2/3° northwest from the spiral galaxy NGC 6946. The cluster lies approximately 4,000 light years away and it is over a billion years old.

== Observation ==
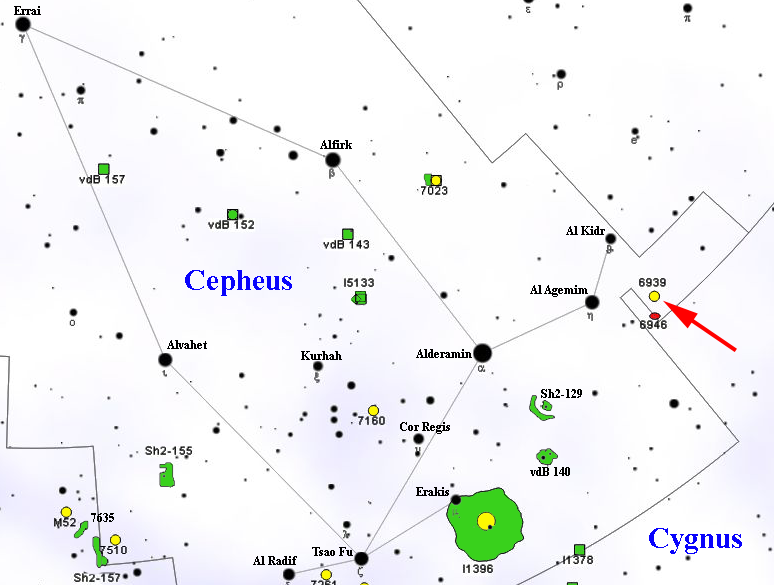
Map showing location of NGC 6939

NGC 6939 is located near the border of the constellations Cepheus and Cygnus, at the southwest corner of Cepheus. The open cluster is located two degrees southwest of Eta Cephei and 2/3° northwest from the spiral galaxy NGC 6946, which has visual magnitude 8.7. They appear as two patches of haze with 10x50 binoculars. NGC 6939 can be seen and glimpsed with 7x35 binoculars where as 25x200 binoculars are required to start resolve the cluster. The cluster can be glimpsed with 4 inches telescope and is resolved at x72 magnification. NGC 6939 is included in the Herschel 400 Catalogue.

== Characteristics ==
NGC 6939 is an old open cluster, located 400 parsec above the galactic plane and 8.400 parsec away from the galactic centre. With the use of photometric studies, the age of the cluster was estimated to be between 1,0 and 1,3 billion years!, using as sample 638 stars within the field. The metallicity of the cluster is slightly subsolar (-0.19±0.09).

Some of its members are variable stars: a study in 1998 led to the discovery of six variable stars among the red giants of the cluster, with two of which are Algol type and V466 Cephei appears to be a W Ursae Majoris type. A further study in 2004 identified further 10 variables near the cluster, five of which were W Ursae Majoris type and one RR Lyrae.
