= NGC 6866 =

Open cluster in the constellation Cygnus

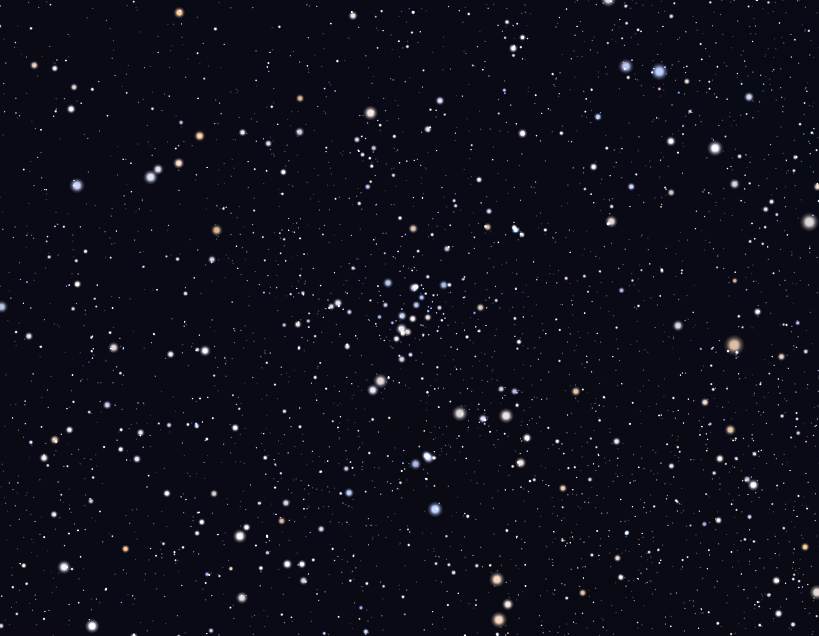

Observation data (J2000 epoch)
- Right ascension: 20^{h} 03^{m} 55.9^{s}
- Declination: +44° 09′ 29″
- Distance: 4.35 ± 0.53 kly (1.335 ± 0.163 kpc)
- Apparent magnitude (V): 7.6
- Apparent dimensions (V): 7′

Physical characteristics
- Mass: 1,274.52 M_{☉} M_{☉}
- Radius: 25.1 ± 3.6 ly (7.7 ± 1.1 pc)
- Estimated age: 430±50 Ma
- Other designations: NGC 6866, Cr 412

Associations
- Constellation: Cygnus

NGC 6866, also known as the Kite Cluster or Frigate Bird Cluster, is a young open cluster of stars in the northern constellation Cygnus. It was discovered by German astronomer Caroline Herschel on 23 July 1783. This cluster is located at an estimated distance of 4.35 ± 0.53 thousand light-years from the Sun, and is circling the Galactic Center with a slight orbital eccentricity of 0.12. It shows a heliocentric radial velocity of 12.18±1.14 km/s.

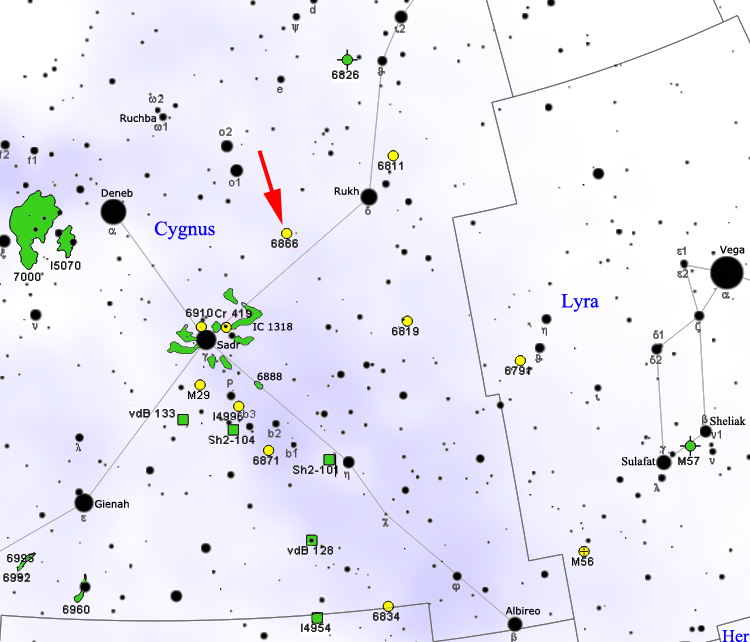
Map showing location of NGC 6866

The angular radius of the cluster is estimated as about 21′±3′, while the core radius is 10.3′±1.8′. A total of 1,357 main sequence stars are determined to be likely cluster members. The combined mass of member stars is estimated as 1,274.52 M_{☉}. It shows a loss rate of 1.92 stars per million years. The metallicity of the cluster – the abundance of elements of greater mass than helium – is similar to that in the Sun.

NGC 6866 is one of four clusters located in what was the field of view of the Kepler space telescope. Using asteroseismic analysis of the Kepler data, the age of NGC 6866 is estimated to be about 430 million years old. The cluster includes 31 Delta Scuti and 8 Gamma Doradus variables, with four eclipsing binaries, and 106 stars displaying rotational modulation that is indicative of star spots. Two systems are W Ursae Majoris variables.
