= NGC 7789 =

Open star cluster in the constellation Cassiopeia

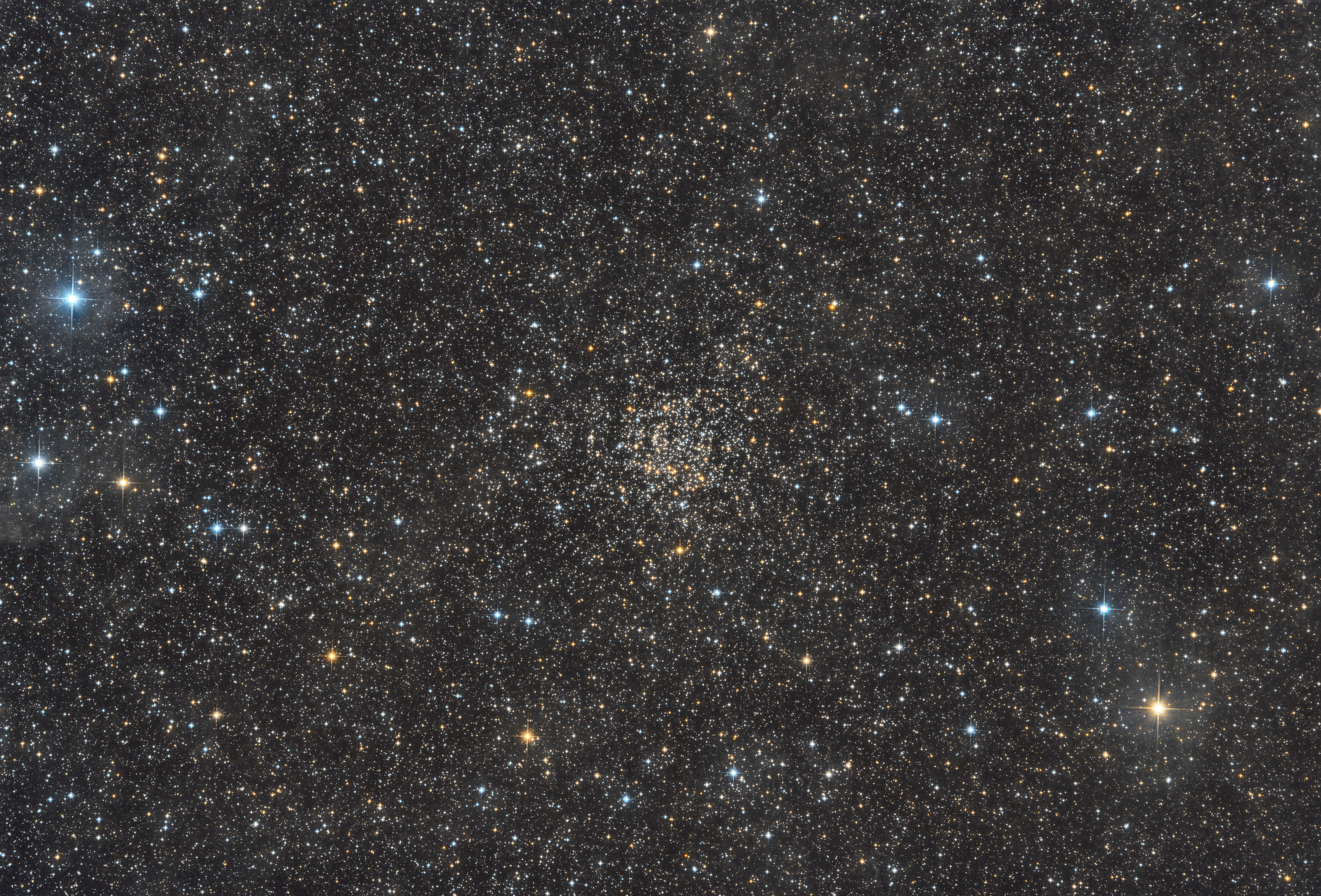
- NGC 7789 taken with an amateur telescope

Observation data (J2000.0 epoch)
- Right ascension: 23^{h} 57^{m} 24^{s}
- Declination: +56° 42′ 30″
- Distance: 7.6 kly (2,337)
- Apparent magnitude (V): 6.7
- Apparent dimensions (V): 16′

Physical characteristics
- Mass: 6620.4±762.5 M_{☉}
- Estimated age: 1.4-1.7 GYr
- Other designations: Caroline's Rose, White Rose Cluster, Cr 460, Mel 245

Associations
- Constellation: Cassiopeia

NGC 7789 (also known as Caroline's Rose, Caroline's Haystack, Herschel's Spiral Cluster, Crab Cluster, Screaming Skull Cluster, or the White Rose Cluster) is an open cluster located around 7,600 light years from Earth in the constellation of Cassiopeia. It is intermediate-age cluster with estimates ranging from 1.4 to 1.7 billion years old. It has a mass of around 6,620.4±762.5 solar masses.

It was discovered by Caroline Herschel in 1783. Her brother William Herschel included it in his catalog as H VI.30. This cluster is also known as the "White Rose" Cluster or "Caroline's Rose" Cluster because when seen visually, the loops of stars and dark lanes look like the swirling pattern of rose petals as seen from above.

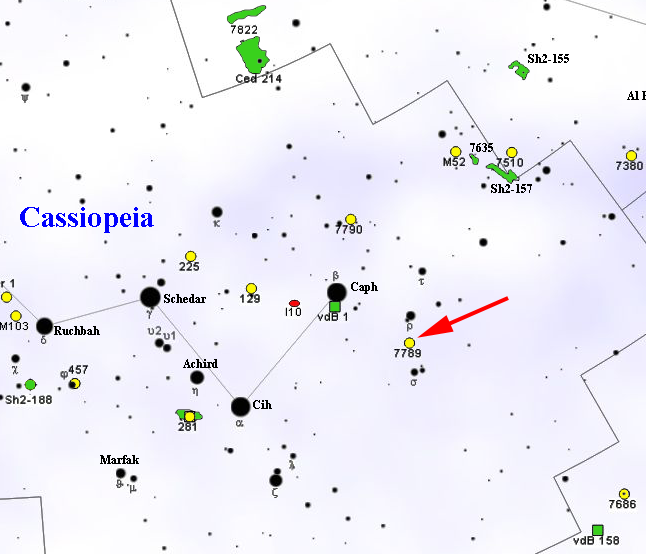
Map showing location of NGC 7789 in Cassiopeia

== Characteristics ==
=== Age ===
While it is known that the cluster is of intermediate-age, its exact age is unknown with studies giving estimates ranging from 1.4 to 1.6-1.7 billion years. The wide range of ages and little consensus on the age of NGC 7789 is from the combined effects of differential reddening, high binary fraction and rotation-driven broadening of main-sequence turnoff.

=== Abundances ===
The abundances of this cluster is not simple but is instead complex with various elements having raised abundances. Elements that are formed through neutron-capture are significantly enhanced in their abundance, particularly barium which has an abundance of [Ba/Fe] +0.47 to +0.48. Elements that are produced by the r-process and s-process on the other hand such as iron and yttrium are not as abundant. There seems to be some minor discrepancies for elements such as calcium, sodium, oxygen and aluminum (only one doublet).

Early studies that estimated the photometric metallicity of NGC 7789 placed the cluster as having sub-solar values ([Fe/H] −0.26±0.10). However modern studies have placed the iron abundance to be similar to the Sun at [Fe/H] −0.04±0.05. The nitrogen abundance of stars within NGC 7789 are enhanced compared to the rest of the galaxy. Giant stars in the cluster have a abundance of [N/Fe] 0.15±0.13 while clump stars have a abundance of [N/Fe] 0.26±0.08. Ratios of sodium and aluminum are also enhanced.

==== Lithium ====
The majority of red giant stars within the cluster have abundances of light elements such as lithium, carbon, nitrogen and oxygen that are consistent. However the stars NGC 7789-193 and NGC 7789-301 have anomalously high abundances of lithium with the latter also having strong helium features. There are two explanations for this abundance, the first is internal mixing of the star during their helium-flash while the second is interactions with a companion star sometime in the past. Either explanation involves the synthesis of lithium through the Cameron-Fowler Berillyum transport mechanism.

== Content ==
NGC 7789 has a rich and dense stellar population. It has a large number of main-sequence stars (yellow dwarfs), a prominent red giant population and an unusually large population of blue stragglers.
