= IC 361 =

Open cluster of stars in the constellation Camelopardalis

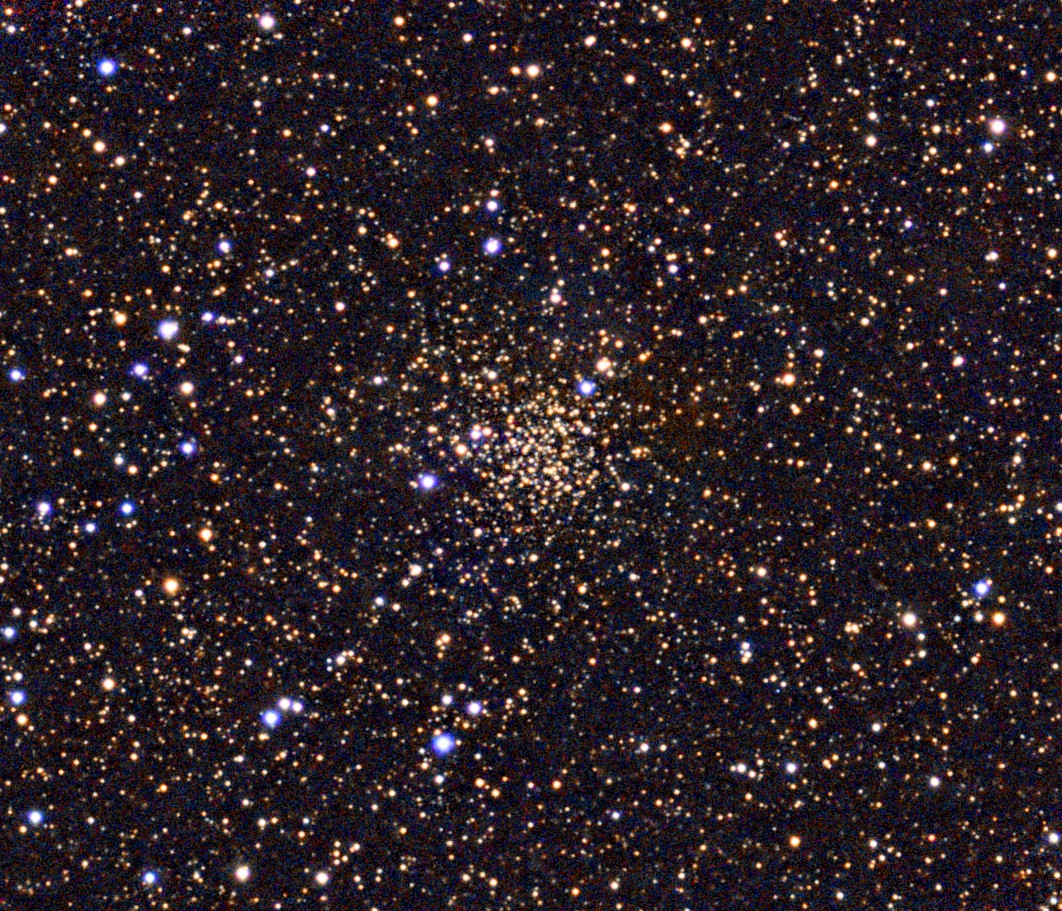
- Open star cluster IC 361 in the constellation Camelopardalis

Observation data (J2000 epoch)
- Right ascension: 04^{h} 18^{m} 56.6^{s}
- Declination: +58° 15′ 07″
- Distance: 10,500 ± 230 ly (3.22 ± 0.07 kpc)
- Apparent magnitude (V): 11.7
- Apparent dimensions (V): 6.0′

Physical characteristics
- Mass: 2,459±491 M_{☉}
- Radius: 24.5 ly
- Estimated age: 759 Myr
- Other designations: C 0414+581

Associations
- Constellation: Camelopardalis

IC 361, also called Melotte 24 is an open cluster of stars in the constellation Camelopardalis. It was discovered by the British amateur astronomer William F. Denning on February 11, 1893. This cluster is located at a distance of 10,500 ± 230 light-years from the Sun. It is very faint with an apparent visual magnitude of 11.7, requiring a telescope to view. Because of its faintness, this cluster has been poorly studied. The cluster spans an angular size of 6.0′.

This intermediate–age cluster is located in or beyond the Perseus Arm of the Milky Way galaxy. It is situated near dark nebulae, resulting in significant levels of extinction due to interstellar dust. The cluster has a core radius of 2.0′±0.4′ and a cluster radius of 8.0′±0.5′. At an estimated distance of 3.22 kpc this corresponds to a physical core radius of 6.1 ly and a cluster radius of 24.5 ly. It has an estimated age of 759 million years. The cluster is mildly metal deficient, matching the metallicity gradient of the Milky Way.

Two candidate blue stragglers have been identified in this cluster.
