= NGC 1342 =

Open cluster in the constellation Perseus

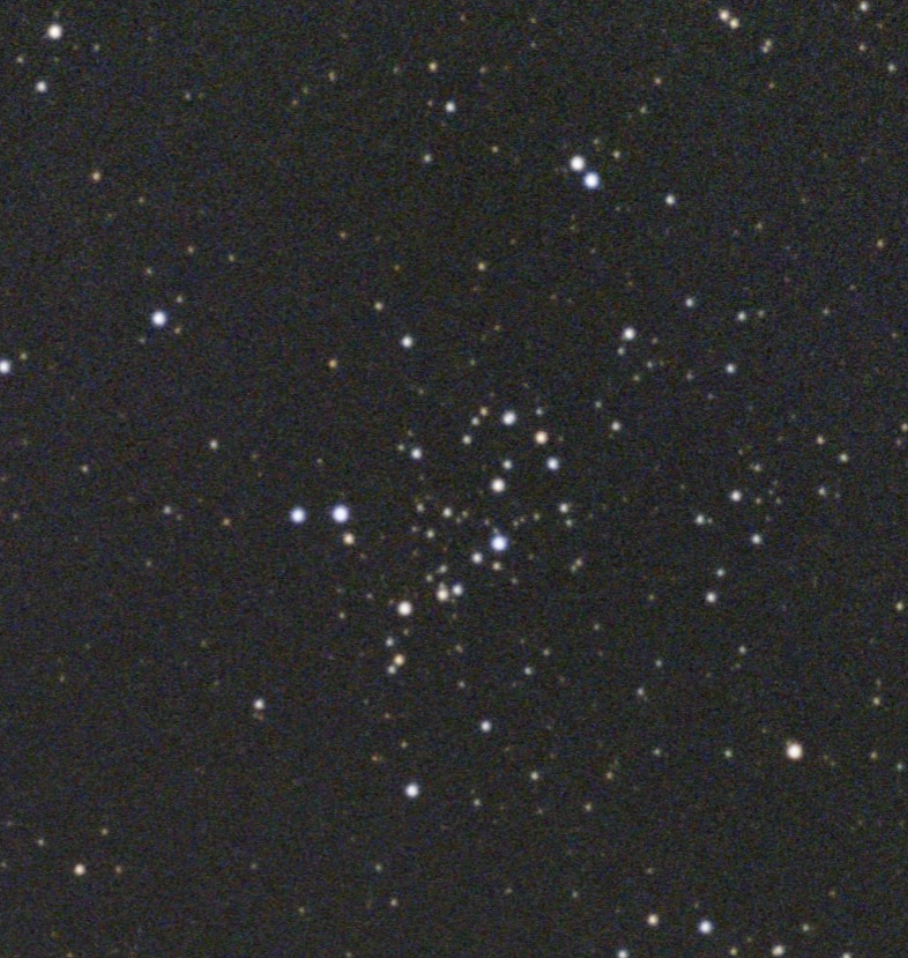
- NGC 1342 imaged in 2026

Observation data (J2000 epoch)
- Right ascension: 03^{h} 31^{m} 38^{s}
- Declination: +37° 22′ 36″
- Distance: 2,170 ly (670 pc)
- Apparent magnitude (V): 6.7
- Apparent dimensions (V): 17′

Physical characteristics
- Estimated age: 450 million years
- Other designations: Cr 40

Associations
- Constellation: Perseus

NGC 1342 is an open cluster of stars in the northern constellation of Perseus. Alternatively, it is known as the Stingray Cluster, or the Little Scorpion Cluster, due to a visual resemblance to the constellation Scorpius. Another less commonly used name for the cluster is the Sea Robin Cluster.

NGC 1342 cluster was discovered by William Herschel on 28 December 1799. It is located in the south of the constellation, almost halfway between Algol (β Persei) and ζ Persei, away from the plane of the Milky Way. NGC 1342 has an apparent size of 17' and an apparent magnitude of 6.7, marginally visible by naked eye.

In 1962, Beverly Turner Lynds discovered LDN 1434, located nearby NGC 1342. In 1994, Peña, J. H. and Peniche, R. estimated by the use of photometric data, that the age of the cluster is 400 million years.
