= Main sequence turnoff =

Point in stellar evolution

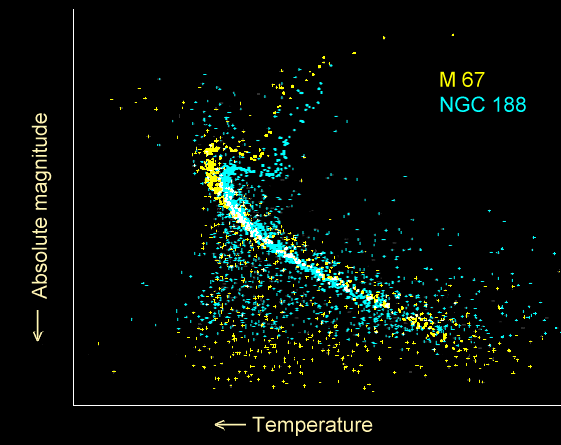
HR diagrams for two open clusters, M67 and NGC 188, showing the main sequence turn-off at different ages.

The turnoff point for a star refers to the point on the Hertzsprung–Russell diagram where it leaves the main sequence after its main fuel is exhausted – the main sequence turnoff.

By plotting the turnoff points of individual stars in a star cluster one can estimate the cluster's age.

== Stars with no turnoff point ==
Red dwarfs, also referred to as class M stars, are stars of 0.08–0.40 M_{☉}. They have sufficient mass to sustain hydrogen-to-helium fusion via the proton–proton chain reaction, but they do not have sufficient mass to create the temperatures and pressures necessary to fuse helium into carbon, nitrogen or oxygen (see CNO cycle). However, all their hydrogen is available for fusion, and low temperature and pressure means a lifetime measured in trillions of years. For example, the lifespan of a star of 0.1 solar masses is six trillion years. This lifespan greatly exceeds the current age of the universe, therefore all red dwarfs are main sequence stars. Even though extremely long lived, those stars will eventually run out of fuel. Once all the available hydrogen has been fused stellar nucleosynthesis stops, and the remaining helium slowly cools by radiation. Gravity contracts the star until electron degeneracy pressure compensates and it goes off the main sequence, becoming a white dwarf.
