= List of stars in Norma =

This is the list of notable stars in the constellation Norma, sorted by decreasing brightness.

Name	B	Var	HD	HIP	RA	Dec	vis. mag.	abs. mag.	Dist. (ly)	Sp. class	Notes
γ^{2} Nor	γ^{2}		146686	80000	16^{h} 19^{m} 50.57^{s}	−50° 09′ 19.4″	4.01	1.05	127	G8III	
ε Nor	ε		147971	80582	16^{h} 27^{m} 11.05^{s}	−47° 33′ 17.0″	4.46	−0.98	400	B4V	Yaqana, binary star
ι^{1} Nor	ι^{1}		143474	78662	16^{h} 03^{m} 32.22^{s}	−57° 46′ 29.5″	4.63	1.46	140	A7IV	multiple star
η Nor	η		143546	78639	16^{h} 03^{m} 12.86^{s}	−49° 13′ 47.0″	4.65	0.53	218	G8III	
δ Nor	δ		144197	78914	16^{h} 06^{m} 29.42^{s}	−45° 10′ 23.8″	4.73	1.84	123	Am	
μ Nor	μ		149038	81122	16^{h} 34^{m} 05.02^{s}	−44° 02′ 43.1″	4.91	−5.91	4657	B0Ia	α Cyg variable, V_{max} = 4.87^{m}, V_{min} = 4.98^{m}
κ Nor	κ		145397	79509	16^{h} 13^{m} 28.73^{s}	−54° 37′ 49.5″	4.95	−0.69	438	G4III	
γ^{1} Nor	γ^{1}		146143	79790	16^{h} 17^{m} 00.94^{s}	−50° 04′ 05.2″	4.97	−3.25	1436	F9Ia	
θ Nor	θ		145842	79653	16^{h} 15^{m} 15.35^{s}	−47° 22′ 18.9″	5.13	0.35	295	B8V	
HD 147152			147152	80208	16^{h} 22^{m} 28.01^{s}	−49° 34′ 20.2″	5.32	−0.84	556	B6IV	
QU Nor		QU	148379	80782	16^{h} 29^{m} 42.33^{s}	−46° 14′ 35.6″	5.35	−2.47	1194	B1.5Iap	α Cyg variable, V_{max} = 5.27^{m}, V_{min} = 5.41^{m}, P = 4.818 d
HD 139129	π		139129	76618	15^{h} 38^{m} 49.50^{s}	−52° 22′ 21.4″	5.43	−0.30	457	B9V	
λ Nor	λ		146667	79963	16^{h} 19^{m} 17.64^{s}	−42° 40′ 26.2″	5.44	−0.34	468	A3Vn	
V368 Nor		V368	146003	79754	16^{h} 16^{m} 43.27^{s}	−53° 48′ 40.0″	5.45	−1.51	805	M2III	semiregular variable
ι^{2} Nor	ι^{2}		144480	79153	16^{h} 09^{m} 18.56^{s}	−57° 56′ 03.0″	5.57	0.97	271	B9V	
HD 145782			145782	79689	16^{h} 15^{m} 49.81^{s}	−57° 54′ 44.0″	5.61	0.34	370	A5III	suspected variable
HD 147977	(ο)		147977	80675	16^{h} 28^{m} 15.18^{s}	−58° 35′ 59.0″	5.67	−0.92	679	B9III	
V360 Nor	υ	V360	141318	77645	15^{h} 51^{m} 06.81^{s}	−55° 03′ 19.9″	5.74	−4.51	3663	B2II	α Cyg variable
HD 146690			146690	80054	16^{h} 20^{m} 25.23^{s}	−55° 08′ 22.8″	5.76	0.53	363	G6III	
HD 141168	σ		141168	77562	15^{h} 50^{m} 07.11^{s}	−53° 12′ 34.8″	5.78	0.55	362	B8V	
HD 142049	(κ)		142049	77990	15^{h} 55^{m} 32.42^{s}	−60° 10′ 38.9″	5.78	2.18	171	Amvar	
ζ Nor	ζ		145361	79497	16^{h} 13^{m} 22.80^{s}	−55° 32′ 27.0″	5.78	1.53	231	F2III	
HD 141194			141194	77541	15^{h} 49^{m} 57.52^{s}	−48° 54′ 44.6″	5.86	1.99	194	A2IV	
HD 147225			147225	80212	16^{h} 22^{m} 29.07^{s}	−43° 54′ 43.3″	5.89	−1.63	1042	G2Ib	
HD 139211			139211	76716	15^{h} 39^{m} 56.69^{s}	−59° 54′ 28.1″	5.95	3.50	101	F6V	
HD 141544			141544	77678	15^{h} 51^{m} 31.52^{s}	−47° 03′ 38.6″	6.00	0.35	439	K1IV	
HD 139871			139871	76935	15^{h} 42^{m} 37.23^{s}	−49° 29′ 22.2″	6.02	0.02	517	K2III	
V367 Nor		V367	145384	79490	16^{h} 13^{m} 16.97^{s}	−53° 40′ 16.2″	6.03	−4.87	4939	M0III	irregular variable
HD 140979			140979	77454	15^{h} 48^{m} 50.42^{s}	−52° 26′ 17.6″	6.05	−0.82	773	K2/K3III	
V378 Nor		V378	148218	80788	16^{h} 29^{m} 45.22^{s}	−57° 45′ 22.7″	6.09	−2.27	1531	G8Ib	Cepheid variable
HD 142919	τ^{1}		142919	78355	15^{h} 59^{m} 54.15^{s}	−54° 01′ 15.2″	6.10	−1.88	1289	B5IV	
HD 141296			141296	77574	15^{h} 50^{m} 16.28^{s}	−45° 24′ 05.9″	6.11	2.85	147	F0V	
HD 143101			143101	78469	16^{h} 01^{m} 06.51^{s}	−54° 34′ 40.1″	6.12	0.43	448	A7III	
HD 145921			145921	79661	16^{h} 15^{m} 23.98^{s}	−42° 53′ 57.9″	6.14	1.76	245	K2III	
HD 144183			144183	78989	16^{h} 07^{m} 24.09^{s}	−56° 11′ 27.4″	6.16	−1.81	1278	F2II	
T Nor		T	140041	77058	15^{h} 44^{m} 03.84^{s}	−54° 59′ 12.5″	6.20		903	M4+B	Mira variable, V_{max} = 6.2^{m}, V_{min} = 13.6^{m}, P = 244 d
HD 146145			146145	79812	16^{h} 17^{m} 20.97^{s}	−53° 05′ 10.6″	6.30	1.85	253	A7V	
HD 142529			142529	78117	15^{h} 57^{m} 03.95^{s}	−48° 09′ 42.9″	6.31	2.84	161	F1IV	
HD 147614	ο		147614	80421	16^{h} 24^{m} 54.14^{s}	−45° 20′ 58.1″	6.32	1.51	299	A2/A3V	
HD 143321			143321	78540	16^{h} 02^{m} 04.49^{s}	−51° 07′ 14.6″	6.38	−0.35	723	B5V	
HD 143548			143548	78710	16^{h} 04^{m} 06.20^{s}	−59° 10′ 34.2″	6.40	−3.10	2587	K1II/III	
HD 146059			146059	79787	16^{h} 16^{m} 58.99^{s}	−53° 41′ 45.5″	6.40	2.11	236	G5V	
HD 140274	ρ		140274	77138	15^{h} 44^{m} 59.61^{s}	−50° 47′ 07.5″	6.41	1.44	321	A3V	
S Nor		S	146323	79932	16^{h} 18^{m} 51.82^{s}	−57° 53′ 59.2″	6.45	−3.18	2741	F9Ib	Cepheid variable, V_{max} = 6.12^{m}, V_{min} = 6.77^{m}, P = 9.75411 d; member of the NGC 6087 star cluster
HD 139915			139915	77042	15^{h} 43^{m} 55.28^{s}	−60° 17′ 13.9″	6.46	−1.62	1347	G0Ib	
QY Nor		QY	143658	78731	16^{h} 04^{m} 21.32^{s}	−53° 42′ 37.2″	6.46	−1.08	1048	B9II/IIIp..	α² CVn variable, ΔV = 0.014^{m}, P = 5.2 d
HD 147001	ξ		147001	80142	16^{h} 21^{m} 27.04^{s}	–48° 11′ 18.8″	6.51		447	B7V	
HD 139312	(μ)		139312	76734	15^{h} 40^{m} 10.96^{s}	–56° 54′ 52.3″	6.63		670	K1III	
HD 148937			148937	81180	16^{h} 33^{m} 52.39^{s}	−48° 06′ 40.5″	6.71		3,900	O5.5-6f?p	spectroscopic binary; misclassified as a planetary nebula
HD 139236	(ξ)		139236	76687	15^{h} 39^{m} 34.90^{s}	–55° 25′ 37.4″	6.94		1,930	K2III	
HD 143183	τ^{2}	V558	143183		16^{h} 01^{m} 36.22^{s}	–54° 08′ 35.6″	7.30		5,867	M1/2+B/F	
HD 142415			142415	78169	15^{h} 57^{m} 40.79^{s}	−60° 12′ 00.9″	7.34	4.65	113	G1V	has a planet (b)
HD 148156			148156	80680	16^{h} 28^{m} 17.28^{s}	−46° 19′ 03.4″	7.71	4.09	173	G1V	has a planet (b)
HD 139084		V343	139084	76629	15^{h} 38^{m} 57.54^{s}	−57° 42′ 27.3″	7.98		125.6	K0V	T Tauri star, ΔV = 0.092^{m}, P = 4.29 d
R Nor		R	138743	76377	15^{h} 35^{m} 57.35^{s}	−49° 30′ 28.6″	8.00	1.55	635	M3e	Mira variable, V_{max} = 6.5^{m}, V_{min} = 13.9^{m}, P = 507.5 d
IM Nor		IM			15^{h} 39^{m} 26.46^{s}	−52° 19′ 18.0″	8.5				recurrent nova and eclipsing binary, V_{max} = 8.5^{m}, V_{min} = 18.5^{m}, P = 0.10263312 d
QZ Nor		QZ	144972		16^{h} 11^{m} 20.46^{s}	−54° 21′ 14.8″	8.71			F6Iab:	Cepheid variable, V_{max} = 8.71^{m}, V_{min} = 9.03^{m}, P = 3.786008 d
HD 143361			143361	78521	16^{h} 01^{m} 50.35^{s}	−44° 26′ 04.3″	9.16	5.29	194	G6V	has a planet (b)
HD 330075			330075	77517	15^{h} 49^{m} 37.69^{s}	−49° 57′ 48.7″	9.36	5.86	164	G5	has a planet (b)
RS Nor		RS		78797	16^{h} 05^{m} 09.96^{s}	−53° 55′ 09.9″	10.09		1240	F6	Cepheid variable, V_{max} = 9.62^{m}, V_{min} = 10.39^{m}, P = 6.19814 d
RT Nor		RT		80365	16^{h} 24^{m} 18.65^{s}	−59° 20′ 38.7″	10.60			R	R CrB variable, V_{max} = 9.8^{m}, V_{min} = 14.7^{m}
RZ Nor		RZ			16^{h} 32^{m} 41.66^{s}	−53° 15′ 33.2″	10.63				R CrB variable, V_{max} = 10.2^{m}, V_{min} = <16.2^{m}, P = 36.8 d
TW Nor		TW		78771	16^{h} 04^{m} 55.22^{s}	−51° 57′ 12.7″	11.17				Cepheid variable, V_{max} = 11.17^{m}, V_{min} = 12.22^{m}, P = 10.78618 d
HD 330036			330036	77662	15^{h} 51^{m} 15.93^{s}	−48° 44′ 58.4″	11.28		2230	FIII-IV	Emission-line star; misclassified as a planetary nebula
V346 Nor		V346			16^{h} 32^{m} 32.19^{s}	−44° 55′ 30.7″	16.3				FU Ori variable, V_{max} = 16.3^{m}, V_{min} = 17.23^{m}
XTE J1550-564		V381			15^{h} 50^{m} 58.78^{s}	−56° 28′ 35.0″	16.6			K3III	X-ray nova, V_{max} = 15.6^{m}, V_{min} = <21.4^{m}, P = 1.5420333 d
Hen 2-147		V347			16^{h} 14^{m} 01.10^{s}	−56° 59′ 28.0″				M8/9e	Mira variable; misclassified as a planetary nebula
1E 161348-5055					16^{h} 17^{m} 36.30^{s}	−51° 02′ 26.6″			10000		unusual neutron star in RCW 103
SGR J1550-5418					15^{h} 50^{m} 54.11^{s}	−54° 18′ 23.7″			30000		soft gamma repeater
4U 1538-52		QV			15^{h} 42^{m} 23.36^{s}	−52° 23′ 09.6″				B0Iab	X-ray pulsar
4U 1608-52		QX			16^{h} 12^{m} 43.0^{s}	−52° 25′ 23″					X-ray burster, V_{max} = 11.17^{m}, V_{min} = 12.22^{m}, P = 10.78618 d
4U 1624-490					16^{h} 28^{m} 02.83^{s}	−49° 11′ 54.6″					Low-mass X-ray binary
4U 1630-47					16^{h} 34^{m} 01.61^{s}	−47° 23′ 34.8″					Low-mass X-ray binary
Table legend: • Name = Proper name • B = Bayer designation • F or/and G. = Flamsteed designation or Gould designation • Var = Variable-star designation • HD = Henry Draper Catalogue designation number • HIP = Hipparcos Catalogue designation number • RA = Right ascension for the Epoch/Equinox J2000.0 • Dec = Declination for the Epoch/Equinox J2000.0 • vis. mag. = visual magnitude (m or m_{v}), also known as apparent magnitude • abs. mag. = absolute magnitude (M_{v}) • Dist. (ly) = Distance in light-years from Earth • Sp. class = Spectral class of the star in the stellar classification system • Notes = Common name(s) or alternate name(s); comments; notable properties [for example: multiple star status, range of variability if it is a variable star, exoplanets, etc.]

== See also ==
- List of stars by constellation
