= Gamma Normae =

The Bayer designation γ Normae, which is Latinized as Gamma Normae and abbreviated γ Nor, is shared by two stars in the southern constellation of Norma:

- γ^{1} Normae, an F9 supergiant
- γ^{2} Normae, a G8 giant

The pair form a double star that can be resolved with the naked eye.
