= Iota Normae =

The Bayer designation ι Normae, which is Latinized as Iota Normae and abbreviated ι Nor, is shared by two stars in the southern constellation of Norma:

- ι^{1} Normae
- ι^{2} Normae

The pair form a double star that can be viewed with a small telescope.
