= NGC 6067 =

Open cluster in the constellation Norma

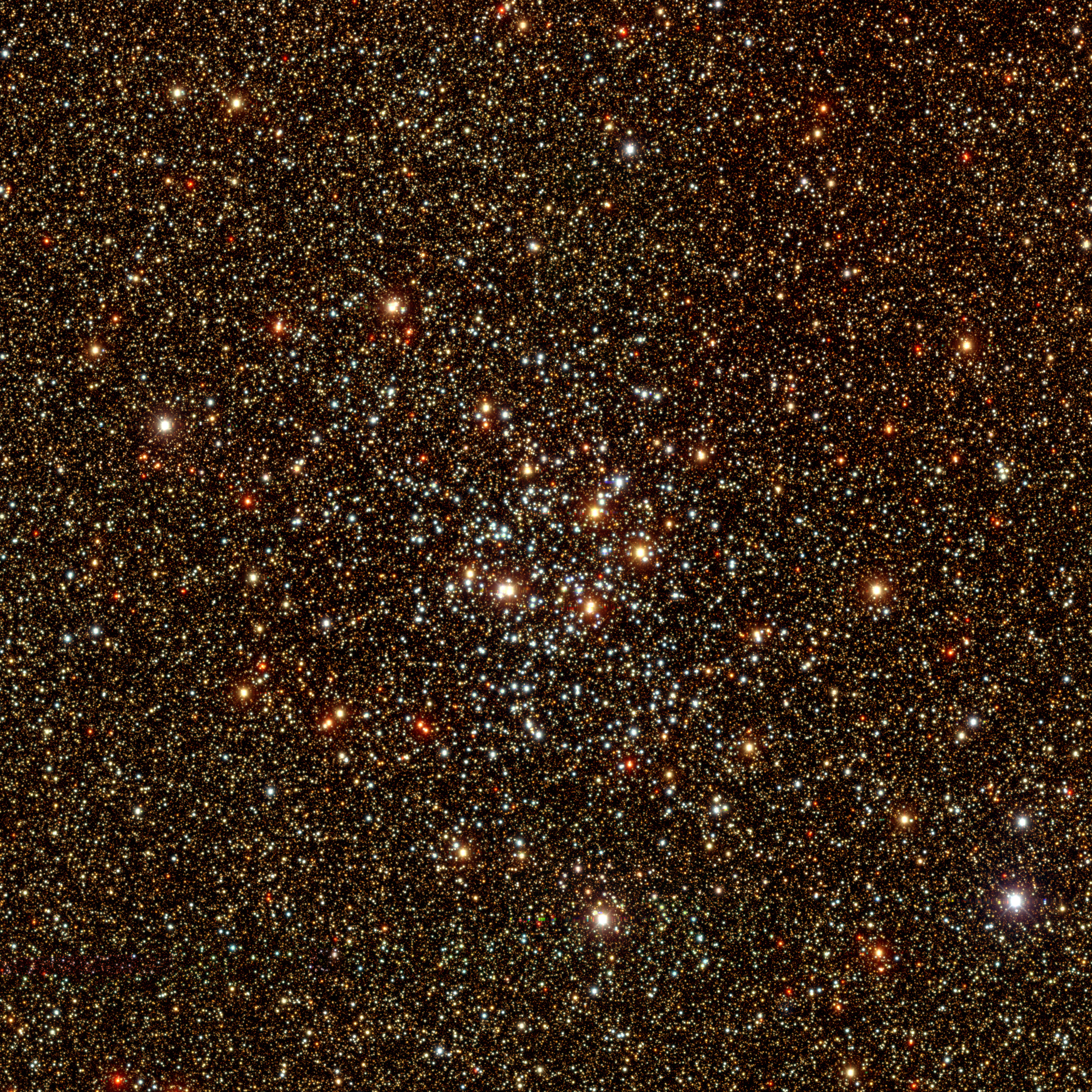
- NGC 6067; Credit: DECaPS

Observation data (J2000 epoch)
- Right ascension: 16^{h} 13.2^{m}
- Declination: −54° 13′
- Distance: 4,621 ly (1,417 pc)
- Apparent magnitude (V): 5.6
- Apparent dimensions (V): 12′

Physical characteristics
- Mass: 893 M_{☉}
- Estimated age: 102 Myr
- Other designations: Cr 298, Mel 140

Associations
- Constellation: Norma

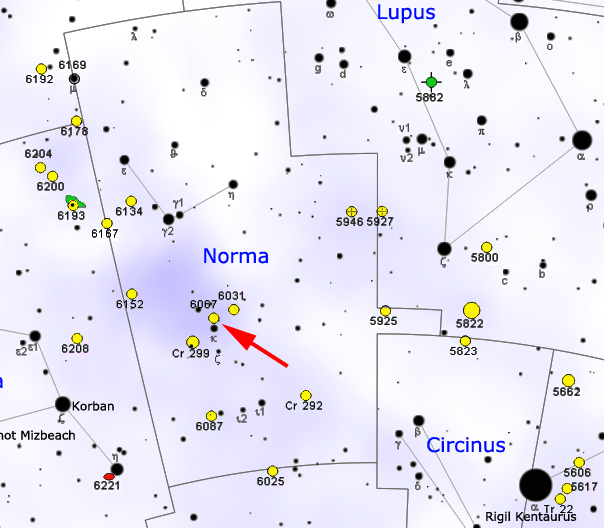
Map showing the location of NGC 6067

NGC 6067 is an open cluster in the constellation Norma. It is located to the north of Kappa Normae, with an angular diameter of 12′. Visible to the naked eye in dark skies, it is best observed with binoculars or a small telescope, and a 12-inch aperture telescope will reveal about 250 stars. Discovered by James Dunlop in 1826, it has been described by John Herschel as "a most superbly rich and large cluster" and by Stephen James O'Meara as "one of the sky's most stunning open star clusters". Its brightest stars have an apparent magnitude of around 8. There are 84 member stars with an apparent magnitude brighter than 12.

NGC 6067 is located in the Norma Star Cloud in the Norma Arm of the Milky Way and is 15 to 20 times as rich as the Pleiades and about the same age. It is thought to be around 102 million years old, and contain 893 solar masses. Two Cepheid variables, QZ Normae and V340 Normae, have been identified as members of the cluster, while a third nearby Cepheid—GU Normae—is considerably closer. Its period is only 3.5 days compared with the longer period of V340 Normae, indicating it is intrinsically less luminous (and hence closer), and its age has been estimated at 134 million years and hence too old to belong to the cluster. V340 Normae is a yellow supergiant of spectral type G0Ib that varies between magnitudes 8.26 and 8.60 over 11.28 days, while the fainter QZ Normae varies between magnitudes 8.71 and 9.03 over 3.79 days. It is also home to one of only a few planetary nebulae associated with galactic clusters (open or globular). The cluster, named BMP J1613-5406, originated from a progenitor star that is notably massive.
