= R Normae =

Variable star in the constellation Norma

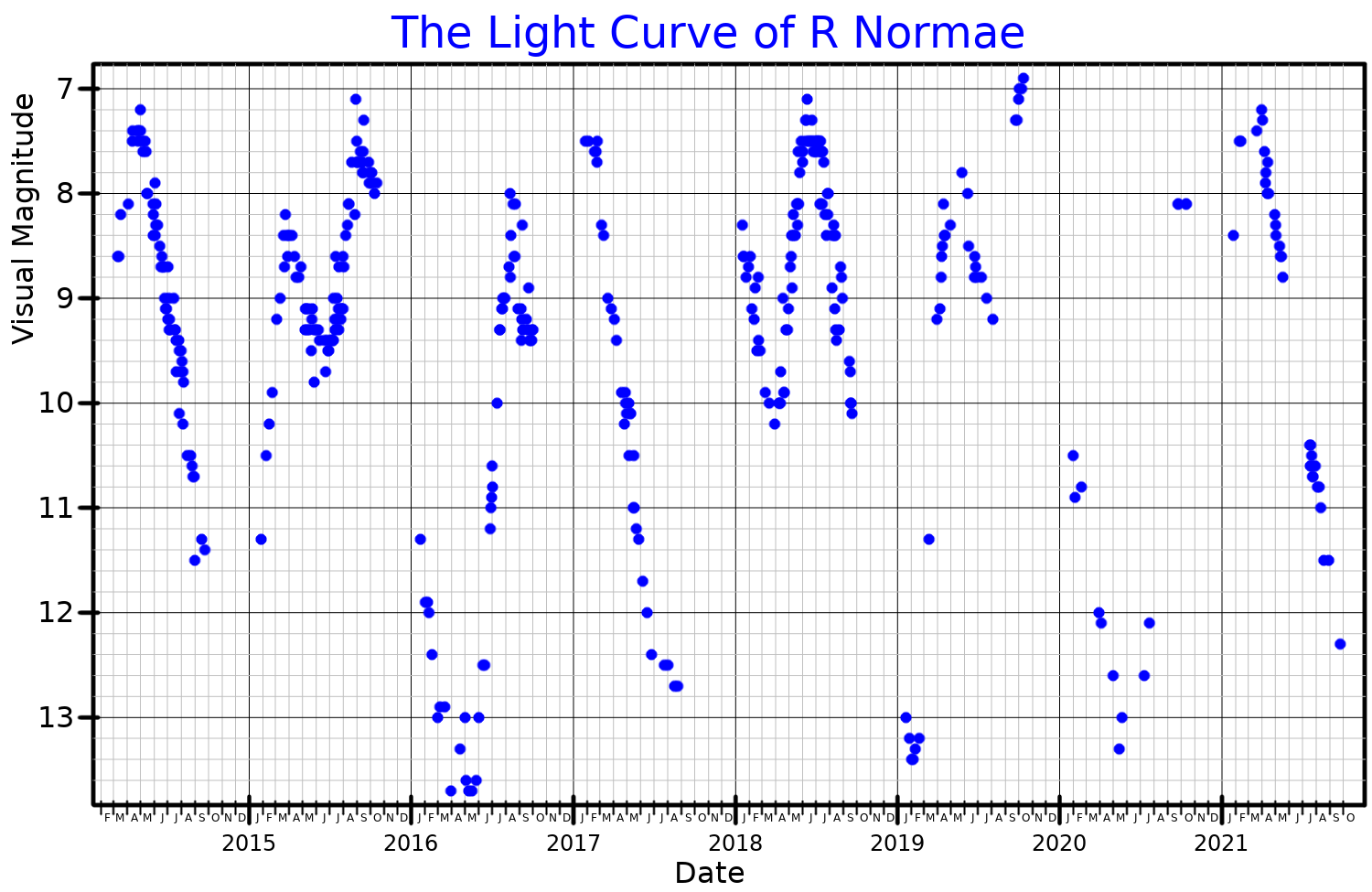
- The visual band light curve of R Normae, from AAVSO data

Observation data Epoch J2000 Equinox J2000
- Constellation: Norma
- Right ascension: 15^{h} 35^{m} 57.35429^{s}
- Declination: −49° 30′ 28.6817″
- Apparent magnitude (V): 6.5–12.8

Characteristics
- Spectral type: M3e-M7II
- U−B color index: +1.33
- B−V color index: +1.77
- Variable type: Mira

Astrometry
Radial velocity (R_{v})	−22.0 km/s
Proper motion (μ)	RA: −0.63 mas/yr Dec.: −7.09 mas/yr
Parallax (π)	1.72±2.79 mas
Distance	2,900 ly (900 pc)

Details
Mass	5.75 M_{☉}
Luminosity	7,764 L_{☉}
Surface gravity (log g)	1.30 cgs
Temperature	3,161 K
Metallicity [Fe/H]	−0.33 dex

Other designations
- R Nor, CD−49°9787, GC 20939, GSC 08304-00824, HD 138743, HIP 76377, HIC 76377, SAO 225948

Database references
SIMBAD	data

R Normae is a Mira variable star located near Eta Normae in the southern constellation of Norma. This is an intermediate-mass red giant star that is generating part of its energy through hydrogen fusion. Because this fusion is thought to be occurring under conditions of convection, it is generating an excess of lithium. The star ranges from magnitude 6.5 to 12.8 and has a relatively long period of 496 days. Located around 2,900 light-years distant, it shines with a luminosity 7764 times that of the Sun and has a surface temperature of 3161 K.
