= SP1 =

SP1 and variants may refer to:

- Bowlus SP-1 Paper Wing, glider
- SP-1 switch, a late 1960s telecommunications switch by Northern Electric
- Sp1 transcription factor, a human protein
- Dallara SP1, a race car
- Savoia-Pomilio SP.1, a reconnaissance and bomber aircraft built in Italy during the First World War
- USS Arawan II (SP-1), a motor yacht that served in the United States Navy as a patrol vessel from 1917 to 1918
- Vektor SP1/SP2, a pistol
- SP-01, a variant of the CZ 75 pistol
- Shapley 1, an annular planetary nebula in the constellation of Norma
- Service pack 1, a collection of computer program patches and alterations
- Surface Pro, a laplet by Microsoft
- Skulduggery Pleasant (novel), a young adult fiction novel by Derek Landy
- a model of steam toy made by British manufacturer Mamod
- a sink in the Sima Pumacocha, a cave in Peru
