= Zeta Normae =

Star in the constellation Norma

- Location of ζ Normae (circled)

Observation data Epoch J2000.0 Equinox J2000.0 (ICRS)
- Constellation: Norma
- Right ascension: 16^{h} 13^{m} 22.69800^{s}
- Declination: −55° 32′ 27.4108″
- Apparent magnitude (V): 5.81

Characteristics
- Spectral type: F2 III
- B−V color index: +0.34

Astrometry
Radial velocity (R_{v})	−45.6±4.3 km/s
Proper motion (μ)	RA: −98.850 mas/yr Dec.: −42.066 mas/yr
Parallax (π)	14.2047±0.0771 mas
Distance	230 ± 1 ly (70.4 ± 0.4 pc)
Absolute magnitude (M_{V})	1.67

Details
Mass	1.74 M_{☉}
Radius	3.23+0.20 −0.06 R_{☉}
Luminosity	19.434±0.133 L_{☉}
Surface gravity (log g)	3.70 cgs
Temperature	6,743+69 −200 K
Metallicity [Fe/H]	−0.21 dex
Age	1.50 Gyr

Other designations
- ζ Nor, CD−55°6596, HD 145361, HIP 79497, HR 6019, SAO 243449

Database references
SIMBAD	data

Zeta Normae, Latinised from ζ Normae, is a solitary, yellow-white hued star in the southern constellation of Norma. With an apparent visual magnitude of 5.81, it is a dim star near the lower limit of visibility for the naked eye. Based upon an annual parallax shift of 14.2 mas as seen from Earth, this system is located approximately 230 light years from the Sun. It is advancing in the general direction of the Sun with a radial velocity of −45.6 km/s.

This is an evolved F-type giant star with a stellar classification of F2 III that has swollen and cooled off the main sequence after consuming the hydrogen at its core. It is an estimated 1.5 billion years old with 1.74 times the mass of the Sun and 3.2 times the Sun's radius. Zeta Normae is radiating approximately 19 times the Sun's luminosity from its photosphere at an effective temperature of 6,743 K.
