= Lambda Normae =

Star in the constellation Norma

- Location of λ Nor (circled)

Observation data Epoch J2000 Equinox ICRS
- Constellation: Norma
- Right ascension: 16^{h} 19^{m} 17.64660^{s}
- Declination: −42° 40′ 26.3014″
- Apparent magnitude (V): 5.44 (5.83 + 6.86)

Characteristics
- Spectral type: A0V + A3V
- B−V color index: 0.099±0.004

Astrometry
| Radial velocity (R_{v}) | −15.0±3.7 km/s |
| Proper motion (μ) | RA: +7.59 mas/yr Dec.: −13.30 mas/yr |
| Parallax (π) | 9.35±0.76 mas |
| Distance | 350 ± 30 ly (107 ± 9 pc) |
| Absolute magnitude (M_{V}) | 0.31 |

Orbit
| Period (P) | 67.50 yr |
| Semi-major axis (a) | 0.293″ |
| Eccentricity (e) | 0.788 |
| Inclination (i) | 45.8° |
| Longitude of the node (Ω) | 215.2° |
| Periastron epoch (T) | 2049.59 B |
| Argument of periastron (ω) (secondary) | 82.5° |

Details
| Luminosity | 64 L_{☉} |

λ Nor A
| Mass | 2.53–2.57 M_{☉} |

λ Nor B
| Mass | 2.00–2.13 M_{☉} |

Other designations
- λ Nor, CD−42°11188, HD 146667, HIP 79963, HR 6071, SAO 226650, WDS J16193-4240

Database references
| SIMBAD | data |

λ Normae, Latinised as Lambda Normae, is a binary star system in the southern constellation of Norma, located near the northern constellation boundary with Scorpius. It is visible to the naked eye as a dim, white-hued point of light that shines with a combined apparent visual magnitude of 5.44. The system is located approximately 350 light years distant from the Sun based on parallax, but is drifting closer with a radial velocity of about −15 km/s.

The pair have an orbital period of 67.5 years with a high eccentricity of 0.788. Both components are A-type main-sequence stars that are generating energy through core hydrogen fusion. The primary component has a visual magnitude of 5.83, and is of class A0V. The fainter secondary is class A3V with a magnitude 6.86.
