= QV Normae =

Star in the constellation Norma

Observation data Epoch J2000.0 ICRS Equinox ICRS
- Constellation: Norma
- Right ascension: 15^{h} 42^{m} 23.36^{s}
- Declination: −52° 23′ 09.6″
- Apparent magnitude (V): 16.19 - 16.31

Characteristics
- Spectral type: B0Iabe

Other designations
- Norma X-2

Database references
SIMBAD	data

QV Normae, also known as Norma X-2, is a high mass X-ray binary star system in the constellation Norma. It varies between apparent magnitudes of 16.19 and 16.31.

The X-ray source was first identified in the early 1970s. The nature of the system was discovered in 1978 by astronomers who aligned a visual source of a reddened hot blue-white star with the X-ray source 4U 1538 - 52. The components are a blue-white supergiant estimated to have a mass around 20 times that of the Sun and a neutron star initially estimated at around 1.4 solar masses, later revised to 0.8 solar masses. The stellar wind from the more massive star is drawn to the magnetic poles of neutron star, forming an accretion column and producing X-rays. The system has been estimated to lie anywhere from 4500 to 6500 parsecs (15,000-20,000 light-years) from Earth.
