= 2MASS J15404342−5101357 =

Red dwarf star in the constellation Norma

2MASS J15404341−5101357
- Location of 2M1540 in the constellation Norma

Observation data Epoch J2000 Equinox ICRS
- Constellation: Norma
- Right ascension: 15^{h} 40^{m} 43.536^{s}
- Declination: −51° 01′ 35.97″
- Apparent magnitude (V): 15.26

Characteristics
- Evolutionary stage: main-sequence star
- Spectral type: M7V
- Apparent magnitude (J): 8.96

Astrometry
Radial velocity (R_{v})	50.0 km/s
Proper motion (μ)	RA: 1949.461 mas/yr Dec.: −324.789 mas/yr
Parallax (π)	187.7290±0.0496 mas
Distance	17.374 ± 0.005 ly (5.327 ± 0.001 pc)
Absolute bolometric magnitude (M_{bol})	12.81

Details
Mass	0.105 M_{☉}
Radius	0.122 R_{☉}
Luminosity	9×10^{−4} L_{☉}
Temperature	2621±100 K

Other designations
- GJ 12259, 2M1540, 2MASS J154043.42-510135.7, WISEA J154045.67-510139.3, UCAC4 195-119117, Gaia DR2 5985290231327158144

Database references
SIMBAD	data

2MASS J15404341−5101357 (abbreviated 2M1540) is a red dwarf of spectral type M7, located in Norma at 17.374 light-years (5.326 parsecs) from Earth.

== Discovery ==
Its discovery was announced in 2014 by Kirkpatrick et al. and independently by Pérez Garrido et al.

Kirkpatrick and colleagues found a few thousand new high proper motion objects under the AllWISE program of study of images, taken by Wide-field Infrared Survey Explorer (WISE). 2M1540 was one of these high proper motion objects. They named it WISEA J154045.67-510139.3 and assigned it spectral type M6.

Pérez Garrido and colleagues were looking for high proper motion sources in the 2MASS–WISE cross-match. They named it 2MASS J154043.42-510135.7 (2M1540 for short) and classified it as an M7.0±0.5 dwarf.

Since the trigonometric distance of 2M1540 agreed with its spectrophotometric distances, computed for a single object, it was concluded that it is not an equal-mass binary.
