= V378 Normae =

Star in the constellation Norma

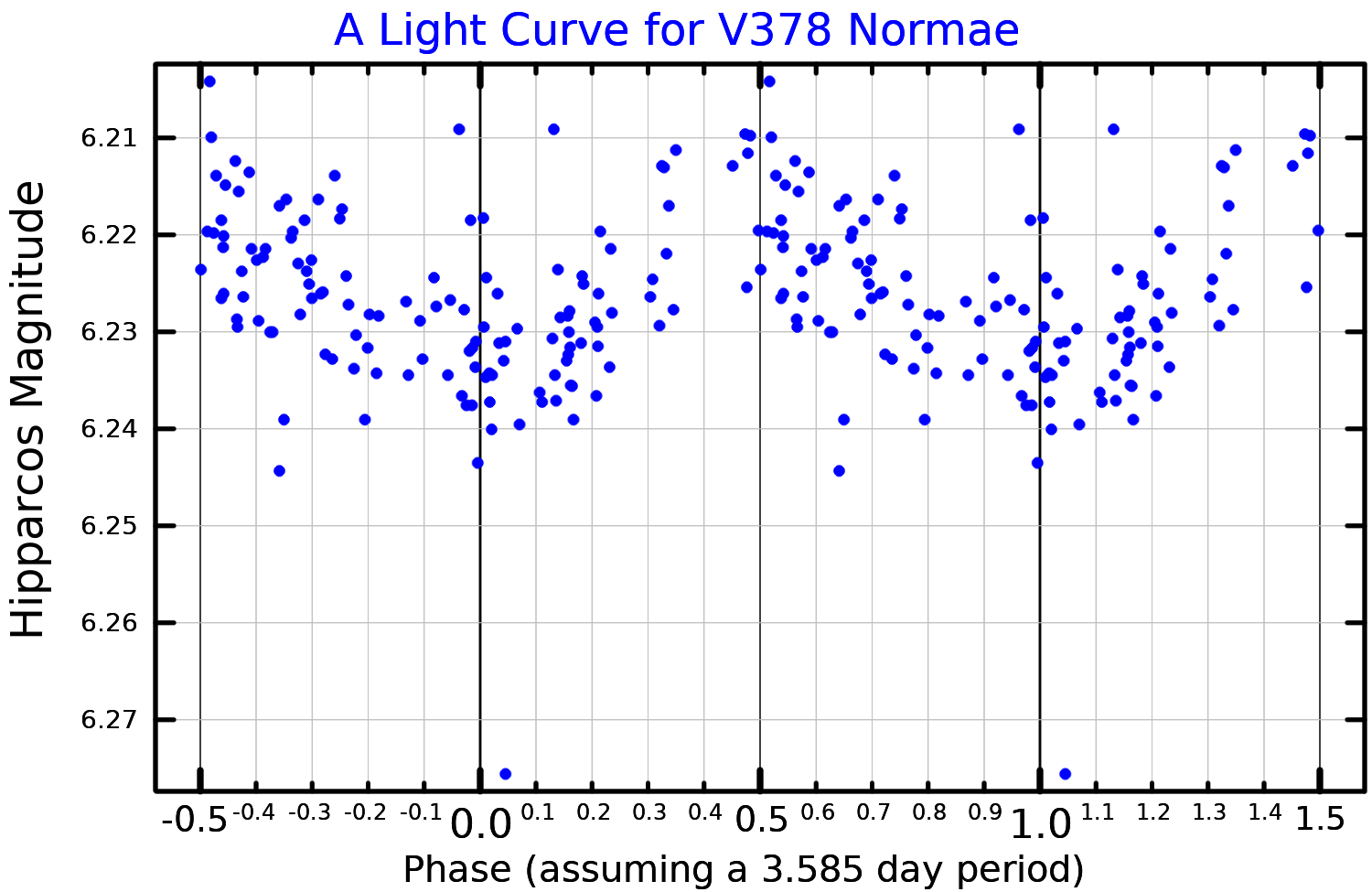
- A light curve for V378 Normae, plotted from Hipparcos data

Observation data Epoch J2000.0 Equinox J2000.0 (ICRS)
- Constellation: Norma
- Right ascension: 16^{h} 29^{m} 45.2207^{s}
- Declination: −57° 45′ 22.767″
- Apparent magnitude (V): 6.21 - 6.23

Characteristics
- Spectral type: G8Ib
- Variable type: Cepheid

Astrometry
Radial velocity (R_{v})	5.93±0.15 km/s
Proper motion (μ)	RA: −1.666 mas/yr Dec.: −2.559 mas/yr
Parallax (π)	1.0264±0.0349 mas
Distance	3,200 ± 100 ly (970 ± 30 pc)
Absolute magnitude (M_{V})	−0.078

Details
Mass	3.43 M_{☉}
Radius	115 R_{☉}
Luminosity	4,214 L_{☉}
Surface gravity (log g)	0.72 cgs
Temperature	4,335 K
Metallicity [Fe/H]	−0.25 dex

Other designations
- V378 Normae, CD−57°6417, HD 148218, HIP 80788, HR 6120

Database references
SIMBAD	data

V378 Normae (also known as HR 6120) is a supergiant star in the constellation Norma. It is a likely Cepheid variable with a range of 6.21 to 6.23 and a period of 3.5850 days. It is very faintly visible to the naked eye under excellent observing conditions.
