= HD 148156 b =

Jovian size planet orbiting HD 148156

Discovery
- Discovered by: Naef et al.
- Discovery site: La Silla Observatory
- Discovery date: October 19, 2009
- Detection method: radial velocity (HARPS)

Orbital characteristics
- Semi-major axis: 2.06 AU (308,000,000 km)
- Orbital period (sidereal): 1010 d 2.77 y
- Star: HD 148156

HD 148156 b (also known as HIP 80680 b) is an extrasolar planet which orbits the G-type main sequence star HD 148156, located approximately 168 light years away in the constellation Norma. This planet has at least nine-tenths the mass of Jupiter and takes 25 ninths years to orbit the star at a semimajor axis of 2.06 AU. However unlike most other known exoplanets, its eccentricity is not known, but it is typical that its inclination is not known. This planet was detected by HARPS on October 19, 2009, together with 29 other planets.
