= NGC 5999 =

Open cluster in the constellation Norma

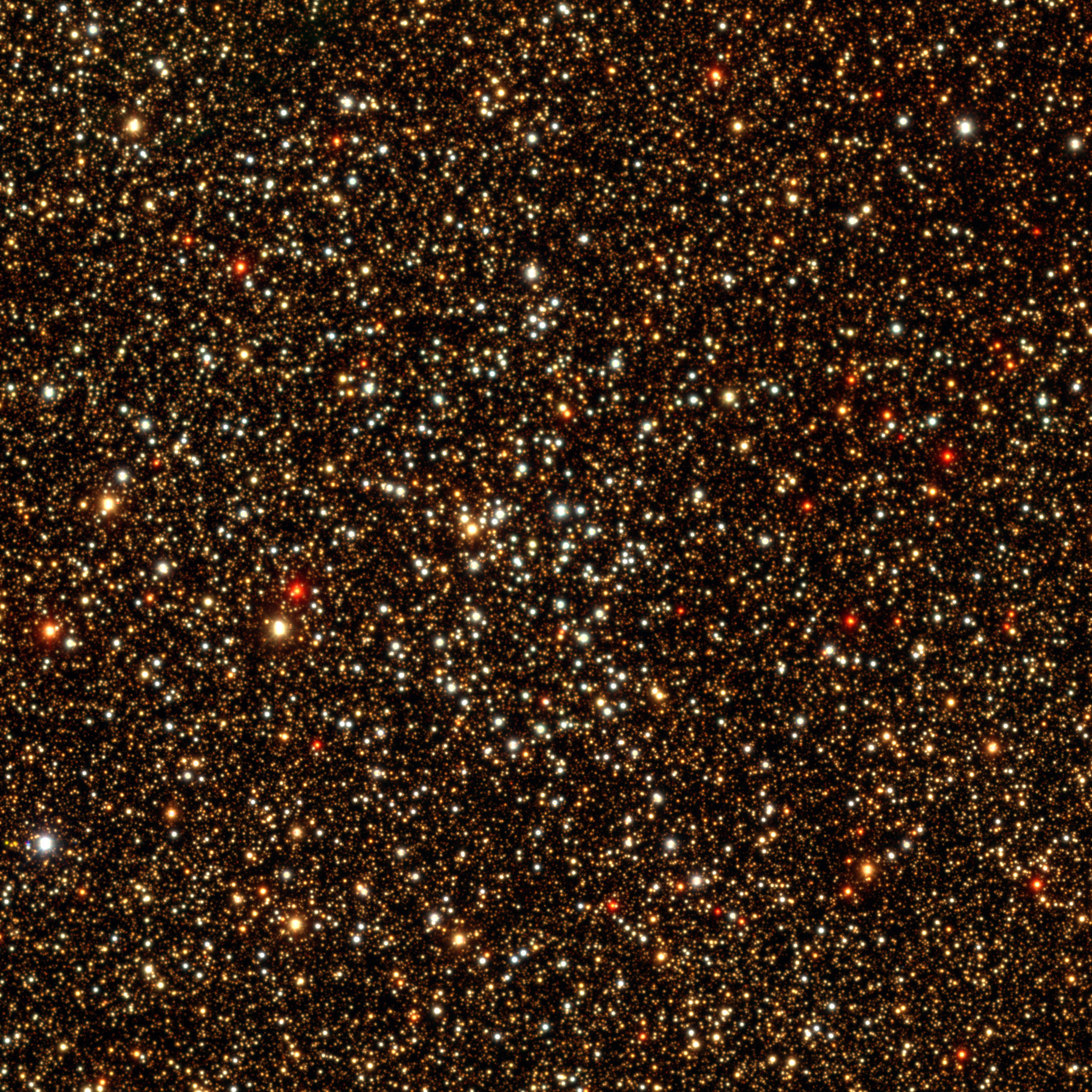
- NGC 5523; Credit: DECaPS

Observation data (J2000 epoch)
- Right ascension: 15^{h} 59^{m} 55^{s}
- Declination: −54° 01′ 54″
- Distance: 5310
- Apparent magnitude (V): 9.0

Physical characteristics
- Estimated age: 400 million years

Associations
- Constellation: Norma

NGC 5999 is an open cluster in the constellation Norma. Its brightest star is HIP 78355. It is 5310 light-years distant and thought to be around 400 million years old.
