= Gamma Normids =

Meteor shower

Gamma Normids (GNO)
- Discovery date: 1929

Radiant
- Constellation: Norma (near Gamma2 Normae)
- Right ascension: 16^{h} 24^{m}
- Declination: −51°

Properties
- Occurs during: March 7 – 23
- Date of peak: March 15
- Velocity: 68 km/s km/s
- Zenithal hourly rate: <1-2

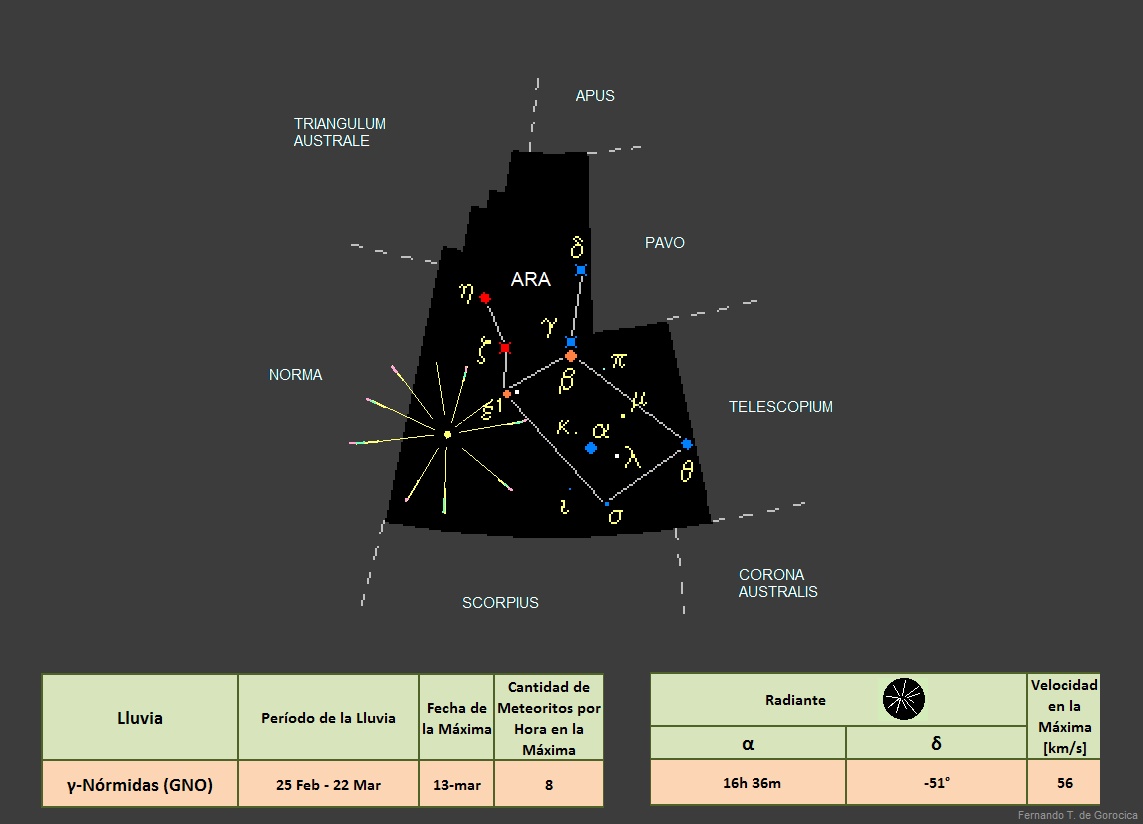
March 13th is the day when the most meteors are visible per hour. The first recorded observation of this meteor shower was made by Ronald A. McIntosh in Auckland, New Zealand, on March 13, 1929, at 2:24 a.m. During this event, the radiant, the point from which the meteors appear to originate, is located in the constellation of ARA (the Altar). It is approximately 4 degrees 13 minutes away from Epsilon Ara (Tso Kang), which is situated on the opposite side of the radiant. The radiant is the point where the Earth’s orbit intersects with that of a comet or asteroid. When these celestial bodies collide, fragments of asteroids or comet particles remain in orbit. As these particles enter the Earth’s atmosphere, they create bright streaks of light, known as meteors, that appear to originate from a single point. Although these particles enter the atmosphere simultaneously, they are perceived as coming from a single point due to the way our eyes perceive motion. This phenomenon is similar to the way closely spaced railway tracks appear to join together when viewed from a distance. Meteor showers are typically observed between midnight (00:00 a.m.) and the dawn of the day of the peak. However, the radiant must be above the Eastern horizon for the best viewing experience.

The Gamma Normids (GNO) are a weak meteor shower, active from March 7 to 23, peaking on March 15. The radiant is located near the star Gamma2 Normae in the constellation Norma.

== History ==
The first observations were made by R A McIntosh from Auckland, New Zealand in 1929, with confirmation coming from observations made by M. Geddes in 1932. The shower was virtually ignored until radar equipment used by A A Weiss in Adelaide, South Australia detected activity 15–16 March 1953. An attempt to observe the shower with radar in 1956 was unsuccessful, however the shower was observed again with radar in 1969.

Members of the Western Australia Meteor Section made extensive observations in the 1970s and 1980s. In 1983 the average magnitude of the 63 meteors was 2.68 and 9.5% had trains with the highest Zenithal Hourly Rate (ZHR) of 9.6±2.3 recorded on the night of March 13/14 . In 1986 273 meteors were observed, and the highest ZHR (3.49) was recorded on March 14/15. Nearly 20% of the meteors left trains.

In 2005 the Liga IberoAmericana De Astronomía noted meteors from this stream every night during the observation period of March 8–17. The highest number of meteors seen was 5, on the night of March 10/11 with a ZHR of 14 ± 6.
