= HD 147152 =

Star in the constellation Norma

- Location of HD 147152 (circled)

Observation data Epoch J2000 Equinox ICRS
- Constellation: Norma
- Right ascension: 16^{h} 22^{m} 27.9955^{s}
- Declination: −49° 34′ 20.468″
- Apparent magnitude (V): 5.32

Characteristics
- Spectral type: B3V or B6IV
- B−V color index: −0.05
- Variable type: possible SPB

Astrometry
Radial velocity (R_{v})	−10.0±4.2 km/s
Proper motion (μ)	RA: −11.89 mas/yr Dec.: −25.664 mas/yr
Parallax (π)	7.05±0.32 mas
Distance	460 ± 20 ly (142 ± 6 pc)
Absolute magnitude (M_{V})	−0.43

Details
Mass	5.4+0.6 −0.3 M_{☉}
Luminosity (bolometric)	741.3 L_{☉}
Rotational velocity (v sin i)	135 km/s
Age	17±3 Myr

Other designations
- CD−49°10591, CPD−49°9235, GC 21997, HD 147152, HIP 80208, HR 6083, SAO 226693

Database references
SIMBAD	data

HD 147152 (HR 6083) is a solitary bluish-white hued star in the constellation Norma. It has an apparent magnitude of 5.32, making it faintly visible to the naked eye. Parallax measurements place this object around 460 light years away, though it is approaching with a radial velocity of −10 km/s. At its current distance, HD 147152's brightness is diminished by an extinction factor of approximately 0.25 ± 0.025 due to interstellar dust.

HD 147152 has a stellar classification of B3V, indicating that is a B-type main sequence star, but is also often classified as a subgiant (B6IV). It is a proper motion member of the Scorpius-Centaurus Association, specifically belonging to the Upper Centaurus-Lupus subgroup. While it has been suggested to be a slowly pulsating B star, it is not generally accepted to be variable, with it being mostly listed as constant. It has an estimated 5.4 times the mass of the Sun, and being around 17 million years old, while radiating at approximately 741 times the luminosity of the Sun from its photosphere at an effective temperature of 13,032 K, if classified as a subgiant. As of 2024, no stellar or substellar companions have been found.
