= NGC 6167 =

Open cluster in the constellation Norma

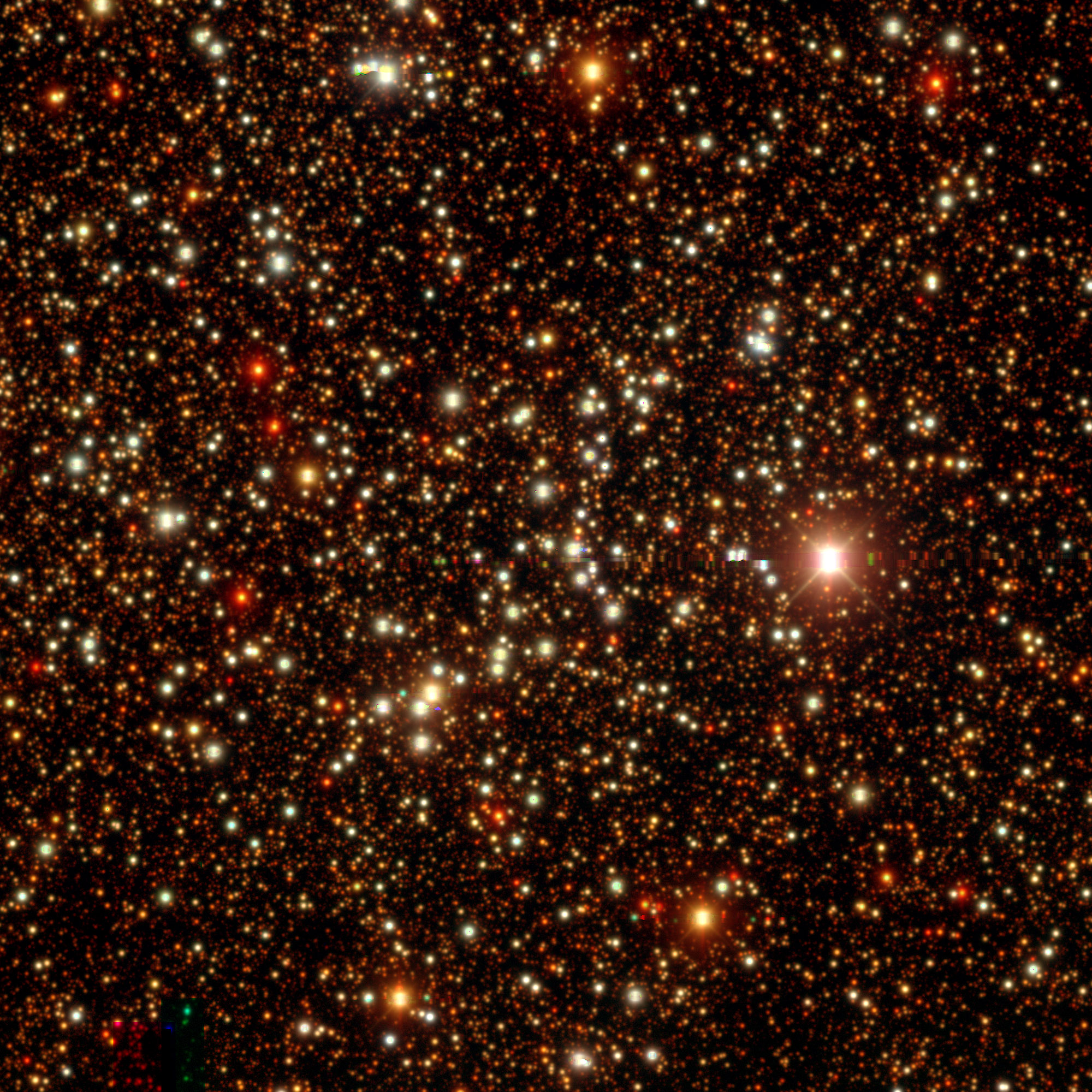
- Credit: DECaPS

Observation data (J2000 epoch)
- Right ascension: 16^{h} 34^{m} 34.(0)^{s}
- Declination: −49° 46′ 1(8)″
- Distance: 3,610 ly (1,108 pc)
- Apparent magnitude (V): 6.7
- Apparent dimensions (V): 20′

Physical characteristics
- Estimated age: 77.1 Myr
- Other designations: Cr 305, OCL 971, ESO 226-SC16, VDBH 192, C1630-495

Associations
- Constellation: Norma / Ara

NGC 6167 is an open cluster in the constellation of Norma. Viewed from Earth, it has an apparent magnitude of 6.7.
