= NGC 6134 =

Star cluster in the constellation Norma

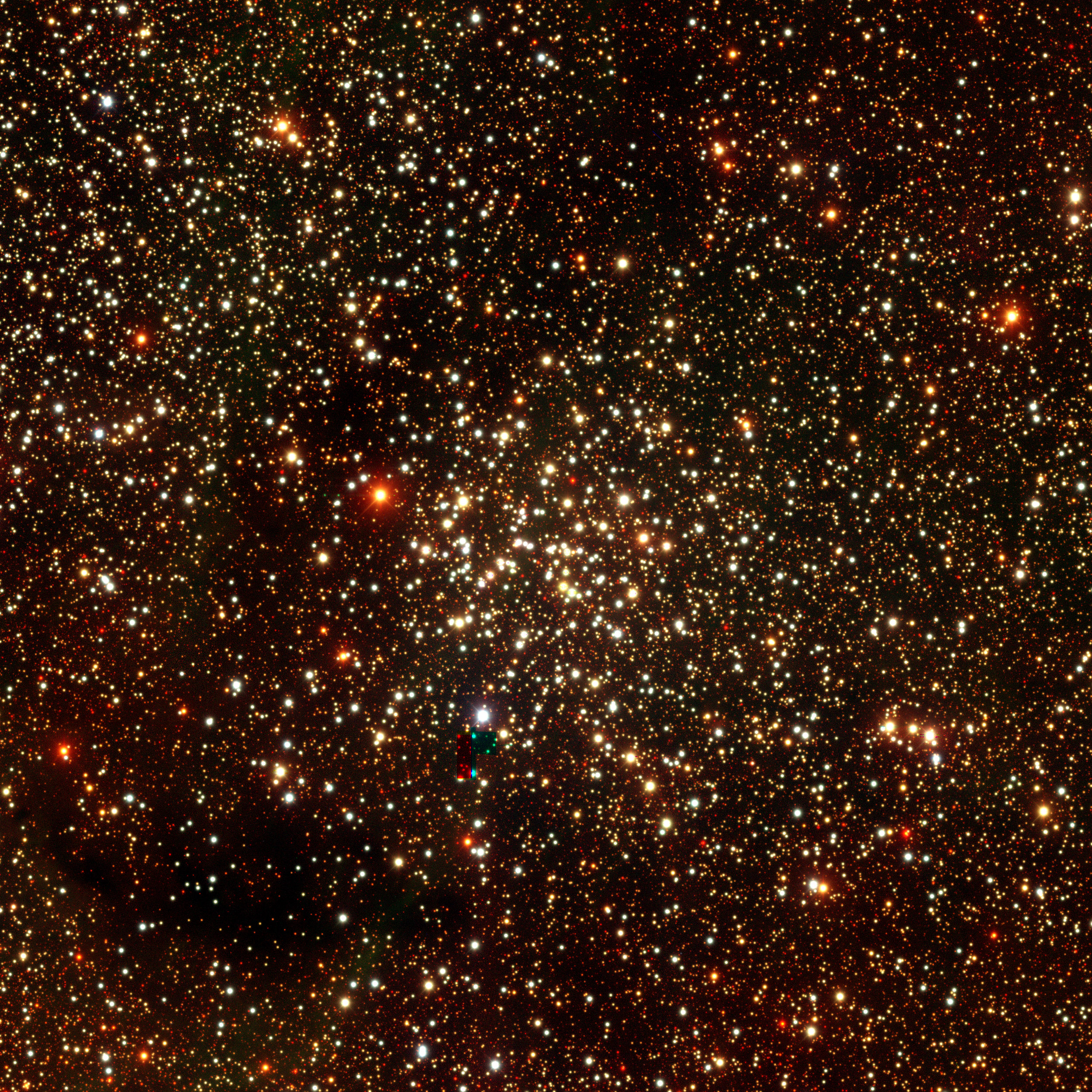
- Credit: DECaPS

Observation data (J2000 epoch)
- Right ascension: 16^{h} 27^{m} 46.5^{s}
- Declination: –49° 09′ 04″
- Apparent magnitude (V): +7.2
- Apparent dimensions (V): 2.4′

Physical characteristics
- Other designations: Cr 303

Associations
- Constellation: Norma

NGC 6134 is an open cluster in the constellation Norma. It was discovered by James Dunlop in 1826.
