= Mz 1 =

Planetary nebula in the constellation Norma

Emission nebula
- Planetary nebula
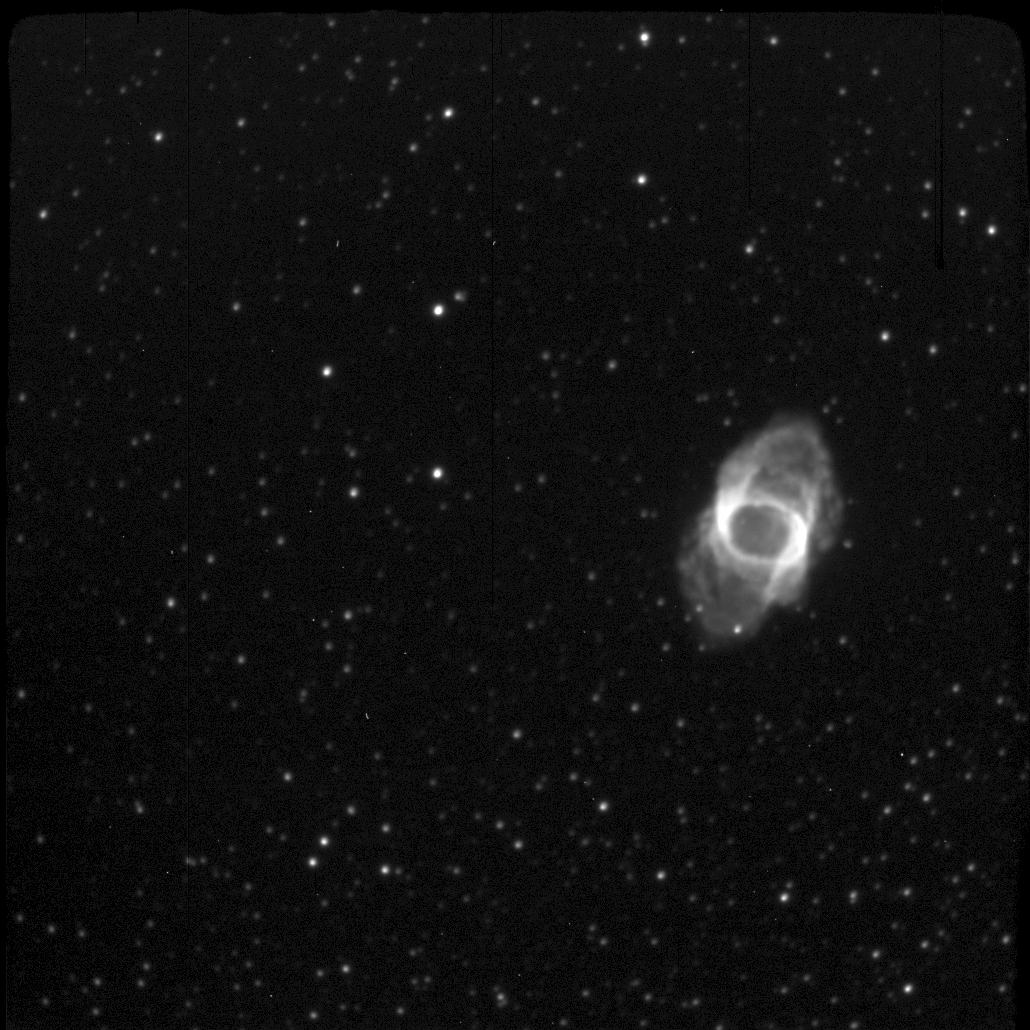

Observation data: J2000 epoch
- Right ascension: 15^{h} 34^{m} 17.002^{s}
- Declination: −59° 09′ 09.05″
- Distance: 3,400 ± 500 ly (1,050 ± 150 pc) ly
- Apparent magnitude (V): 12.0
- Apparent dimensions (V): 76″ × 23″
- Constellation: Norma

Physical characteristics
- Radius: 0.63 ± 0.09 ly^{[a]} ly
- Absolute magnitude (V): 1.9 ± 0.3^{[b]}
- Designations: ESO 135-11

Mz 1 (Menzel 1), is a bipolar planetary nebula (PN) in the constellation Norma.

== Characteristics ==
Menzel 1 is a bright planetary nebula that has a prominent central ring of enhanced emission. One model of its structure is a three-dimensional hour-glass shape with a smoothly decreasing density starting from the waist or equator as measured outwardly to the poles. It is radially expanding at a rate of about 23 km/s and estimated to be around 4,500 to 10,000 years old and has its polar axis oriented at an angle of around 40° from the plane of the sky. Its central star is estimated to have a mass of 0.63 ± 0.05 M_{☉}. In 1992 Schwarz, Corradi, & Melnick published narrow band images of Mz 1 in Hα and [OIII]. H_{2} emission was observed in Mz 1 by Webster, Payne, Storey, Dopita (1988). However, despite its relative brightness, Mz 1 has only been studied in a few papers (Monteiro et al. 2005).

== History ==
Mz 1 was discovered by Donald Howard Menzel in 1922. (Menzel 1922)

== Notes ==
1. 3,400 ± 500 ly distance × sin( 76″ diameter_angle / 2 ) = 0.63 ± 0.09 ly. radius
2. 12.0 apparent magnitude - 5 * (log_{10}(1,050 ± 150 pc distance) - 1) = 1.9 ± 0.3 absolute magnitude
