= NGC 6115 =

Star cluster in the constellation Norma

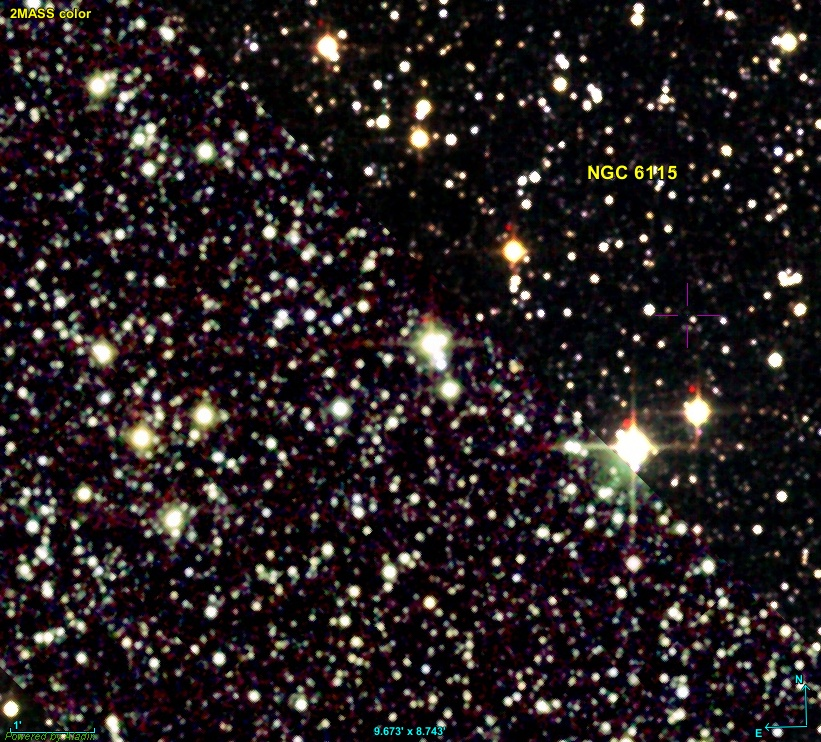

Observation data (J2000 epoch)
- Right ascension: 16^{h} 24^{m} 43.2^{s}
- Declination: −51° 56′ 24″
- Distance: 3175
- Apparent magnitude (V): 9.8

Physical characteristics
- Estimated age: 870 million years

Associations
- Constellation: Norma

NGC 6115 is an open cluster in the constellation Norma. It is located 2 degrees southeast of Gamma Normae. It is 3175 light-years distant and thought to be around 870 million years old.
