= NGC 6031 =

Open cluster in the constellation Norma

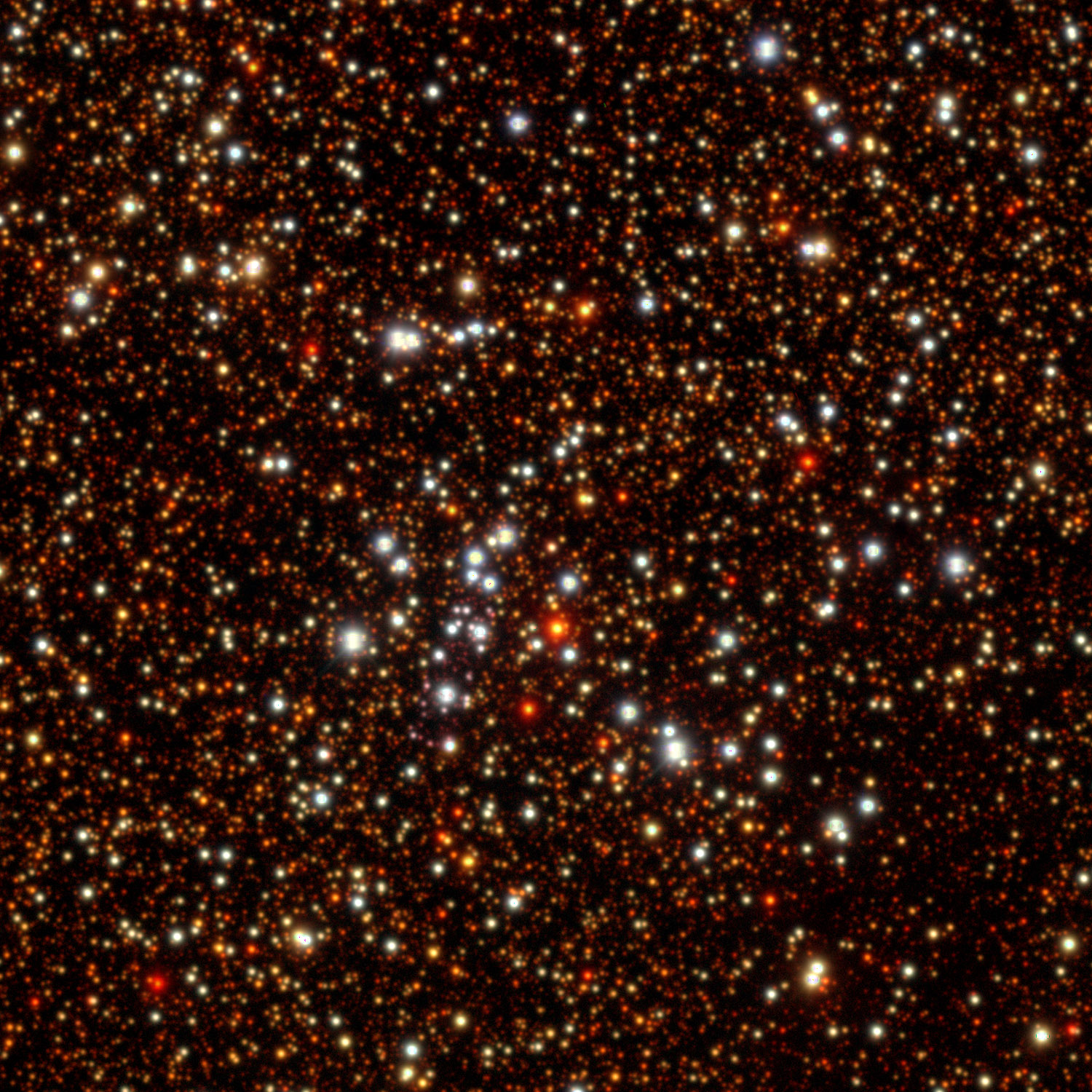
- Credit: DECaPS

Observation data (J2000 epoch)
- Right ascension: 16^{h} 07^{m} 51.4^{s}
- Declination: −54° 03′ 03″
- Distance: 6.8 ± 2.3 kly (2.08 ± 0.71 kpc)
- Apparent magnitude (V): 8.5

Physical characteristics
- Other designations: C 1603-539, Cr 297, IRAS 16039-5355, OCl 951.

Associations
- Constellation: Norma

NGC 6031 is an open cluster of stars in the constellation Norma. It has a Trumpler classification of II 2p and an age of about (250 ± 100) × 10^{6} years. The abundance of iron in this cluster matches the abundance in the Sun, indicating that the metallicity of the cluster is essentially solar.
