= Delta Normae =

Star in the constellation Norma

- Location of δ Normae (circled in red)

Observation data Epoch J2000 Equinox J2000
- Constellation: Norma
- Right ascension: 16^{h} 06^{m} 29.43692^{s}
- Declination: −45° 10′ 23.4518″
- Apparent magnitude (V): 4.74

Characteristics
- Spectral type: kA3hA7mF0 III:
- U−B color index: +0.16
- B−V color index: +0.24

Astrometry
| Radial velocity (R_{v}) | −15.5±2.8 km/s |
| Proper motion (μ) | RA: −16.19 mas/yr Dec.: −38.45 mas/yr |
| Parallax (π) | 26.66±0.74 mas |
| Distance | 122 ± 3 ly (38 ± 1 pc) |
| Absolute magnitude (M_{V}) | +1.86 |

Details
| Mass | 1.75 M_{☉} |
| Radius | 2.00 R_{☉} |
| Luminosity | 13.4 L_{☉} |
| Surface gravity (log g) | 4.04 cgs |
| Temperature | 7,691 K |
| Metallicity [Fe/H] | +0.32 dex |
| Rotational velocity (v sin i) | 7 km/s |
| Age | 62.5±12.5 Myr |

Other designations
- δ Nor, CD−44°10625, FK5 596, HD 144197, HIP 78914, HR 5980, SAO 226500

Database references
| SIMBAD | data |

Delta Normae, Latinised from δ Normae, is a star system in the southern constellation of Norma. It is visible to the naked eye with an apparent visual magnitude of 4.74. Based upon an annual parallax shift of 26.66 mas as seen from Earth, the system is located about 122 light-years distant from the Sun.

Because the proper motion of the star has been found to change over time, this is most likely an astrometric binary. The visible component is an Am star, which means it displays the spectrum of a metal-lined A-type chemically peculiar star. The stellar classification of kA3hA7mF0 III: indicates it is an evolved giant with the calcium K-lines of an A3-class star, the hydrogen lines of an A7 star, and F0-class metallic lines. It has a magnetic field with an effective strength of (169.73±151.7)×10^{−4} T.

Delta Normae has an estimated 1.75 times the mass of the Sun and twice the Sun's radius. It is around 63 million years old, and, as with other Am stars, has a relatively low spin rate with a projected rotational velocity of 7 km/s. The star is radiating 13.4 times the Sun's luminosity from its photosphere at an effective temperature of 7,691 K.
