= Theta Normae =

Star in the constellation Norma

- Location of θ Normae (circled in red)

Observation data Epoch J2000.0 Equinox J2000.0 (ICRS)
- Constellation: Norma
- Right ascension: 16^{h} 15^{m} 15.31776^{s}
- Declination: −47° 22′ 19.2716″
- Apparent magnitude (V): 5.13

Characteristics
- Evolutionary stage: main sequence
- Spectral type: B8 V
- B−V color index: −0.12

Astrometry
Radial velocity (R_{v})	+1.4±4.2 km/s
Proper motion (μ)	RA: −34.654 mas/yr Dec.: −45.784 mas/yr
Parallax (π)	8.9049±0.1072 mas
Distance	366 ± 4 ly (112 ± 1 pc)
Absolute magnitude (M_{V})	−0.23

Details
Mass	3.6 M_{☉}
Radius	3.05 R_{☉}
Luminosity	184 L_{☉}
Surface gravity (log g)	4.5 cgs
Temperature	12,341 K
Rotation	1.144 days
Rotational velocity (v sin i)	109 km/s
Age	17 Myr

Other designations
- θ Nor, CD−47°10611, HD 145842, HIP 79653, HR 6045, SAO 226600

Database references
SIMBAD	data

θ Normae, Latinised as Theta Normae, is a binary star system in the constellation Norma. It has an apparent visual magnitude of 5.13 and is visible to the naked eye as a faint, blue-white-hued point of light. Based upon an annual parallax shift of 8.9 mas as seen from Earth, this system is located about 366 light-years from the Sun. At that distance, the visual magnitude of these stars is diminished by an extinction of 0.45 due to interstellar dust.

Chini et al. (2012) identified this as a single-lined spectroscopic binary system. The visible component is a B-type main-sequence star with a stellar classification of B8 V. It is about 17 million tears old, with 3.6 times the mass of the Sun and 3.05 times the Sun's radius. It is radiating about 184 times the Sun's luminosity from its photosphere at an effective temperature of 12,341 K. It is a mercury-manganese star, a B to A-type star with overabundances of the chemical elements mercury and manganese. It takes 1.144 days to fully rotate and has a projected rotational velocity of 109 km/s, unusually fast of a HgMn star.

This system displays an infrared excess, suggesting a debris disk is orbiting at a mean radius of 21.8 AU with a temperature of 220 K.
