= T Normae =

Variable star in the constellation Norma

T Nor
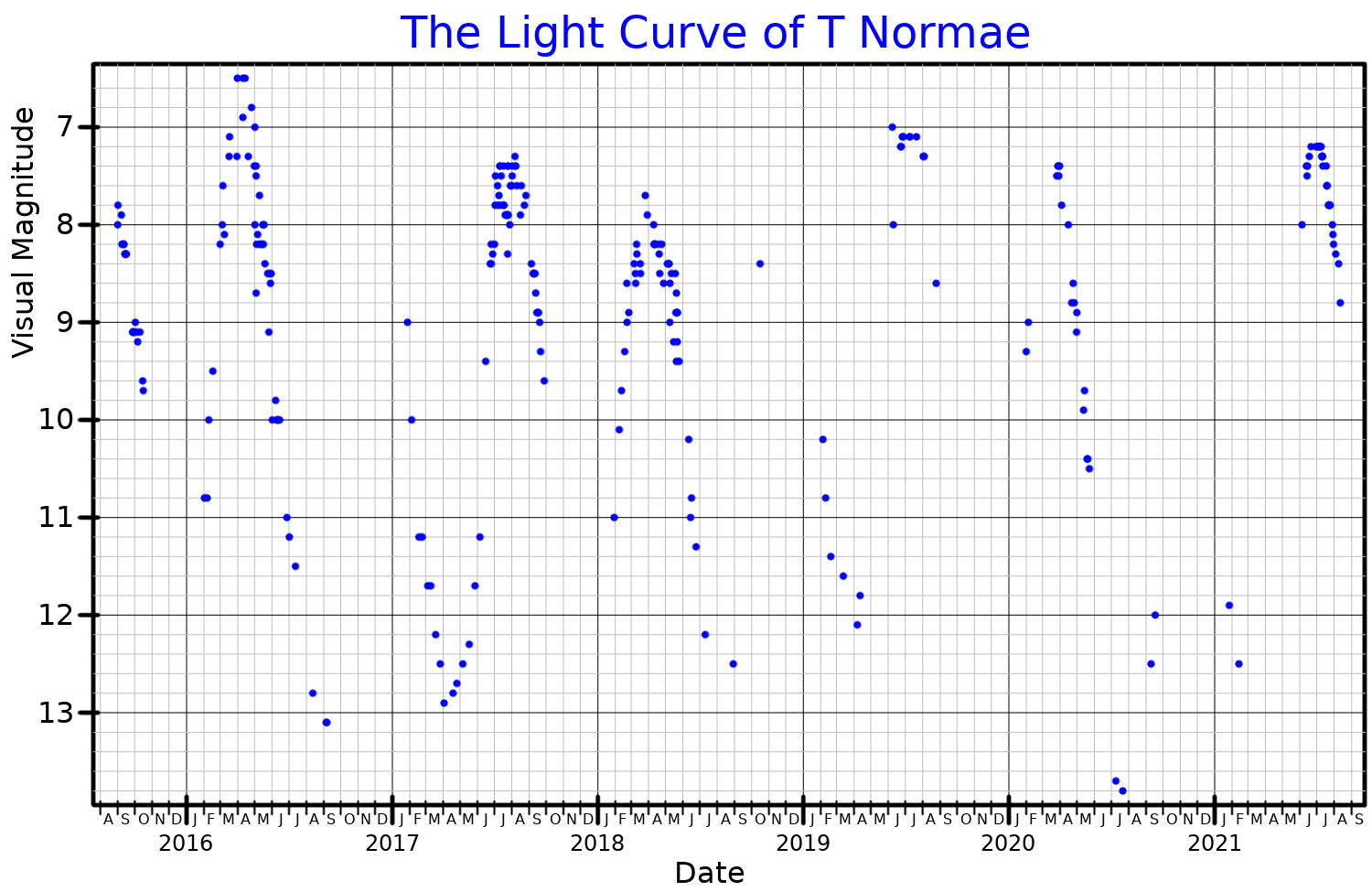
- The visual band light curve of T Normae, from AAVSO data

Observation data Epoch J2000 Equinox J2000
- Constellation: Norma
- Right ascension: 15^{h} 44^{m} 03.83966^{s}
- Declination: −54° 59′ 12.5184″
- Apparent magnitude (V): 6.2-13.6

Characteristics
- Spectral type: M3e-M6e (-M9)
- U−B color index: +0.76 - +1.09
- B−V color index: +1.42 - +1.87
- Variable type: Mira

Astrometry
Proper motion (μ)	RA: −10.02 mas/yr Dec.: −11.55 mas/yr
Parallax (π)	3.61±1.25 mas
Distance	500 pc
Absolute magnitude (M_{V})	−1.01 - 3.63

Details
Luminosity	760 L_{☉}
Temperature	3,234 K K

Other designations
- T Normae, CPD−54° 6651, HIP 77058, HD 140041, AAVSO 1536-54

Database references
SIMBAD	data

T Normae is a Mira variable star. It is located midway between Eta Normae and Gamma Circini. It ranges from magnitude 6.2 to 13.6 and a period of 244 days. Located around 900 light-years distant, it shines with a luminosity 760 times that of the Sun and has a surface temperature of 3234 K.
