= QX Normae =

Active low mass X ray binary star

Observation data Epoch J2000 Equinox ICRS
- Constellation: Norma
- Right ascension: 16^{h} 12^{m} 43.0^{s}
- Declination: −52° 25′ 23″

Astrometry
Distance	19,000 ly (58,000 pc)

Details

Neutron star
Mass	1.74 ± 0.14 M_{☉}
Radius	9.3 ± 1.0 km

Other designations
- 4U 1608-52

Database references
SIMBAD	data

QX Normae is an active low-mass X-ray binary in the constellation Norma. It is composed of a neutron star and a star smaller and cooler than the Sun. The X-ray component, known as 4U 1608–52, was discovered in the early 1970s, while the visual component, QX Normae, was discovered in 1977. By analysing the interstellar extinction between Earth and the system, Güver and colleagues calculated the most likely distance to be 5.8 kpc (19,000 light-years), and the neutron star's mass to be 1.74 ± 0.14 times that of the Sun and radius to be a mere 9.3 ± 1.0 km.

== Observations ==
On March 19, 2025, XPoSat launched by the Indian Space Research Organisation detected a rare thermonuclear “burst” peaking in just a few seconds and fading over about 20 seconds, followed about 16 minutes later by a much longer and more powerful event called a “superburst” from QX Normae. Using the XSPECT instrument aboard, detailed observations of the neutron star’s surface temperature during the bursts were taken, which reached around 20 million degrees Kelvin, with a radius close to 9.3 kilometers. The data also suggest special processes like Compton scattering might be involved in the superburst’s high brightness and slow fade. The superburst was also observed by the MAXI telescope on the ISS.
