= RZ Normae =

R Coronae Borealis variable type star in the constellation Norma

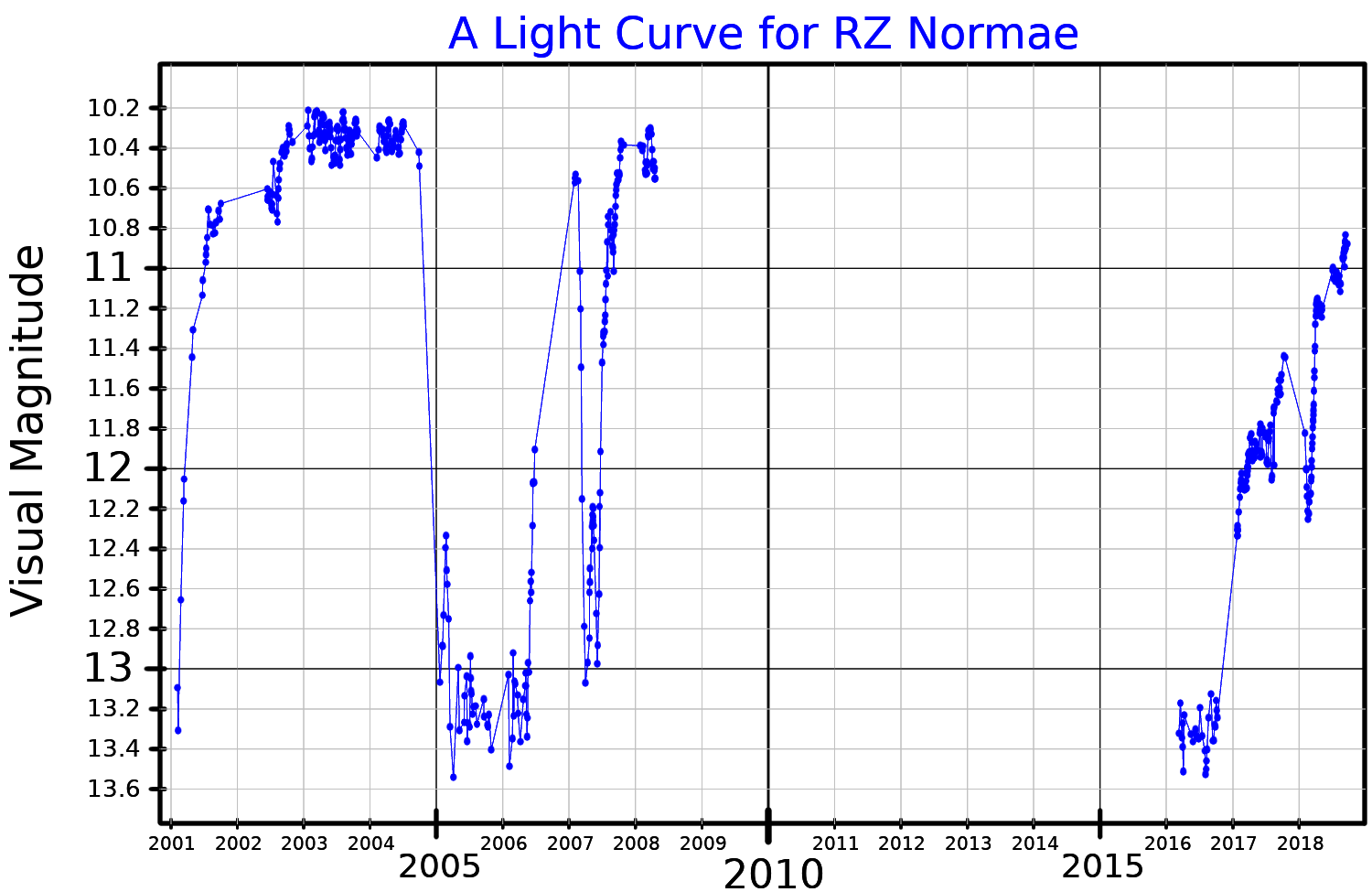
- A visual band light curve for RZ Normae, plotted from All Sky Automated Survey and ASAS-SN data

Observation data Epoch J2000.0 ICRS Equinox ICRS
- Constellation: Norma
- Right ascension: 16^{h} 32^{m} 41.66^{s}
- Declination: −53° 15′ 33.2″
- Apparent magnitude (V): 10.2 - <16.2

Characteristics
- Spectral type: C-Hd
- Variable type: R CrB variable

Astrometry

Details
Mass	0.6 M_{☉}
Temperature	6750 K

Other designations
- 2MASS J16324166-5315332

Database references
SIMBAD	data

RZ Normae is an R Coronae Borealis type variable star in the constellation Norma. It has a baseline magnitude of 10.2, dropping down to dimmer than 16.2 at its minima. It was discovered by the astronomer Sergei Gaposchkin in 1952.

It has around 60% the mass of the Sun and an effective (surface) temperature of around 6750 K.
