= QU Normae =

Star in the constellation Norma

- Location of QU Normae (circled)

Observation data Epoch J2000.0 Equinox J2000.0 (ICRS)
- Constellation: Norma
- Right ascension: 16^{h} 29^{m} 42.32777^{s}
- Declination: −46° 14′ 35.6309″
- Apparent magnitude (V): 5.37 (5.27 - 5.41)

Characteristics
- Spectral type: B1.5 Iap
- U−B color index: −0.44
- B−V color index: +0.62
- Variable type: α Cyg

Astrometry
Radial velocity (R_{v})	−14.80 ± 3.2 km/s
Proper motion (μ)	RA: −3.403 mas/yr Dec.: −4.151 mas/yr
Parallax (π)	0.6505±0.0794 mas
Distance	approx. 5,000 ly (approx. 1,500 pc)
Absolute magnitude (M_{V})	−7.50

Details
Mass	43 M_{☉}
Radius	110 (Note: Calculated using surface gravity and mass, via the equation log(R/R_{☉}) = 2.22 + 0.5 • log(M/M_{☉}) − 0.5 • log(g).) R_{☉}
Luminosity	417,000 L_{☉}
Surface gravity (log g)	2.00 cgs
Temperature	17,000 K
Rotational velocity (v sin i)	44 km/s

Other designations
- QU Normae, HD 148379, HIP 80782, HR 6131, CD−45°10697

Database references
SIMBAD	data

QU Normae, also known as HR 6131, is a blue supergiant star in the constellation Norma. It is also a variable star, thought to be an α Cyg variable.

The apparent magnitude of QU Normae varies somewhat irregularly between 5.27 and 5.41. The General Catalogue of Variable Stars quotes a period of 4.818 days, but other research only shows likely periods longer than 10 days.

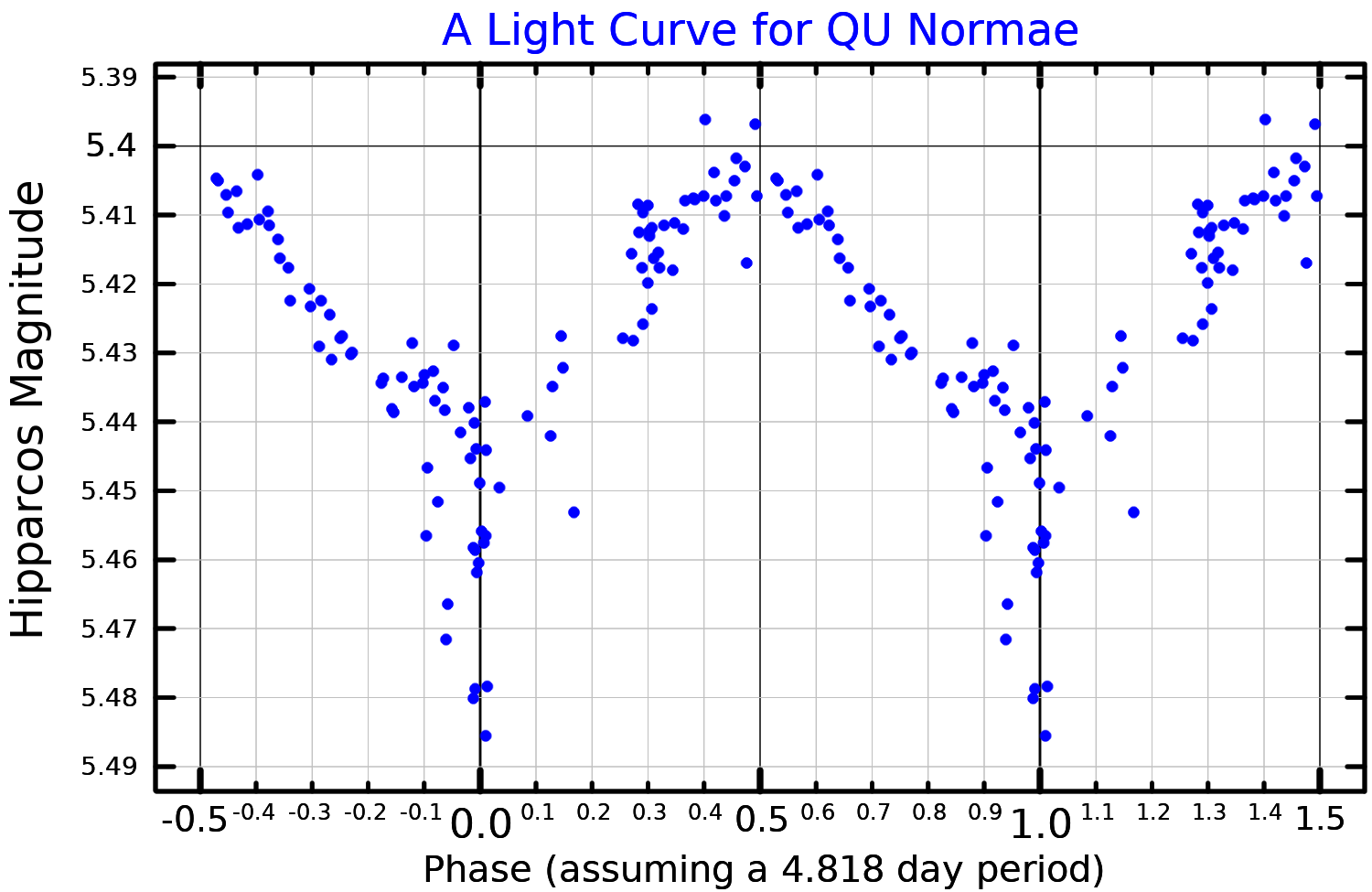
A light curve for QU Normae, plotted from Hipparcos data

QU Normae has a spectral type B1.5 Ia, a luminous supergiant that has swollen and cooled off the main sequence. Surface abundances suggest that it has not yet passed through a red supergiant phase. Around 5,000 light-years distant, it shines with a luminosity approximately 417,000 times that of the Sun and has a diameter around 110 times that of the Sun.
