= HD 148156 =

Star in the constellation Norma

Observation data Epoch J2000.0 Equinox J2000.0
- Constellation: Norma
- Right ascension: 16^{h} 28^{m} 17.285^{s}
- Declination: −46° 19′ 03.46″
- Apparent magnitude (V): 7.69

Characteristics
- Evolutionary stage: main sequence
- Spectral type: G0/2V
- Apparent magnitude (B): 8.250
- Apparent magnitude (J): 6.688±0.018
- Apparent magnitude (H): 6.489±0.024
- Apparent magnitude (K): 6.397±0.023
- B−V color index: 0.560±0.009

Astrometry
Radial velocity (R_{v})	−1.806±0.0015 km/s
Proper motion (μ)	RA: +45.530 mas/yr Dec.: +27.874 mas/yr
Parallax (π)	17.5072±0.0194 mas
Distance	186.3 ± 0.2 ly (57.12 ± 0.06 pc)
Absolute magnitude (M_{V})	4.13

Details
Mass	1.22±0.01 M_{☉}
Radius	1.19±0.02 R_{☉} 1.302^{+0.083}_{−0.041} R_{☉}
Luminosity	1.84±0.03 L_{☉} 2.278±0.008 L_{☉}
Surface gravity (log g)	4.36±0.01 cgs
Temperature	6,156±23 K
Metallicity [Fe/H]	0.29±0.02 dex
Rotational velocity (v sin i)	5.70±1.0 km/s
Age	1.20±0.50 Gyr

Other designations
- CD−46°10768, HD 148156, HIP 80680, SAO 226791, PPM 321761

Database references
SIMBAD	data
Exoplanet Archive	data

HD 148156 is a star with an orbiting exoplanet in the southern constellation of Norma. It is located at a distance of 186 light years away from the Sun, but is drifting closer with a radial velocity of –1.8 km/s. The star has an apparent visual magnitude of 7.69, which is too dim to be visible to the naked eye. A survey in 2015 ruled out the existence of any stellar companions at projected distances from 49 to 345 astronomical units.

The spectrum of this star presents as an ordinary G-type main-sequence star with a stellar classification of G0/2V, although Naef and associates in 2010 listed a similar class of F8V. A solar-type star, it is estimated to be approximately 1.2 billion years old and is spinning with a projected rotational velocity of 6 km/s. There is only a very low level of magnetic activity in the star's chromosphere. Its metallicity, as measured by the abundance of iron, is almost twice solar. The star has 1.2 times the mass and 1.2 to 1.3 times the radius of the Sun. It is radiating 1.84 to 2.28 times the luminosity of the Sun from its photosphere at an effective temperature of 6,156 K.

== Planetary system ==
In 2009, a gas giant planet was found in an eccentric orbit around the star. It may be orbiting within the habitable zone of this star based on incident flux.

The HD 148156 planetary system
Companion (in order from star)	Mass	Semimajor axis (AU)	Orbital period (days)	Eccentricity	Inclination (°)	Radius
b	≥ 0.85+0.67 −0.05 M_{J}	2.45+0.04 −0.05	1,027±28	0.52+0.04 −0.09	—	—

== See also ==
- List of extrasolar planets
