= Iota2 Normae =

Star in the constellation Norma

ι^{2} Normae
- Location of ι^{2} Normae (circled)

Observation data Epoch J2000.0 Equinox J2000.0 (ICRS)
- Constellation: Norma
- Right ascension: 16^{h} 09^{m} 18.54876^{s}
- Declination: −57° 56′ 03.5420″
- Apparent magnitude (V): 5.57

Characteristics
- Evolutionary stage: main sequence
- Spectral type: B9.5 V
- B−V color index: 0.04

Astrometry
Radial velocity (R_{v})	0.00±0.37 km/s
Proper motion (μ)	RA: −13.35±0.48 mas/yr Dec.: −59.33±0.46 mas/yr
Parallax (π)	11.65±0.57 mas
Distance	280 ± 10 ly (86 ± 4 pc)
Absolute magnitude (M_{V})	+0.91

Details
Mass	2.6 M_{☉}
Radius	2.6 R_{☉}
Luminosity	49 L_{☉}
Surface gravity (log g)	4.15 cgs
Temperature	10,186±120 K
Rotational velocity (v sin i)	111 km/s
Age	257 Myr

Other designations
- ι^{2} Nor, CPD−57°7613, FK5 3273, HD 144480, HIP 79153, HR 5994, SAO 243368

Database references
SIMBAD	data

ι^{2} Normae, Latinised as Iota^{2} Normae, is a single, blue-white star located in the southern constellation of Norma. It is positioned to the west of Rigil Kentaurus but can be difficult to spot against the Milky Way. It is faintly visible to the naked eye with an apparent visual magnitude of +5.57. Measuring its parallax reveals it is located 280±10 light-years away from the sun. At that distance, the visual magnitude is diminished by an interstellar extinction factor of 0.24 due to intervening dust. The radial velocity of this star is zero, indicating it is neither moving toward nor away from the Sun.

Iota^{2} Normae is a B-type main-sequence star with a stellar classification of B9.5 V. It is larger than the Sun with 2.6 times the mass of the Sun and about 2.6 times the Sun's radius. The star is estimated to be 257 million years old and is spinning with a projected rotational velocity of 111 km/s. It is radiating approximately 49 times the Sun's luminosity from its photosphere at an effective temperature of 10,186 K.
