= Gamma1 Normae =

Star in the constellation Norma

Gamma^{1} Normae
- Location of γ^{1} Nor (circled)

Observation data Epoch J2000 Equinox J2000
- Constellation: Norma
- Right ascension: 16^{h} 17^{m} 00.93411^{s}
- Declination: −50° 04′ 05.2333″
- Apparent magnitude (V): 4.98

Characteristics
- Evolutionary stage: Supergiant
- Spectral type: F9 Ia
- U−B color index: +0.49
- B−V color index: +0.80

Astrometry
Radial velocity (R_{v})	−16.0±5.1 km/s
Proper motion (μ)	RA: −1.69 mas/yr Dec.: −3.39 mas/yr
Parallax (π)	2.22±0.27 mas
Distance	approx. 1,500 ly (approx. 450 pc)
Absolute magnitude (M_{V})	−3.62

Details
Mass	5.37+0.61 −0.04 M_{☉}
Radius	57±2 R_{☉}
Luminosity	1,787+111 −109 L_{☉}
Surface gravity (log g)	2.0 cgs
Temperature	6,068 K
Metallicity [Fe/H]	−0.13 dex
Age	53.4±7.4 Myr

Other designations
- γ Nor, CD−49°10474, HD 146143, HIP 79790, HR 6058, SAO 226619

Database references
SIMBAD	data

Gamma^{1} Normae, Latinized from γ^{1} Normae, is a single, yellow-white hued star in the southern constellation of Norma. It is faintly visible to the naked eye with an apparent visual magnitude of 4.98. The annual parallax shift is only 2.22±0.27 mas as measured from Earth, which yields a rough distance estimate of 1,500 light years from the Sun. It is moving closer to the Sun with a radial velocity of around -16 km/s.

This is an F-type supergiant star with a stellar classification of F9 Ia It has 5.4 times the mass of the Sun and has expanded to about 57 times the Sun's radius. The star is radiating 1,787 times the Sun's luminosity from its enlarged photosphere at an effective temperature of 6,068 K. It is estimated to be around 53 million years old.

γ^{2} Nor is a nearby star nearly a magnitude brighter.
