= RT Normae =

R Coronae Borealis variable star in the constellation Norma

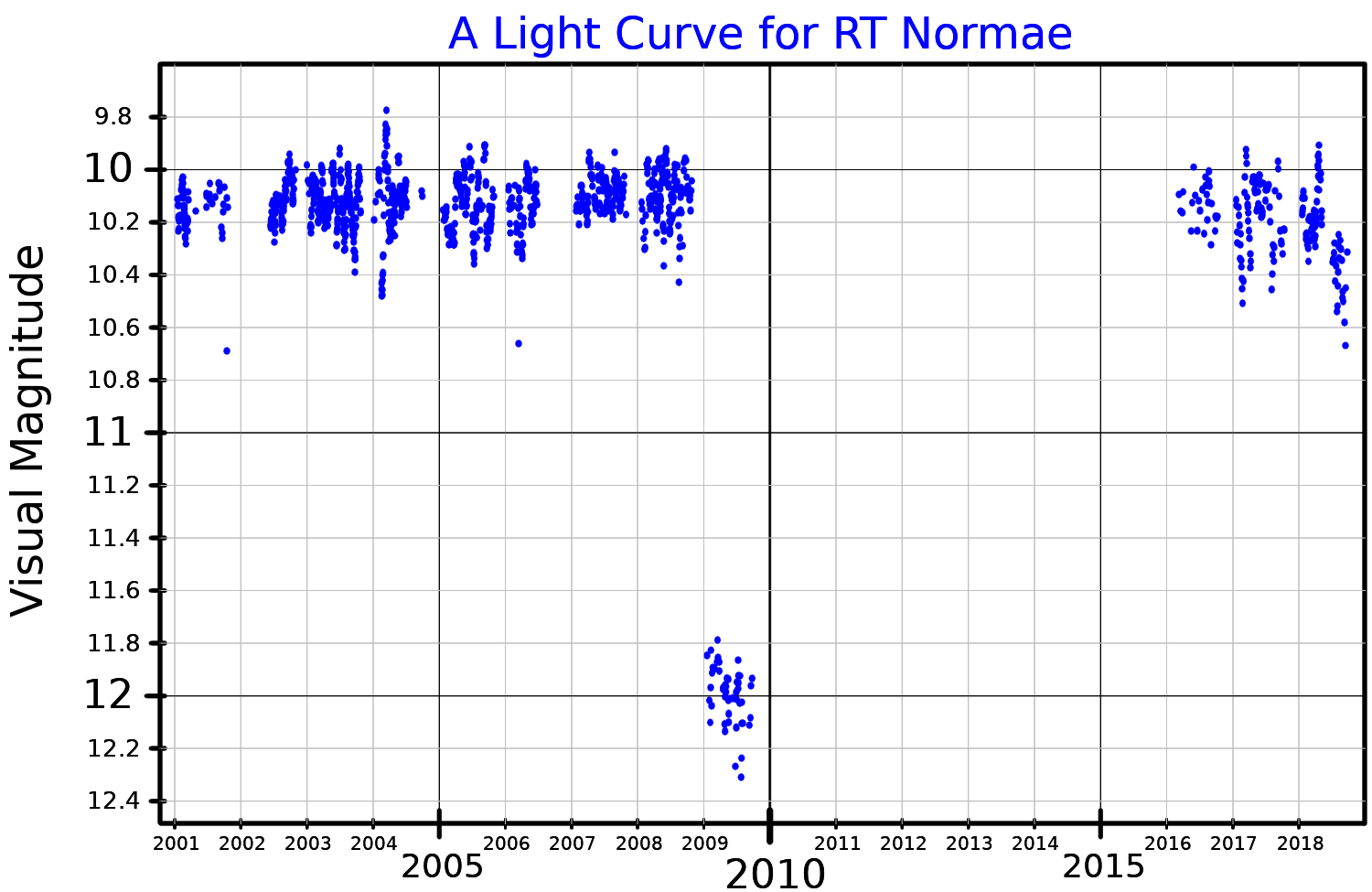
- A visual band light curve for RT Normae, plotted from ASAS and ASAS-SN data

Observation data Epoch J2000.0 ICRS Equinox J2000.0 ICRS
- Constellation: Norma
- Right ascension: 16^{h} 24^{m} 18.65396^{s}
- Declination: −59° 20′ 38.6476″
- Apparent magnitude (V): 9.8-14.7

Characteristics
- Spectral type: C (R)
- Variable type: R CrB variable

Astrometry
Parallax (π)	27.29±17.10 mas
Distance	approx. 120 ly (approx. 40 pc)

Details
Mass	<0.55 M_{☉}
Temperature	7000 K

Other designations
- HIP 80365, CPD-59 6719

Database references
SIMBAD	data

RT Normae is an R Coronae Borealis type variable star in the constellation Norma. It has a baseline magnitude of 9.8, dropping down to 14.7 at its minima.

It has less than 55% the mass of the Sun and an effective (surface) temperature of around 7000 K.
