= Shapley 1 =

Planetary nebula in the constellation Norma

Shapley 1/Sp 1
Emission nebula
- Planetary nebula
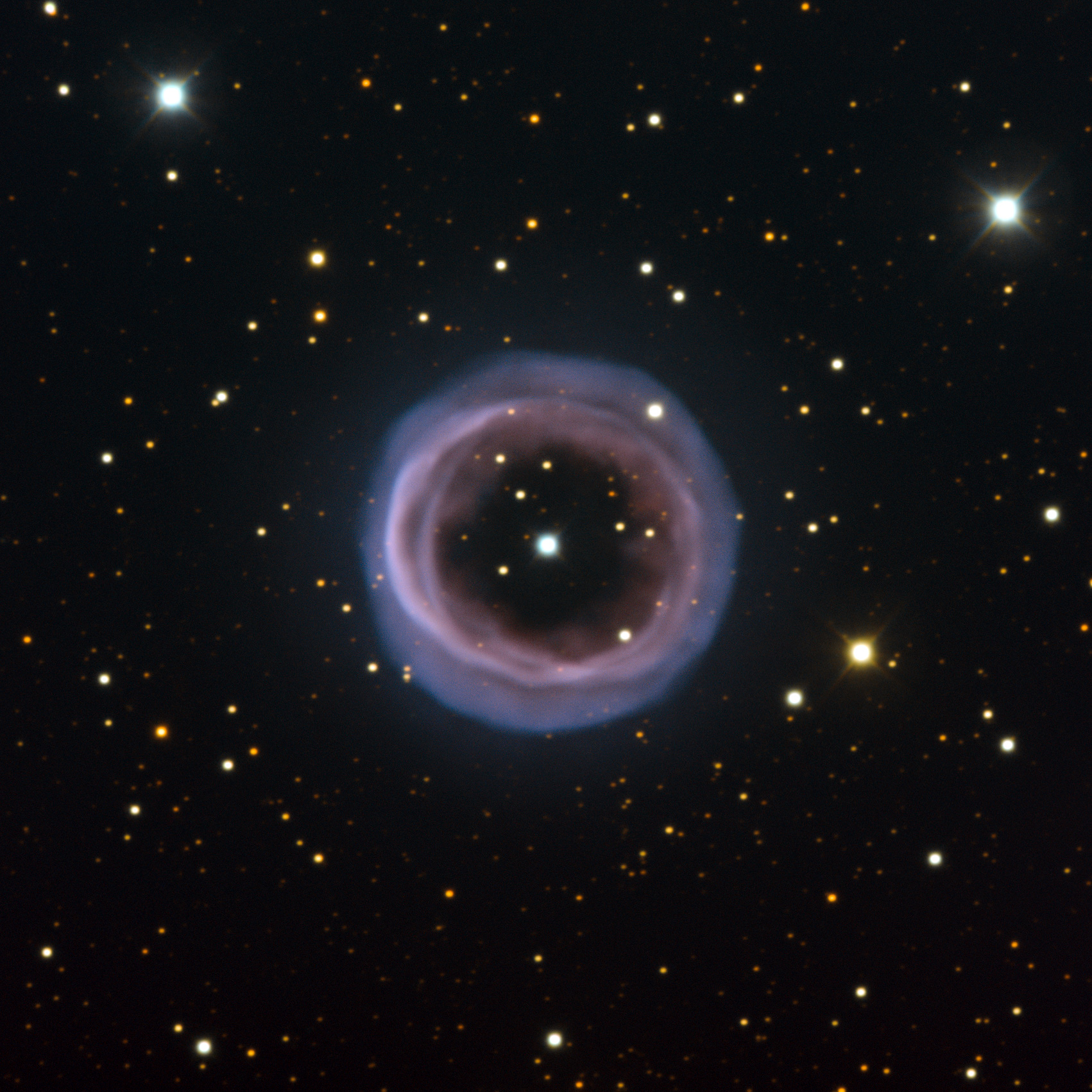
- Fine Ring Nebula — captured here by the ESO Faint Object Spectrograph and Camera mounted on the New Technology Telescope at the La Silla Observatory in Chile. Credit ESO.

Observation data: J2000 epoch
- Right ascension: 15^{h} 51^{m} 42.75^{s}
- Declination: −51° 31′ 30.5″
- Distance: ~4900 ly
- Apparent magnitude (V): 12.6
- Apparent dimensions (V): 1.1'
- Constellation: Norma

Physical characteristics
- Radius: 0.8 ly
- Notable features: Central star is a white dwarf with a magnitude of 14.
- Designations: PLN 329+2.1, RCW 100

Shapley 1 (Sp 1 or PLN 329+2.1) is an annular planetary nebula in the constellation of Norma with a magnitude of +12.6. As viewed from Earth, it is peculiar in that it seems to be a non-bipolar, torus-shaped planetary nebula. However, it is thought that this is due to the viewpoint of looking directly down on a binary system whose orbit is perpendicular to Earth.

Discovered in 1936 by Harlow Shapley, it is approximately 4900 light years from Earth, and is around 8700 years old. At the center of the nebula is a magnitude 14 white dwarf star. It has an angular diameter of 1.1 arc minutes, which makes it about one-third (.32) of a light year across.
