= Norma Arm =

Minor spiral arm of the Milky Way galaxy

Diagram of the Milky Way's spiral arms

The Norma Arm is a minor spiral arm of the Milky Way extending from and around its central hub region. The inner portion of the Arm is called the Norma Arm in narrow meaning. The outer end of it is identified either with the Cygnus Arm (not to be confused with local and minor Orion-Cygnus Arm), that lies outside the Perseus Arm, or the Outer Arm, which is located further away from the center of the Galaxy than the Cygnus Arm. The Norma Arm begins 2.2 kpc from the Galactic Center, and extends outward to a radius of 15.5±2.8 kpc. It is named for the constellation Norma, through which the Arm passes as seen from Earth.

Like many other galaxies of similar type, the Milky Way consists of a large mass of stars shaped into the form of a relatively flat disc by gravity. The disc is rotating, with the dense central body of stars moving at greater speeds than those toward the rim of the disc. As a result, the pattern of stars within the Galaxy as viewed from directly above or below the disc has formed into a spiral.

Due to localised gravitational variations, the spiral pattern has formed several distinct 'spiral arms', where particularly large numbers of stars can be found.

== See also ==
- Galactic disc
