= SGR J1550−5418 =

Star in the constellation Norma

SGR J1550−5418 is a soft gamma repeater (SGR), the sixth to be discovered, located in the constellation Norma. Long known as an X-ray source, it was noticed to have become active on 23 October 2008, and then after a relatively quiescent interval, became much more active on 22 January 2009. It has been observed by the Swift satellite, and by the Fermi Gamma-ray Space Telescope, launched in 2008, as well as in X-ray and radio emission. It has been observed to emit intense bursts of gamma rays at a rate of up to several per minute. At its estimated distance of 30,000 light years (~10 kpc), the most intense flares equal the total energy emission of the Sun in ~20 years.

The underlying object is believed to be a rotating neutron star, of the type known as magnetars, which have magnetic fields up to 10^{15} gauss, about 1000 times that of more typical neutron star X-ray sources. See orders of magnitude (magnetic field) for examples of other magnetic field strengths.

The rotation period, ~2.07 s, is the fastest yet observed for a magnetar.

The first observation of "light echos" from a gamma-ray source, a phenomenon long known for visible stars such as novas, was observed from SGR J1550−5418.

The location of SGR J1550−5418 (aka AXP 1E 1547.0-5408), is RA(J2000) = 15h50m54.11s, Dec(J2000) = −54°18'23.7".
