= Epsilon Normae =

Triple star system in the constellation Norma

- Location of ε Normae (circled in red)

Observation data Epoch J2000.0 Equinox ICRS
- Constellation: Norma
- A
- Right ascension: 16^{h} 27^{m} 11.04161^{s}
- Declination: −47° 33′ 17.2571″
- Apparent magnitude (V): 4.47
- B
- Right ascension: 16^{h} 27^{m} 10.06643^{s}
- Declination: −47° 32′ 56.6763″
- Apparent magnitude (V): 6.13

Characteristics
- Spectral type: B4 V + B4 V + B9 V
- U−B color index: −0.54
- B−V color index: −0.07

Astrometry

A
| Radial velocity (R_{v}) | −12.5±2.7 km/s |
| Proper motion (μ) | RA: −12.049 mas/yr Dec.: −20.278 mas/yr |
| Parallax (π) | 5.2390±0.1514 mas |
| Distance | 620 ± 20 ly (191 ± 6 pc) |
| Absolute magnitude (M_{V}) | +0.06 |

B
| Radial velocity (R_{v}) | −6.67±0.83 km/s |
| Proper motion (μ) | RA: −10.393 mas/yr Dec.: −20.277 mas/yr |
| Parallax (π) | 5.4467±0.0299 mas |
| Distance | 599 ± 3 ly (184 ± 1 pc) |

Orbit
| Primary | Aa |
| Secondary | Ab |
| Period (P) | 3.2617 d |
| Eccentricity (e) | 0.13 |
| Periastron epoch (T) | 2438825.9310 JD |
| Argument of periastron (ω) (secondary) | 271.5° |
| Semi-amplitude (K_{1}) (primary) | 122.5 km/s |
| Semi-amplitude (K_{2}) (secondary) | 132.9 km/s |

Details

Aa
| Mass | 7.7 M_{☉} |

Ab
| Mass | 4.5 M_{☉} |

B
| Mass | 2.3 M_{☉} |
| Radius | 2.4 R_{☉} |
| Luminosity | 74 L_{☉} |
| Surface gravity (log g) | 4.00 cgs |
| Temperature | 11,104 K |

Other designations
- ε Nor, WDS J16272-4733
- A: Yaqana, CD−47°10765, HD 147971, HIP 80582, HR 6115, SAO 226773
- B: CD−47°10764, HD 147970, HIP 80579, SAO 226772

Database references
| SIMBAD | A |
- B

Epsilon Normae, Latinised from ε Normae, also named Yaqana, is a blue-white hued triple star system in the southern constellation of Norma. It has an apparent visual magnitude of 4.47, which is bright enough to be seen with the naked eye. Based upon an annual parallax shift of 5.24 mas as seen from Earth, the system is located around 620 light-years distant from the Sun. At that distance, the visual magnitude is diminished by an extinction factor of 0.21 due to interstellar dust.

The inner pair form a double-lined spectroscopic binary system with an orbital period of 3.26 days and an eccentricity of 0.13. Both stars appear to be similar B-type main-sequence stars with stellar classifications of B4 V.

The third component, at an angular separation of 22.8 arc seconds from the inner pair, is HD 147970. It is most likely is a smaller B-type main sequence star of spectral type B9V.

Yaqana, the llama, is an Inca dark constellation in an area between Centaurus and Scorpius, including Norma. Near it is a smaller dark constellation called Uñallamacha, the cria (baby llama). The IAU Working Group on Star Names adopted the name Yaqana for ε Normae Aa on 18 June 2026.
