= IM Normae =

Recurrent nova in the constellation Norma

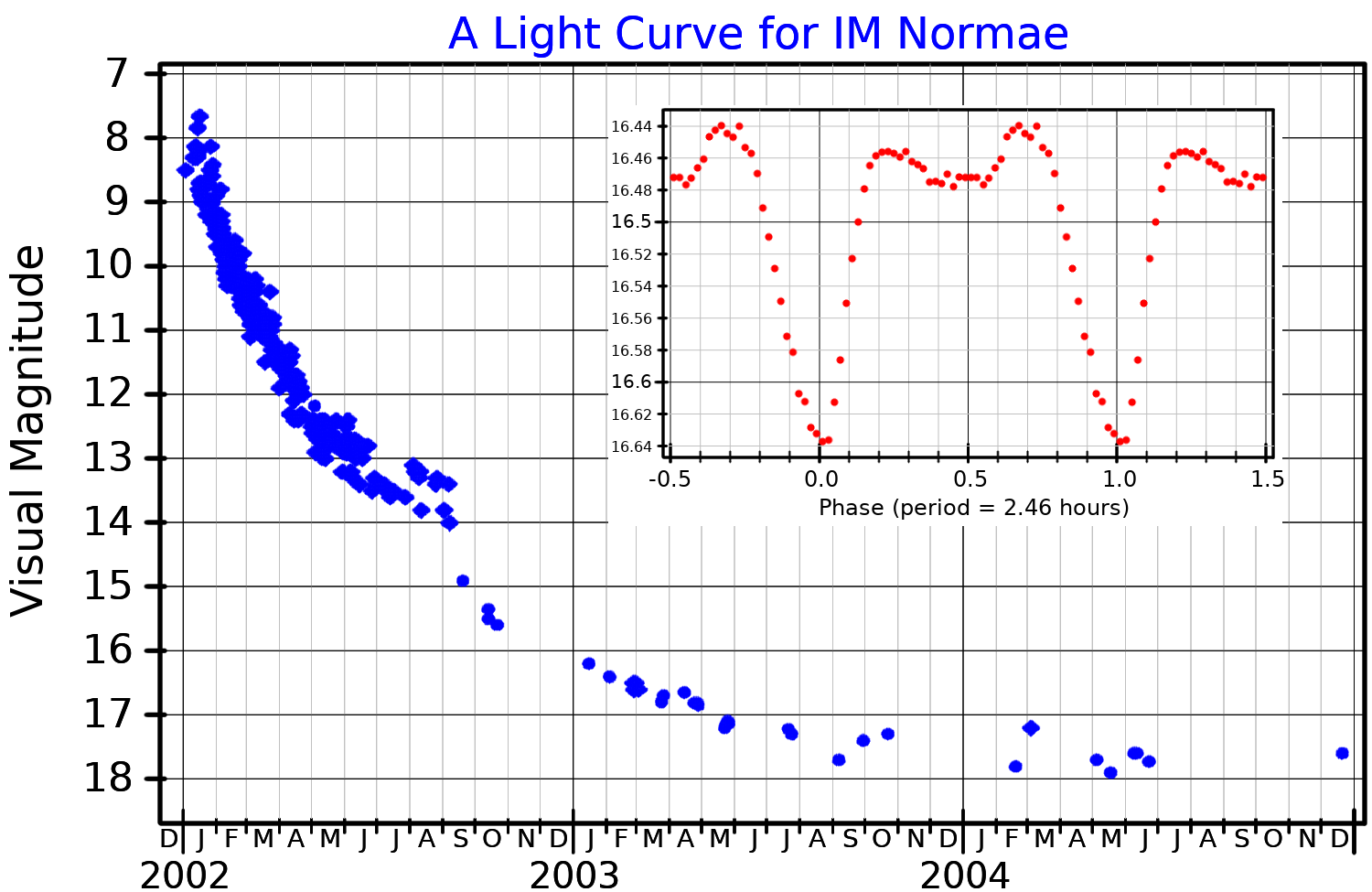
- A visual band light curve for IM Normae. The main plot shows the decline from the 2002 eruption, and the inset plot shows the periodic variation seen when the nova is in its quiescent state. Adapted from Schaefer (2010)

Observation data Epoch J2000 Equinox J2000
- Constellation: Norma
- Right ascension: 15^{h} 39^{m} 26.465^{s}
- Declination: −52° 19′ 17.99″

Characteristics
- Spectral type: white dwarf + ?
- Variable type: eclipsing recurrent nova (NR+E)

Astrometry
Parallax (π)	0.9946±0.4149 mas
Distance	approx. 3,000 ly (approx. 1,000 pc)
Absolute magnitude (M_{V})	−4.4

Details

White dwarf
Mass	1.21 M_{☉}

Other designations
- AAVSO 1532-52, Nova Normae 1920

Database references
SIMBAD	data

IM Normae (IM Nor) is a recurrent nova in the constellation Norma, one of only ten known in the Milky Way. It has been observed to erupt in 1920 and 2002, reaching magnitude 8.5 from a baseline of 18.3. It was poorly monitored after the first eruption, so it is possible that it erupted in between these dates.

The 1920 outburst was discovered by Ida Elizabeth Woods when she examined a Harvard Observatory photographic plate taken by the Bruce telescope in Arequipa, Peru, on July 7th of that year.

At minimum, IM Normae shows brightness variations of about 0.3 magnitudes. These consist of 0.2 magnitude dips that are interpreted as partial eclipses of the accretion disk, and continuous variations caused by one side of the secondary star being heated by the white dwarf and therefore brighter than the other face. The orbital period is 2.462 hours.
