= Iota1 Normae =

Star in the constellation Norma

ι^{1} Normae
- Location of ι^{1} Normae (circled in red)

Observation data Epoch J2000 Equinox ICRS
- Constellation: Norma
- ι^{1} Nor AB
- Right ascension: 16^{h} 03^{m} 32.08942^{s}
- Declination: −57° 46′ 30.2641″
- Apparent magnitude (V): 5.14 + 5.70
- ι^{1} Nor C
- Right ascension: 16^{h} 03^{m} 30.86534^{s}
- Declination: −57° 46′ 35.2404″
- Apparent magnitude (V): 8.02 (8.75 + 8.75)

Characteristics

ι^{1} Nor AB
- Spectral type: A4 V + A6 V

ι^{1} Nor C
- Spectral type: G8V + K4V
- Variable type: suspected RS CVn

Astrometry

ι^{1} Nor AB
Radial velocity (R_{v})	−14.4±3.7 km/s
Proper motion (μ)	RA: −120.01 mas/yr Dec.: −82.09 mas/yr
Parallax (π)	24.67 mas
Distance	132.2 ly (40.54 pc)

ι^{1} Nor C
Radial velocity (R_{v})	−10.0±0.7 km/s
Proper motion (μ)	RA: −117.271 mas/yr Dec.: −85.238 mas/yr
Parallax (π)	24.3136±0.0220 mas
Distance	134.1 ± 0.1 ly (41.13 ± 0.04 pc)

Orbit
Primary	ι^{1} Nor A
Name	ι^{1} Nor B
Period (P)	26.84±0.09 yr
Semi-major axis (a)	0.328±0.006″
Eccentricity (e)	0.515±0.012
Inclination (i)	168.7±9.9°
Longitude of the node (Ω)	42.0±43.2°
Periastron epoch (T)	1990.87±0.21
Argument of periastron (ω) (secondary)	320.0±44.1°

Orbit
Primary	ι^{1} Nor Ca
Name	ι^{1} Nor Cb
Period (P)	0.82346(1) days
Semi-major axis (a)	0.512 mas
Eccentricity (e)	0 (assumed)
Inclination (i)	~45°
Argument of periastron (ω) (secondary)	0 (assumed)°
Semi-amplitude (K_{1}) (primary)	107.0±1.2 km/s
Semi-amplitude (K_{2}) (secondary)	124.7±2.1 km/s

Details

ι^{1} Nor A
Mass	1.75 M_{☉}

ι^{1} Nor B
Mass	1.54 M_{☉}

ι^{1} Nor Ca
Mass	0.88 M_{☉}

ι^{1} Nor Cb
Mass	0.88 M_{☉}

Other designations
- ι^{1} Nor, CPD−57°7500, HR 5961, WDS J16035-5747
- AB: HD 143474, HIP 78662, SAO 243279
- C: SAO 243278

Database references
SIMBAD	data
- C

Iota^{1} Normae (ι^{1} Normae) is a quadruple star system in the southern constellation of Norma. With a combined apparent visual magnitude of 4.63, it is faintly visible to the naked eye. Stellar parallax measurements give distances varying between 132.2 and 134.1 light-years. At that distance, the visual magnitude of these stars is diminished by an extinction of 0.062 magnitudes due to interstellar dust.

The inner pair orbit each other with a period of 26.8 years, a semimajor axis of 0.33 arc seconds, and an eccentricity of 0.515. Both stars are A-type main sequence stars. The brighter of the pair, magnitude 5.14 component A, has a spectral class of A4 V, while its magnitude 5.70 companion, component B, is of class A6 V. The two are 1.94 and 1.65 times as massive as the Sun, respectively. The tertiary member, component C, lies at an angular separation of 11.0 arc seconds from the other members. It has an apparent magnitude of 8.02 and is itself a close binary, comprising two stars with an orbital period around 0.82 days, each with an apparent magnitude of 8.75.
