= Eta Normae =

G-type star in the constellation Norma

- Location of η Normae (circled in red)

Observation data Epoch J2000 Equinox ICRS
- Constellation: Norma
- Right ascension: 16^{h} 03^{m} 12.89783^{s}
- Declination: −49° 13′ 46.9151″
- Apparent magnitude (V): 4.65

Characteristics
- Evolutionary stage: red clump
- Spectral type: G8III
- U−B color index: +0.64
- B−V color index: +0.92

Astrometry
Radial velocity (R_{v})	−0.3±2.8 km/s
Proper motion (μ)	RA: 42.05 mas/yr Dec.: 9.14 mas/yr
Parallax (π)	14.86±0.25 mas
Distance	219 ± 4 ly (67 ± 1 pc)
Absolute magnitude (M_{V})	0.524

Details
Mass	2.78 M_{☉}
Radius	11.07+0.23 −0.09 R_{☉}
Luminosity	71.9±3.1 L_{☉}
Surface gravity (log g)	2.84 cgs
Temperature	5052+16 −51 K
Metallicity [Fe/H]	−0.05 dex

Other designations
- η Nor, CD−48°10512, HD 143546, HIP 78639, HR 5962, SAO 226466

Database references
SIMBAD	data

Eta Normae, Latinized from η Normae, is a single star in the southern constellation of Norma. It is visible to the naked eye as a faint, yellow-hued star with an apparent visual magnitude of 4.65. The distance to this star is about 219 light years, based on parallax. The Gamma Normids radiate from a position near this star.

This is an aging giant star with a stellar classification of G8III, having exhausted the supply of hydrogen at its core then swollen and cooled off the main sequence. At present it has a diameter of 11 times that of the Sun. It is a red clump giant, meaning it is on the horizontal branch and is generating energy through core helium fusion. The star has 2.78 times the mass of the Sun and is radiating 72 times the Sun's luminosity from its enlarged photosphere at an effective temperature of 5,052 K. It is a source for X-ray emission.
