= Kappa Normae =

Star in the constellation Norma

- Location of κ Normae (circled)

Observation data Epoch J2000 Equinox ICRS
- Constellation: Norma
- Right ascension: 16^{h} 13^{m} 28.72874^{s}
- Declination: −54° 37′ 49.6860″
- Apparent magnitude (V): 4.94

Characteristics
- Spectral type: G8 III
- U−B color index: +0.81
- B−V color index: +1.04

Astrometry
Radial velocity (R_{v})	−13.5±0.8 km/s
Proper motion (μ)	RA: −3.845 mas/yr Dec.: −22.366 mas/yr
Parallax (π)	7.4386±0.2471 mas
Distance	440 ± 10 ly (134 ± 4 pc)
Absolute magnitude (M_{V})	−0.64

Details
Mass	3.6 M_{☉}
Radius	18.4 R_{☉}
Luminosity	190 L_{☉}
Surface gravity (log g)	2.34 cgs
Temperature	4,996 K
Metallicity [Fe/H]	−0.05 dex
Rotational velocity (v sin i)	8.3 km/s

Other designations
- κ Nor, CD−54°6604, FK5 600, HD 145397, HIP 79509, HR 6024, SAO 243454, WDS J16135-5438A

Database references
SIMBAD	data

Kappa Normae, Latinized from κ Normae, is a solitary, yellow hued star in the southern constellation of Norma. Its apparent magnitude is 4.94, which is bright enough to be faintly visible to the naked eye. Based upon an annual parallax shift of 7.44 mas as seen from Earth, the system is located about 440 light years from the Sun. It is drifting closer with a radial velocity of 13.5 km/s.

This is an evolved giant star with a stellar classification of G8III that has swollen and cooled off the main sequence. At present it has 18 times the radius of the Sun. It shines with a luminosity approximately 190 times that of the Sun and has an effective temperature of 4,996 K.
