= Gamma2 Normae =

Evolved K-type star in the constellation Norma

Gamma^{2} Normae
- Location of γ^{2} Normae (circled in red)

Observation data Epoch J2000 Equinox ICRS
- Constellation: Norma
- Right ascension: 16^{h} 19^{m} 50.42231^{s}
- Declination: −50° 09′ 19.8216″
- Apparent magnitude (V): 4.02

Characteristics
- Evolutionary stage: Red clump
- Spectral type: K0III
- U−B color index: +1.16
- B−V color index: +1.08

Astrometry
Radial velocity (R_{v})	−29.15±0.42 km/s
Proper motion (μ)	RA: −159.666 mas/yr Dec.: −51.94 mas/yr
Parallax (π)	23.5698±0.1272 mas
Distance	138.4 ± 0.7 ly (42.4 ± 0.2 pc)
Absolute magnitude (M_{V})	0.86±0.04

Details
Mass	2.06±0.23 M_{☉}
Radius	10.35±0.35 R_{☉}
Luminosity	49.7±2.2 L_{☉}
Surface gravity (log g)	2.750±0.171 cgs
Temperature	4,763±63 K
Metallicity [Fe/H]	+0.250±0.036 dex
Rotational velocity (v sin i)	2.3 km/s
Age	1.44 Gyr

Other designations
- γ^{2} Nor, CD−49°10536, GC 12216, GJ 9554, HD 146686, HIP 80000, HR 6072, SAO 243643

Database references
SIMBAD	data
ARICNS	data

Gamma^{2} Normae, Latinized from γ^{2} Nor, is the brightest star in the southern constellation of Norma. Its apparent magnitude is 4.02 – making it a faint star but visible to the naked eye. Based upon an annual parallax shift of 23.57 mas as seen from Earth, this star is located roughly 138 light years away. It is moving closer to the Sun with a radial velocity of −29 km/s.

This is an evolved, orange-hued giant of spectral type K0 III. A red clump star, it has started the fusion of helium at its core and is now in the evolutionary stage known as the horizontal branch. The star is around 2.16 times as massive as the Sun and has grown to a diameter 10.35 times that of the Sun. The star is radiating 50 times the Sun's luminosity from its enlarged photosphere at an effective temperature of 4,763 K.

Gamma^{2} Normae is a double star, with a magnitude 10 companion 45″ away. The pair has been previously identified as a binary star system, but parallax measurements from the Gaia spacecraft data showed the companion star to be much more distant. A white dwarf located 24.38" away has similar distance and proper motion with Gamma^{2} Normae.
