= Norma (constellation) =

Constellation in the southern celestial hemisphere

- Constellation
- List of stars in Norma
- Abbreviation: Nor
- Genitive: Normae
- Pronunciation: /ˈnɔːrmə/, genitive /ˈnɔːrmiː/
- Symbolism: the carpenter's square
- Right ascension: 15^{h} 12^{m} 13.6119^{s}–16^{h} 36^{m} 08.3235^{s}
- Declination: −42.27°–−60.44°
- Quadrant: SQ3
- Area: 165 sq. deg. (74th)
- Main stars: 4
- Bayer/Flamsteed stars: 13
- Stars brighter than 3.00^{m}: 0
- Stars within 10.00 pc (32.62 ly): 1
- Brightest star: γ^{2} Nor (4.01^{m})
- Nearest star: 2MASS J15404342−5101357
- Messier objects: 0
- Meteor showers: Gamma Normids
- Bordering constellations: Ara; Lupus; Circinus; Triangulum Australe; Scorpius
- Visible at latitudes between +30° and −90°. Best visible at 21:00 (9 p.m.) during the month of June. ]

Norma is a small constellation in the Southern Celestial Hemisphere between Ara and Lupus, one of twelve drawn up in the 18th century by French astronomer Nicolas-Louis de Lacaille and one of several depicting scientific instruments. Its name is Latin for normal, referring to a right angle, and is variously considered to represent a rule, a carpenter's square, a set square or a level. It remains one of the 88 modern constellations.

Four of Norma's brighter stars—Gamma, Delta, Epsilon and Eta—make up a square in the field of faint stars. Gamma^{2} Normae is the brightest star with an apparent magnitude of 4.0. Mu Normae is one of the most luminous stars known, with a luminosity between a quarter million and one million times that of the Sun. Four star systems are known to harbour planets. The Milky Way, particularly the Norma Arm of the galaxy, passes through Norma, and the constellation contains eight open clusters visible to observers with binoculars. The constellation also hosts Abell 3627, also called the Norma Cluster, one of the most massive galaxy clusters known.

== History ==
Norma was introduced in 1751–52 by Nicolas-Louis de Lacaille with the French name l’Équerre et la Règle, "the Square and Rule", after he had observed and catalogued 10,000 southern stars during a two-year stay at the Cape of Good Hope. He devised 14 new constellations in uncharted regions of the Southern Celestial Hemisphere not visible from Europe. All but one honoured instruments that symbolised the Age of Enlightenment. (Note: The exception is Mensa, named for the Table Mountain.) Lacaille portrayed the constellations of Norma, Circinus and Triangulum Australe, respectively, as a set square and ruler, a compass, and a surveyor's level in a set of draughtsman instruments, in his 1756 map of the southern stars. The level was dangling from the apex of a triangle, leading some astronomers to conclude he was renaming l’Équerre et la Règle to "le Niveau", "the level". In any case, the constellation's name had been shortened and Latinised by Lacaille to Norma by 1763.

== Characteristics ==
Norma is bordered by Scorpius to the north, Lupus to the northwest, Circinus to the west, Triangulum Australe to the south and Ara to the east. Covering 165.3 square degrees and 0.401% of the night sky, it ranks 74th of the 88 constellations in size. The three-letter abbreviation for the constellation, as adopted by the International Astronomical Union in 1922, is "Nor". The official constellation boundaries, as set by Belgian astronomer Eugène Delporte in 1930, are defined by a polygon of ten segments. In the equatorial coordinate system, the right ascension coordinates of these borders lie between 15^{h} 12^{m} 13.6119^{s} and 16^{h} 36^{m} 08.3235^{s}, while the declination coordinates are between −42.27° and −60.44°. The whole constellation is visible to observers south of latitude 29°N. (Note: While parts of the constellation technically rise above the horizon to observers between 29°N and 48°N, stars within a few degrees of the horizon are to all intents and purposes unobservable.)

== Features ==
=== Stars ===
Lacaille charted and designated ten stars with the Bayer designations Alpha through to Mu in 1756. However, his Alpha Normae was transferred into Scorpius and left unnamed by Francis Baily, before being named N Scorpii by Benjamin Apthorp Gould, who felt its brightness warranted recognition. Though Beta Normae was depicted on his star chart, it was inadvertently left out of Lacaille's 1763 catalogue, was likewise transferred to Scorpius by Baily and named H Scorpii by Gould. Norma's brightest star, Gamma^{2} Normae, is only of magnitude 4.0. Overall, there are 44 stars within the constellation's borders brighter than or equal to apparent magnitude 6.5. (Note: Objects of magnitude 6.5 are among the faintest visible to the unaided eye in suburban-rural transition night skies.)

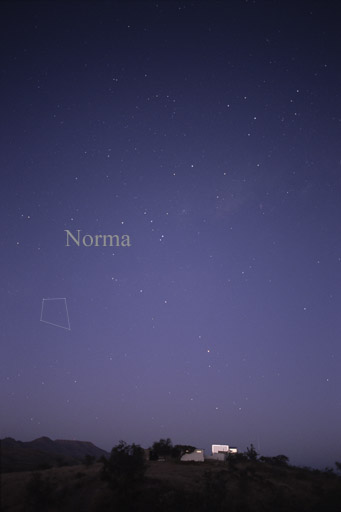
The constellation Norma as it can be seen by the naked eye

The four main stars—Gamma, Delta, Epsilon and Eta—make up a square in this region of faint stars. Gamma^{1} and Gamma^{2} Normae are an optical double, and not a true binary star system. Located 129 ± 1 light-years away from Earth, Gamma^{2} Normae is a yellow giant of spectral type G8III around 2 to 2.5 times as massive as the Sun. It has swollen to a diameter 10 times that of the Sun and shines with 45 times the Sun's luminosity. It also is half of a close optical double, with a magnitude 10 companion star related by line of sight only. Gamma^{1} Normae is a yellow-white supergiant, located much further away at around 1500 light-years from Earth. Epsilon Normae is a spectroscopic binary, with two blue-white main sequence stars of almost equal mass and spectral type (B3V) orbiting each other every 3.26 days. There is a third star separated by 22 arcseconds, which has a magnitude of 7.5 and is likely a smaller B-type main sequence star of spectral type B9V. The system is 530 ± 20 light-years distant from Earth, Eta Normae is a yellow giant of spectral type G8III with an apparent magnitude of 4.65. It shines with a luminosity approximately 66 times that of the Sun.

Iota^{1} Normae is a multiple star system. The AB (mag 5.2 and 5.76) pair orbit each other with a period of 26.9 years; they are 2.77 and 2.71 times as massive as the Sun respectively. The pair are 128 ± 6 light-years distant from Earth. A third component is a yellow main sequence star of spectral type G8V with an apparent magnitude of 8.02.

Mu Normae is a remote blue supergiant of spectral type O9.7Iab, one of the most luminous stars known, but is partially obscured by distance and cosmic dust. Uncertainties regarding its distance leave open the possibility that Mu Normae could be between 250,000 and one million times as luminous and up to 60 times as massive as the Sun, though it is more likely to have around 500,000 times the Sun's luminosity and 40 times its mass. It is suspected of being an Alpha Cygni variable, with a magnitude range of 4.87–4.98. QU Normae is another hot blue-white star that is a variable, ranging from magnitude 5.27 to 5.41 over 4.8 days. Lying near Eta Normae is R Normae, a Mira variable. Its visual magnitude range is 6.5–13.9 and its average period is 507.5 days. Located halfway between Eta Normae and Gamma Circini is T Normae, another Mira variable. It ranges from magnitude 6.2 to 13.6, with a period of 244 days. S Normae is a well-known Cepheid variable with a magnitude range of 6.12–6.77 and a period of 9.75411 days. It is located at the centre of the open cluster NGC 6087. It is a yellow-white supergiant of spectral type F8-G0Ib that is 6.3 times as massive as the Sun. A binary, it has a 2.4 solar mass (M_{☉}) companion that is a blue-white main sequence star of spectral type B9.5V. A binary system composed of two wolf-rayet stars, colloquially called Apep, has been identified as a possible progenitor of a long gamma-ray burst. Located around 8000 light-years distant, it would be the first such in the Milky Way.

IM Normae is one of only ten recurrent novae known in the Milky Way. It has erupted in 1920 and 2002, reaching magnitude 8.5 from a baseline of 18.3. It was poorly monitored after the first eruption, so it is possible that it erupted in between. Norma hosts two faint R Coronae Borealis variable stars of magnitude 10—RT Normae and RZ Normae—rare degenerate stars thought to have formed from the merger of two white dwarfs that fade by several magnitudes periodically as they eject large amounts of carbon dust. A faint object of magnitude 16, QV Normae is a high mass X-ray binary star system 15,000–20,000 light-years distant from Earth. It is composed of a neutron star orbiting a blue-white supergiant approximately 20 times as massive as the Sun. The stellar wind from the more massive star is drawn to the magnetic poles of the neutron star, forming an accretion column and producing X-rays. Located 19,000 light-years away, QX Normae is an active low mass X ray binary composed of a neutron star and its companion star that is smaller and cooler than the Sun. The neutron star is 1.74 ± 0.14 times as massive as the Sun, yet its radius is a mere 9.3 ± 1.0 km. 1E161348-5055 is a neutron star found in the centre of RCW103 supernova remnant. A periodic X-ray source with a period of 6.67 hours, it is approximately 2000 years old and 10,000 light-years away from Earth. It is unusual in that it is spinning much too slowly for its young age, behaving instead like a multi-million-year-old star. SGR J1550-5418 is a soft gamma repeater (SGR)—a magnetar that is emitting gamma ray flares, located some 30,000 light-years distant from Earth. The rotation period, of approximately 2.07 seconds, is the fastest yet observed for a magnetar. XTE J1550-564 is another X-ray binary, this time composed of a large black hole around 10 times as massive as the Sun and a cool orange donor star. The black hole is a microquasar, firing off jets of material most likely from its accretion disk.

=== Exoplanets ===
Four star systems are known to harbour planets. HD 330075 is a sunlike star around 164 light-years distant that is orbited by a hot Jupiter every 3.4 days. Announced in 2004, it was the first planet discovered by the HARPS spectrograph. HD 148156 is a star 168 ± 7 light-years distant. Slightly larger and hotter than the Sun, it was found to have a roughly Jupiter-size planet with an orbital period of 2.8 years. HD 143361 is a binary star system composed of a sunlike star and a faint red dwarf separated by 30.9 AU. A planet roughly triple the mass of Jupiter orbits the brighter star every 1057± 20 days. HD 142415 is approximately 113 light-years distant and has a Jupiter-sized planet with an orbital period of around 386 days.

=== Deep-sky objects ===
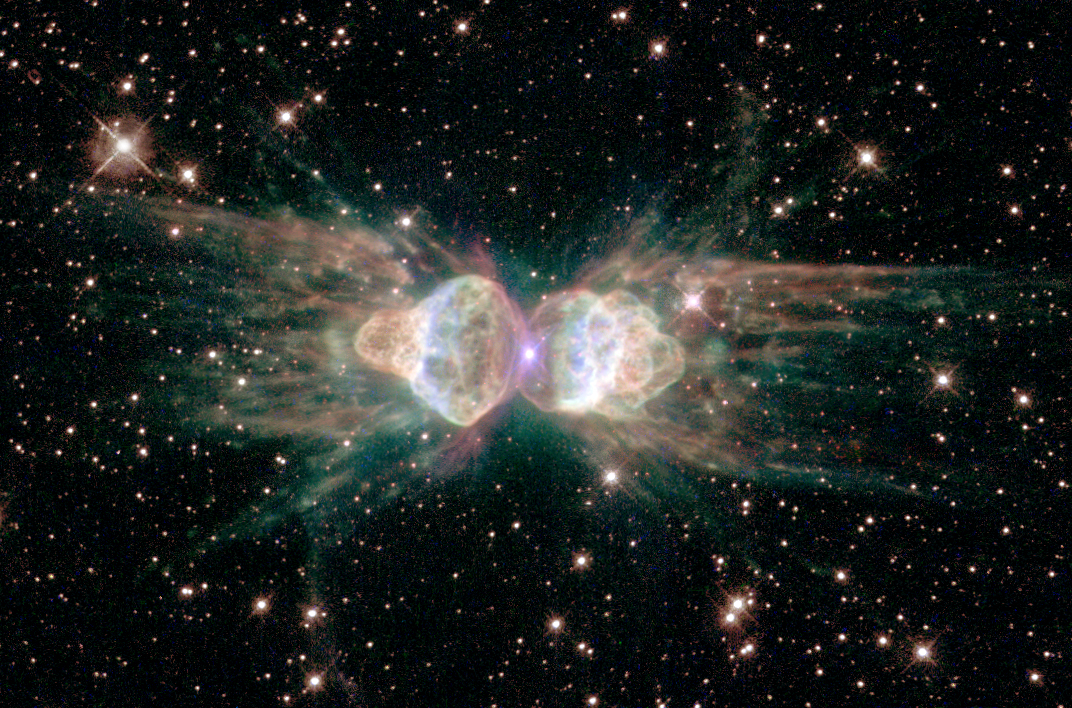
The Ant Nebula, Mz 3, viewed with the Hubble Space Telescope

Due to its location on the Milky Way, this constellation contains many deep-sky objects such as star clusters, including eight open clusters visible through binoculars. NGC 6087 is the brightest of the open clusters in Norma with a magnitude of 5.4. It lies in the southeastern corner of the constellation between Alpha Centauri and Zeta Arae. Thought to be around 100 million years old, it is about 3300 light-years away and is around 14 light-years in diameter. Its brightest member is S Normae. A rich background star field makes it less distinct, though around 36 member stars are visible though a 10 cm telescope at 150x magnification. Located 0.4° north of Kappa Normae is NGC 6067, which has an integrated magnitude of 5.6 though it is indistinct as it lies in a rich star field. It is thought to be around 102 million years old, and contain 891 solar masses. Two Cepheid variables—QZ Normae and V340 Normae—have been identified as members of the cluster. Fainter open clusters include NGC 6134 with a combined magnitude of 7.2 and located 4000 light-years away from Earth, the spread-out NGC 6167 of magnitude 6.7, NGC 6115 near Gamma Normae, NGC 6031 and NGC 5999.

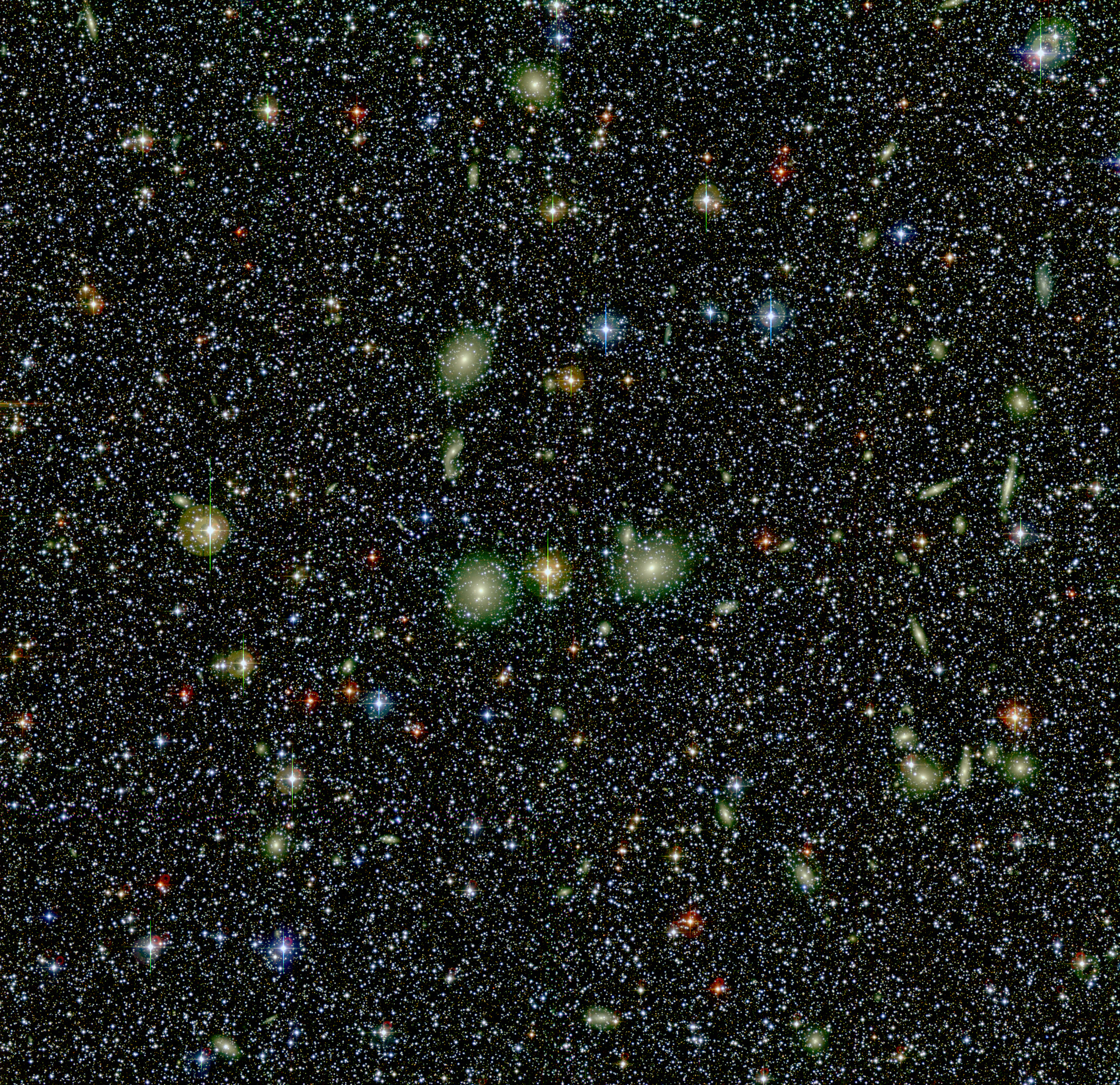
Galaxies of the Norma Cluster (yellow) in a 0.5° x 0.5° field

Located around 4900 light-years distant is Shapley 1 (or PK 329+02.1), a planetary nebula better known as the Fine-Ring Nebula. Appearing ring-shaped, it is thought that it actually is cylindrical and oriented directly at Earth. Around 8700 years old, it lies about five degrees west-northwest of Gamma^{1} Normae. Its integrated magnitude is 13.6 and its mean surface brightness is 13.9. The central star is a white dwarf of magnitude 14.03. Mz 1 is a bipolar planetary nebula, thought to be an hourglass shape tilted at an angle to observers on Earth, some 3500 light-years distant. Mz 3—known as the Ant Nebula as it resembles an ant—has a complex appearance, with at least four outflow jets and two large lobes visible.

Approximately 200 million light-years from Earth with a redshift of 0.016 is Abell 3627; also called the Norma Cluster, it is one of the most massive galaxy clusters known to exist, at ten times the average cluster mass. Abell 3627 is thus theorized to be the Great Attractor, a massive object that is pulling the Local Group, the Virgo Supercluster, and the Hydra–Centaurus Supercluster towards its location at 600–1000 kilometres per second.

=== Meteor showers ===
The relatively weak meteor shower Gamma Normids (GNO), which is typically active from March 7 to 23, peaking on March 15, has its radiant near Gamma^{2} Normae.

== Galactic Arm ==
Diagram of the Milky Way's spiral arms

The Norma Arm is a minor galactic arm named after Norma for lying in its background.
