= List of astronomical catalogues by Stephen James O'Meara =

This article contains a list of astronomical catalogues compiled by American astronomer Stephen James O'Meara. The catalogues were published by Cambridge University Press in three separate volumes from 2007 to 2013.

== Overview ==
Stephen James O'Meara's Deep-Sky Companions series of observing guides for deep-sky objects, published by Cambridge University Press, has five volumes. The volumes are The Messier Objects (1998; revised 2014), The Caldwell Objects (2002), Hidden Treasures (2007), The Secret Deep (2011), and Southern Gems (2013).

The last three Deep-Sky Companions books contain the following original astronomical catalogues:

- Hidden Treasures (HT) main list (109 entries). 16 HT entries are duplicated in the Southern Gems (SG) main list.
  - Hidden Treasures (AHT) additional list (20 entries). 19 AHT entries are duplicated in O'Meara's other original Deep-Sky Companions lists, mostly in the The Secret Deep (SD) and Southern Gems (SG) main lists. Only AHT 9 (IC 4406) is a unique entry.
- The Secret Deep (SD) main list (109 entries)
  - The Secret Deep (ASD) additional list (21 entries). 2 ASD entries have duplicates in O'Meara's other original Deep-Sky Companions lists: ASD 18 (NGC 5824) is equivalent to SG 71; ASD 19 (IC 4603) is equivalent to AHT 14.
- Southern Gems (SG) (120 entries). A selection of James Dunlop's catalogue, based on his manuscripts.
  - Southern Gems (ASG) additional list (42 entries). No ASG entries are duplicated in O'Meara's other original Deep-Sky Companions lists.

Many, but not all, of these objects overlap with Herschel 400 Catalogue objects. Herschel 400 objects all have NGC and IC designations, since the Herschel 400 Catalogue is a subset of John Herschel's General Catalogue of Nebulae and Clusters (1864). However, many objects in O'Meara's catalogues have no NGC and IC designations, since they were not catalogued by Herschel; rather, some of O'Meara's catalogue objects can be found in the Melotte catalogue, Collinder catalogue, or other astronomical catalogues. The objects in O'Meara's catalogues are all viewable with high-quality 5-inch refracting telescopes under ideal dark-sky conditions.

== Star charts ==
Chart of Hidden Treasures (red) and Secret Deep (blue) objects (using O'Meara's designations)

Chart of Hidden Treasures (red) and Secret Deep (blue) objects (using NGC numbers as the default, as well as other standard designations)

Chart combining Messier objects (black), Caldwell objects (orange), and Stephen James O'Meara's Hidden Treasures (red) and Secret Deep (blue) objects (using NGC numbers as the default, as well as other standard designations)

Chart of Southern Gems objects (using O'Meara's designations)

Chart of Southern Gems objects (using NGC numbers as the default, as well as other standard designations)

== Key ==
Open cluster Globular cluster Diffuse nebula Planetary nebula Galaxy Other

== Hidden Treasures catalogue ==
Hidden Treasures (2007) has an original list of 109 deep-sky objects intended to complement the Messier and Caldwell lists; none of the Hidden Treasures objects are duplicated in the Messier and Caldwell catalogues. Combined with the supplementary list of 20 additional objects, there are 129 objects total. Hidden Treasures objects are all visible through 4-inch telescopes under dark skies, since O'Meara used a Tele Vue 4-inch f/5 Genesis refractor telescope to observe all of the Hidden Treasures objects. Most are visible from the Northern Hemisphere, with a minority visible only from the Southern Hemisphere.

Hidden Treasures (HT) objects
HT no.	Designation	Common name(s)	Object type	Constellation	Apparent dimensions	Right ascension (J2000)	Declination (J2000)
HT 1	NGC 189		Open cluster	Cassiopeia	5′	00^{h} 39.6^{m}	+61° 06′
HT 2	NGC 225	Sailboat Cluster; Broken Heart Cluster	Open cluster	Cassiopeia	15′	00^{h} 43.6^{m}	+61° 46′
HT 3	NGC 281	Pacman Nebula; Lafitte's Grand Isle Nebula	Bright nebula	Cassiopeia	35′ × 30′	00^{h} 52.8^{m}	+56° 37′
HT 4	NGC 288		Globular cluster	Sculptor	13′	00^{h} 52.8^{m}	−26° 35′
HT 5	NGC 404	Mirach's Ghost; Lost Pearl Galaxy; Comet Komorowski	Galaxy	Andromeda	6.6′ × 6.6′	01^{h} 09.4^{m}	+35° 43′
HT 6	NGC 584	Little Spindle Galaxy	Galaxy	Cetus	3.8′ × 2.4′	01^{h} 31.3^{m}	−06° 52′
HT 7	NGC 659	Yin-Yang Cluster	Open cluster	Cassiopeia	6′	01^{h} 44.4^{m}	+60° 40′
HT 8	NGC 772	Fiddlehead Galaxy	Galaxy	Aries	7.1′ × 4.7′	01^{h} 59.3^{m}	+19° 00′
HT 9	NGC 908		Galaxy	Cetus	6.1′ × 2.7′	02^{h} 23.1^{m}	−21° 14′
HT 10	NGC 1023	Perseus Lenticular	Galaxy	Perseus	7.5′ × 3.0′	02^{h} 40.4^{m}	+39° 04′
HT 11	NGC 1232	Eye of God	Galaxy	Eridanus	7.2′ × 5.7′	03^{h} 09.8^{m}	−20° 35′
HT 12	NGC 1291	Snow Collar Galaxy	Galaxy	Eridanus	11.1′ × 10.1′	03^{h} 17.3^{m}	−41° 06′
HT 13	NGC 1316	Fornax A	Galaxy	Fornax	13.5′ × 9.3′	03^{h} 22.7^{m}	−37° 12′
HT 14	Melotte 20	Alpha Persei Moving Cluster; Little Cloud of Pirates	Open cluster	Perseus	300′	03^{h} 24.3^{m}	+49° 52′
HT 15	NGC 1333	Embryo Nebula; Phantom Tiara Nebula	Bright nebula	Perseus	6′ × 3′	03^{h} 29.3^{m}	+31° 25′
HT 16	NGC 1360	Comet Planetary Nebula	Planetary nebula	Fornax	9′ × 5′	03^{h} 33.2^{m}	−25° 52′
HT 17	NGC 1365		Galaxy	Fornax	11.2′ × 5.9′	03^{h} 33.6^{m}	−36° 08′
HT 18	NGC 1399		Galaxy	Fornax	8.1′ × 7.6′	03^{h} 38.5^{m}	−35° 27′
HT 19	NGC 1398		Galaxy	Fornax	7.6′ × 5.3′	03^{h} 38.9^{m}	−26° 20′
HT 20	NGC 1404		Galaxy	Fornax	4.8′ × 3.9′	03^{h} 38.9^{m}	−35° 36′
HT 21	Kemble 1	Kemble's Cascade; Kidd's Creek	Asterism	Camelopardalis	180′	03^{h} 57.4^{m}	+63° 04′
HT 22	NGC 1501	Oyster Nebula; Blue Oyster Nebula	Planetary nebula	Camelopardalis	56′ × 48′	04^{h} 07.0^{m}	+60° 55′
HT 23	NGC 1502	Jolly Roger Cluster	Open cluster	Camelopardalis	20′	04^{h} 07.8^{m}	+62° 20′
HT 24	NGC 1535	Cleopatra's Eye; Celestial Jellyfish Nebula; Ghost of Neptune Nebula	Planetary nebula	Eridanus	48′ × 42′	04^{h} 14.3^{m}	−12° 44′
HT 25	NGC 1528	M&M Double Cluster	Open cluster	Perseus	18′	04^{h} 15.3^{m}	+51° 13′
HT 26	NGC 1545	M&M Double Cluster; Running Man Cluster; Magic Pentagram Cluster	Open cluster	Perseus	12′	04^{h} 20.9^{m}	+50° 15′
HT 27	NGC 1647	Pirate Moon Cluster	Open cluster	Taurus	40′	04^{h} 45.7^{m}	+19° 07′
HT 28	IC 418	Spirograph Nebula; Raspberry Nebula; Colored Contacts Nebula	Planetary nebula	Lepus	14′ × 11′	05^{h} 27.5^{m}	−12° 42′
HT 29	Collinder 69	Lambda Orionis Cluster; Aunt Margaret's Mirror	Open cluster	Orion	70′	05^{h} 35.0^{m}	+09° 56′
HT 30	NGC 1981	Coal Car Cluster	Open cluster	Orion	28′	05^{h} 35.2^{m}	−04° 26′
HT 31	Collinder 72	Lost Jewel of Orion	Open cluster	Orion	15′	05^{h} 35.4^{m}	−05° 55′
HT 32	NGC 1977	Mermaid's Purse Nebula; Running Man Nebula	Bright nebula	Orion	20′ × 10′	05^{h} 35.5^{m}	−04° 52′
HT 33	NGC 1999	13th Pearl Nebula; Rubber Stamp Nebula	Bright nebula	Orion	2′ × 2′	05^{h} 36.5^{m}	−06° 42′
HT 34	NGC 2024	Lips Nebula; Flame Nebula; Burning Bush Nebula; Tank Tracks Nebula; Ghost of Alnitak; One Piece Nebula	Bright nebula	Orion	30′ × 30′	05^{h} 41.9^{m}	−01° 51′
HT 35	NGC 2163 (Cederblad 62)		Bright nebula	Orion	3′ × 2′	06^{h} 07.8^{m}	+18° 39′
HT 36	NGC 2169	Shopping Cart Cluster; Little Pleiades; 37 Cluster	Open cluster	Orion	6′	06^{h} 08.4^{m}	+13° 58′
HT 37	NGC 2175		Bright nebula	Orion	40′ × 30′	06^{h} 09.7^{m}	+20° 30′
HT 38	NGC 2264	Christmas Tree Cluster	Open cluster	Monoceros	40′	06^{h} 41.0^{m}	+09° 54′
HT 39	NGC 2301	Hagrid's Dragon	Open cluster	Monoceros	15′	06^{h} 51.8^{m}	+00° 28′
HT 40	NGC 2353	Avery's Island Cluster	Open cluster	Monoceros	18′	07^{h} 14.5^{m}	−10° 16′
HT 41	NGC 2440	Albino Butterfly Nebula; Kiss Nebula; Little Lips Nebula	Planetary nebula	Puppis	74′ × 42′	07^{h} 41.9^{m}	−18° 12′
HT 42	NGC 2451	Stinging Scorpion	Asterism	Puppis	50′	07^{h} 45.4^{m}	−37° 57′
HT 43	NGC 2467		Bright nebula	Puppis	16′ × 12′	07^{h} 52.5^{m}	−26° 24′
HT 44	NGC 2547	Golden Earring Cluster; St. Peter's Cross; Malus Cluster	Open cluster	Vela	25′	08^{h} 10.2^{m}	−49° 13′
HT 45	NGC 2539	"The Dish" Cluster	Open cluster	Puppis	15′	08^{h} 10.6^{m}	−12° 49′
HT 46	NGC 2546	Heart & Dagger Cluster; "Wounded Heart" Cluster	Open cluster	Puppis	70′	08^{h} 12.4^{m}	−37° 37′
HT 47	NGC 2683	UFO Galaxy	Galaxy	Lynx	9.1′ × 2.7′	08^{h} 52.7^{m}	+33° 25′
HT 48	NGC 2655		Galaxy	Camelopardalis	5.9′ × 5.3′	08^{h} 55.6^{m}	+78° 13′
HT 49	NGC 2841	Tiger's Eye Galaxy	Galaxy	Ursa Major	6.6′ × 3.4′	09^{h} 22.0^{m}	+50° 59′
HT 50	IC 2488	Strings of Pearls Cluster; Hoopskirt Cluster	Open cluster	Vela	18′	09^{h} 27.4^{m}	−56° 57′
HT 51	NGC 2903 / NGC 2905		Galaxy	Leo	11.6′ × 5.7′	09^{h} 32.2^{m}	+21° 30′
HT 52	NGC 3184	Little Pinwheel Galaxy	Galaxy	Ursa Major	7.5′ × 7.0′	10^{h} 18.3^{m}	+41° 25′
HT 53	NGC 3228	Queen's Cache cluster	Open cluster	Vela	5′	10^{h} 21.4^{m}	−51° 43′
HT 54	NGC 3293	Spider Spit Cluster; Little Jewel Box	Open cluster	Carina	5′	10^{h} 35.8^{m}	−58° 13′
HT 55	NGC 3344	Sliced Onion Galaxy	Galaxy	Leo Minor	6.7′ × 6.3′	10^{h} 43.5^{m}	+24° 55′
HT 56	NGC 3521		Galaxy	Leo	11.7′ × 6.5′	11^{h} 05.8^{m}	−00° 02′
HT 57	NGC 3621	Frame Galaxy	Galaxy	Hydra	9.8′ × 4.6′	11^{h} 18.3^{m}	−32° 49′
HT 58	NGC 3628	King Hamlet's Ghost; Vanishing Galaxy	Galaxy	Leo	14.8′ × 3.3′	11^{h} 20.3^{m}	+13° 35′
HT 59	NGC 4214		Galaxy	Canes Venatici	9.6′ × 8.1′	12^{h} 15.6^{m}	+36° 20′
HT 60	NGC 4216	Silver Streak Galaxy; Weaver's Shuttle Galaxy	Galaxy	Virgo	7.9′ × 1.7′	12^{h} 15.9^{m}	+13° 09′
HT 61	NGC 4361		Planetary nebula	Corvus	1.9′ × 1.9′	12^{h} 24.5^{m}	−18° 47′
HT 62	Melotte 111	Coma Berenices Cluster; Berenice's Hair; Ariadne's Hair; Thisbe's Veil; Cobweb Cluster; Black Bart's Hair; Flying Witch Cluster	Open cluster	Coma Berenices	300′	12^{h} 25.1^{m}	+26° 07′
HT 63	NGC 4490	Cocoon Galaxy	Galaxy	Canes Venatici	5.6′ × 2.8′	12^{h} 30.6^{m}	+41° 39′
HT 64	IC 3568	Theoretician's Nebula; Sliced Lime Nebula	Planetary nebula	Camelopardalis	18′ × 18′	12^{h} 33.1^{m}	+82° 34′
HT 65	NGC 4526	Hairy Eyebrow Galaxy	Galaxy	Virgo	7.4′ × 2.7′	12^{h} 34.0^{m}	+07° 42′
HT 66	NGC 4605	Fabergé Egg Galaxy; Frankenstein Galaxy	Galaxy	Ursa Major	5.7′ × 2.5′	12^{h} 40.0^{m}	+61° 36′
HT 67	NGC 4656	"Messier's" Hockey Stick; Hook Galaxy; Hummingbird Galaxy	Galaxy	Canes Venatici	18.8′ × 3.2′	12^{h} 44.0^{m}	+32° 10′
HT 68	NGC 4699	Vinyl LP Galaxy	Galaxy	Virgo	3.1′ × 2.5′	12^{h} 49.0^{m}	−08° 40′
HT 69	NGC 4725		Galaxy	Coma Berenices	10.5′ × 8.1′	12^{h} 50.4^{m}	+25° 30′
HT 70	NGC 5102	Iota's Ghost	Galaxy	Centaurus	8.3′ × 3.5′	13^{h} 22.0^{m}	−36° 38′
HT 71	NGC 5281	Little Scorpion Cluster	Open cluster	Centaurus	8′	13^{h} 46.6^{m}	−62° 55′
HT 72	NGC 5363		Galaxy	Virgo	4.7′ × 3.2′	13^{h} 56.1^{m}	+05° 15′
HT 73	NGC 5662	Gypsy Moth Cluster	Open cluster	Centaurus	30′	14^{h} 35.5^{m}	−56° 40′
HT 74	NGC 5746	Blade & Pearl Galaxy	Galaxy	Virgo	8.1′ × 1.4′	14^{h} 44.9^{m}	+01° 57′
HT 75	NGC 5866	Fool's Gold Galaxy	Galaxy	Draco	7.3′ × 3.5′	15^{h} 06.5^{m}	+55° 46′
HT 76	NGC 5897	Ghost Globular	Globular cluster	Libra	11′	15^{h} 17.4^{m}	−21° 01′
HT 77	NGC 5986		Globular cluster	Lupus	9.6′	15^{h} 46.1^{m}	−37° 47′
HT 78	NGC 6210	Turtle Nebula	Planetary nebula	Hercules	48′ × 8′	16^{h} 44.5^{m}	+23° 48′
HT 79	NGC 6242		Open cluster	Scorpius	9′	16^{h} 55.5^{m}	−39° 28′
HT 80	NGC 6281	Moth Wing Cluster	Open cluster	Scorpius	8′	17^{h} 04.8^{m}	−37° 53′
HT 81	NGC 6369	Little Ghost Nebula; Ghost of Mars Nebula	Planetary nebula	Ophiuchus	58′ × 34′	17^{h} 29.3^{m}	−23° 46′
HT 82	NGC 6400	Phantom Cluster; Long John Silver Cluster	Open cluster	Scorpius	12′	17^{h} 40.2^{m}	−36° 58′
HT 83	IC 4665	Summer Beehive Cluster; Black Swallowtail Butterfly Cluster	Open cluster	Ophiuchus	70′	17^{h} 46.2^{m}	+05° 43′
HT 84	NGC 6445	Box Nebula	Planetary nebula	Sagittarius	3.1′ × 0.9′	17^{h} 49.2^{m}	−20° 01′
HT 85	NGC 6503	Lost-In-Space Galaxy	Galaxy	Draco	5.9′ × 2.2′	17^{h} 49.4^{m}	+70° 09′
HT 86	NGC 6441	Silver Nugget Cluster	Globular cluster	Scorpius	9.6′	17^{h} 50.2^{m}	−37° 03′
HT 87	V2500 Ophiuchi	Barnard's Star; Barnard's Runaway Star; Gilpin; O-bah-bahm-wawa-ge-zhe-go-qua	High-proper-motion star	Ophiuchus	—	17^{h} 57.8^{m}	+04° 40′
HT 88	NGC 6520	Dead Man's Chest; Castaway Cluster	Open cluster	Sagittarius	5′	18^{h} 03.4^{m}	−27° 54′
HT 89	NGC 6544	Starfish Cluster	Globular cluster	Sagittarius	4.6′	18^{h} 07.3^{m}	−25° 00′
HT 90	NGC 6572	Emerald Eye Nebula; Planet Krypton Nebula	Planetary nebula	Ophiuchus	16′ × 13′	18^{h} 12.1^{m}	+06° 51′
HT 91	NGC 6624		Globular cluster	Sagittarius	8.8′	18^{h} 23.7^{m}	−30° 22′
HT 92	NGC 6633	Tweedledum Cluster; Captain Hook Cluster; Wasp-Waist Cluster	Open cluster	Ophiuchus	20′	18^{h} 27.2^{m}	+06° 30′
HT 93	IC 4756	Tweedledee Cluster; Secret Garden Cluster	Open cluster	Serpens	40′	18^{h} 38.9^{m}	+05° 26′
HT 94	NGC 6709	Flying Unicorn Cluster	Open cluster	Aquila	15′	18^{h} 51.5^{m}	+10° 20′
HT 95	NGC 6712		Globular cluster	Scutum	9.8′	18^{h} 53.1^{m}	−08° 42′
HT 96	NGC 6723		Globular cluster	Sagittarius	13.0′	18^{h} 59.5^{m}	−36° 38′
HT 97	Collinder 399	Coathanger; Al-Sufi's "Nebula"; Brocchi's "Cluster"; The Snail	Asterism	Vulpecula	90′	19^{h} 26.2^{m}	+20° 06′
HT 98	NGC 6819	Fox Head Cluster; Octopus Cluster	Open cluster	Cygnus	5′	19^{h} 41.3^{m}	+40° 11′
HT 99	NGC 6818	Little Gem Nebula; Green Mars Nebula	Planetary nebula	Sagittarius	22′ × 15′	19^{h} 44.0^{m}	−14° 09′
HT 100	NGC 6866	Frigate Bird Cluster	Open cluster	Cygnus	15′	20^{h} 03.9^{m}	+44° 09′
HT 101	NGC 6940	Mothra Cluster	Open cluster	Vulpecula	25′	20^{h} 34.5^{m}	+28° 17′
HT 102	—	Northern Coalsack	Dark nebula	Cygnus	480′ × 300′	20^{h} 40.0^{m}	+41° 00′
HT 103	NGC 7008	Coat Button Nebula; Fetus Nebula	Planetary nebula	Cygnus	98′ × 75′	21^{h} 00.5^{m}	+54° 33′
HT 104	NGC 7027	Pink Pillow Nebula; Sugar Pops Nebula; Green Rectangle Nebula	Planetary nebula	Cygnus	18′ × 10′	21^{h} 07.0^{m}	+42° 14′
HT 105	Trumpler 37 (IC 1396 (nebula))	Misty Clover Cluster	Open cluster	Cepheus	90′	21^{h} 39.0^{m}	+57° 30′
HT 106	NGC 7380	Harry Potter and the Golden Snitch	Open cluster	Cepheus	20′	22^{h} 47.3^{m}	+58° 08′
HT 107	O'Meara 1 (Alessi J23407+0757)	Little Ladle	Asterism	Pisces	15′	23^{h} 40.7^{m}	+07° 57′
HT 108	NGC 7789	Herschel's Spiral Cluster; Crab Cluster; Screaming Skull Cluster	Open cluster	Cassiopeia	25′	23^{h} 57.5^{m}	+56° 43′
HT 109	NGC 7793	Bond's Galaxy	Galaxy	Sculptor	9.2′ × 6.4′	23^{h} 57.8^{m}	−32° 35′

=== Additional Hidden Treasures objects ===
Additional Hidden Treasures (AHT) objects
AHT no.	Designation	Common name(s)	Object type	Constellation	Apparent dimensions	Right ascension (J2000)	Declination (J2000)
AHT 1	NGC 134	Giant Squid Galaxy	Galaxy	Sculptor	7.6′ × 1.5′	00^{h} 30.4^{m}	−33° 15′
AHT 2	NGC 1245		Open cluster	Perseus	10′	03^{h} 14.7^{m}	+47° 14′
AHT 3	NGC 1300		Galaxy	Eridanus	5.5′ × 2.9′	03^{h} 19.7^{m}	−19° 25′
AHT 4	NGC 1491		Bright nebula	Perseus	25′ × 25′	04^{h} 03.4^{m}	+51° 19′
AHT 5	NGC 1514		Planetary nebula	Taurus	2.3′ × 2.0′	04^{h} 09^{m}	+30° 47′
AHT 6	NGC 2022		Planetary nebula	Orion	28′ × 27′	05^{h} 42.1^{m}	+09° 05′
AHT 7	NGC 3114		Open cluster	Carina	35′	10^{h} 02.7^{m}	−60° 06′
AHT 8	NGC 3918		Planetary nebula	Centaurus	12′	11^{h} 50.3^{m}	−57° 11′
AHT 9	IC 4406	Retina Nebula	Planetary nebula	Lupus	1.7′ × 0.6′	14^{h} 22.4^{m}	−44° 09′
AHT 10	NGC 5617		Open cluster	Centaurus	10′	14^{h} 29.7^{m}	−60° 42′
AHT 11	NGC 5846		Galaxy	Virgo	4.9′ × 4.4′	15^{h} 06.5^{m}	+01° 36′
AHT 12	NGC 5907	Splinter Galaxy	Galaxy	Draco	11.2′ × 1.9′	15^{h} 15.9^{m}	+56° 20′
AHT 13	NGC 5927		Globular cluster	Lupus	6′	15^{h} 28.0^{m}	−50° 40′
AHT 14	IC 4603		Bright nebula	Ophiuchus	35′ × 20′	16^{h} 25.6^{m}	−24° 28′
AHT 15	NGC 6356		Globular cluster	Ophiuchus	10′	17^{h} 23.6^{m}	−17° 49′
AHT 16	NGC 6388		Globular cluster	Scorpius	10.4′	17^{h} 36.3^{m}	−44° 44′
AHT 17	NGC 6664		Open cluster	Scutum	12′	18^{h} 36.5^{m}	−08° 11′
AHT 18	NGC 6781	Ghost of the Moon	Planetary nebula	Aquila	1.9′ × 1.8′	19^{h} 18.5^{m}	+06° 32′
AHT 19	NGC 6905	Blue Flash Nebula	Planetary nebula	Delphinus	42′ × 35′	20^{h} 22.4^{m}	+20° 06′
AHT 20	NGC 6939	Ghost Bush Cluster	Open cluster	Cepheus	10′	20^{h} 31.5^{m}	+60° 40′

== Secret Deep catalogue ==
The Secret Deep (2011) also presents an original list of 109 deep-sky objects intended to complement the Messier and Caldwell lists; none of the Secret Deep (SD) objects are duplicated in the Messier and Caldwell catalogues, although some are duplicates of Additional Hidden Treasures (AHT) objects published in 2007. All Secret Deep objects are visible from mid-northern latitudes. Combined with the supplementary list of 21 additional objects, there are 130 objects total. Secret Deep objects are generally visible through 5-inch refractor telescopes under dark skies, since O'Meara used a Tele Vue NP-127 Nagler–Petzval 5-inch (660-mm) f/5.2 apochromatic refractor telescope to observe all Secret Deep objects.

Galaxy pairs are:

- SD 40, SD 41 (NGC 3166, NGC 3169)
- SD 43, SD 44 (NGC 3226, NGC 3227)
- SD 55, SD 56 (NGC 4435, NGC 4438)
- SD 60, SD 61 (NGC 4473, NGC 4477)
- ASD 11, ASD 12 (NGC 3607, NGC 3608)

Possibly a binary cluster:

- SD 87, SD 88 (NGC 6755, NGC 6756)

Secret Deep (SD) objects
SD no.	Designation	Common name(s)	Object type	Constellation	Apparent dimensions	Right ascension (J2000)	Declination (J2000)
SD 1	van den Bergh 1		Bright nebula	Cassiopeia	5′ × 5′	00^{h} 11.0^{m}	+58° 46′
SD 2	NGC 134	Giant Squid Galaxy	Galaxy	Sculptor	8.5′ × 1.9′	00^{h} 30.4^{m}	−33° 15′
SD 3	NGC 488	Whirligig Galaxy	Galaxy	Pisces	5.5′ × 4.0′	01^{h} 21.8^{m}	+05° 15′
SD 4	NGC 654	Fuzzy Butterfly Cluster	Open cluster	Cassiopeia	6′	01^{h} 44.0^{m}	+61° 53′
SD 5	Collinder 463	Loch Ness Monster Cluster; The Queen's Reflection	Open cluster	Cassiopeia	57′	01^{h} 45.7^{m}	+71° 49′
SD 6	Stock 2	9 (Stitchpunks)	Open cluster	Cassiopeia	60′	02^{h} 14.7^{m}	+59° 29′
SD 7	NGC 936	Darth Vader's Starfighter	Galaxy	Cetus	5.7′ × 4.6′	02^{h} 27.6^{m}	−01° 09′
SD 8	NGC 1084		Galaxy	Eridanus	3.2′ × 1.9′	02^{h} 46.0^{m}	−07° 35′
SD 9	NGC 1245	Patrick Starfish	Open cluster	Perseus	10′	03^{h} 14.7^{m}	+47° 14′
SD 10	NGC 1300		Galaxy	Eridanus	5.5′ × 2.9′	03^{h} 19.7^{m}	−19° 25′
SD 11	NGC 1342	Stingray Cluster; Sea Robin Cluster	Open cluster	Perseus	17′	03^{h} 31.7^{m}	+37° 22.5′
SD 12	NGC 1400		Galaxy	Eridanus	2.8′ × 2.5′	03^{h} 39.5^{m}	−18° 41′
SD 13	NGC 1407		Galaxy	Eridanus	6.0′ × 5.8′	03^{h} 40.2^{m}	−18° 35′
SD 14	NGC 1491	Fossil Footprint	Bright nebula	Perseus	4′ (blue)	04^{h} 03.4^{m}	+51° 19′
SD 15	NGC 1514	Crystal Ball Nebula	Planetary nebula	Taurus	2.3′ × 2.0′	04^{h} 09.6^{m}	+30° 46.5′
SD 16	NGC 1579	Northern Trifid Nebula	Bright nebula	Perseus	12′ × 8′	04^{h} 30.2^{m}	+35° 16′
SD 17	NGC 1750 (= NGC 1746)		Open cluster	Taurus	30′	05^{h} 04.3^{m}	+23° 44′
SD 18	NGC 1758		Open cluster	Taurus	10′	05^{h} 04.7^{m}	+23° 48′
SD 19	NGC 1788	Cosmic Bat Nebula; Foxface Nebula	Bright nebula	Orion	5′ × 3′	05^{h} 06.9^{m}	−03° 21′
SD 20	NGC 1807	Poor Man's Double Cluster	Open cluster	Taurus	12′	05^{h} 10.8^{m}	+16° 31′
SD 21	NGC 1817	Poor Man's Double Cluster	Open cluster	Taurus	20′	05^{h} 12.4^{m}	+16° 41′
SD 22	IC 417 / Stock 8	Spider Nebula	Bright nebula / open cluster	Auriga	13′ × 10′	05^{h} 28.1^{m}	+34° 26′
SD 23	NGC 1931	Fly Nebula	Bright nebula / open cluster	Auriga	4′	05^{h} 31.4^{m}	+34° 15′
SD 24	Collinder 70	Orion's Belt; Serpentine Column	Open cluster	Orion	140′	05^{h} 35.6^{m}	−01° 05′
SD 25	NGC 2022	Kissing Crescents Nebula	Planetary nebula	Orion	22″ × 17″	05^{h} 42.1^{m}	+09° 05′
SD 26	Sharpless 2-276		Supernova remnant	Orion	90′ × 30′	05^{h} 52.5^{m}	+00° 45′
SD 27	IC 2149		Planetary nebula	Auriga	8.5′	05^{h} 56.4^{m}	+46° 06′
SD 28	NGC 2149		Bright nebula	Monoceros	3′ × 2′	06^{h} 03.5^{m}	−09° 44′
SD 29	NGC 2170		Bright nebula	Monoceros	2′ × 2′	06^{h} 07.5^{m}	−06° 24′
SD 30	NGC 2281	Broken Heart Cluster	Open cluster	Auriga	25′	06^{h} 48.3^{m}	+41° 05′
SD 31	NGC 2298		Globular cluster	Puppis	5′	06^{h} 49.0^{m}	−36° 00′
SD 32	NGC 2316		Bright nebula	Monoceros	4′ × 3′	06^{h} 59.7^{m}	−07° 46′
SD 33	NGC 2343	Double Mint Cluster	Open cluster	Monoceros	6′	07^{h} 08.1^{m}	−10° 37′
SD 34	NGC 2346	Crimson Butterfly Nebula	Planetary nebula	Monoceros	> 50″	07^{h} 09.4^{m}	−00° 48′
SD 35	NGC 2359	Flying Eye Nebula; Thor's Helmet; Duck Head Nebula	Bright nebula	Canis Major	9′ × 6′	07^{h} 18.6^{m}	−13° 12′
SD 36	NGC 2371/2372	Double Bubble Nebula	Planetary nebula	Gemini	58″	07^{h} 25.5^{m}	+29° 29′
SD 37	NGC 2420	Twinkling Comet Cluster	Open cluster	Gemini	6′	07^{h} 38.4^{m}	+21° 34′
SD 38	NGC 3079	Phantom Frisbee Galaxy	Galaxy	Ursa Major	8.0′ × 1.5′	10^{h} 02.0^{m}	+55° 41′
SD 39	NGC 3077		Galaxy	Ursa Major	5.5′ × 4.1′	10^{h} 03.3^{m}	+68° 44′
SD 40	NGC 3166		Galaxy	Sextans	4.6′ × 2.6′	10^{h} 13.8^{m}	+03° 26′
SD 41	NGC 3169		Galaxy	Sextans	5.0′ × 2.8′	10^{h} 14.2^{m}	+03° 28′
SD 42	NGC 3198		Galaxy	Ursa Major	9.2′ × 3.5′	10^{h} 19.9^{m}	+45° 33′
SD 43	NGC 3226		Galaxy	Leo	2.5′ × 2.2′	10^{h} 23.4^{m}	+19° 54′
SD 44	NGC 3227		Galaxy	Leo	6.9′ × 5.4′	10^{h} 23.5^{m}	+19° 52′
SD 45	NGC 3432	Knitting Needle Galaxy	Galaxy	Leo Minor	6.9′ × 1.9′	10^{h} 52.5^{m}	+36° 37′
SD 46	NGC 3675		Galaxy	Ursa Major	6.2′ × 3.2′	11^{h} 26.1^{m}	+43° 35′
SD 47	NGC 3893		Galaxy	Ursa Major	4.2′ × 2.3′	11^{h} 48.6^{m}	+48° 43′
SD 48	NGC 3953 (Messier 109?)		Galaxy	Ursa Major	6.0′ × 3.2′	11^{h} 53.8^{m}	+52° 20′
SD 49	NGC 4036		Galaxy	Ursa Major	3.8′ × 1.9′	12^{h} 01.4^{m}	+61° 54′
SD 50	NGC 4051		Galaxy	Ursa Major	5.5′ × 4.6′	12^{h} 03.2^{m}	+44° 32′
SD 51	NGC 4111		Galaxy	Canes Venatici	4.4′ × 0.9′	12^{h} 07.1^{m}	+43° 04′
SD 52	NGC 4147	Kick the Can Cluster	Globular cluster	Coma Berenices	4′	12^{h} 10.1^{m}	+18° 32.5′
SD 53	NGC 4293		Galaxy	Coma Berenices	5.3′ × 3.1′	12^{h} 21.2^{m}	+18° 23′
SD 54	NGC 4414		Galaxy	Coma Berenices	4.4′ × 3.0′	12^{h} 26.4^{m}	+31° 13′
SD 55	NGC 4435	The Eyes	Galaxy	Virgo	3.2′ × 2.0′	12^{h} 27.7^{m}	+13° 05′
SD 56	NGC 4438	The Eyes	Galaxy	Virgo	8.9′ × 3.6′	12^{h} 27.8^{m}	+13° 01′
SD 57	NGC 4450		Galaxy	Coma Berenices	5.0′ × 3.4′	12^{h} 28.5^{m}	+17° 05′
SD 58	NGC 4461		Galaxy	Virgo	3.7′ × 1.4′	12^{h} 29.0^{m}	+13° 11′
SD 59	3C 273		Quasar	Virgo	—	12^{h} 29.1^{m}	+02° 03′
SD 60	NGC 4473		Galaxy	Coma Berenices	3.7′ × 2.4′	12^{h} 29.8^{m}	+13° 26′
SD 61	NGC 4477		Galaxy	Coma Berenices	3.9′ × 3.6′	12^{h} 30.0^{m}	+13° 38′
SD 62	NGC 4636		Galaxy	Virgo	7.1′ × 5.2′	12^{h} 42.8^{m}	+02° 41′
SD 63	NGC 4665		Galaxy	Virgo	4.1′ × 4.1′	12^{h} 45.1^{m}	+03° 03′
SD 64	NGC 4753	Dust Devil Galaxy	Galaxy	Virgo	4.1′ × 2.3′	12^{h} 52.4^{m}	−01° 12′
SD 65	NGC 4762	Paper-Kite Galaxy	Galaxy	Virgo	9.1′ × 2.2′	12^{h} 52.9^{m}	+11° 04′
SD 66	NGC 5033	Waterbug Galaxy	Galaxy	Canes Venatici	10.5′ × 5.1′	13^{h} 13.4^{m}	+36° 36′
SD 67	NGC 5195		Galaxy	Canes Venatici	6.4′ × 4.6′	13^{h} 30.0^{m}	+47° 16′
SD 68	NGC 5466	Snowglobe Cluster; Ghost Globular	Globular cluster	Boötes	9′	14^{h} 05.4^{m}	+28° 32′
SD 69	NGC 5846		Galaxy	Virgo	3.0′ × 3.0′	15^{h} 06.4^{m}	+01° 36′
SD 70	NGC 5907	Splinter Galaxy; Knife-Edge Galaxy; Cat Scratch Galaxy	Galaxy	Draco	11.5′ × 1.7′	15^{h} 15.9^{m}	+56° 20′
SD 71	IC 4593	White-Eyed Pea Nebula	Planetary nebula	Hercules	> 12″	16^{h} 11.7^{m}	+12° 04′
SD 72	NGC 6144		Globular cluster	Scorpius	9′	16^{h} 27.2^{m}	−26° 01′
SD 73	NGC 6207		Galaxy	Hercules	3.0′ × 1.1′	16^{h} 43.1^{m}	+36° 50′
SD 74	NGC 6229	"Prize Comet Cluster"	Globular cluster	Hercules	4.5′	16^{h} 46.9^{m}	+47° 32′
SD 75	NGC 6293		Globular cluster	Ophiuchus	7.9′	17^{h} 10.2^{m}	−26° 35′
SD 76	NGC 6309	Box Nebula; Exclamation Mark	Planetary nebula	Ophiuchus	> 16″	17^{h} 14.1^{m}	−12° 55′
SD 77	NGC 6356		Globular cluster	Ophiuchus	10′	17^{h} 23.6^{m}	−17° 49′
SD 78	NGC 6522		Globular cluster	Sagittarius	9.4′	18^{h} 03.6^{m}	−30° 02′
SD 79	NGC 6528		Globular cluster	Sagittarius	3.7′	18^{h} 04.8^{m}	−30° 03′
SD 80	NGC 6563	Southern Ring Nebula	Planetary nebula	Sagittarius	50″ × 38″	18^{h} 12.1^{m}	−33° 52′
SD 81	NGC 6589		Bright nebula	Sagittarius	5′ × 3′	18^{h} 16.9^{m}	−19° 47′
SD 82	NGC 6595 (= NGC 6590)		Bright nebula	Sagittarius	4′ × 3′	18^{h} 17.1^{m}	−19° 52′
SD 83	NGC 6638		Globular cluster	Sagittarius	7.3′	18^{h} 30.9^{m}	−25° 30′
SD 84	NGC 6664	Santa's Sleigh; Teacup Cluster	Open cluster	Scutum	12′	18^{h} 36.5^{m}	−08° 11′
SD 85	NGC 6717 (Palomar 9)		Globular cluster	Sagittarius	5.4′	18^{h} 55.1^{m}	−22° 42′
SD 86	NGC 6751	Glowing Eye Nebula; Dandelion Puff Ball Nebula	Planetary nebula	Aquila	24″	19^{h} 05.9^{m}	−05° 59.5′
SD 87	NGC 6755		Open cluster	Aquila	15′	19^{h} 07.8^{m}	+04° 16′
SD 88	NGC 6756		Open cluster	Aquila	4′	19^{h} 08.7^{m}	+04° 42′
SD 89	NGC 6778	Son of M76	Planetary nebula	Aquila	20″ × 40″	19^{h} 18.4^{m}	−01° 36′
SD 90	NGC 6781	Ghost of the Moon	Planetary nebula	Aquila	2′	19^{h} 18.5^{m}	+06° 32′
SD 91	NGC 6804	Incredible Shrinking Nebula; Snowball Nebula	Planetary nebula	Aquila	~50″	19^{h} 31.6^{m}	+09° 13′
SD 92	NGC 6811	Smoke Ring Cluster; Hole in a Cluster; Reliquary Cluster	Open cluster	Cygnus	15′	19^{h} 37.2^{m}	+46° 22.5′
SD 93	Cygnus X-1 (HDE 226868)		Black hole (with companion star)	Cygnus	—	19^{h} 58.4^{m}	+35° 12′
SD 94	O'Meara 3 (Alessi J20053+4732)		Asterism	Cygnus	12′	20^{h} 05.3^{m}	+47° 32′
SD 95	NGC 6891		Planetary nebula	Delphinus	> 18″	20^{h} 15.2^{m}	+12° 42′
SD 96	NGC 6894	Diamond Ring Nebula	Planetary nebula	Cygnus	> 42″	20^{h} 16.4^{m}	+30° 34′
SD 97	IC 1318		Bright nebula	Cygnus	45′ × 20′	20^{h} 16.6^{m}	+41° 49′
SD 98	NGC 6905	Blue Flash Nebula; Caged Spirit Nebula	Planetary nebula	Delphinus	42″ × 35″	20^{h} 22.4^{m}	+20° 06′
SD 99	NGC 6910	Inchworm Cluster	Open cluster	Cygnus	10′	20^{h} 23.2^{m}	+40° 47′
SD 100	NGC 6939	Flying Geese Cluster; Silk Fan Cluster	Open cluster	Cepheus	10′	20^{h} 31.5^{m}	+60° 40′
SD 101	NGC 7026	Cheeseburger Nebula; Burnham's Nebula	Planetary nebula	Cygnus	21″	21^{h} 06.3^{m}	+47° 51′
SD 102	NGC 7048	Peek-a-Boo Nebula	Planetary nebula	Cygnus	61″	21^{h} 14.2^{m}	+46° 17′
SD 103	NGC 7129	Cosmic Rosebud Nebula	Bright nebula	Cepheus	7′ × 7′	21^{h} 42.8^{m}	+66° 06′
SD 104	NGC 7160	Bruce Lee Cluster; Swimming Alligator Cluster	Open cluster	Cepheus	5′	21^{h} 53.7^{m}	+62° 36′
SD 105	NGC 7209	Star Lizard Cluster	Open cluster	Lacerta	15′	22^{h} 05.8^{m}	+46° 29′
SD 106	NGC 7354		Planetary nebula	Cepheus	22″ × 18″	22^{h} 40.3^{m}	+61° 17′
SD 107	NGC 7510	Dormouse Cluster	Open cluster	Cepheus	7′	23^{h} 11.1^{m}	+60° 34′
SD 108	NGC 7538	Northern Lagoon Nebula; Brain Nebula	Bright nebula	Cepheus	90′ × 60′	23^{h} 13.5^{m}	+61° 31′
SD 109	NGC 7790	Widow's Web Cluster	Open cluster	Cassiopeia	5′	23^{h} 58.4^{m}	+61° 12.5′

=== Additional Secret Deep objects ===
Additional Secret Deep (ASD) objects
ASD no.	Designation	Common name(s)	Object type	Constellation	Apparent dimensions	Right ascension (J2000)	Declination (J2000)
ASD 1	NGC 129		Open cluster	Cassiopeia	12′	00^{h} 29.9^{m}	+60° 13′
ASD 2	NGC 436		Open cluster	Cassiopeia	5′	01^{h} 15.9^{m}	+58° 49′
ASD 3	IC 1747	Holepunch Nebula	Planetary nebula	Cassiopeia	13″	01^{h} 57.6^{m}	+63° 20′
ASD 4	NGC 1499	California Nebula	Bright nebula	Perseus	160′ × 40′	04^{h} 00.7^{m}	+36° 37′
ASD 5	IC 2165		Planetary nebula	Canis Major	4″	06^{h} 21.7^{m}	−12° 59′
ASD 6	NGC 2232		Open cluster	Monoceros	53′	06^{h} 27.2^{m}	−04° 45′
ASD 7	NGC 2439		Open cluster	Puppis	9′	07^{h} 40.8^{m}	−31° 41.5′
ASD 8	NGC 2489		Open cluster	Puppis	5′	07^{h} 56.2^{m}	−30° 04′
ASD 9	NGC 2527		Open cluster	Puppis	10′	08^{h} 04.9^{m}	−28° 08′
ASD 10	UGC 5470	Leo I Dwarf	Galaxy	Leo	12.0′ × 9.3′	10^{h} 08.4^{m}	+12° 18′
ASD 11	NGC 3607		Galaxy	Leo	4.6′ × 4.1′	11^{h} 16.9^{m}	+18° 03′
ASD 12	NGC 3608		Galaxy	Leo	2.7′ × 2.3′	11^{h} 17.0^{m}	+18° 09′
ASD 13	NGC 3640		Galaxy	Leo	4.6′ × 4.1′	11^{h} 21.1^{m}	+03° 14′
ASD 14	NGC 3938		Galaxy	Ursa Major	4.9′ × 4.7′	11^{h} 52.8^{m}	+44° 07′
ASD 15	NGC 4698		Galaxy	Virgo	3.2′ × 1.7′	12^{h} 48.4^{m}	+08° 29′
ASD 16	NGC 5084		Galaxy	Virgo	11.0′ × 2.5′	13^{h} 20.3^{m}	−21° 50′
ASD 17	NGC 5634		Globular cluster	Virgo	5.5′	14^{h} 29.6^{m}	−05° 59′
ASD 18	NGC 5824		Globular cluster	Lupus	6′	15^{h} 04.0^{m}	−33° 04′
ASD 19	IC 4603		Bright nebula	Ophiuchus	35′ × 20′	16^{h} 25.6^{m}	−24° 28′
ASD 20	NGC 6603		Open cluster	Sagittarius	4′	18^{h} 18.5^{m}	−18° 24′
ASD 21	IC 1295		Planetary nebula	Scutum	> 86″	18^{h} 54.6^{m}	−08° 50′

== Southern Gems catalogue ==
Southern Gems (2013) lists 120 astronomical objects located exclusively in the southern celestial hemisphere. Combined with the supplementary list of 42 additional objects, there are 162 objects total. Equivalent designations from James Dunlop's catalogue are also provided, since the Southern Gems objects are O'Meara's selections of Dunlop objects. Some Southern Gems objects are also duplicated in the Messier and Caldwell catalogues. Southern Gems objects are all visible through 5-inch telescopes under dark skies.

Southern Gems (SG) objects
SG no.	Designation	Common name(s)	Dunlop catalogue no.	Object type	Constellation	Apparent dimensions	Right ascension (J2000)	Declination (J2000)
SG 1	NGC 55	String of Pearls	Dunlop 507	Galaxy	Sculptor	30.0′ × 6.3′	00^{h} 14.9^{m}	−39° 11′
SG 2	NGC 104	47 Tucanae; Xi Tucanae	Dunlop 18	Globular cluster	Tucana	50′	00^{h} 24.1^{m}	−72° 05′
SG 3	NGC 134	Giant Squid Galaxy	Dunlop 590 / Dunlop 599	Galaxy	Sculptor	8.5′ × 1.9′	00^{h} 30.4^{m}	−33° 15′
SG 4	NGC 300	Southern Pinwheel	Dunlop 530	Galaxy	Sculptor	20.0′ × 13.0′	00^{h} 54.9^{m}	−37° 41′
SG 5	NGC 362		Dunlop 62	Globular cluster	Tucana	14′	01^{h} 03.2^{m}	−70° 51′
SG 6	NGC 613		Dunlop 621	Galaxy	Sculptor	5.2′ × 2.6′	01^{h} 34.3^{m}	−29° 25′
SG 7	NGC 625		Dunlop 479	Galaxy	Phoenix	6.5′ × 2.1′	01^{h} 35.1^{m}	−41° 26′
SG 8	NGC 986		Dunlop 519	Galaxy	Fornax	3.8′ × 1.9′	02^{h} 33.6^{m}	−39° 02′
SG 9	NGC 1097		Dunlop 625?	Galaxy	Fornax	9.8′ × 6.1′	02^{h} 46.3^{m}	−30° 16′
SG 10	NGC 1261		Dunlop 337	Globular cluster	Horologium	6.8′	03^{h} 12.25^{m}	−55° 13′
SG 11	NGC 1291	Snow Collar Galaxy	Dunlop 487	Galaxy	Eridanus	11.1′ × 10.1′	03^{h} 17.3^{m}	−41° 06′
SG 12	NGC 1313		Dunlop 206	Galaxy	Reticulum	11.0′ × 7.6′	03^{h} 18.3^{m}	−66° 30′
SG 13	NGC 1316	Fornax A	Dunlop 548	Galaxy	Fornax	13.5′ × 9.3′	03^{h} 22.7^{m}	−37° 12′
SG 14	NGC 1317		Dunlop 547	Galaxy	Fornax	3.5′ × 3.0′	03^{h} 22.8^{m}	−37° 06′
SG 15	NGC 1350	The Colossal Cosmic Eye	Dunlop 591	Galaxy	Fornax	6.2′ × 3.2′	03^{h} 31.1^{m}	−33° 38′
SG 16	NGC 1365		Dunlop 562	Galaxy	Fornax	11.2′ × 5.9′	03^{h} 33.6^{m}	−36° 08′
SG 17	NGC 1380		Dunlop 574	Galaxy	Fornax	4.8′ × 2.8′	03^{h} 36.5^{m}	−34° 59′
SG 18	NGC 1433		Dunlop 426	Galaxy	Horologium	5.5′ × 3.2′	03^{h} 42.0^{m}	−47° 13′
SG 19	NGC 1512		Dunlop 466	Galaxy	Horologium	8.3′ × 3.6′	04^{h} 03.9^{m}	−43° 21′
SG 20	NGC 1527		Dunlop 409	Galaxy	Horologium	4.2′ × 1.8′	04^{h} 08.4^{m}	−47° 53′
SG 21	NGC 1532		Dunlop 600	Galaxy	Eridanus	11.2′ × 3.2′	04^{h} 12.1^{m}	−32° 52′
SG 22	NGC 1543		Dunlop 306	Galaxy	Reticulum	7.2′ × 4.9′	04^{h} 12.8^{m}	−57° 44′
SG 23	NGC 1553		Dunlop 331	Galaxy	Dorado	6.3′ × 4.4′	04^{h} 16.2^{m}	−55° 47′
SG 24	NGC 1559		Dunlop 264	Galaxy	Reticulum	4.3′ × 2.2′	04^{h} 17.6^{m}	−62° 47′
SG 25	NGC 1566		Dunlop 338	Galaxy	Dorado	7.1′ × 4.8′	04^{h} 20.0^{m}	−54° 56′
SG 26	NGC 1617		Dunlop 339	Galaxy	Dorado	4.8′ × 2.2′	04^{h} 31.7^{m}	−54° 36′
SG 27	NGC 1672		Dunlop 296	Galaxy	Dorado	6.2′ × 3.4′	04^{h} 45.7^{m}	−59° 15′
SG 28	NGC 1792		Dunlop 531	Galaxy	Columba	5.5′ × 2.5′	05^{h} 05.2^{m}	−37° 59′
SG 29	NGC 1808		Dunlop 549	Galaxy	Columba	5.2′ × 2.3′	05^{h} 07.7^{m}	−37° 31′
SG 30	NGC 1851		Dunlop 508	Globular cluster	Columba	12′	05^{h} 14.1^{m}	−40° 03′
SG 31	NGC 1947		Dunlop 421 (unpublished notes)	Galaxy	Dorado	3.6′ × 3.2′	05^{h} 26.8^{m}	−63° 46′
SG 32	NGC 2090		Dunlop 594	Galaxy	Columba	4.5′ × 2.3′	05^{h} 47.0^{m}	−34° 14′
SG 33	NGC 2298		Dunlop 578	Globular cluster	Puppis	5′	06^{h} 49.0^{m}	−36° 00′
SG 34	NGC 2477		Dunlop 535	Open cluster	Puppis	20′	07^{h} 52.2^{m}	−38° 32′
SG 35	NGC 2516	Southern Beehive	Dunlop 501 (unpublished notes)	Open cluster	Carina	22′	07^{h} 58.0^{m}	−60° 45′
SG 36	NGC 2547	Golden Earring Cluster; St. Peter's Cross; Malus Cluster	Dunlop 410	Open cluster	Vela	25′	08^{h} 10.2^{m}	−49° 13′
SG 37	NGC 2546	Heart & Dagger Cluster; "Wounded Heart" Cluster	Dunlop 563	Open cluster	Puppis	70′	08^{h} 12.4^{m}	−37° 37′
SG 38	NGC 2808		Dunlop 265	Globular cluster	Carina	14′	09^{h} 12.0^{m}	−64° 52′
SG 39	NGC 2818		Dunlop 564	Planetary nebula	Pyxis	38″	09^{h} 16.1^{m}	−36° 38′
SG 40	Melotte 96		Dunlop 564	Open cluster	Pyxis	8′	09^{h} 16.2^{m}	−36° 37′
SG 41	NGC 2997		Dunlop 622	Galaxy	Antlia	10.0′ × 6.3′	09^{h} 45.6^{m}	−31° 11′
SG 42	NGC 3114		Dunlop 297	Open cluster	Carina	35′	10^{h} 02.7^{m}	−60° 06′
SG 43	NGC 3132	Southern Ring Nebula; Eight-Burst Nebula	Dunlop (unpublished notes)	Planetary nebula	Vela	84″ × 53″	10^{h} 07.0^{m}	−40° 26′
SG 44	NGC 3199		Dunlop 332	Bright nebula	Carina	20′ × 15′	10^{h} 16.8^{m}	−57° 57′
SG 45	NGC 3201		Dunlop 445	Globular cluster	Vela	20′	10^{h} 17.6^{m}	−46° 25′
SG 46	NGC 3293	Spider Spit Cluster; Little Jewel Box	Dunlop 321	Open cluster	Carina	5′	10^{h} 35.8^{m}	−58° 13′
SG 47	IC 2602	Theta Carinae Cluster; Southern Pleiades	Dunlop 258	Open cluster	Carina	100′	10^{h} 42.9^{m}	−64° 24′
SG 48	NGC 3372	Eta Carinae Nebula; Keyhole Nebula	Dunlop 309	Bright nebula	Carina	120′ (var.)	10^{h} 43.8^{m}	−59° 52′
SG 49	NGC 3532	Pin Cushion Cluster	Dunlop 323	Open cluster	Carina	50′	11^{h} 05.5^{m}	−58° 44′
SG 50	IC 2714	Rip-Torn Cluster	Dunlop 281	Open cluster	Carina	15′	11^{h} 17.3^{m}	−62° 43′
SG 51	NGC 3621	Southern Cross Galaxy; Frame Galaxy	Dunlop 617	Galaxy	Hydra	9.8′ × 4.6′	11^{h} 18.3^{m}	−32° 49′
SG 52	Melotte 105		Dunlop 271	Open cluster	Carina	5′	11^{h} 20.3^{m}	−63° 29′
SG 53	NGC 3766	Rich Man's Jewel Box	Dunlop 289	Open cluster	Carina	15′	11^{h} 36.2^{m}	−61° 37′
SG 54	NGC 3918	Blue Planetary; The Southerner	Dunlop (unpublished notes)	Planetary nebula	Centaurus	12″	11^{h} 50.3^{m}	−57° 11′
SG 55	NGC 4103	The Longtail	Dunlop 291	Open cluster	Crux	6′	12^{h} 06.7^{m}	−61° 15′
SG 56	NGC 4372		Dunlop 67	Globular cluster	Musca	5′	12^{h} 25.8^{m}	−72° 40′
SG 57	NGC 4696		Dunlop 510	Galaxy	Centaurus	5.4′ × 3.9′	12^{h} 48.8^{m}	−41° 19′
SG 58	NGC 4755	Kappa Crucis; Jewel Box Cluster	Dunlop 301	Open cluster	Crux	10′	12^{h} 53.6^{m}	−60° 21′
SG 59	NGC 4833	The Southern Butterfly	Dunlop 164	Globular cluster	Musca	13.5′	12^{h} 59.6^{m}	−70° 52.5′
SG 60	NGC 4945	Tweezers Galaxy	Dunlop 411	Galaxy	Centaurus	18.6′ × 3.5′	13^{h} 05.4^{m}	−49° 28′
SG 61	NGC 5128	Centaurus A; Hamburger Galaxy	Dunlop 482	Galaxy	Centaurus	16.7′ × 13.0′	13^{h} 25.5^{m}	−43° 01′
SG 62	NGC 5139	Omega Centauri	Dunlop 440	Globular cluster	Centaurus	55′	13^{h} 26.8^{m}	−47° 29′
SG 63	NGC 5189	Spiral Planetary	Dunlop 252	Planetary nebula	Musca	153″ × 10.3″	13^{h} 33.5^{m}	−65° 59′
SG 64	NGC 5236	Thousand Rubies Galaxy	Dunlop 628	Galaxy	Hydra	12.9′ × 11.5′	13^{h} 37.0^{m}	−29° 52′
SG 65	NGC 5253		Dunlop 623	Galaxy	Centaurus	5.1′ × 2.3′	13^{h} 39.9^{m}	−31° 39′
SG 66	NGC 5286		Dunlop 388	Globular cluster	Centaurus	11′	13^{h} 46.4^{m}	−51° 22′
SG 67	NGC 5281	Little Scorpion Cluster	Dunlop 273	Open cluster	Centaurus	8′	13^{h} 46.6^{m}	−62° 55′
SG 68	NGC 5460		Dunlop 431	Open cluster	Centaurus	35′	14^{h} 07.6^{m}	−48° 18′
SG 69	NGC 5617	Dracula Cluster	Dunlop 302	Open cluster	Centaurus	10′	14^{h} 29.7^{m}	−60° 42′
SG 70	NGC 5643		Dunlop 469	Galaxy	Lupus	5.1′ × 4.3′	14^{h} 32.7^{m}	−44° 10′
SG 71	NGC 5824		Dunlop 611	Globular cluster	Lupus	7.4′	15^{h} 04.0^{m}	−33° 04′
SG 72	NGC 5882	Ghost of Uranus	Dunlop 447	Planetary nebula	Lupus	7″	15^{h} 16.8^{m}	−45° 39′
SG 73	NGC 5927		Dunlop 389	Globular cluster	Lupus	6′	15^{h} 28.0^{m}	−50° 40′
SG 74	NGC 5946		Dunlop 389 (unpublished notes)	Globular cluster	Norma	3′	15^{h} 35.5^{m}	−50° 40′
SG 75	NGC 5986		Dunlop 552	Globular cluster	Lupus	9.6′	15^{h} 46.1^{m}	−37° 47′
SG 76	NGC 6025		Dunlop 304	Open cluster	Triangulum Australe	15′	16^{h} 03.3^{m}	−60° 25′
SG 77	NGC 6067		Dunlop 360	Open cluster	Norma	15′	16^{h} 13.1^{m}	−54° 13′
SG 78	NGC 6087	S Normae Cluster	Dunlop 335	Open cluster	Norma	15′	16^{h} 18.9^{m}	−57° 54′
SG 79	NGC 6124		Dunlop 514	Open cluster	Scorpius	40′	16^{h} 25.3^{m}	−40° 40′
SG 80	NGC 6101		Dunlop 68	Globular cluster	Apus	10.7′	16^{h} 25.8^{m}	−72° 12′
SG 81	NGC 6139		Dunlop 536	Globular cluster	Scorpius	8.2′	16^{h} 27.7^{m}	−38° 51′
SG 82	NGC 6134	Little Pincushion	Dunlop 412	Open cluster	Norma	8′	16^{h} 27.8^{m}	−49° 10′
SG 83	NGC 6192		Dunlop 483	Open cluster	Scorpius	9′	16^{h} 40.3^{m}	−43° 22′
SG 84	NGC 6193		Dunlop 413	Open cluster	Ara	14′	16^{h} 41.3^{m}	−48° 26′
SG 85	NGC 6231	False Comet Cluster; Crocodile Cluster	Dunlop 499	Open cluster	Scorpius	14′	16^{h} 54.2^{m}	−41° 50′
SG 86	NGC 6242		Dunlop 520	Open cluster	Scorpius	9′	16^{h} 55.5^{m}	−39° 28′
SG 87	NGC 6281	Moth Wing Cluster	Dunlop 556	Open cluster	Scorpius	8′	17^{h} 04.8^{m}	−37° 53′
SG 88	NGC 6316		Dunlop 629	Globular cluster	Ophiuchus	5.4′	17^{h} 16.6^{m}	−28° 08′
SG 89	IC 4651		Dunlop 402	Open cluster	Ara	10′	17^{h} 24.7^{m}	−49° 55′
SG 90	NGC 6352		Dunlop 417	Globular cluster	Ara	9.0′	17^{h} 25.5^{m}	−48° 25′
SG 91	NGC 6362		Dunlop 225	Globular cluster	Ara	15′	17^{h} 31.9^{m}	−67° 03′
SG 92	NGC 6388		Dunlop 457	Globular cluster	Scorpius	10.4′	17^{h} 36.3^{m}	−44° 44′
SG 93	NGC 6400	Phantom Cluster	Dunlop 568	Open cluster	Scorpius	12′	17^{h} 40.2^{m}	−36° 58′
SG 94	NGC 6405	Butterfly Cluster	Dunlop 612	Open cluster	Scorpius	33′	17^{h} 40.3^{m}	−32° 15.5′
SG 95	NGC 6397		Dunlop 366	Globular cluster	Ara	31′	17^{h} 40.7^{m}	−53° 40′
SG 96	NGC 6441	Silver Nugget Cluster	Dunlop 557	Globular cluster	Scorpius	9.6′	17^{h} 50.2^{m}	−37° 03′
SG 97	Barnard 283		Dunlop 605	Dark nebula	Scorpius	90′ × 60′	17^{h} 51.3^{m}	−33° 53′
SG 98	NGC 6496		Dunlop 460	Globular cluster	Scorpius	5.6′	17^{h} 59.0^{m}	−44° 16′
SG 99	NGC 6522		Dunlop 1160 (unpublished notes)	Globular cluster	Sagittarius	9.4′	18^{h} 03.6^{m}	−30° 02′
SG 100	NGC 6523	Lagoon Nebula	Dunlop 1191 (unpublished notes)	Bright nebula	Sagittarius	45′ × 30′	18^{h} 03.8^{m}	−24° 23′
SG 101	NGC 6541	Cacciatore Cluster	Dunlop 473	Globular cluster	Corona Australis	15′	18^{h} 08.0^{m}	−43° 43′
SG 102	NGC 6563	Southern Ring	Dunlop 606	Planetary nebula	Sagittarius	50″ × 38″	18^{h} 12.1^{m}	−33° 52′
SG 103	NGC 6569		Dunlop 619	Globular cluster	Sagittarius	6.4′	18^{h} 13.6^{m}	−31° 50′
SG 104	NGC 6584		Dunlop 376	Globular cluster	Telescopium	6.6′	18^{h} 18.6^{m}	−52° 13′
SG 105	NGC 6624		Dunlop 1157 (unpublished notes)	Globular cluster	Sagittarius	8.8′	18^{h} 23.7^{m}	−30° 22′
SG 106	NGC 6637		Dunlop 613	Globular cluster	Sagittarius	10′	18^{h} 31.4^{m}	−32° 21′
SG 107	NGC 6652		Dunlop 607	Globular cluster	Sagittarius	6.0′	18^{h} 35.8^{m}	−32° 59′
SG 108	NGC 6656	Great Sagittarius Cluster; Crackerjack Cluster	Dunlop 1195 (unpublished notes)	Globular cluster	Sagittarius	32′	18^{h} 36.4^{m}	−23° 54′
SG 109	NGC 6715		Dunlop 624	Globular cluster	Sagittarius	12′	18^{h} 55.05^{m}	−30° 29′
SG 110	NGC 6723		Dunlop 573	Globular cluster	Sagittarius	13.0′	18^{h} 59.5^{m}	−36° 38′
SG 111	Bernes 157		Dunlop 559	Dark nebula	Corona Australis	57′	19^{h} 02.9^{m}	−37° 08′
SG 112	NGC 6744		Dunlop 262	Galaxy	Pavo	20.8′ × 13.3′	19^{h} 09.7^{m}	−63° 51′
SG 113	NGC 6752	The Starfish; The Windmill	Dunlop 295	Globular cluster	Pavo	29′	19^{h} 10.9^{m}	−59° 59′
SG 114	NGC 6809		Dunlop 620	Globular cluster	Sagittarius	19′	19^{h} 40.0^{m}	−30° 58′
SG 115	NGC 7410		Dunlop 518	Galaxy	Grus	5.8′ × 1.7′	22^{h} 55.0^{m}	−39° 40′
SG 116	NGC 7552		Dunlop 475	Galaxy	Grus	3.8′ × 2.2′	23^{h} 16.2^{m}	−42° 35′
SG 117	NGC 7582		Dunlop 476	Galaxy	Grus	6.9′ × 2.6′	23^{h} 18.4^{m}	−42° 22′
SG 118	NGC 7590		Dunlop 477 (1)	Galaxy	Grus	2.9′ × 1.2′	23^{h} 18.9^{m}	−42° 14′
SG 119	NGC 7599		Dunlop 477 (2)	Galaxy	Grus	4.7′ × 1.5′	23^{h} 19.3^{m}	−42° 15′
SG 120	NGC 7793		Dunlop 608	Galaxy	Sculptor	9.2′ × 6.4′	23^{h} 57.8^{m}	−32° 35′

=== Additional Southern Gems objects ===
Additional Southern Gems (ASG) objects
ASG no.	Designation	Dunlop catalogue no.	Object type	Constellation	Apparent dimensions	Right ascension (J2000)	Declination (J2000)
ASG 1	NGC 261	Dunlop 21	Bright nebula	Tucana (Small Magellanic Cloud)	1.3′	00^{h} 46.55^{m}	−73° 07′
ASG 2	NGC 330	Dunlop 23	Open cluster	Tucana (Small Magellanic Cloud)	1.4′	00^{h} 56.2^{m}	−72° 28′
ASG 3	NGC 346	Dunlop 25	Bright nebula	Tucana (Small Magellanic Cloud)	14′ × 11′	00^{h} 59.1^{m}	−72° 11′
ASG 4	NGC 371	Dunlop 31	Bright nebula	Tucana (Small Magellanic Cloud)	7.5′	01^{h} 03.3^{m}	−72° 05′
ASG 5	IC 1633	Dunlop 437	Galaxy	Phoenix	2.6′	01^{h} 09.9^{m}	−45° 55′
ASG 6	NGC 456	Dunlop 7	Bright nebula	Tucana (Small Magellanic Cloud)	15′	01^{h} 13.7^{m}	−73° 17′
ASG 7	NGC 602	Dunlop 17	Bright nebula	Tucana (Small Magellanic Cloud)	3.4′	01^{h} 29.6^{m}	−73° 33′
ASG 8	NGC 1487	Dunlop 480	Galaxy	Eridanus	2.2′ × 20′	03^{h} 55.8^{m}	−42° 22′
ASG 9	NGC 1515	Dunlop 348	Galaxy	Dorado	5.5′ × 1.4′	04^{h} 04.1^{m}	−54° 06′
ASG 10	NGC 1533	Dunlop 320	Galaxy	Dorado	3.0′ × 2.8′	04^{h} 09.9^{m}	−56° 07′
ASG 11	NGC 1763	Dunlop 230	Bright nebula	Dorado (Large Magellanic Cloud)	5′ × 3′	04^{h} 56.8^{m}	−66° 24′
ASG 12	NGC 1770	Dunlop 169	Bright nebula	Dorado (Large Magellanic Cloud)	3′ × 2′	04^{h} 57.2^{m}	−68° 25′
ASG 13	NGC 1850	Dunlop 172	Open cluster	Dorado (Large Magellanic Cloud)	3.4′	05^{h} 08.5^{m}	−68° 46′
ASG 14	NGC 1876	Dunlop 122	Bright nebula	Dorado (Large Magellanic Cloud)	1.5′	05^{h} 13.3^{m}	−69° 22′
ASG 15	NGC 1910	Dunlop 129	Stellar association	Dorado (Large Magellanic Cloud)	8.5′	05^{h} 18.1^{m}	−69° 13′
ASG 16	NGC 1935	Dunlop 175	Bright nebula	Dorado (Large Magellanic Cloud)	1.2′	05^{h} 22.0^{m}	−67° 57′
ASG 17	NGC 1965	Dunlop 136	Bright nebula	Dorado (Large Magellanic Cloud)	1.2′	05^{h} 26.6^{m}	−68° 48′
ASG 18	NGC 1968	Dunlop 188	Bright nebula	Dorado (Large Magellanic Cloud)	1.2′	05^{h} 27.4^{m}	−67° 28′
ASG 19	NGC 2004	Dunlop 216	Open cluster	Dorado (Large Magellanic Cloud)	2.7′	05^{h} 30.6^{m}	−67° 17′
ASG 20	NGC 2032	Dunlop 219	Bright nebula	Dorado (Large Magellanic Cloud)	2.8′	05^{h} 35.3^{m}	−67° 34′
ASG 21	NGC 2058	Dunlop 103	Open cluster	Dorado (Large Magellanic Cloud)	1.8′	05^{h} 36.9^{m}	−70° 10′
ASG 22	NGC 2070	Dunlop 142	Bright nebula	Dorado (Large Magellanic Cloud)	30′ × 20′	05^{h} 38.6^{m}	−69° 05′
ASG 23	NGC 2080	Dunlop 150	Bright nebula	Dorado (Large Magellanic Cloud)	15′	05^{h} 39.7^{m}	−69° 39′
ASG 24	NGC 2164	Dunlop 196	Open cluster	Dorado (Large Magellanic Cloud)	2.5′	05^{h} 58.9^{m}	−68° 31′
ASG 25	Markarian 18	Dunlop 430	Open cluster	Vela	2′	09^{h} 00.6^{m}	−48° 59′
ASG 26	NGC 3324	Dunlop 322	Bright nebula	Carina	16′ × 4′	10^{h} 37.7^{m}	−58° 40′
ASG 27	Melotte 101	Dunlop 258	Open cluster	Carina	13′	10^{h} 42.1^{m}	−65° 06′
ASG 28	NGC 3680	Dunlop 481	Open cluster	Centaurus	7′	11^{h} 25.6^{m}	−43° 15′
ASG 29	Harvard 6	Dunlop 224	Open cluster	Musca	5′	12^{h} 37.9^{m}	−68° 28′
ASG 30	NGC 4709	Dunlop 510	Galaxy	Centaurus	2.8′ × 2.4′	12^{h} 50.1^{m}	−41° 23′
ASG 31	Trumpler 23	Dunlop 358	Open cluster	Norma	5′	16^{h} 00.5^{m}	−53° 31′
ASG 32	Collinder 307	Dunlop 391	Open cluster	Ara	5′	16^{h} 35.2^{m}	−50° 58′
ASG 33	Messier 62 (NGC 6266)	Dunlop 627	Globular cluster	Ophiuchus	14.1′	17^{h} 01.2^{m}	−30° 07′
ASG 34	NGC 6268	Dunlop 521	Open cluster	Scorpius	6′	17^{h} 02.4^{m}	−39° 44′
ASG 35	NGC 6300	Dunlop (handwritten notes on microfiche)	Galaxy	Ara	5.2′ × 3.3′	17^{h} 17.0^{m}	−62° 49′
ASG 36	Messier 70 (NGC 6681)	Dunlop 614	Globular cluster	Sagittarius	7.8′	18^{h} 43.2^{m}	−32° 18′
ASG 37	NGC 6861	Dunlop 425	Galaxy	Telescopium	2.9′ × 1.9′	20^{h} 07.3^{m}	−48° 22′
ASG 38	NGC 6902	Dunlop 451	Galaxy	Sagittarius	4.1′ × 2.9′	20^{h} 24.5^{m}	−43° 39′
ASG 39	NGC 7049	Dunlop 406	Galaxy	Indus	4.3′ × 3.2′	21^{h} 19.0^{m}	−48° 34′
ASG 40	NGC 7083	Dunlop 263	Galaxy	Indus	3.6′ × 2.1′	21^{h} 35.7^{m}	−63° 54′
ASG 41	IC 5250	Dunlop 255	Galaxy	Tucana	3.1′	22^{h} 47.3^{m}	−65° 03′
ASG 42	IC 5332	Dunlop 546	Galaxy	Sculptor	6.0′ × 5.8′	23^{h} 34.5^{m}	−36° 06′

== Duplicate objects ==
=== Duplicates within O'Meara's catalogues ===
There are 381 unique objects from all 6 of O'Meara's catalogues combined after duplicates are accounted for. The following table lists the 39 objects that appear in more than one of O'Meara's catalogues. NGC 134 is listed three times, while all other entries are listed twice.

Duplicates in O'Meara's catalogues
Designation	Common name(s)	Object type	Constellation	HT	AHT	SD	ASD	SG	ASG
NGC 134	Giant Squid Galaxy	Galaxy	Sculptor		AHT 1	SD 2		SG 3	
NGC 1245	Patrick Starfish	Open cluster	Perseus		AHT 2	SD 9			
NGC 1291	Snow Collar Galaxy	Galaxy	Eridanus	HT 12				SG 11	
NGC 1300		Galaxy	Eridanus		AHT 3	SD 10			
NGC 1316	Fornax A	Galaxy	Fornax	HT 13				SG 13	
NGC 1365		Galaxy	Fornax	HT 17				SG 16	
NGC 1491	Fossil Footprint	Bright nebula	Perseus		AHT 4	SD 14			
NGC 1514	Crystal Ball Nebula	Planetary nebula	Taurus		AHT 5	SD 15			
NGC 2022	Kissing Crescents Nebula	Planetary nebula	Orion		AHT 6	SD 25			
NGC 2298		Globular cluster	Puppis			SD 31		SG 33	
NGC 2547	Golden Earring Cluster; St. Peter's Cross; Malus Cluster	Open cluster	Vela	HT 44				SG 36	
NGC 2546	Heart & Dagger Cluster; "Wounded Heart" Cluster	Open cluster	Puppis	HT 46				SG 37	
NGC 3114		Open cluster	Carina		AHT 7			SG 42	
NGC 3293	Spider Spit Cluster; Little Jewel Box	Open cluster	Carina	HT 54				SG 46	
NGC 3621	Frame Galaxy; Southern Cross Galaxy	Galaxy	Hydra	HT 57				SG 51	
NGC 3918	Blue Planetary; The Southerner	Planetary nebula	Centaurus		AHT 8			SG 54	
NGC 5281	Little Scorpion Cluster	Open cluster	Centaurus	HT 71				SG 67	
NGC 5617	Dracula Cluster	Open cluster	Centaurus		AHT 10			SG 69	
NGC 5824		Globular cluster	Lupus				ASD 18	SG 71	
NGC 5846		Galaxy	Virgo		AHT 11	SD 69			
NGC 5907	Splinter Galaxy; Knife-Edge Galaxy; Cat Scratch Galaxy	Galaxy	Draco		AHT 12	SD 70			
NGC 5927		Globular cluster	Lupus		AHT 13			SG 73	
NGC 5986		Globular cluster	Lupus	HT 77				SG 75	
IC 4603		Bright nebula	Ophiuchus		AHT 14		ASD 19		
NGC 6242		Open cluster	Scorpius	HT 79				SG 86	
NGC 6281	Moth Wing Cluster	Open cluster	Scorpius	HT 80				SG 87	
NGC 6356		Globular cluster	Ophiuchus		AHT 15	SD 77			
NGC 6388		Globular cluster	Scorpius		AHT 16			SG 92	
NGC 6400	Phantom Cluster; Long John Silver Cluster	Open cluster	Scorpius	HT 82				SG 93	
NGC 6441	Silver Nugget Cluster	Globular cluster	Scorpius	HT 86				SG 96	
NGC 6522		Globular cluster	Sagittarius			SD 78		SG 99	
NGC 6563	Southern Ring Nebula	Planetary nebula	Sagittarius			SD 80		SG 102	
NGC 6624		Globular cluster	Sagittarius	HT 91				SG 105	
NGC 6664	Santa's Sleigh; Teacup Cluster	Open cluster	Scutum		AHT 17	SD 84			
NGC 6723		Globular cluster	Sagittarius	HT 96				SG 110	
NGC 6781	Ghost of the Moon	Planetary nebula	Aquila		AHT 18	SD 90			
NGC 6905	Blue Flash Nebula; Caged Spirit Nebula	Planetary nebula	Delphinus		AHT 19	SD 98			
NGC 6939	Ghost Bush Cluster; Flying Geese Cluster; Silk Fan Cluster	Open cluster	Cepheus		AHT 20	SD 100			
NGC 7793	Bond's Galaxy	Galaxy	Sculptor	HT 109				SG 120	

=== Duplicates with Messier and Caldwell objects ===
There are 45 objects in O'Meara's catalogues that are also Messier (11 total) or Caldwell (34 total) objects:

Messier and Caldwell objects in O'Meara's catalogues
Messier / Caldwell	Designation	Object type	Constellation	HT	AHT	SD	ASD	SG	ASG
Messier 6	NGC 6405	Open cluster	Scorpius					SG 94	
Messier 8	NGC 6523	Bright nebula	Sagittarius					SG 100	
Messier 22	NGC 6656	Globular cluster	Sagittarius					SG 108	
Messier 51 (Note: M51 is sometimes considered to consist of NGC 5194 and NGC 5195 together. NGC 5195 is the Whirlpool Galaxy's companion galaxy; O'Meara lists it on its own as SD 67. If it is counted as part of M51, the combined total is 555 instead of 556.)	NGC 5195	Galaxy	Canes Venatici			SD 67			
Messier 54	NGC 6715	Globular cluster	Sagittarius					SG 109	
Messier 55	NGC 6809	Globular cluster	Sagittarius					SG 114	
Messier 62	NGC 6266	Globular cluster	Ophiuchus						ASG 33
Messier 69	NGC 6637	Globular cluster	Sagittarius					SG 106	
Messier 70	NGC 6681	Globular cluster	Sagittarius						ASG 36
Messier 83	NGC 5236	Galaxy	Hydra					SG 64	
Messier 102 (Note: Messier 102 (M102) is usually identified with NGC 5866, but some sources regard it as a duplicate observation of Messier 101 (M101). If M102 is not NGC 5866, then this entry is not a duplicate.)	NGC 5866	Galaxy	Draco	HT 75					
Caldwell 67	NGC 1097	Galaxy	Fornax					SG 9	
Caldwell 70	NGC 300	Galaxy	Sculptor					SG 4	
Caldwell 71	NGC 2477	Open cluster	Puppis					SG 34	
Caldwell 72	NGC 55	Galaxy	Sculptor					SG 1	
Caldwell 73	NGC 1851	Globular cluster	Columba					SG 30	
Caldwell 74	NGC 3132	Planetary nebula	Vela					SG 43	
Caldwell 75	NGC 6124	Open cluster	Scorpius					SG 79	
Caldwell 76	NGC 6231	Open cluster	Scorpius					SG 85	
Caldwell 77	NGC 5128	Galaxy	Centaurus					SG 61	
Caldwell 78	NGC 6541	Globular cluster	Corona Australis					SG 101	
Caldwell 79	NGC 3201	Globular cluster	Vela					SG 45	
Caldwell 80	NGC 5139	Globular cluster	Centaurus					SG 62	
Caldwell 81	NGC 6352	Globular cluster	Ara					SG 90	
Caldwell 82	NGC 6193	Open cluster	Ara					SG 84	
Caldwell 83	NGC 4945	Galaxy	Centaurus					SG 60	
Caldwell 84	NGC 5286	Globular cluster	Centaurus					SG 66	
Caldwell 86	NGC 6397	Globular cluster	Ara					SG 95	
Caldwell 87	NGC 1261	Globular cluster	Horologium					SG 10	
Caldwell 89	NGC 6087	Open cluster	Norma					SG 78	
Caldwell 91	NGC 3532	Open cluster	Carina					SG 49	
Caldwell 92	NGC 3372	Bright nebula	Carina					SG 48	
Caldwell 93	NGC 6752	Globular cluster	Pavo					SG 113	
Caldwell 94	NGC 4755	Open cluster	Crux					SG 58	
Caldwell 95	NGC 6025	Open cluster	Triangulum Australe					SG 76	
Caldwell 96	NGC 2516	Open cluster	Carina					SG 35	
Caldwell 97	NGC 3766	Open cluster	Carina					SG 53	
Caldwell 101	NGC 6744	Galaxy	Pavo					SG 112	
Caldwell 102	IC 2602	Open cluster	Carina					SG 47	
Caldwell 103	NGC 2070	Bright nebula	Dorado (Large Magellanic Cloud)						ASG 22
Caldwell 104	NGC 362	Globular cluster	Tucana					SG 5	
Caldwell 105	NGC 4833	Globular cluster	Musca					SG 59	
Caldwell 106	NGC 104	Globular cluster	Tucana					SG 2	
Caldwell 107	NGC 6101	Globular cluster	Apus					SG 80	
Caldwell 108	NGC 4372	Globular cluster	Musca					SG 56	

Overall, O'Meara's 5-volume Deep-Sky Companions series lists and describes a total of 556 unique astronomical objects. O'Meara's original catalogues provide a total of 337 unique objects that are not listed in the Messier and Caldwell catalogues.

Unique objects in the Messier, Caldwell, and O'Meara catalogues
Catalogue(s)	Entries	Duplicates	Unique objects
Messier	110	0	110
Caldwell	109	0	109
O'Meara (HT, AHT, SD, ASD, SG, ASG)	421	84 (Note: 40 repeats within O'Meara's own lists, plus 44 objects that are already Messier (10 total) or Caldwell (34 total) objects.)	337
Total	640	84	556 (Note: 555 total objects if NGC 5195 (SD 67) is counted as part of Messier 51.)

=== Duplicates with Herschel 400 objects ===
Objects in both O'Meara's catalogues and the Herschel 400 Catalogue (135 objects):

Objects in O'Meara's catalogues and the Herschel 400 Catalogue
Designation	Other names (or Dunlop catalogue no.)	O'Meara catalogue no.	Object type	Constellation	Apparent dimensions	Right ascension (J2000)	Declination (J2000)
NGC 129		ASD 1	Open cluster	Cassiopeia	12′	00^{h} 29.9^{m}	+60° 13′
NGC 225	Sailboat Cluster; Broken Heart Cluster	HT 2	Open cluster	Cassiopeia	15′	00^{h} 43.6^{m}	+61° 46′
NGC 288		HT 4	Globular cluster	Sculptor	13′	00^{h} 52.8^{m}	−26° 35′
NGC 404	Mirach's Ghost; Lost Pearl Galaxy; Comet Komorowski	HT 5	Galaxy	Andromeda	6.6′ × 6.6′	01^{h} 09.4^{m}	+35° 43′
NGC 436		ASD 2	Open cluster	Cassiopeia	5′	01^{h} 15.9^{m}	+58° 49′
NGC 488	Whirligig Galaxy	SD 3	Galaxy	Pisces	5.5′ × 4.0′	01^{h} 21.8^{m}	+05° 15′
NGC 584	Little Spindle Galaxy	HT 6	Galaxy	Cetus	3.8′ × 2.4′	01^{h} 31.3^{m}	−06° 52′
NGC 613	Dunlop 621	SG 6	Galaxy	Sculptor	5.2′ × 2.6′	01^{h} 34.3^{m}	−29° 25′
NGC 654	Fuzzy Butterfly Cluster	SD 4	Open cluster	Cassiopeia	6′	01^{h} 44.0^{m}	+61° 53′
NGC 659	Yin-Yang Cluster	HT 7	Open cluster	Cassiopeia	6′	01^{h} 44.4^{m}	+60° 40′
NGC 772	Fiddlehead Galaxy	HT 8	Galaxy	Aries	7.1′ × 4.7′	01^{h} 59.3^{m}	+19° 00′
NGC 908		HT 9	Galaxy	Cetus	6.1′ × 2.7′	02^{h} 23.1^{m}	−21° 14′
NGC 936	Darth Vader's Starfighter	SD 7	Galaxy	Cetus	5.7′ × 4.6′	02^{h} 27.6^{m}	−01° 09′
NGC 1023	Perseus Lenticular	HT 10	Galaxy	Perseus	7.5′ × 3.0′	02^{h} 40.4^{m}	+39° 04′
NGC 1084		SD 8	Galaxy	Eridanus	3.2′ × 1.9′	02^{h} 46.0^{m}	−07° 35′
NGC 1245	Patrick Starfish	AHT 2, SD 9	Open cluster	Perseus	10′	03^{h} 14.7^{m}	+47° 14′
NGC 1342	Stingray Cluster; Sea Robin Cluster	SD 11	Open cluster	Perseus	17′	03^{h} 31.7^{m}	+37° 22.5′
NGC 1407		SD 13	Galaxy	Eridanus	6.0′ × 5.8′	03^{h} 40.2^{m}	−18° 35′
NGC 1501	Oyster Nebula; Blue Oyster Nebula	HT 22	Planetary nebula	Camelopardalis	56′ × 48′	04^{h} 07.0^{m}	+60° 55′
NGC 1502	Jolly Roger Cluster	HT 23	Open cluster	Camelopardalis	20′	04^{h} 07.8^{m}	+62° 20′
NGC 1535	Cleopatra's Eye; Celestial Jellyfish Nebula; Ghost of Neptune Nebula	HT 24	Planetary nebula	Eridanus	48′ × 42′	04^{h} 14.3^{m}	−12° 44′
NGC 1528	M&M Double Cluster	HT 25	Open cluster	Perseus	18′	04^{h} 15.3^{m}	+51° 13′
NGC 1545	M&M Double Cluster; Running Man Cluster; Magic Pentagram Cluster	HT 26	Open cluster	Perseus	12′	04^{h} 20.9^{m}	+50° 15′
NGC 1647	Pirate Moon Cluster	HT 27	Open cluster	Taurus	40′	04^{h} 45.7^{m}	+19° 07′
NGC 1788	Cosmic Bat Nebula; Foxface Nebula	SD 19	Bright nebula	Orion	5′ × 3′	05^{h} 06.9^{m}	−03° 21′
NGC 1817	Poor Man's Double Cluster	SD 21	Open cluster	Taurus	20′	05^{h} 12.4^{m}	+16° 41′
NGC 1931	Fly Nebula	SD 23	Bright nebula / open cluster	Auriga	4′	05^{h} 31.4^{m}	+34° 15′
NGC 1999	13th Pearl Nebula; Rubber Stamp Nebula	HT 33	Bright nebula	Orion	2′ × 2′	05^{h} 36.5^{m}	−06° 42′
NGC 2024	Lips Nebula; Flame Nebula; Burning Bush Nebula; Tank Tracks Nebula; Ghost of Alnitak; One Piece Nebula	HT 34	Bright nebula	Orion	30′ × 30′	05^{h} 41.9^{m}	−01° 51′
NGC 2022	Kissing Crescents Nebula	AHT 6, SD 25	Planetary nebula	Orion	28′ × 27′	05^{h} 42.1^{m}	+09° 05′
NGC 2169	Shopping Cart Cluster; Little Pleiades; 37 Cluster	HT 36	Open cluster	Orion	6′	06^{h} 08.4^{m}	+13° 58′
NGC 2232		ASD 6	Open cluster	Monoceros	53′	06^{h} 27.2^{m}	−04° 45′
NGC 2264	Christmas Tree Cluster	HT 38	Open cluster	Monoceros	40′	06^{h} 41.0^{m}	+09° 54′
NGC 2281	Broken Heart Cluster	SD 30	Open cluster	Auriga	25′	06^{h} 48.3^{m}	+41° 05′
NGC 2301	Hagrid's Dragon	HT 39	Open cluster	Monoceros	15′	06^{h} 51.8^{m}	+00° 28′
NGC 2343	Double Mint Cluster	SD 33	Open cluster	Monoceros	6′	07^{h} 08.1^{m}	−10° 37′
NGC 2353	Avery's Island	HT 40	Open cluster	Monoceros	18′	07^{h} 14.5^{m}	−10° 16′
NGC 2371/2372	Double Bubble Nebula	SD 36	Planetary nebula	Gemini	58″	07^{h} 25.5^{m}	+29° 29′
NGC 2420	Twinkling Comet Cluster	SD 37	Open cluster	Gemini	6′	07^{h} 38.4^{m}	+21° 34′
NGC 2440	Albino Butterfly Nebula; Kiss Nebula; Little Lips Nebula	HT 41	Planetary nebula	Puppis	74′ × 42′	07^{h} 41.9^{m}	−18° 12′
NGC 2489		ASD 8	Open cluster	Puppis	5′	07^{h} 56.2^{m}	−30° 04′
NGC 2527		ASD 9	Open cluster	Puppis	10′	08^{h} 04.9^{m}	−28° 08′
NGC 2539	"The Dish" Cluster	HT 45	Open cluster	Puppis	15′	08^{h} 10.6^{m}	−12° 49′
NGC 2683	UFO Galaxy	HT 47	Galaxy	Lynx	9.1′ × 2.7′	08^{h} 52.7^{m}	+33° 25′
NGC 2655		HT 48	Galaxy	Camelopardalis	5.9′ × 5.3′	08^{h} 55.6^{m}	+78° 13′
NGC 2841	Tiger's Eye Galaxy	HT 49	Galaxy	Ursa Major	6.6′ × 3.4′	09^{h} 22.0^{m}	+50° 59′
NGC 2903 / NGC 2905		HT 51	Galaxy	Leo	11.6′ × 5.7′	09^{h} 32.2^{m}	+21° 30′
NGC 3079	Phantom Frisbee Galaxy	SD 38	Galaxy	Ursa Major	8.0′ × 1.5′	10^{h} 02.0^{m}	+55° 41′
NGC 3077		SD 39	Galaxy	Ursa Major	5.5′ × 4.1′	10^{h} 03.3^{m}	+68° 44′
NGC 3166		SD 40	Galaxy	Sextans	4.6′ × 2.6′	10^{h} 13.8^{m}	+03° 26′
NGC 3169		SD 41	Galaxy	Sextans	5.0′ × 2.8′	10^{h} 14.2^{m}	+03° 28′
NGC 3184	Little Pinwheel Galaxy	HT 52	Galaxy	Ursa Major	7.5′ × 7.0′	10^{h} 18.3^{m}	+41° 25′
NGC 3198		SD 42	Galaxy	Ursa Major	9.2′ × 3.5′	10^{h} 19.9^{m}	+45° 33′
NGC 3226		SD 43	Galaxy	Leo	2.5′ × 2.2′	10^{h} 23.4^{m}	+19° 54′
NGC 3227		SD 44	Galaxy	Leo	6.9′ × 5.4′	10^{h} 23.5^{m}	+19° 52′
NGC 3344	Sliced Onion Galaxy	HT 55	Galaxy	Leo Minor	6.7′ × 6.3′	10^{h} 43.5^{m}	+24° 55′
NGC 3432	Knitting Needle Galaxy	SD 45	Galaxy	Leo Minor	6.9′ × 1.9′	10^{h} 52.5^{m}	+36° 37′
NGC 3521		HT 56	Galaxy	Leo	11.7′ × 6.5′	11^{h} 05.8^{m}	−00° 02′
NGC 3607		ASD 11	Galaxy	Leo	4.6′ × 4.1′	11^{h} 16.9^{m}	+18° 03′
NGC 3608		ASD 12	Galaxy	Leo	2.7′ × 2.3′	11^{h} 17.0^{m}	+18° 09′
NGC 3621	Frame Galaxy; Southern Cross Galaxy	HT 57, SG 51	Galaxy	Hydra	9.8′ × 4.6′	11^{h} 18.3^{m}	−32° 49′
NGC 3628	King Hamlet's Ghost; Vanishing Galaxy	HT 58	Galaxy	Leo	14.8′ × 3.3′	11^{h} 20.3^{m}	+13° 35′
NGC 3640		ASD 13	Galaxy	Leo	4.6′ × 4.1′	11^{h} 21.1^{m}	+03° 14′
NGC 3675		SD 46	Galaxy	Ursa Major	6.2′ × 3.2′	11^{h} 26.1^{m}	+43° 35′
NGC 3893		SD 47	Galaxy	Ursa Major	4.2′ × 2.3′	11^{h} 48.6^{m}	+48° 43′
NGC 3938		ASD 14	Galaxy	Ursa Major	4.9′ × 4.7′	11^{h} 52.8^{m}	+44° 07′
NGC 3953 (Messier 109?)		SD 48	Galaxy	Ursa Major	6.0′ × 3.2′	11^{h} 53.8^{m}	+52° 20′
NGC 4036		SD 49	Galaxy	Ursa Major	3.8′ × 1.9′	12^{h} 01.4^{m}	+61° 54′
NGC 4051		SD 50	Galaxy	Ursa Major	5.5′ × 4.6′	12^{h} 03.2^{m}	+44° 32′
NGC 4111		SD 51	Galaxy	Canes Venatici	4.4′ × 0.9′	12^{h} 07.1^{m}	+43° 04′
NGC 4147	Kick the Can Cluster	SD 52	Globular cluster	Coma Berenices	4′	12^{h} 10.1^{m}	+18° 32.5′
NGC 4214		HT 59	Galaxy	Canes Venatici	9.6′ × 8.1′	12^{h} 15.6^{m}	+36° 20′
NGC 4216	Silver Streak Galaxy; Weaver's Shuttle Galaxy	HT 60	Galaxy	Virgo	7.9′ × 1.7′	12^{h} 15.9^{m}	+13° 09′
NGC 4293		SD 53	Galaxy	Coma Berenices	5.3′ × 3.1′	12^{h} 21.2^{m}	+18° 23′
NGC 4361		HT 61	Planetary nebula	Corvus	1.9′ × 1.9′	12^{h} 24.5^{m}	−18° 47′
NGC 4414		SD 54	Galaxy	Coma Berenices	4.4′ × 3.0′	12^{h} 26.4^{m}	+31° 13′
NGC 4435	The Eyes	SD 55	Galaxy	Virgo	3.2′ × 2.0′	12^{h} 27.7^{m}	+13° 05′
NGC 4438	The Eyes	SD 56	Galaxy	Virgo	8.9′ × 3.6′	12^{h} 27.8^{m}	+13° 01′
NGC 4450		SD 57	Galaxy	Coma Berenices	5.0′ × 3.4′	12^{h} 28.5^{m}	+17° 05′
NGC 4473		SD 60	Galaxy	Coma Berenices	3.7′ × 2.4′	12^{h} 29.8^{m}	+13° 26′
NGC 4477		SD 61	Galaxy	Coma Berenices	3.9′ × 3.6′	12^{h} 30.0^{m}	+13° 38′
NGC 4490	Cocoon Galaxy	HT 63	Galaxy	Canes Venatici	5.6′ × 2.8′	12^{h} 30.6^{m}	+41° 39′
NGC 4526	Hairy Eyebrow Galaxy	HT 65	Galaxy	Virgo	7.4′ × 2.7′	12^{h} 34.0^{m}	+07° 42′
NGC 4636		SD 62	Galaxy	Virgo	7.1′ × 5.2′	12^{h} 42.8^{m}	+02° 41′
NGC 4656	"Messier's" Hockey Stick; Hook Galaxy; Hummingbird Galaxy	HT 67	Galaxy	Canes Venatici	18.8′ × 3.2′	12^{h} 44.0^{m}	+32° 10′
NGC 4665		SD 63	Galaxy	Virgo	4.1′ × 4.1′	12^{h} 45.1^{m}	+03° 03′
NGC 4698		ASD 15	Galaxy	Virgo	3.2′ × 1.7′	12^{h} 48.4^{m}	+08° 29′
NGC 4699	Vinyl LP Galaxy	HT 68	Galaxy	Virgo	3.1′ × 2.5′	12^{h} 49.0^{m}	−08° 40′
NGC 4725		HT 69	Galaxy	Coma Berenices	10.5′ × 8.1′	12^{h} 50.4^{m}	+25° 30′
NGC 4753	Dust Devil Galaxy	SD 64	Galaxy	Virgo	4.1′ × 2.3′	12^{h} 52.4^{m}	−01° 12′
NGC 4762	Paper-Kite Galaxy	SD 65	Galaxy	Virgo	9.1′ × 2.2′	12^{h} 52.9^{m}	+11° 04′
NGC 5033	Waterbug Galaxy	SD 66	Galaxy	Canes Venatici	10.5′ × 5.1′	13^{h} 13.4^{m}	+36° 36′
NGC 5195	Messier 51b	SD 67	Galaxy	Canes Venatici	6.4′ × 4.6′	13^{h} 30.0^{m}	+47° 16′
NGC 5363		HT 72	Galaxy	Virgo	4.7′ × 3.2′	13^{h} 56.1^{m}	+05° 15′
NGC 5466	Snowglobe Cluster; Ghost Globular	SD 68	Globular cluster	Boötes	9′	14^{h} 05.4^{m}	+28° 32′
NGC 5634		ASD 17	Globular cluster	Virgo	5.5′	14^{h} 29.6^{m}	−05° 59′
NGC 5746	Blade & Pearl Galaxy	HT 74	Galaxy	Virgo	8.1′ × 1.4′	14^{h} 44.9^{m}	+01° 57′
NGC 5866	Fool's Gold Galaxy	HT 75	Galaxy	Draco	7.3′ × 3.5′	15^{h} 06.5^{m}	+55° 46′
NGC 5846		AHT 11, SD 69	Galaxy	Virgo	4.9′ × 4.4′	15^{h} 06.5^{m}	+01° 36′
NGC 5907	Splinter Galaxy; Knife-Edge Galaxy; Cat Scratch Galaxy	AHT 12, SD 70	Galaxy	Draco	11.2′ × 1.9′	15^{h} 15.9^{m}	+56° 20′
NGC 5897	Ghost Globular	HT 76	Globular cluster	Libra	11′	15^{h} 17.4^{m}	−21° 01′
NGC 6144		SD 72	Globular cluster	Scorpius	9′	16^{h} 27.2^{m}	−26° 01′
NGC 6207		SD 73	Galaxy	Hercules	3.0′ × 1.1′	16^{h} 43.1^{m}	+36° 50′
NGC 6229	"Prize Comet Cluster"	SD 74	Globular cluster	Hercules	4.5′	16^{h} 46.9^{m}	+47° 32′
NGC 6293		SD 75	Globular cluster	Ophiuchus	7.9′	17^{h} 10.2^{m}	−26° 35′
NGC 6316	Dunlop 629	SG 88	Globular cluster	Ophiuchus	5.4′	17^{h} 16.6^{m}	−28° 08′
NGC 6356		AHT 15, SD 77	Globular cluster	Ophiuchus	10′	17^{h} 23.6^{m}	−17° 49′
NGC 6369	Little Ghost Nebula; Ghost of Mars Nebula	HT 81	Planetary nebula	Ophiuchus	58′ × 34′	17^{h} 29.3^{m}	−23° 46′
NGC 6445	Box Nebula	HT 84	Planetary nebula	Sagittarius	3.1′ × 0.9′	17^{h} 49.2^{m}	−20° 01′
NGC 6520	Dead Man's Chest; Castaway Cluster	HT 88	Open cluster	Sagittarius	5′	18^{h} 03.4^{m}	−27° 54′
NGC 6522	Dunlop 1160 (unpublished notes)	SD 78, SG 99	Globular cluster	Sagittarius	9.4′	18^{h} 03.6^{m}	−30° 02′
NGC 6528		SD 79	Globular cluster	Sagittarius	3.7′	18^{h} 04.8^{m}	−30° 03′
NGC 6544	Starfish Cluster	HT 89	Globular cluster	Sagittarius	4.6′	18^{h} 07.3^{m}	−25° 00′
NGC 6569	Dunlop 619	SG 103	Globular cluster	Sagittarius	6.4′	18^{h} 13.6^{m}	−31° 50′
NGC 6624	Dunlop 1157 (unpublished notes)	HT 91, SG 105	Globular cluster	Sagittarius	8.8′	18^{h} 23.7^{m}	−30° 22′
NGC 6633	Tweedledum Cluster; Captain Hook Cluster; Wasp-Waist Cluster	HT 92	Open cluster	Ophiuchus	20′	18^{h} 27.2^{m}	+06° 30′
NGC 6638		SD 83	Globular cluster	Sagittarius	7.3′	18^{h} 30.9^{m}	−25° 30′
NGC 6664	Santa's Sleigh; Teacup Cluster	AHT 17, SD 84	Open cluster	Scutum	12′	18^{h} 36.5^{m}	−08° 11′
NGC 6712		HT 95	Globular cluster	Scutum	9.8′	18^{h} 53.1^{m}	−08° 42′
NGC 6755		SD 87	Open cluster	Aquila	15′	19^{h} 07.8^{m}	+04° 16′
NGC 6756		SD 88	Open cluster	Aquila	4′	19^{h} 08.7^{m}	+04° 42′
NGC 6781	Ghost of the Moon	AHT 18, SD 90	Planetary nebula	Aquila	1.9′ × 1.8′	19^{h} 18.5^{m}	+06° 32′
NGC 6818	Little Gem Nebula; Green Mars Nebula	HT 99	Planetary nebula	Sagittarius	22′ × 15′	19^{h} 44.0^{m}	−14° 09′
NGC 6866	Frigate Bird Cluster	HT 100	Open cluster	Cygnus	15′	20^{h} 03.9^{m}	+44° 09′
NGC 6905	Blue Flash Nebula; Caged Spirit Nebula	AHT 19, SD 98	Planetary nebula	Delphinus	42′ × 35′	20^{h} 22.4^{m}	+20° 06′
NGC 6910	Inchworm Cluster	SD 99	Open cluster	Cygnus	10′	20^{h} 23.2^{m}	+40° 47′
NGC 6939	Ghost Bush Cluster; Flying Geese Cluster; Silk Fan Cluster	AHT 20, SD 100	Open cluster	Cepheus	10′	20^{h} 31.5^{m}	+60° 40′
NGC 6940	Mothra Cluster	HT 101	Open cluster	Vulpecula	25′	20^{h} 34.5^{m}	+28° 17′
NGC 7008	Coat Button Nebula; Fetus Nebula	HT 103	Planetary nebula	Cygnus	98′ × 75′	21^{h} 00.5^{m}	+54° 33′
NGC 7160	Bruce Lee Cluster; Swimming Alligator Cluster	SD 104	Open cluster	Cepheus	5′	21^{h} 53.7^{m}	+62° 36′
NGC 7209	Star Lizard Cluster	SD 105	Open cluster	Lacerta	15′	22^{h} 05.8^{m}	+46° 29′
NGC 7380	Wizard Nebula; Harry Potter and the Golden Snitch Nebula	HT 106	Open cluster	Cepheus	20′	22^{h} 47.3^{m}	+58° 08′
NGC 7510	Dormouse Cluster	SD 107	Open cluster	Cepheus	7′	23^{h} 11.1^{m}	+60° 34′
NGC 7789	Caroline's Rose; Herschel's Spiral Cluster; Crab Cluster; Screaming Skull Cluster	HT 108	Open cluster	Cassiopeia	25′	23^{h} 57.5^{m}	+56° 43′
NGC 7790	Widow's Web Cluster	SD 109	Open cluster	Cassiopeia	5′	23^{h} 58.4^{m}	+61° 12.5′

== Unique objects ==
There are 203 objects that are found only O'Meara's original catalogues, but are not included in the Messier, Caldwell, and Herschel 400 catalogues (O'Meara has written separate books that fully cover each of these three catalogues):

Unique objects in O'Meara's catalogues
Designation	Other names (or Dunlop catalogue no.)	O'Meara catalogue no.	Object type	Constellation	Apparent dimensions	Right ascension (J2000)	Declination (J2000)
van den Bergh 1		SD 1	Bright nebula	Cassiopeia	5′ × 5′	00^{h} 11.0^{m}	+58° 46′
NGC 134	Giant Squid Galaxy	AHT 1, SD 2, SG 3	Galaxy	Sculptor	7.6′ × 1.5′	00^{h} 30.4^{m}	−33° 15′
NGC 189		HT 1	Open cluster	Cassiopeia	5′	00^{h} 39.6^{m}	+61° 06′
NGC 261	Dunlop 21	ASG 1	Bright nebula	Tucana (Small Magellanic Cloud)	1.3′	00^{h} 46.55^{m}	−73° 07′
NGC 281	Pacman Nebula; Lafitte's Grand Isle Nebula	HT 3	Bright nebula	Cassiopeia	35′ × 30′	00^{h} 52.8^{m}	+56° 37′
NGC 330	Dunlop 23	ASG 2	Open cluster	Tucana (Small Magellanic Cloud)	1.4′	00^{h} 56.2^{m}	−72° 28′
NGC 346	Dunlop 25	ASG 3	Bright nebula	Tucana (Small Magellanic Cloud)	14′ × 11′	00^{h} 59.1^{m}	−72° 11′
NGC 371	Dunlop 31	ASG 4	Bright nebula	Tucana (Small Magellanic Cloud)	7.5′	01^{h} 03.3^{m}	−72° 05′
IC 1633	Dunlop 437	ASG 5	Galaxy	Phoenix	2.6′	01^{h} 09.9^{m}	−45° 55′
NGC 456	Dunlop 7	ASG 6	Bright nebula	Tucana (Small Magellanic Cloud)	15′	01^{h} 13.7^{m}	−73° 17′
NGC 602	Dunlop 17	ASG 7	Bright nebula	Tucana (Small Magellanic Cloud)	3.4′	01^{h} 29.6^{m}	−73° 33′
NGC 625	Dunlop 479	SG 7	Galaxy	Phoenix	6.5′ × 2.1′	01^{h} 35.1^{m}	−41° 26′
Collinder 463	Loch Ness Monster Cluster; The Queen's Reflection	SD 5	Open cluster	Cassiopeia	57′	01^{h} 45.7^{m}	+71° 49′
IC 1747	Holepunch Nebula	ASD 3	Planetary nebula	Cassiopeia	13″	01^{h} 57.6^{m}	+63° 20′
Stock 2	9 (Stitchpunks)	SD 6	Open cluster	Cassiopeia	60′	02^{h} 14.7^{m}	+59° 29′
NGC 986	Dunlop 519	SG 8	Galaxy	Fornax	3.8′ × 1.9′	02^{h} 33.6^{m}	−39° 02′
NGC 1232	Eye of God	HT 11	Galaxy	Eridanus	7.2′ × 5.7′	03^{h} 09.8^{m}	−20° 35′
NGC 1291	Snow Collar Galaxy	HT 12, SG 11	Galaxy	Eridanus	11.1′ × 10.1′	03^{h} 17.3^{m}	−41° 06′
NGC 1313	Dunlop 206	SG 12	Galaxy	Reticulum	11.0′ × 7.6′	03^{h} 18.3^{m}	−66° 30′
NGC 1300		AHT 3, SD 10	Galaxy	Eridanus	5.5′ × 2.9′	03^{h} 19.7^{m}	−19° 25′
NGC 1316	Fornax A	HT 13, SG 13	Galaxy	Fornax	13.5′ × 9.3′	03^{h} 22.7^{m}	−37° 12′
NGC 1317	Dunlop 547	SG 14	Galaxy	Fornax	3.5′ × 3.0′	03^{h} 22.8^{m}	−37° 06′
Melotte 20	Alpha Persei Moving Cluster; Little Cloud of Pirates	HT 14	Open cluster	Perseus	300′	03^{h} 24.3^{m}	+49° 52′
NGC 1333	Embryo Nebula; Phantom Tiara Nebula	HT 15	Bright nebula	Perseus	6′ × 3′	03^{h} 29.3^{m}	+31° 25′
NGC 1350	The Colossal Cosmic Eye; Dunlop 591	SG 15	Galaxy	Fornax	6.2′ × 3.2′	03^{h} 31.1^{m}	−33° 38′
NGC 1360	Comet Planetary Nebula	HT 16	Planetary nebula	Fornax	9′ × 5′	03^{h} 33.2^{m}	−25° 52′
NGC 1365	Dunlop 562	HT 17, SG 16	Galaxy	Fornax	11.2′ × 5.9′	03^{h} 33.6^{m}	−36° 08′
NGC 1380	Dunlop 574	SG 17	Galaxy	Fornax	4.8′ × 2.8′	03^{h} 36.5^{m}	−34° 59′
NGC 1399		HT 18	Galaxy	Fornax	8.1′ × 7.6′	03^{h} 38.5^{m}	−35° 27′
NGC 1398		HT 19	Galaxy	Fornax	7.6′ × 5.3′	03^{h} 38.9^{m}	−26° 20′
NGC 1404		HT 20	Galaxy	Fornax	4.8′ × 3.9′	03^{h} 38.9^{m}	−35° 36′
NGC 1400		SD 12	Galaxy	Eridanus	2.8′ × 2.5′	03^{h} 39.5^{m}	−18° 41′
NGC 1433	Dunlop 426	SG 18	Galaxy	Horologium	5.5′ × 3.2′	03^{h} 42.0^{m}	−47° 13′
NGC 1487	Dunlop 480	ASG 8	Galaxy	Eridanus	2.2′ × 20′	03^{h} 55.8^{m}	−42° 22′
Kemble 1	Kemble's Cascade; Kidd's Creek	HT 21	Asterism	Camelopardalis	180′	03^{h} 57.4^{m}	+63° 04′
NGC 1499	California Nebula	ASD 4	Bright nebula	Perseus	160′ × 40′	04^{h} 00.7^{m}	+36° 37′
NGC 1491	Fossil Footprint	AHT 4, SD 14	Bright nebula	Perseus	25′ × 25′	04^{h} 03.4^{m}	+51° 19′
NGC 1512	Dunlop 466	SG 19	Galaxy	Horologium	8.3′ × 3.6′	04^{h} 03.9^{m}	−43° 21′
NGC 1515	Dunlop 348	ASG 9	Galaxy	Dorado	5.5′ × 1.4′	04^{h} 04.1^{m}	−54° 06′
NGC 1527	Dunlop 409	SG 20	Galaxy	Horologium	4.2′ × 1.8′	04^{h} 08.4^{m}	−47° 53′
NGC 1514	Crystal Ball Nebula	AHT 5, SD 15	Planetary nebula	Taurus	2.3′ × 2.0′	04^{h} 09^{m}	+30° 47′
NGC 1533	Dunlop 320	ASG 10	Galaxy	Dorado	3.0′ × 2.8′	04^{h} 09.9^{m}	−56° 07′
NGC 1532	Dunlop 600	SG 21	Galaxy	Eridanus	11.2′ × 3.2′	04^{h} 12.1^{m}	−32° 52′
NGC 1543	Dunlop 306	SG 22	Galaxy	Reticulum	7.2′ × 4.9′	04^{h} 12.8^{m}	−57° 44′
NGC 1553	Dunlop 331	SG 23	Galaxy	Dorado	6.3′ × 4.4′	04^{h} 16.2^{m}	−55° 47′
NGC 1559	Dunlop 264	SG 24	Galaxy	Reticulum	4.3′ × 2.2′	04^{h} 17.6^{m}	−62° 47′
NGC 1566	Dunlop 338	SG 25	Galaxy	Dorado	7.1′ × 4.8′	04^{h} 20.0^{m}	−54° 56′
NGC 1579	Northern Trifid Nebula	SD 16	Bright nebula	Perseus	12′ × 8′	04^{h} 30.2^{m}	+35° 16′
NGC 1617	Dunlop 339	SG 26	Galaxy	Dorado	4.8′ × 2.2′	04^{h} 31.7^{m}	−54° 36′
NGC 1672	Dunlop 296	SG 27	Galaxy	Dorado	6.2′ × 3.4′	04^{h} 45.7^{m}	−59° 15′
NGC 1763	Dunlop 230	ASG 11	Bright nebula	Dorado (Large Magellanic Cloud)	5′ × 3′	04^{h} 56.8^{m}	−66° 24′
NGC 1770	Dunlop 169	ASG 12	Bright nebula	Dorado (Large Magellanic Cloud)	3′ × 2′	04^{h} 57.2^{m}	−68° 25′
NGC 1750 (= NGC 1746)		SD 17	Open cluster	Taurus	30′	05^{h} 04.3^{m}	+23° 44′
NGC 1758		SD 18	Open cluster	Taurus	10′	05^{h} 04.7^{m}	+23° 48′
NGC 1792	Dunlop 531	SG 28	Galaxy	Columba	5.5′ × 2.5′	05^{h} 05.2^{m}	−37° 59′
NGC 1808	Dunlop 549	SG 29	Galaxy	Columba	5.2′ × 2.3′	05^{h} 07.7^{m}	−37° 31′
NGC 1850	Dunlop 172	ASG 13	Open cluster	Dorado (Large Magellanic Cloud)	3.4′	05^{h} 08.5^{m}	−68° 46′
NGC 1807	Poor Man's Double Cluster	SD 20	Open cluster	Taurus	12′	05^{h} 10.8^{m}	+16° 31′
NGC 1876	Dunlop 122	ASG 14	Bright nebula	Dorado (Large Magellanic Cloud)	1.5′	05^{h} 13.3^{m}	−69° 22′
NGC 1910	Dunlop 129	ASG 15	Stellar association	Dorado (Large Magellanic Cloud)	8.5′	05^{h} 18.1^{m}	−69° 13′
NGC 1935	Dunlop 175	ASG 16	Bright nebula	Dorado (Large Magellanic Cloud)	1.2′	05^{h} 22.0^{m}	−67° 57′
NGC 1965	Dunlop 136	ASG 17	Bright nebula	Dorado (Large Magellanic Cloud)	1.2′	05^{h} 26.6^{m}	−68° 48′
NGC 1947	Dunlop 421 (unpublished notes)	SG 31	Galaxy	Dorado	3.6′ × 3.2′	05^{h} 26.8^{m}	−63° 46′
NGC 1968	Dunlop 188	ASG 18	Bright nebula	Dorado (Large Magellanic Cloud)	1.2′	05^{h} 27.4^{m}	−67° 28′
IC 418	Spirograph Nebula; Raspberry Nebula; Colored Contacts Nebula	HT 28	Planetary nebula	Lepus	14′ × 11′	05^{h} 27.5^{m}	−12° 42′
IC 417 / Stock 8	Spider Nebula	SD 22	Bright nebula / open cluster	Auriga	13′ × 10′	05^{h} 28.1^{m}	+34° 26′
NGC 2004	Dunlop 216	ASG 19	Open cluster	Dorado (Large Magellanic Cloud)	2.7′	05^{h} 30.6^{m}	−67° 17′
Collinder 69	Lambda Orionis Cluster; Aunt Margaret's Mirror	HT 29	Open cluster	Orion	70′	05^{h} 35.0^{m}	+09° 56′
NGC 1981	Coal Car Cluster	HT 30	Open cluster	Orion	28′	05^{h} 35.2^{m}	−04° 26′
NGC 2032	Dunlop 219	ASG 20	Bright nebula	Dorado (Large Magellanic Cloud)	2.8′	05^{h} 35.3^{m}	−67° 34′
Collinder 72	Lost Jewel of Orion	HT 31	Open cluster	Orion	15′	05^{h} 35.4^{m}	−05° 55′
NGC 1977	Mermaid's Purse Nebula; Running Man Nebula	HT 32	Bright nebula	Orion	20′ × 10′	05^{h} 35.5^{m}	−04° 52′
Collinder 70	Orion's Belt; Serpentine Column	SD 24	Open cluster	Orion	140′	05^{h} 35.6^{m}	−01° 05′
NGC 2058	Dunlop 103	ASG 21	Open cluster	Dorado (Large Magellanic Cloud)	1.8′	05^{h} 36.9^{m}	−70° 10′
NGC 2080	Dunlop 150	ASG 23	Bright nebula	Dorado (Large Magellanic Cloud)	15′	05^{h} 39.7^{m}	−69° 39′
NGC 2090	Dunlop 594	SG 32	Galaxy	Columba	4.5′ × 2.3′	05^{h} 47.0^{m}	−34° 14′
Sharpless 2-276		SD 26	Supernova remnant	Orion	90′ × 30′	05^{h} 52.5^{m}	+00° 45′
IC 2149		SD 27	Planetary nebula	Auriga	8.5′	05^{h} 56.4^{m}	+46° 06′
NGC 2164	Dunlop 196	ASG 24	Open cluster	Dorado (Large Magellanic Cloud)	2.5′	05^{h} 58.9^{m}	−68° 31′
NGC 2149		SD 28	Bright nebula	Monoceros	3′ × 2′	06^{h} 03.5^{m}	−09° 44′
NGC 2170		SD 29	Bright nebula	Monoceros	2′ × 2′	06^{h} 07.5^{m}	−06° 24′
NGC 2163 (Cederblad 62)		HT 35	Bright nebula	Orion	3′ × 2′	06^{h} 07.8^{m}	+18° 39′
NGC 2175		HT 37	Bright nebula	Orion	40′ × 30′	06^{h} 09.7^{m}	+20° 30′
IC 2165		ASD 5	Planetary nebula	Canis Major	4″	06^{h} 21.7^{m}	−12° 59′
NGC 2298	Dunlop 578	SD 31, SG 33	Globular cluster	Puppis	5′	06^{h} 49.0^{m}	−36° 00′
NGC 2316		SD 32	Bright nebula	Monoceros	4′ × 3′	06^{h} 59.7^{m}	−07° 46′
NGC 2346	Crimson Butterfly Nebula	SD 34	Planetary nebula	Monoceros	> 50″	07^{h} 09.4^{m}	−00° 48′
NGC 2359	Flying Eye Nebula; Thor's Helmet; Duck Head Nebula	SD 35	Bright nebula	Canis Major	9′ × 6′	07^{h} 18.6^{m}	−13° 12′
NGC 2439		ASD 7	Open cluster	Puppis	9′	07^{h} 40.8^{m}	−31° 41.5′
NGC 2451	Stinging Scorpion	HT 42	Asterism	Puppis	50′	07^{h} 45.4^{m}	−37° 57′
NGC 2467		HT 43	Bright nebula	Puppis	16′ × 12′	07^{h} 52.5^{m}	−26° 24′
NGC 2547	Golden Earring Cluster; St. Peter's Cross; Malus Cluster	HT 44, SG 36	Open cluster	Vela	25′	08^{h} 10.2^{m}	−49° 13′
NGC 2546	Heart & Dagger Cluster; "Wounded Heart" Cluster	HT 46, SG 37	Open cluster	Puppis	70′	08^{h} 12.4^{m}	−37° 37′
Markarian 18	Dunlop 430	ASG 25	Open cluster	Vela	2′	09^{h} 00.6^{m}	−48° 59′
NGC 2808	Dunlop 265	SG 38	Globular cluster	Carina	14′	09^{h} 12.0^{m}	−64° 52′
NGC 2818	Dunlop 564	SG 39	Planetary nebula	Pyxis	38″	09^{h} 16.1^{m}	−36° 38′
Melotte 96	Dunlop 564	SG 40	Open cluster	Pyxis	8′	09^{h} 16.2^{m}	−36° 37′
IC 2488	Strings of Pearls Cluster; Hoopskirt Cluster	HT 50	Open cluster	Vela	18′	09^{h} 27.4^{m}	−56° 57′
NGC 2997	Dunlop 622	SG 41	Galaxy	Antlia	10.0′ × 6.3′	09^{h} 45.6^{m}	−31° 11′
NGC 3114	Dunlop 297	AHT 7, SG 42	Open cluster	Carina	35′	10^{h} 02.7^{m}	−60° 06′
UGC 5470	Leo I Dwarf	ASD 10	Galaxy	Leo	12.0′ × 9.3′	10^{h} 08.4^{m}	+12° 18′
NGC 3199	Dunlop 332	SG 44	Bright nebula	Carina	20′ × 15′	10^{h} 16.8^{m}	−57° 57′
NGC 3228	Queen's Cache cluster	HT 53	Open cluster	Vela	5′	10^{h} 21.4^{m}	−51° 43′
NGC 3293	Spider Spit Cluster; Little Jewel Box; Dunlop 321	HT 54, SG 46	Open cluster	Carina	5′	10^{h} 35.8^{m}	−58° 13′
NGC 3324	Dunlop 322	ASG 26	Bright nebula	Carina	16′ × 4′	10^{h} 37.7^{m}	−58° 40′
Melotte 101	Dunlop 258	ASG 27	Open cluster	Carina	13′	10^{h} 42.1^{m}	−65° 06′
IC 2714	Rip-Torn Cluster; Dunlop 281	SG 50	Open cluster	Carina	15′	11^{h} 17.3^{m}	−62° 43′
Melotte 105	Dunlop 271	SG 52	Open cluster	Carina	5′	11^{h} 20.3^{m}	−63° 29′
NGC 3680	Dunlop 481	ASG 28	Open cluster	Centaurus	7′	11^{h} 25.6^{m}	−43° 15′
NGC 3918	Blue Planetary; The Southerner; Dunlop (unpublished notes)	AHT 8, SG 54	Planetary nebula	Centaurus	12′	11^{h} 50.3^{m}	−57° 11′
NGC 4103	The Longtail; Dunlop 291	SG 55	Open cluster	Crux	6′	12^{h} 06.7^{m}	−61° 15′
Melotte 111	Coma Berenices Cluster; Berenice's Hair; Ariadne's Hair; Thisbe's Veil; Cobweb Cluster; Black Bart's Hair; Flying Witch Cluster	HT 62	Open cluster	Coma Berenices	300′	12^{h} 25.1^{m}	+26° 07′
NGC 4461		SD 58	Galaxy	Virgo	3.7′ × 1.4′	12^{h} 29.0^{m}	+13° 11′
3C 273		SD 59	Quasar	Virgo	—	12^{h} 29.1^{m}	+02° 03′
IC 3568	Theoretician's Nebula; Sliced Lime Nebula	HT 64	Planetary nebula	Camelopardalis	18′ × 18′	12^{h} 33.1^{m}	+82° 34′
Harvard 6	Dunlop 224	ASG 29	Open cluster	Musca	5′	12^{h} 37.9^{m}	−68° 28′
NGC 4605	Fabergé Egg Galaxy; Frankenstein Galaxy	HT 66	Galaxy	Ursa Major	5.7′ × 2.5′	12^{h} 40.0^{m}	+61° 36′
NGC 4696	Dunlop 510	SG 57	Galaxy	Centaurus	5.4′ × 3.9′	12^{h} 48.8^{m}	−41° 19′
NGC 4709	Dunlop 510	ASG 30	Galaxy	Centaurus	2.8′ × 2.4′	12^{h} 50.1^{m}	−41° 23′
NGC 5084		ASD 16	Galaxy	Virgo	11.0′ × 2.5′	13^{h} 20.3^{m}	−21° 50′
NGC 5102	Iota's Ghost	HT 70	Galaxy	Centaurus	8.3′ × 3.5′	13^{h} 22.0^{m}	−36° 38′
NGC 5189	Spiral Planetary; Dunlop 252	SG 63	Planetary nebula	Musca	153″ × 10.3″	13^{h} 33.5^{m}	−65° 59′
NGC 5253	Dunlop 623	SG 65	Galaxy	Centaurus	5.1′ × 2.3′	13^{h} 39.9^{m}	−31° 39′
NGC 5281	Little Scorpion Cluster; Dunlop 273	HT 71, SG 67	Open cluster	Centaurus	8′	13^{h} 46.6^{m}	−62° 55′
NGC 5460	Dunlop 431	SG 68	Open cluster	Centaurus	35′	14^{h} 07.6^{m}	−48° 18′
IC 4406	Retina Nebula	AHT 9	Planetary nebula	Lupus	1.7′ × 0.6′	14^{h} 22.4^{m}	−44° 09′
NGC 5617	Dracula Cluster; Dunlop 302	AHT 10, SG 69	Open cluster	Centaurus	10′	14^{h} 29.7^{m}	−60° 42′
NGC 5643	Dunlop 469	SG 70	Galaxy	Lupus	5.1′ × 4.3′	14^{h} 32.7^{m}	−44° 10′
NGC 5662	Gypsy Moth Cluster	HT 73	Open cluster	Centaurus	30′	14^{h} 35.5^{m}	−56° 40′
NGC 5824	Dunlop 611	ASD 18, SG 71	Globular cluster	Lupus	6′	15^{h} 04.0^{m}	−33° 04′
NGC 5882	Ghost of Uranus; Dunlop 447	SG 72	Planetary nebula	Lupus	7″	15^{h} 16.8^{m}	−45° 39′
NGC 5927	Dunlop 389	AHT 13, SG 73	Globular cluster	Lupus	6′	15^{h} 28.0^{m}	−50° 40′
NGC 5946	Dunlop 389 (unpublished notes)	SG 74	Globular cluster	Norma	3′	15^{h} 35.5^{m}	−50° 40′
NGC 5986	Dunlop 552	HT 77, SG 75	Globular cluster	Lupus	9.6′	15^{h} 46.1^{m}	−37° 47′
Trumpler 23	Dunlop 358	ASG 31	Open cluster	Norma	5′	16^{h} 00.5^{m}	−53° 31′
IC 4593	White-Eyed Pea Nebula	SD 71	Planetary nebula	Hercules	> 12″	16^{h} 11.7^{m}	+12° 04′
NGC 6067	Dunlop 360	SG 77	Open cluster	Norma	15′	16^{h} 13.1^{m}	−54° 13′
IC 4603		AHT 14, ASD 19	Bright nebula	Ophiuchus	35′ × 20′	16^{h} 25.6^{m}	−24° 28′
NGC 6139	Dunlop 536	SG 81	Globular cluster	Scorpius	8.2′	16^{h} 27.7^{m}	−38° 51′
NGC 6134	Little Pincushion; Dunlop 412	SG 82	Open cluster	Norma	8′	16^{h} 27.8^{m}	−49° 10′
Collinder 307	Dunlop 391	ASG 32	Open cluster	Ara	5′	16^{h} 35.2^{m}	−50° 58′
NGC 6192	Dunlop 483	SG 83	Open cluster	Scorpius	9′	16^{h} 40.3^{m}	−43° 22′
NGC 6210	Turtle Nebula	HT 78	Planetary nebula	Hercules	48′ × 8′	16^{h} 44.5^{m}	+23° 48′
NGC 6242	Dunlop 520	HT 79, SG 86	Open cluster	Scorpius	9′	16^{h} 55.5^{m}	−39° 28′
NGC 6268	Dunlop 521	ASG 34	Open cluster	Scorpius	6′	17^{h} 02.4^{m}	−39° 44′
NGC 6281	Moth Wing Cluster	HT 80, SG 87	Open cluster	Scorpius	8′	17^{h} 04.8^{m}	−37° 53′
NGC 6309	Box Nebula; Exclamation Mark	SD 76	Planetary nebula	Ophiuchus	> 16″	17^{h} 14.1^{m}	−12° 55′
NGC 6300	Dunlop (handwritten notes on microfiche)	ASG 35	Galaxy	Ara	5.2′ × 3.3′	17^{h} 17.0^{m}	−62° 49′
IC 4651	Dunlop 402	SG 89	Open cluster	Ara	10′	17^{h} 24.7^{m}	−49° 55′
NGC 6362	Dunlop 225	SG 91	Globular cluster	Ara	15′	17^{h} 31.9^{m}	−67° 03′
NGC 6388	Dunlop 457	AHT 16, SG 92	Globular cluster	Scorpius	10.4′	17^{h} 36.3^{m}	−44° 44′
NGC 6400	Phantom Cluster; Long John Silver Cluster	HT 82, SG 93	Open cluster	Scorpius	12′	17^{h} 40.2^{m}	−36° 58′
IC 4665	Summer Beehive Cluster; Black Swallowtail Butterfly Cluster	HT 83	Open cluster	Ophiuchus	70′	17^{h} 46.2^{m}	+05° 43′
NGC 6503	Lost-In-Space Galaxy	HT 85	Galaxy	Draco	5.9′ × 2.2′	17^{h} 49.4^{m}	+70° 09′
NGC 6441	Silver Nugget Cluster	HT 86, SG 96	Globular cluster	Scorpius	9.6′	17^{h} 50.2^{m}	−37° 03′
Barnard 283	Dunlop 605	SG 97	Dark nebula	Scorpius	90′ × 60′	17^{h} 51.3^{m}	−33° 53′
V2500 Ophiuchi	Barnard's Star; Barnard's Runaway Star; Gilpin; O-bah-bahm-wawa-ge-zhe-go-qua	HT 87	High-proper-motion star	Ophiuchus	—	17^{h} 57.8^{m}	+04° 40′
NGC 6496	Dunlop 460	SG 98	Globular cluster	Scorpius	5.6′	17^{h} 59.0^{m}	−44° 16′
NGC 6572	Emerald Eye Nebula; Planet Krypton Nebula	HT 90	Planetary nebula	Ophiuchus	16′ × 13′	18^{h} 12.1^{m}	+06° 51′
NGC 6563	Southern Ring Nebula	SD 80, SG 102	Planetary nebula	Sagittarius	50″ × 38″	18^{h} 12.1^{m}	−33° 52′
NGC 6589		SD 81	Bright nebula	Sagittarius	5′ × 3′	18^{h} 16.9^{m}	−19° 47′
NGC 6595 (= NGC 6590)		SD 82	Bright nebula	Sagittarius	4′ × 3′	18^{h} 17.1^{m}	−19° 52′
NGC 6603		ASD 20	Open cluster	Sagittarius	4′	18^{h} 18.5^{m}	−18° 24′
NGC 6584	Dunlop 376	SG 104	Globular cluster	Telescopium	6.6′	18^{h} 18.6^{m}	−52° 13′
NGC 6652	Dunlop 607	SG 107	Globular cluster	Sagittarius	6.0′	18^{h} 35.8^{m}	−32° 59′
IC 4756	Tweedledee Cluster; Secret Garden Cluster	HT 93	Open cluster	Serpens	40′	18^{h} 38.9^{m}	+05° 26′
NGC 6709	Flying Unicorn Cluster	HT 94	Open cluster	Aquila	15′	18^{h} 51.5^{m}	+10° 20′
IC 1295		ASD 21	Planetary nebula	Scutum	> 86″	18^{h} 54.6^{m}	−08° 50′
NGC 6717 (Palomar 9)		SD 85	Globular cluster	Sagittarius	5.4′	18^{h} 55.1^{m}	−22° 42′
NGC 6723	Dunlop 573	HT 96, SG 110	Globular cluster	Sagittarius	13.0′	18^{h} 59.5^{m}	−36° 38′
Bernes 157	Dunlop 559	SG 111	Dark nebula	Corona Australis	57′	19^{h} 02.9^{m}	−37° 08′
NGC 6751	Glowing Eye Nebula; Dandelion Puff Ball Nebula	SD 86	Planetary nebula	Aquila	24″	19^{h} 05.9^{m}	−05° 59.5′
NGC 6778	Son of M76	SD 89	Planetary nebula	Aquila	20″ × 40″	19^{h} 18.4^{m}	−01° 36′
Collinder 399	Coathanger; Al-Sufi's "Nebula"; Brocchi's "Cluster"; The Snail	HT 97	Asterism	Vulpecula	90′	19^{h} 26.2^{m}	+20° 06′
NGC 6804	Incredible Shrinking Nebula; Snowball Nebula	SD 91	Planetary nebula	Aquila	~50″	19^{h} 31.6^{m}	+09° 13′
NGC 6811	Smoke Ring Cluster; Hole in a Cluster; Reliquary Cluster	SD 92	Open cluster	Cygnus	15′	19^{h} 37.2^{m}	+46° 22.5′
NGC 6819	Fox Head Cluster; Octopus Cluster	HT 98	Open cluster	Cygnus	5′	19^{h} 41.3^{m}	+40° 11′
Cygnus X-1 (HDE 226868)		SD 93	Black hole (with companion star)	Cygnus	—	19^{h} 58.4^{m}	+35° 12′
O'Meara 3 (Alessi J20053+4732)		SD 94	Asterism	Cygnus	12′	20^{h} 05.3^{m}	+47° 32′
NGC 6861	Dunlop 425	ASG 37	Galaxy	Telescopium	2.9′ × 1.9′	20^{h} 07.3^{m}	−48° 22′
NGC 6891		SD 95	Planetary nebula	Delphinus	> 18″	20^{h} 15.2^{m}	+12° 42′
NGC 6894	Diamond Ring Nebula	SD 96	Planetary nebula	Cygnus	> 42″	20^{h} 16.4^{m}	+30° 34′
IC 1318		SD 97	Bright nebula	Cygnus	45′ × 20′	20^{h} 16.6^{m}	+41° 49′
NGC 6902	Dunlop 451	ASG 38	Galaxy	Sagittarius	4.1′ × 2.9′	20^{h} 24.5^{m}	−43° 39′
—	Northern Coalsack	HT 102	Dark nebula	Cygnus	480′ × 300′	20^{h} 40.0^{m}	+41° 00′
NGC 7026	Cheeseburger Nebula; Burnham's Nebula	SD 101	Planetary nebula	Cygnus	21″	21^{h} 06.3^{m}	+47° 51′
NGC 7027	Pink Pillow Nebula; Sugar Pops Nebula; Green Rectangle Nebula	HT 104	Planetary nebula	Cygnus	18′ × 10′	21^{h} 07.0^{m}	+42° 14′
NGC 7048	Peek-a-Boo Nebula	SD 102	Planetary nebula	Cygnus	61″	21^{h} 14.2^{m}	+46° 17′
NGC 7049	Dunlop 406	ASG 39	Galaxy	Indus	4.3′ × 3.2′	21^{h} 19.0^{m}	−48° 34′
NGC 7083	Dunlop 263	ASG 40	Galaxy	Indus	3.6′ × 2.1′	21^{h} 35.7^{m}	−63° 54′
Trumpler 37 (IC 1396 (nebula))	Misty Clover Cluster	HT 105	Open cluster	Cepheus	90′	21^{h} 39.0^{m}	+57° 30′
NGC 7129	Cosmic Rosebud Nebula	SD 103	Bright nebula	Cepheus	7′ × 7′	21^{h} 42.8^{m}	+66° 06′
NGC 7354		SD 106	Planetary nebula	Cepheus	22″ × 18″	22^{h} 40.3^{m}	+61° 17′
IC 5250	Dunlop 255	ASG 41	Galaxy	Tucana	3.1′	22^{h} 47.3^{m}	−65° 03′
NGC 7410	Dunlop 518	SG 115	Galaxy	Grus	5.8′ × 1.7′	22^{h} 55.0^{m}	−39° 40′
NGC 7538	Northern Lagoon Nebula; Brain Nebula	SD 108	Bright nebula	Cepheus	90′ × 60′	23^{h} 13.5^{m}	+61° 31′
NGC 7552	Dunlop 475	SG 116	Galaxy	Grus	3.8′ × 2.2′	23^{h} 16.2^{m}	−42° 35′
NGC 7582	Dunlop 476	SG 117	Galaxy	Grus	6.9′ × 2.6′	23^{h} 18.4^{m}	−42° 22′
NGC 7590	Dunlop 477 (1)	SG 118	Galaxy	Grus	2.9′ × 1.2′	23^{h} 18.9^{m}	−42° 14′
NGC 7599	Dunlop 477 (2)	SG 119	Galaxy	Grus	4.7′ × 1.5′	23^{h} 19.3^{m}	−42° 15′
IC 5332	Dunlop 546	ASG 42	Galaxy	Sculptor	6.0′ × 5.8′	23^{h} 34.5^{m}	−36° 06′
O'Meara 1 (Alessi J23407+0757)	Little Ladle	HT 107	Asterism	Pisces	15′	23^{h} 40.7^{m}	+07° 57′
NGC 7793	Bond's Galaxy	HT 109, SG 120	Galaxy	Sculptor	9.2′ × 6.4′	23^{h} 57.8^{m}	−32° 35′

== See also ==
- Messier object
- Caldwell catalogue
- Herschel 400 Catalogue
- Bennett Catalogue
- List of astronomical catalogues

== Bibliography ==
- O'Meara, Stephen James (1998). Deep-Sky Companions: The Messier Objects. Cambridge University Press.
- O'Meara, Stephen James (2002). Deep-Sky Companions: The Caldwell Objects. Cambridge University Press. ISBN 978-0-521-82796-6.
- O'Meara, Stephen James (2007). Deep-Sky Companions: Hidden Treasures. Cambridge University Press. ISBN 978-0-521-83704-0.
- O'Meara, Stephen James (2011). Deep-Sky Companions: The Secret Deep. Cambridge University Press. ISBN 978-0-521-19876-9.
- O'Meara, Stephen James (2013). Deep-Sky Companions: Southern Gems. Cambridge University Press. ISBN 978-1-107-01501-2.
- O'Meara, Stephen James (2014). Deep-Sky Companions: The Messier Objects (2nd ed.). Cambridge University Press. ISBN 978-1-107-01837-2.
