= NGC 7354 =

Planetary nebula in the constellation Cepheus

Emission nebula
- Planetary nebula
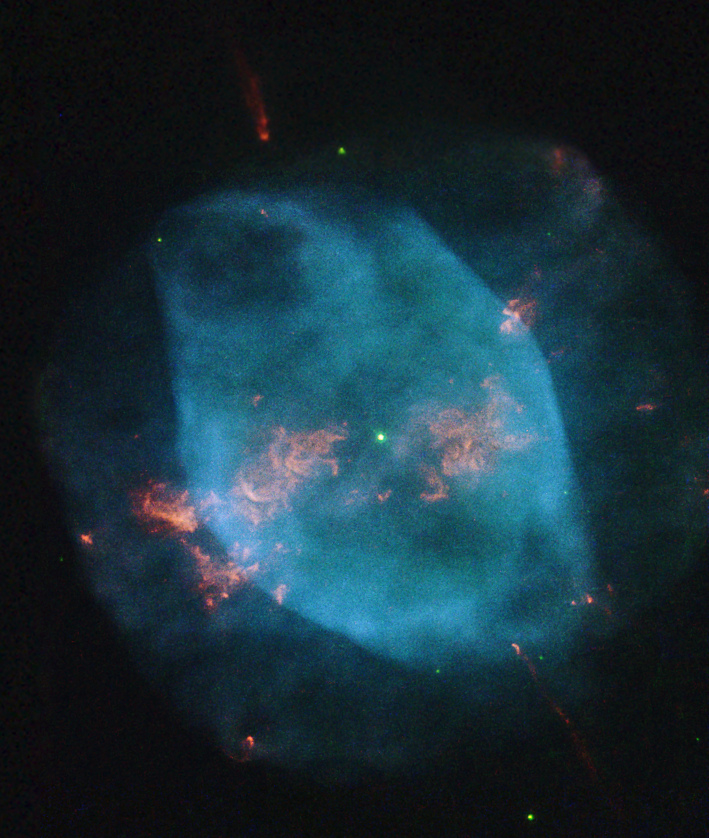
- Hubble Space Telescope image of NGC 7354

Observation data: J2000 epoch
- Right ascension: 22^{h} 40^{m} 19.87387^{s}
- Declination: +61° 17′ 08.7444″
- Distance: 5,538 ly (1,698 pc)
- Apparent dimensions (V): 20.0″
- Constellation: Cepheus
- Designations: PN G107.8+02.3, IRAS 22384+6101, NGC 7354

NGC 7354 is a planetary nebula located in the northern circumpolar constellation of Cepheus, at a distance of approximately 5.5 kly from the Sun. It was discovered by German-born astronomer William Herschel on November 3, 1787. John L. E. Dreyer described it as, "a planetary nebula, bright, small, round, pretty gradually a very little brighter middle".

This nebula is the result of an aging star casting off its outer atmosphere. Overall the nebula is elliptical in form, with a complex interior structure having inner and outer shells, several bright equatorial knots, and two jet-like features near the nebula poles. The rim of the inner shell is ellipsoidal with an aspect ratio of 1.6 and a major axis spanning 30″. The outer shell is more circular, and is approximately 33″ in diameter. The faint outer shell is expanding with a higher velocity than the inner shell, and the knots are moving at the same velocity as the outer shell. The outer shell has an estimated age of 2,500 years, while the inner shell is 1,600 years old.

The morphological features of the nebula may be explained by an interacting binary star system with one of the pair passing through the asymptotic giant branch phase. The jets may be generated by an accretion disk surrounding the resulting white dwarf star. Additionally, an analysis of Gaia data suggests that the central star is binary.
