= NGC 7008 =

Planetary nebula in the constellation Cygnus

Emission nebula
- Planetary nebula
- Taken By Hunter Outten in Ariii-Ha-Oiii

Observation data: J2000 epoch
- Right ascension: 21^{h} 00^{m} 32.503^{s}
- Declination: +54° 32′ 36.18″
- Distance: 2,800 ly
- Apparent magnitude (V): 12.0
- Apparent dimensions (V): 1.4'x1.1'
- Constellation: Cygnus

Physical characteristics
- Radius: ≈ 0.5 ly ly
- Absolute magnitude (V): 12.0
- Designations: NGC 7008, Fetus Nebula; PK 93+5.2

NGC 7008 (PK 93+5.2), also known as the Coat Button Nebula or Fetus Nebula, is a planetary nebula with a diameter of approximately 1 light-year located at a distance of 2800 light years in northern Cygnus. It was discovered by William Herschel in 1787, in Slough, England. NGC 7008 (H I-192) is included in the Astronomical League's Herschel 400 observing program. NGC 7008 is that its intricate and delicate structures make it a fascinating target for both amateur and professional astronomers studying the late stages of stellar evolution and the formation of planetary nebulae.
