= NGC 3199 =

H II region in the constellation Carina

Emission nebula
- VLT Survey Telescope

Observation data: J2000 epoch
- Right ascension: 10^{h} 16^{m} 32.8^{s}
- Declination: −57° 56′ 02″
- Constellation: Carina
- Designations: GUM 28, RCW 48

NGC 3199 is an emission nebula in the constellation Carina. It is commonly known as the Banana Nebula or Carina's Smile. The object was discovered in 1826 by the Scottish astronomer James Dunlop. It was thought to be the bow shock around the central star, WR 18, an especially hot and luminous Wolf–Rayet star; however, it was determined that the nebula formed due to the composition of local space, not because of the star's movement.

== See also ==
- List of NGC objects
