= NGC 2164 =

10th-magnitude open cluster in the constellation Dorado

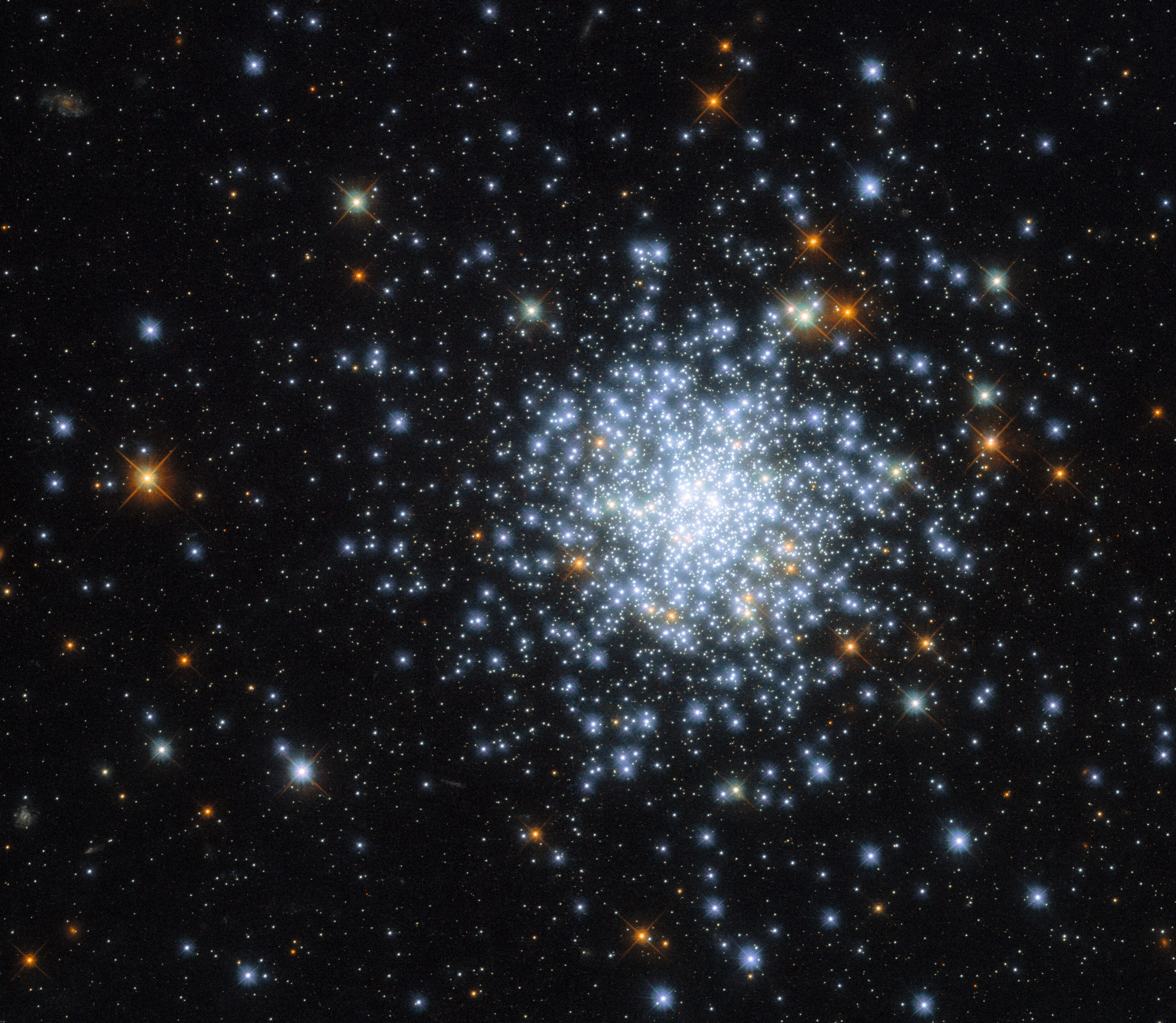
- NGC 2164, taken by the Hubble Telescope

Observation data (J2000 epoch)
- Right ascension: 05^{h} 58^{m} 55.90^{s}
- Declination: −68 30 58.09°
- Distance: 160 kly (50 kpc)
- Apparent magnitude (V): 10.5

Physical characteristics
- Other designations: ESO 57-62

Associations
- Constellation: Dorado

NGC 2164 is a 10th-magnitude open cluster in the constellation Dorado. The celestial object was discovered on September 27, 1826, by the Scottish astronomer James Dunlop. Its apparent size is 2.5 arcmin. It is located in the Large Magellanic Cloud.
