= IC 1295 =

Planetary nebula in the constellation Scutum

Emission nebula
- Planetary nebula
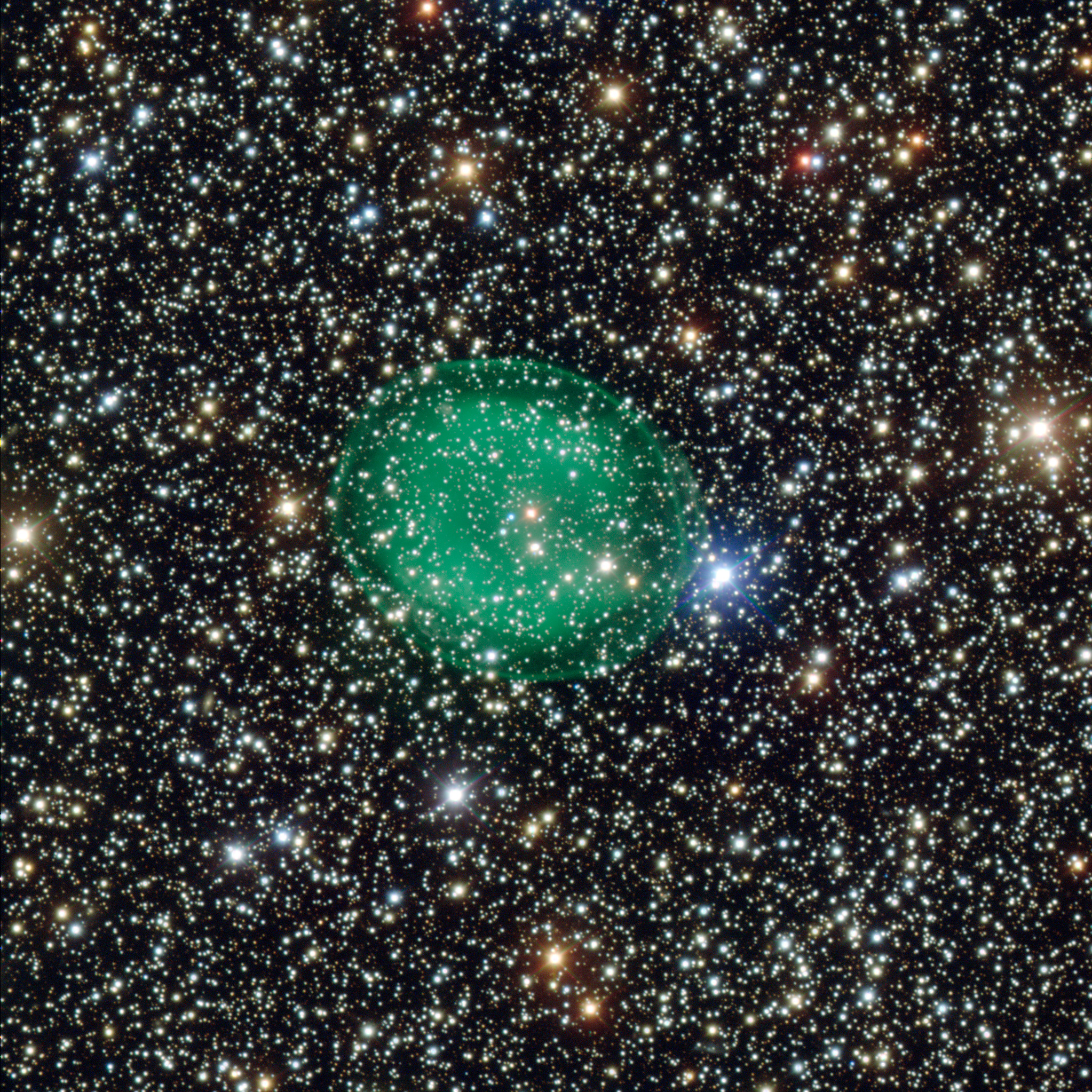
- The most detailed image of IC 1295 captured so far.

Observation data: J2000 epoch
- Right ascension: 18^{h} 54^{m} 37.206^{s}
- Declination: −08° 49′ 39.08″
- Distance: 4700 ly (1500 pc)
- Apparent magnitude (V): 12.7
- Apparent dimensions (V): 1.7 × 1.4 arcmin
- Constellation: Scutum
- Designations: PK25-4.2

IC 1295 is a planetary nebula in the constellation Scutum. It was discovered in 1867 by Truman Safford. It lies roughly 4,700 light-years (1,500 parsecs) away.

The central star of the planetary nebula has a spectral type of DAO.56 and shows the hydrogen deficient class object as hgO(H).

== See also ==
- List of planetary nebulae
- Index Catalogue
