= NGC 7026 =

Planetary nebula in the constellation Cygnus

Emission nebula
- Planetary nebula
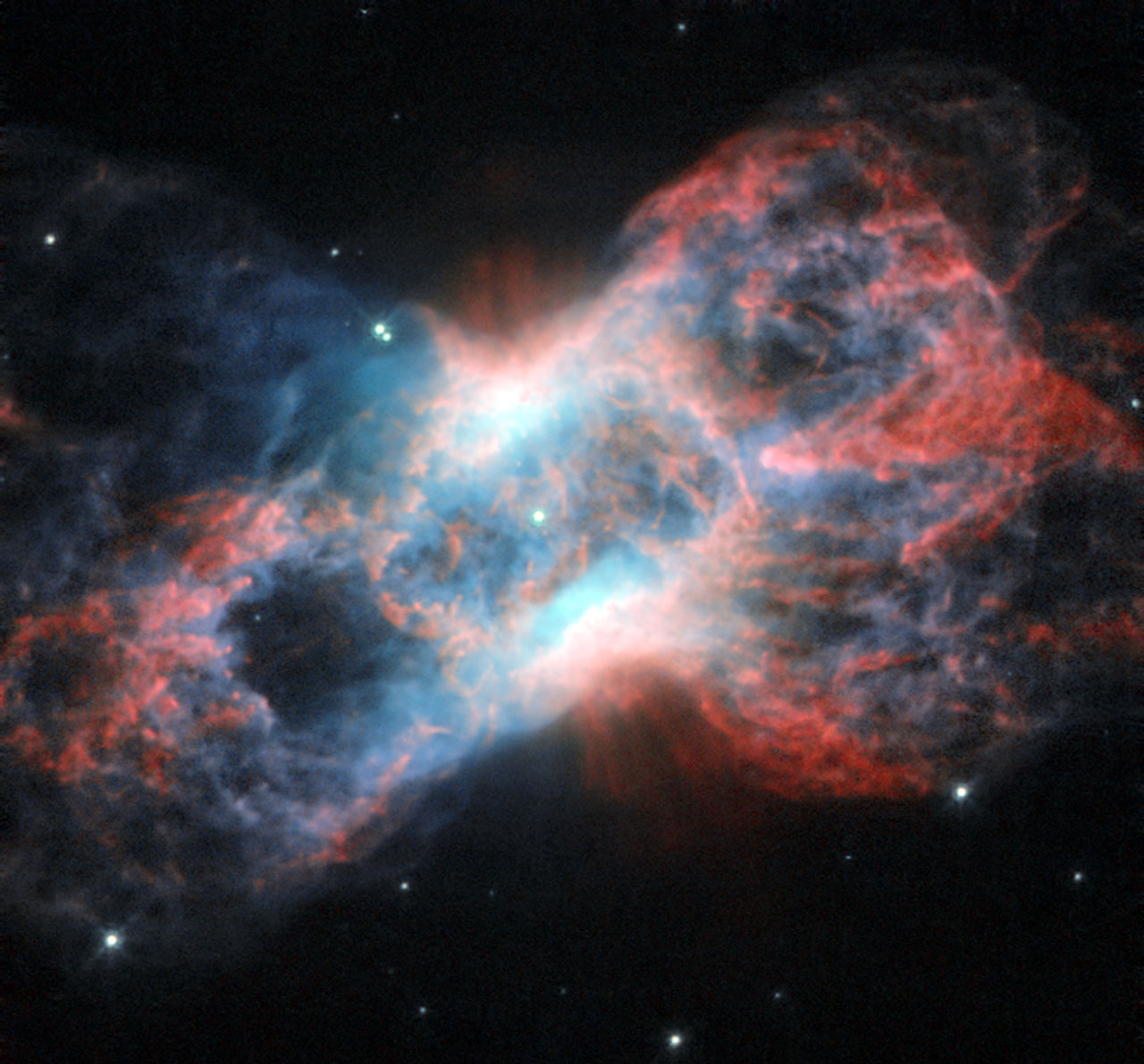
- Composite image using optical images from the HST.

Observation data: J2000 epoch
- Right ascension: 21^{h} 06^{m} 18.237^{s}
- Declination: +47° 51′ 07.15″
- Distance: 6000 light years ly
- Apparent magnitude (V): 15.33B
- Constellation: Cygnus
- Designations: GSC2 N0331022145839, 2MASX J21061823+4751071, PN ARO 59, CSI+47-21046, GT 2104+476, PK 089+00 1, PN VV 260, DO 39213, HBHA 4703-62, PLX 5080, PN VV' 542, EM* CDS 1218, HD 201192, PLX 5080.00, [KW97] 55-39, GCRV 13271, IRAS 21046+4739, PN G089.0+00.3, [TGC96] 2104+4739

NGC 7026, also known as the Cheeseburger Nebula, is a planetary nebula located 6000 light-years away, in the constellation of Cygnus. The central star of the planetary nebula has a spectral type of [WO3], indicating a spectrum similar to that of an oxygen-rich Wolf–Rayet star. An analysis of Gaia data suggests that it is a binary system.

== See also ==
- List of planetary nebulae
- List of NGC objects (7000-7840)
