= M&M Double Cluster =

The M&M Double Cluster may refer to either of two astronomical objects in the constellation Perseus:

- NGC 1528
- NGC 1545
