= Bennett Catalogue =

The Bennett Catalogue (or the Jack Bennett Catalogue; typically abbreviated as Ben) is a list of 152 comet-like deep-sky objects visible from mid-southern latitudes (South Africa in particular), compiled by South African amateur astronomer John Caister Bennett (1914–1990). Nearly half of all objects in the Bennett Catalogue are globular clusters, since they tend to resemble comets.

== History ==
The first 130 objects were published in the August 1969 issue of the Monthly Notes of the Astronomical Society of Southern Africa. 22 more objects were added in the August 1974 issue. Bennett Catalogue numbers with lowercase "a" and "b" added after numbers are 1974 additions. Bennett Catalogue numbers with no letter suffixes are the original 1969 entries.

== Overlap with other major catalogues ==
All Bennett Catalogue objects have NGC designations except for the open clusters Ben 47 (Melotte 105) and Ben 72a (Trumpler 23); Ben 129b (IC 1459), a galaxy, has an IC designation (IC is an extension of NGC). Many Bennett Catalogue objects are also found in the Messier and Caldwell catalogues.

== Star chart ==
Chart of Bennett Catalogue objects using Bennett's designations

Chart of Bennett Catalogue objects using NGC numbers and other standard designations

== Key ==
Open cluster Globular cluster Diffuse nebula Planetary nebula Galaxy

== List ==
Bennett catalogue
Bennett no.	NGC Designation	Other designations	Object type	Constellation	Right ascension (J2000)	Declination (J2000)
Ben 1	NGC 55	Caldwell 72, String of Pearls Galaxy	Galaxy	Sculptor	00^{h} 14^{m} 54^{s}	−39° 11′
Ben 2	NGC 104	Caldwell 106, 47 Tucanae	Globular cluster	Tucana	00^{h} 24^{m} 06^{s}	−72° 05′
Ben 3	NGC 247	Caldwell 62	Galaxy	Cetus	00^{h} 47^{m} 06^{s}	−20° 46′
Ben 4	NGC 253	Caldwell 65, Sculptor Galaxy	Galaxy	Sculptor	00^{h} 47^{m} 36^{s}	−25° 17′
Ben 5	NGC 288		Globular cluster	Sculptor	00^{h} 52^{m} 48^{s}	−26° 35′
Ben 6	NGC 300	Caldwell 70, Sculptor Pinwheel Galaxy	Galaxy	Sculptor	00^{h} 54^{m} 54^{s}	−37° 41′
Ben 7	NGC 362	Caldwell 104	Globular cluster	Tucana	01^{h} 03^{m} 12^{s}	−70° 51′
Ben 8	NGC 613		Galaxy	Sculptor	01^{h} 34^{m} 18^{s}	−29° 25′
Ben 9	NGC 1068	Messier 77, Cetus A, Squid Galaxy	Galaxy	Cetus	02^{h} 42^{m} 42^{s}	−00° 01′
Ben 10	NGC 1097	Caldwell 67	Galaxy	Fornax	02^{h} 46^{m} 18^{s}	−30° 17′
Ben 10a	NGC 1232	Eye of God	Galaxy	Eridanus	03^{h} 09^{m} 48^{s}	−20° 35′
Ben 11	NGC 1261	Caldwell 87	Globular cluster	Horologium	03^{h} 12^{m} 18^{s}	−55° 13′
Ben 12	NGC 1291	Snow Collar Galaxy	Galaxy	Eridanus	03^{h} 17^{m} 18^{s}	−41° 08′
Ben 13	NGC 1313		Galaxy	Reticulum	03^{h} 18^{m} 18^{s}	−66° 30′
Ben 14	NGC 1316	Fornax A	Galaxy	Fornax	03^{h} 22^{m} 42^{s}	−37° 12′
Ben 14a	NGC 1350		Galaxy	Fornax	03^{h} 31^{m} 06^{s}	−33° 38′
Ben 15	NGC 1360	Comet Planetary Nebula	Planetary nebula	Fornax	03^{h} 33^{m} 18^{s}	−25° 51′
Ben 16	NGC 1365		Galaxy	Fornax	03^{h} 33^{m} 36^{s}	−36° 08′
Ben 17	NGC 1380		Galaxy	Fornax	03^{h} 36^{m} 30^{s}	−34° 59′
Ben 18	NGC 1387		Galaxy	Fornax	03^{h} 37^{m} 00^{s}	−35° 31′
Ben 19	NGC 1399		Galaxy	Fornax	03^{h} 38^{m} 30^{s}	−35° 27′
Ben 19a	NGC 1398		Galaxy	Fornax	03^{h} 38^{m} 54^{s}	−26° 20′
Ben 20	NGC 1404		Galaxy	Eridanus	03^{h} 38^{m} 54^{s}	−35° 35′
Ben 21	NGC 1433		Galaxy	Horologium	03^{h} 42^{m} 00^{s}	−47° 13′
Ben 21a	NGC 1512		Galaxy	Horologium	04^{h} 03^{m} 54^{s}	−43° 21′
Ben 22	NGC 1535	Cleopatra's Eye	Planetary nebula	Eridanus	04^{h} 14^{m} 12^{s}	−12° 44′
Ben 23	NGC 1549		Galaxy	Dorado	04^{h} 15^{m} 42^{s}	−55° 36′
Ben 24	NGC 1553		Galaxy	Dorado	04^{h} 16^{m} 12^{s}	−55° 47′
Ben 25	NGC 1566		Galaxy	Dorado	04^{h} 20^{m} 00^{s}	−54° 56′
Ben 25a	NGC 1617		Galaxy	Dorado	04^{h} 31^{m} 42^{s}	−54° 36′
Ben 26	NGC 1672		Galaxy	Dorado	04^{h} 45^{m} 42^{s}	−59° 15′
Ben 27	NGC 1763		Diffuse nebula	Dorado	04^{h} 56^{m} 48^{s}	−66° 24′
Ben 28	NGC 1783		Globular cluster	Dorado	04^{h} 58^{m} 54^{s}	−66° 00′
Ben 29	NGC 1792		Galaxy	Columba	05^{h} 05^{m} 12^{s}	−37° 59′
Ben 30	NGC 1818		Globular cluster	Dorado	05^{h} 04^{m} 12^{s}	−66° 24′
Ben 31	NGC 1808		Galaxy	Columba	05^{h} 07^{m} 42^{s}	−37° 31′
Ben 32	NGC 1851	Caldwell 73	Globular cluster	Columba	05^{h} 14^{m} 06^{s}	−40° 03′
Ben 33	NGC 1866		Globular cluster	Dorado	05^{h} 13^{m} 30^{s}	−65° 28′
Ben 34	NGC 1904	Messier 79	Globular cluster	Lepus	05^{h} 24^{m} 30^{s}	−24° 33′
Ben 35	NGC 2070	Caldwell 103, Tarantula Nebula	Diffuse nebula	Dorado	05^{h} 38^{m} 36^{s}	−69° 05′
Ben 36	NGC 2214		Open cluster	Dorado	06^{h} 12^{m} 48^{s}	−68° 16′
Ben 36a	NGC 2243		Open cluster	Canis Major	06^{h} 29^{m} 48^{s}	−31° 17′
Ben 37	NGC 2298		Globular cluster	Puppis	06^{h} 49^{m} 00^{s}	−36° 00′
Ben 37a	NGC 2467		Diffuse nebula	Puppis	07^{h} 52^{m} 36^{s}	−26° 23′
Ben 38	NGC 2489		Open cluster	Puppis	07^{h} 56^{m} 12^{s}	−30° 04′
Ben 39	NGC 2506	Caldwell 54	Open cluster	Monoceros	08^{h} 0^{m} 00^{s}	−10° 47′
Ben 40	NGC 2627		Open cluster	Pyxis	08^{h} 37^{m} 18^{s}	−29° 57′
Ben 40a	NGC 2671		Open cluster	Vela	08^{h} 46^{m} 12^{s}	−41° 53′
Ben 41	NGC 2808		Globular cluster	Carina	09^{h} 12^{m} 00^{s}	−64° 52′
Ben 41a	NGC 2972		Open cluster	Vela	09^{h} 40^{m} 18^{s}	−50° 20′
Ben 41b	NGC 2997		Galaxy	Antlia	09^{h} 45^{m} 36^{s}	−31° 11′
Ben 42	NGC 3115	Caldwell 53, Spindle Galaxy	Galaxy	Sextans	10^{h} 05^{m} 12^{s}	−07° 43′
Ben 43	NGC 3132	Caldwell 74, Eight Burst Nebula	Planetary nebula	Vela	10^{h} 07^{m} 00^{s}	−40° 26′
Ben 44	NGC 3201	Caldwell 79	Globular cluster	Vela	10^{h} 17^{m} 36^{s}	−46° 25′
Ben 45	NGC 3242	Caldwell 59, Ghost of Jupiter	Planetary nebula	Hydra	10^{h} 24^{m} 48^{s}	−18° 38′
Ben 46	NGC 3621	Frame Galaxy	Galaxy	Hydra	11^{h} 18^{m} 18^{s}	−32° 49′
Ben 47	–	Melotte 105	Open cluster	Carina	11^{h} 19^{m} 39^{s}	−63° 30′
Ben 48	NGC 3960		Open cluster	Centaurus	11^{h} 50^{m} 52^{s}	−55° 41′
Ben 49	NGC 3923		Galaxy	Hydra	11^{h} 51^{m} 00^{s}	−28° 48′
Ben 50	NGC 4372	Caldwell 108	Globular cluster	Musca	12^{h} 25^{m} 48^{s}	−72° 40′
Ben 51	NGC 4590	Messier 68	Globular cluster	Hydra	12^{h} 39^{m} 30^{s}	−26° 45′
Ben 52	NGC 4594	Messier 104, Sombrero Galaxy	Galaxy	Virgo	12^{h} 40^{m} 00^{s}	−11° 37′
Ben 53	NGC 4697	Caldwell 52	Galaxy	Virgo	12^{h} 48^{m} 36^{s}	−05° 48′
Ben 54	NGC 4699	Vinyl LP Galaxy	Galaxy	Virgo	12^{h} 49^{m} 00^{s}	−08° 40′
Ben 55	NGC 4753	Dust Devil Galaxy	Galaxy	Virgo	12^{h} 52^{m} 24^{s}	−01° 12′
Ben 56	NGC 4833	Caldwell 105	Globular cluster	Musca	12^{h} 59^{m} 36^{s}	−70° 53′
Ben 57	NGC 4945	Caldwell 83	Galaxy	Centaurus	13^{h} 05^{m} 24^{s}	−49° 28′
Ben 58	NGC 4976		Galaxy	Centaurus	13^{h} 08^{m} 36^{s}	−49° 30′
Ben 59	NGC 5061		Galaxy	Hydra	13^{h} 18^{m} 06^{s}	−26° 50′
Ben 59a	NGC 5068		Galaxy	Virgo	13^{h} 18^{m} 54^{s}	−21° 02′
Ben 60	NGC 5128	Caldwell 77, Centaurus A	Galaxy	Centaurus	13^{h} 25^{m} 30^{s}	−43° 01′
Ben 61	NGC 5139	Caldwell 80, Omega Centauri	Globular cluster	Centaurus	13^{h} 26^{m} 48^{s}	−47° 29′
Ben 62	NGC 5189		Planetary nebula	Musca	13^{h} 33^{m} 30^{s}	−65° 59′
Ben 63	NGC 5236	Messier 83, Southern Pinwheel Galaxy	Galaxy	Hydra	13^{h} 37^{m} 00^{s}	−29° 52′
Ben 63a	NGC 5253		Galaxy	Centaurus	13^{h} 39^{m} 54^{s}	−31° 39′
Ben 64	NGC 5286	Caldwell 84	Globular cluster	Centaurus	13^{h} 46^{m} 24^{s}	−51° 22′
Ben 65	NGC 5617		Open cluster	Centaurus	14^{h} 29^{m} 48^{s}	−60° 43′
Ben 66	NGC 5634		Globular cluster	Virgo	14^{h} 29^{m} 36^{s}	−05° 59′
Ben 67	NGC 5824		Globular cluster	Lupus	15^{h} 04^{m} 00^{s}	−33° 04′
Ben 68	NGC 5897	Ghost Globular	Globular cluster	Libra	15^{h} 17^{m} 24^{s}	−21° 01′
Ben 69	NGC 5927		Globular cluster	Lupus	15^{h} 28^{m} 00^{s}	−50° 40′
Ben 70	NGC 5986		Globular cluster	Lupus	15^{h} 46^{m} 06^{s}	−37° 47′
Ben 71	NGC 5999		Open cluster	Norma	15^{h} 52^{m} 12^{s}	−56° 28′
Ben 72	NGC 6005		Open cluster	Norma	15^{h} 55^{m} 48^{s}	−57° 26′
Ben 72a	–	Trumpler 23	Open cluster	Norma	16^{h} 01^{m} 30^{s}	−53° 32′
Ben 73	NGC 6093	Messier 80	Globular cluster	Scorpius	16^{h} 17^{m} 00^{s}	−22° 59′
Ben 74	NGC 6101	Caldwell 107	Globular cluster	Apus	16^{h} 25^{m} 48^{s}	−72° 12′
Ben 75	NGC 6121	Messier 4, Spider Globular Cluster	Globular cluster	Scorpius	16^{h} 23^{m} 36^{s}	−26° 32′
Ben 76	NGC 6134		Open cluster	Norma	16^{h} 27^{m} 42^{s}	−49° 09′
Ben 77	NGC 6144		Globular cluster	Scorpius	16^{h} 27^{m} 18^{s}	−26° 02′
Ben 78	NGC 6139		Globular cluster	Scorpius	16^{h} 27^{m} 42^{s}	−38° 51′
Ben 79	NGC 6171	Messier 107, Crucifix Cluster	Globular cluster	Ophiuchus	16^{h} 32^{m} 30^{s}	−13° 03′
Ben 79a	NGC 6167		Open cluster	Norma	16^{h} 34^{m} 24^{s}	−49° 36′
Ben 79b	NGC 6192		Open cluster	Scorpius	16^{h} 40^{m} 18^{s}	−43° 22′
Ben 80	NGC 6218	Messier 12	Globular cluster	Ophiuchus	16^{h} 47^{m} 12^{s}	−01° 57′
Ben 81	NGC 6216		Open cluster	Scorpius	16^{h} 49^{m} 24^{s}	−44° 44′
Ben 82	NGC 6235		Globular cluster	Ophiuchus	16^{h} 53^{m} 24^{s}	−22° 11′
Ben 83	NGC 6254	Messier 10	Globular cluster	Ophiuchus	16^{h} 57^{m} 06^{s}	−04° 06′
Ben 84	NGC 6253		Open cluster	Ara	16^{h} 59^{m} 06^{s}	−52° 43′
Ben 85	NGC 6266	Messier 62, Flickering Globular	Globular cluster	Ophiuchus	17^{h} 01^{m} 12^{s}	−30° 07′
Ben 86	NGC 6273	Messier 19	Globular cluster	Ophiuchus	17^{h} 02^{m} 36^{s}	−26° 16′
Ben 87	NGC 6284		Globular cluster	Ophiuchus	17^{h} 04^{m} 30^{s}	−24° 46′
Ben 88	NGC 6287		Globular cluster	Ophiuchus	17^{h} 05^{m} 12^{s}	−22° 42′
Ben 89	NGC 6293		Globular cluster	Ophiuchus	17^{h} 10^{m} 12^{s}	−26° 35′
Ben 90	NGC 6304		Globular cluster	Ophiuchus	17^{h} 14^{m} 30^{s}	−29° 28′
Ben 91	NGC 6316		Globular cluster	Ophiuchus	17^{h} 16^{m} 36^{s}	−28° 08′
Ben 91a	NGC 6318		Open cluster	Scorpius	17^{h} 17^{m} 48^{s}	−39° 27′
Ben 92	NGC 6333	Messier 9	Globular cluster	Ophiuchus	17^{h} 19^{m} 12^{s}	−18° 31′
Ben 93	NGC 6356		Globular cluster	Ophiuchus	17^{h} 23^{m} 36^{s}	−17° 49′
Ben 94	NGC 6352	Caldwell 81	Globular cluster	Ara	17^{h} 25^{m} 30^{s}	−48° 25′
Ben 95	NGC 6362		Globular cluster	Ara	17^{h} 31^{m} 54^{s}	−67° 03′
Ben 96	NGC 6388		Globular cluster	Scorpius	17^{h} 36^{m} 18^{s}	−44° 44′
Ben 97	NGC 6402	Messier 14	Globular cluster	Ophiuchus	17^{h} 37^{m} 36^{s}	−03° 15′
Ben 98	NGC 6397	Caldwell 86	Globular cluster	Ara	17^{h} 40^{m} 42^{s}	−53° 40′
Ben 98a	NGC 6440		Globular cluster	Sagittarius	17^{h} 48^{m} 54^{s}	−20° 22′
Ben 98b	NGC 6445	Box Nebula	Planetary nebula	Sagittarius	17^{h} 49^{m} 12^{s}	−20° 01′
Ben 99	NGC 6441	Silver Nugget Cluster	Globular cluster	Scorpius	17^{h} 50^{m} 12^{s}	−37° 03′
Ben 100	NGC 6496		Globular cluster	Scorpius	17^{h} 59^{m} 00^{s}	−44° 16′
Ben 101	NGC 6522		Globular cluster	Sagittarius	18^{h} 03^{m} 36^{s}	−30° 02′
Ben 102	NGC 6528		Globular cluster	Sagittarius	18^{h} 04^{m} 48^{s}	−30° 03′
Ben 103	NGC 6544	Starfish Cluster	Globular cluster	Sagittarius	18^{h} 07^{m} 18^{s}	−25° 00′
Ben 104	NGC 6541	Caldwell 78	Globular cluster	Corona Australis	18^{h} 08^{m} 00^{s}	−43° 42′
Ben 105	NGC 6553		Globular cluster	Sagittarius	18^{h} 09^{m} 18^{s}	−25° 54′
Ben 106	NGC 6569		Globular cluster	Sagittarius	18^{h} 13^{m} 36^{s}	−31° 50′
Ben 107	NGC 6584		Globular cluster	Telescopium	18^{h} 18^{m} 36^{s}	−52° 13′
Ben 107a	NGC 6603		Open cluster	Sagittarius	18^{h} 18^{m} 24^{s}	−18° 25′
Ben 108	NGC 6618	Messier 17, Omega Nebula, Swan Nebula	Diffuse nebula	Sagittarius	18^{h} 20^{m} 48^{s}	−16° 11′
Ben 109	NGC 6624		Globular cluster	Sagittarius	18^{h} 23^{m} 42^{s}	−30° 22′
Ben 110	NGC 6626	Messier 28	Globular cluster	Sagittarius	18^{h} 24^{m} 30^{s}	−24° 52′
Ben 111	NGC 6638		Globular cluster	Sagittarius	18^{h} 30^{m} 54^{s}	−25° 30′
Ben 112	NGC 6637	Messier 69	Globular cluster	Sagittarius	18^{h} 31^{m} 24^{s}	−32° 21′
Ben 112a	NGC 6642		Globular cluster	Sagittarius	18^{h} 31^{m} 54^{s}	−23° 29′
Ben 113	NGC 6652		Globular cluster	Sagittarius	18^{h} 35^{m} 48^{s}	−32° 59′
Ben 114	NGC 6656	Messier 22, Great Sagittarius Cluster	Globular cluster	Sagittarius	18^{h} 36^{m} 24^{s}	−23° 54′
Ben 115	NGC 6681	Messier 70	Globular cluster	Sagittarius	18^{h} 43^{m} 12^{s}	−32° 18′
Ben 116	NGC 6705	Messier 11, Wild Duck Cluster	Open cluster	Scutum	18^{h} 51^{m} 06^{s}	−06° 16′
Ben 117	NGC 6712		Globular cluster	Scutum	18^{h} 53^{m} 06^{s}	−08° 42′
Ben 118	NGC 6715	Messier 54	Globular cluster	Sagittarius	18^{h} 55^{m} 06^{s}	−30° 29′
Ben 119	NGC 6723		Globular cluster	Sagittarius	18^{h} 59^{m} 36^{s}	−36° 38′
Ben 120	NGC 6744	Caldwell 101	Galaxy	Pavo	19^{h} 09^{m} 48^{s}	−63° 51′
Ben 121	NGC 6752	Caldwell 93, Great Peacock Globular	Globular cluster	Pavo	19^{h} 10^{m} 54^{s}	−59° 59′
Ben 122	NGC 6809	Messier 55, Specter Cluster	Globular cluster	Sagittarius	19^{h} 40^{m} 00^{s}	−30° 58′
Ben 123	NGC 6818	Little Gem Nebula	Planetary nebula	Sagittarius	19^{h} 44^{m} 00^{s}	−14° 09′
Ben 124	NGC 6864	Messier 75	Globular cluster	Sagittarius	20^{h} 06^{m} 06^{s}	−21° 55′
Ben 125	NGC 6981	Messier 72	Globular cluster	Aquarius	20^{h} 53^{m} 30^{s}	−12° 32′
Ben 126	NGC 7009	Caldwell 55, Saturn Nebula	Planetary nebula	Aquarius	21^{h} 04^{m} 12^{s}	−11° 22′
Ben 127	NGC 7089	Messier 2	Globular cluster	Aquarius	21^{h} 33^{m} 30^{s}	−00° 49′
Ben 128	NGC 7099	Messier 30, Jellyfish Cluster	Globular cluster	Capricornus	21^{h} 40^{m} 24^{s}	−23° 11′
Ben 129	NGC 7293	Caldwell 63, Helix Nebula	Planetary nebula	Aquarius	22^{h} 29^{m} 36^{s}	−20° 48′
Ben 129a	NGC 7410		Galaxy	Grus	22^{h} 55^{m} 00^{s}	−39° 40′
Ben 129b	IC 1459		Galaxy	Grus	22^{h} 57^{m} 00^{s}	−36° 28′
Ben 130	NGC 7793	Bond's Galaxy	Galaxy	Sculptor	23^{h} 57^{m} 48^{s}	−32° 35′

== See also ==
- Herschel 400 Catalogue
- List of astronomical catalogues by Stephen James O'Meara
- Category:IC objects
- Category:NGC objects
- Caldwell catalogue
- Index Catalogue (IC)
- Messier Catalogue
- New General Catalogue (NGC)
- Revised Index Catalogue (RIC)
- Revised New General Catalogue (RNGC)
