= NGC 4835 =

Galaxy in the constellation Centaurus

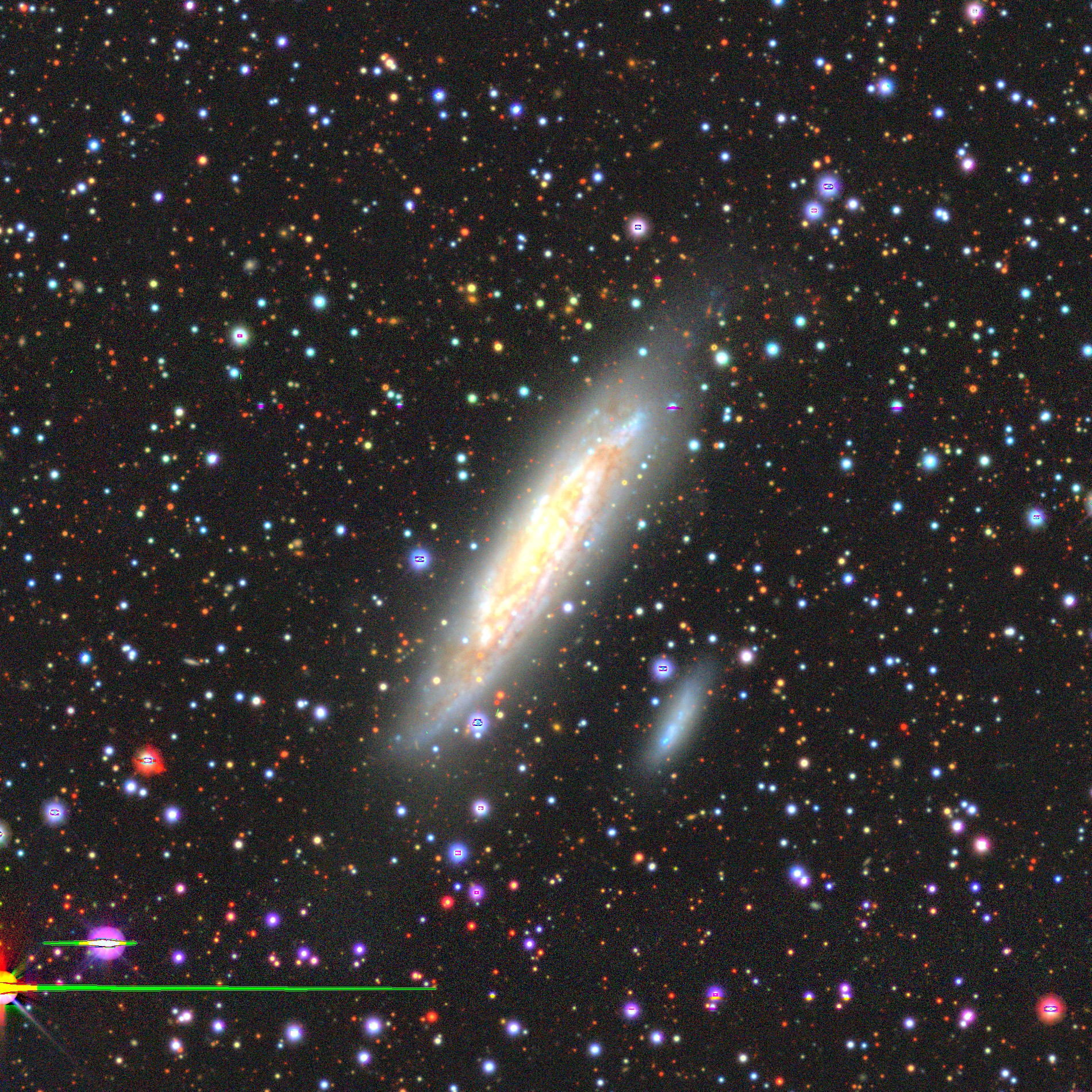
- NGC 4835 imaged by Legacy Surveys

Observation data (J2000 epoch)
- Constellation: Centaurus
- Right ascension: 12^{h} 58^{m} 07.8403^{s}
- Declination: −46° 15′ 51.559″
- Redshift: 0.007275±0.0000170
- Heliocentric radial velocity: 2,181±5 km/s
- Distance: 75.63 ± 2.73 Mly (23.189 ± 0.836 Mpc)
- Group or cluster: [CHM2007] LDC 939
- Apparent magnitude (V): 12.45

Characteristics
- Type: SAB(rs)bc
- Size: ~213,400 ly (65.44 kpc) (estimated)
- Apparent size (V): 4.0′ × 0.9′

Other designations
- ESO 269- G 019, IRAS 12552-4559, 2MASX J12580782-4615511, PGC 44409

NGC 4835 is an intermediate spiral galaxy in the constellation of Centaurus. Its velocity with respect to the cosmic microwave background is 2,441±19 km/s, which corresponds to a Hubble distance of 117.4 ± 8.3 Mly (36.01 ± 2.54 Mpc). However, 18 non-redshift measurements give a much closer mean distance of 75.63 ± 2.73 Mly (23.189 ± 0.836 Mpc). It was discovered by British astronomer John Herschel on 3 June 1834.

NGC 4835 has a possible active galactic nucleus, i.e. it has a compact region at the center of a galaxy that emits a significant amount of energy across the electromagnetic spectrum, with characteristics indicating that this luminosity is not produced by the stars.

== Galaxy group ==
NGC 4835 is part of a galaxy group known as [CHM2007] LDC 939 which contains four galaxies, including NGC 4976, ESO 219-21, and ESO 269-58.

== Supernova ==
One supernova has been observed in NGC 4835:

- SN 2025wrd (Type Ia, mag. 17.129) was discovered by ATLAS on 1 September 2025.

== See also ==
- List of NGC objects (4001–5000)
