= C74 =

C74 or C-74 may be:

- C-74 Globemaster, transport aircraft with transoceanic range
- In lighting, a reversed clothespin used to hold gels and light screens in theatrical productions
- Comiket 74, The 74th Comiket Convention in Japan
- Ruy Lopez (Spanish Game) opening, Encyclopaedia of Chess Openings
- Adrenal tumor ICD-10 code
- Cycling '74, a software development company known for distributing Max/MSP
- Caldwell 74 (NGC 3132, the Eight-Burst Nebula, or the Southern Ring Nebula), a planetary nebula in the constellation Vela
