= NGC 6144 =

Globular cluster in the constellation Scorpius

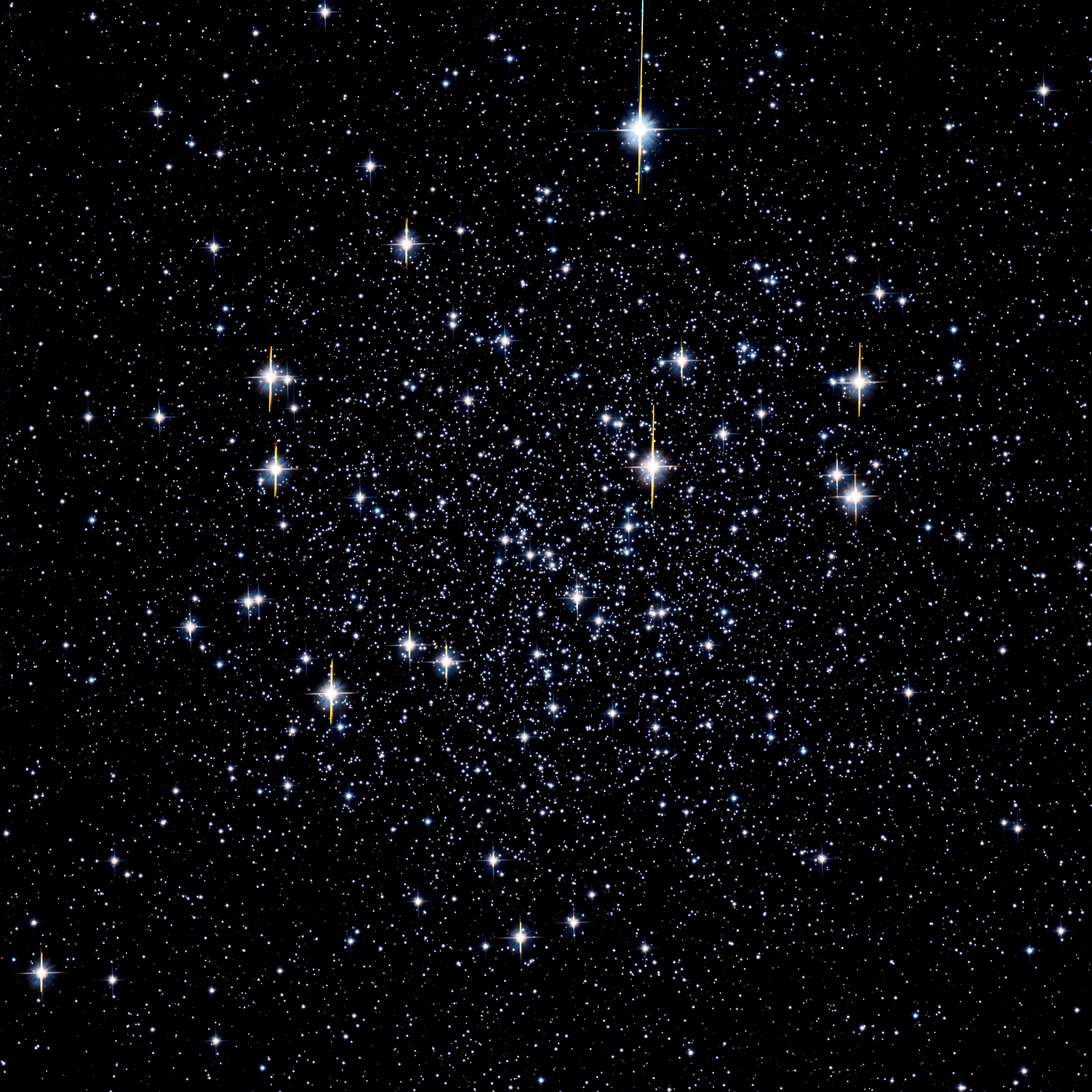
- NGC 6144, imaged by the Hubble Space Telescope

Observation data (J2000 epoch)
- Class: XI
- Constellation: Scorpius
- Right ascension: 16^{h} 27^{m} 14.1^{s}
- Declination: –26° 01′ 29″
- Apparent magnitude (V): +9.63
- Apparent dimensions (V): 1.8′

Physical characteristics
- Metallicity: [Fe/H] = −1.81±0.12 dex

NGC 6144 is a globular cluster in the constellation Scorpius, located almost exactly 1° away from its brighter counterpart globular cluster Messier 4. It is relatively close to and is partially obscured by the Rho Ophiuchi cloud complex. The cluster has a very low core stellar density for a globular cluster and harbors a handful of X-ray radiation sources.
