= NGC 5897 =

Globular cluster in the constellation Libra

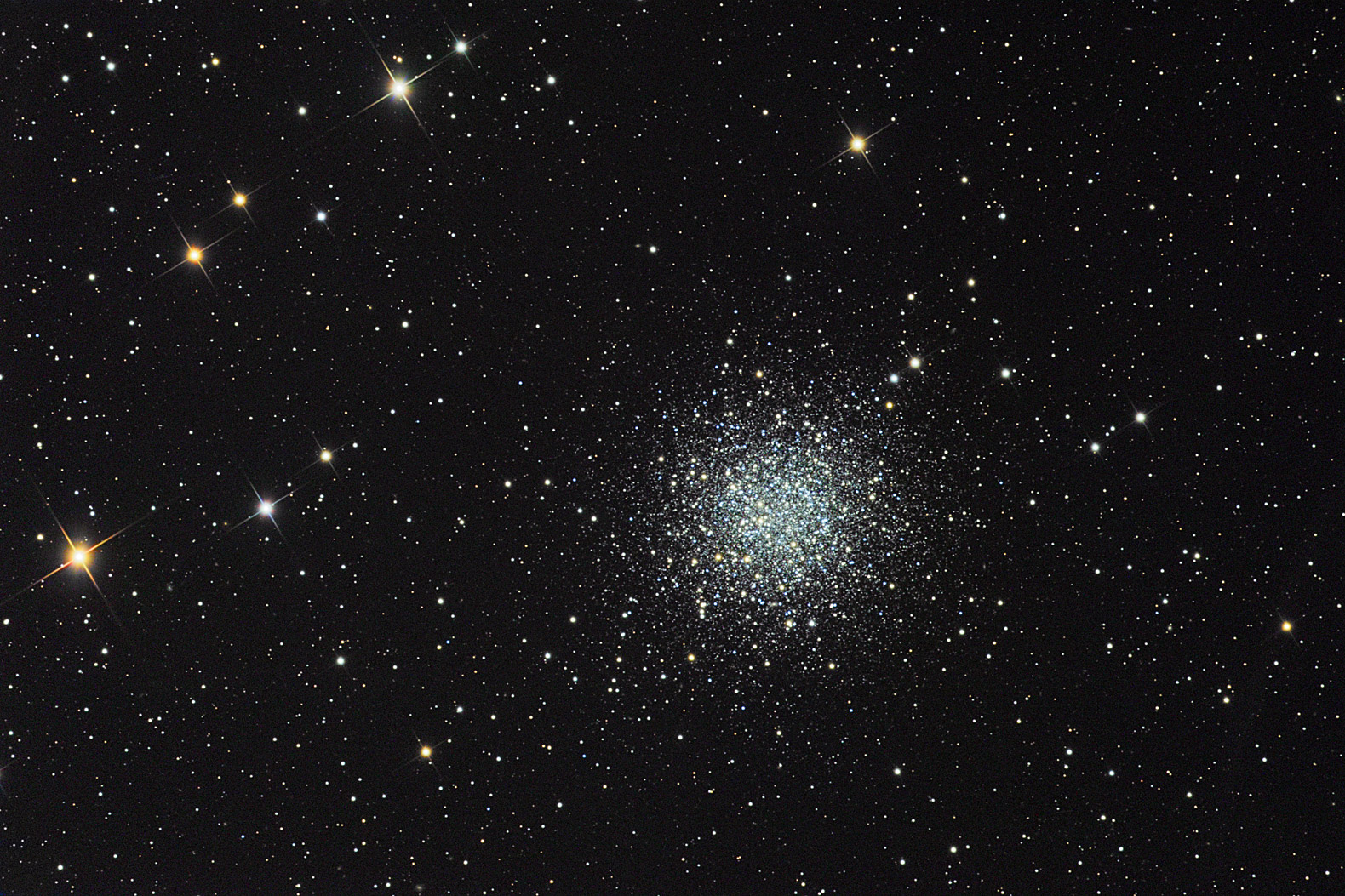
- The globular cluster NGC 5897 imaged with an amateur telescope.

Observation data (J2000 epoch)
- Class: XI
- Constellation: Libra
- Right ascension: 15^{h} 17^{m} 24.40^{s}
- Declination: −21° 00′ 36.4″
- Distance: 24.1 kly (7.4 kpc)
- Apparent magnitude (V): 8.52

Physical characteristics
- Radius: 6.3' x 6.3'
- Metallicity: [Fe/H] = −2.04±0.15 dex
- Other designations: GCl 33, C 1514-208

NGC 5897, also known as the Ghost Globular Cluster, is a globular cluster in the constellation Libra. This satellite of the Milky Way, which is quite remote (located about 41,000 light years away), has a diameter of over 170 light years. With its Shapley–Sawyer Concentration Class of XI, it has very low star density even in its center.

The stars of the cluster have only 0.91% of the Sun's metallicity, while the abundance of elements produced by the alpha process is roughly 5 times larger. This means that the cluster formed in a time before the galaxy formed a disk and spiral arms. However, some of the stars are apparently younger, indicating multiple star-forming epochs.

NGC 5897 has a diameter of 12.6 arcminutes and an apparent magnitude of 8.5.
