= NGC 6496 =

Globular cluster in the constellation Scorpius

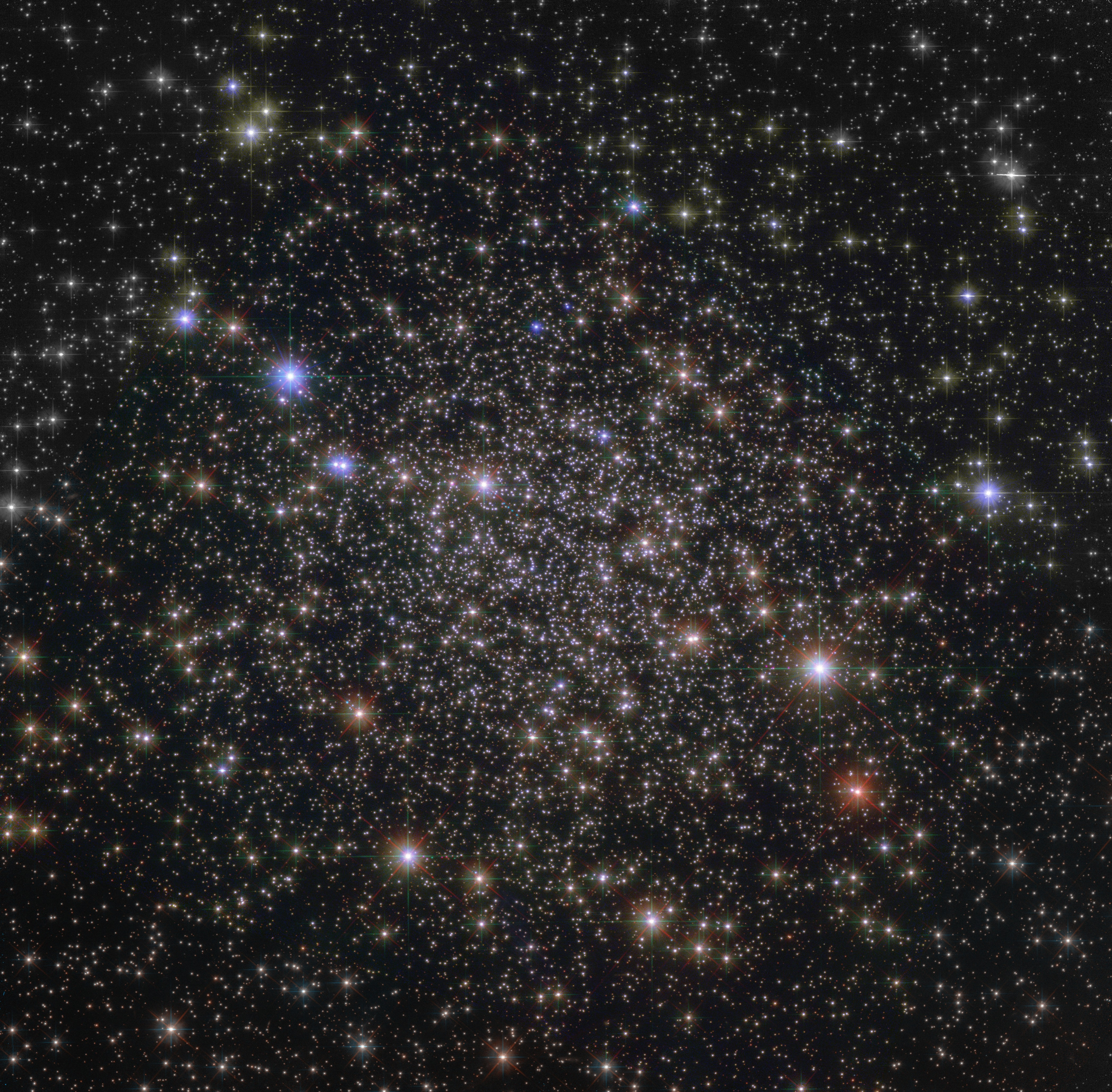
- Processed Hubble Space Telescope image of the globular cluster

Observation data
- Class: XII
- Constellation: Scorpius
- Right ascension: 17^{h} 59^{m} 03.68^{s}
- Declination: −44° 15′ 57.4″
- Distance: 36.9 kly (11.3 kpc)
- Apparent dimensions (V): 5.6'

Physical characteristics
- Mass: 8.2×10^{4} M_{☉}
- Metallicity: [Fe/H] = –0.70 dex
- Estimated age: 12.42 Gyr

NGC 6496 is a globular cluster which is in the direction of the Milky Way's galactic bulge based on observations collected with the WFPC2 on board the Hubble Space Telescope. NGC 6496 was originally believed to be a member of the disc system of the Galactic Center, but scientists questioned this classification. It was instead suggested that NGC 6496, together with two other clusters, NGC 6624 and NGC 6637, could be halo clusters with strongly inclined orbits. NGC 6496 lies in the Southern sky at RA=17:59:03.68 and Dec=−44:15:57.4.

The first CMD presented of NGC 6496 had photometry reaching 2 mag below the horizontal branch, disclosing for the first time the usual red arm of the metal-rich clusters. The extinction towards NGC 6496 is uncertain, with estimates ranging between E(B−V) = 0.09 and E(B−V) = 0.24.

The cluster has a relatively metal-rich composition of [Fe/H] = –0.46 dex and is of an open, uncrowded nature. Few attempts were made to find variable stars in NGC 6496. In one of the studies, thirteen variable stars were detected by Dr. Moe Abbas and Dr. Andrew Layden from Bowling Green State University.

== Gallery ==
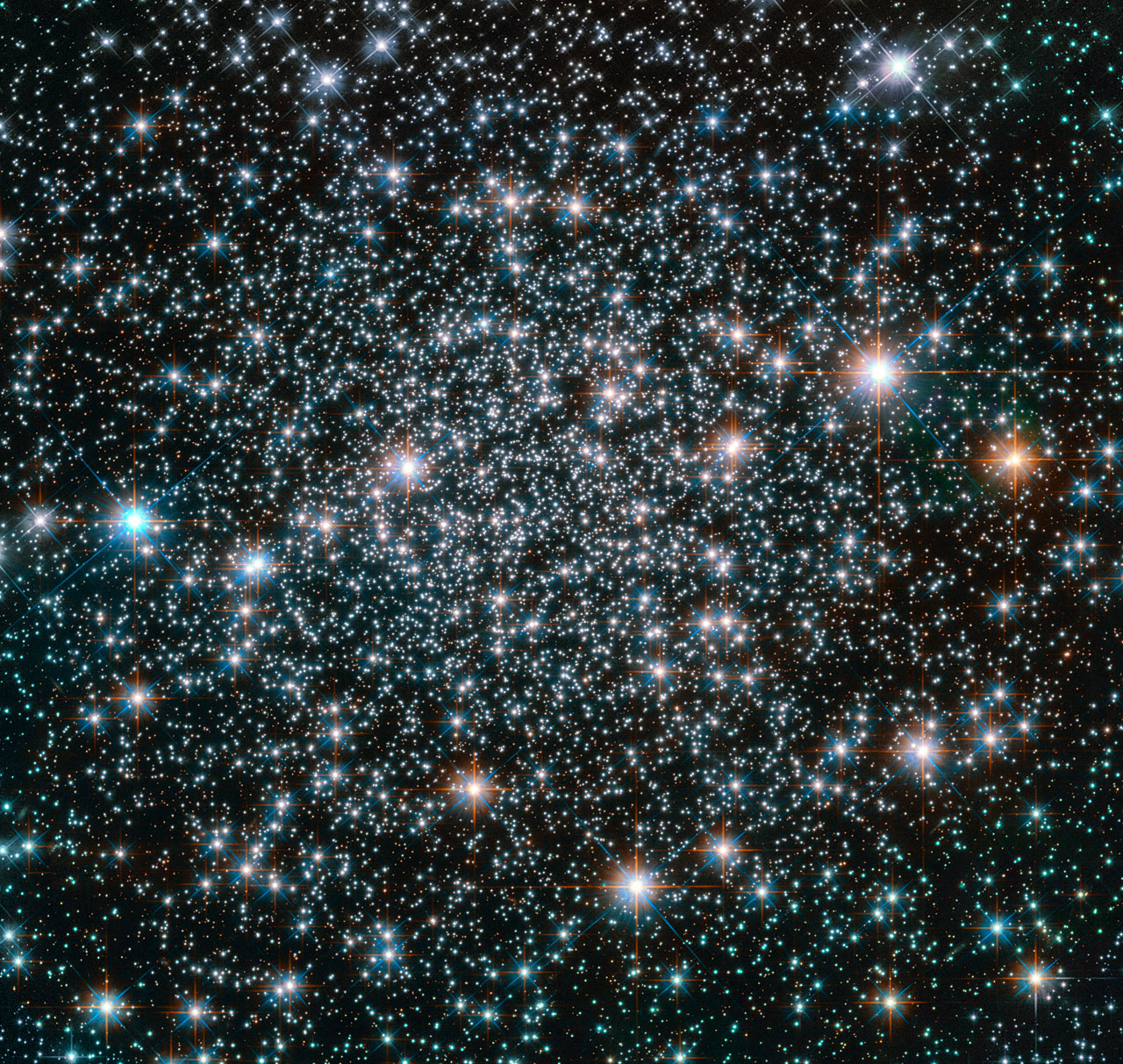
NGC 6496 hosts a selection of long-period variables and short-period eclipsing binaries.
