= NGC 6316 =

Globular cluster in the constellation of Ophiuchus

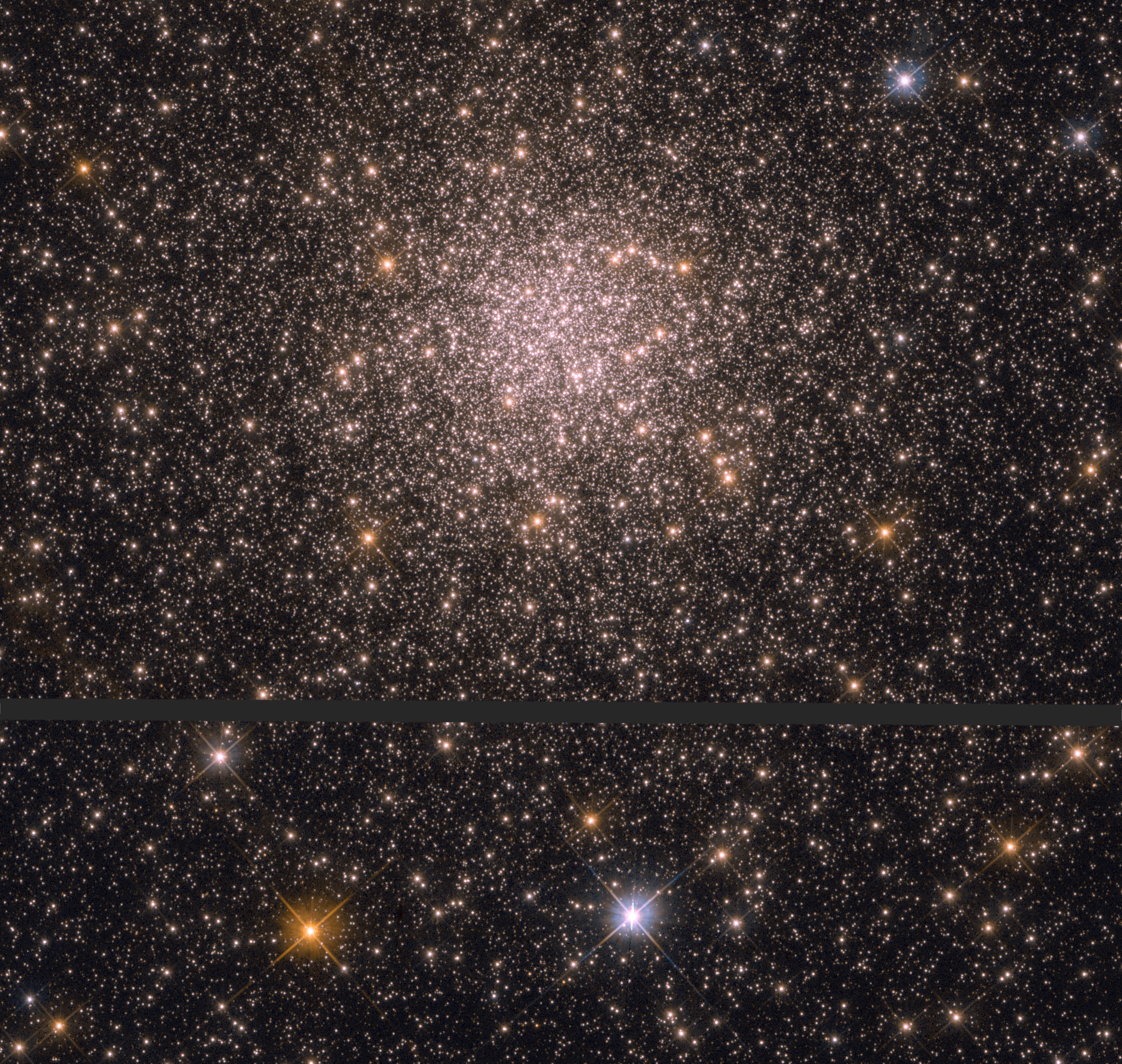
- NGC 6316 as seen through the Hubble Space Telescope

Observation data (J2000 epoch)
- Class: III
- Constellation: Ophiuchus
- Right ascension: 17^{h} 16^{m} 37.42^{s}
- Declination: −28° 08′ 24.0″
- Distance: 36.86 ± 0.98 kly (11.3 ± 0.3 kpc)
- Apparent magnitude (V): 9.03
- Apparent dimensions (V): 4.9′ × 4.9′

Physical characteristics
- Metallicity: [Fe/H] = −0.87±0.2 −0.90 dex
- Estimated age: 13.1 ± 0.5 Gyr
- Notable features: Relatively metal-rich globular cluster
- Other designations: GCl 57, VDBH 219

NGC 6316 is a globular cluster located in the constellation Ophiuchus. Its Shapley-Sawyer Concentration Class is III, meaning that it has a "strong inner core of stars" and was discovered by the German-born British astronomer William Herschel on 24 May 1784. It is at a distance of about 37,000 light years away from the Earth. A metallicity of −0.45, was typically considered for NGC 6316, although new studies suggest this cluster to be more metal Poor, with a metallicity of −0.87 and −0.9; this means that its ratio of hydrogen/helium to other elements is only 35% that of the Sun, but still enough to be considered a "metal-rich" globular cluster.

== See also ==
- List of NGC objects (6001–7000)
- List of NGC objects
