= NGC 6284 =

Globular cluster in the constellation Ophiuchus

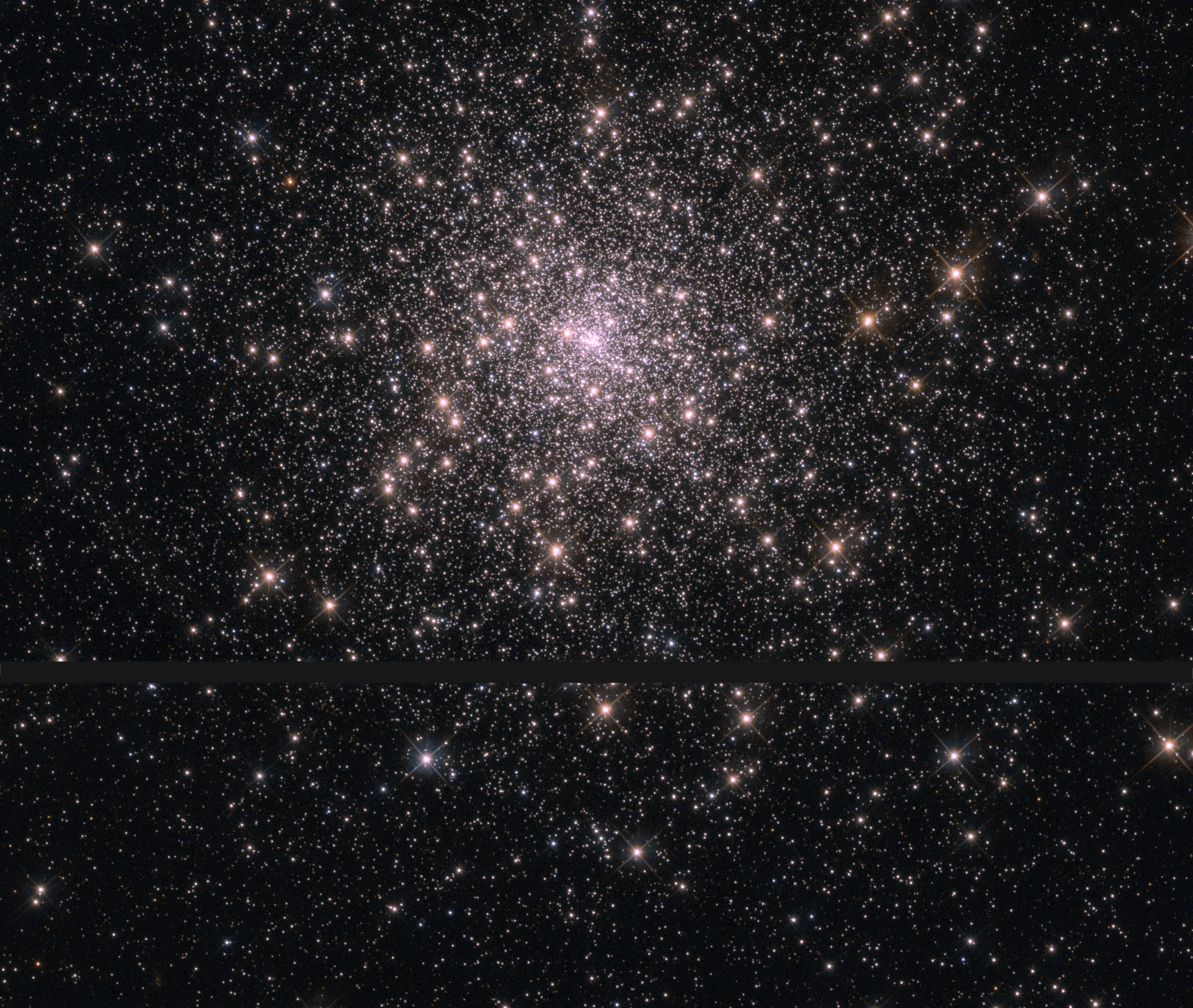
- NGC 6284 as seen through the Hubble Space Telescope

Observation data (J2000 epoch)
- Class: IX
- Constellation: Ophiuchus
- Right ascension: 17^{h} 04^{m} 28.747^{s}
- Declination: −24° 45′ 51.22″
- Distance: 43,000 ly (13,200 pc)
- Apparent magnitude (V): 7.43
- Apparent dimensions (V): 6.2' × 6.2'

Physical characteristics
- Metallicity: [Fe/H] = −1.26 dex
- Estimated age: 13.3~ billion years
- Other designations: GCl 53, 2MASX J17042874-2445512

NGC 6284 is a globular cluster located in the constellation Ophiuchus. It is designated as IX in the galaxy morphological classification scheme and was discovered by the German-born British astronomer William Herschel on 22 May 1784. Its distance had previously been estimated at 49,900 light years from Earth, but this was revised in 2023 to around 43,000 light years. This same study, based on high-resolution Hubble Space Telescope optical observations, produced the first high-quality colour-magnitude diagram (CMD) of NGC 6284, extending down to about six magnitudes below its main sequence turn-off. The new observations moved its centre of gravity by 1.5–3 arcseconds from previous values, and its density profile showed a steep central cusp, suggesting that NGC 6284 is a post-core collapse (PCC) cluster.

The nearby metal-poor star HD 194598 may be a recent runaway from NGC 6284.

== See also ==
- List of NGC objects (6001–7000)
- List of NGC objects
