= NGC 6293 =

Globular cluster in the constellation of Ophiuchus

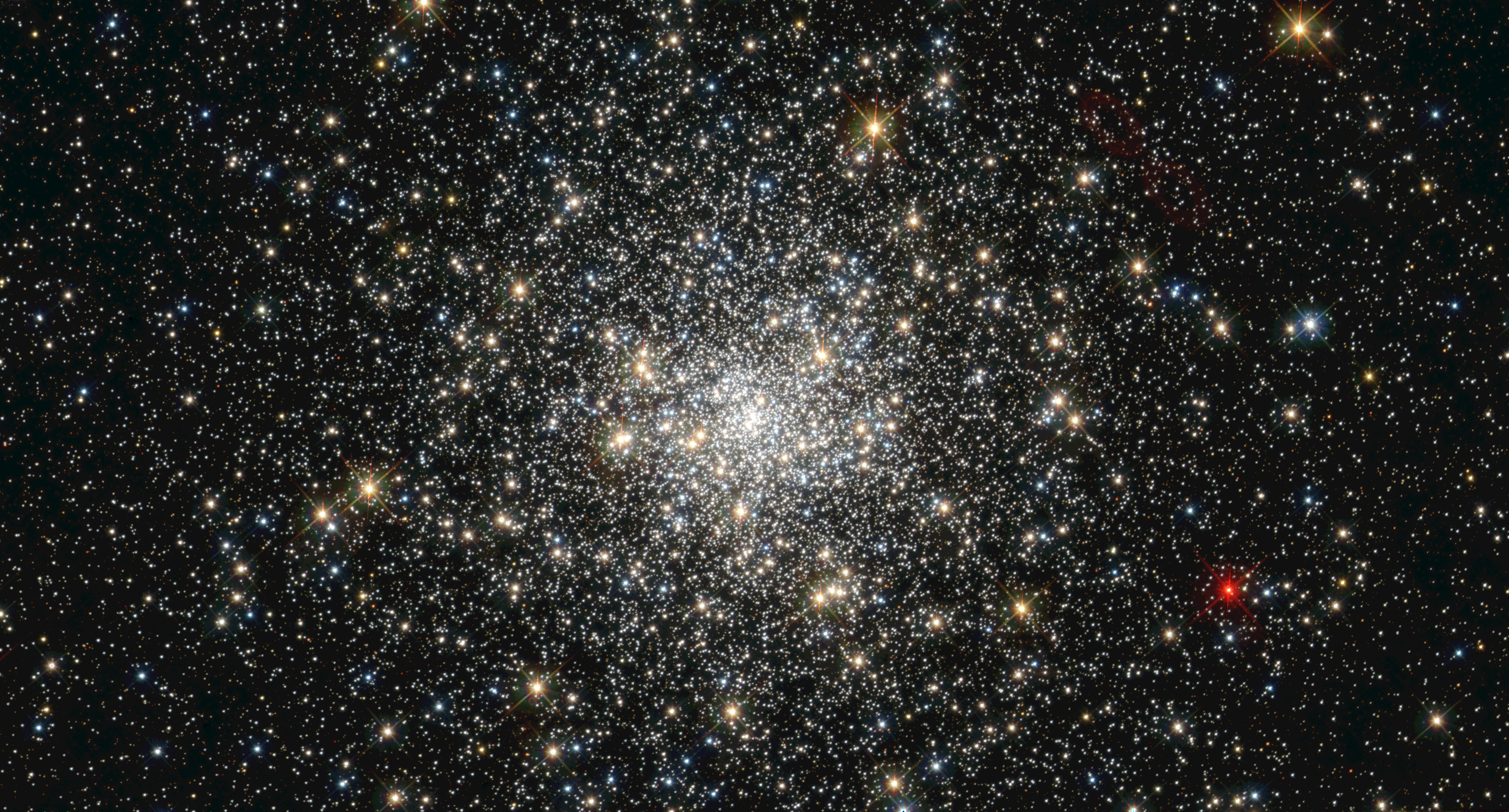
- NGC 6293 as seen through the Hubble Space Telescope

Observation data (J2000 epoch)
- Class: IV
- Constellation: Ophiuchus
- Right ascension: 17^{h} 10^{m} 10.42^{s}
- Declination: −26° 34′ 54.2″
- Distance: 31000 ly (9500 pc)
- Apparent magnitude (V): 9.02
- Apparent dimensions (V): 7.9′ × 7.9′

Physical characteristics
- Metallicity: [Fe/H] = −1.99 dex
- Other designations: GCl 55, VDBH 215

NGC 6293 is a globular cluster located in the constellation Ophiuchus. Its Shapley–Sawyer Concentration Class is IV. William Herschel discovered NGC 6293 on May 24, 1784, cataloging it as Class VI, No. 12 (H VI-12). Early cataloging errors mistakenly credited Lewis Swift with the discovery in 1885, but primary historical records and modern databases officially attribute the find to Herschel. Like many other globular clusters, its distance is not well known; it may be anywhere from 31000 to 52000 light-years away from Earth.

== See also ==
- List of NGC objects (6001–7000)
- List of NGC objects
