= NGC 6101 =

Globular cluster in the constellation Apus

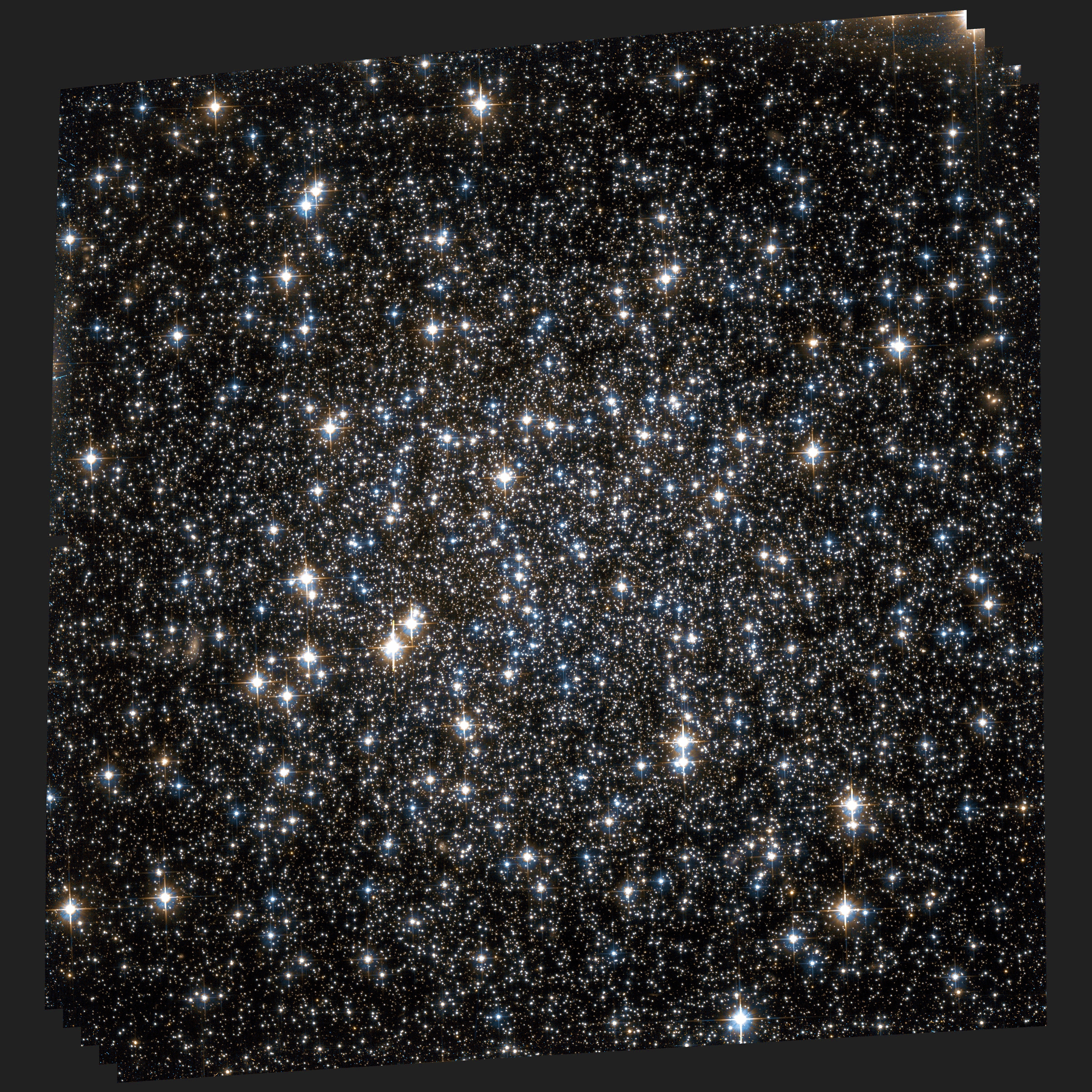
- Hubble Space Telescope image of the central region of NGC 6101

Observation data (J2000 epoch)
- Class: X
- Constellation: Apus
- Right ascension: 16^{h} 25^{m} 48.12^{s}
- Declination: –72° 12′ 07.9″
- Apparent magnitude (V): 9
- Apparent dimensions (V): 10.7'

Physical characteristics
- Metallicity: $\begin{smallmatrix}\left[\ce{Fe}/\ce{H}\right]\end{smallmatrix}$ = –1.76 dex
- Estimated age: 12.54 Gyr
- Other designations: Caldwell 107

NGC 6101 (also known as Caldwell 107) is a globular cluster in the constellation Apus, which was discovered by James Dunlop and catalogued by him as Δ68. It is located at a distance of about 47,600 light-years from the Sun and about 36,500 light-years from the Galactic Center of the Milky Way. It requires a telescope of at least 20 cm (7.9 in) aperture to resolve individual stars. Research revealed this cluster to contain an unexpected large number of black holes.
