= NGC 6569 =

Globular cluster in the constellation of Sagittarius

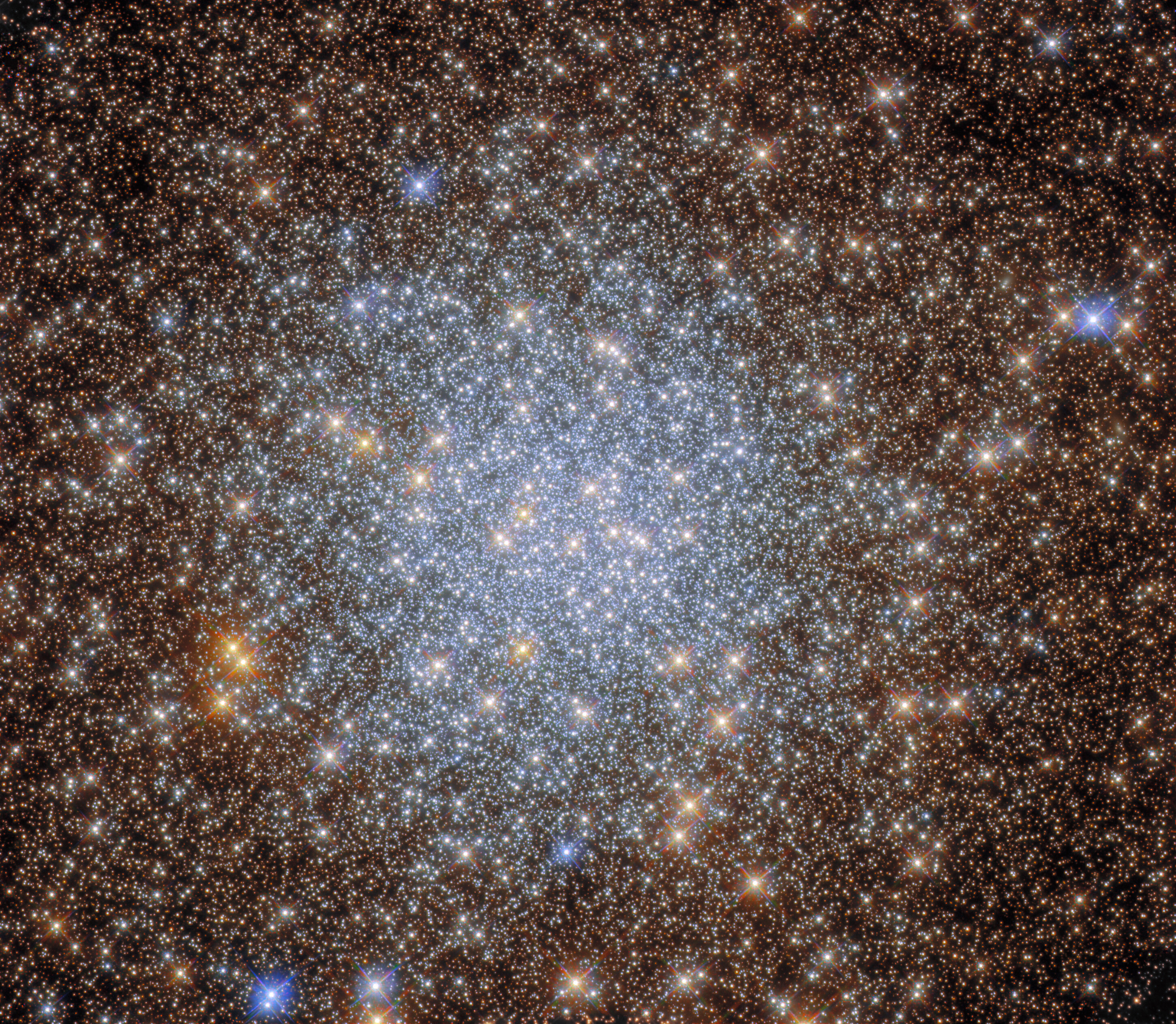
- Hubble Space Telescope image of NGC 6569

Observation data (J2000 epoch)
- Class: VIII
- Constellation: Sagittarius
- Right ascension: 18^{h} 13^{m} 38.88^{s}
- Declination: −31° 49′ 35.2″
- Distance: 35.5 kly (10.9 kpc)
- Apparent magnitude (V): 9.47
- Apparent dimensions (V): 7.0′ × 7.0′

Physical characteristics
- Metallicity: [Fe/H] = −0.76 dex
- Other designations: GCl 91, ESO 456-77, VDBH 260

NGC 6569 is a globular cluster in the constellation Sagittarius. It has an apparent magnitude of about 9.5, and an apparent diameter of 7 arc minutes, and class VIII with stars of magnitude 15 and dimmer. It is about 2 degrees south east of Gamma^{2} Sagittarii. The globular cluster was discovered in 1784 by the astronomer William Herschel with his 18.7-inch telescope and was catalogued later in the New General Catalogue.
