= NGC 6139 =

Globular cluster located in the constellation of Scorpius

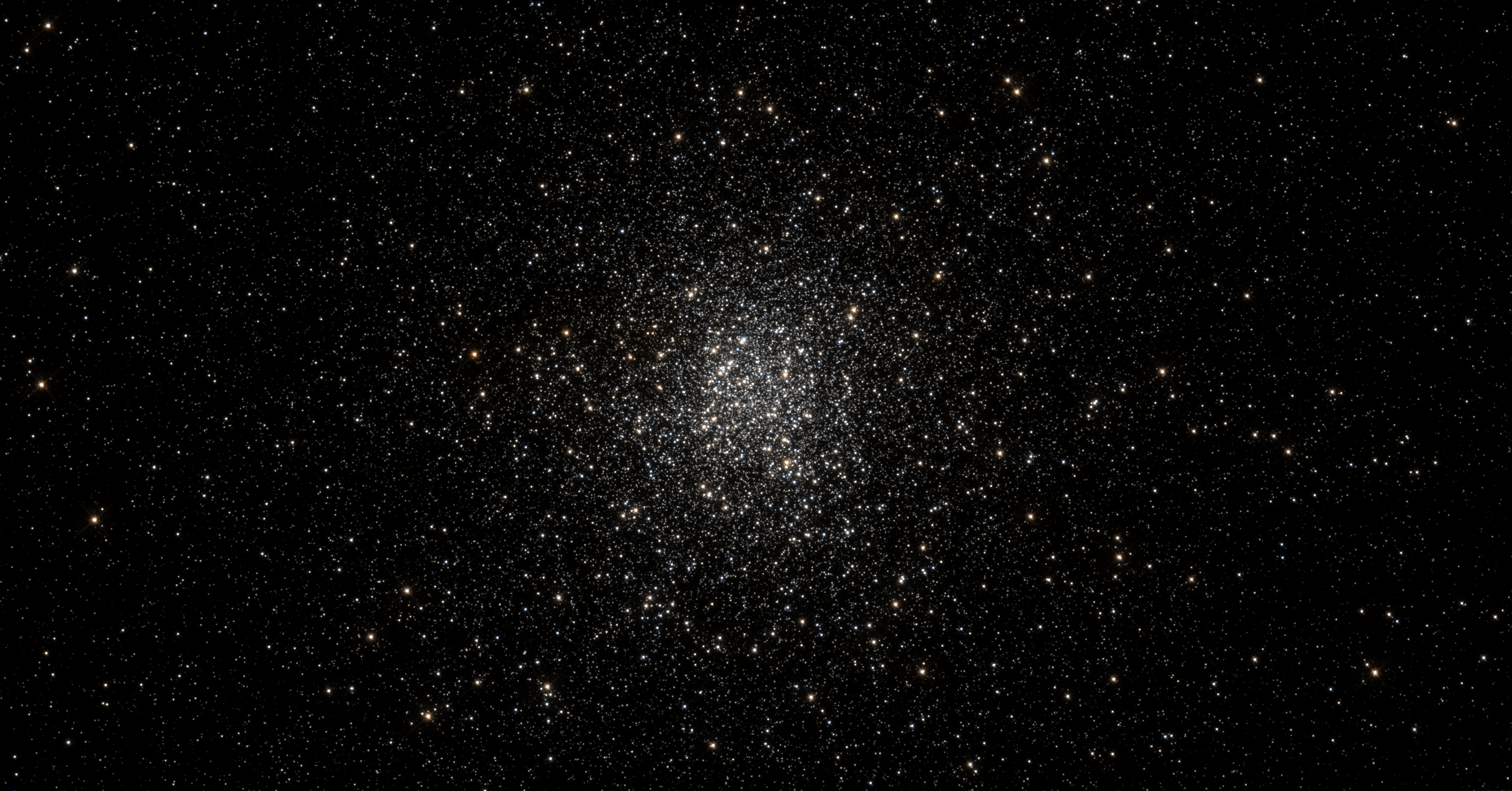
- NGC 6139, imaged by the Hubble Space Telescope

Observation data (J2000 epoch)
- Class: II
- Constellation: Scorpius
- Right ascension: 16^{h} 27^{m} 41.6^{s}
- Declination: –38° 50′ 18″
- Distance: 10.1 kiloparsecs (30 kilolight-years)
- Apparent magnitude (V): +9.68
- Apparent dimensions (V): 1.6′ x 1.4′

Physical characteristics

NGC 6139 is a globular cluster of the Milky Way in the constellation Scorpius. It is located 3.6 kiloparsecs (10 kilolight-years) from the Galactic Center (less than half the distance of the Sun from the Galactic Center). The cluster appears visibly small and requires larger +12" aperture telescopes to view the core. Appearing around 1.5 arcmins having a radius of .75 arcmins, despite its rather bright magnitude.

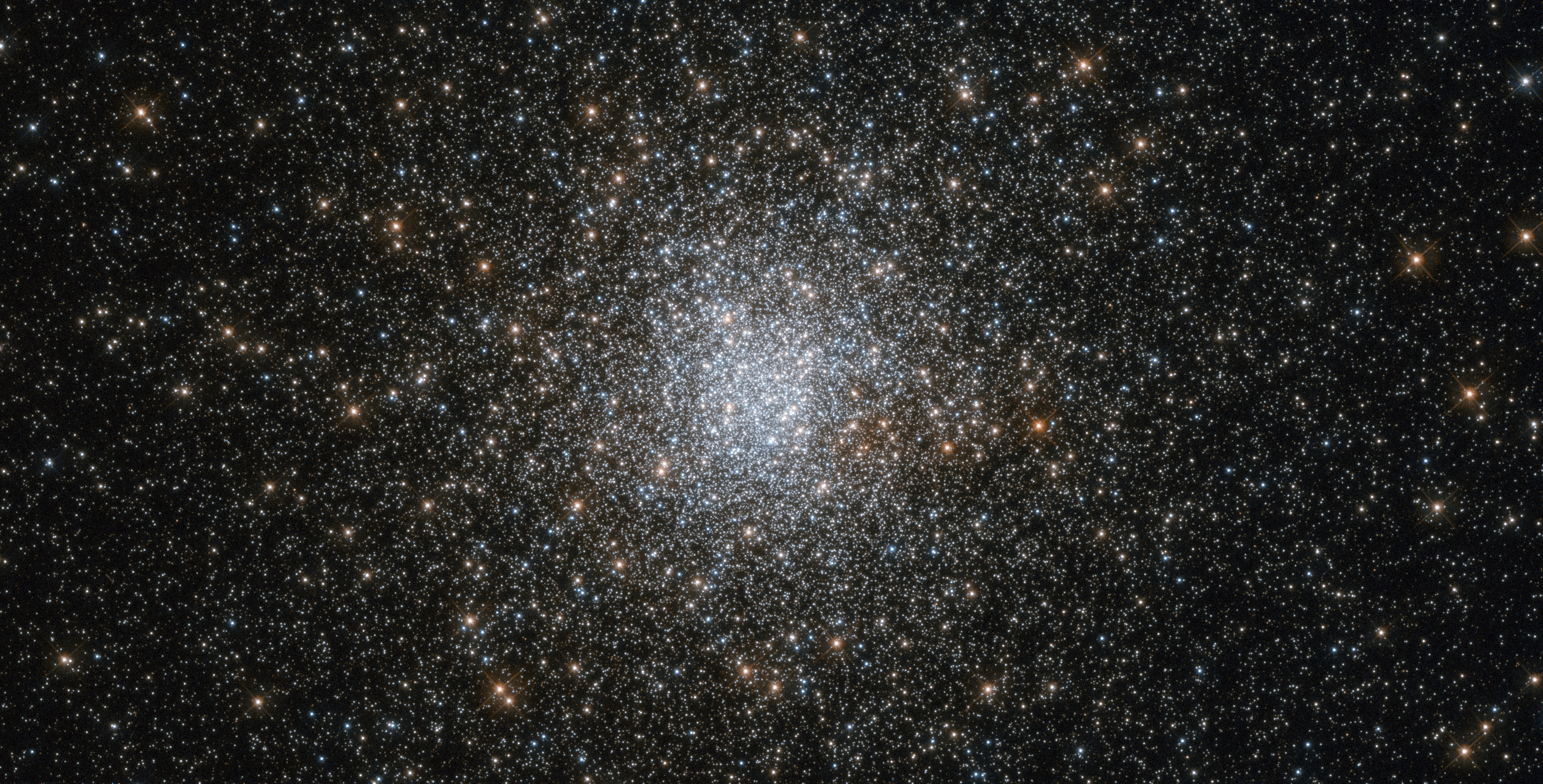
Globular clusters are denser and more spherical than open star clusters.
