= NGC 6352 =

Globular cluster in the constellation Ara

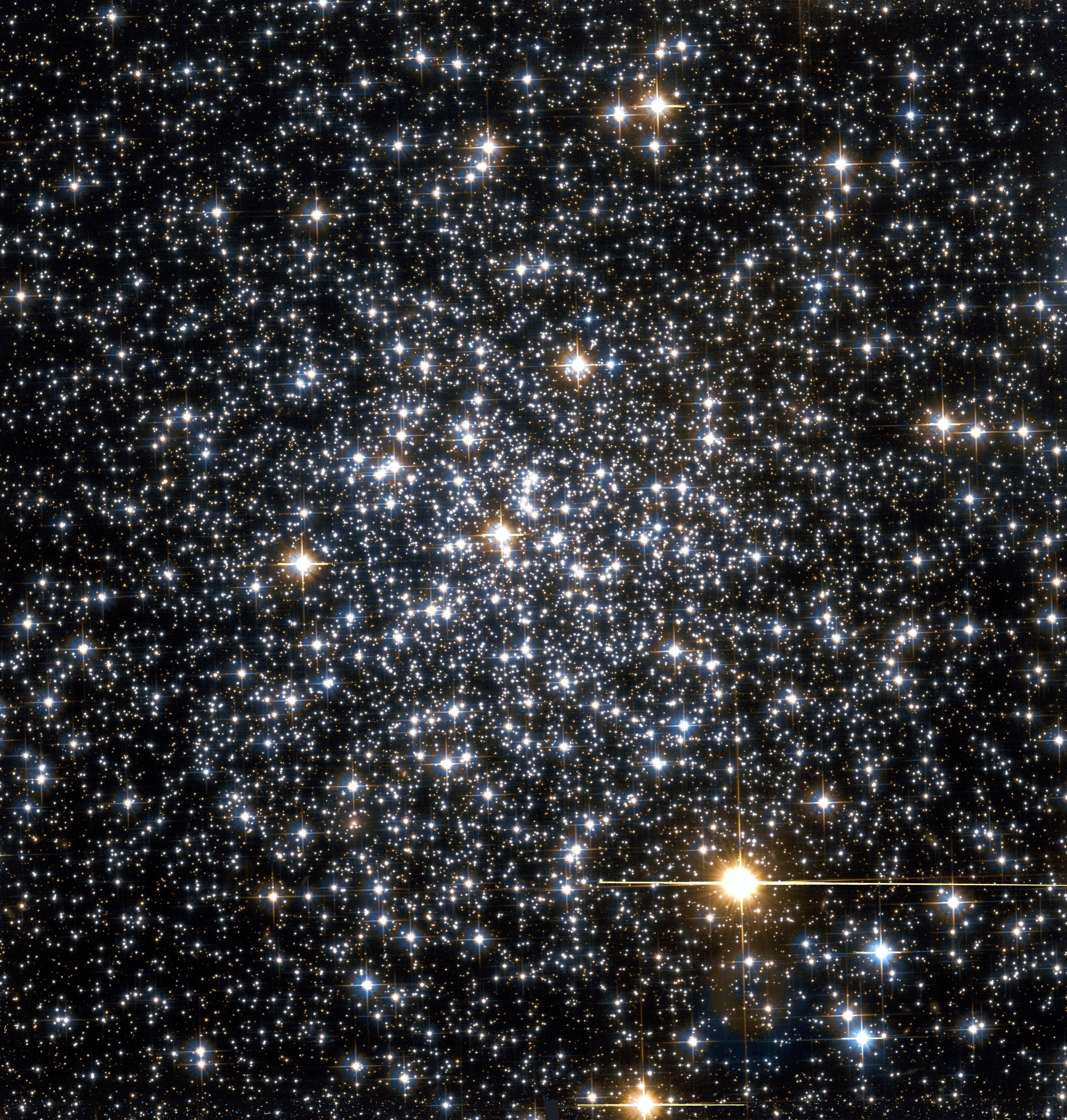

Observation data (J2000 epoch)
- Class: XI:
- Constellation: Ara
- Right ascension: 17^{h} 25^{m} 29.11^{s}
- Declination: –48° 25′ 19.8″
- Distance: 18.3 kly (5.6 kpc)
- Apparent magnitude (V): +7.8
- Apparent dimensions (V): 7.1′

Physical characteristics
- Mass: 3.7×10^{4} M_{☉}
- Tidal radius: 10.5″
- Metallicity: [Fe/H] = –0.70 dex
- Estimated age: 12.67 Gyr
- Other designations: Caldwell 81, Cr 328, NGC 6352

NGC 6352 (also known as Caldwell 81) is a globular cluster of stars in the southern constellation of Ara, located approximately 18.3 kly from the Sun. It was discovered by Scottish astronomer James Dunlop on May 14, 1826. The cluster has a Shapley–Sawyer Concentration Class of XI:. A telescope with a 15 cm (5.9 in) aperture is required to resolve the stars within this loose cluster.

This cluster is about 12.67 billion years old with two distinct stellar populations; the second generation is only around 10 million years younger than the first. It lies approximately 13 kly (4 kpc) from the Galactic Center and 1.6 kly (0.5 kpc) from the galactic plane. The orbital motion of this cluster through the Milky Way suggests it is a member of the bulge or disk population. It is relatively metal-rich for an object of this class, having a metallicity of –0.70. The core radius is 49.8″ and the tidal radius is 10.5″.
