= NGC 6445 =

Planetary nebula in the constellation Sagittarius

Emission nebula
- Planetary nebula
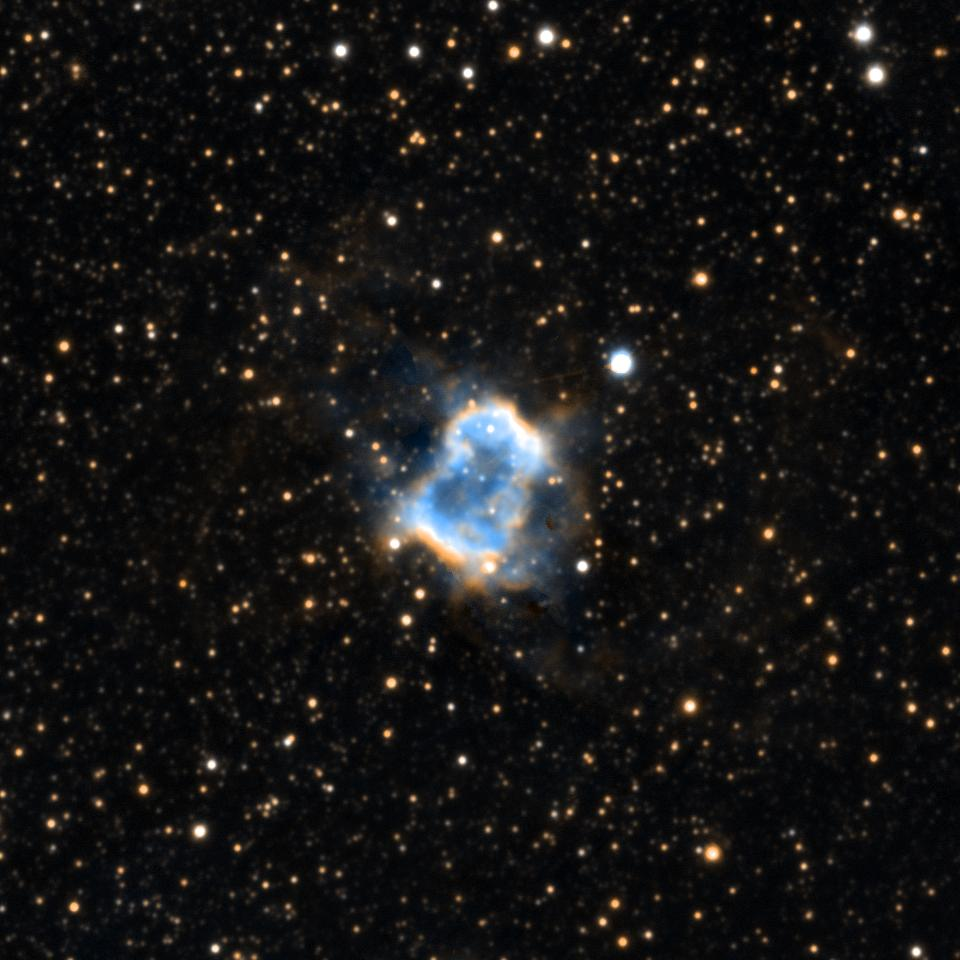
- NGC 6445 by PanSTARRS

Observation data: J2000 epoch
- Right ascension: 17^{h} 49^{m} 15^{s}
- Declination: −20° 00′ 35″
- Distance: 4.5 Kly (1.38 Kpc) ly
- Apparent magnitude (V): 11.2
- Apparent dimensions (V): 0.53′ × 0.53′
- Constellation: Sagittarius
- Designations: PK 008+03 1, Little Gem Nebula, Box Nebula

NGC 6445, also known as the Little Gem Nebula or Box Nebula, is a planetary nebula in the constellation Sagittarius. It was discovered by William Herschel on May 28, 1786. The distance of NGC 6445 is estimated to be slightly more than 1,000 parsecs based on the parallax measured by Gaia, which was measured at 0.9740±0.3151 mas.

== Characteristics ==
NGC 6445 has been classified as a bipolar planetary nebula. Its He/H and N/O abundance ratios are consistent with the Type I definition. In optical images, NGC 6445 features a bright, central ring-shaped morphology and open bipolar lobes; the outer envelope emission of NGC 6445 is [NII]-dominant. Wide-field optical images obtained by the Nordic Optical Telescope (NOT) Andalucía Faint Object Spectrograph and Camera (ALFOSC) show that NGC 6445 has an irregularly shaped central region with a size of ~40"×50", where the [OIII] emission dominates, while the [NII] emission is much more extended and defines an overall bipolar morphology. At distance, NGC 6445 is 4 light years across and is among the largest known.

== Observation ==
NGC 6445 lies 2.1° southwest from the open cluster Messier 23. NGC 6445 can be located by star hopping from Messier 23, by firstly locating an arc of 7th and 8th magnitude stars one degree southwest of M23, with the nebula lying 5 arcminutes west of an 8th magnitude star that lies 40 arcminutes west of the southernmost star of the arc. The globular cluster NGC 6440 lies 23 arcminutes to the south and both objects can be seen in a wide field eyepiece. In low magnification the nebula appears like a fuzzy star and higher magnifications reveal its rectangular disk. The planetary nebula is included in the Herschel 400 Catalogue.
