= NGC 6287 =

Globular cluster in the constellation Ophiuchus

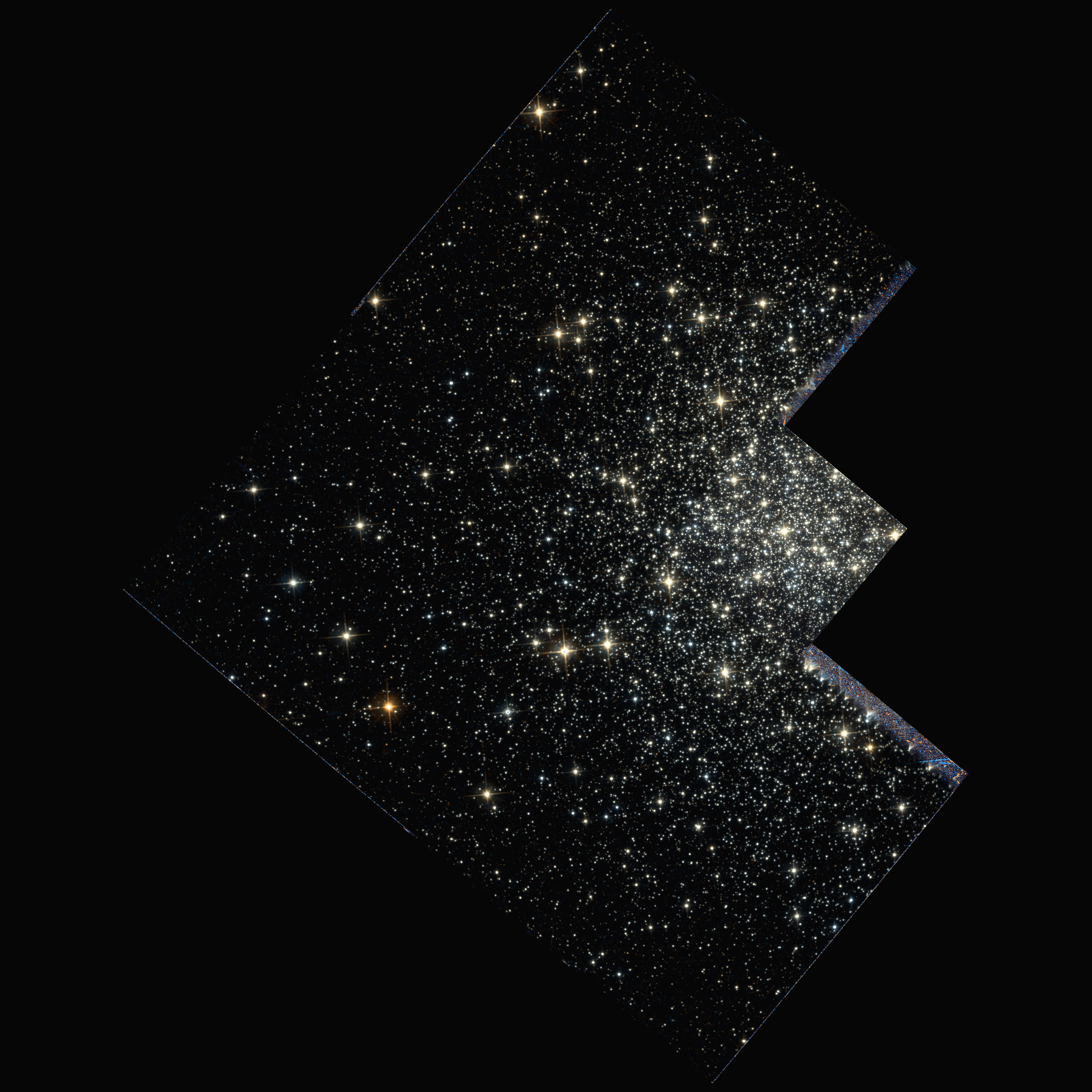
- NGC 6287 as seen through the Hubble Space Telescope

Observation data (J2000 epoch)
- Class: VII
- Constellation: Ophiuchus
- Right ascension: 17^{h} 05^{m} 19.3^{s}
- Declination: −22° 42′ 29″
- Apparent magnitude (V): 9.3
- Apparent dimensions (V): 4.80'

Physical characteristics
- Absolute magnitude: −7.36
- Other designations: GCL 54 and ESO 518-SC10

NGC 6287 is a globular cluster located in the constellation Ophiuchus. It is designated as VII in the galaxy morphological classification scheme and was discovered by the German-born British astronomer William Herschel on 21 May 1784. It is at a distance of 30,300 light years away from Earth.

== See also ==
- List of NGC objects (6001–7000)
- List of NGC objects
