= NGC 6638 =

Globular cluster in the constellation Sagittarius

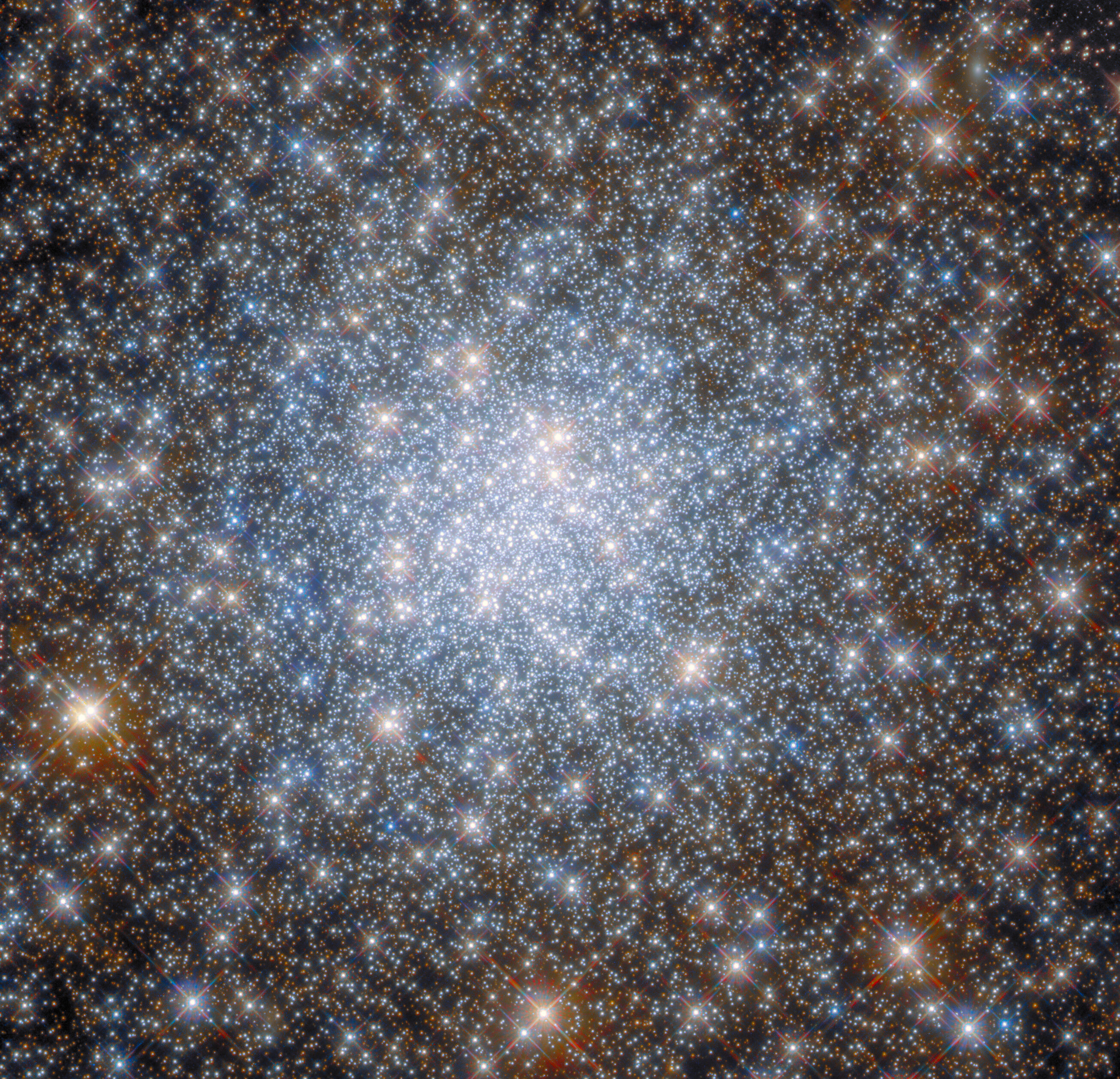

Observation data (J2000 epoch)
- Class: VI
- Constellation: Sagittarius
- Right ascension: 18^{h} 30^{m} 56.2^{s}
- Declination: −25° 29′ 45″
- Distance: 31.3 ± 1.6 kly (9.6 ± 0.5 kpc)
- Apparent magnitude (V): 9.5
- Apparent dimensions (V): 2′

Physical characteristics
- Mass: 1.89×10^{5} M_{☉}
- Other designations: GCl 95, C 1827-255

NGC 6638 is a globular cluster in the constellation Sagittarius. It is magnitude 9.5 and diameter 2 arc minutes, class VI. It is a half degree east of Lambda Sagittarii. It is a member of the Milky Way.

The globular cluster was discovered in 1784 by the astronomer William Herschel with his 18.7-inch telescope and the discovery was later entered in the New General Catalogue.
