= NGC 6304 =

Globular cluster in the constellation Ophiuchus

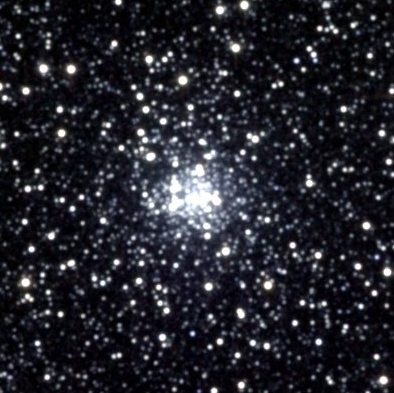

Observation data (J2000.0 epoch)
- Class: VI
- Constellation: Ophiuchus
- Right ascension: 17^{h} 14^{m} 32.25^{s}
- Declination: −29° 27′ 43.3″
- Distance: 19.2 kly
- Apparent magnitude (V): 9.03
- Apparent dimensions (V): 3.8'

Physical characteristics
- V_{HB}: 16.25
- Metallicity: [Fe/H] = −0.45 dex
- Estimated age: ~12.3 Gyr
- Other designations: Bennett 90, C 1711-294, ESO 454-2, ESO 454-SC 002, GC 4275, GCl 56, h 3670, I 147, NGC 6304, VDBH 216

NGC 6304 is a globular cluster in the constellation Ophiuchus. William Herschel discovered this star cluster using an 18.5-inch (47 cm) f/13 speculum reflector telescope in 1786. It is about 19,000 light-years away, near the Milky Way's central bulge.

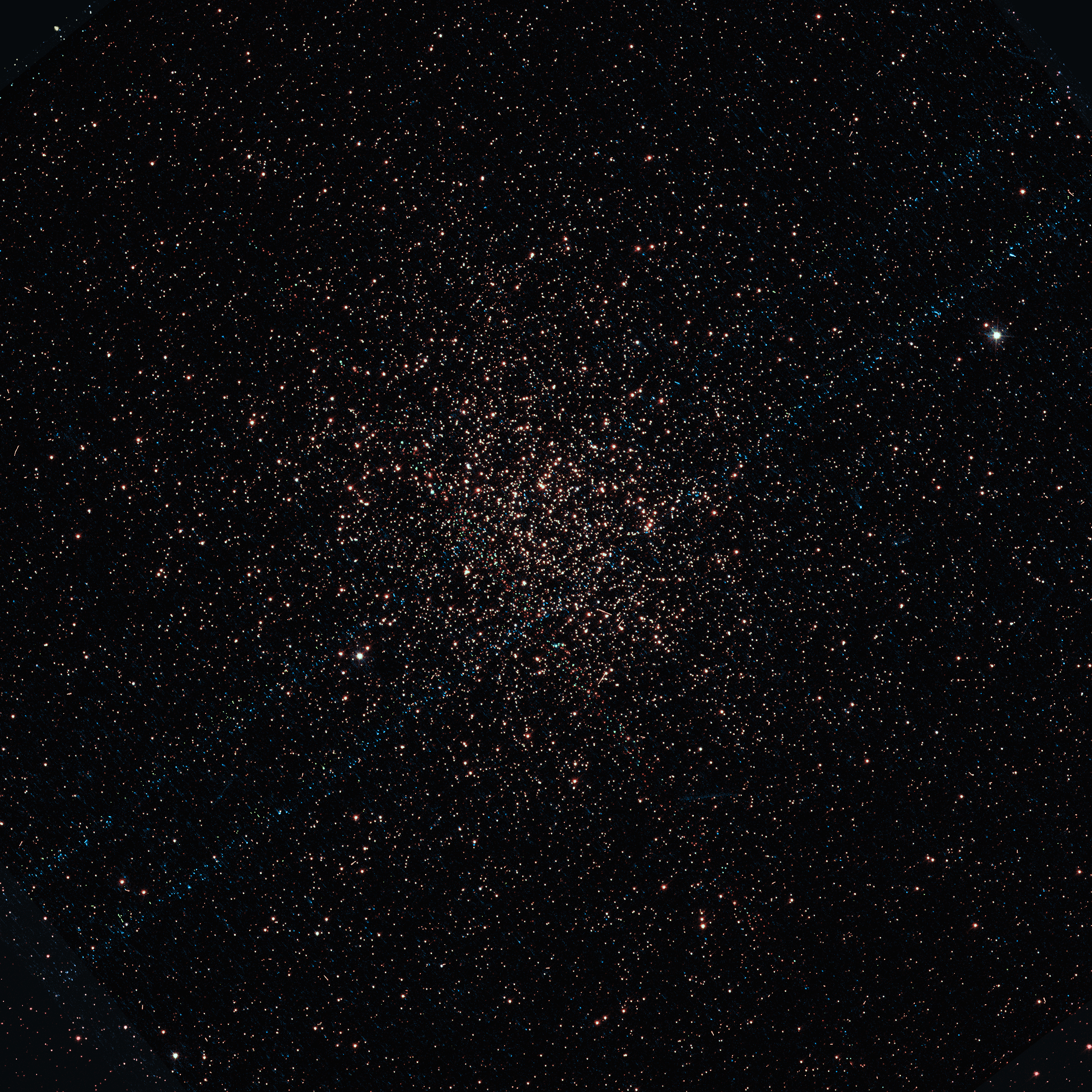
Globular cluster NGC 6304, by HST (WFC3).

== See also ==
- NGC object
  - List of NGC objects
    - List of NGC objects (6001–7000)
