= NGC 1783 =

Globular cluster in the constellation Dorado

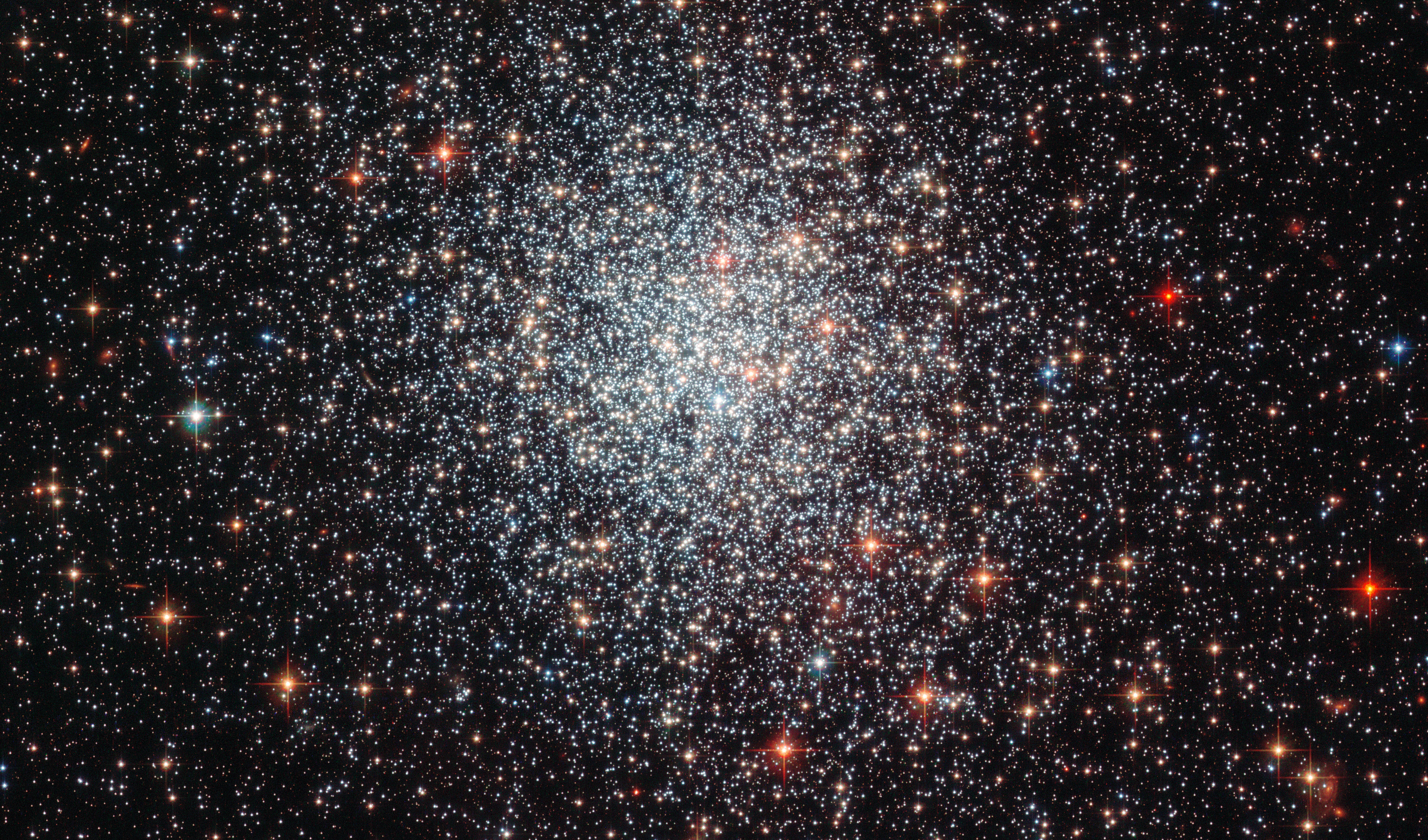
- Hubble Space Telescope image of NGC 1783

Observation data (J2000 epoch)
- Constellation: Dorado
- Right ascension: 04^{h} 59^{m} 08.6^{s}
- Declination: −65° 59′ 15.8″
- Distance: 160 Kly (49 kpc)
- Apparent magnitude (V): 10.93
- Apparent dimensions (V): 5.3′ × 4.7′

Physical characteristics
- Mass: 9.8×10^{4} M_{☉}
- Estimated age: 1.70±0.05 Gyr
- Other designations: ESO 85-SC29

NGC 1783 (also known as ESO 85-SC29) is a globular cluster within the constellation Dorado and is part of the Large Magellanic Cloud, a satellite dwarf galaxy of the Milky Way. At an aperture of 50 arcseconds, its apparent V-band magnitude is 10.39, making it one of the brightest globular clusters in the LMC as viewed from Earth. It was discovered in 1835 by John Herschel. The compiler of the New General Catalogue, John Louis Emil Dreyer, described this cluster as "considerably bright, large, round, very gradually pretty much brighter middle, mottled but not resolved."

NGC 1783 is about 1.7 billion years old. Its estimated mass is 9.8×10^{4} M_{☉}, and its total luminosity is 3.77×10^{5} L_{☉}, leading to a mass-to-luminosity ratio of 0.26 M_{☉}/L_{☉}. All else equal, older star clusters have higher mass-to-luminosity ratios; that is, they have lower luminosities for the same mass.
