= NGC 1818 =

Globular cluster in the constellation Dorado

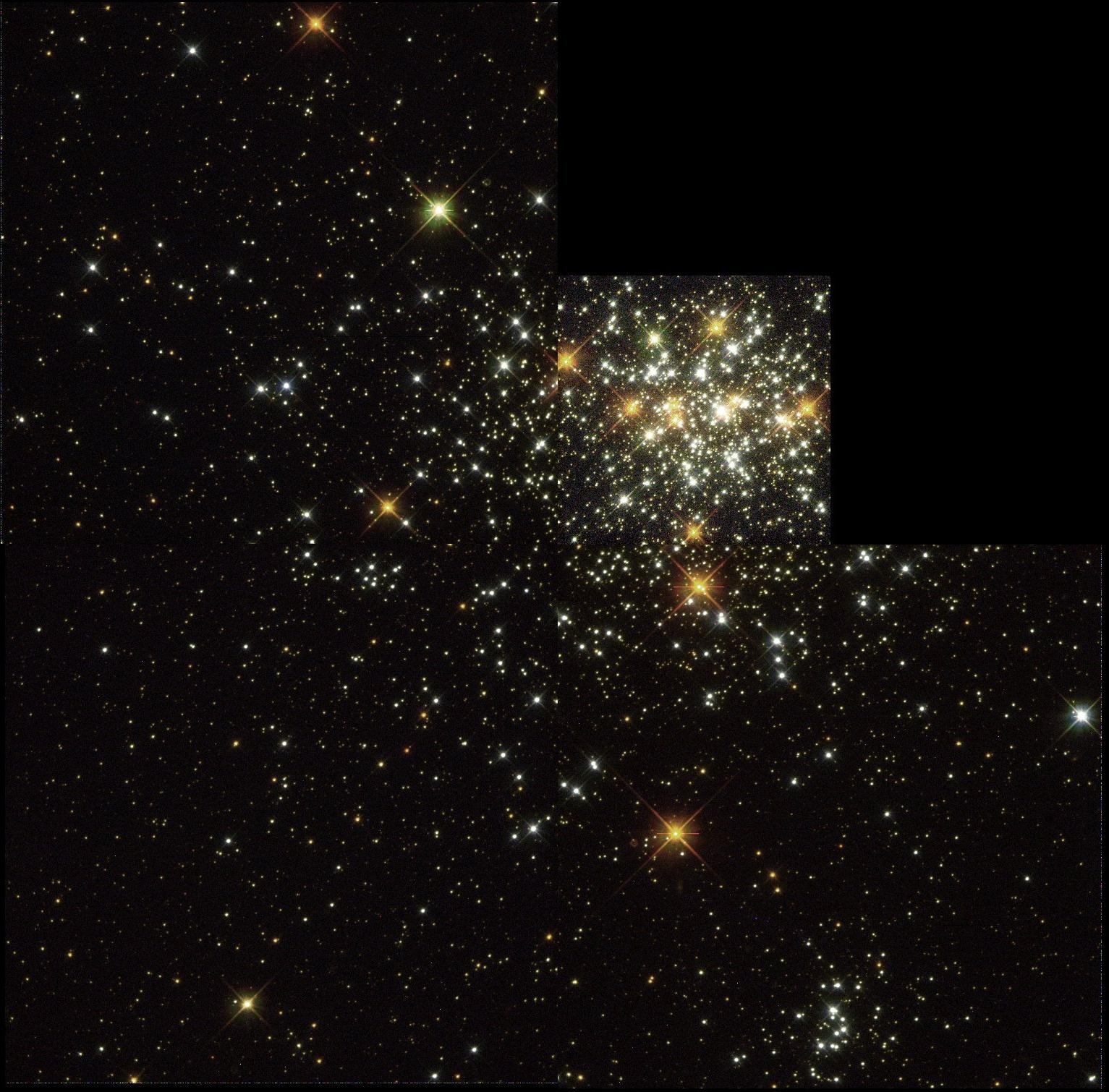
- A Hubble Space Telescope (HST) image of NGC 1818

Observation data (J2000 epoch)
- Constellation: Dorado
- Right ascension: 05^{h} 04^{m} 13.300^{s}
- Declination: −66° 26′ 05.47″
- Distance: ~164 kly (50 kpc)
- Apparent magnitude (V): 9.7 (B band)

Physical characteristics
- Absolute magnitude: −8.8
- Mass: 13,500+5,600 −3,700 M_{☉}
- Estimated age: 30 or 40 Myr
- Notable features: Rare young globular

NGC 1818 is a young globular cluster in the north-west part of the Large Magellanic Cloud, about 3.2 kpc from the center. It was discovered by Scottish astronomer James Dunlop in 1826, and has since been well studied.

The cluster has an estimated core radius of 2.67 pc and a 90% light radius of 13.83 pc, with a combined mass of around 13,500 times the mass of the Sun. Age estimates for the cluster range from 25 to 40 million years. Given this, most stars with a mass equal to the Sun or less are still on the pre-main-sequence. The average stellar metallicity – what astronomers term the abundance of elements with higher atomic number than helium – is −0.4, or about 10^{−0.4} ≈ 40% of the abundance in the Sun.

There appear to be two distinct stellar populations in the cluster with the more blue (hotter) stars showing slower rotation rates than the redder (cooler) stars. The frequency of binary star systems in the cluster increases with distance from the core, which is the opposite of the normal trend for globular clusters. This may be explained by interactions with other stars in the denser core disrupting binary systems, before mass segregation of the cluster has begun to take effect. The cluster contains few if any blue stragglers, which are the result of stellar mergers.
