= NGC 2506 =

Open cluster in the constellation Monoceros

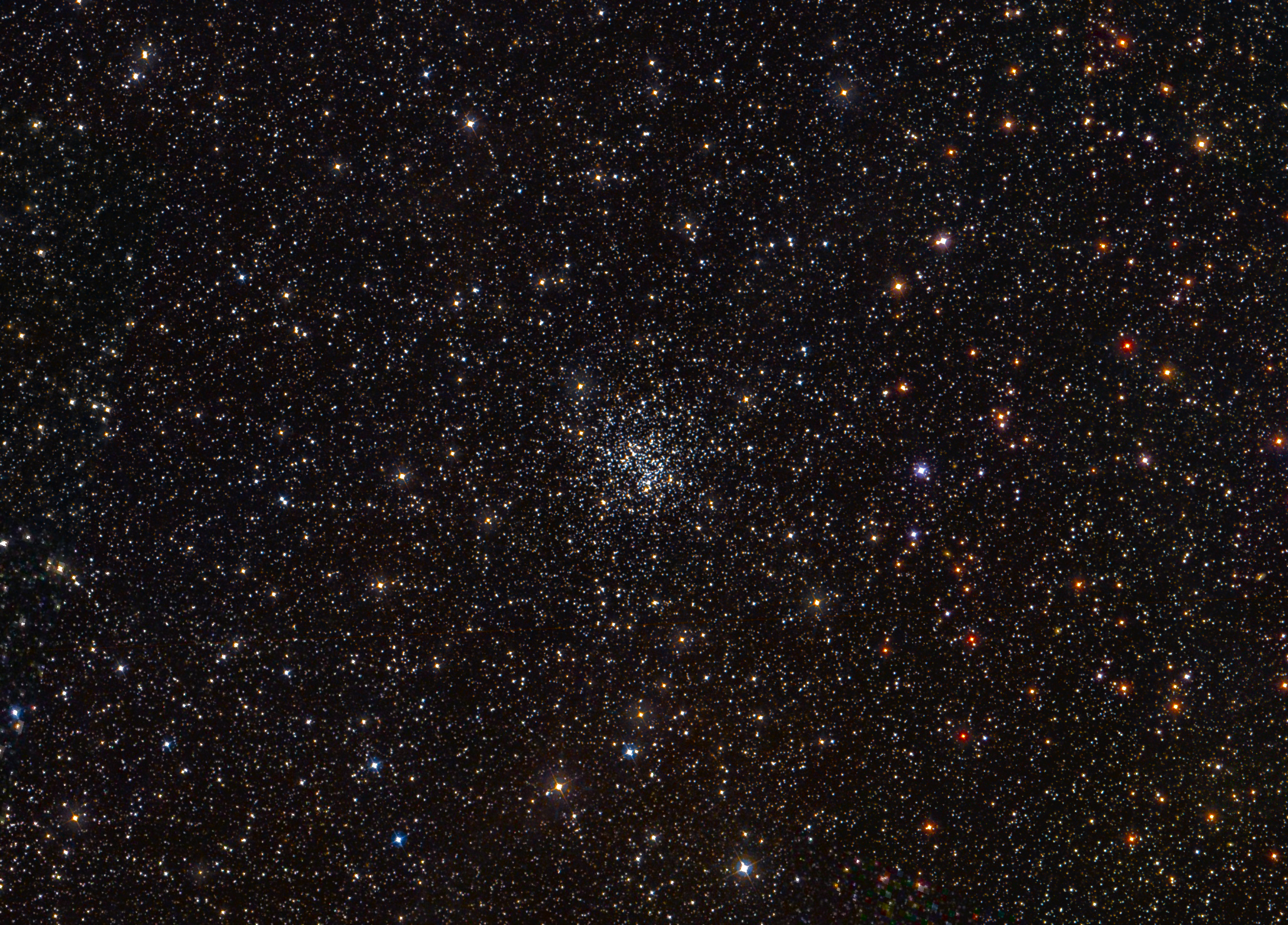
- A composite image of NGC 2506 from multiple astronomical surveys

Observation data (J2000 epoch)
- Right ascension: 08^{h} 00^{m} 01.0^{s}
- Declination: −10° 46′ 12″
- Distance: 12.7 ± 1.4 kly (3.88 ± 0.42 kpc)
- Apparent magnitude (V): 7.6
- Apparent dimensions (V): 12′

Physical characteristics
- Radius: 18.5 ly
- Estimated age: 2.09±0.14 Gyr
- Other designations: Caldwell 54, Cr 170, Mel 80

Associations
- Constellation: Monoceros

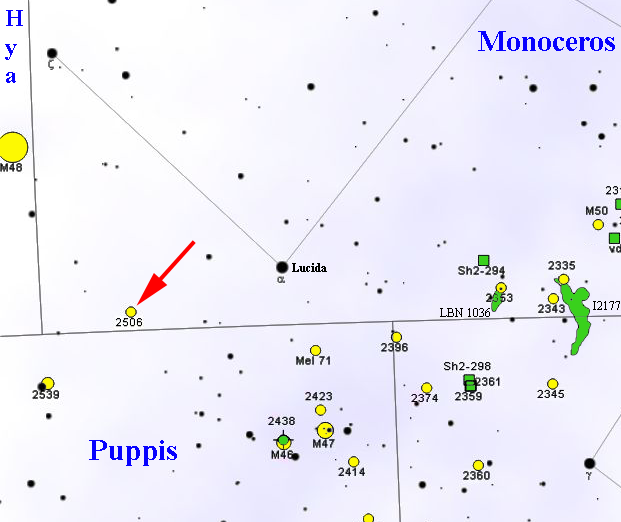
Map showing the location of NGC 2506

NGC 2506 (also known as Caldwell 54) is a mildly-elongated open cluster of stars in the equatorial constellation of Monoceros, located at a distance of 12.7 kly from the Sun near the Galactic anti-center. It was discovered by William Herschel in 1791. The cluster lies around 10,000 ly from the Galactic Center and about 1,600 ly above the Galactic plane. It is of intermediate age, estimated at around two billion years. The cluster has an angular radius of 12′ and a core radius of 4.8′.

At least 94 probable members have been identified within the field of NGC 2506 based upon their radial velocities. Compared to the Sun, the cluster is moderately metal-poor with an iron abundance of [Fe/H] = –0.3 dex. It shows indications of mass segregation, with the lower mass members being more likely to be in the outer parts of the cluster. This is the result of exchange of kinetic energy during encounters between the members. Twelve blue straggler stars have been located in the cluster, with three of them showing short-period oscillation. Fourteen Gamma Doradus variables have been found, as well as two detached eclipsing binaries, and three Delta Scuti stars.
