= NGC 6818 =

Planetary nebula in the constellation Sagittarius

Emission nebula
- Planetary nebula
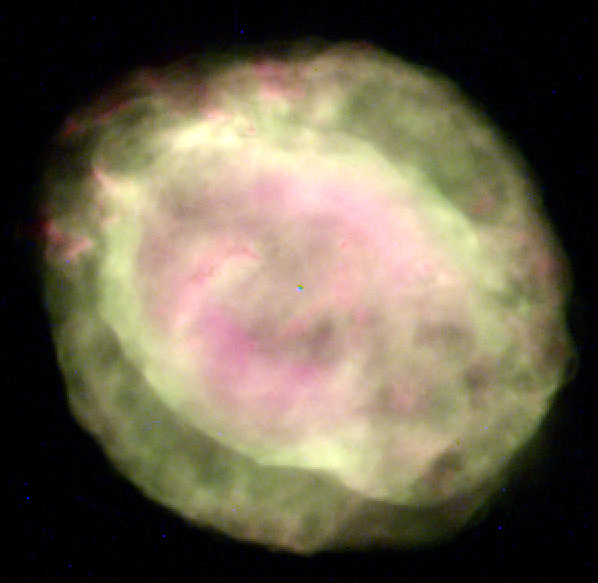
- A Hubble Space Telescope (HST) image of NGC 6818. Credit: HST/NASA/ESA.

Observation data: J2000 epoch
- Right ascension: 19^{h} 43^{m} 57.8^{s}
- Declination: −14° 9′ 11.9″
- Apparent magnitude (V): 10
- Apparent dimensions (V): 22" x 15"
- Constellation: Sagittarius

Physical characteristics
- Radius: 0.32 ly
- Designations: PK 25-17.1, HD 186282, GCRV 12096, BD-14 5523

The Little Gem Nebula, also known as NGC 6818 or the Green Mars Nebula, is a planetary nebula located in the constellation of Sagittarius. It has magnitude 10 and oval diameter of 15 to 22 arcseconds with a 15th magnitude central star.

It was discovered by William Herschel in 1787.

NGC 6818 is located in the constellation of Sagittarius (The Archer), roughly 6000 light-years away from Earth. The glow of the cloud is just over half a light-year across.

When stars like the Sun are near end of life, they send their outer layers into space to create glowing clouds of gas, a planetary nebulae. This ejection of mass is uneven, and planetary nebulae can have complex shapes. NGC 6818 shows knotty filament-like structures and distinct layers of material, with a bright and enclosed central bubble surrounded by a larger, more diffuse cloud.

Scientists believe that the stellar wind from the central star propels the outflowing material, forming the elongated shape of NGC 6818. As this stellar wind moves through the slower-moving cloud it creates particularly bright spots in the bubble's outer layers.

== Gallery ==
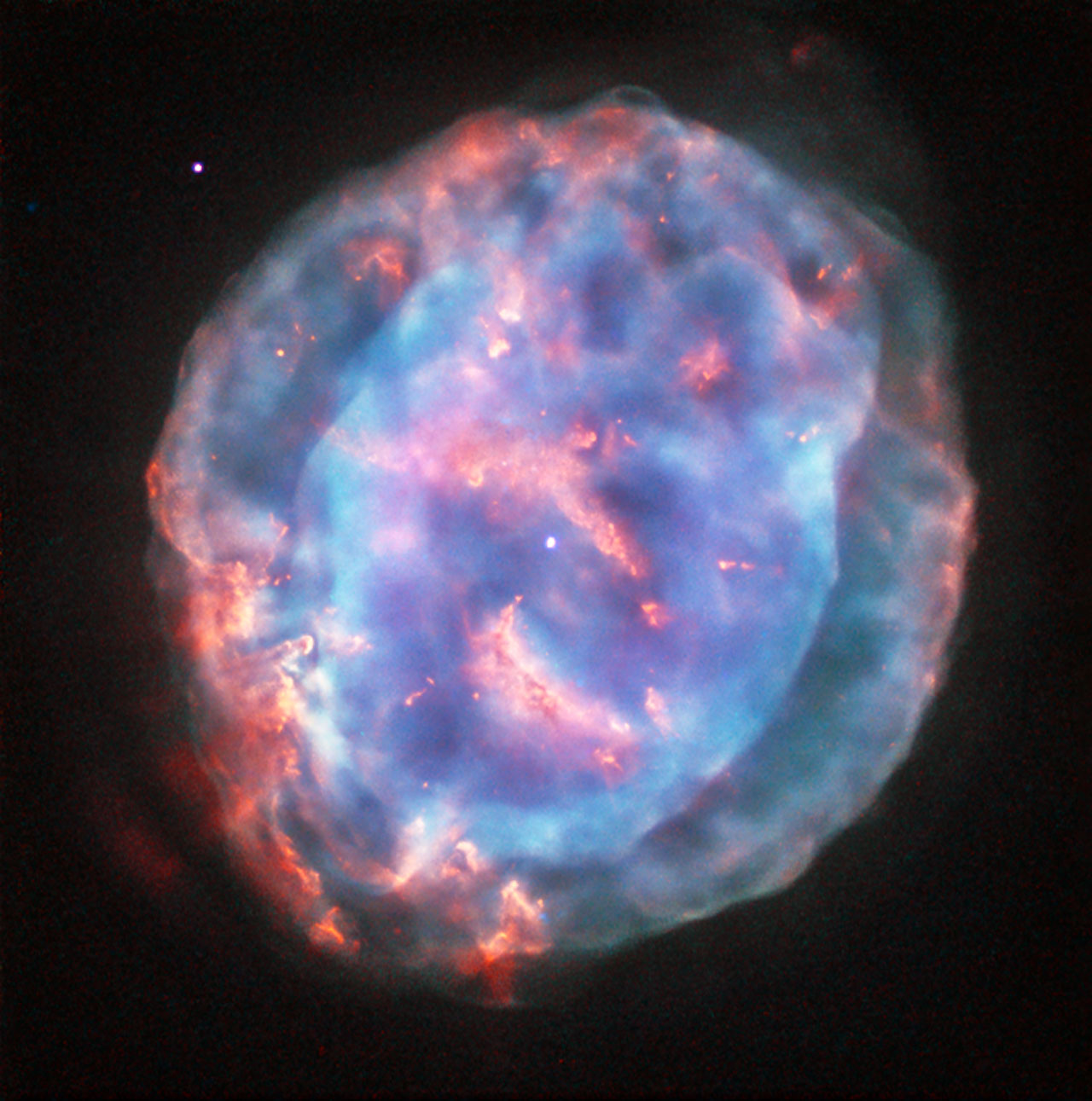
Stellar wind from the central star propels the outflowing material.

== See also ==
- List of NGC objects
- Planetary nebula
