= NGC 1535 =

Planetary nebula in the constellation of Eridanus

Emission nebula
- Planetary nebula
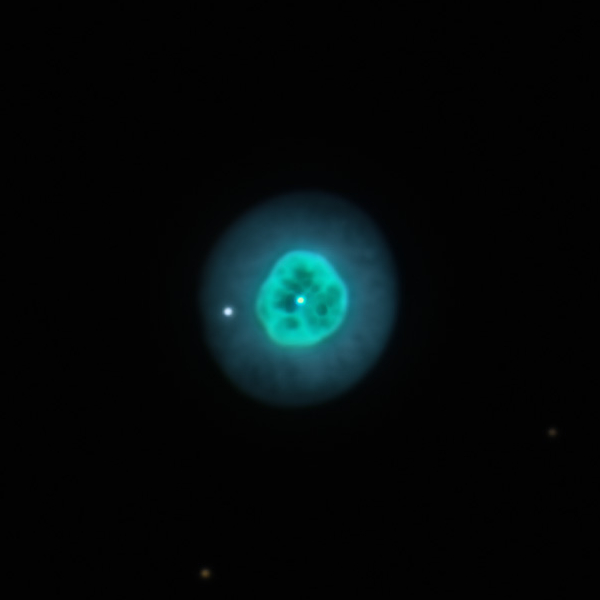
- NGC 1535 using the 0.8m Schulman Telescope from the Mount Lemmon SkyCenter

Observation data: J2000 epoch
- Right ascension: 04^{h} 14^{m} 15.782^{s}
- Declination: −12° 44′ 21.68″
- Distance: 5500–7500 ly (1740–2310 pc)
- Apparent magnitude (V): 9.6
- Apparent dimensions (V): 20″
- Constellation: Eridanus
- Designations: 2MASX J04141578-1244216, IRAS 04119-1251, PN G 206.4-40.5, PK 206-40.1, dML87 112, UITBOC 627, VERA J0414-1244

NGC 1535, also known as the Ghost of Neptune, Ghost of Neptune Nebula, or Celestial Jellyfish Nebula is a planetary nebula in the equatorial constellation of Eridanus. It is known as Cleopatra's Eye, and is located around 5500-7500 light years away from Earth. This nebula was discovered by German-British astronomer William Herschel on February 1, 1785. The object is included in the Astronomical League's Herschel 400 Observing Program.

== Characteristics ==
It is very similar to the Eskimo Nebula in both color and structure. It has a round exhibiting moderate ellipticity. The dust distribution inside NGC 1535 is uniform and nearly round in shape. It displays a dust halo with a noticeable inner ring of increased intensity. Outside this ring is a faint oval disk, note quite symmetrical with the main nebula. This region shows faint traces of ring formation in the southeastern region. The nebula seems to have formed in a somewhat metal-poor region having undergone little or no enhancement of elements mixing with nuclear-processed material.

NGC 1536 is a bright, high-excitatory nebula. Spectra of NGC 1535 from ROSAT reveal of “double hump” shape with approximately one-third of the photons are within the high energy range with more than 0.5 keV. These high energies could not simply have been produced by a stellar photosphere, even with the central star having a temperature of 250,000 Kelvin.

Observations by Leahy et al. using ROSAT reported X-ray emissions from NGC 3587 and NGC 1535. However comparisons between optical and X-ray images shows that these X-ray emissions coincide with a star that was outside the optical boundary of the nebula. This would make previous reports of X-ray emission from NGC 1535 likely false. Observations were taken using ROSAT High Resolution Imager which clearly confirms that the X-ray emissions contain three peaks that are point sources (RX J111447.9+550106, RX J111450.9+550208, and RX J111504.9+550141). Only the first of these sources are projected to be from the central star.

=== Central star ===
At the center of NGC 1535, there is a O-type star with a spectral type of O(H)5. It is difficult to visually observe with a magnitude of 10. This star has a mass of 0.59_{☉} and a temperature of 66,000 Kelvin. The star produces stellar winds with a terminal velocity of about 200 km/sec. These stellar winds are suspected to be the dominant force, shaping the morphology of the nebula to a round shape.
