= NGC 6440 =

Globular cluster in the constellation of Sagittarius

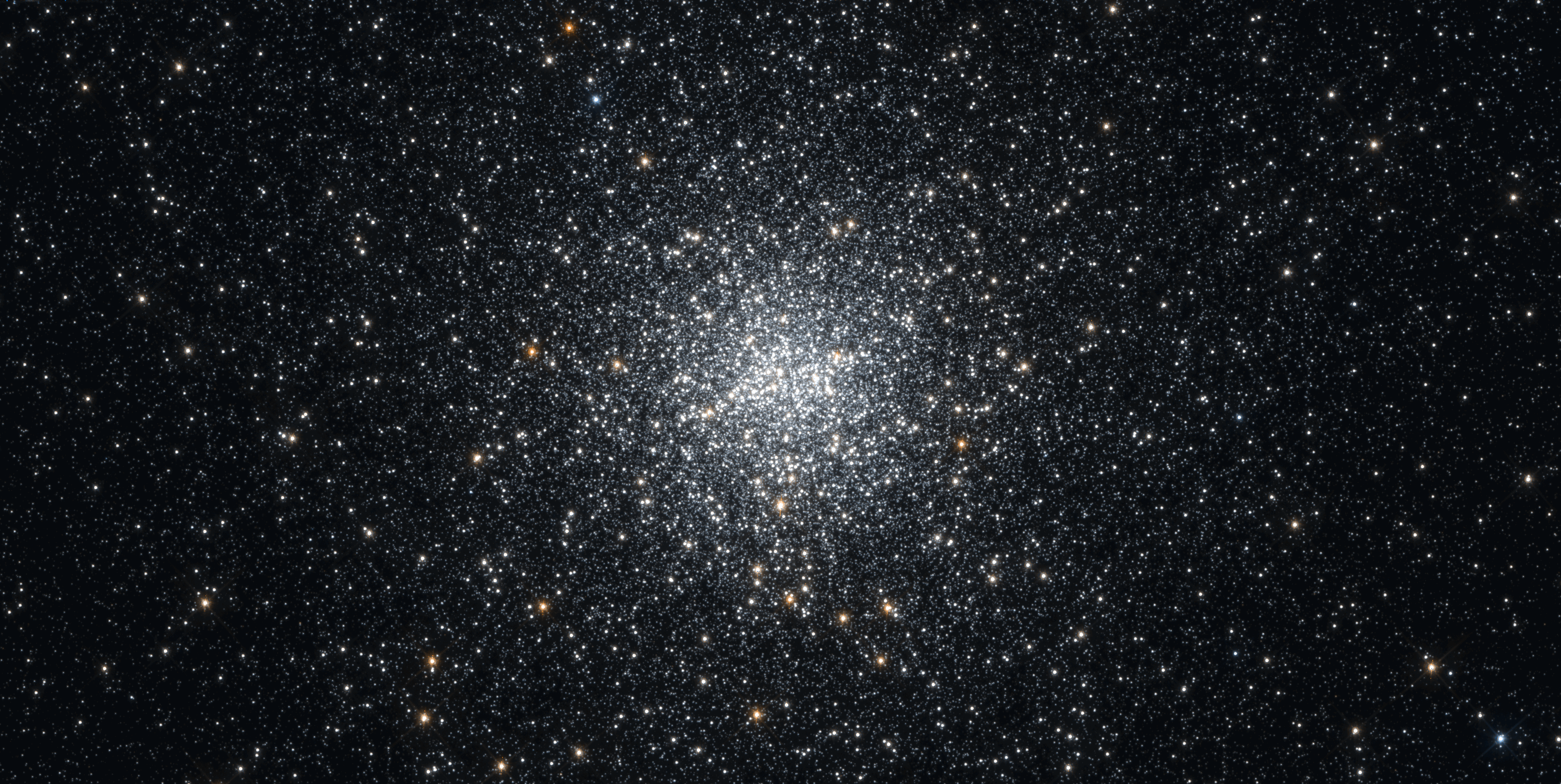
- HST image of NGC 6440

Observation data (J2000 epoch)
- Class: V
- Constellation: Sagittarius
- Right ascension: 17^{h} 48^{m} 52.67^{s}
- Declination: −20° 21′ 34.5″
- Distance: 27.1 ± 1.3 kly (8.3 ± 0.4 kpc)
- Apparent magnitude (V): 9.3
- Apparent dimensions (V): 4.4′

Physical characteristics
- Mass: > 4.42×10^{5} M_{☉}
- Metallicity: [Fe/H] = −0.56 dex
- Estimated age: ≈11 Gyr
- Other designations: NGC 6440

NGC 6440 is a globular cluster of stars in the southern constellation of Sagittarius. It was discovered by German-English astronomer William Herschel on 28 May 1786. With an apparent visual magnitude of 9.3 and an angular diameter of 4.4′, it can be observed as a fuzzy blob when viewed through a small telescope. Its Shapley–Sawyer Concentration Class is V.

This cluster is located at a distance of 27.1 ± 1.3 kly (8.3 ± 0.4 kpc) from the Sun. It is situated toward the galactic bulge of the Milky Way, about 26 kly (8.0 kpc) from the Galactic Center. The center of the cluster is fairly concentrated, but does not appear to have undergone a core collapse. It has a core radius of 0.85 ly (0.26 pc), and a half-mass radius of 6.6 ly (2.02 pc). Observations suggest it is one of the most metal–rich globular clusters in the galaxy, and it is close to solar metallicity. NGC 6440 is a rich target for Astrophysical X-ray sources. As of 2022, thirteen pulsars have been discovered in NGC 6440.
