= NGC 4976 =

Galaxy in the constellation Centaurus

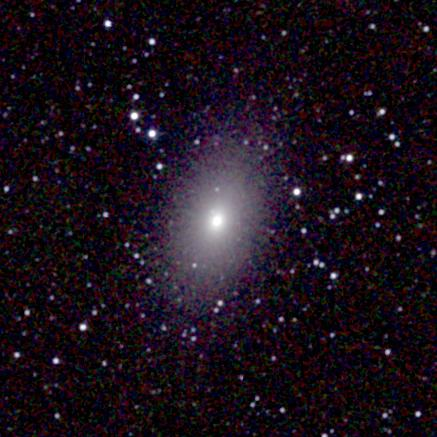
- NGC 4976 2MASS (near-infrared)

Observation data (J2000 epoch)
- Constellation: Centaurus
- Right ascension: 13^{h} 08^{m} 37.5^{s}
- Declination: −49° 30′ 23″
- Redshift: 0.004847
- Heliocentric radial velocity: 1453 ± 24 km/s
- Distance: 41 ± 17 Mly (12.5 ± 5.3 Mpc)
- Apparent magnitude (V): 11.0

Characteristics
- Type: E4 pec
- Apparent size (V): 5.6′ × 3.0′

Other designations
- PGC 45562

NGC 4976 is a peculiar elliptical galaxy in the constellation Centaurus. It was discovered by British astronomer John Herschel on 31 March 1835.
