= NGC 3132 =

Planetary nebula in the constellation Vela

Emission nebula
- Planetary nebula
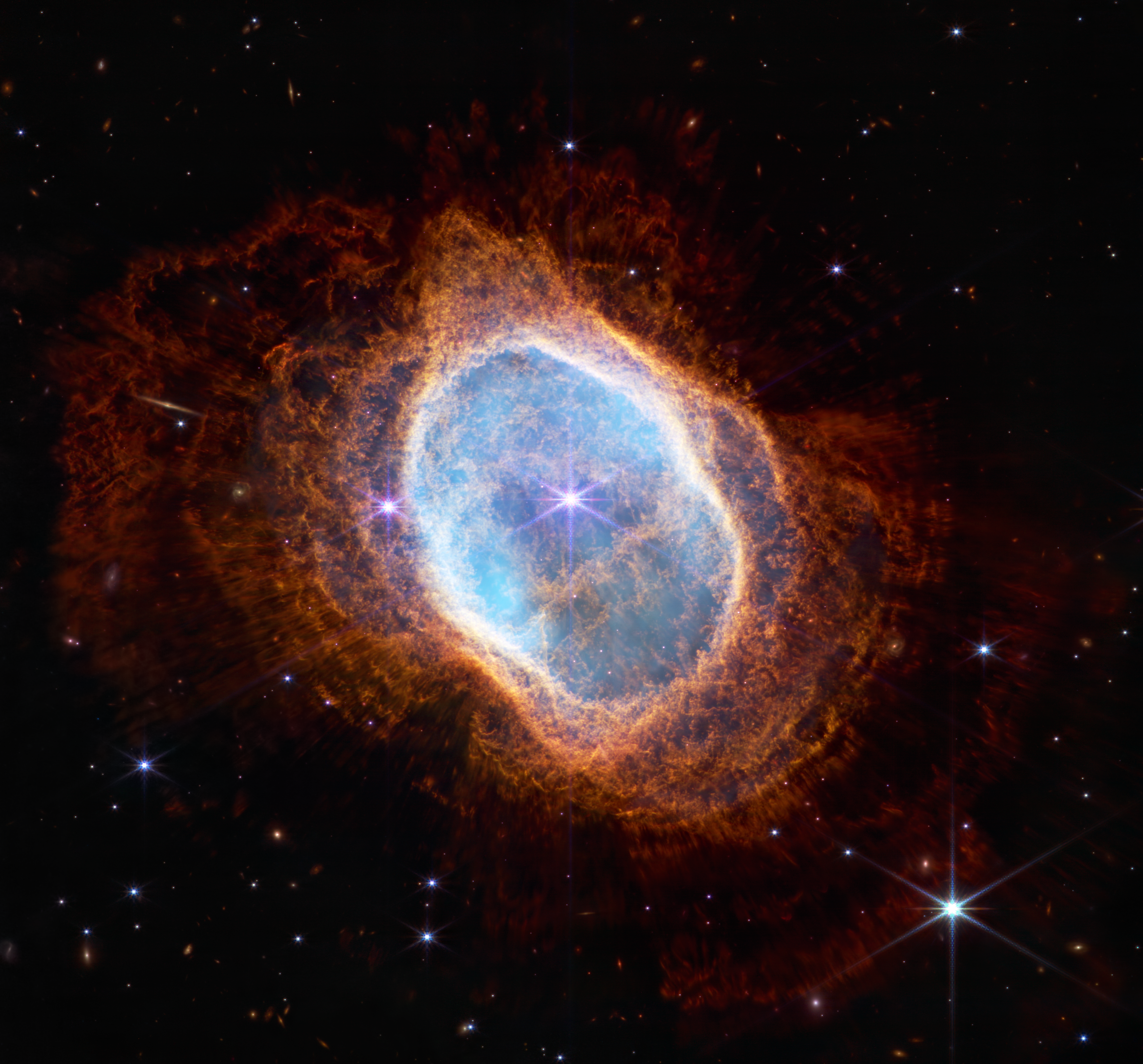
- View in near-infrared from NIRCam on the James Webb Space Telescope

Observation data: J2000.0 epoch
- Right ascension: 10^{h} 07^{m} 01.7640^{s}
- Declination: −40° 26′ 11.060″
- Distance: 2,000 ly
- Apparent magnitude (V): 9.2
- Apparent dimensions (V): 62″ × 43″
- Constellation: Vela

Physical characteristics
- Radius: 0.4 ly
- Designations: Eight-Burst Nebula, Southern Ring Nebula, Caldwell 74, HD 87877

NGC 3132 is a bright and extensively studied planetary nebula in the constellation Vela. Alternatively, it is known as the Eight-Burst Nebula, the Southern Ring Nebula, or Caldwell 74. Its distance from Earth is estimated at 613 pc or 2,000 light-years. From Earth, it appears to have a strongly elliptical shape. Three-dimensional modeling of the nebula has found that NGC 3132 is a bipolar nebula, with its major axis inclined about twenty degrees from the line of sight. It can only been seen from the Southern Hemisphere. Despite this however, it can be seen as north as Virginia. This central low-density cavity is surrounded by multiple ring-like structures.

The Southern Ring Nebula was selected as one of the five cosmic objects observed by the James Webb Space Telescope as part of the release of its first official science images on July 12, 2022.

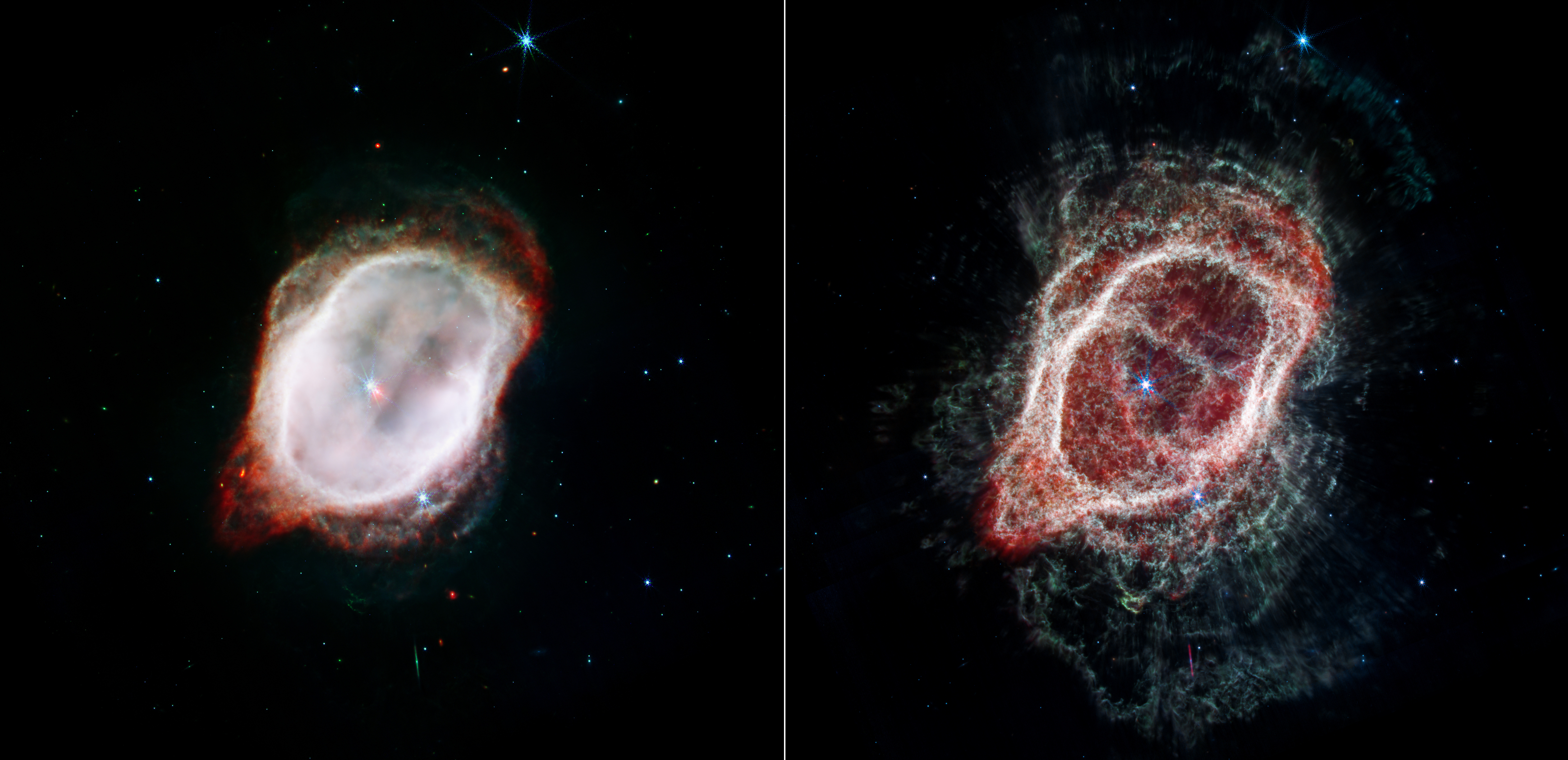
Two images of NGC 3132 in near- and mid-infrared light

== Planetary nebula nucleus (PNN) ==
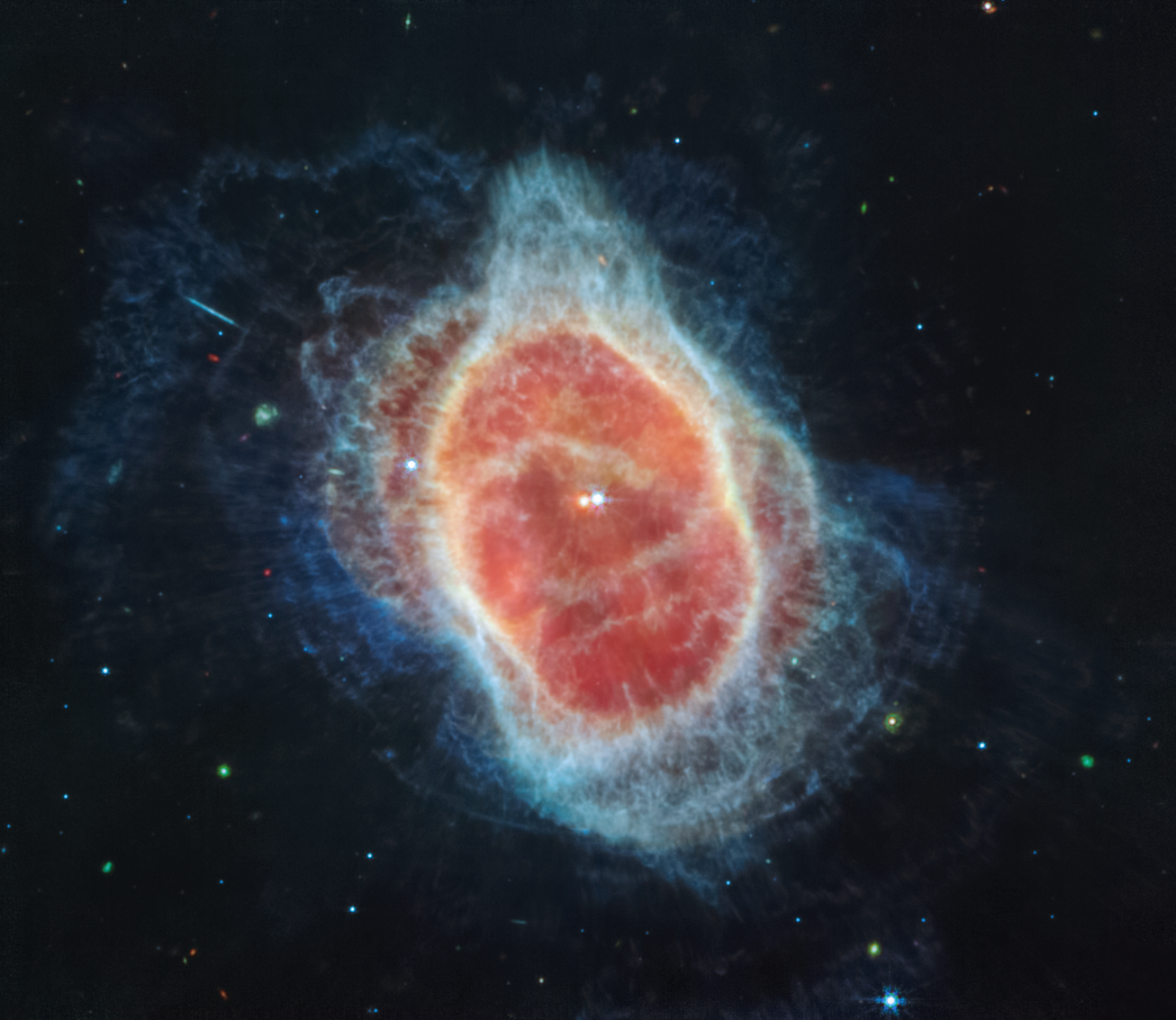
James Webb image revealing the two stars inside the nebula (orange-white and blueish-white, center)

Images of NGC 3132 reveal two stars close together within the nebulosity, one of 10th magnitude, the other 16th, located about 1.7″ away from the central star. The central star of the planetary nebula is a white dwarf, and is the fainter of the two stars. This hot central star of about 140,000 K has now blown off its outer layers and is making the nebula fluoresce brightly from the emission of its intense ultraviolet radiation. The 10th magnitude star, HD 87892, is an A-type main-sequence star of type A2V, and is separated from the white dwarf by at least 1277 au. The A-type star orbits at roughly the same distance as the edge of a dust cloud surrounding the central white dwarf. The system is likely a quadruple star system.

The progenitor star of the planetary nebula had a mass of about 2.7 times that of the Sun.

== See also ==
- List of NGC objects
- List of planetary nebulae
