= Shapley–Sawyer Concentration Class =

Classification system of globular clusters

The Shapley–Sawyer Concentration Class is a classification system on a scale of one to twelve using Roman numerals for globular clusters according to their concentration. The most highly concentrated clusters such as M75 are classified as Class I, with successively diminishing concentrations ranging to Class XII, such as Palomar 12. (The class is sometimes given with numbers [Class 1–12] rather than with Roman numerals.)

From 1927 to 1929, Harlow Shapley and Helen Sawyer Hogg began categorizing clusters according to the degree of concentration the system has toward the core using this scale. This became known as the Shapley–Sawyer Concentration Class.

== Classes ==
Class	Description	Example
I	High concentration toward the center	Messier 75
II	Dense central concentration	Messier 2
III	Strong inner core of stars	Messier 54
IV	Intermediate rich concentrations	Messier 15
V	Intermediate concentrations	Messier 30
VI	Intermediate mild concentration	Messier 3
VII	Intermediate loose concentration	Messier 22
VIII	Rather loosely concentrated towards the center	Messier 14
IX	Loose towards the center	Messier 12
X	Loose	Messier 68
XI	Very loose towards the center	Messier 55
XII	Almost no concentration towards the center	Palomar 12
