= SNR G127.1+00.5 =

Supernova remnant

- Event type: Supernova remnant
- Declination: +63° 10′
- Galactic coordinates: G127.1+00.5
- Other designations: SNR G127.1+00.5, 2FGL J0128.0+6330

SNR G127.1+00.5, also known as G127.1+0.5 and R5, is a supernova remnant in the constellation Cassiopeia.

== Morphology ==
The characteristics of SNR G127.1+00.5 in the radio spectrum are well-known. It has a mostly-circular, shell-like appearance and is brightest in the north-northeast.

Millimeter-wavelength observations of the SNR's carbon monoxide content have revealed two main regions of CO emission: one that extends out of the remnant in a straight line and another in the northeast that curves into the rest of the nebula. The latter coincides with a shell-like structure that is visible between mid-infrared wavelengths and 1420 MHz radio wavelengths.

Diffuse visible light emission has also been observed from SNR G127.1+00.5. However, observations by the telescopes Chandra and ROSAT have not found any X-rays coming from the nebula.

Additionally, the compact object formed in the supernova has not been identified.

== Age and distance ==
SNR G127.1+00.5 is estimated to be 20,000 - 30,000 years old, although some estimates place its age closer to 43,000 years.

The distance of the SNR is not fully known. It is known to be closer than 2900 parsecs —a value obtained from the ages of associated objects and the SNR's kinematics—and some studies situate SNR G127.1+00.5 at 1150 or 1300 parsecs away, the latter value inferred from a possible association with open cluster NGC 559.

== See also ==
- List of supernova remnants
