= NGC 5777 =

Galaxy in the constellation Draco

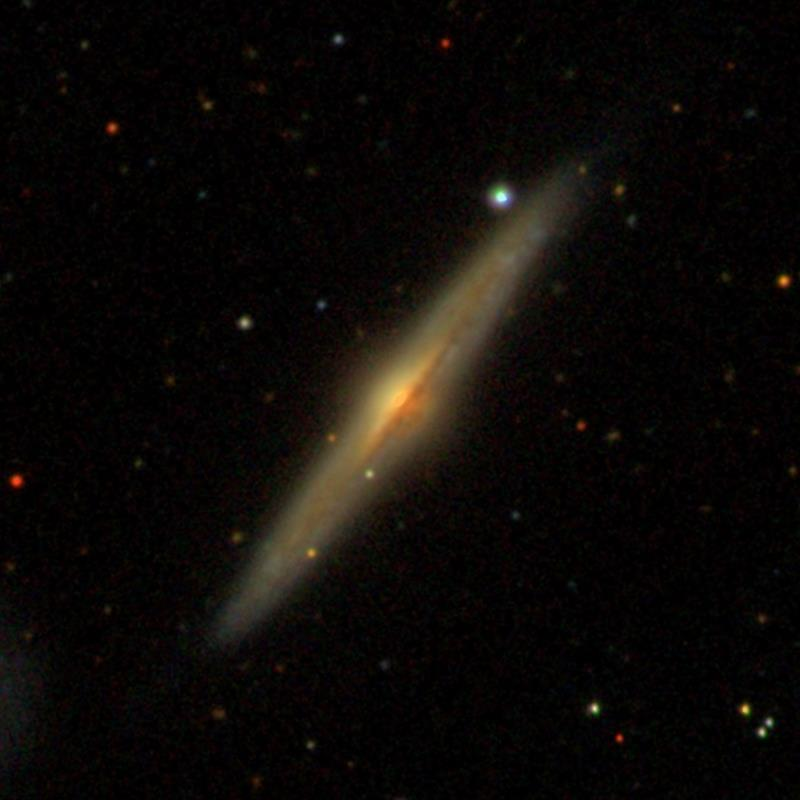

Observation data (J2000 epoch)
- Constellation: Draco
- Right ascension: 14h 51m 18s
- Declination: +58° 58′ 40″
- Distance: ~114 million
- Apparent magnitude (B): 14.2
- Surface brightness: 23.96 mag/arcsec2

Other designations
- UGC 9568, LEDA 53043, ISOSS J14513+5858

NGC 5777 is a large edge-on spiral galaxy located in the constellation Draco. Its speed relative to the cosmic microwave background is 2,210 ± 5 km/s, which corresponds to a Hubble distance of 32.6 ± 2.3 Mpc (~106 million ly). NGC 5777 was discovered by German-British astronomer William Herschel in 1789.

The luminosity class of NGC 5777 is II and it has a broad HI line. It is also an active galaxy with narrow optical emission lines. To date, nine non-redshift measurements yield a distance of 44.289 ± 8.577 Mpc (~144 million ly), which is just within the distance values of Hubble.

A spectrum obtained on July 10, 2001, by the Isaac Newton Telescope showed a type-IIp supernova at the center of NGC 5777. SN 2001dc was formed from a group of low-luminosity events, among with other supernovae in the region. They contain narrow spectral lines (indicating low expansion velocities) and low luminosities at every phase, which is untypical for a supernovae.

== See also ==
- NGC 4565, a similar galaxy
- Sombrero Galaxy, another similar galaxy
