= Saturn Nebula =

Planetary nebula in the constellation Aquarius

Emission nebula
- Planetary nebula
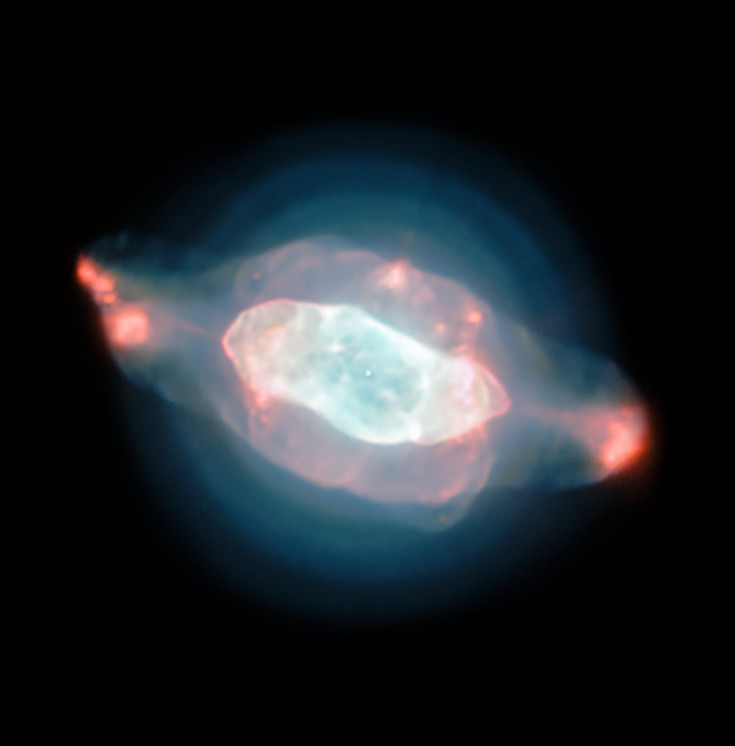
- NGC 7009 by Very Large Telescope.

Observation data: J2000.0 epoch
- Right ascension: 21^{h} 04^{m} 10.877^{s}
- Declination: −11° 21′ 48.25″
- Distance: 2000-4000 ly (See article) ly
- Apparent magnitude (V): 8.0
- Apparent dimensions (V): 41″ × 35″
- Constellation: Aquarius

Physical characteristics
- Radius: 0.2 to 0.4 ly
- Absolute magnitude (V): 2.5 to 1
- Notable features: -
- Designations: NGC 7009, Caldwell 55

The Saturn Nebula (also known as NGC 7009 or Caldwell 55) is a planetary nebula in the constellation Aquarius. It appears as a greenish-yellowish hue in a small amateur telescope. It was discovered by William Herschel on September 7, 1782, using a telescope of his own design in the garden at his home in Datchet, England, and was one of his earliest discoveries in his sky survey. The nebula was originally a low-mass star that ejected its layers into space, forming the nebula. The central star is now a bright white dwarf star of apparent magnitude 11.5. The Saturn Nebula gets its name from its superficial resemblance to the planet Saturn with its rings nearly edge-on to the observer. It was so named by Lord Rosse in the 1840s, when telescopes had improved to the point that its Saturn-like shape could be discerned. William Henry Smyth said that the Saturn Nebula was one of Struve's nine "Rare Celestial Objects".

The Saturn Nebula is a complex planetary nebula and contains many morphological and kinematic sub-systems in three dimensions. It includes a halo, jet-like streams, multiple shells, ansae ("handles"), and small-scale filaments and knots. The ansae are expanding non-radially from the central star. Although the ansae are most prominent in the Saturn Nebula, they are also visible in other planetary nebulae, including NGC 3242, NGC 6543 and NGC 2371-2.

The distance of the Saturn Nebula is not known precisely. Sabbadin et al. 2004 estimates the distance to be 5,200 light-years (1.6 kpc). In 1963 O'Dell estimated it to be 3,900 light-years (1.2 kpc), which gives an approximate diameter of 0.5 light years for the object as a whole.

The central star, a very hot bluish dwarf with a temperature of 55,000 K, from which the nebula is believed to originate, has an absolute magnitude of +1.5, which equates to a luminosity of about 20 solar luminosities and a visual magnitude of 11.5. This strong ultraviolet irradiation from the central star creates the characteristic fluorescent green tint of the nebula via the radiation of doubly ionized oxygen. The object overall has a visual magnitude of 8 and a radial velocity of 28 miles per second towards the Earth.

The nebula is 1 degree west of the star Nu Aquarii. The central portion measures 25″ × 17″, while the outer shell extends to 41″ × 35″. The object is on many "best of" observing lists.

== Imaging ==
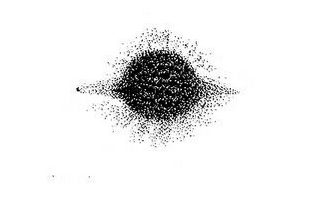
1848 drawing of NGC 7009 by Lord Rosse.

This visualisation shows three-dimensional MUSE data of the nebula.
