= Eye of Jupiter =

Eye of Jupiter may refer to:

- "The Eye of Jupiter" (Battlestar Galactica), an episode of Battlestar Galactica
- NGC 3242 or Eye of Jupiter Nebula, a nebula
- Great Red Spot of the planet Jupiter
