= NGC 7662 =

Planetary nebula in the constellation Andromeda

Emission nebula
- Planetary nebula
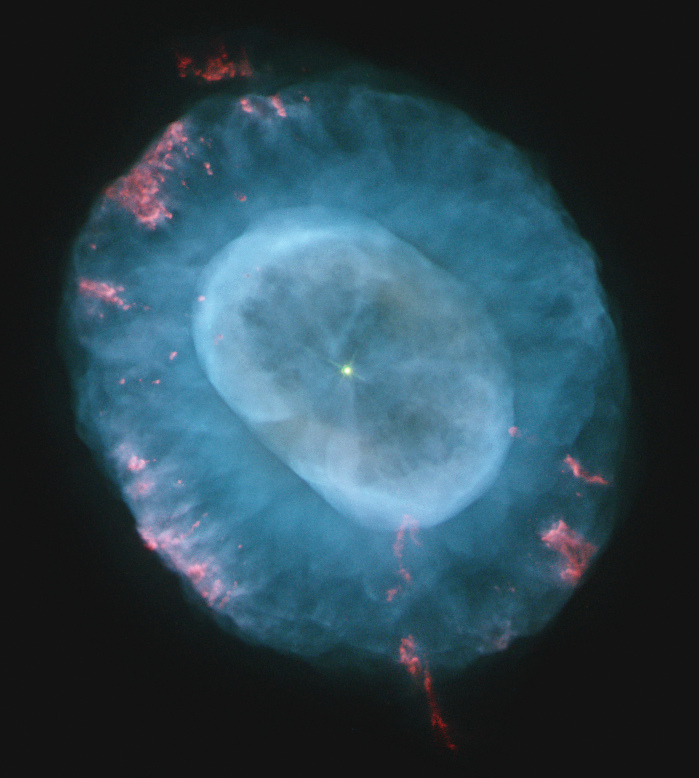

Observation data: J2000 epoch
- Right ascension: 23^{h} 25^{m} 53.832^{s}
- Declination: +42° 32′ 05.84″
- Distance: 5,730 ± 340 ly
- Apparent magnitude (V): 8.3
- Apparent dimensions (V): 32″ × 28″
- Constellation: Andromeda

Physical characteristics
- Radius: 0.8 ly
- Designations: PK 106-17 1, GCRV 14695, PN ARO 20, Blue Snowball Nebula, Snowball Nebula, Caldwell 22

NGC 7662 is a planetary nebula located in the northern constellation Andromeda. It is known as the Blue Snowball Nebula, Snowball Nebula, and Caldwell 22. This nebula was discovered October 6, 1784 by the German-born English astronomer William Herschel. In the New General Catalogue it is described as a "magnificent planetary or annular nebula, very bright, pretty small in angular size, round, blue, variable nucleus". The object has an apparent visual magnitude of 8.3 and spans an angular size of 32″ × 28″. Parallax measurements give a distance estimate of 5,730 ± 340 ly (1,757 ± 103 pc).

NGC 7662 is a popular planetary nebula for casual observers. A small telescope will reveal a star-like object with slight nebulosity. A 6" telescope with a magnification around 100x will reveal a slightly bluish disk, while telescopes with a primary mirror at least 16" in diameter may reveal slight color and brightness variations in the interior.

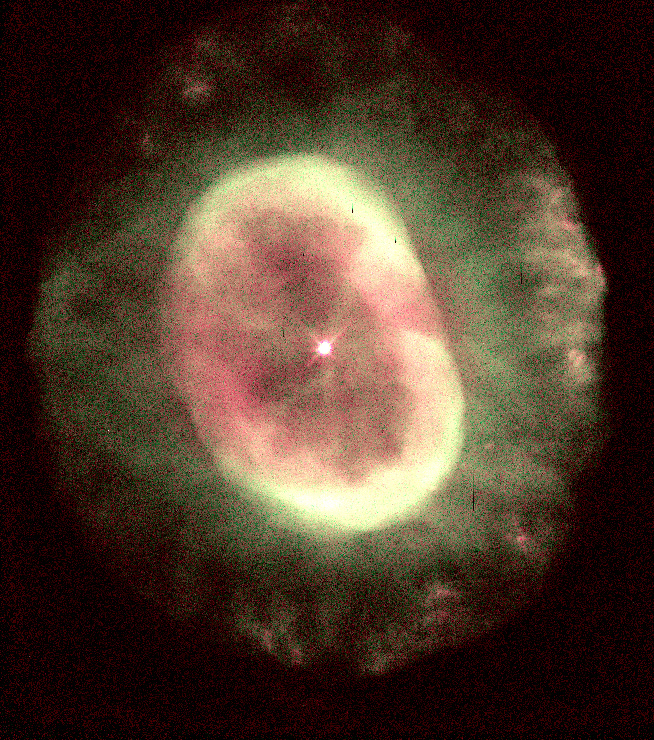
Hubble Space Telescope image of NGC 7662

This nebula has an elliptical shape with a triple-shell structure. The brightest is the main shell, which spans 12″ × 18″. This is surrounded by a fainter outer shell, which has an elliptical form. Both shells are enclosed by a faint, circular halo, some 134″ in diameter. The two shells can be modeled as prolate spheroids, with the inner shell having the greater elongation, a major axis tilt of 50° to the line of sight, and a hull thickness of ~2.5″. Several knots and a jet-like structure are visible, which display emission lines and low ionization. Based on the expansion rate, the estimated age of the nebula is 3,080 years.

The central star of the planetary nebula is a subdwarf O star with a spectral type of sdO. The best fit model for this star gives an effective temperature of 100000 K, with 5,250 times the luminosity of the Sun, 0,23723314079 Size of a sun and 60.5% of the Sun's mass. X-ray emission from the nebula is being generated by the stellar wind from this star striking previously ejected matter.

== See also ==
- NGC 2022, which resembles NGC 7662
- NGC 2392
- NGC 3242
- List of NGC objects
- Planetary nebulae
