= Caldwell catalogue =

Astronomical objects catalogued by Patrick Moore

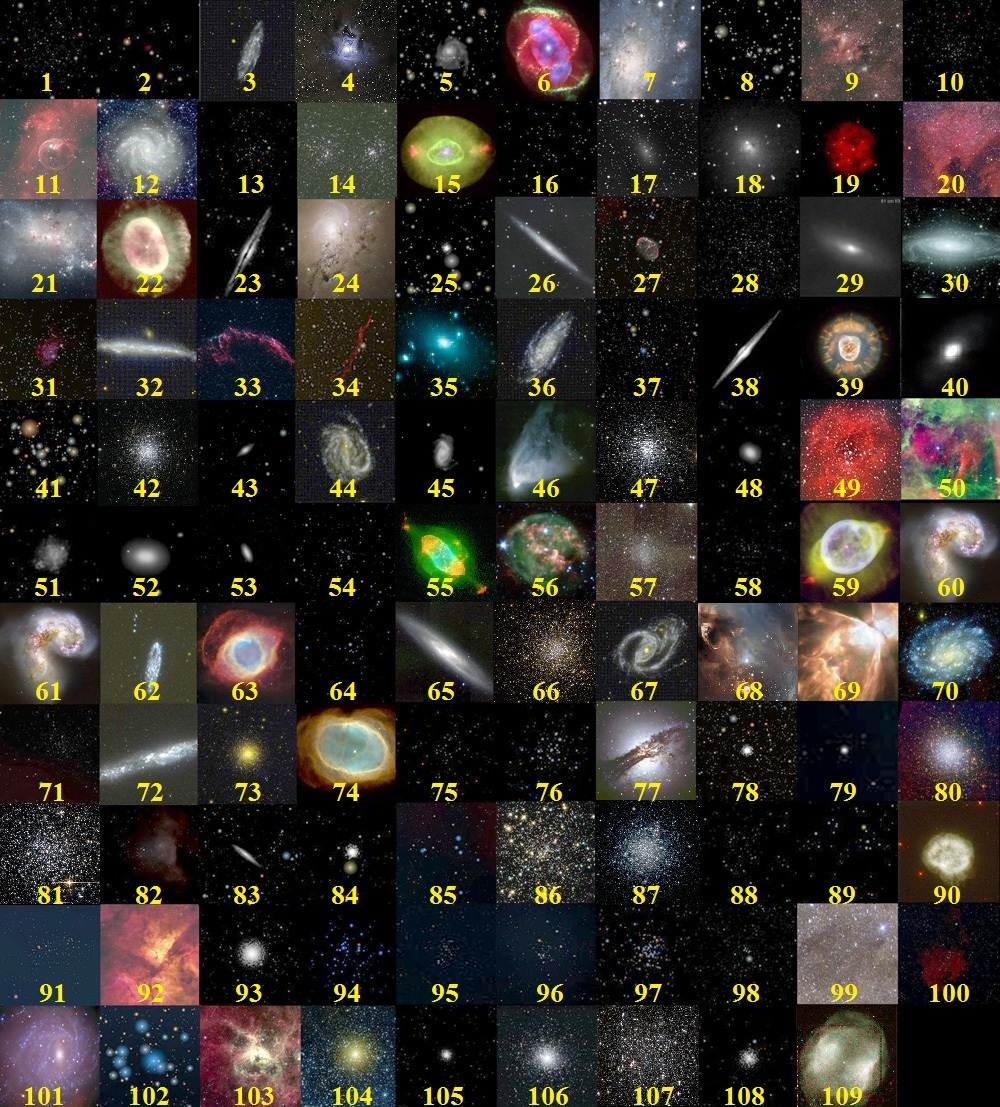
- Montage of Caldwell Catalogue objects.
- Alternative names: Caldwell object
- Related media on Commons

The Caldwell catalogue is an astronomical catalogue of 109 star clusters, nebulae, and galaxies for observation by amateur astronomers. The list was compiled by Patrick Moore as a complement to the Messier catalogue.

While the Messier catalogue is used by amateur astronomers as a list of deep-sky objects for observation, Moore noted that Messier's list was not compiled for that purpose and excluded many of the sky's brightest deep-sky objects, such as the Hyades, the Double Cluster (NGC 869 and NGC 884), and the Sculptor Galaxy (NGC 253). The Messier catalogue was actually compiled as a list of known objects that might be confused with comets. Moore also observed that since Messier compiled his list from observations in Paris, it did not include bright deep-sky objects visible in the Southern Hemisphere, such as Omega Centauri, Centaurus A, the Jewel Box, and 47 Tucanae. Moore compiled a list of 109 objects to match the commonly accepted number of Messier objects (he excluded M110), and the list was published in Sky & Telescope in December 1995.

Moore used his other surname – Caldwell – to name the list, since the initial of "Moore" is already used for the Messier catalogue. Entries in the catalogue are designated with a "C" and the catalogue number (1 to 109).

Unlike objects in the Messier catalogue, which are listed roughly in the order of discovery by Messier and his colleagues, the Caldwell catalogue is ordered by declination, with C1 being the most northerly and C109 being the most southerly, although two objects (NGC 4244 and the Hyades) are listed out of sequence. Other errors in the original list have since been corrected: it incorrectly identified the S Norma Cluster (NGC 6087) as NGC 6067 and incorrectly labelled the Lambda Centauri Cluster (IC 2944) as the Gamma Centauri Cluster.

== Reception ==
The Caldwell Catalogue has generated controversy in the amateur astronomy community for several reasons.

- Moore did not discover any of the objects in his catalogue which are often very well known objects and not 'neglected' as claimed by Moore.
- Its presentation as a catalogue with distinct designations, rather than a list, potentially may cause confusion amongst amateur astronomers as the 'C' Designation is not commonly used.
- The list was promoted as an extension of the Messier Catalogue, however the objects are often arbitrary with many easily viewable objects omitted while some objects not readily available to visual observers are included.

Caldwell advocates, however, see the catalogue as a useful list of some of the brightest and best known non-Messier deep-sky objects. Thus, advocates dismiss any "controversy" as being fabricated by older amateurs simply not able or willing to memorize the new designations despite every telescope database using the Caldwell IDs as the primary designation since the late 1990s. NASA/Hubble also lists the 109 objects by their Caldwell number.

== Caldwell star chart ==
Caldwell star chart (using Caldwell numbers)

Caldwell star chart (using NGC numbers, IC numbers, and other equivalent designations)

== Number of objects by type in the Caldwell catalogue ==
Type of object	Number of objects
Dark nebulae	1
Galaxies	35
Globular clusters	18
Nebulae	9
Star clusters	25
Star clusters and nebulae	6
Planetary nebulae	13
Supernova remnants	2
Total	109

== Caldwell objects ==
Open cluster Globular cluster Dark nebula Diffuse nebula Planetary nebula Supernova remnant Galaxy

Caldwell number	NGC number	Common name	Image	Type	Distance (1000 ly)	Constellation	Apparent magnitude
C1	NGC 188	Polarissima Cluster		Open Cluster	4.8	Cepheus	8.1
C2	NGC 40	Bow-Tie Nebula		Planetary Nebula	3.5	Cepheus	11
C3	NGC 4236			Barred Spiral Galaxy	7,000	Draco	9.7
C4	NGC 7023	Iris Nebula		Open Cluster and Nebula	1.4	Cepheus	7
C5	IC 342	Hidden Galaxy		Spiral Galaxy	10,000	Camelopardalis	9
C6	NGC 6543	Cat's Eye Nebula		Planetary Nebula	3	Draco	9
C7	NGC 2403			Spiral Galaxy	14,000	Camelopardalis	8.4
C8	NGC 559			Open Cluster	3.7	Cassiopeia	9.5
C9	Sh2-155	Cave Nebula		Nebula	2.8	Cepheus	7.7
C10	NGC 663			Open Cluster	7.2	Cassiopeia	7.1
C11	NGC 7635	Bubble Nebula		Nebula	7.1	Cassiopeia	10
C12	NGC 6946	Fireworks Galaxy		Spiral Galaxy	18,000	Cepheus	8.9
C13	NGC 457	Owl Cluster, E.T. Cluster		Open Cluster	7.9	Cassiopeia	6.4
C14	NGC 869 & NGC 884	Double Cluster, h & χ Persei		Open Cluster	7.3	Perseus	4
C15	NGC 6826	Blinking Planetary		Planetary Nebula	2.2	Cygnus	10
C16	NGC 7243			Open Cluster	2.5	Lacerta	6.4
C17	NGC 147			Dwarf Spheroidal Galaxy	2,300	Cassiopeia	9.3
C18	NGC 185			Dwarf Spheroidal Galaxy	2,300	Cassiopeia	9.2
C19	IC 5146	Cocoon Nebula		Open Cluster and Nebula	3.3	Cygnus	7.2
C20	NGC 7000	North America Nebula		Nebula	2.6	Cygnus	4
C21	NGC 4449			Irregular galaxy	10,000	Canes Venatici	9.4
C22	NGC 7662	Blue Snowball		Planetary Nebula	3.2	Andromeda	9
C23	NGC 891	Silver Sliver Galaxy		Spiral Galaxy	31,000	Andromeda	10
C24	NGC 1275	Perseus A		Supergiant Elliptical Galaxy	230,000	Perseus	11.6
C25	NGC 2419			Globular Cluster	275	Lynx	10.4
C26	NGC 4244			Spiral Galaxy	10,000	Canes Venatici	10.2
C27	NGC 6888	Crescent Nebula		Nebula	4.7	Cygnus	7.4
C28	NGC 752			Open Cluster	1.2	Andromeda	5.7
C29	NGC 5005			Spiral Galaxy	69,000	Canes Venatici	9.8
C30	NGC 7331			Spiral Galaxy	47,000	Pegasus	9.5
C31	IC 405	Flaming Star Nebula		Nebula	1.6	Auriga	13
C32	NGC 4631	Whale Galaxy		Barred Spiral Galaxy	22,000	Canes Venatici	9.3
C33	NGC 6992	East Veil Nebula		Supernova Remnant	2.5	Cygnus	7
C34	NGC 6960	West Veil Nebula		Supernova Remnant	2.5	Cygnus	7
C35	NGC 4889	Coma B		Supergiant Elliptical Galaxy	300,000	Coma Berenices	11.4
C36	NGC 4559			Spiral Galaxy	32,000	Coma Berenices	9.9
C37	NGC 6885			Open Cluster	1.95	Vulpecula	6
C38	NGC 4565	Needle Galaxy		Spiral Galaxy	32,000	Coma Berenices	9.6
C39	NGC 2392	Eskimo Nebula, Clown Face Nebula		Planetary Nebula	4	Gemini	10
C40	NGC 3626			Lenticular Galaxy	86,000	Leo	10.9
C41	Mel 25	Hyades		Open Cluster	0.151	Taurus	0.5
C42	NGC 7006			Globular Cluster	135	Delphinus	10.6
C43	NGC 7814			Spiral Galaxy	49,000	Pegasus	10.5
C44	NGC 7479	Superman Galaxy		Barred Spiral Galaxy	106,000	Pegasus	11
C45	NGC 5248			Spiral Galaxy	74,000	Boötes	10.2
C46	NGC 2261	Hubble's Variable Nebula		Nebula	2.5	Monoceros	-
C47	NGC 6934			Globular Cluster	57	Delphinus	8.9
C48	NGC 2775			Spiral Galaxy	55,000	Cancer	10.3
C49	NGC 2237	Rosette Nebula		Nebula	4.9	Monoceros	9.0
C50	NGC 2244	Satellite Cluster		Open Cluster	4.9	Monoceros	4.8
C51	IC 1613			Irregular galaxy	2,300	Cetus	9.3
C52	NGC 4697			Elliptical galaxy	76,000	Virgo	9.3
C53	NGC 3115	Spindle Galaxy		Lenticular Galaxy	22,000	Sextans	9.2
C54	NGC 2506			Open Cluster	10	Monoceros	7.6
C55	NGC 7009	Saturn Nebula		Planetary Nebula	1.4	Aquarius	8
C56	NGC 246	Skull Nebula		Planetary Nebula	1.6	Cetus	8
C57	NGC 6822	Barnard's Galaxy		Barred irregular galaxy	2,300	Sagittarius	9
C58	NGC 2360	Caroline's Cluster		Open Cluster	3.7	Canis Major	7.2
C59	NGC 3242	Ghost of Jupiter		Planetary Nebula	1.4	Hydra	9
C60	NGC 4038	Antennae Galaxies		Interacting galaxy	83,000	Corvus	10.7
C61	NGC 4039	Antennae Galaxies		Interacting galaxy	83,000	Corvus	13
C62	NGC 247			Spiral Galaxy	6,800	Cetus	8.9
C63	NGC 7293	Helix Nebula		Planetary Nebula	0.522	Aquarius	7.3
C64	NGC 2362	Tau Canis Majoris Cluster		Open Cluster and Nebula	5.1	Canis Major	4.1
C65	NGC 253	Sculptor Galaxy		Spiral Galaxy	9,800	Sculptor	7.1
C66	NGC 5694			Globular Cluster	113	Hydra	10.2
C67	NGC 1097			Barred Spiral Galaxy	47,000	Fornax	9.3
C68	NGC 6729	R CrA Nebula		Nebula	0.424	Corona Australis	-
C69	NGC 6302	Bug Nebula		Planetary Nebula	5.2	Scorpius	13
C70	NGC 300	Sculptor Pinwheel Galaxy		Spiral Galaxy	3,900	Sculptor	9
C71	NGC 2477			Open Cluster	3.7	Puppis	5.8
C72	NGC 55	String of Pearls Galaxy		Barred Spiral Galaxy	4,200	Sculptor	8
C73	NGC 1851			Globular Cluster	39.4	Columba	7.3
C74	NGC 3132	Eight Burst Nebula		Planetary Nebula	2	Vela	8
C75	NGC 6124			Open Cluster	1.5	Scorpius	5.8
C76	NGC 6231			Open Cluster and Nebula	6	Scorpius	2.6
C77	NGC 5128	Centaurus A		Elliptical or Lenticular Galaxy	16,000	Centaurus	7
C78	NGC 6541			Globular Cluster	22.3	Corona Australis	6.6
C79	NGC 3201			Globular Cluster	17	Vela	6.8
C80	NGC 5139	Omega Centauri		Globular Cluster	17.3	Centaurus	3.7
C81	NGC 6352			Globular Cluster	18.6	Ara	8.2
C82	NGC 6193			Open Cluster	4.3	Ara	5.2
C83	NGC 4945			Barred Spiral Galaxy	17,000	Centaurus	9
C84	NGC 5286			Globular Cluster	36	Centaurus	7.6
C85	IC 2391	Omicron Velorum Cluster		Open Cluster	0.5	Vela	2.5
C86	NGC 6397			Globular Cluster	7.5	Ara	5.7
C87	NGC 1261			Globular Cluster	55.5	Horologium	8.4
C88	NGC 5823			Open Cluster	3.4	Circinus	7.9
C89	NGC 6087 (Note: C89 was mistakenly written as NGC 6067 in the original, but its description is that of NGC 6087.)	S Normae Cluster		Open Cluster	3.3	Norma	5.4
C90	NGC 2867			Planetary Nebula	5.5	Carina	10
C91	NGC 3532	Wishing Well Cluster		Open Cluster	1.6	Carina	3
C92	NGC 3372	Eta Carinae Nebula		Nebula	7.5	Carina	3
C93	NGC 6752	Great Peacock Globular		Globular Cluster	13	Pavo	5.4
C94	NGC 4755	Jewel Box		Open Cluster	4.9	Crux	4.2
C95	NGC 6025			Open Cluster	2.5	Triangulum Australe	5.1
C96	NGC 2516	Southern Beehive Cluster		Open Cluster	1.3	Carina	3.8
C97	NGC 3766	Pearl Cluster		Open Cluster	5.8	Centaurus	5.3
C98	NGC 4609			Open Cluster	4.2	Crux	6.9
C99	-	Coalsack Nebula		Dark Nebula	0.61	Crux	-
C100	IC 2944	Lambda Centauri Nebula		Open Cluster and Nebula	6	Centaurus	4.5
C101	NGC 6744			Spiral Galaxy	34,000	Pavo	9
C102	IC 2602	Theta Car Cluster		Open Cluster	0.492	Carina	1.9
C103	NGC 2070	Tarantula Nebula		Open Cluster and Nebula	170	Dorado	8.2
C104	NGC 362			Globular Cluster	27.7	Tucana	6.6
C105	NGC 4833			Globular Cluster	19.6	Musca	7.4
C106	NGC 104	47 Tucanae		Globular Cluster	14.7	Tucana	4
C107	NGC 6101			Globular Cluster	49.9	Apus	9.3
C108	NGC 4372			Globular Cluster	18.9	Musca	7.8
C109	NGC 3195			Planetary Nebula	5.4	Chamaeleon	11.6
Caldwell number	NGC number	Common name	Image	Object type	Distance to object in thousands of light years	Constellation	Apparent magnitude

== See also ==
- Messier Catalogue
- Herschel 400 Catalogue
- New General Catalogue (NGC)
- Index Catalogue (IC)
- Revised New General Catalogue (RNGC)
- Revised Index Catalogue (RIC)
- List of astronomical catalogues by Stephen James O'Meara
