= NGC 4244 =

Galaxy in the constellation Canes Venatici

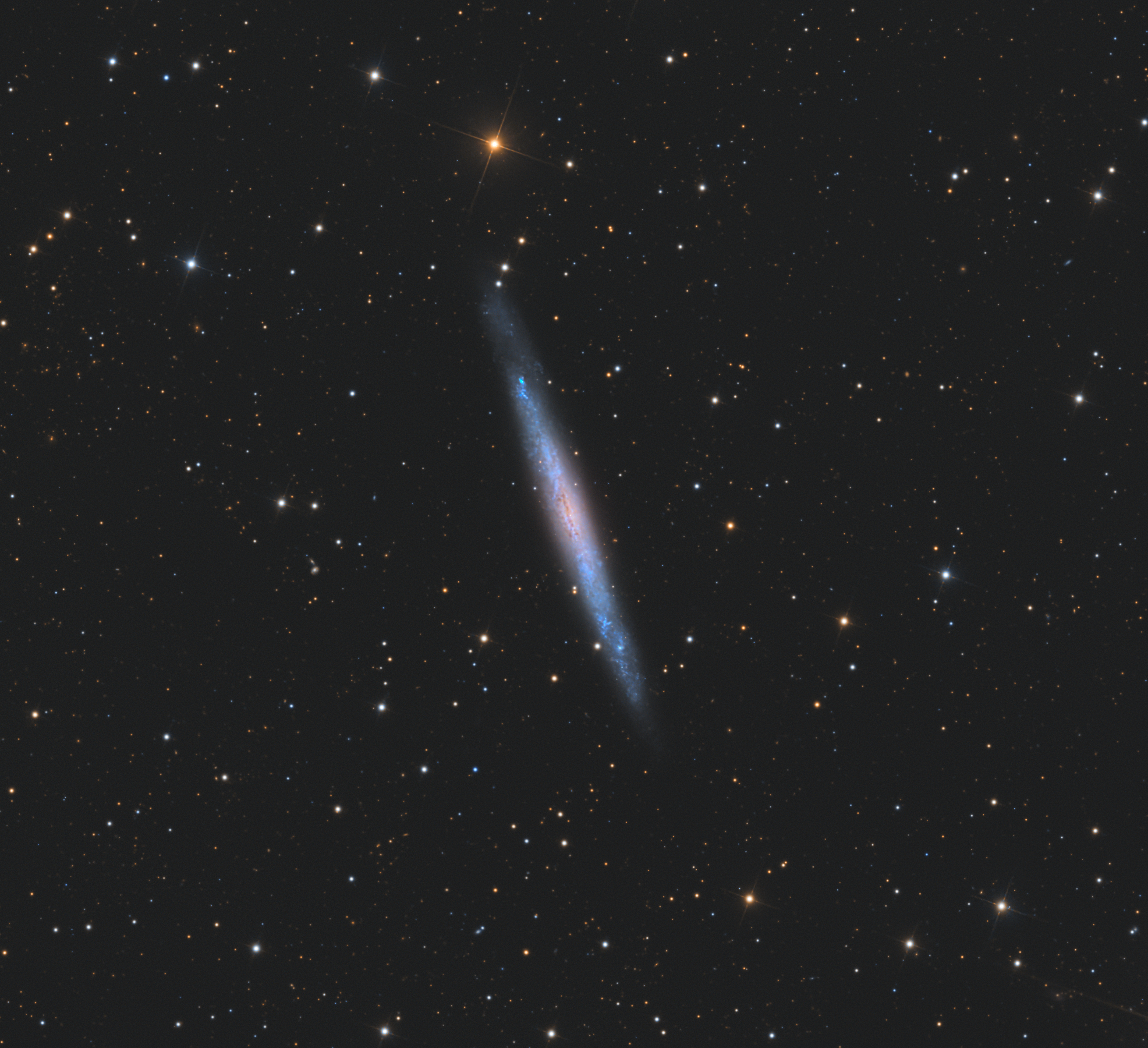
- NGC 4244

Observation data (J2000 epoch)
- Constellation: Canes Venatici
- Right ascension: 12^{h} 17^{m} 29.9^{s}
- Declination: +37° 48′ 27″
- Redshift: 0.000814
- Heliocentric radial velocity: +244 km/s
- Distance: 14.1 Mly (4.31 Mpc)
- Apparent magnitude (V): 10.18
- Apparent magnitude (B): 10.44

Characteristics
- Type: Sc
- Apparent size (V): 17.0′. × 2.2′

Other designations
- Caldwell 26, UGC 7322, MCG +06-27-045, PGC 39422

NGC 4244, also known as Caldwell 26, is an edge-on loose spiral galaxy in the constellation Canes Venatici, and is part of the M94 Group or Canes Venatici I Group, a galaxy group relatively close to the Local Group containing the Milky Way. In the sky, it is located near the yellow naked-eye star, Beta Canum Venaticorum, but also near the barred spiral galaxy NGC 4151 and irregular galaxy NGC 4214.

With an apparent V-band magnitude of 10.18, NGC 4244 lies approximately 4.3 megaparsecs (14 million light years) away. A nuclear star cluster and halo is located near the centre of this galaxy.

== See also ==
- IC 5052 - a similar edge-on galaxy
