= NGC 2867 =

Planetary nebula in the constellation Carina

Emission nebula
- Planetary nebula
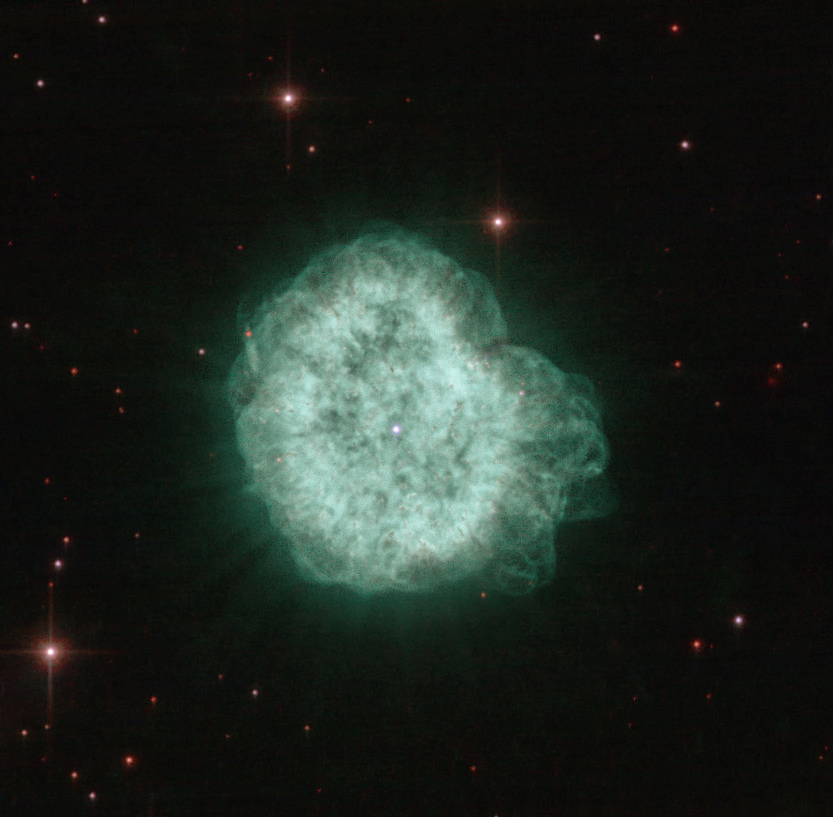
- Hubble Space Telescope (HST) image of NGC 2867; Credit: HST/NASA/ESA

Observation data: J2000 epoch
- Right ascension: 09^{h} 21^{m} 25.38336^{s}
- Declination: −58° 18′ 40.6167″
- Distance: 7,270 ly (2,228 pc) ly
- Apparent magnitude (V): 9.7
- Apparent dimensions (V): 12″ 43.3″ × 35.6″
- Constellation: Carina
- Designations: ESO 126-8, PN G278.1-05.9, Caldwell 90

NGC 2867 (also known as Caldwell 90) is an elliptical Type II planetary nebula in the southern constellation of Carina, just over a degree to the NNW of the star Iota Carinae. It was discovered by John Herschel on April 1, 1834. Herschel initially thought he might have found a new planet, but on the following night he checked again and discovered it had not moved. The nebula is located at a distance of 7,270 light-years from the Sun.

The central star of the nebula is of spectral type WC3 and is in the process of evolving into a white dwarf, having previously shed the atmosphere that created the surrounding nebula. It is now a hydrogen deficient GW Vir variable that is undergoing non-radial pulsations with an amplitude of less than 0.3 in magnitude. The star has an estimated temperature of 165+18
−20 kK with 5% of the radius of the Sun and is radiating 1,400 times the Sun's luminosity.

The surrounding nebula is fairly typical but does shows carbon enrichment, which suggests the progenitor star was not massive but did pass through third dredge-up. The category of central star has excited a very high degree of ionization in the nebula. The shape of the nebula appears somewhat elongated, which may indicate an interaction with the surrounding interstellar matter. The nebula halo may be a recombination of two separate halos, which could indicate a peculiar mass-loss history.
