= NGC 40 =

Planetary Nebula in the constellation of Cepheus

Emission nebula
- Planetary nebula
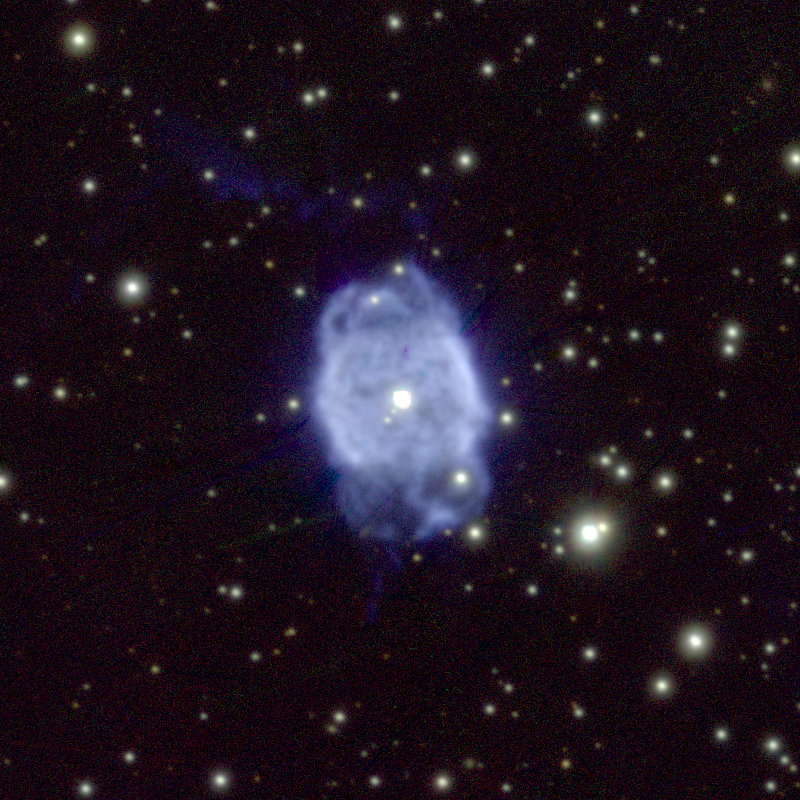
- PanSTARRS false-color image of NGC 40, using the red r-band image as blue

Observation data: J2000 epoch
- Right ascension: 00^{h} 13^{m} 01.017^{s}
- Declination: +72° 31′ 19.03″
- Distance: 1,619 pc
- Apparent magnitude (V): 11.6
- Apparent dimensions (V): 38″ × 35″
- Constellation: Cepheus
- Designations: Bow-Tie Nebula, Caldwell 2, PN G120.0+09.8

NGC 40, also known as the Bow-Tie Nebula or Caldwell 2, is a planetary nebula located around 5280 light years (1619 parsecs) from Earth in the Constellation of Cepheus. The nebula is about one light-year across. It was discovered by William Herschel on November 25, 1788.

The nebula formed due to a dying star ejecting its outer layers of gas leaving behind a small, hot stellar remnant known as a white dwarf. Radiation from the star causes the shed outer layer to heat to about 10,000 degrees Celsius and become visible as a planetary nebula. About 30,000 years from now, scientists theorize that NGC 40 will fade away, leaving only a white dwarf star approximately the size of Earth.

== Structure ==
The main structure of NGC 40 has a barrel-like shape with two moves expanding towards the northern and southern directions. The long axis pointing towards the north-northeast. There are two additional pairs of lobes around the poles, which correspond to additional ejections from the star. There is a cavity located in NGC 40 that is around 6500 years old. The northern and southern lobes were ejected around 4200 years ago.

=== Central star ===
The central star of NGC 40 has a Henry Draper Catalogue designation of HD 826. It has a spectral type of [WC8], indicating a spectrum similar to that of a carbon-rich Wolf–Rayet star. The central star has a bolometric luminosity of about 7,000 L_{☉} and radius of 0.56 R_{☉}.

The star appears to have an effective temperature of about 71,000 K, but the temperature of the source ionizing the nebula is only about 45,000 K. One proposed explanation to this contradiction is that the star was previously cooler, but has experienced a late thermal pulse which re-ignited fusion and caused its temperature to increase.

== Gallery ==
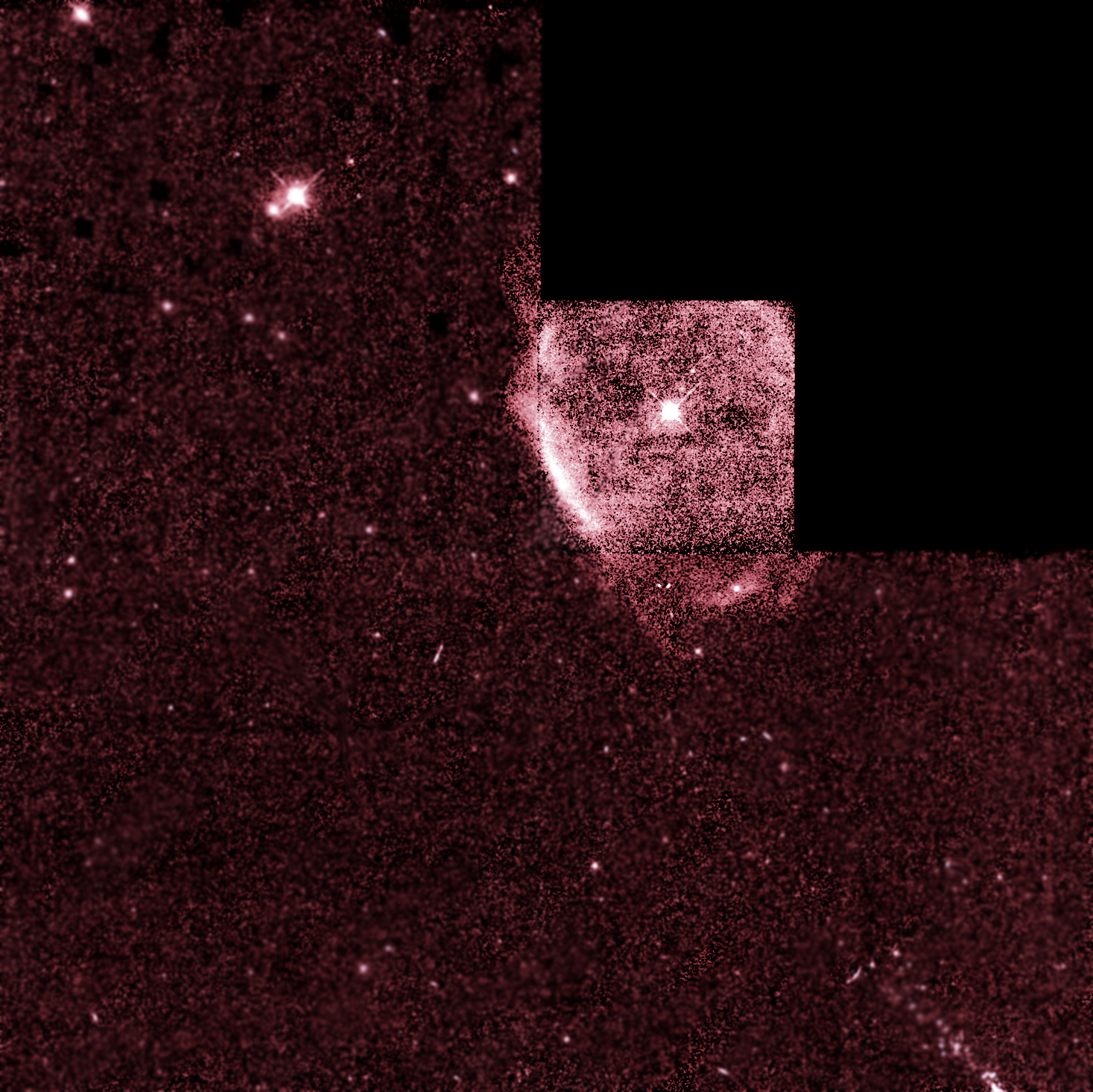
HST

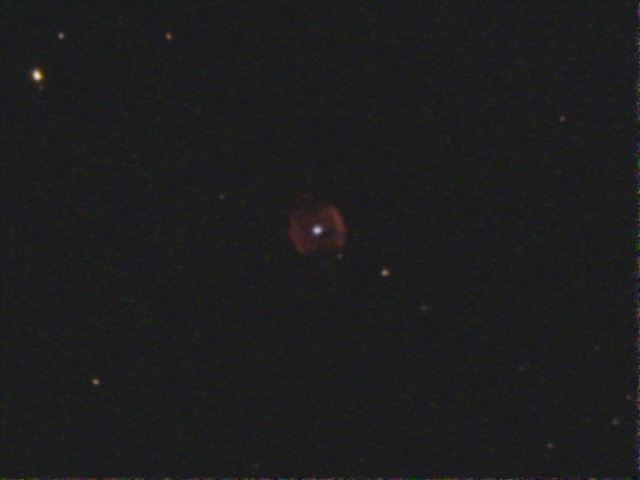
Image of NGC 40 by Amateur Astronomer

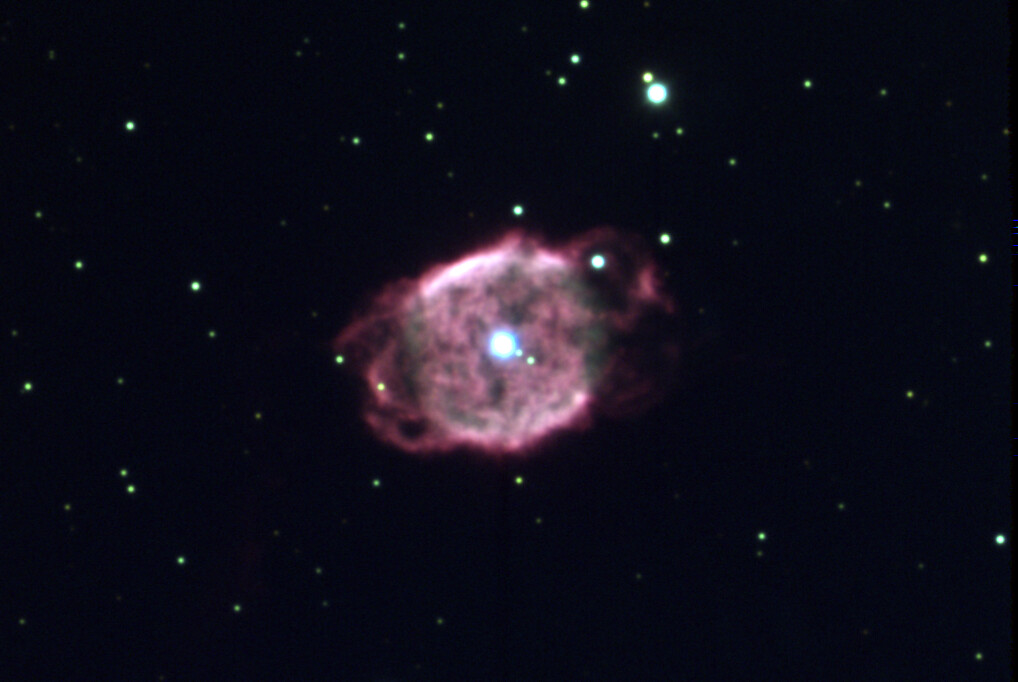
Optical image from the WIYN telescope

== See also ==
- List of planetary nebulae
- List of NGC objects
- List of NGC objects (1-1000)
