= NGC 3766 =

Open cluster in the constellation Centaurus

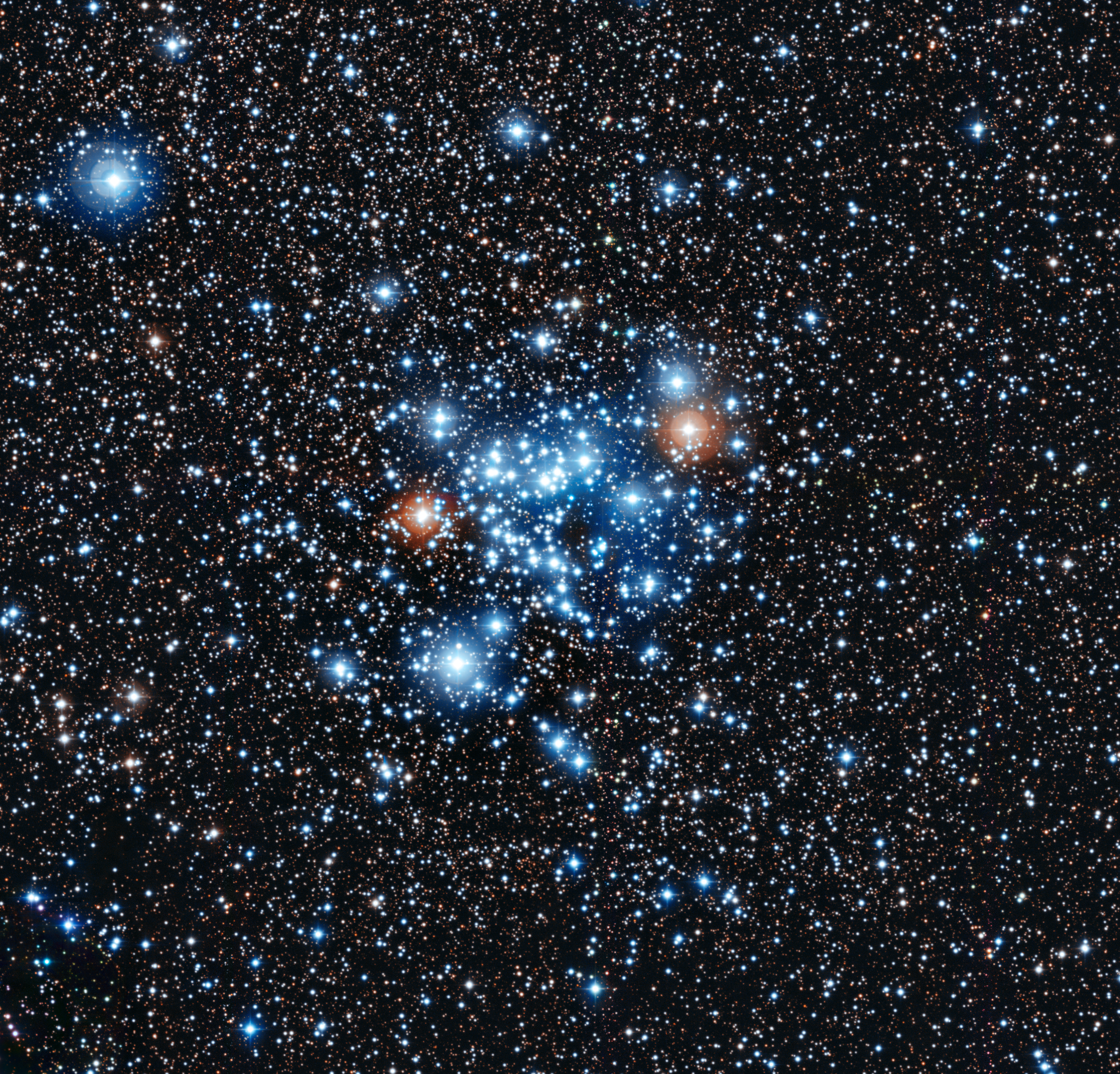
- NGC 3766 image taken with the MPG/ESO 1.2-metre telescope at the La Silla Observatory; Credit: ESO

Observation data (J2000 epoch)
- Right ascension: 11^{h} 36^{m} 14.6^{s}
- Declination: −61° 36′ 58″
- Distance: 6.66 kly (2.041 kpc)
- Apparent magnitude (V): 5.3
- Apparent dimensions (V): 15′

Physical characteristics
- Radius: 9.6 ly
- Estimated age: 25.7 Myr
- Easy to view via binoculars or telescope
- Other designations: NGC 3766, C 97, Collinder 248, Melotte 107, Dunlop 289, Lacaille III.7, C1133-613

Associations
- Constellation: Centaurus

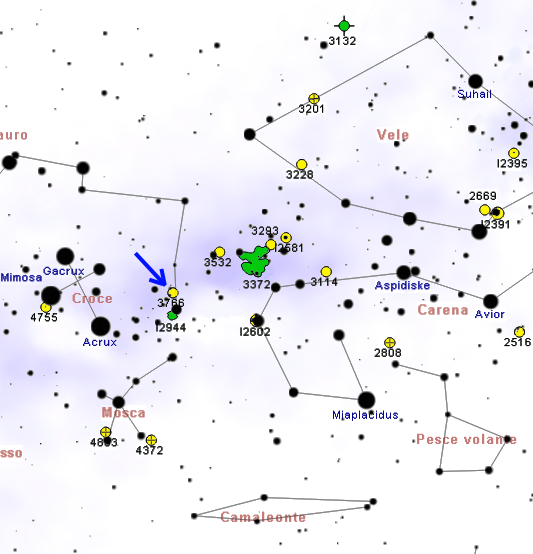
Map showing the location of NGC 3766.

NGC 3766 (also known as Caldwell 97 or the Rich Man's Jewel Box) is an open star cluster in the southern constellation Centaurus. It is located in the vast star-forming region known as the Carina molecular cloud, and was discovered by Nicolas Louis de Lacaille during his astrometric survey in 1751–1752. At a distance of about 1745 pc, the cluster subtends a diameter of about 12 minutes of arc.

There are 137 listed stars, but many are likely non-members, with only 36 having accurate photometric data. It has a total apparent magnitude of 5.3 and integrated spectral type of B1.7. NGC 3766 is relatively young, with an estimated age of log (7.160) or 14.4 million years, and is approaching us at 14.8 km/s. This cluster contains eleven Be stars, two red supergiants and four Ap stars.

36 examples of an unusual type of variable star were discovered in the cluster. These fast-rotating pulsating B-type stars vary by only a few hundredths of a magnitude with periods less than half a day. They are main sequence stars, hotter than δ Scuti variables and cooler than slowly pulsating B stars.

== See also ==
- New General Catalogue
