= NGC 6124 =

Open cluster in the constellation Scorpius

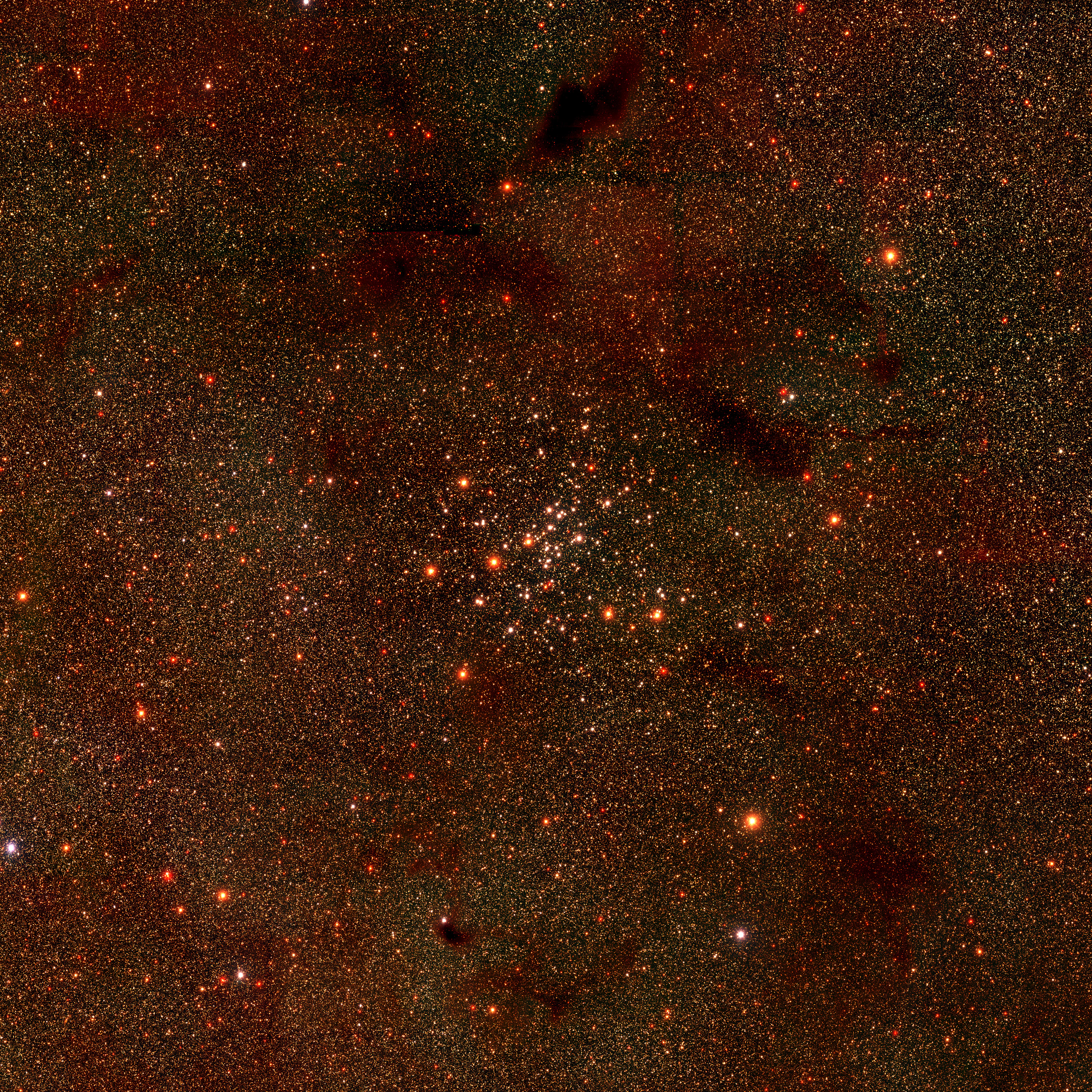
- NGC 6124; Credit: DECaPS

Observation data (J2000 epoch)
- Right ascension: 16^{h} 25^{m} 36^{s}
- Declination: −40° 40′ 00″
- Distance: 1,860 ly (512 pc)
- Apparent magnitude (V): 5.8
- Apparent dimensions (V): 29′

Physical characteristics
- Other designations: Caldwell 75, Cr 301, Mel 145, Raab 111, ESO 331-SC003, OCL 990, Lund 701, C 1622-405, Lacaille I.8, Dunlop 514

Associations
- Constellation: Scorpius

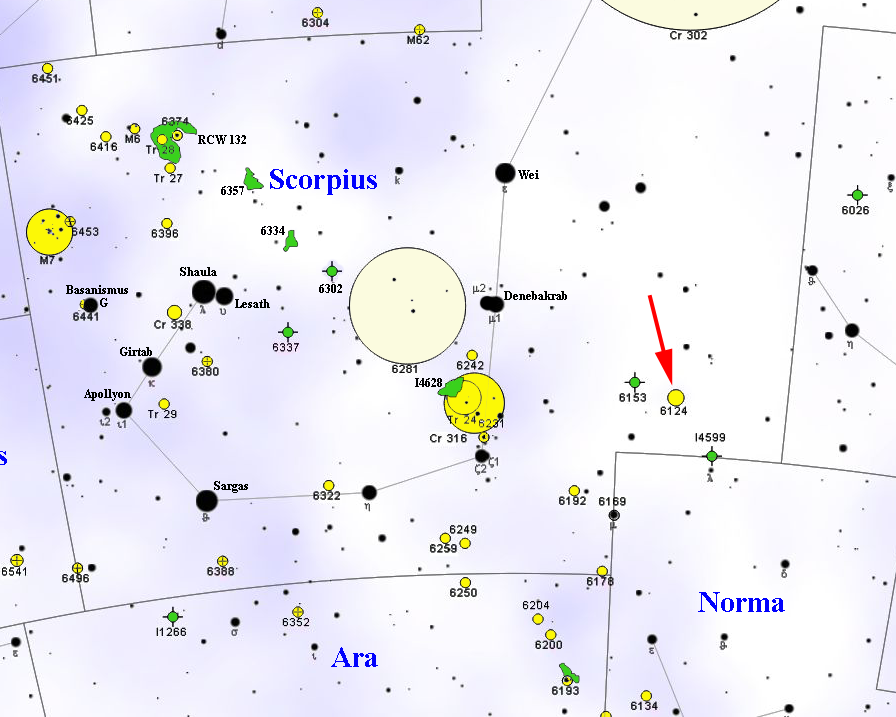
Map showing the location of NGC 6124

NGC 6124 (also known as Caldwell 75) is an open cluster located 1,860 light years away in the constellation Scorpius. It was discovered by Abbe Lacaille in 1751 during his South African tour.

The cluster is large and bright, with about 125 stars visible.
