= NGC 246 =

Planetary nebula in the constellation Cetus

Emission nebula
- Planetary nebula
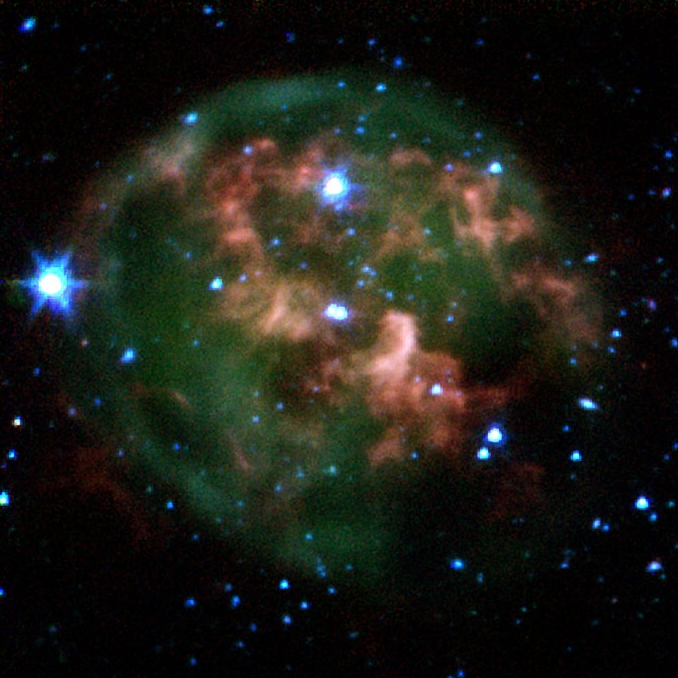
- An infrared Spitzer Space Telescope image of NGC 246. Credit: NASA/JPL.

Observation data: J2000 epoch
- Right ascension: 00^{h} 47^{m} 03.338^{s}
- Declination: −11° 52′ 18.94″
- Distance: 3,500+720 −850 ly
- Apparent magnitude (V): 8 / 11.8 (central star)
- Apparent dimensions (V): 3.8′
- Constellation: Cetus

Physical characteristics
- Radius: 2-3 ly
- Designations: Skull Nebula, Pac-Man Nebula, Caldwell 56, HIP 3678, PMN J0047-1152, 2E 178, PN VV 4, IRAS 00445-1207, MCT 0044-1208

NGC 246 (also known as the Skull Nebula or Caldwell 56) is a planetary nebula in the constellation Cetus. It was discovered in 1785 by William Herschel. The nebula and the stars associated with it are listed in several catalogs, as summarized by the SIMBAD database.

The nebula is roughly 3,500+720
−850 light-years away. NGC 246's central star is the 12th magnitude white dwarf HIP 3678 A. In 2014, astronomers discovered a second companion to NGC 246's central star, which has a comoving companion star called HIP 3678 B. The second companion star, a red dwarf known as HIP 3678 C, was discovered using the European Southern Observatory's Very Large Telescope. This makes NGC 246 the first planetary nebula to have a hierarchical triple star system at its center. It is currently the only known example of a planetary nebula with more than two central stars.

NGC 246 is not to be confused with the Rosette Nebula (NGC 2237), which is also referred to as the "Skull." Among some amateur astronomers, NGC 246 is known as the "Pac-Man Nebula" because of the arrangement of its central stars and the surrounding star field.

== Image gallery ==
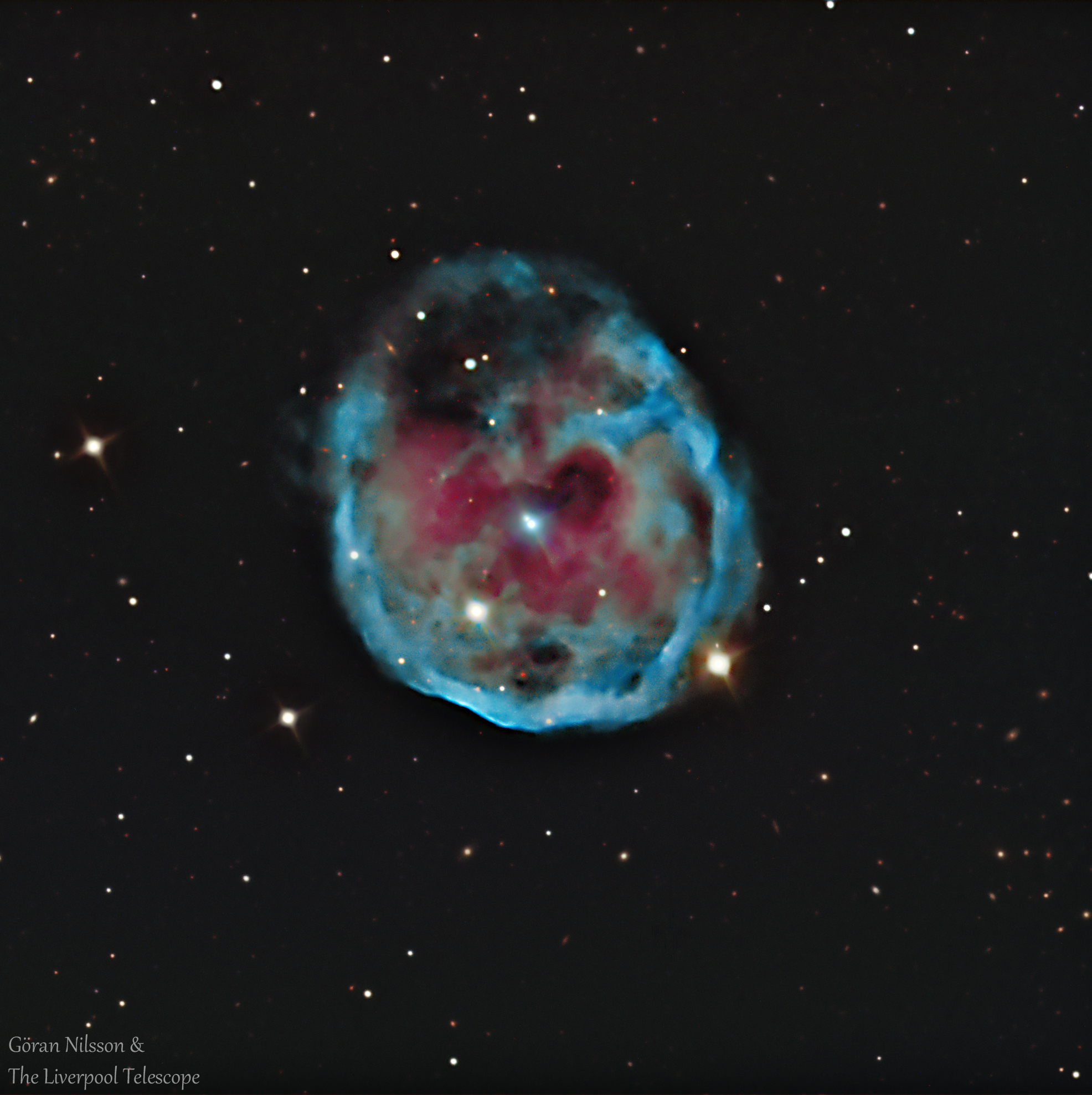
HaRGB image of The Skull Nebula (NGC 246). Data from the Liverpool Telescope, processed by Göran Nilsson. Total exposure time 1.1 hours.

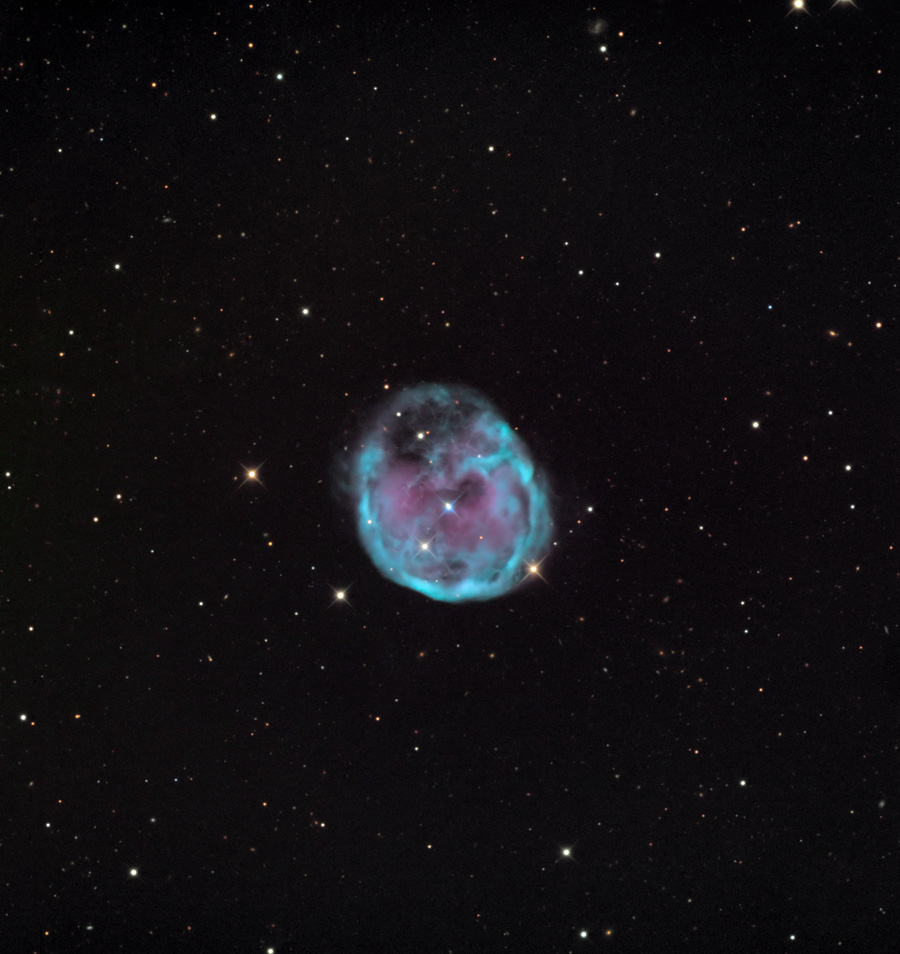
NGC 246 acquired using the Schulman 0.8m Telescope atop Mount Lemmon, AZ. This is a full color (visual) image.
