= NGC 3532 =

Open cluster in the constellation Carina

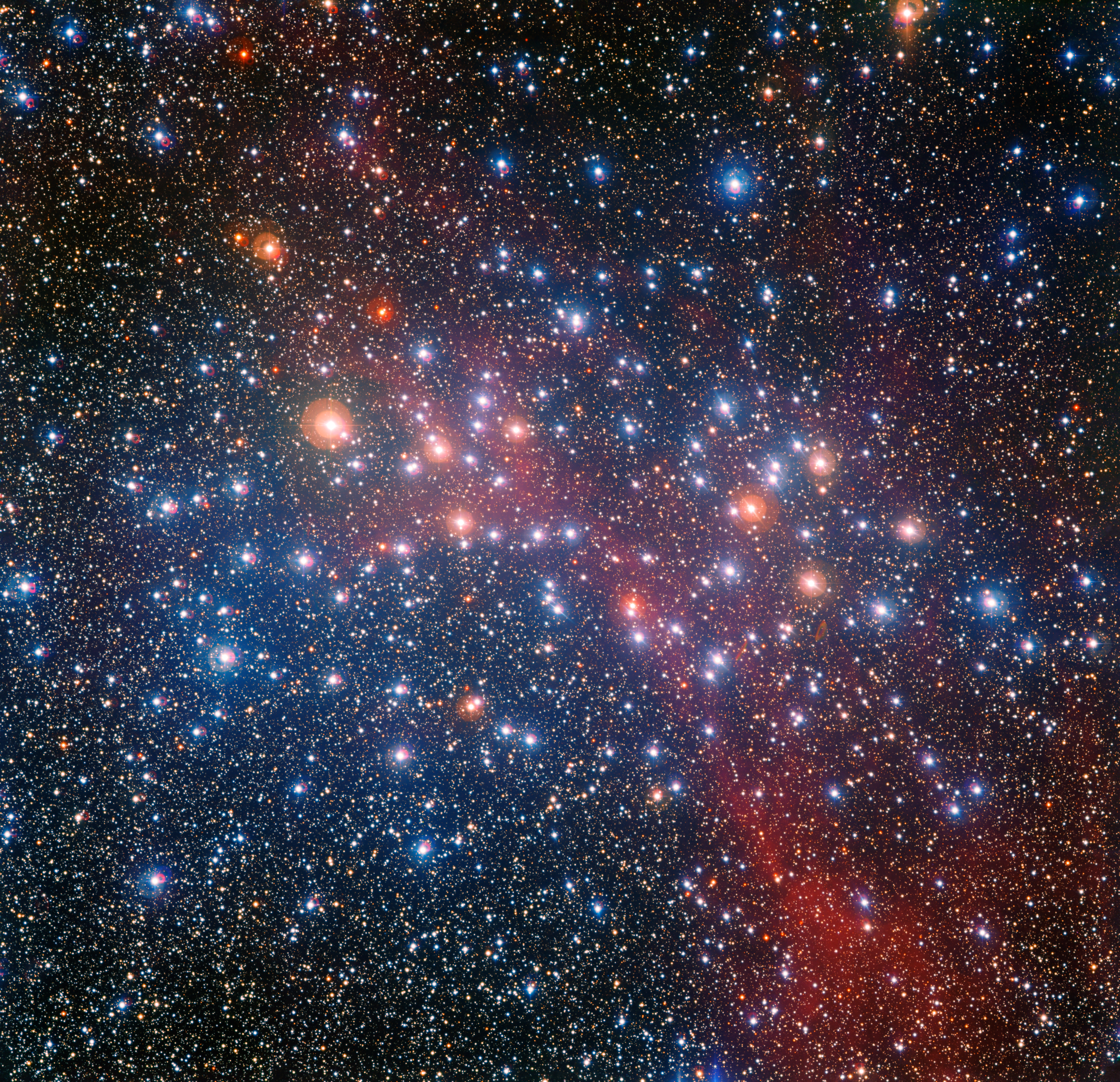

Observation data (J2000 epoch)
- Right ascension: 11^{h} 05^{m} 33^{s}
- Declination: −58° 43.8′
- Distance: 1,321 ly (405 pc)
- Apparent magnitude (V): 3.0
- Apparent dimensions (V): 50′

Physical characteristics
- Other designations: NGC 3532, Caldwell 91, Cr 238, Mel 103, C 1104-584, Cl* 1104-584, CL 1104-584, Lacaille II.10, Football Cluster, Wishing Well Cluster

Associations
- Constellation: Carina

NGC 3532 is an open cluster of stars in the southern constellation of Carina. Alternatively, it is known as Caldwell 91, the Pincushion Cluster, Football Cluster, the Black Arrow Cluster, or the Wishing Well Cluster. This formation is located at a distance of some 1,321 light-years (405 pc) parsecs from Earth. Its population of approximately 150 stars of 7th magnitude or fainter includes seven red giants and seven white dwarfs.

On 20 May 1990 it became the first target ever observed by the Hubble Space Telescope. A line from Beta Crucis through Delta Crucis passes somewhat to the north of NGC 3532. The cluster lies between the constellation Crux and the larger but fainter "False Cross" asterism. The 4th-magnitude Cepheid variable star x Carinae (V382 Car) appears near the southeast fringes, but it lies between the Sun and the cluster and is not a member of the cluster.

The cluster was first catalogued by Nicolas Louis de Lacaille in 1752. It was admired by John Herschel, who thought it one of the finest star clusters in the sky, with many double stars (binary stars).

== Gallery ==
Photos of NGC 3532 by space telescopes
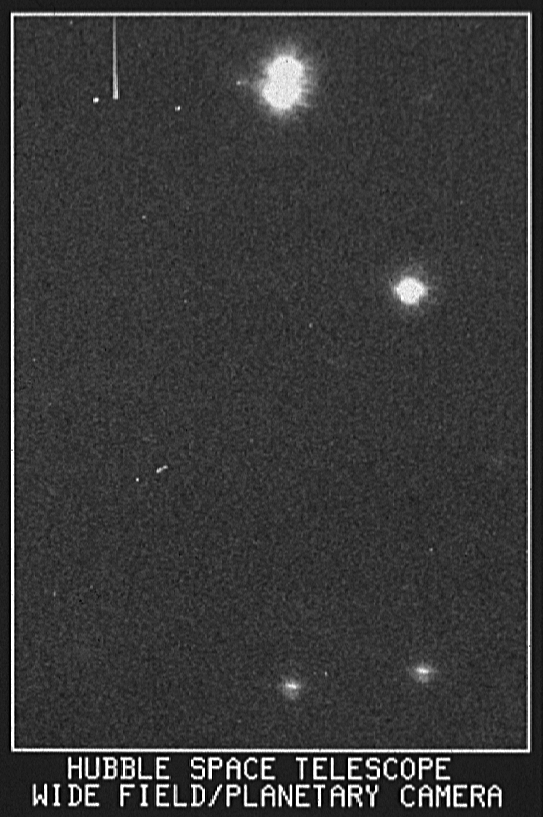
This is the first light image for the Wide Field and Planetary Camera of the Hubble Space Telescope, taken in May 1990; this view is near star HD96755 in the open cluster NGC 3532. This view is 11 by 14 arcseconds of the sky.

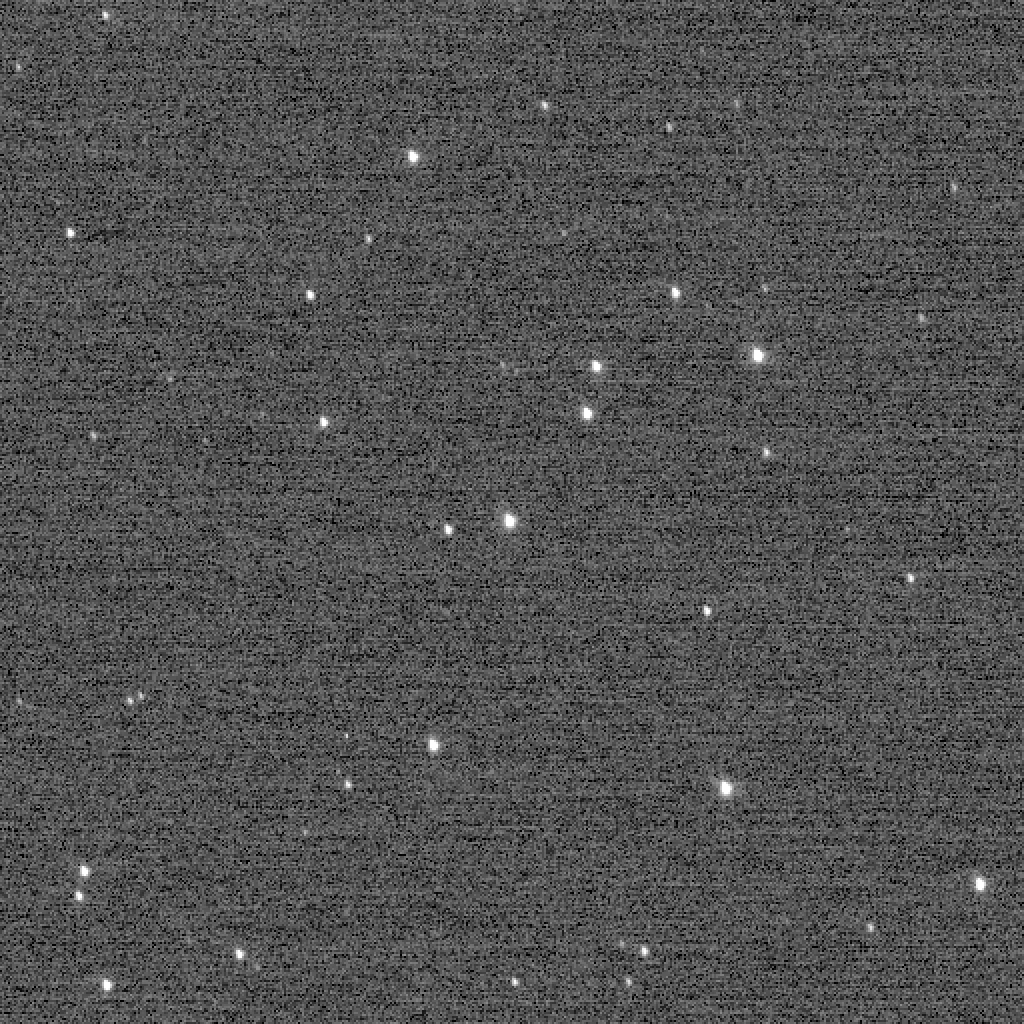
This New Horizons image, taken with the LORRI instrument and captured on December 5, 2017, broke the record for an image taken at the greatest distance from Earth, surpassing Pale Blue Dot taken by Voyager 1.
