= NGC 2516 =

Open cluster in the constellation Carina

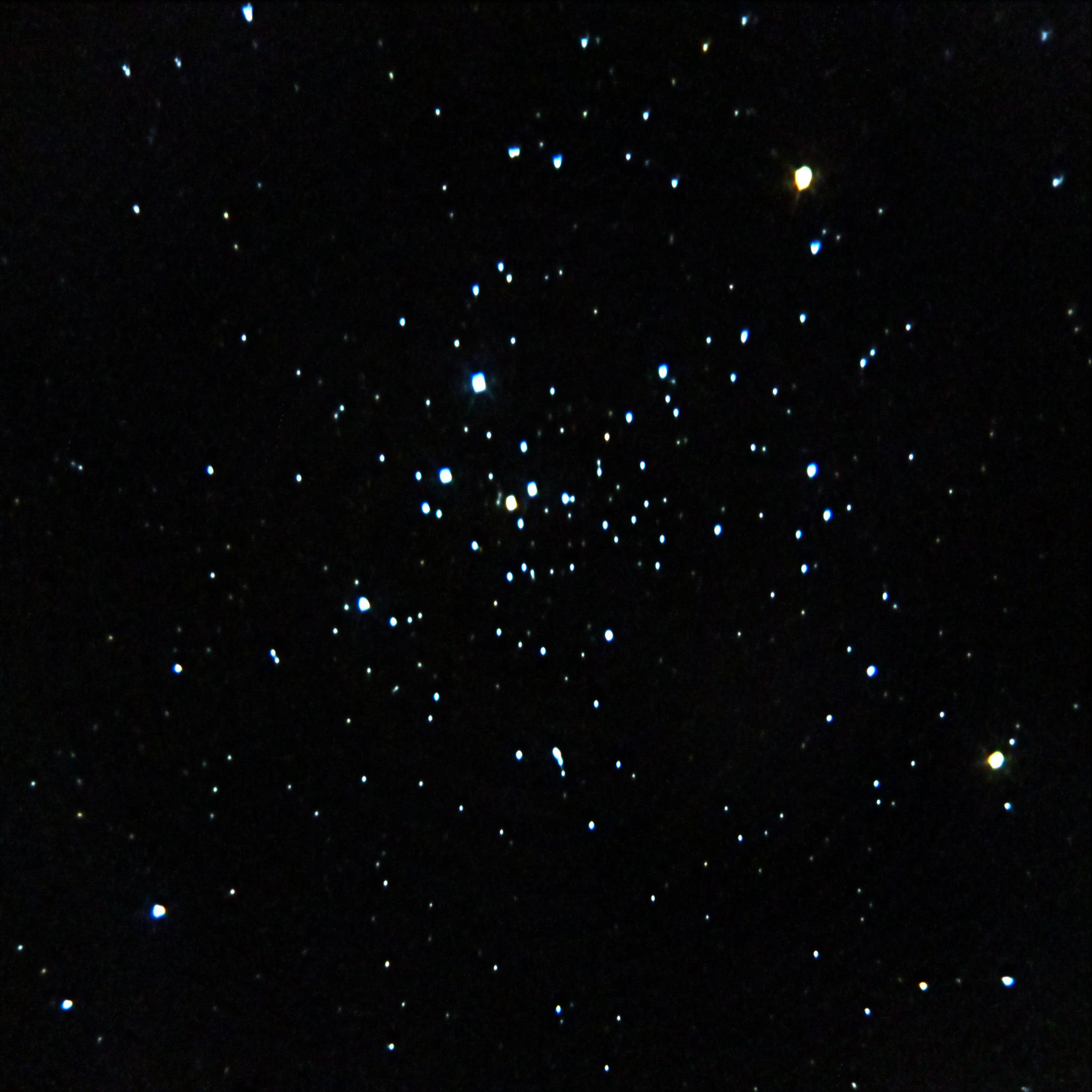
- NGC 2516

Observation data (J2000.0 epoch)
- Right ascension: 07^{h} 58^{m} 20^{s}
- Declination: −60° 52′
- Distance: 1.3 kly
- Apparent magnitude (V): 3.8
- Apparent dimensions (V): 22′

Physical characteristics
- Mass: 10^{5} to 10^{6} M_{☉}
- Other designations: NGC 2516, Caldwell 96, Cr 172

Associations
- Constellation: Carina

NGC 2516 is an open cluster of stars in the southern constellation of Carina. Alternatively, it is called Southern Beehive or the Sprinter, and is catalogued as Caldwell 96. This formation was discovered by French astronomer Abbe Lacaille in 1751-1752.

== Description ==
This bright cluster itself is easily visible with the naked eye as a hazy patch, but is resolvable into stars using binoculars. It contains two 5th magnitude red giant stars and three main visual double stars: HJ 4027, HJ 4031 and I 29. A small telescope would be required to split the double stars, which are all pairs of 8-9 magnitude and 1-10 arcseconds separation.

NGC 2516 and the recently discovered nearby star cluster Mamajek 2 in Ophiuchus have similar age and metallicity. Recently, kinematic evidence was presented by E. Jilinski and coauthors that suggests that these two stellar groups may have formed in the same star-forming complex some 135 million years ago.

The cluster is surrounded by the 500-parsec diameter halo consisting of stars ejected from cluster.

== Bibliography ==
- Burnham, Robert. Burnham's Celestial Handbook. Dover, 1978. ISBN 0-486-23567-X.
