= NGC 4565 =

Galaxy in the constellation Coma Berenices

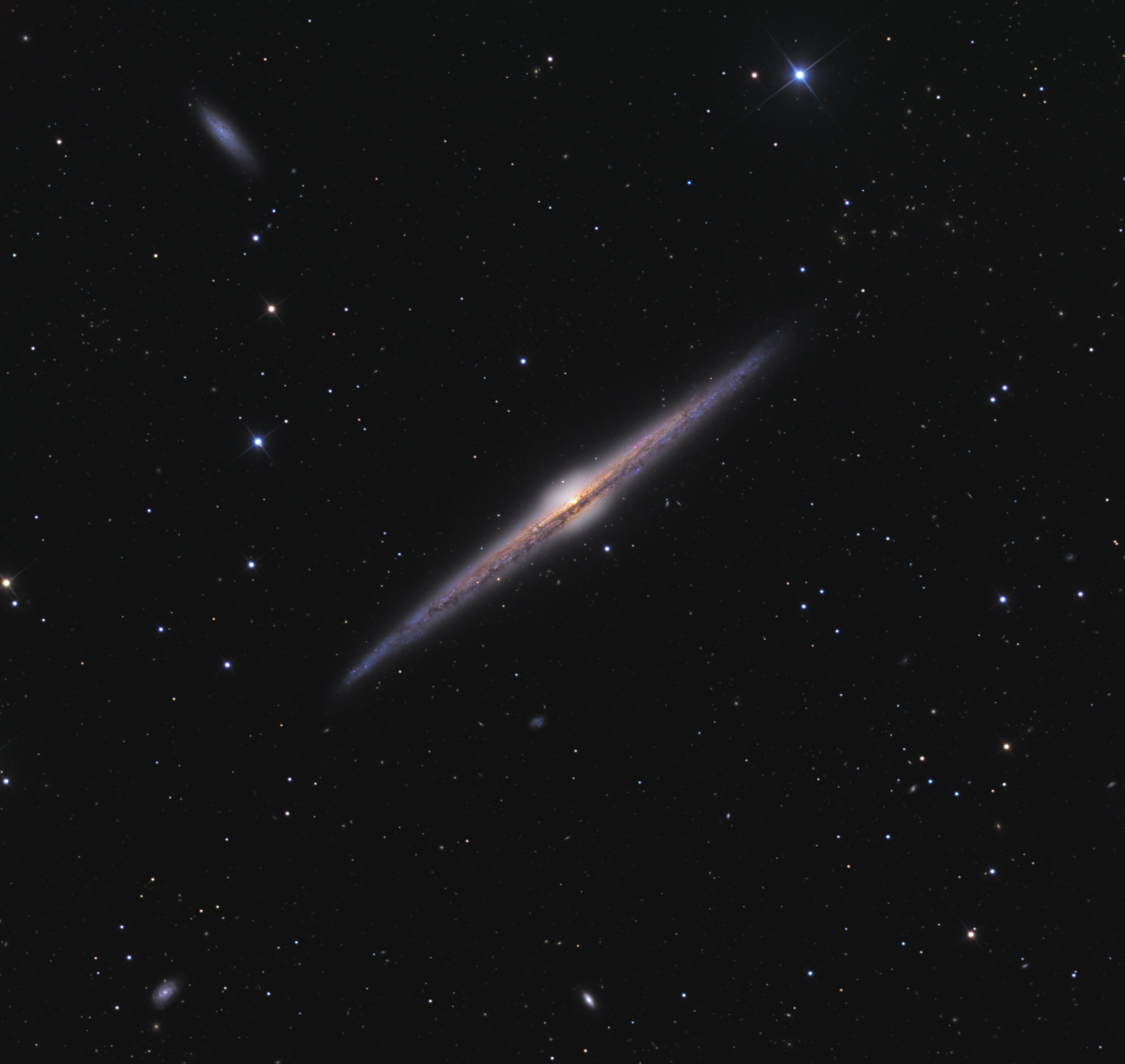
- NGC 4565

Observation data (J2000 epoch)
- Constellation: Coma Berenices
- Right ascension: 12^{h} 36^{m} 20.7710^{s}
- Declination: +25° 59′ 15.678″
- Redshift: 0.004276
- Heliocentric radial velocity: 1282±1 km/s
- Distance: 38.16 ± 2.27 Mly (11.700 ± 0.697 Mpc); 53 ± 4 Mly (16.2 ± 1.2 Mpc)
- Apparent magnitude (V): 9.5

Characteristics
- Type: SA(s)b?
- Size: ~176,000 ly (54 kpc) (diameter; D_{25} isophote)
- Apparent size (V): 15.8′ × 2.1′

Other designations
- Caldwell 38, HOLM 426A, IRAS 12338+2615, NGC 4565, UGC 7772, MCG +04-30-006, PGC 42038, CGCG 129-010

NGC 4565 is an edge-on spiral galaxy in the constellation of Coma Berenices. Alternatively, it is known as the Needle Galaxy, Flying Saucer Galaxy, Berenice's Hair Clip or Caldwell 38. It is located at a distance of about 30 to 50 million light-years away and is positioned close to the North Galactic Pole. NGC 4565 has an apparent visual magnitude of approximately 9.5 with an angular size of 15.8′ × 2.1′. It is a prominent example of an edge-on spiral galaxy, known as the Needle Galaxy for its narrow profile. It was discovered by German-British astronomer William Herschel on 6 April 1785.

== Characteristics ==
NGC 4565 is a giant spiral galaxy more luminous than the Andromeda Galaxy. Much speculation exists concerning the nature of the central bulge. In the absence of clear-cut dynamical data on the motions of stars in the bulge, the photometric data alone cannot adjudge among various options. However, its exponential shape suggested that it is a barred spiral galaxy. Studies with the help of the Spitzer Space Telescope not only confirmed the presence of a central bar but also showed a pseudobulge within it, as well as an inner ring.

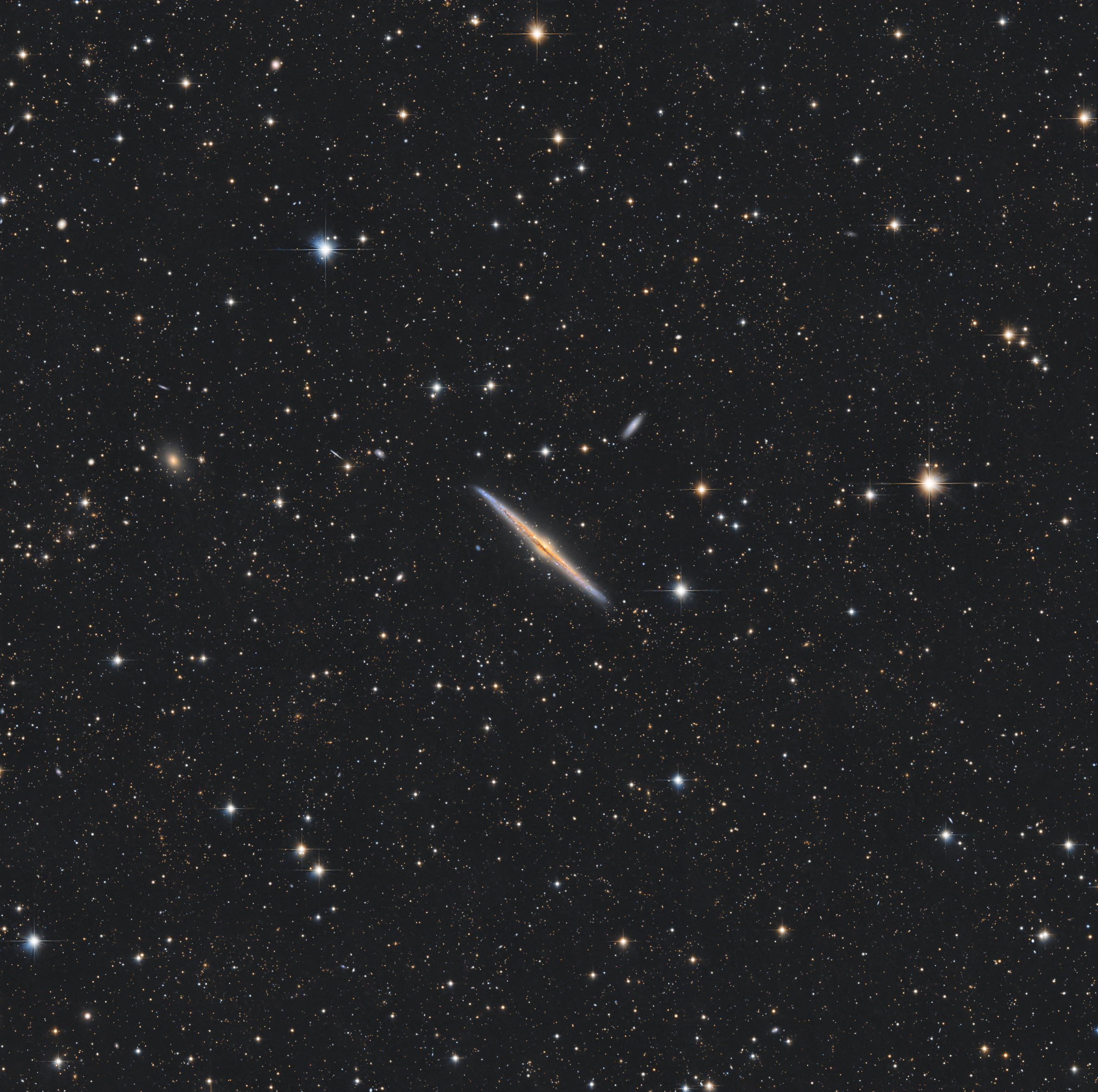
This is a wide field view of the Needle Galaxy captured in March 2025.

This edge-on galaxy exhibits a slightly warped and extended disk under deep optical surveys, likely due to ongoing interaction with neighboring satellite galaxies or other galaxies in the Coma I group. GALEX images show the slight warp at the edge of the disc more clearly than other surveys.

Using the LOw-Frequency ARray (LOFAR), astronomers of the University of Hamburg discovered a diffuse radio halo around NGC 4565. During the observations, a warp was detected in the radio continuum of NGC 4565 that is reminiscent of a neutral hydrogen line (HI) warp and identifying a slight flaring of the galaxy's radio halo. It is assumed that this flaring is caused by the warp, as the vertical intensity profiles are asymmetric in agreement with the warp. According to the study, a minimum age for the warp was estimated at approximately 130 million years. This is the spectral age of the galaxy's cosmic ray electrons, during which they are transported into the warp. This indicates that NGC 4565 may be in the aftermath of a period with more intense star formation, likely caused by interaction with one or both satellites. An HI bridge extending from NGC 4565 to IC 3571 also implies that an interaction has happened recently in cosmic terms.

Using the Chandra X-ray Observatory scientists found a possible weak AGN but it is highly debated.

== Galaxy Groups ==
NGC 4565, along with NGC 4562, IC 3543, and IC 3546, are listed together as Holm 426 in Erik Holmberg's A Study of Double and Multiple Galaxies Together with Inquiries into some General Metagalactic Problems, published in 1937.

NGC 4565 has at least two satellite galaxies, NGC 4562 and IC 3571, one of which is interacting with it. It has a population of roughly 240 globular clusters, more than the Milky Way.

NGC 4565 is one of the brightest galaxies of the Coma I Group.

== Gallery ==
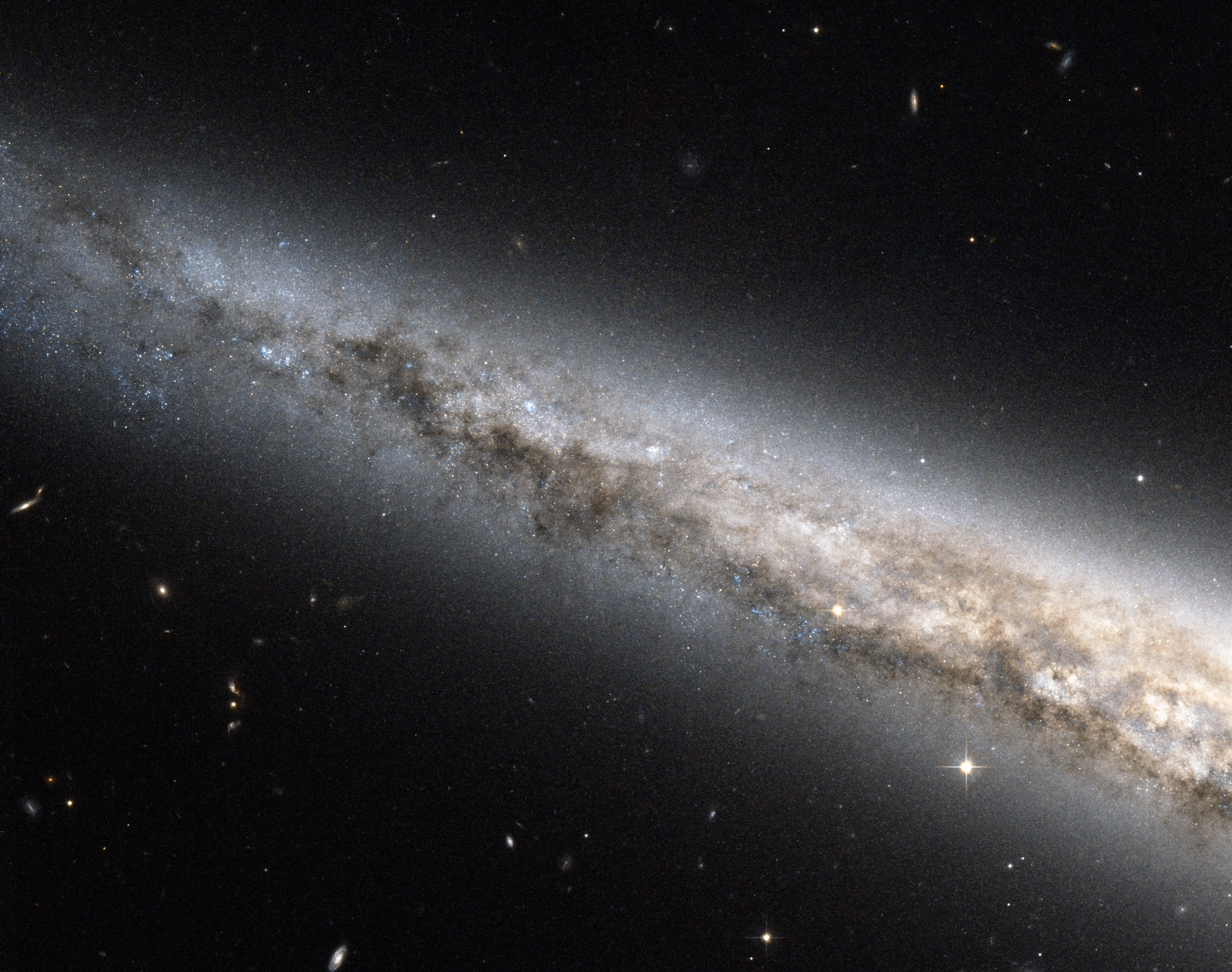
A detailed view of part of the disc of the spiral galaxy NGC 4565, imaged by the Hubble Space Telescope

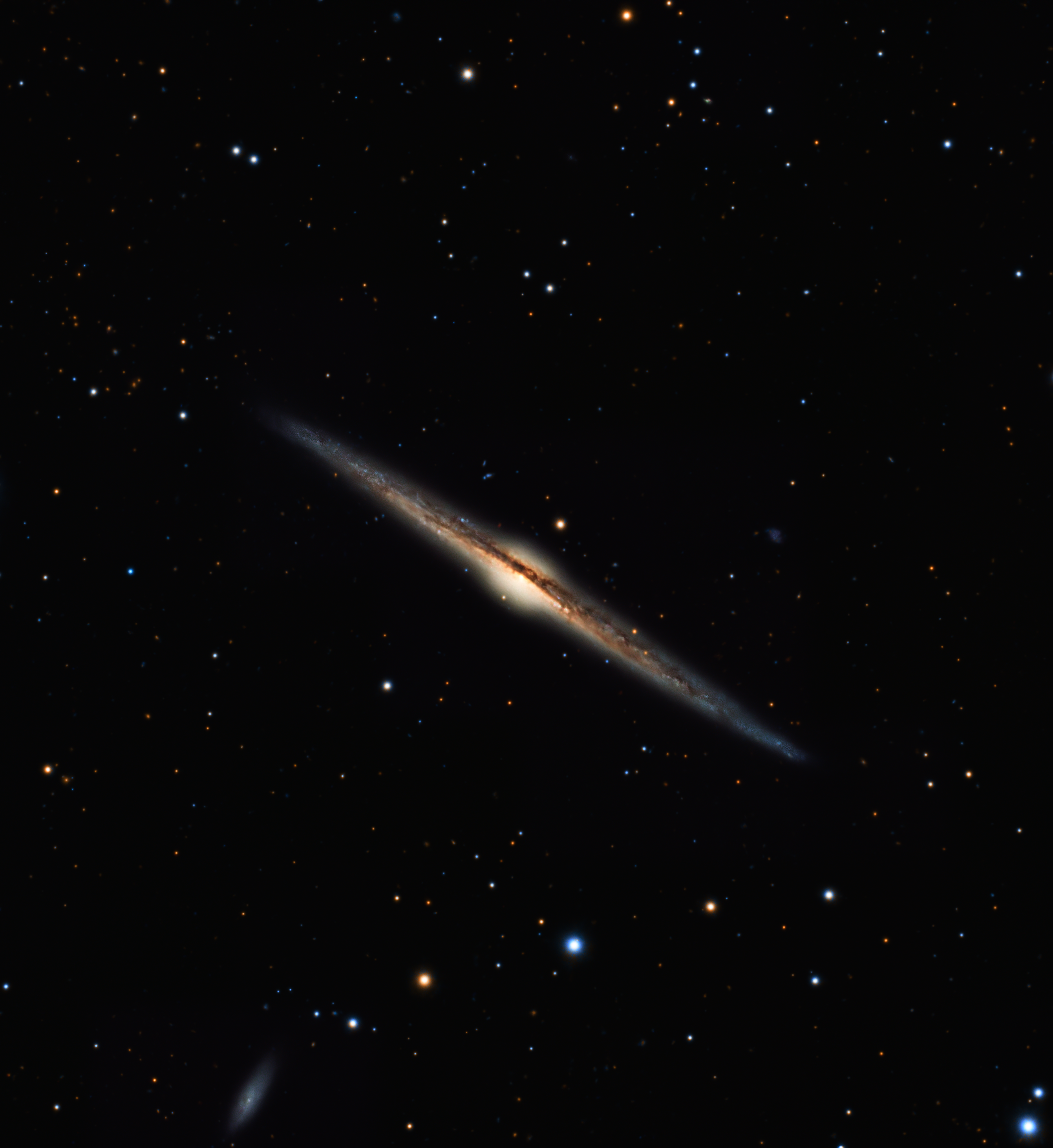
The Needle Galaxy NGC 4565 taken in France by amateur astrophotographer Anthony MICHEL

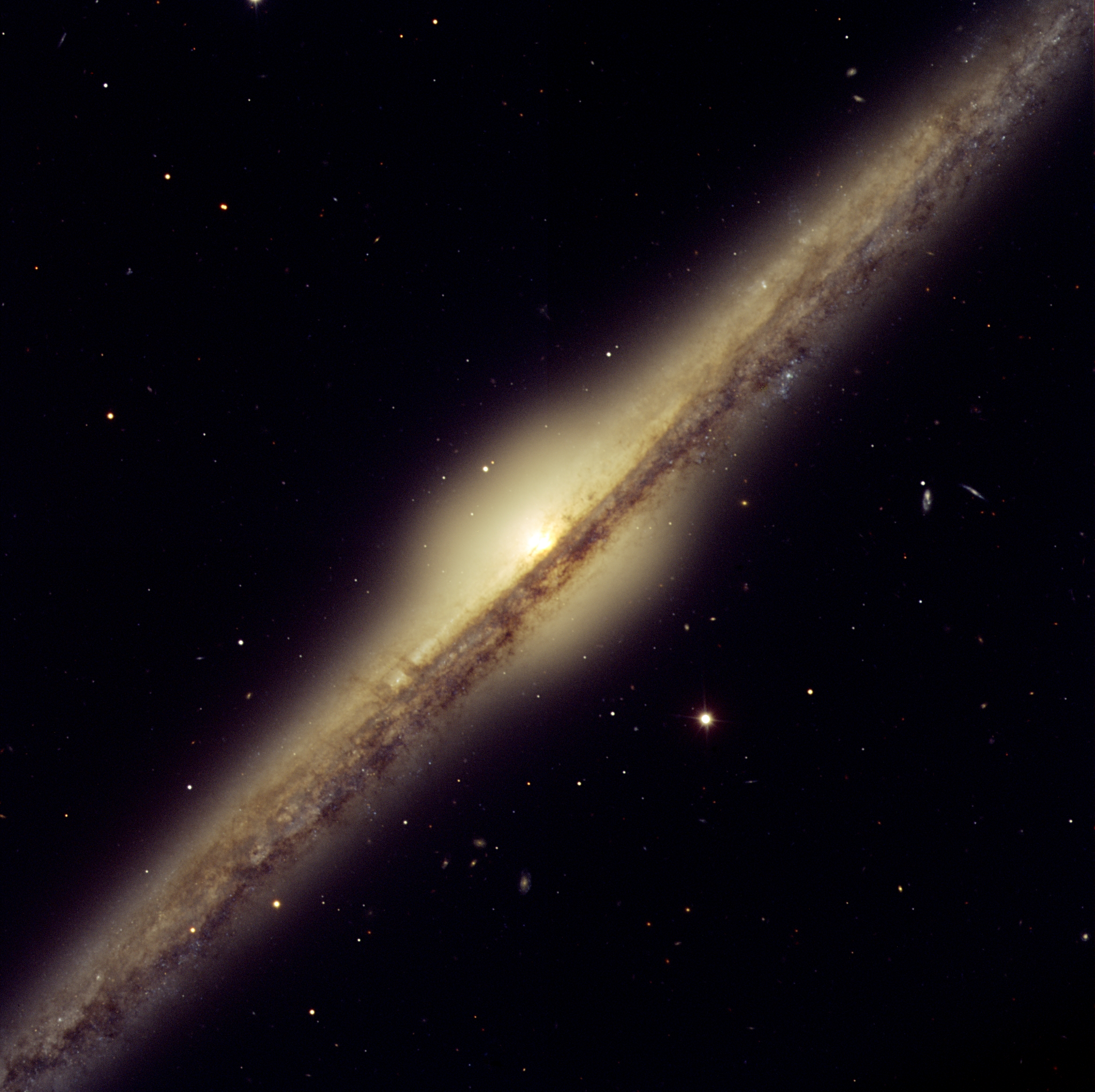
View of the central bulge of the spiral Galaxy NGC 4565 taken by the FORS instrument

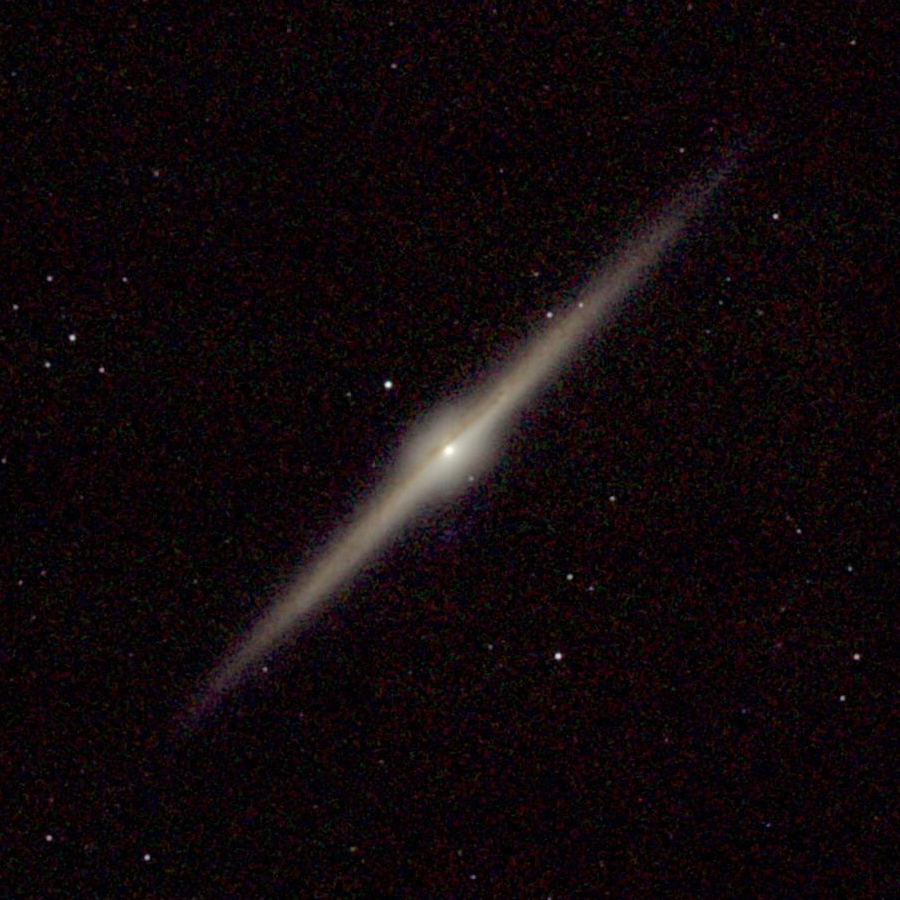
A view of the galaxy NGC 4565 in NIR (Near Infrared) by the Two Micron All Sky Survey (2MASS)

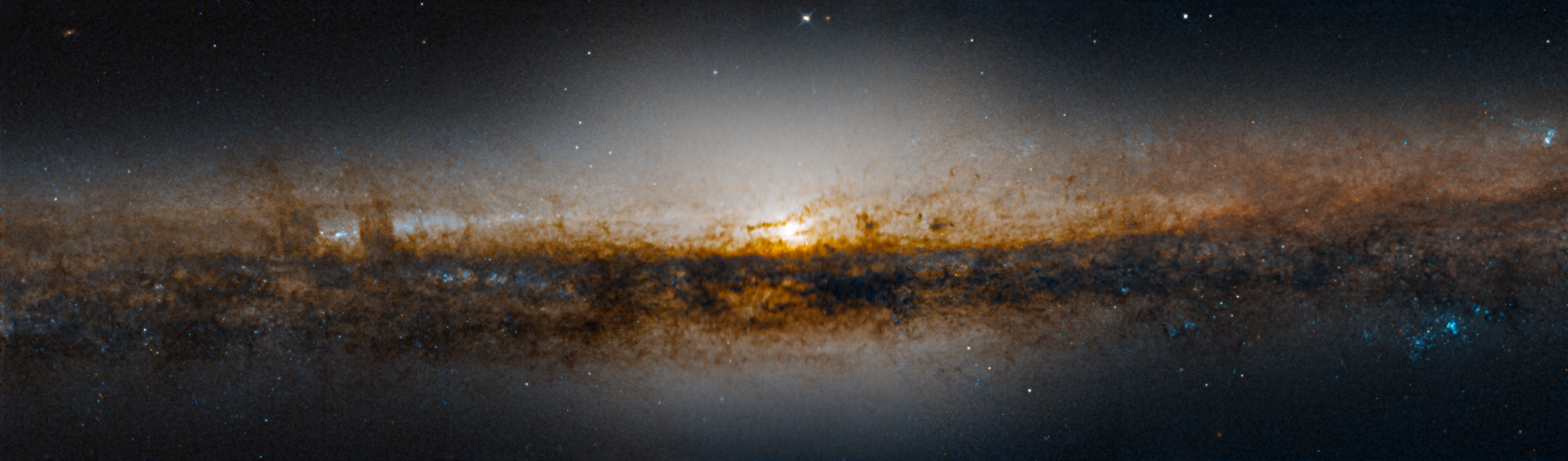
A photo of the central bulge of NGC 4565 by the Hubble Space Telescope.

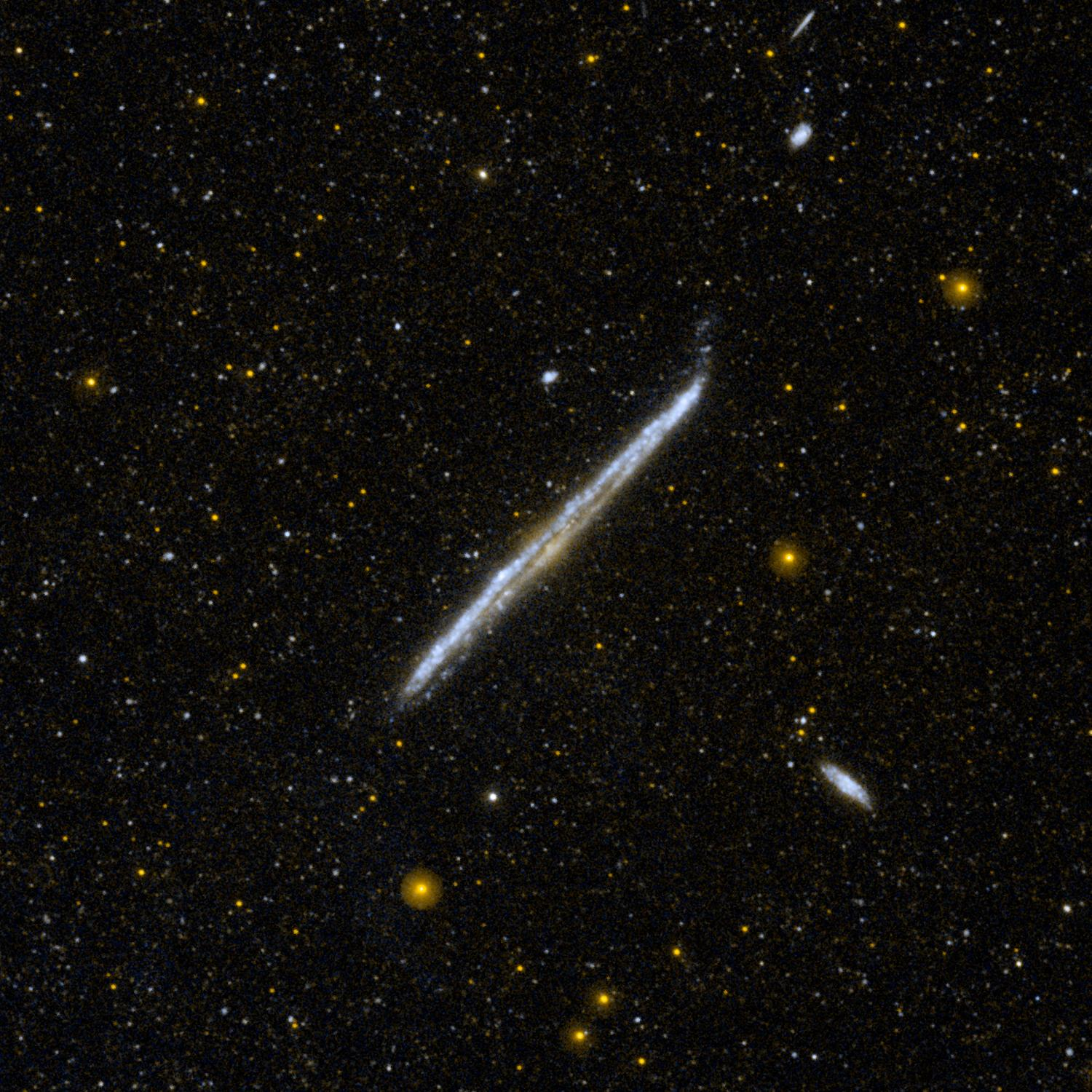
NGC 4565 in Ultraviolet by GALEX.

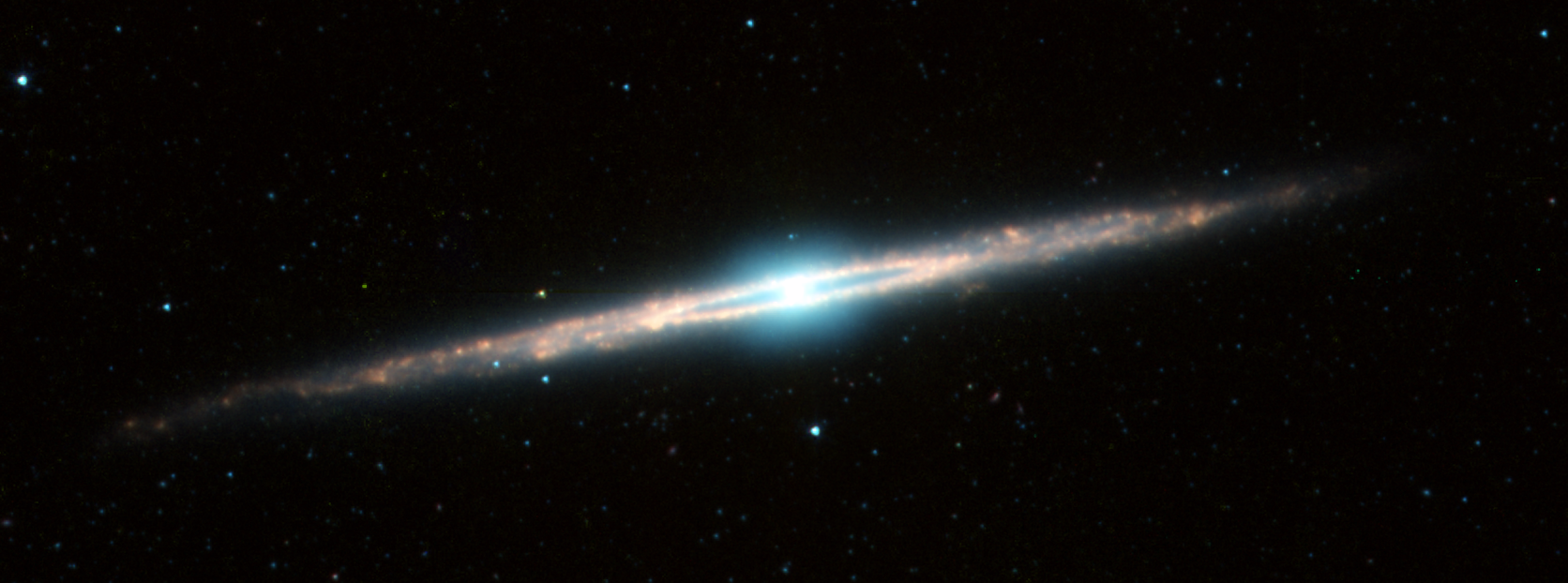
A photo of NGC 4565 in Mid-Infrared using the Spitzer Space Telescope (Notice there is a ring that glows near the core, that is a region with higher amounts of star formation compared to the rest of NGC 4565)

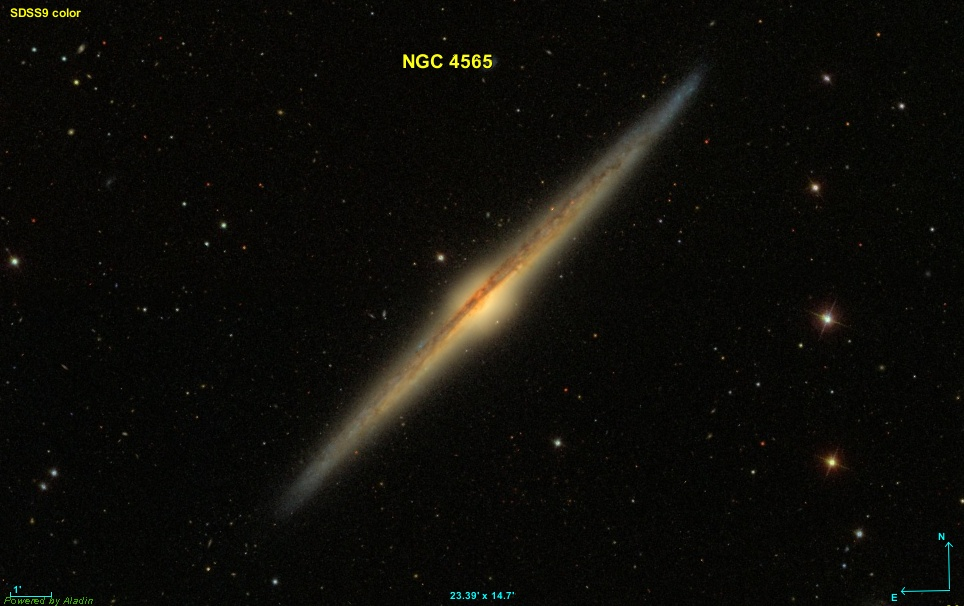
NGC 4565 taken in the SDSS Sky Survey

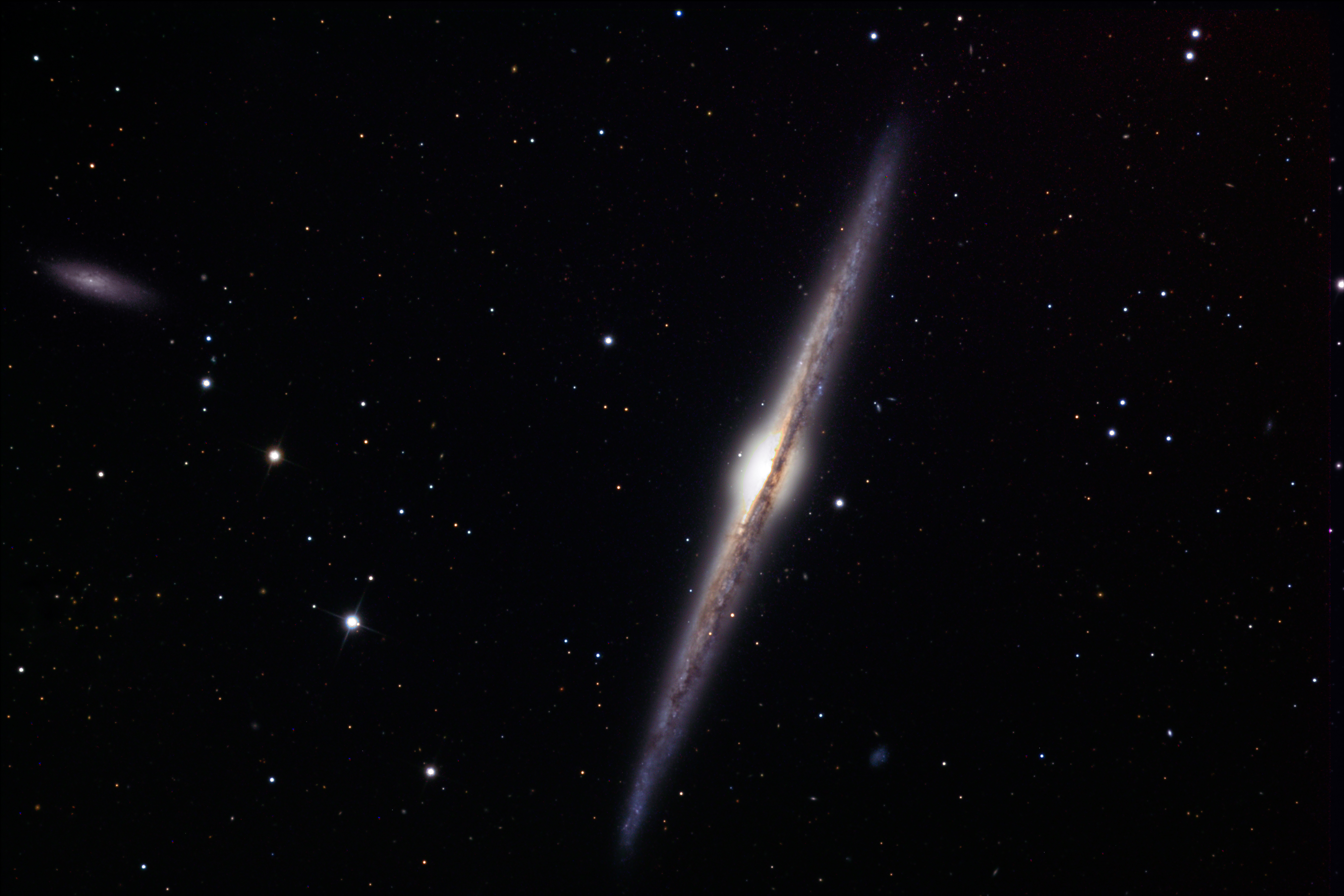
NGC 4565 and NGC 4562

NGC 4565 and IC 3571 (PGC 2793674)
