= NGC 559 =

Open star cluster in the constellation Cassiopeia

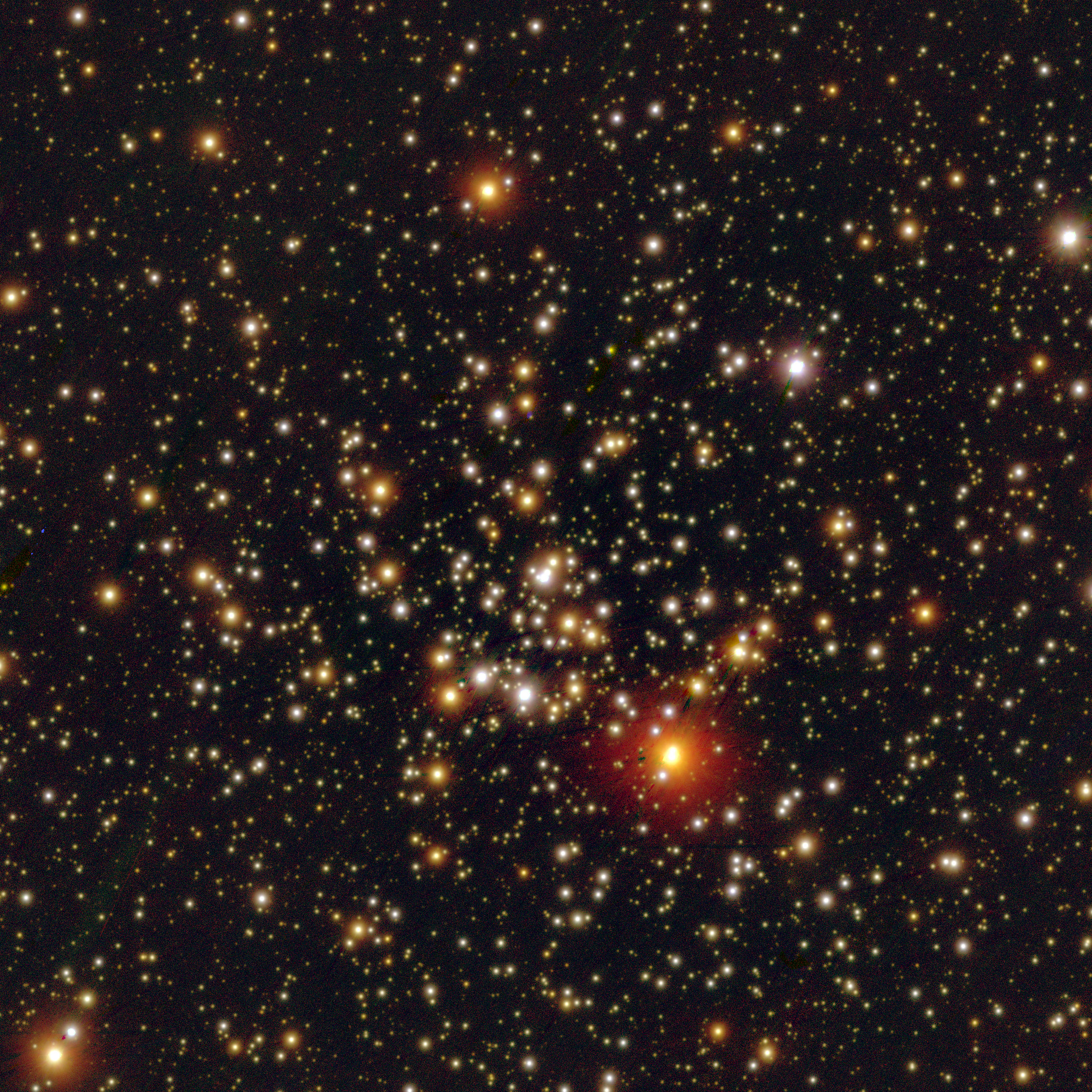
- PanSTARRS image of NGC 559

Observation data (J2000 epoch)
- Right ascension: 01^{h} 29^{m} 31.20^{s}
- Declination: +63° 18′ 07.2″
- Distance: 7200 ly (2200 pc)
- Apparent magnitude (V): +9.5
- Apparent dimensions (V): 7′

Physical characteristics
- Other designations: Caldwell 8, Cr 13

Associations
- Constellation: Cassiopeia

NGC 559 (also known as Caldwell 8) is an open cluster and Caldwell object in the northern constellation of Cassiopeia. It shines at magnitude +9.5. Its celestial coordinates are RA 01^{h} 29.5^{m} , dec +63° 18′. It is located near the open cluster NGC 637, and the bright magnitude +2.2 irregular variable star Gamma Cassiopeiae. The cluster is 7 arcmins across.

It was discovered by William Herschel in 1787.

The object is also called Ghost's Goblet. This name was coined by astronomer Stephen J. O'Meara, as the center of the star cluster, with a little imagination, is reminiscent of a still photograph of a jeweled goblet that is about to vanish in a ghostly manner. O'Meara attributes the impression of fading to the low brightness (about +12) of many stars in the center as well as to the great age of the star cluster, which is about 1.8 billion years old.

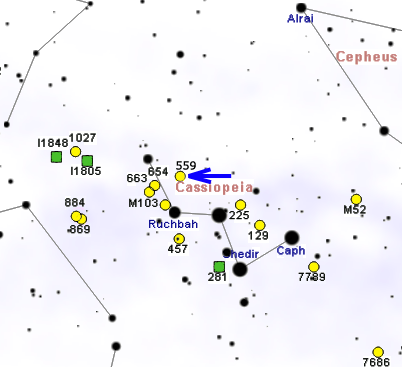
Map showing the location of NGC 559
