= NGC 3242 =

Planetary nebula in the constellation Hydra

Emission nebula
- Planetary nebula
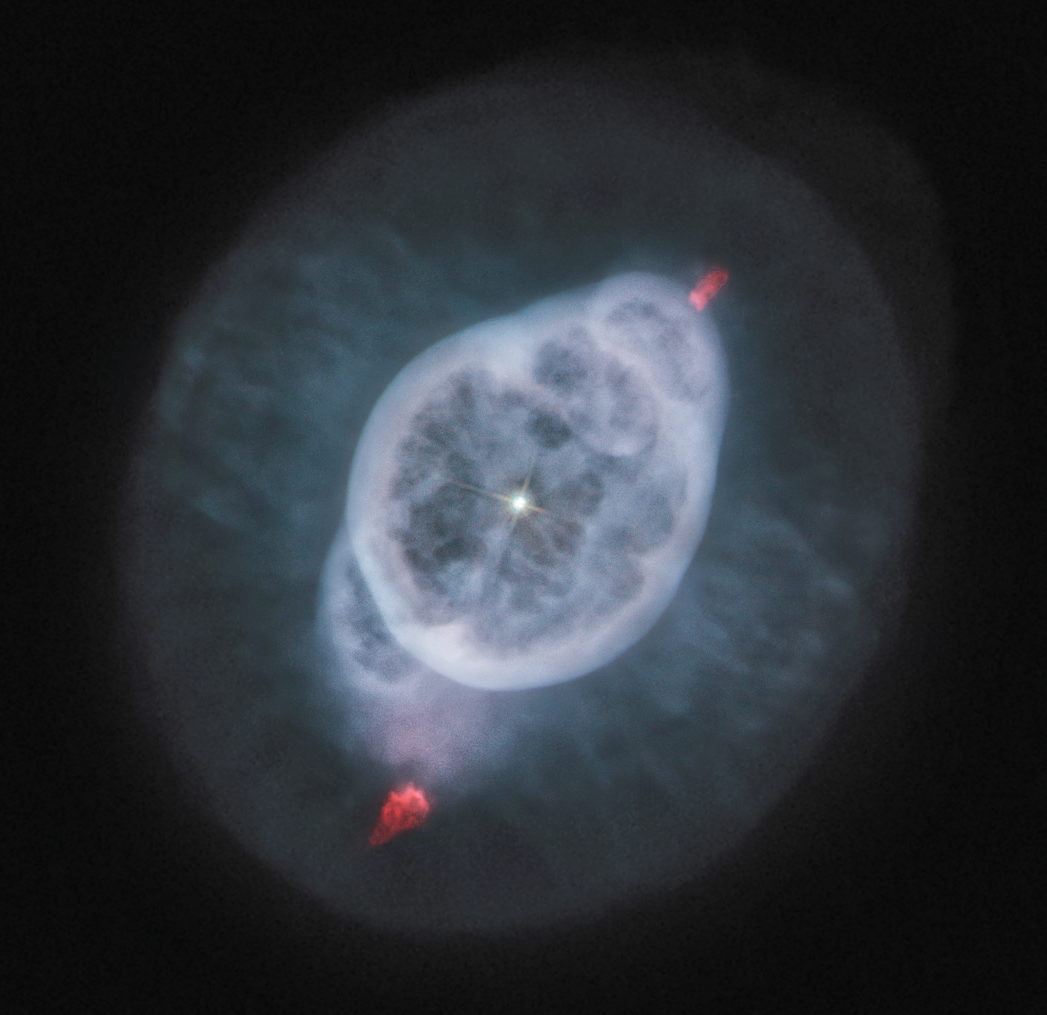
- A Hubble Space Telescope (HST) image of core region of NGC 3242. Credit: HST/NASA/ESA.

Observation data: J2000 epoch
- Right ascension: 10^{h} 24^{m} 46.1^{s}
- Declination: −18° 38′ 32.6″
- Distance: 4,800±500 ly
- Apparent magnitude (V): 7.7
- Apparent dimensions (V): 40″
- Constellation: Hydra
- Designations: Ghost of Jupiter, Jupiter's Ghost, Eye Nebula, Caldwell 59

NGC 3242 is a planetary nebula located in the constellation Hydra. Alternatively, it is known as the Ghost of Jupiter, Eye Nebula or Caldwell 59. William Herschel discovered the nebula on February 7, 1785, and catalogued it as H IV.27. John Herschel observed it from the Cape of Good Hope, South Africa, in the 1830s, and numbered it as h 3248, and included it in the 1864 General Catalogue as GC 2102; this became NGC 3242 in J. L. E. Dreyer's New General Catalogue of 1888.

This planetary nebula is most frequently called the Ghost of Jupiter, or Jupiter's Ghost due to its similar shape to the planet, but it is also sometimes referred to as the Eye Nebula. The nebula measures around two light years long from end to end, and contains a central white dwarf with an apparent magnitude of 11. The inner layers of the nebula were formed some 1,500 years ago. The two ends of the nebula are marked by FLIERs, lobes of fast moving gas often tinted red in false-color pictures. NGC 3242 can easily be observed with amateur telescopes and appears bluish-green to most observers. Larger telescopes can distinguish the outer halo as well.

At the center of NGC 3242 is an O-type star with a spectral type of O(H).

== Gallery ==
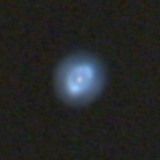
Imaged with a 10" Schmidt-Cassegrain telescope

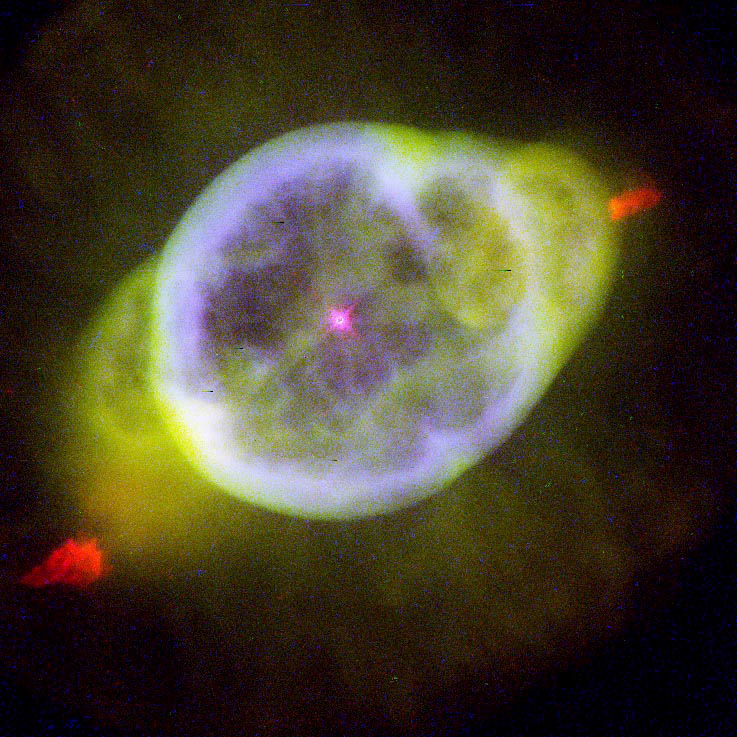
A different Hubble image of the core region

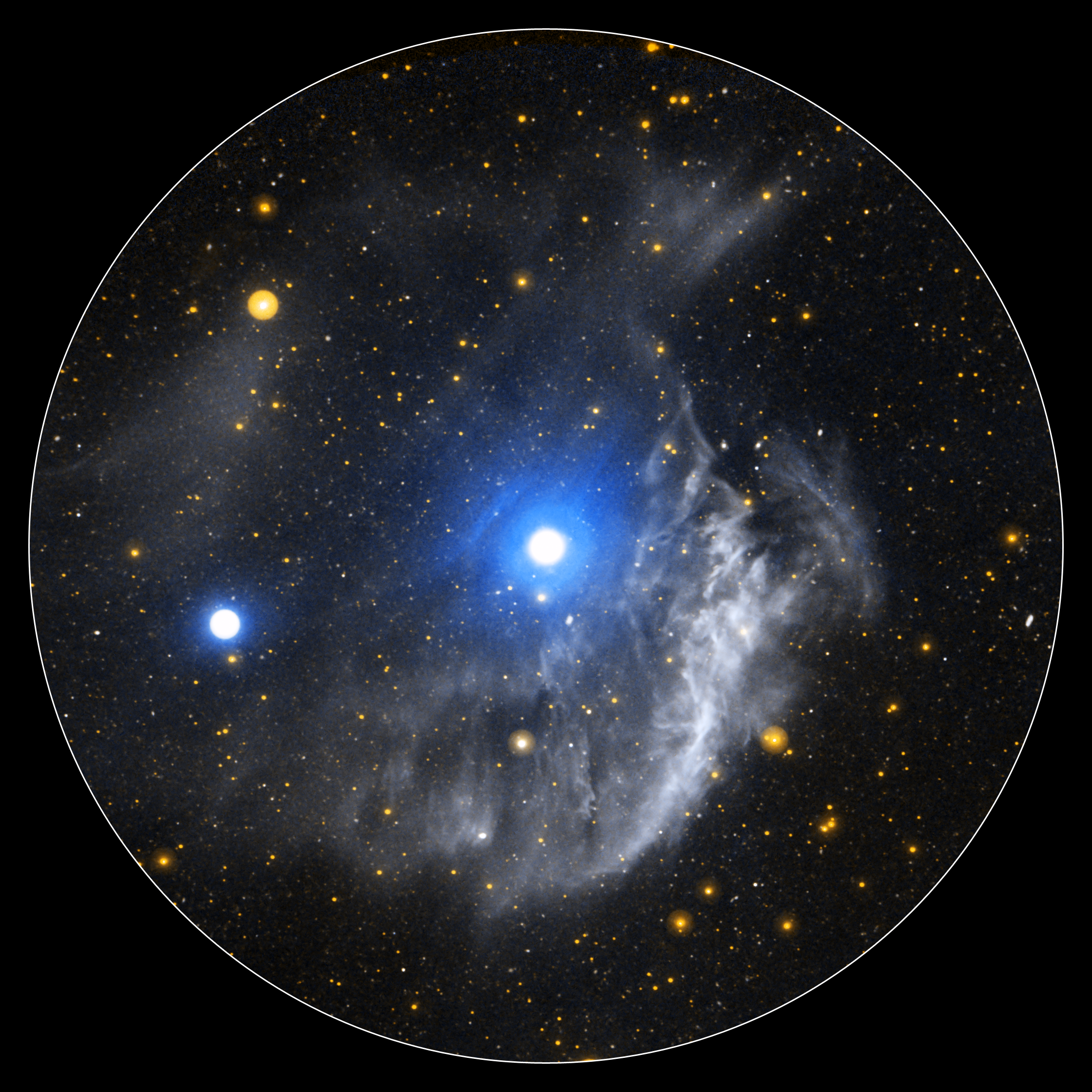
Ultraviolet image from NASA's Galaxy Evolution Explorer

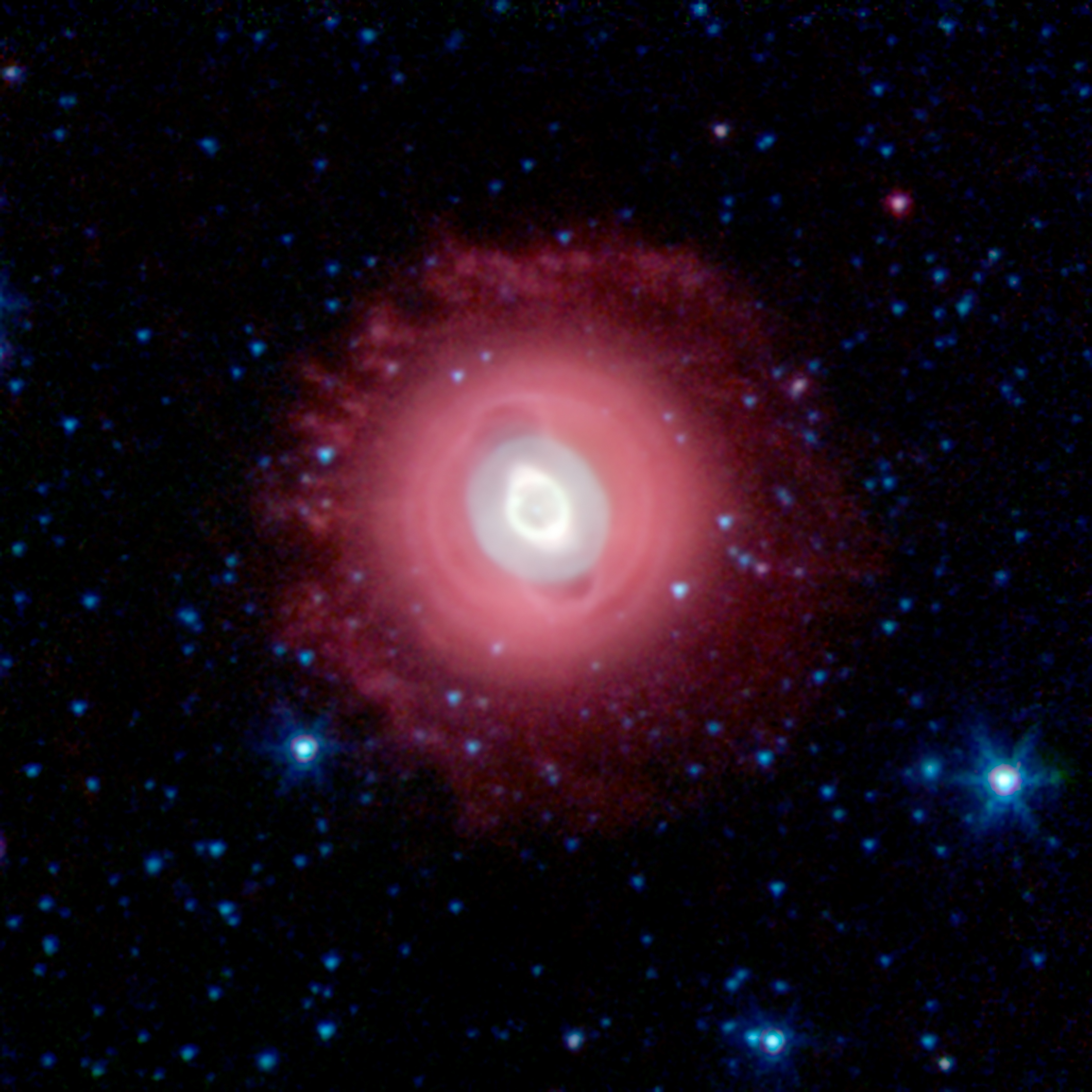
Infrared, Spitzer Space Telescope

== See also ==
- List of planetary nebulae
- List of NGC objects
