= Herschel 400 Catalogue =

Catalogue of astronomical objects

The Herschel 400 catalogue is a subset of William Herschel's original Catalogue of Nebulae and Clusters of Stars, selected by Brenda F. Guzman (Branchett), Lydel Guzman, Paul Jones, James Morris, Peggy Taylor and Sara Saey of the Ancient City Astronomy Club in St. Augustine, Florida, United States c. 1980. They decided to generate the list after reading a letter published in Sky & Telescope by James Mullaney of Pittsburgh, Pennsylvania, United States.

In this letter, Mullaney suggested that William Herschel's original catalogue of 2,500 objects would be an excellent basis for deep-sky object selection for amateur astronomers looking for a challenge after completing the Messier Catalogue.

The Herschel 400 is a subset of John Herschel's General Catalogue of Nebulae and Clusters published in 1864 of 5,000 objects, and hence also of the New General Catalogue.

The catalogue forms the basis of the Astronomical League's Herschel 400 club. In 1997, another subset of 400 Herschel objects was selected by the Rose City Astronomers of Portland, Oregon as the Herschel II list, which forms the basis of the Astronomical League's Herschel II Program.

== Basic facts ==
- The catalogue contains 400 objects.
- All objects are from the NGC (New General Catalogue).
- All objects are visible in mid-northern latitudes, since they were all observed by Herschel from England.
- All objects are visible in 150 mm (6") or larger telescopes.

== Distribution of Herschel 400 objects ==
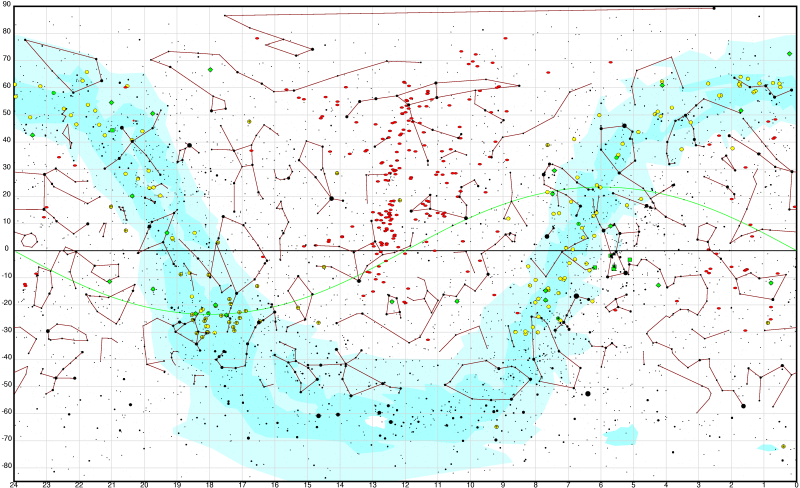
Distribution of Herschel 400 objects Red = Galaxies, Green = Nebulae, Yellow = Star Clusters

Labeled chart of Herschel 400 objects

== Herschel 400 objects that are also Messier objects ==
The Herschel 400 contains 17 objects that are part of the Messier catalogue:

Messier	NGC	Common name	Notes
M20	NGC 6514	Trifid Nebula	
M33	NGC 598	Triangulum Galaxy	
M47	NGC 2422		
M48	NGC 2548		
M51b	NGC 5195		companion to the Whirlpool Galaxy
M61	NGC 4303	Swelling Spiral Galaxy	
M76	NGC 651	Little Dumbbell Nebula, Barbell Nebula (northern portion)	
M82	NGC 3034	Cigar Galaxy	
M91	NGC 4548		
M102?	NGC 5866	Spindle Galaxy	uncertain Messier object designation
M104	NGC 4594	Sombrero Galaxy	
M105	NGC 3379		
M106	NGC 4258		
M107	NGC 6171	Crucifix Cluster	
M108	NGC 3556	Surfboard Galaxy	
M109	NGC 3992	Vacuum Cleaner Galaxy	
M110	NGC 205		

== Herschel 400 objects that are also Caldwell objects ==
The Herschel 400 catalogue pre-dates the Caldwell catalogue by about 15 years. The Caldwell catalogue contains 44 objects that are members of the Herschel 400:

Caldwell	NGC	Common name
C2	NGC 40	Bow-Tie Nebula
C6	NGC 6543	Cat's Eye Nebula
C7	NGC 2403	
C8	NGC 559	
C10	NGC 663	
C12	NGC 6946	Fireworks Galaxy
C13	NGC 457	Owl Cluster
C14	NGC 869	Double Cluster
C15	NGC 6826	Blinking Planetary
C16	NGC 7243	
C18	NGC 185	
C20	NGC 7000	North America Nebula
C21	NGC 4449	
C22	NGC 7662	Blue Snowball
C23	NGC 891	Silver Sliver Galaxy
C25	NGC 2419	
C28	NGC 752	
C29	NGC 5005	
C30	NGC 7331	
C32	NGC 4631	Whale Galaxy
C36	NGC 4559	
C37	NGC 6885	
C38	NGC 4565	Needle Galaxy
C39	NGC 2392	Eskimo Nebula, Clown Face Nebula
C40	NGC 3626	
C42	NGC 7006	
C43	NGC 7814	
C44	NGC 7479	
C45	NGC 5248	
C47	NGC 6934	
C48	NGC 2775	
C50	NGC 2244	Satellite Cluster
C52	NGC 4697	
C53	NGC 3115	Spindle Galaxy
C54	NGC 2506	
C55	NGC 7009	Saturn Nebula
C56	NGC 246	Skull Nebula
C58	NGC 2360	Caroline's Cluster
C59	NGC 3242	Ghost of Jupiter
C60	NGC 4038	brighter of two Antennae Galaxies
C62	NGC 247	
C64	NGC 2362	Tau Canis Majoris Cluster
C65	NGC 253	Sculptor Galaxy, Silver Coin Galaxy
C66	NGC 5694	

== Number of objects by type in the Herschel 400 ==
Type of object	Number of objects
Galaxies	231
Globular clusters	34
Nebulae	6
Star clusters	100
Star clusters and nebulae	5
Planetary nebulae	24
Total	400

== Number of Herschel 400 objects in each constellation ==
Constellation	No. of objects
Andromeda	6
Aquarius	4
Aquila	3
Aries	1
Auriga	6
Boötes	5
Camelopardalis	5
Cancer	1
Canes Venatici	17
Canis Major	4

Constellation	No. of objects
Cassiopeia	16
Cepheus	7
Cetus	13
Coma Berenices	24
Corvus	3
Crater	1
Cygnus	10
Delphinus	3
Draco	5
Eridanus	3

Constellation	No. of objects
Gemini	10
Hercules	2
Hydra	5
Lacerta	3
Leo	23
Leo Minor	10
Lepus	1
Libra	1
Lynx	3
Monoceros	14

Constellation	No. of objects
Ophiuchus	15
Orion	8
Pegasus	5
Perseus	10
Pisces	2
Puppis	13
Pyxis	2
Sagittarius	18
Scorpius	2
Sculptor	3

Constellation	No. of objects
Scutum	2
Serpens	1
Sextans	4
Taurus	2
Triangulum	1
Ursa Major	46
Ursa Minor	1
Virgo	50
Vulpecula	6

== Herschel 400 objects ==
=== Key ===
Open cluster Globular cluster Diffuse nebula Planetary nebula Galaxy

=== 1–100 ===
Messier or Caldwell ID	NGC number	Common name	Image	Object type	Distance (kly)	Constellation	Apparent magnitude
C2	NGC 40	Bow-Tie Nebula		Planetary Nebula	3.5	Cepheus	11
–	NGC 129			Open Cluster	6.0	Cassiopeia	6.5
–	NGC 136			Open Cluster	18.6	Cassiopeia	11
–	NGC 157			Galaxy	75,000	Cetus	10.4
C18	NGC 185			Galaxy	2,300	Cassiopeia	9.2
M110	NGC 205			Galaxy	2,200	Andromeda	8
–	NGC 225			Open Cluster	2.1	Cassiopeia	7
C56	NGC 246	Skull Nebula		Planetary Nebula	1.6	Cetus	8
C62	NGC 247			Galaxy	6,800	Cetus	8.9
C65	NGC 253	Sculptor Galaxy; Silver Coin Galaxy		Galaxy	9,800	Sculptor	7.1
–	NGC 278			Galaxy	38,500	Cassiopeia	10.9
–	NGC 288			Globular Cluster	28.7	Sculptor	8.1
–	NGC 381			Open Cluster	3.8	Cassiopeia	9
–	NGC 404			Galaxy	10,000	Andromeda	10.1
–	NGC 436			Open Cluster	13.0	Cassiopeia	8.8
C13	NGC 457	ET Cluster; Owl Cluster		Open Cluster	9	Cassiopeia	6.4
–	NGC 488			Galaxy	90,000	Pisces	10.3
–	NGC 524			Galaxy	90,000	Pisces	10.6
C8	NGC 559			Open Cluster	3.7	Cassiopeia	9.5
–	NGC 584			Galaxy	60,000	Cetus	10.4
–	NGC 596			Galaxy	65,000	Cetus	10.9
M33	NGC 598	Triangulum Galaxy		Galaxy	2,590	Triangulum	5.7
–	NGC 613			Galaxy	67,000	Sculptor	10
–	NGC 615			Galaxy	70,000	Cetus	11.5
–	NGC 637			Open Cluster	7	Cassiopeia	8.2
M76	NGC 650/651	Little Dumbbell Nebula; Cork Nebula		Planetary Nebula	3.4	Perseus	12
–	NGC 654			Open Cluster	7.8	Cassiopeia	6.5
–	NGC 659			Open Cluster	8.2	Cassiopeia	7.9
C10	NGC 663			Open Cluster	7.2	Cassiopeia	7.1
–	NGC 720			Galaxy	80,000	Cetus	10.2
C28	NGC 752			Open Cluster	1	Andromeda	5.7
–	NGC 772			Galaxy	130,000	Aries	10.3
–	NGC 779			Galaxy	59,000	Cetus	11
C14	NGC 869	Η Persei of Double Cluster		Open Cluster	7.3	Perseus	4
C14	NGC 884	χ Persei of Double Cluster		Open Cluster	7.4	Perseus	4
C23	NGC 891			Galaxy	31,000	Andromeda	10
–	NGC 908			Galaxy	56,000	Cetus	10.2
–	NGC 936			Galaxy	60,000	Cetus	10.1
–	NGC 1022			Galaxy	65,000	Cetus	11.4
–	NGC 1023			Galaxy	30,000	Perseus	9.5
–	NGC 1027			Open Cluster	3.1	Cassiopeia	6.7
–	NGC 1052			Galaxy	63,000	Cetus	10.6
–	NGC 1055			Galaxy	52,000	Cetus	10.6
–	NGC 1084			Galaxy	65,000	Eridanus	10.6
–	NGC 1245			Open Cluster	9.8	Perseus	8.4
–	NGC 1342			Open Cluster	2.2	Perseus	6.7
–	NGC 1407			Galaxy	75,000	Eridanus	9.8
–	NGC 1444			Open Cluster	3.8	Perseus	6.6
–	NGC 1501	Oyster Nebula		Planetary Nebula	5.8	Camelopardalis	13
–	NGC 1502			Open Cluster	2.7	Camelopardalis	5.7
–	NGC 1513			Open Cluster	4.9	Perseus	8.4
–	NGC 1528			Open Cluster	2.5	Perseus	6.4
–	NGC 1535			Planetary Nebula	6.5	Eridanus	10
–	NGC 1545			Open Cluster	2.3	Perseus	6.2
–	NGC 1647			Open Cluster	1.8	Taurus	6.4
–	NGC 1664			Open Cluster	3.9	Auriga	7.6
–	NGC 1788			Nebula	1.3	Orion	9.0
–	NGC 1817			Open Cluster	6.4	Taurus	7.7
–	NGC 1857			Open Cluster	4.5	Auriga	7
–	NGC 1907			Open Cluster	4.5	Auriga	8.2
–	NGC 1931			Open Cluster and Nebula	7	Auriga	11.3
–	NGC 1961			Galaxy	175,000	Camelopardalis	11.1
–	NGC 1964			Galaxy	65,000	Lepus	10.8
–	NGC 1980			Open Cluster	1.4	Orion	6
–	NGC 1999			Nebula	1.5	Orion	–
–	NGC 2022			Planetary Nebula	6.1	Orion	12
–	NGC 2024	Flame Nebula		Nebula	0.9 – 1.5	Orion	10
–	NGC 2126			Open Cluster	4.4	Auriga	10
–	NGC 2129			Open Cluster	7.2	Gemini	6.7
–	NGC 2158			Open Cluster	11	Gemini	8.6
–	NGC 2169	37 Cluster		Open Cluster	3.6	Orion	5.9
–	NGC 2185			Nebula	2.9	Monoceros	–
–	NGC 2186			Open Cluster	7.3	Orion	8.7
–	NGC 2194			Open Cluster	10	Orion	8.5
–	NGC 2204			Open Cluster	8.6	Canis Major	8.6
–	NGC 2215			Open Cluster	3.1	Monoceros	8.4
–	NGC 2232			Open Cluster	1.3	Monoceros	3.9
C50	NGC 2244	Satellite Cluster		Open Cluster	4.9	Monoceros	4.8
–	NGC 2251			Open Cluster	5.5	Monoceros	7.3
–	NGC 2264	Christmas Tree Cluster; Cone Nebula		Open Cluster and Nebula	2.6	Monoceros	3.9
–	NGC 2266			Open Cluster	11	Gemini	10
–	NGC 2281			Open Cluster	1.8	Auriga	5.4
–	NGC 2286			Open Cluster	7.6	Monoceros	7.5
–	NGC 2301			Open Cluster	2.8	Monoceros	6
–	NGC 2304			Open Cluster	13.6	Gemini	10
–	NGC 2311			Open Cluster	7.4	Monoceros	10
–	NGC 2324			Open Cluster	17.2	Monoceros	8.4
–	NGC 2335			Open Cluster	5.6	Monoceros	7.2
–	NGC 2343			Open Cluster	3.7	Monoceros	6.7
–	NGC 2353			Open Cluster	4.1	Monoceros	7.1
–	NGC 2354			Open Cluster	4.3	Canis Major	6.5
–	NGC 2355			Open Cluster	5.4	Gemini	10
C58	NGC 2360	Caroline's Cluster		Open Cluster	4	Canis Major	7.2
C64	NGC 2362	Tau Canis Majoris Cluster		Open Cluster and Nebula	5.1	Canis Major	4.1
–	NGC 2371/2372			Planetary Nebula	4.4	Gemini	13
C39	NGC 2392	Eskimo Nebula; Clown Face Nebula		Planetary Nebula	4	Gemini	10
–	NGC 2395			Open cluster	1.3	Gemini	8
C7	NGC 2403			Galaxy	14,000	Camelopardalis	8.4
C25	NGC 2419			Globular Cluster	275	Lynx	10.4

=== 101–200 ===
Messier or Caldwell ID	NGC number	Common name	Image	Object type	Distance (kly)	Constellation	Apparent magnitude
–	NGC 2420			Open Cluster	–	Gemini	8.3
–	NGC 2421			Open Cluster	–	Puppis	8.3
M47	NGC 2422			Open Cluster	1.6	Puppis	4.4
–	NGC 2423			Open Cluster	–	Puppis	6.7
–	NGC 2438			Planetary Nebula	2.9	Puppis	10
–	NGC 2440			Planetary Nebula	4	Puppis	11
–	NGC 2479			Open Cluster	–	Puppis	10
–	NGC 2482			Open Cluster	–	Puppis	7.3
–	NGC 2489			Open Cluster	–	Puppis	7.9
C54	NGC 2506			Open Cluster	10	Monoceros	7.6
–	NGC 2509			Open Cluster	9.5	Puppis	9
–	NGC 2527			Open Cluster	–	Puppis	6.5
–	NGC 2539			Open Cluster	4.4	Puppis	6.5
M48	NGC 2548			Open Cluster	1.5	Hydra	5.8
–	NGC 2567			Open Cluster	–	Puppis	7.4
–	NGC 2571			Open Cluster	–	Puppis	7
–	NGC 2613			Galaxy	50,000	Pyxis	10.4
–	NGC 2627			Open Cluster	6.63	Pyxis	8
–	NGC 2655			Galaxy	63,000	Camelopardalis	10.1
–	NGC 2681			Galaxy	50,000	Ursa Major	10.3
–	NGC 2683			Galaxy	16,000	Lynx	9.7
–	NGC 2742			Galaxy	–	Ursa Major	11.7
–	NGC 2768			Galaxy	65,000	Ursa Major	10
C48	NGC 2775			Galaxy	55,000	Cancer	10.3
–	NGC 2782			Galaxy	70,000-110,000	Lynx	11.5
–	NGC 2787			Galaxy	25,000	Ursa Major	10.8
–	NGC 2811			Galaxy	–	Hydra	11.3
–	NGC 2841			Galaxy	31,000	Ursa Major	9.3
–	NGC 2859			Galaxy	23,000	Leo Minor	10.7
–	NGC 2903			Galaxy	20,500	Leo	8.9
–	NGC 2950			Galaxy	49,800	Ursa Major	11
–	NGC 2964			Galaxy	60,800	Leo	11.3
–	NGC 2974			Galaxy	89,000	Sextans	10.8
–	NGC 2976			Galaxy	12,000	Ursa Major	10.2
–	NGC 2985			Galaxy	70,100	Ursa Major	10.5
M82	NGC 3034	Cigar Galaxy		Galaxy	11,000	Ursa Major	8.4
–	NGC 3077			Galaxy	12,000	Ursa Major	9.9
–	NGC 3079			Galaxy	50,000	Ursa Major	10.6
C53	NGC 3115	Spindle Galaxy		Galaxy	22,000	Sextans	9.2
–	NGC 3147			Galaxy	130,000	Draco	10.7
–	NGC 3166			Galaxy	57,000-75,000	Sextans	10.6
–	NGC 3169			Galaxy	57,000-75,000	Sextans	10.5
–	NGC 3184			Galaxy	25,000	Ursa Major	9.8
–	NGC 3190			Galaxy	80,000	Leo	11
–	NGC 3193			Galaxy	80,000	Leo	10.9
–	NGC 3198			Galaxy	45,000	Ursa Major	10.4
–	NGC 3226			Galaxy	58,700	Leo	11.4
–	NGC 3227			Galaxy	58,700	Leo	10.8
C59	NGC 3242	Ghost of Jupiter		Planetary Nebula	1	Hydra	9
–	NGC 3245			Galaxy	–	Leo Minor	10.8
–	NGC 3277			Galaxy	–	Leo Minor	11.7
–	NGC 3294			Galaxy	–	Leo Minor	11.7
–	NGC 3310			Galaxy	50,000	Ursa Major	10.9
–	NGC 3344			Galaxy	22,500	Leo Minor	10
–	NGC 3377			Galaxy	35,000	Leo	10.2
M105	NGC 3379			Galaxy	38,000	Leo	9.3
–	NGC 3384			Galaxy	35,000	Leo	10
–	NGC 3395			Galaxy	–	Leo Minor	12.1
–	NGC 3412			Galaxy	–	Leo	10.6
–	NGC 3414			Galaxy	–	Leo Minor	10.8
–	NGC 3432			Galaxy	–	Leo Minor	11.3
–	NGC 3486			Galaxy	27,000	Leo Minor	10.3
–	NGC 3489			Galaxy	29,000	Leo	10.3
–	NGC 3504			Galaxy	–	Leo Minor	11.1
–	NGC 3521			Galaxy	30,000	Leo	8.9
M108	NGC 3556			Galaxy	45,000	Ursa Major	10.1
–	NGC 3593			Galaxy	20,000	Leo	11
–	NGC 3607			Galaxy	–	Leo	10
–	NGC 3608			Galaxy	–	Leo	11
–	NGC 3610			Galaxy	70,000	Ursa Major	10.8
–	NGC 3613			Galaxy	–	Ursa Major	12
–	NGC 3619			Galaxy	–	Ursa Major	13
–	NGC 3621			Galaxy	22,000	Hydra	10
C40	NGC 3626			Galaxy	86,000	Leo	10.9
–	NGC 3628			Galaxy	35,000	Leo	9.5
–	NGC 3631			Galaxy	35,000	Ursa Major	10.4
–	NGC 3640			Galaxy	75,400	Leo	10.3
–	NGC 3655			Galaxy	–	Leo	11.6
–	NGC 3665			Galaxy	85,600	Ursa Major	10.8
–	NGC 3675			Galaxy	50,000	Ursa Major	11
–	NGC 3686			Galaxy	53,000	Leo	11.4
–	NGC 3726			Galaxy	45,000	Ursa Major	10.4
–	NGC 3729			Galaxy	65,700	Ursa Major	11.4
–	NGC 3810			Galaxy	51,200	Leo	10.8
–	NGC 3813			Galaxy	–	Ursa Major	11.7
–	NGC 3877			Galaxy	50,000	Ursa Major	12
–	NGC 3893			Galaxy	51,400	Ursa Major	11
–	NGC 3898			Galaxy	–	Ursa Major	10.8
–	NGC 3900			Galaxy	–	Leo	11.4
–	NGC 3912			Galaxy	–	Leo	13
–	NGC 3938			Galaxy	43,000	Ursa Major	10.4
–	NGC 3941			Galaxy	40,000	Ursa Major	11
–	NGC 3945			Galaxy	–	Ursa Major	10.6
–	NGC 3949			Galaxy	50,000	Ursa Major	11
–	NGC 3953			Galaxy	56,000	Ursa Major	10.1
–	NGC 3962			Galaxy	–	Crater	10.6
–	NGC 3982			Galaxy	67,000	Ursa Major	12
M109	NGC 3992			Galaxy	55,000	Ursa Major	9.8
–	NGC 3998			Galaxy	–	Ursa Major	10.6
–	NGC 4026			Galaxy	52,000	Ursa Major	12

=== 201–300 ===
Messier or Caldwell ID	NGC number	Common name	Image	Object type	Distance (kly)	Constellation	Apparent magnitude
–	NGC 4027			Galaxy	68,000	Corvus	11.1
–	NGC 4030			Galaxy	75,000	Virgo	12
–	NGC 4036			Galaxy	62,000	Ursa Major	10.6
C60/C61	NGC 4038/4039	Antennae Galaxies		Galaxy	83,000	Corvus	10.7
–	NGC 4041			Galaxy	70,000	Ursa Major	11.1
–	NGC 4051			Galaxy	45,000	Ursa Major	10.3
–	NGC 4085			Galaxy	50,000	Ursa Major	12.3
–	NGC 4088			Galaxy	50,000	Ursa Major	10.5
–	NGC 4102			Galaxy	69,000	Ursa Major	12
–	NGC 4111			Galaxy	45,000	Canes Venatici	10.8
–	NGC 4143			Galaxy	–	Canes Venatici	12
–	NGC 4147			Globular Cluster	60	Coma Berenices	10.3
–	NGC 4150			Galaxy	–	Coma Berenices	11.7
–	NGC 4151			Galaxy	62,000	Canes Venatici	10.4
–	NGC 4179			Galaxy	–	Virgo	10.9
–	NGC 4203			Galaxy	50,000	Coma Berenices	10.7
–	NGC 4214			Galaxy	10,000	Canes Venatici	9.7
–	NGC 4216			Galaxy	40,000	Virgo	10
–	NGC 4245			Galaxy	–	Coma Berenices	11.4
–	NGC 4251			Galaxy	–	Coma Berenices	12
M106	NGC 4258			Galaxy	25,000	Canes Venatici	8.3
–	NGC 4261			Galaxy	95,000	Virgo	10.3
–	NGC 4273			Galaxy	–	Virgo	11.9
–	NGC 4274			Galaxy	45,000	Coma Berenices	10.4
–	NGC 4278			Galaxy	55,100	Coma Berenices	10.2
–	NGC 4281			Galaxy	–	Virgo	11.3
–	NGC 4293			Galaxy	54,000	Coma Berenices	11
M61	NGC 4303			Galaxy	60,000	Virgo	9.7
–	NGC 4314			Galaxy	40,000	Coma Berenices	10.5
–	NGC 4346			Galaxy	–	Canes Venatici	12
–	NGC 4350			Galaxy	–	Coma Berenices	11.1
–	NGC 4361			Planetary Nebula	–	Corvus	10
–	NGC 4365			Galaxy	–	Virgo	11
–	NGC 4371			Galaxy	–	Virgo	10.8
–	NGC 4394			Galaxy	40,000	Coma Berenices	10.9
–	NGC 4414			Galaxy	62,000	Coma Berenices	10.3
–	NGC 4419			Galaxy	–	Coma Berenices	11.1
–	NGC 4429			Galaxy	55,000	Virgo	10.2
–	NGC 4435	The Eyes		Galaxy	52,000	Virgo	10.9
–	NGC 4438	The Eyes		Galaxy	52,000	Virgo	10.1
–	NGC 4442			Galaxy	–	Virgo	10.5
–	NGC 4448			Galaxy	45,000	Coma Berenices	11.1
C21	NGC 4449			Galaxy	10,000	Canes Venatici	9.4
–	NGC 4450			Galaxy	50,000	Coma Berenices	10.1
–	NGC 4459			Galaxy	50,000	Coma Berenices	10.4
–	NGC 4473			Galaxy	50,000	Coma Berenices	10.2
–	NGC 4477			Galaxy	55,000	Coma Berenices	10.4
–	NGC 4478			Galaxy	50,000	Virgo	11.2
–	NGC 4485			Galaxy	25,000	Canes Venatici	12
–	NGC 4490			Galaxy	25,000	Canes Venatici	9.8
–	NGC 4494			Galaxy	45,000	Coma Berenices	9.9
–	NGC 4526			Galaxy	108,000	Virgo	9.6
–	NGC 4527			Galaxy	50,000	Virgo	10.4
–	NGC 4535			Galaxy	55,000	Virgo	9.8
–	NGC 4536			Galaxy	55,000	Virgo	10.4
–	NGC 4546			Galaxy	45,600	Virgo	10.3
M91	NGC 4548			Galaxy	60,000	Coma Berenices	10.2
–	NGC 4550			Galaxy	50,000	Virgo	11.6
C36	NGC 4559			Galaxy	32,000	Coma Berenices	9.9
C38	NGC 4565	Needle Galaxy		Galaxy	42,000	Coma Berenices	9.6
–	NGC 4570			Galaxy	55,000	Virgo	10.9
M104	NGC 4594	Sombrero Galaxy		Galaxy	50,000	Virgo	8.3
–	NGC 4596			Galaxy	55,000	Virgo	10.5
–	NGC 4618			Galaxy	30,000	Canes Venatici	10.8
C32	NGC 4631	Whale Galaxy		Galaxy	22,000	Canes Venatici	9.3
–	NGC 4636			Galaxy	53,000	Virgo	9.6
–	NGC 4643			Galaxy	–	Virgo	10.6
–	NGC 4654			Galaxy	55,000	Virgo	10.5
–	NGC 4656	Hockey Stick Galaxy		Galaxy	30,000	Canes Venatici	10.4
–	NGC 4660			Galaxy	63,000	Virgo	11
–	NGC 4665			Galaxy	58,000	Virgo	12
–	NGC 4666			Galaxy	80,000	Virgo	10.8
–	NGC 4689			Galaxy	55,000	Coma Berenices	10.9
C52	NGC 4697			Galaxy	76,000	Virgo	9.3
–	NGC 4698			Galaxy	55,000	Virgo	10.7
–	NGC 4699			Galaxy	65,000	Virgo	9.6
–	NGC 4725			Galaxy	41,000	Coma Berenices	9.2
–	NGC 4753			Galaxy	60,000	Virgo	9.9
–	NGC 4754			Galaxy	55,000	Virgo	10.6
–	NGC 4762			Galaxy	60,000	Virgo	10.2
–	NGC 4781			Galaxy	–	Virgo	12
–	NGC 4800			Galaxy	95,000	Canes Venatici	12
–	NGC 4845			Galaxy	47,000	Virgo	12
–	NGC 4856			Galaxy	–	Virgo	10.4
–	NGC 4866			Galaxy	80,000	Virgo	11
–	NGC 4900			Galaxy	–	Virgo	11.5
–	NGC 4958			Galaxy	–	Virgo	10.5
–	NGC 4995			Galaxy	–	Virgo	11
C29	NGC 5005			Galaxy	69,000	Canes Venatici	9.8
–	NGC 5033			Galaxy	38,000-60,000	Canes Venatici	10.1
–	NGC 5054			Galaxy	–	Virgo	11
–	NGC 5195	Messier 51b		Galaxy	25,000	Canes Venatici	9.6
C45	NGC 5248			Galaxy	74,000	Boötes	10.2
–	NGC 5273			Galaxy	–	Canes Venatici	11.6
–	NGC 5322			Galaxy	80,000	Ursa Major	10
–	NGC 5363			Galaxy	63,600	Virgo	10.2
–	NGC 5364			Galaxy	55,000	Virgo	10.4
–	NGC 5466			Globular Cluster	52	Boötes	9.1
–	NGC 5473			Galaxy	–	Ursa Major	11.4
–	NGC 5474			Galaxy	21,000	Ursa Major	10.9

=== 301–400 ===
Messier or Caldwell ID	NGC number	Common name	Image	Object type	Distance (kly)	Constellation	Apparent magnitude
–	NGC 5557			Galaxy	–	Boötes	11.1
–	NGC 5566			Galaxy	65,000	Virgo	10.5
–	NGC 5576			Galaxy	–	Virgo	10.9
–	NGC 5631			Galaxy	–	Ursa Major	13
–	NGC 5634			Globular Cluster	88	Virgo	9.6
–	NGC 5676			Galaxy	100,000	Boötes	10.9
–	NGC 5689			Galaxy	–	Boötes	11.9
C66	NGC 5694			Globular Cluster	113	Hydra	10.2
–	NGC 5746			Galaxy	95,000	Virgo	10.6
–	NGC 5846			Galaxy	93,000	Virgo	10.2
M102?	NGC 5866	Spindle Galaxy		Galaxy	50,000	Draco	10
–	NGC 5897			Globular Cluster	24	Libra	8.6
–	NGC 5907			Galaxy	55,000	Draco	10.4
–	NGC 5982			Galaxy	123,000	Draco	11.1
–	NGC 6118			Galaxy	83,000	Serpens	12
–	NGC 6144			Globular Cluster	–	Scorpius	9.1
M107	NGC 6171			Globular Cluster	20	Ophiuchus	8.1
–	NGC 6207			Galaxy	30,000	Hercules	11.6
–	NGC 6217			Galaxy	67,000	Ursa Minor	11.2
–	NGC 6229			Globular Cluster	100	Hercules	9.4
–	NGC 6235			Globular Cluster	–	Ophiuchus	10.2
–	NGC 6284			Globular Cluster	50	Ophiuchus	9
–	NGC 6287			Globular Cluster	30	Ophiuchus	9.2
–	NGC 6293			Globular Cluster	31-52	Ophiuchus	8.2
–	NGC 6304			Globular Cluster	19	Ophiuchus	8.4
–	NGC 6316			Globular Cluster	35	Ophiuchus	9
–	NGC 6342			Globular Cluster	28	Ophiuchus	9.9
–	NGC 6355			Globular Cluster	31	Ophiuchus	9.6
–	NGC 6356			Globular Cluster	50	Ophiuchus	8.4
–	NGC 6369	Little Ghost Nebula		Planetary Nebula	2	Ophiuchus	13
–	NGC 6401			Globular Cluster	24	Ophiuchus	9.5
–	NGC 6426			Globular Cluster	67	Ophiuchus	11.2
–	NGC 6440			Globular Cluster	28	Sagittarius	9.7
–	NGC 6445	Box Nebula		Planetary Nebula	–	Sagittarius	13
–	NGC 6451			Open Cluster	–	Scorpius	8
M20	NGC 6514	Trifid Nebula		Open Cluster and Nebula	2	Sagittarius	6.3
–	NGC 6517			Globular Cluster	–	Ophiuchus	10.3
–	NGC 6520			Open Cluster	–	Sagittarius	8
–	NGC 6522			Globular Cluster	25	Sagittarius	8.6
–	NGC 6528			Globular Cluster	26	Sagittarius	9.5
–	NGC 6540			Open Cluster	17	Sagittarius	9.3
C6	NGC 6543	Cat's Eye Nebula		Planetary Nebula	3	Draco	9
–	NGC 6544			Globular Cluster	10	Sagittarius	8.3
–	NGC 6553			Globular Cluster	20	Sagittarius	8.3
–	NGC 6568			Open Cluster	–	Sagittarius	9
–	NGC 6569			Globular Cluster	35	Sagittarius	8.7
–	NGC 6583			Open Cluster	–	Sagittarius	10
–	NGC 6624			Globular Cluster	26	Sagittarius	8.3
–	NGC 6629			Planetary Nebula	–	Sagittarius	12
–	NGC 6633			Open Cluster	1	Ophiuchus	4.6
–	NGC 6638			Globular Cluster	–	Sagittarius	9.2
–	NGC 6642			Globular Cluster	26	Sagittarius	8.8
–	NGC 6645			Open Cluster	–	Sagittarius	9
–	NGC 6664			Open Cluster	–	Scutum	7.8
–	NGC 6712			Globular Cluster	22.5	Scutum	8.2
–	NGC 6755			Open Cluster	4.6	Aquila	7.5
–	NGC 6756			Open Cluster	6.3	Aquila	11
–	NGC 6781			Planetary Nebula	–	Aquila	12
–	NGC 6802			Open Cluster	–	Vulpecula	8.8
–	NGC 6818	Little Gem Nebula		Planetary Nebula	–	Sagittarius	10
–	NGC 6823			Open Cluster	6	Vulpecula	7.1
C15	NGC 6826	Blinking Planetary		Planetary Nebula	2.2	Cygnus	10
–	NGC 6830			Open Cluster	–	Vulpecula	7.9
–	NGC 6834			Open Cluster	7	Cygnus	7.8
–	NGC 6866			Open Cluster	3.9	Cygnus	7.6
–	NGC 6882			Open Cluster	–	Vulpecula	8.1
C37	NGC 6885			Open Cluster	2	Vulpecula	6
–	NGC 6905	Blue Flash Nebula		Planetary Nebula	7.5	Delphinus	12
–	NGC 6910			Open Cluster	–	Cygnus	7.4
C47	NGC 6934			Globular Cluster	57	Delphinus	8.9
–	NGC 6939			Open Cluster	3.9	Cepheus	7.8
–	NGC 6940			Open Cluster	2.5	Vulpecula	6.3
C12	NGC 6946	Fireworks Galaxy		Galaxy	18,000	Cepheus	8.9
C20	NGC 7000	North America Nebula		Nebula	2	Cygnus	–
C42	NGC 7006			Globular Cluster	135	Delphinus	10.6
–	NGC 7008	Fetus Nebula		Planetary Nebula	3	Cygnus	13
C55	NGC 7009	Saturn Nebula		Planetary Nebula	1.4	Aquarius	8
–	NGC 7044			Open Cluster	–	Cygnus	11
–	NGC 7062			Open Cluster	–	Cygnus	8.3
–	NGC 7086			Open Cluster	–	Cygnus	8.4
–	NGC 7128			Open Cluster	–	Cygnus	9.7
–	NGC 7142			Open Cluster	6.2	Cepheus	9.3
–	NGC 7160			Open Cluster	–	Cepheus	6.1
–	NGC 7209			Open Cluster	3.8	Lacerta	6.7
–	NGC 7217			Galaxy	50,000	Pegasus	10.2
C16	NGC 7243			Open Cluster	3	Lacerta	6.4
–	NGC 7296			Open Cluster	–	Lacerta	10
C30	NGC 7331			Galaxy	47,000	Pegasus	9.5
–	NGC 7380	Wizard Nebula		Open Cluster and Nebula	7.2	Cepheus	7.2
–	NGC 7448			Galaxy	79,500	Pegasus	11.7
C44	NGC 7479			Galaxy	106,000	Pegasus	11
–	NGC 7510			Open Cluster	11	Cepheus	7.9
–	NGC 7606			Galaxy	98,500	Aquarius	10.8
C22	NGC 7662	Blue Snowball		Planetary Nebula	3.2	Andromeda	9
–	NGC 7686			Open Cluster	–	Andromeda	5.6
–	NGC 7723			Galaxy	91,500	Aquarius	11.1
–	NGC 7727			Galaxy	76,000	Aquarius	10.7
–	NGC 7789	Caroline's Rose		Open Cluster	7.6	Cassiopeia	6.7
–	NGC 7790			Open Cluster	11	Cassiopeia	8.5
C43	NGC 7814			Galaxy	49,000	Pegasus	10.5

== See also ==
- Category:IC objects
- Category:NGC objects
- Caldwell catalogue
- Index Catalogue (IC)
- Messier Catalogue
- New General Catalogue (NGC)
- Revised Index Catalogue (RIC)
- Revised New General Catalogue (RNGC)
- Bennett Catalogue
- List of astronomical catalogues by Stephen James O'Meara
