= NGC 3412 =

Galaxy in the constellation of Leo

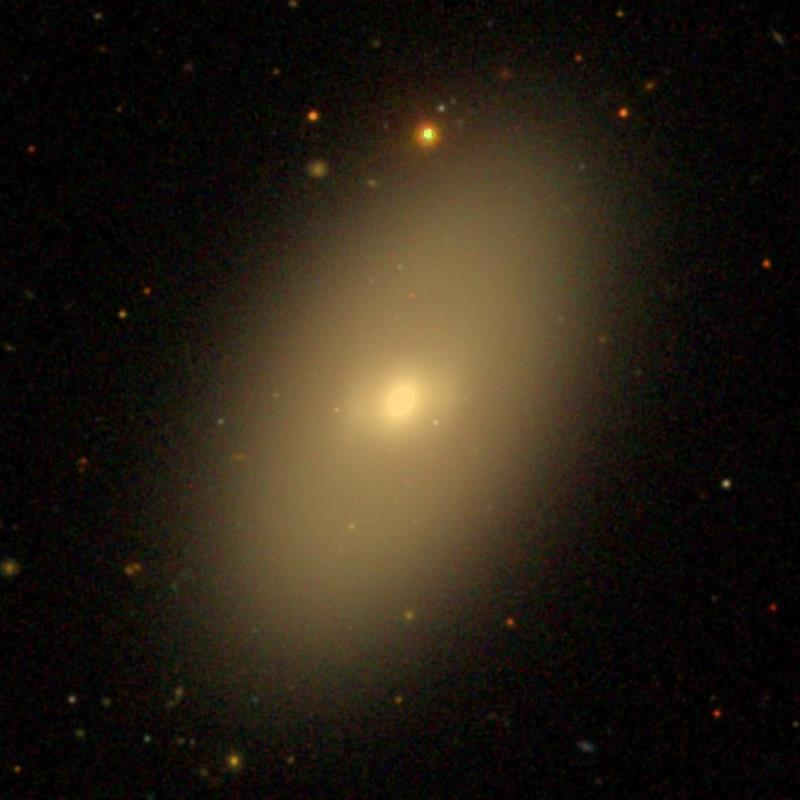
- SDSS image of NGC 3412

Observation data (J2000 epoch)
- Constellation: Leo
- Right ascension: 10^{h} 50^{m} 53.3^{s}
- Declination: +13° 24′ 43.7″
- Redshift: 0.002885
- Heliocentric radial velocity: 864 ± 4 km/s
- Distance: 42 Mly (13 Mpc)
- Apparent magnitude (V): 10.54
- Apparent magnitude (B): 11.45

Characteristics
- Type: SB(s)0^{0}
- Apparent size (V): 3.6′ × 2.0′

Other designations
- UGC 5952, MCG +02-28-016, PGC 32508

NGC 3412 is a barred lenticular galaxy located in the constellation Leo. It was discovered on April 8, 1784, by the German-British astronomer William Herschel. The galaxy is inclined at an angle of 55.3°±2.1° with the major axis aligned along a position angle of 151.0°±0.9°.
