= NGC 4800 =

Galaxy in constellation Canes Venatici

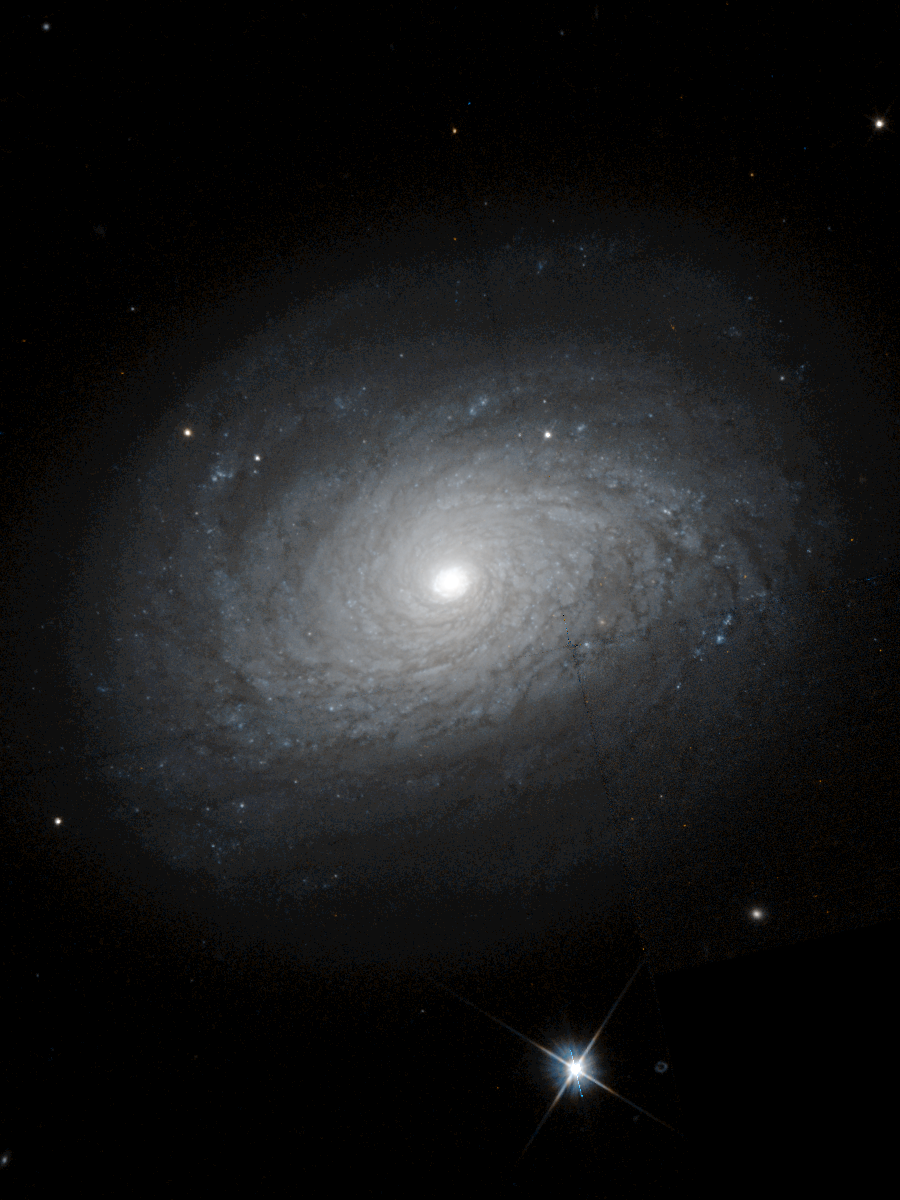
- Hubble Space Telescope image of NGC 4800

Observation data (J2000 epoch)
- Constellation: Canes Venatici
- Right ascension: 12^{h} 54^{m} 37.78208^{s}
- Declination: +46° 31′ 52.2815″
- Redshift: 0.002972
- Heliocentric radial velocity: 891±17 km/s
- Distance: 95 Mly (29.0 Mpc)
- Apparent magnitude (B): 12.0

Characteristics
- Type: SA(rs)b

Other designations
- NGC 4800, LEDA 43931, 2MASX J12543777+4631521

NGC 4800 is an isolated spiral galaxy in the constellation Canes Venatici, located at a distance of 95 megalight-years from the Milky Way. It was discovered by William Herschel on April 1, 1788. The morphological classification of this galaxy is SA(rs)b, indicating a spiral galaxy with no visual bar at the nucleus (SA), an incomplete ring structure (rs), and moderately-tightly wound spiral arms (b). The galactic plane is inclined to the line of sight by an angle of 43°, and the long axis is oriented along a position angle of 25°. There is a weak bar structure at the nucleus that is visible in the infrared.

The galaxy has a low-luminosity active galactic nucleus with an HII region at the core. The circumnuclear zone contains a double ring structure of "ultra-compact nuclear rings"; the inner ring has a radius of 30 pc and the outer ring's radius is about 130 pc. The upper limit on the mass of the central supermassive black hole is estimated as 2.0×10^{7} M_{☉}, or 20 million times the mass of the Sun.

NGC 4800 is isolated within the Ursa Major Cloud, which is part of the Virgo Supercluster.
