= NGC 6905 =

Planetary nebula in the constellation Delphinus

Emission nebula
- Planetary nebula
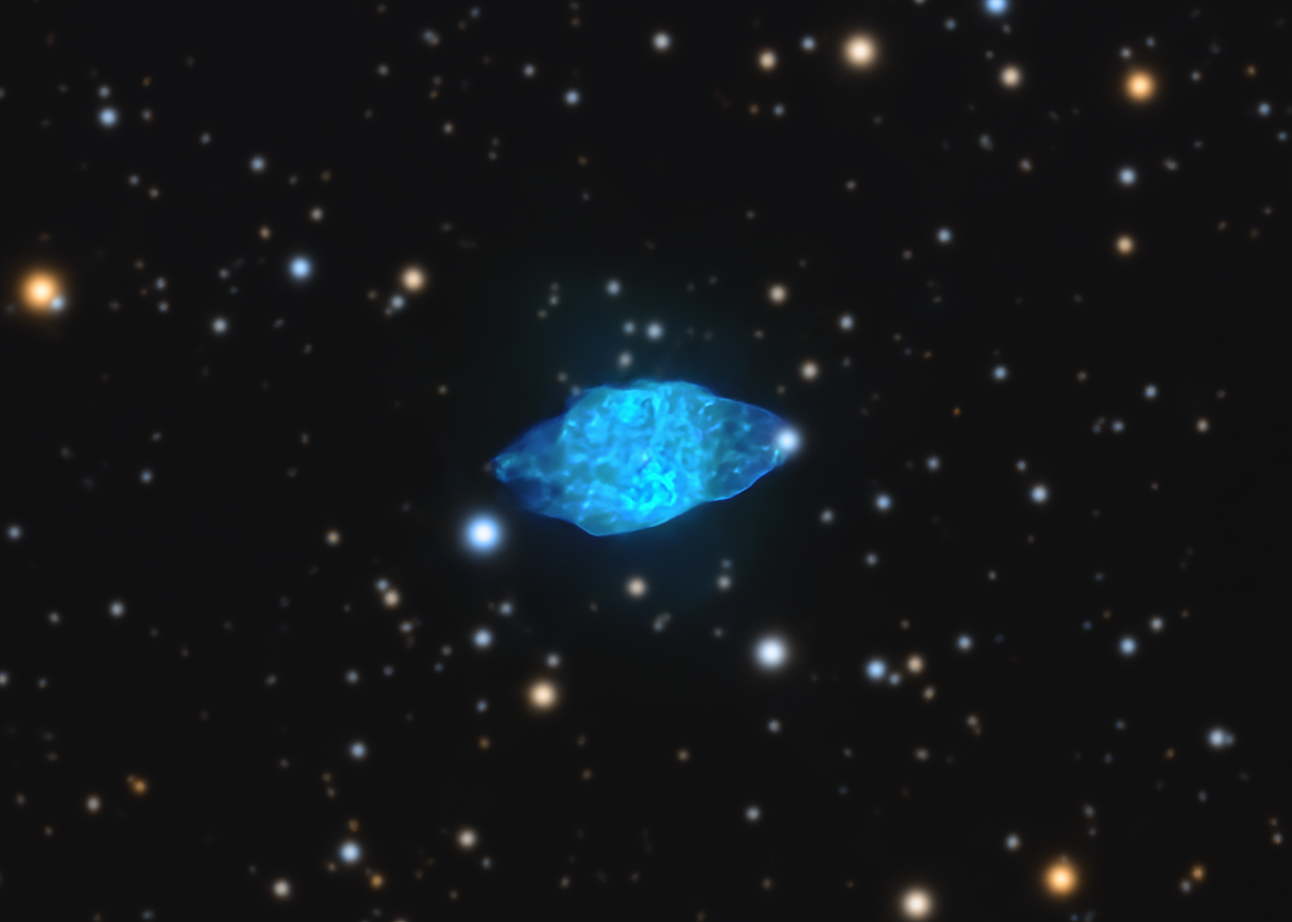
- ArSHO Taken By Hunter Outten With Orion 10" Astropgraph

Observation data: J2000 epoch
- Right ascension: 20^{h} 22^{m} 23^{s}
- Declination: +20° 06′ 16″
- Distance: 7.5 Kly (2.3 Kpc) ly
- Apparent magnitude (V): 10.9
- Apparent dimensions (V): 1.2′
- Constellation: Delphinus
- Designations: Blue Flash Nebula

NGC 6905, also known as the Blue Flash Nebula or Caged Spirit Nebula, is a planetary nebula in the constellation Delphinus. It was discovered by William Herschel in 1784. The central star is 14.0 mag. The distance of the nebula, as with most planetary nebulae, is not well determined and estimates range between 1.7 and 2.6 kpc.

The shape of NGC 6905 is characterised by an internal shell with angular dimensions 47" ×34" and roughly conical extensions, with ansae-type formations along the major axis. The nucleus of the nebula possesses one of the most broad emission of OVI emission lines among planetary nebulae. Moreover, OVIII emission has been detected in NGC 6905. The ansae were particularly intense in NII. The total mass of gas in NGC 6905 falls between 0.31 M_{☉} and 0.47 M_{☉}.

The central star has a spectral type of [WO2], meaning it has a spectrum similar to those of Wolf–Rayet stars and is rich in oxygen; it is estimated to have a surface temperature of 150,000 K. The spectrum also shows signs of neon emission lines. Currently about 60% the mass of the Sun, before becoming a planetary nebula it had a mass of about 1.07 M_{☉}. An analysis of Gaia data suggests that the central star may be a binary system.

NGC 6905 can be detected under dark skies with a 4-inch telescope, but it is better observed with larger instruments.
