= NGC 2950 =

Galaxy in the constellation Ursa Major

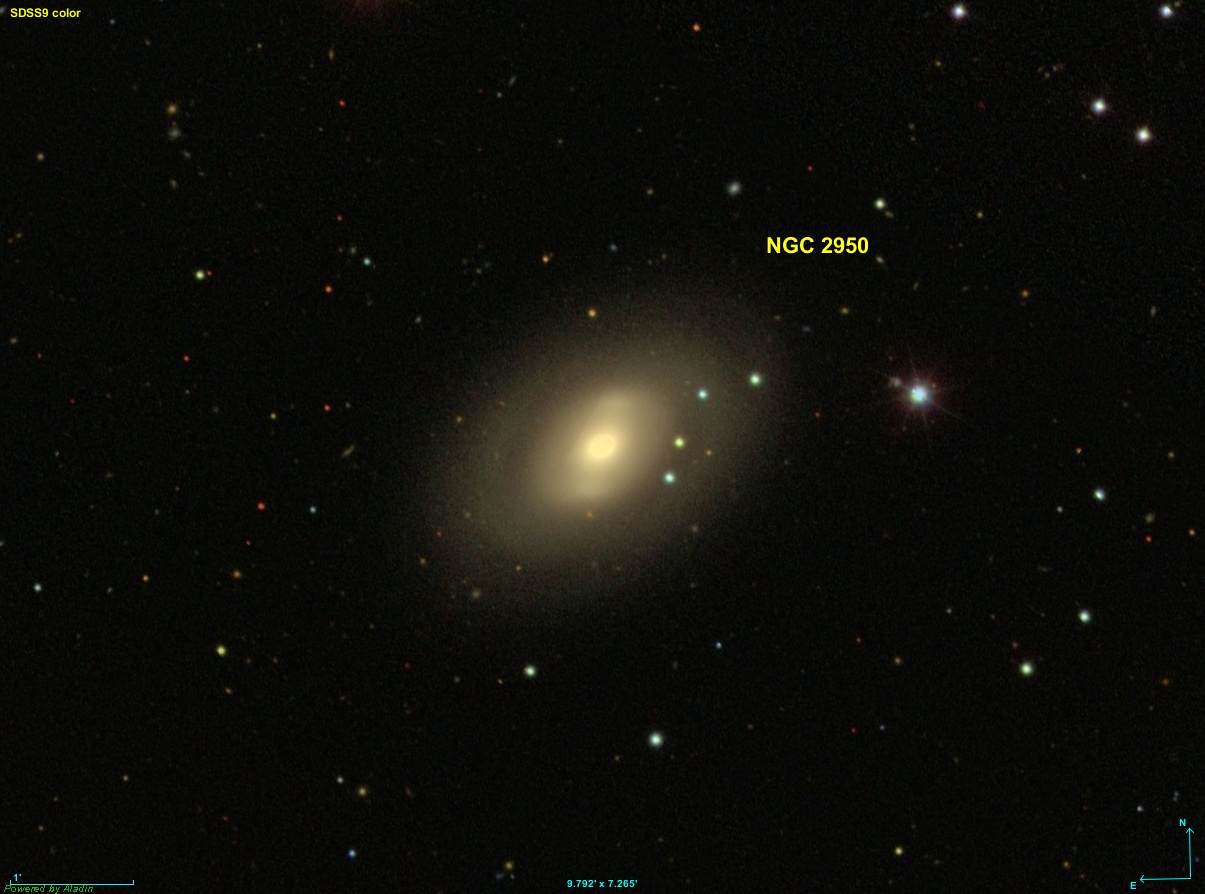
- SDSS image of NGC 2950 (center)

Observation data (J2000 epoch)
- Constellation: Ursa Major
- Right ascension: 09^{h} 42^{m} 35.116^{s}
- Declination: 58° 51′ 04.39″
- Redshift: 0.004410 ± 0.000017
- Heliocentric radial velocity: 1,329 km/s
- Distance: 49.84 ± 0.46 Mly (15.28 ± 0.14 Mpc)
- Apparent magnitude (B): 11.93

Characteristics
- Type: RSB0(r)
- Apparent size (V): 2′.7 × 1′.8

Other designations
- NGC 2950, UGC 5176, PGC 27765

NGC 2950 is a lenticular galaxy in the northern constellation of Ursa Major, about 50 million light years from the Milky Way and receding with a heliocentric radial velocity of 1,329 km/s. It was discovered in 1790 by the Anglo-German astronomer William Herschel. NGC 2950 is a field galaxy, it is not part of a galaxy cluster or galaxy group, and thus is gravitationally isolated. Nine certain and four possible dwarf galaxies have been identified around NGC 2950.

The morphological classification of this galaxy is RSB0(r), indicating a barred lenticular galaxy (SB0) with outer (R) and inner (r) ring structures. It hosts two nested stellar bars; the rotation frequency of the secondary bar is higher than that of the primary one. Double bars of this type are relatively common, having been found in ~30% of barred lenticulars. The inner bar appears to be counter-rotating relative to the outer bar, with the two passing cleanly through each other. The stellar mass of the galaxy is 1.7×10^{10} M_{☉} while the halo mass is 6.6×10^{11} M_{☉}.
