= NGC 2985 =

Galaxy in the constellation Ursa Major

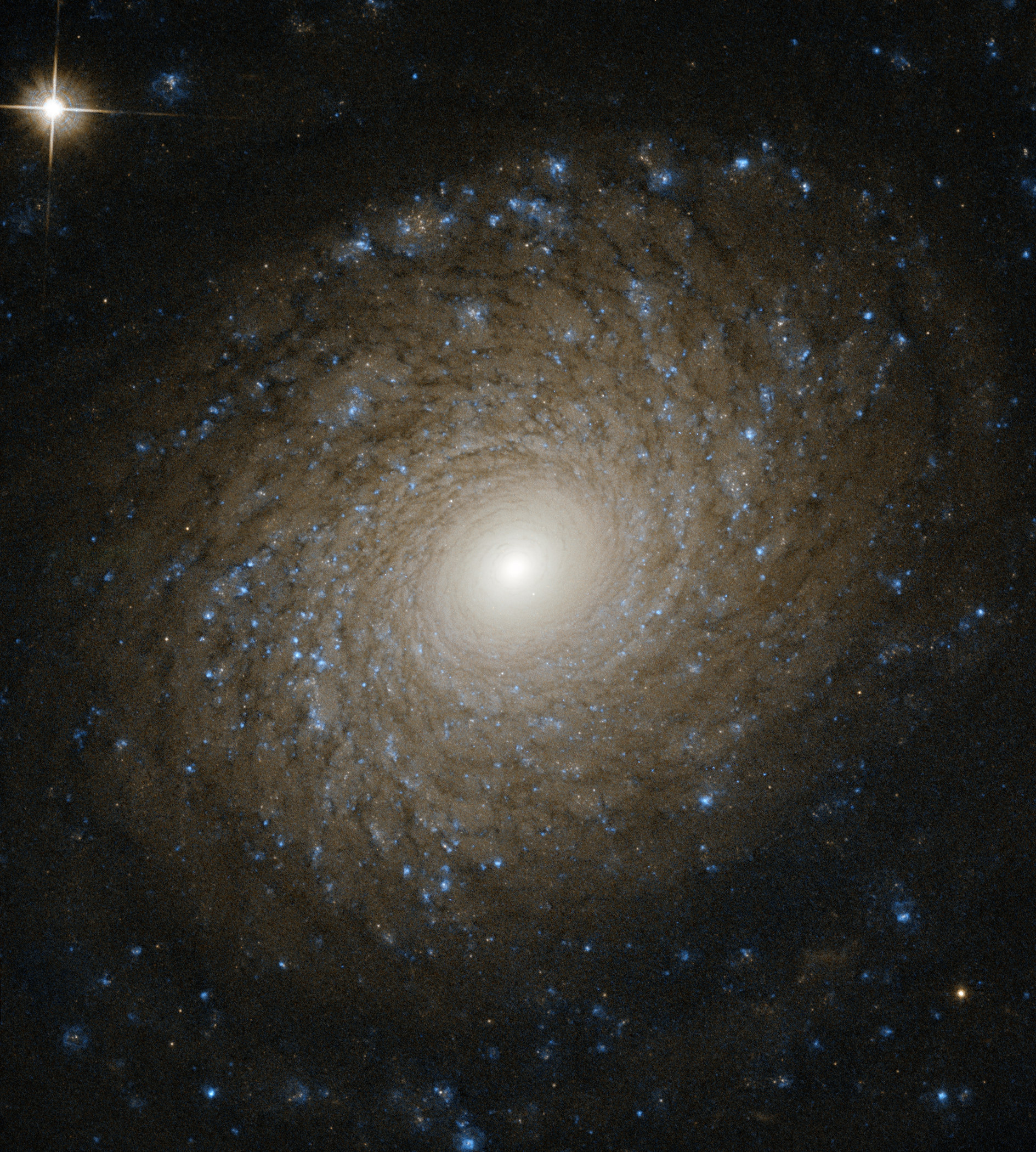
- NGC 2985 by Hubble Space Telescope.

Observation data (J2000 epoch)
- Constellation: Ursa Major
- Right ascension: 09^{h} 50^{m} 22.2^{s}
- Declination: +72° 16′ 43″
- Redshift: 0.004410±0.0000237
- Heliocentric radial velocity: 1,322±7 km/s
- Distance: 70.1 ± 4.1 Mly (21.5 ± 1.3 Mpc)
- Apparent magnitude (V): 10.4

Characteristics
- Type: (R')SA(rs)ab
- Apparent size (V): 4.6′ × 3.6′

Other designations
- NGC 2985, UGC 5253, MCG +12-10-006, PGC 28316, CGCG 332-067

NGC 2985 is a spiral galaxy located in the constellation Ursa Major. It is located at a distance of circa 70 million light years from Earth, which, given its apparent dimensions, means that NGC 2985 is about 95,000 light years across. It was discovered by William Herschel on April 3, 1785.

The galaxy is seen with an inclination of 37 degrees. The galaxy has a bright nucleus from which emanate multiple tightly wound spiral fragments. Numerous blue knots are visible at the galactic disk. At the outer part of the galaxy lies a massive spiral arm that forms a pseudoring that encircles the galaxy. The inner part of the galaxy, where active star formation has been observed, has been found to be unstable, contrary to the outer stable one. It has been suggested that the presence of molecular clouds accounts for the instability of the region.

The nucleus of NGC 2985 is active, and based on its spectrum has been categorised as a LINER. The most accepted theory for the activity source is the presence of an accretion disk around a supermassive black hole. The mass of the supermassive black hole at the centre of NGC 2985 is estimated to be 160 million (10^{8.2}) M_{☉}, based on stellar velocity dispersion. The velocity dispersion is anisotropic, and changes with the azimuth. The rotational speed of the galaxy at its effective radius is 222.9 ± 31.2 km/s.

NGC 2985 is the brightest member of a galaxy group known as the NGC 2985 group. Other members of the group include NGC 3027, 25 arcminutes away. Other nearby galaxies include NGC 3252, and NGC 3403.
