= NGC 2527 =

Open cluster in the constellation Puppis

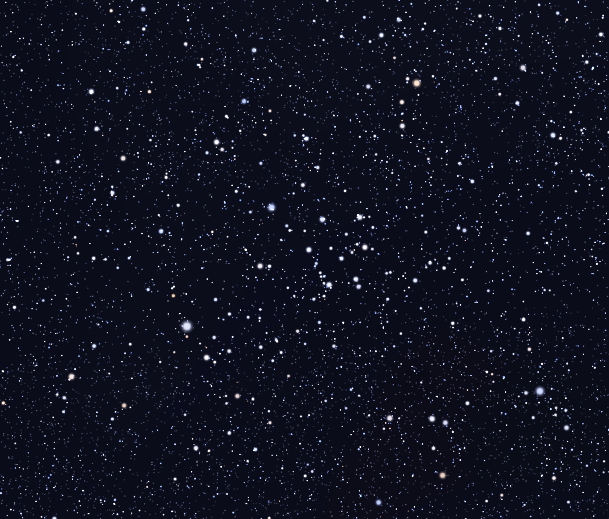

Observation data (J2000 epoch)
- Right ascension: 08^{h} 04^{m} 58^{s}
- Declination: −28° 08′ 48″
- Distance: 1,960 ly (601 pc)
- Apparent magnitude (V): 6.5
- Apparent dimensions (V): 10′

Physical characteristics
- Mass: 740 M_{☉}
- Estimated age: 445 million years 810 million years
- Other designations: NGC 2520, Cr 174

Associations
- Constellation: Puppis

NGC 2527 (also catalogued as NGC 2520) is an open cluster of stars in the constellation of Puppis. It was discovered by German-British astronomer William Herschel on December 9, 1784. The cluster was also observed by his son John Herschel on January 7, 1831. He also observed it on February 5, 1837, identifying it as a different object, which was catalogued as NGC 2520. It is a poor cluster and with no central concentration, with Trumpler class III1p.

The core radius of the cluster is 1 parsec (3.3 light years), while the tidal radius is 5.1 parsecs (17 light years) and represents the average outer limit of NGC 2527, beyond which a star is unlikely to remain gravitationally bound to the cluster core. 37 stars, probable members of the cluster, are located within the central part of the cluster and 96 probable members are located within the angular radius of the cluster. The brightest star members are A-type stars, with the brightest being an A3 star with magnitude 9.38. In the cluster has been detected one white dwarf, with mass 0.77±0.03 M_{☉}. Its age is estimated to be 441±188 years and the progenitor star has initial mass circa 3.1 M_{☉}. The turn-off mass of the cluster is at 2.8 M_{☉}. The metallicity of the cluster is -0.01, similar to the solar one.

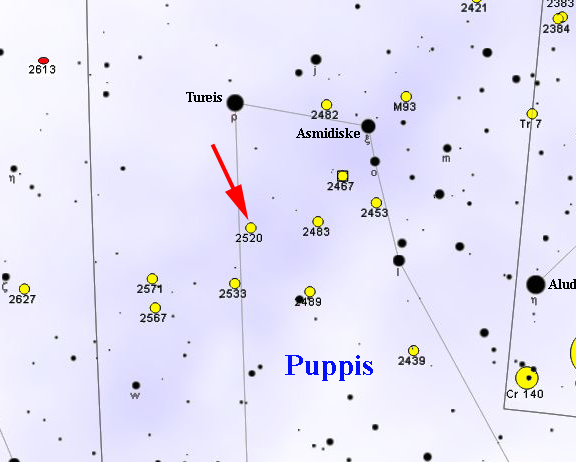
The location of NGC 2527 in the sky

NGC 2527 lies 3.8 degrees south of Rho Puppis and can be seen with 50mm binoculars as a moderately large, bright patch of haze, with no stars visible with direct vision.
