= NGC 2681 =

Galaxy in the constellation Ursa Major

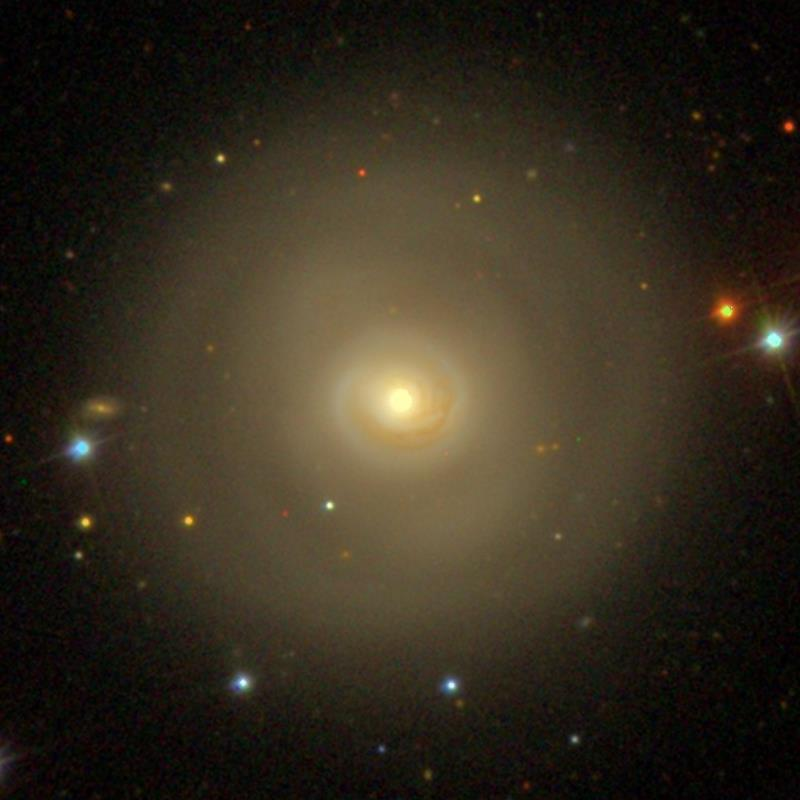
- NGC 2681 by SDSS

Observation data (J2000 epoch)
- Constellation: Ursa Major
- Right ascension: 08^{h} 53^{m} 32.7^{s}
- Declination: 51° 18′ 49″
- Redshift: 692±11 km/s
- Distance: 51 Mly (15.6 Mpc)
- Apparent magnitude (V): 10.2

Characteristics
- Type: (R')SAB(rs)0/a
- Apparent size (V): 3.6′ × 3.3′

Other designations
- UGC 4645, MCG +09-15-041, PGC 24961

NGC 2681 is a lenticular galaxy in the northern constellation of Ursa Major. The galaxy lies 50 million light years away from Earth, which means, given its apparent dimensions, that NGC 2681 is approximately 55,000 light years across. NGC 2681 has an active galactic nucleus and it is a type 3 Seyfert galaxy. Its nucleus is also a low-ionization nuclear emission-line region.

NGC 2681 has possibly three bars, with a relatively large bar at the outer side. Because the galaxy is seen nearly face-on, the bar like structures cannot be projection effects. From Earth based observations, in B-I images the galaxy showed neither grand design spirals nor a ring, but only two symmetrical spiral arms starting from the end of the primary bar. In Hα images some HII regions were observed in the spiral arms. A dust spiral is seen in Hubble space telescope images extending to the centre. The lack of stellar gradient in the central regions and the data from Faint Object Camera, Faint Object Spectrograph and International Ultraviolet Explorer indicate that the galaxy had a starburst event approximately one billion years ago, possibly after the tidal interaction with another galaxy, which involved all the galaxy.

Dynamical modeling of the velocity dispersions suggests that NGC 2681 hosts a supermassive black hole whose upper mass limit was set at 6×10^{7} M⊙. As observed from Chandra X-ray Observatory, NGC 2681 displayed three stellar sources within the central kiloparsec of the galaxy. The active galactic nucleus had luminosity 1.8 × 10^{38} erg/s, which accounts for approximately the 20% of the total luminosity of the central kiloparsec.
