= NGC 3900 =

Galaxy in the constellation of Leo

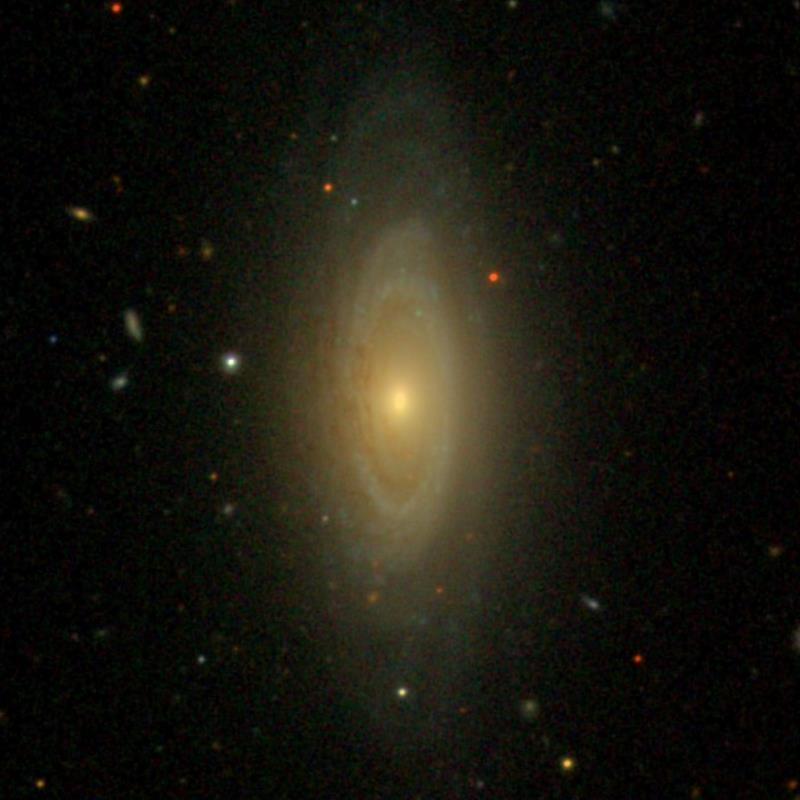
- SDSS image of NGC 3900

Observation data (J2000 epoch)
- Constellation: Leo
- Right ascension: 11^{h} 49^{m} 09.45631^{s}
- Declination: +27° 01′ 19.2764″
- Redshift: 0.006012
- Heliocentric radial velocity: 1,797 km/s
- Distance: 84 Mly (25.9 Mpc)
- Apparent magnitude (V): 11.44
- Apparent magnitude (B): 12.29

Characteristics
- Type: SA(r)0^{+}
- Apparent size (V): 3.2′ × 1.7′

Other designations
- NGC 3900, UGC 6786, MCG +05-28-034, PGC 36914

NGC 3900 is a lenticular galaxy located in the constellation Leo. It was discovered by William Herschel in 1785. It is estimated to be about 95 to 100 million light-years away from Earth.
