= NGC 7209 =

Open cluster in the constellation Lacerta

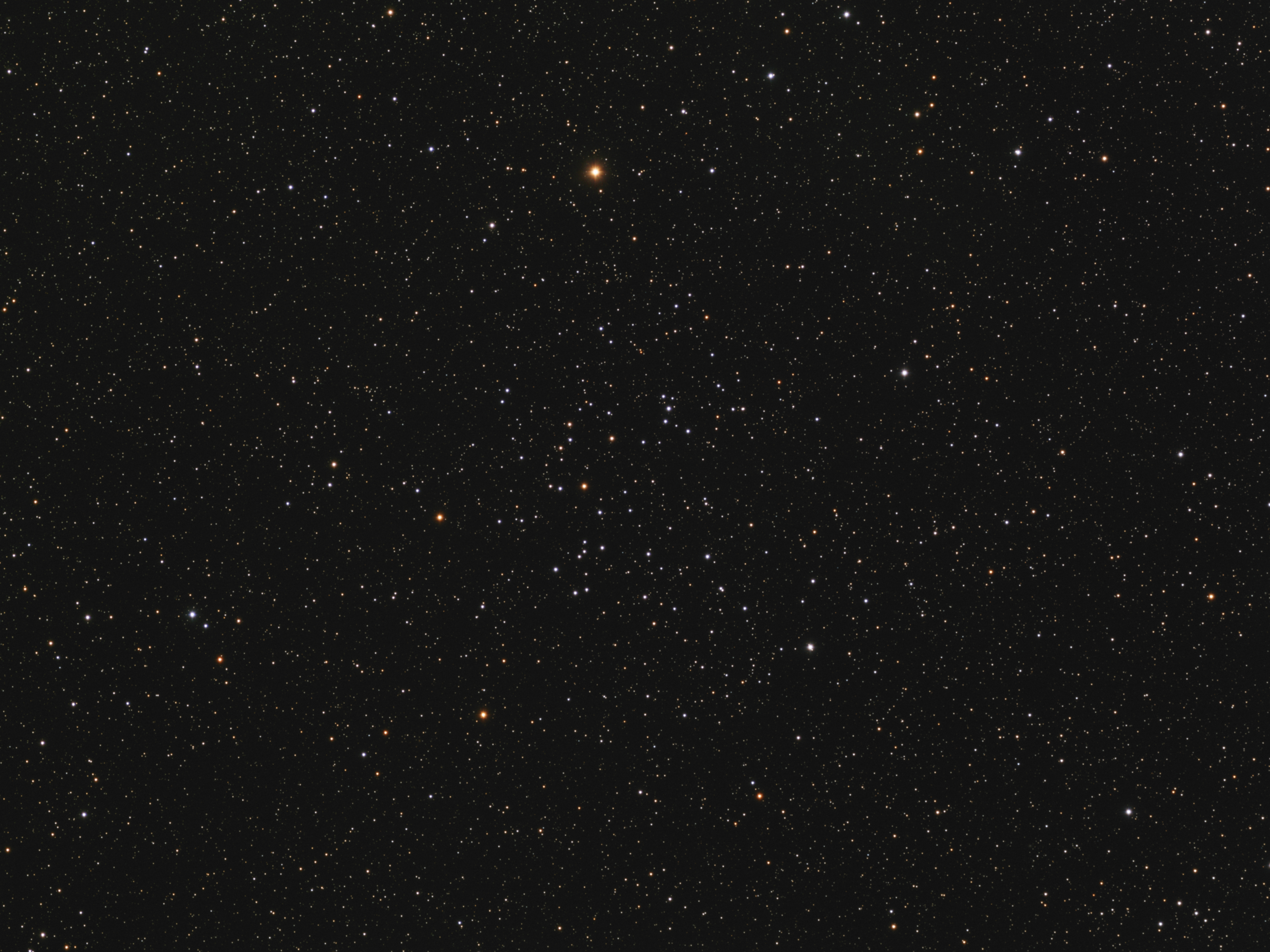

Observation data (J2000 epoch)
- Right ascension: 22^{h} 05^{m} 07^{s}
- Declination: +46° 29′ 00″
- Distance: 3,810 ly (1,168 pc)
- Apparent magnitude (V): 7.7
- Apparent dimensions (V): 25'

Physical characteristics
- Mass: 278 M_{☉}
- Estimated age: 420 million years
- Other designations: Cr 444

Associations
- Constellation: Lacerta

NGC 7209 is an open cluster in the constellation Lacerta. It was discovered by William Herschel on 19 October 1787. The cluster lies 3,810 light years away from Earth. It has been suggested that there is another cluster at a distance of 2,100 light years projected in front of a cluster lying at 3,800 light years away, based on the reddening of the cluster, however, further photometric studies of the cluster did not support that claim.

The cluster is made up out of 150 stars with magnitude from 9 to 15 within a tidal radius of 9 parsec (30 light years). From its members, 3 are probably delta Scuti variables. One other member of the cluster is the variable SS Lancertae, a binary star with 14.4 day period whose magnitude stopped varying in the middle of the 20th century. This has been attributed to the presence of a third star with period 679 days, whose perturbations change the line of sight. The nodal cycle is found to be about 600 years, within which occur two ecliptic phases, each lasting about 100 yr.
