= NGC 4419 =

Galaxy in the constellation Coma Berenices

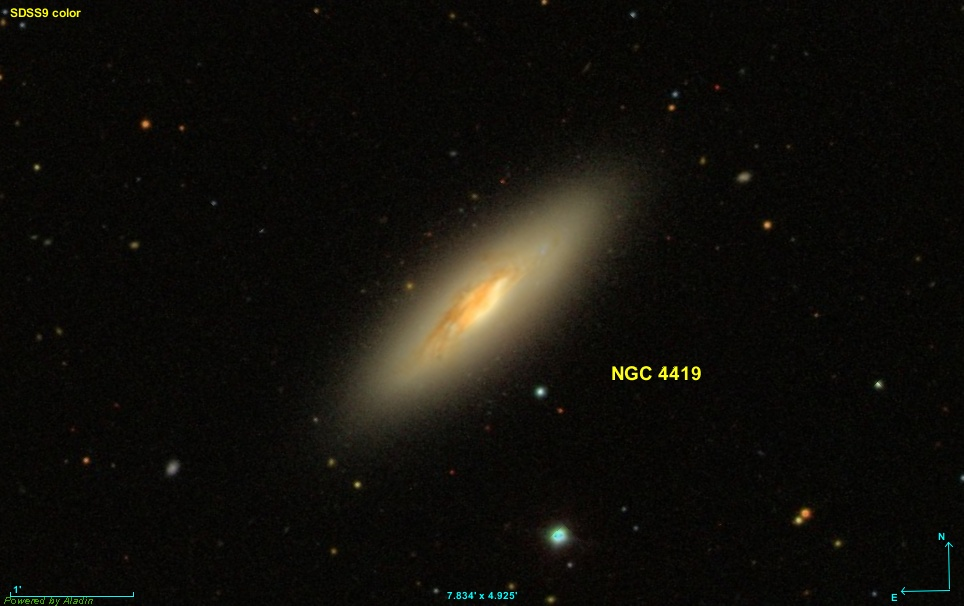
- NGC 4419 imaged by SDSS

Observation data (J2000 epoch)
- Constellation: Coma Berenices
- Right ascension: 12^{h} 26^{m} 56.4494^{s}
- Declination: +15° 02′ 50.861″
- Redshift: −0.000871±0.0000170
- Heliocentric radial velocity: −261±5 km/s
- Distance: 52.49 ± 2.51 Mly (16.095 ± 0.771 Mpc)
- Group or cluster: Virgo Cluster
- Apparent magnitude (V): 11.2

Characteristics
- Type: SB(s)a edge-on
- Size: ~60,300 ly (18.49 kpc) (estimated)
- Apparent size (V): 3.3′ × 1.2′

Other designations
- VCC 958, IRAS 12244+1519, UGC 7551, MCG +03-32-038, PGC 40772, CGCG 099-054

NGC 4419 is a barred spiral galaxy in the constellation of Coma Berenices. It was discovered by German-British astronomer William Herschel on 8 April 1784. NGC 4419 has an apparent visual magnitude of 11.2 and spans an angular size of 3.3′ × 1.2′. It is a member of the Virgo Cluster of galaxies, and is moving through the cluster center at an extreme velocity. The nearest neighbor galaxy is NGC 4421 at a separation of 25′.

NGC 4419 is a LINER galaxy, i.e. a galaxy whose nucleus has an emission spectrum characterized by broad lines of weakly ionized atoms. It is inclined at an angle of 71° to the line of sight from the Earth. Mapping of the carbon monoxide distribution in the galaxy shows a significant spacial asymmetry.

== Distance ==
NGC 4419 has a velocity with respect to the cosmic microwave background of 64±23 km/s, which is too small to be used to estimate its distance. Instead, 22 non-redshift measurements are used to give a mean distance of 52.49 ± 2.51 Mly (16.095 ± 0.771 Mpc).

== Supernovae ==
Two supernovae have been observed in NGC 4419:

- SN 1984A (Type Ia, mag. 16) was discovered by Givi N. Kimeridze on 4 January 1984, and independently by Leonida Rosino on 7 January 1984.
- SN 2012cc (Type II, mag. 18.2) was discovered by the Lick Observatory Supernova Search (LOSS) on 29 April 2012.

== See also ==
- List of NGC objects (4001–5000)
