= NGC 5273 =

Galaxy in the constellation Canes Venatici

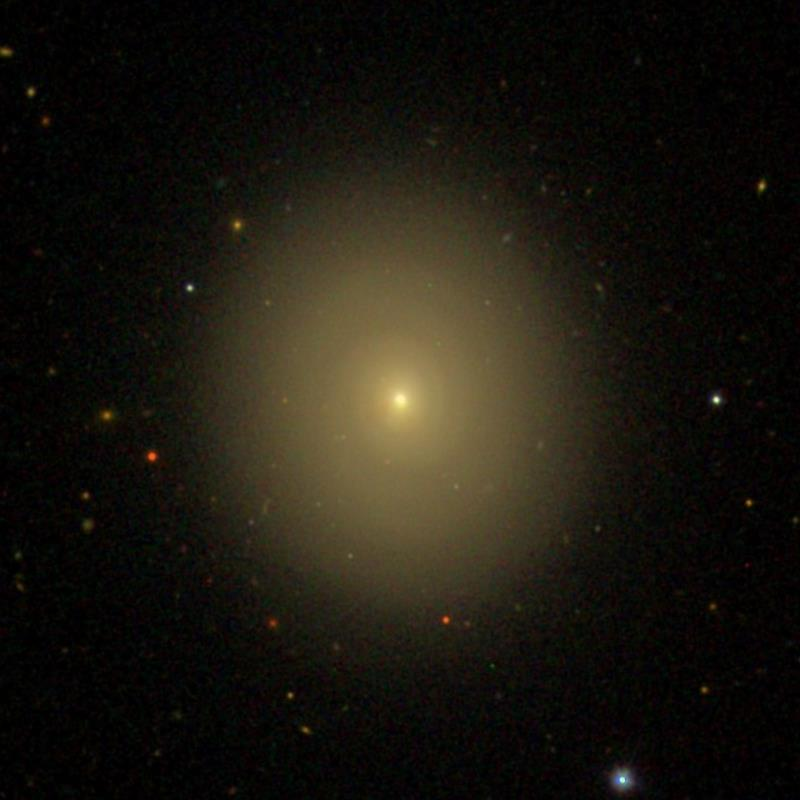
- Sloan Digital Sky Survey image of NGC 5273

Observation data (J2000 epoch)
- Right ascension: 13^{h} 42^{m} 08.380^{s}
- Declination: +35° 39′ 15.47″
- Redshift: 0.00362
- Distance: 54.1 ± 6.8 Mly (16.6 ± 2.1 Mpc)
- Apparent magnitude (V): 11.6; 13.12
- Apparent magnitude (B): 14.01

Characteristics
- Type: SA0(s)
- Apparent size (V): 2.8′ × 2.4′

Other designations
- NGC 5273, UGC 8675, PGC 48521

NGC 5273 is a lenticular galaxy located 54 million light-years away in the northern constellation of Canes Venatici. This galaxy was discovered by William Herschel on May 1, 1785. It is positioned 1 1/4° to the southeast of the star 25 Canum Venaticorum.

The morphological classification of this galaxy is SA0(s), indicating it is lenticular in form. It displays a faint, unbarred spiral structure within a generally elliptical profile. NGC 5273 is classified as a type 1.5 Seyfert galaxy, with the X-ray emission from its active galactic nucleus undergoing significant absorption. However, data collected between the year 2000 and 2022 suggest this is a changing–look Seyfert, with the type ranging from 1 to 1.8/1.9. The activity level shows strong variability, allowing reverberation mapping of the supermassive black hole at the core. This object has an estimated mass of (4.7±1.6)×10^{6} M_{☉}.
