= NGC 2440 =

Planetary nebula in the constellation Puppis

Emission nebula
- Planetary nebula
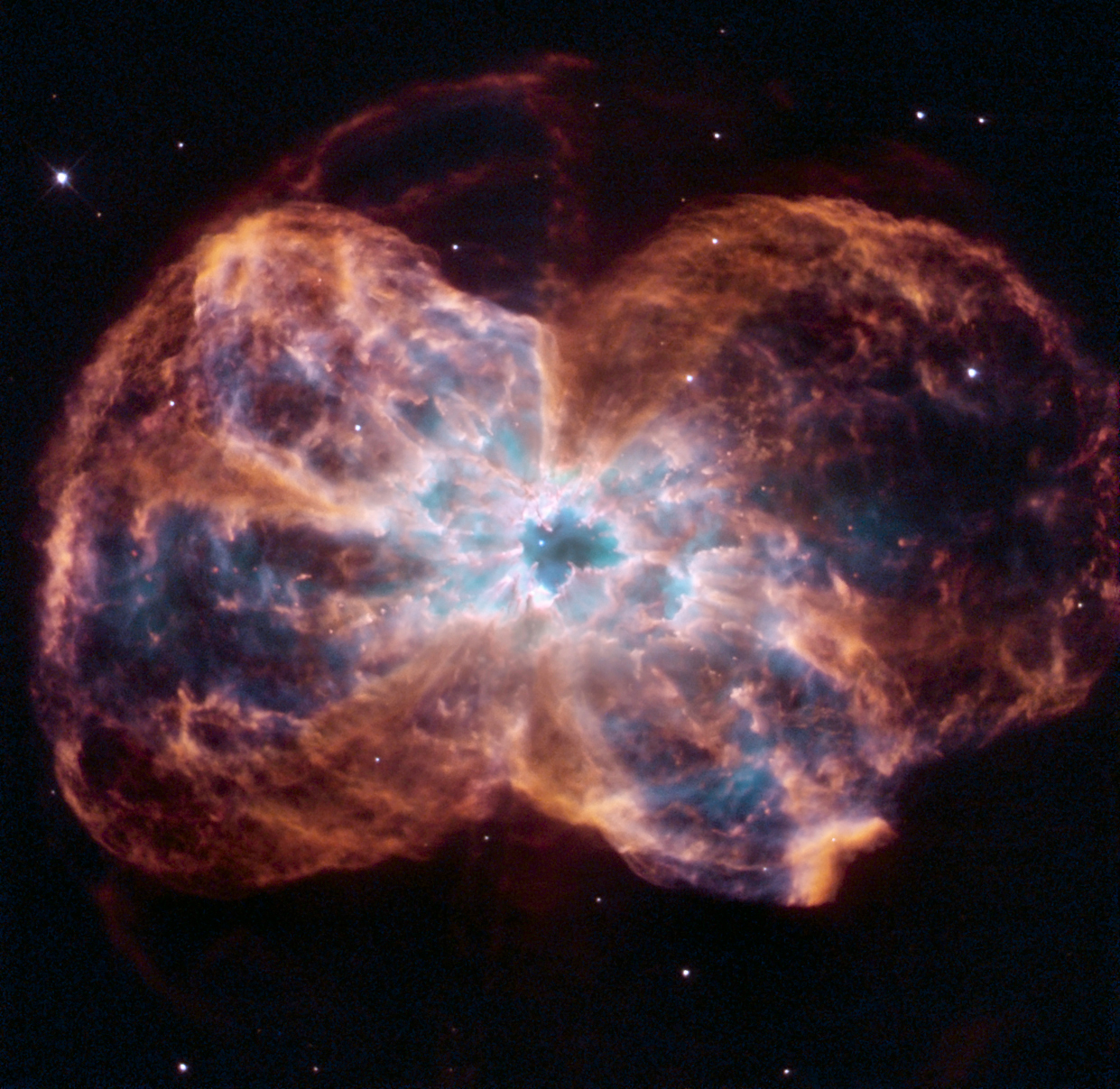
- NGC 2440, as taken by the Hubble Space Telescope

Observation data: J2000 epoch
- Right ascension: 07^{h} 41^{m} 54.91^{s}
- Declination: −18° 12′ 29.7″
- Distance: 4.00 kly (1.23 kpc) ly
- Apparent magnitude (V): 9.4
- Apparent dimensions (V): 74" × 42"
- Constellation: Puppis

Physical characteristics
- Radius: 0.72 ly
- Designations: ESO 560-PN9, Bow Nebula

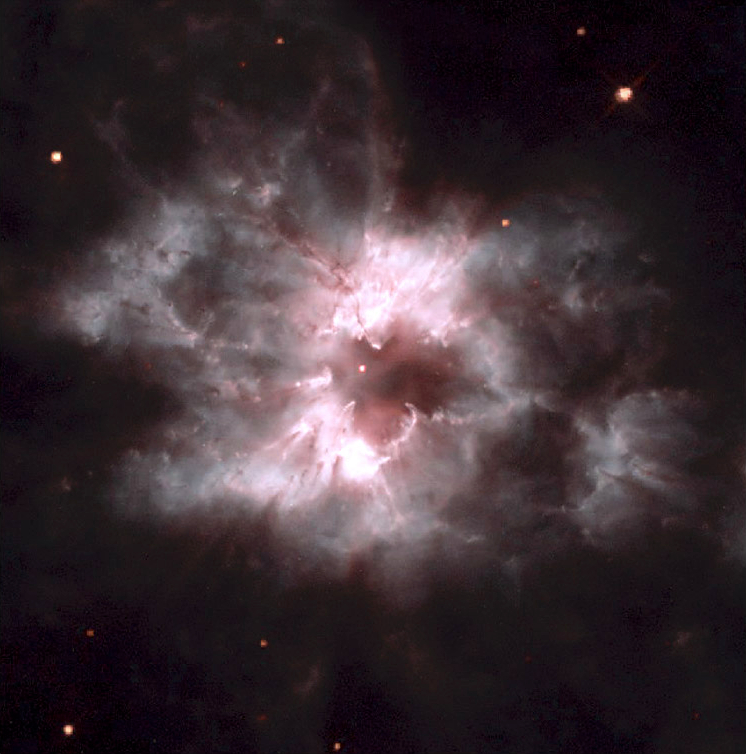
Centre of NGC 2440

NGC 2440, also known as the Albino Butterfly Nebula, Kiss Nebula, or Little Lips Nebula, is a planetary nebula, one of many in our galaxy. Its central star, HD 62166, is possibly the hottest known white dwarf, about 400,000°F(200,000°C). The nebula is situated in the constellation Puppis.

It was discovered by William Herschel on March 4, 1790. He described it as "a beautiful planetary nebula of a considerable degree of brightness, not very well defined." The nebula is located about 1.23 kiloparsecs (3.79×10^{19} m) or about 4,000 light years from the Sun.

== HD 62166 ==
The central star HD 62166 has an exceptionally high surface temperature of about 200,000 kelvins and a luminosity 1,100 times that of the Sun. This dense star, with an estimated 0.6 solar mass and 0.028 solar radius, has an apparent magnitude of 17.5.
