= NGC 1245 =

Open cluster in the constellation Perseus

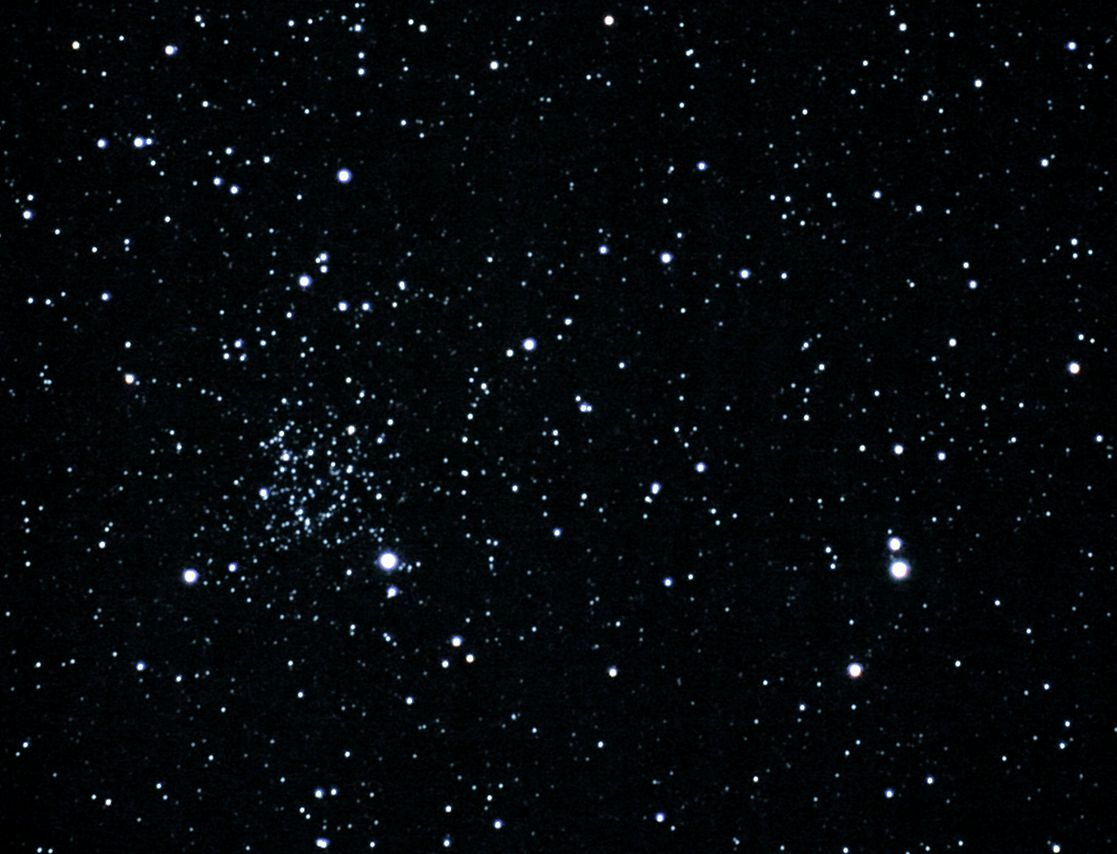

Observation data (J2000 epoch)
- Right ascension: 03^{h} 14^{m} 48^{s}
- Declination: +47° 15′ 11″
- Distance: 9,800 ly (3.0 kpc)
- Apparent magnitude (V): 8.4
- Apparent dimensions (V): 10′

Physical characteristics
- Estimated age: 1.06 Gyr
- Other designations: Cr 38

Associations
- Constellation: Perseus

NGC 1245, also known as the Patrick Starfish Cluster, is an open cluster of stars in the northern constellation of Perseus. It was discovered by William Herschel on 11 December 1786. It is located 3° southwest of alpha Persei and can be spotted with 10x50 binoculars. The cluster is nearly 1 billion years old. NGC 1245 has about 200 members the brightest of which are of 12th magnitude. The cluster shows evidence of mass segregation and it is possible that it has lost its lower mass members. Lying at a distance of 3kpc, the cluster is estimated to be 27 light years across.
