= NGC 4273 =

Galaxy in the constellation Virgo

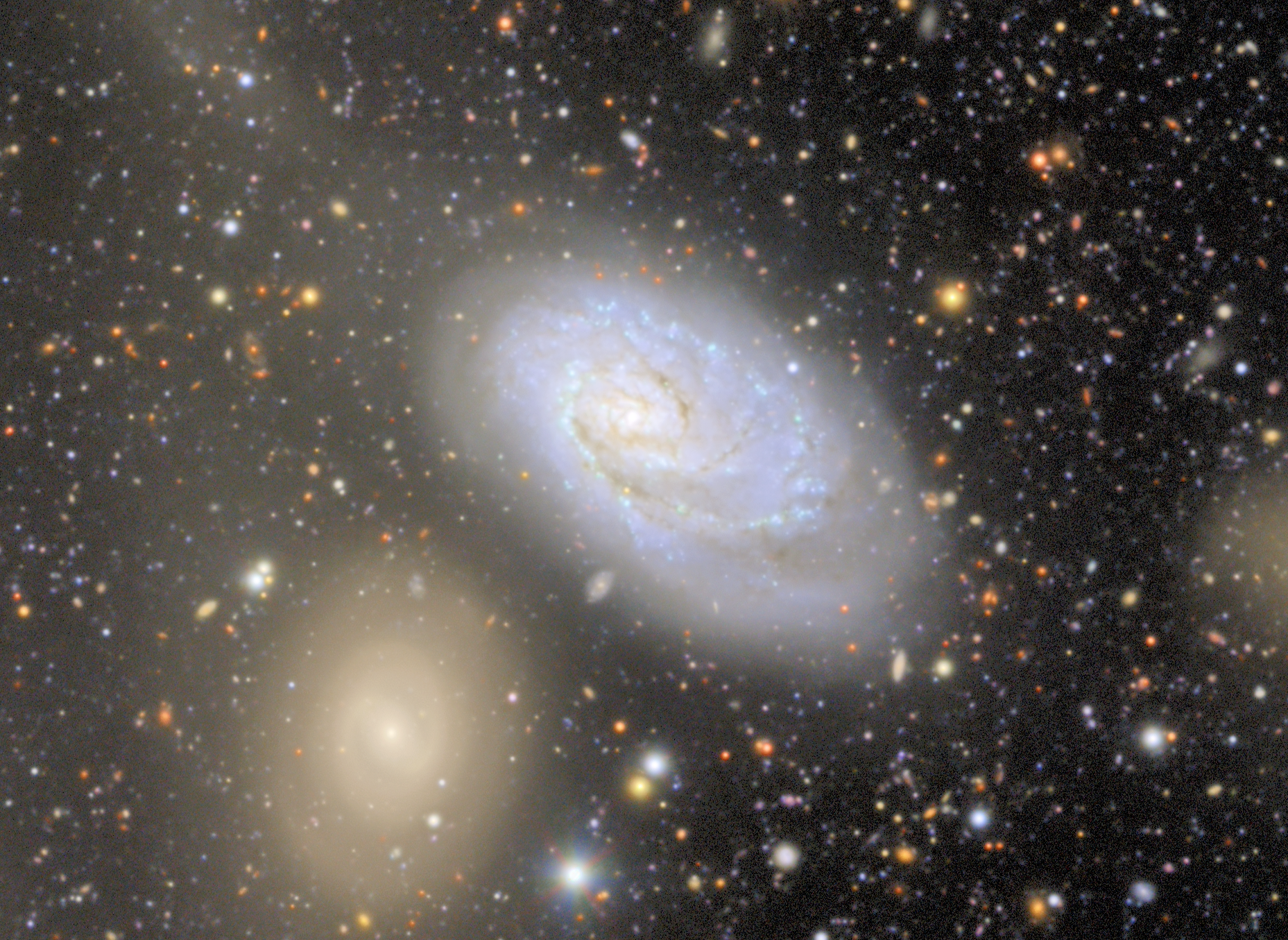
- NGC 4273 imaged by the Vera C. Rubin Observatory

Observation data (J2000 epoch)
- Constellation: Virgo
- Right ascension: 12^{h} 19^{m} 56.0407^{s}
- Declination: +05° 20′ 36.497″
- Redshift: 0.007942
- Heliocentric radial velocity: 2,381±2 km/s
- Distance: 94.72 ± 4.68 Mly (29.040 ± 1.435 Mpc)
- Group or cluster: NGC 4235 group (LGG 281)
- Apparent magnitude (V): 11.7

Characteristics
- Type: SB(s)c
- Size: ~68,900 ly (21.12 kpc) (estimated)
- Apparent size (V): 2.3′ × 1.5′

Other designations
- IRAS 12173+0537, 2MASX J12195606+0520361, NGC 4273, UGC 7380, MCG +01-32-008, PGC 39738, CGCG 042-028

NGC 4273 is a barred spiral galaxy in the constellation of Virgo. Its velocity with respect to the cosmic microwave background is 2,727±24 km/s, which corresponds to a Hubble distance of 131.2 ± 9.3 Mly (40.23 ± 2.84 Mpc). However, 20 non-redshift measurements give a much closer distance of 94.72 ± 4.68 Mly (29.040 ± 1.435 Mpc). It was discovered by German-British astronomer William Herschel on 17 April 1786.

According to A.M. Garcia, NGC 4273 is a member of the NGC 4235 group (also known as LGG 281). This galaxy group contains at least 29 members, of which 18 appear in the New General Catalogue and 4 in the Index Catalogue.

== Supernovae ==
Two supernovae have been observed in NGC 4273:

- SN 1936A (Type II, mag. 14.5) was discovered by Edwin Hubble and Glenn Moore on 21 January 1936. (Note: Some sources incorrectly list the discovery date of SN 1936A as 2 January 1936.)
- SN 2008N (Type II, mag. 17.8) was discovered by Alex Filippenko, D. Winslow, and W. Li on 17 January 2008.

== See also ==
- List of NGC objects (4001–5000)
