= NGC 6834 =

Open cluster in the constellation Cygnus

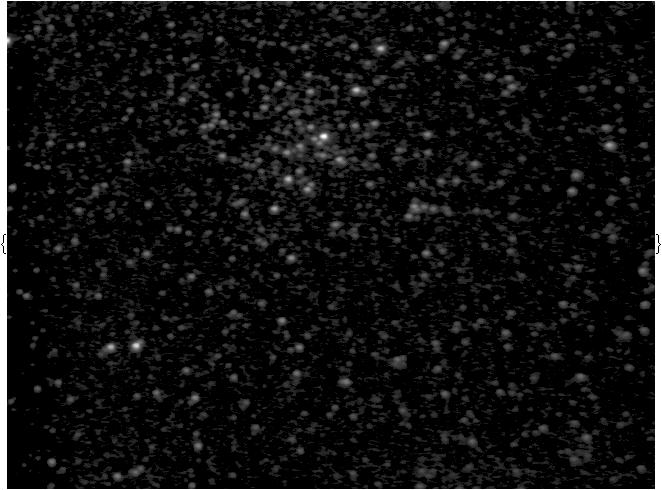

Observation data (J2000.0 epoch)
- Right ascension: 19^{h} 52^{m} 12.5^{s}
- Declination: +29° 24′ 29″
- Distance: 10,850 ly (3,326.7 pc)
- Apparent magnitude (V): 7.8
- Apparent dimensions (V): 12′

Physical characteristics
- Radius: 6.1 ly
- Estimated age: 65±18 Myr
- Other designations: NGC 6834, C 1950+292

Associations
- Constellation: Cygnus

NGC 6834 is a young open cluster of stars located about 10,850 light years from the Sun in the constellation Cygnus. It was discovered on July 17, 1784, by Anglo-German astronomer William Herschel. The cluster has a visual magnitude of 7.8, which is dimmed by 2.1 magnitudes due to interstellar dust. Half the cluster members lie within an angular radius of 6′.

The Trumpler class of this cluster is II 2 m, indicating it is medium-rich in stars (m) with a moderate brightness range (2) and little central concentration of the stars (II). It has about 260 members and an age of approximately 65 million years, although estimates range from 50 to 80 million. A total of fifteen B-type variable stars have been detected in the cluster with four Be stars. Five of the cluster members show hydrogen alpha emission, including a γ Cas and two λ Eri variables.
