= NGC 4346 =

Galaxy in the constellation Canes Venatici

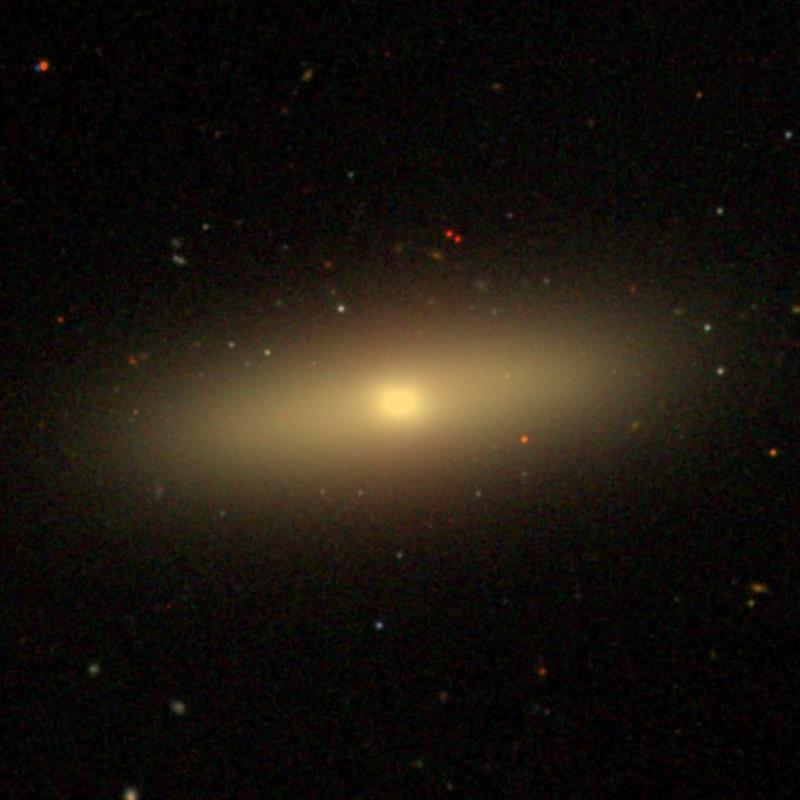
- NGC 4346 (SDSS DR14)

Observation data (J2000 epoch)
- Constellation: Canes Venatici
- Right ascension: 12^{h} 23^{m} 27.970^{s}
- Declination: +46° 59′ 37.558″
- Redshift: 0.002568±0.00009
- Heliocentric radial velocity: 798 km/s
- Distance: 45.9 Mly (14.06 Mpc)
- Group or cluster: Ursa Major Cluster
- Apparent magnitude (V): 11.3

Characteristics
- Type: S0 edge-on
- Apparent size (V): 3.2′ × 1.3′

Other designations
- NGC 4346, UGC 07463, MCG +08-23-016, CGCG 244-009, 1221.0+4716

NGC 4346 is a lenticular galaxy located in the constellation Canes Venatici about 50 million light-years away. It was discovered on April 1, 1788 by the German-British astronomer William Herschel. This formation has an apparent visual magnitude of 11.3 and spans an angular size of 3.2′ × 1.3′. It is a member of the Ursa Major Cluster of galaxies, and is the dominant member of its own sub-group located near the center of the cluster.
