= NGC 2768 =

Lenticular galaxy in the constellation Ursa Major

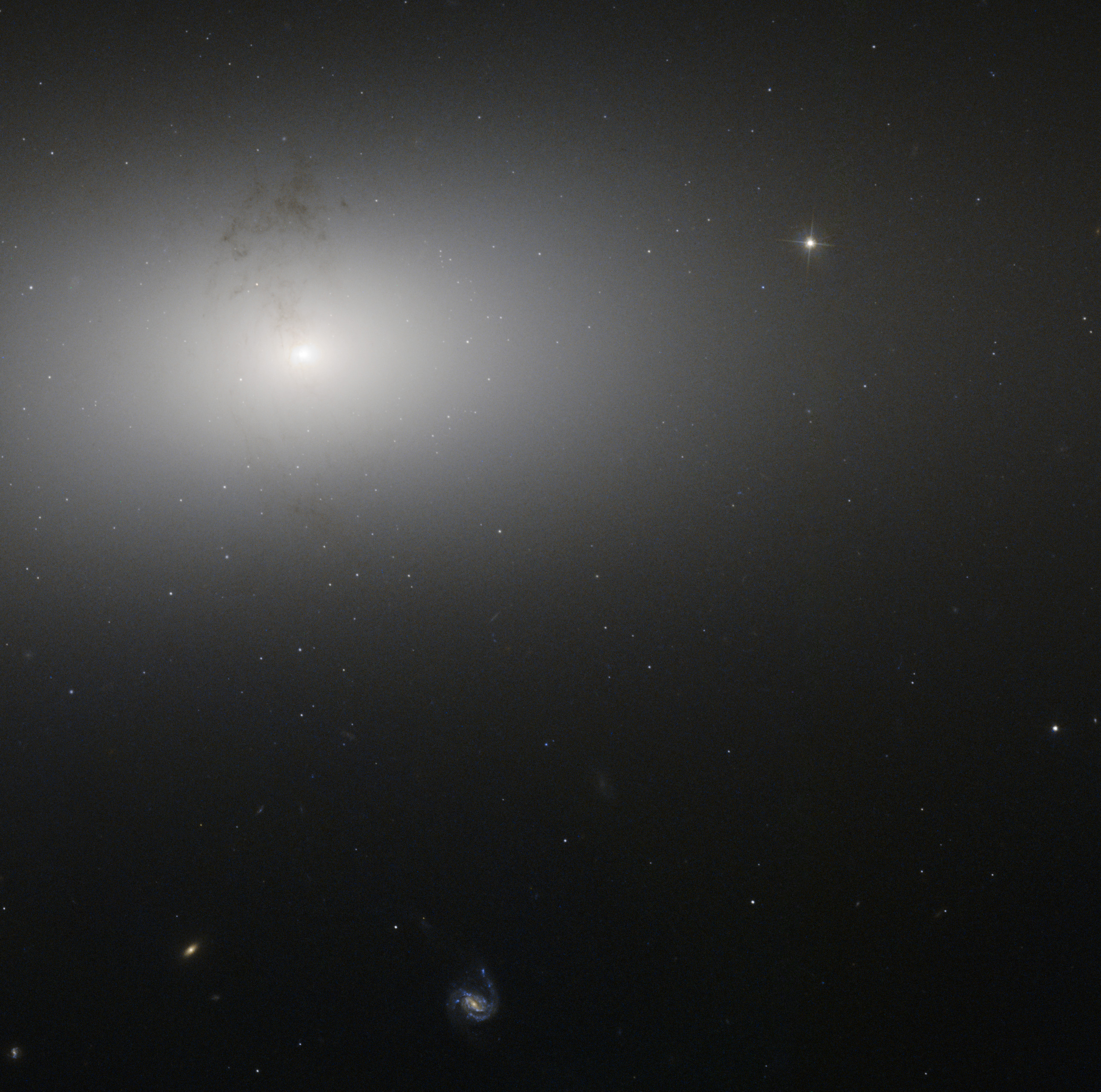
- NGC 2768 by Hubble Space Telescope.

Observation data (J2000 epoch)
- Constellation: Ursa Major
- Right ascension: 09^{h} 11^{m} 37.5^{s}
- Declination: 60° 02′ 14″
- Redshift: 1,353±5 km/s
- Distance: 63.6 ± 11.7 Mly (19.5 ± 3.6 Mpc)
- Apparent magnitude (V): 9.9

Characteristics
- Type: S0 1/2
- Apparent size (V): 6.4′ × 3.0′

Other designations
- NGC 2768, UGC 4821, PGC 25915

NGC 2768 is a lenticular galaxy in the northern constellation of Ursa Major. It is located at a distance of 65 million light years from Earth. NGC 2768 is an example of a Seyfert galaxy, an object with a supermassive black hole at its centre. A dusty structure is encircling the centre of the galaxy, forming a knotted ring around the galaxy's brightly glowing middle. This ring lies perpendicular to the plane of NGC 2768 itself, stretching up and out of the galaxy. The dust in NGC 2768 forms an intricate network of knots and filaments.

In the centre of the galaxy are two tiny, S-shaped symmetric jets. These two flows of material travel outwards from the galactic centre along curved paths, and are masked by the tangle of dark dust lanes that spans the body of the galaxy. These jets are a sign of a very active centre, where lies a supermassive black hole. This speeds up and sucks in gas from the nearby space, creating a stream of material swirling inwards towards the black hole known as an accretion disc. This disk throws off material in very energetic outbursts, creating structures like the jets.

== Supernova ==
One supernova has been observed in NGC 2768:

- SN 2000ds (Type Ib, mag. 17.9) was discovered by Tim Puckett and G. Dowdle on 10 October 2000. It occurred 9".1 west and 32".1 south of the nuclear region.

== Gallery ==
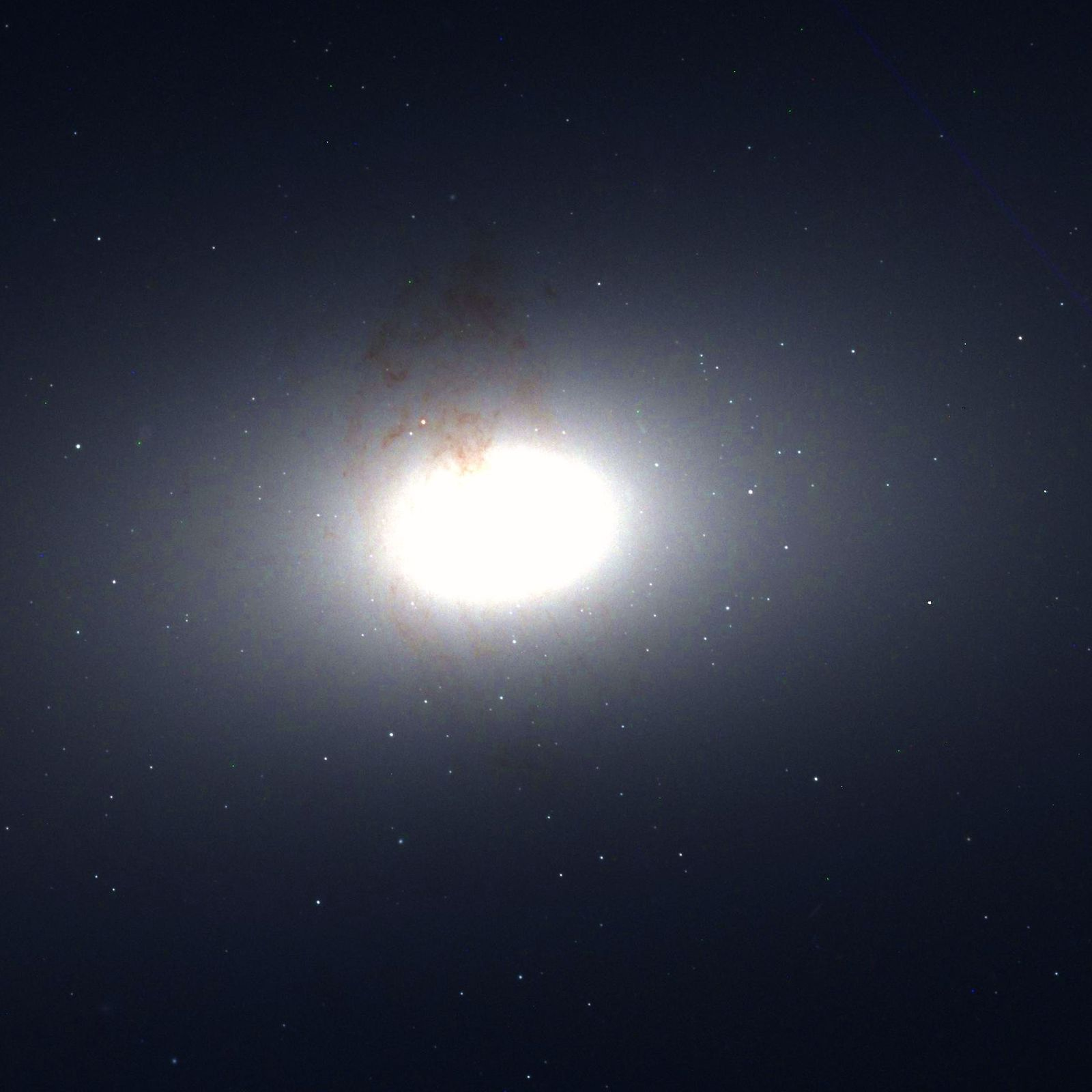
HST image of NGC 2768

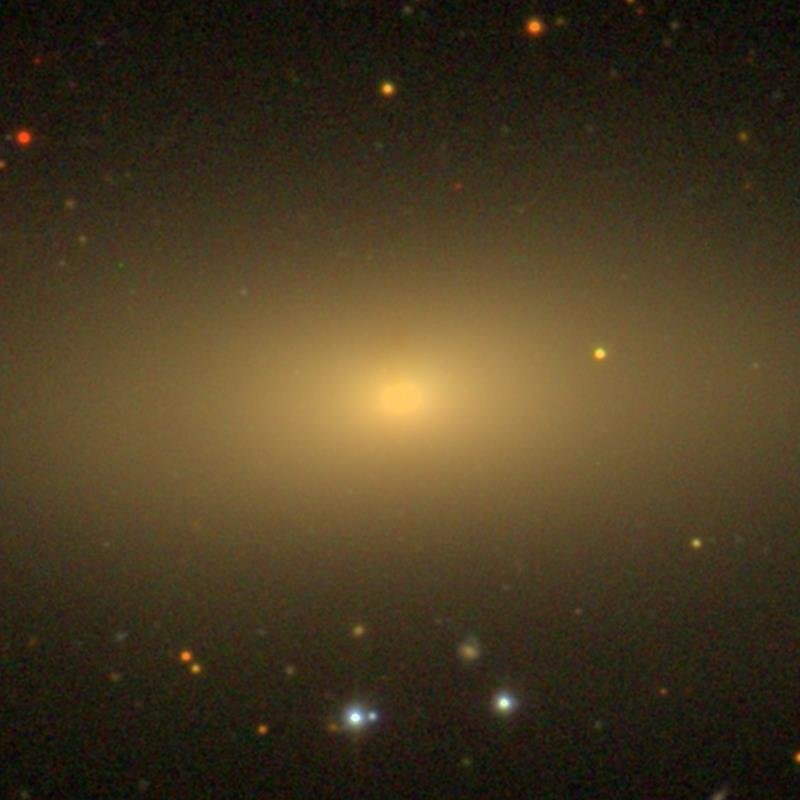
NGC 2768 (SDSS DR14)
