= NGC 3245 =

Galaxy in the constellation Leo Minor

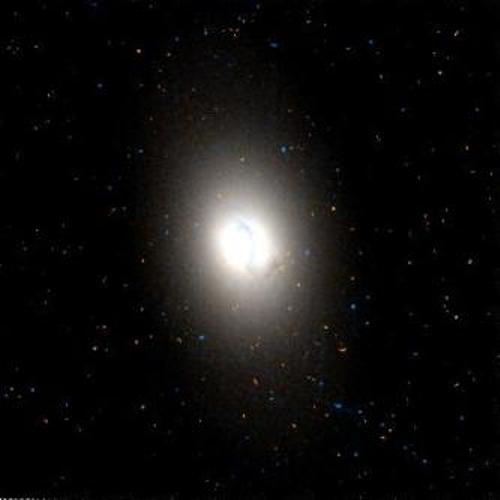
- Hubble Space Telescope image of NGC 3245

Observation data (J2000 epoch)
- Constellation: Leo Minor
- Right ascension: 10^{h} 27^{m} 18^{s}
- Declination: +28° 30′ 26″
- Redshift: 0.004423
- Heliocentric radial velocity: 1,326±5 km/s
- Apparent magnitude (V): 10.7
- Apparent magnitude (B): 11.6

Characteristics
- Type: SA(r)0^0^
- Apparent size (V): 3.2′ × 1.8′

Other designations
- NGC 3245,MCG+05-25-013, LEDA 30744

NGC 3245 is a lenticular galaxy in the constellation Leo Minor. It was discovered by German-British astronomer William Herschel on April 11, 1785. The galaxy has an apparent visual magnitude of 10.7 and spans an angular size of 3.2′ × 1.8′. It is located at a distance of 68 million light-years (20.9 Mpc). The morphological classification of NGC 3245 is SA(r)0^0^, which is consistent with a lenticular galaxy (SA0) possessing a ring-like structure (r).

There is a circumnuclear dust with a radius of 1.1″, which corresponds to a radius of 360 ly (110 pc). The rotational motion of this disk is consistent with a supermassive black hole at the core with a mass of (2.1±0.5)×10^{8} M_{☉}, or 210 million times the mass of the Sun.

This is a member of the NGC 3254 Group of galaxies, which is a member of the Leo II Groups, a series of galaxies and galaxy clusters strung out from the right edge of the Virgo Supercluster.

== See also ==
- List of NGC objects (3001–4000)
