= NGC 5557 =

Galaxy in the constellation Boötes

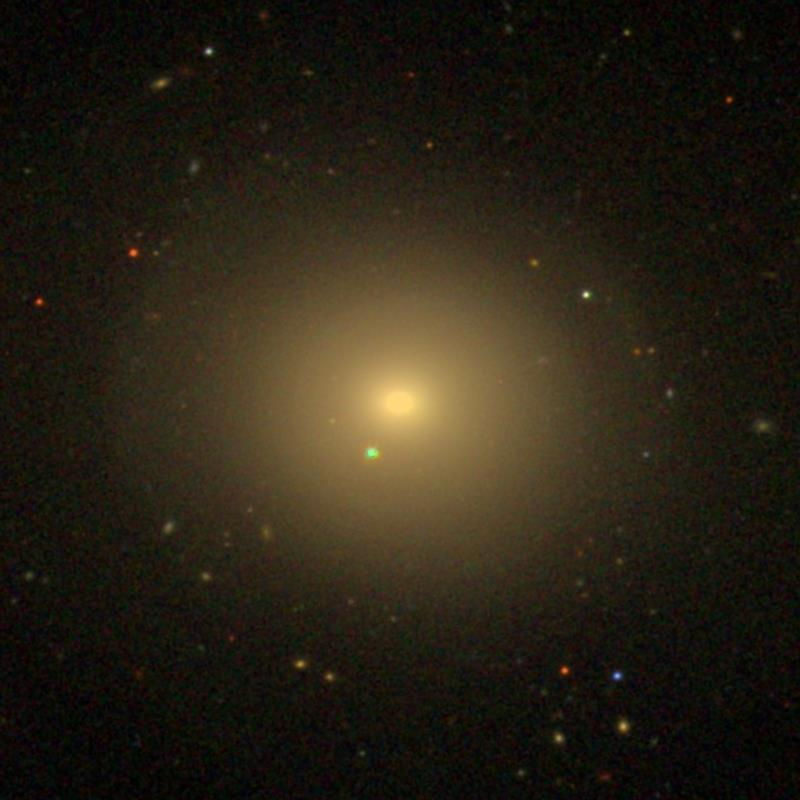
- SDSS image of NGC 5557

Observation data (J2000 epoch)
- Constellation: Boötes
- Right ascension: 14^{h} 18^{m} 25.708^{s}
- Declination: +36° 29′ 37.28″
- Redshift: 0.010764
- Heliocentric radial velocity: 3210 ± 28 km/s
- Distance: 127 Mly (38.8 Mpc)
- Apparent magnitude (V): 12.2
- Absolute magnitude (V): −22.39

Characteristics
- Type: E1

Other designations
- UGC 9161, MCG +06-31-093, PGC 51104

NGC 5557 is an elliptical galaxy in the constellation Boötes. It was discovered by William Herschel on May 1, 1785. The distance to NGC 5557 is not well known, but it is estimated to be about 127 million light-years (38.8 megaparsecs) away.

NGC 5557 is quite massive, with a K-band absolute magnitude of −24.8, and is a slow rotator, which suggests it gained mass through dry mergers (galaxy mergers involving galaxies significant amounts of gas). However, it has a faint tidal tail to its east, as well as a more complex structure to the west. This structure, if found to be connected to NGC 5557, would one of the largest around a galaxy, spanning about 1.1 million light-years (350,000 parsecs). This filamentary structure suggests that NGC 5557 may have formed from a more gas-rich galaxy merger a couple billion years ago. This implies that the galaxy merger would need to have a low impact parameter.

NGC 5557 is part of a galaxy group, and is the largest such galaxy in the group by far. Surrounding the galaxy near the eastern filament are several small bluish objects, which are possibly tidal dwarf galaxies.

== Supernovae ==
Two supernovae have been observed in NGC 5557:

- SN 1996aa (Type Ia, mag. 17) was discovered by Wayne Johnson on 16 May 1996.
- SN 2013gn (Type Ia, mag. 15.3) was discovered by Kōichi Itagaki on 16 November 2013.
