= NGC 4596 =

Galaxy in the constellation Virgo

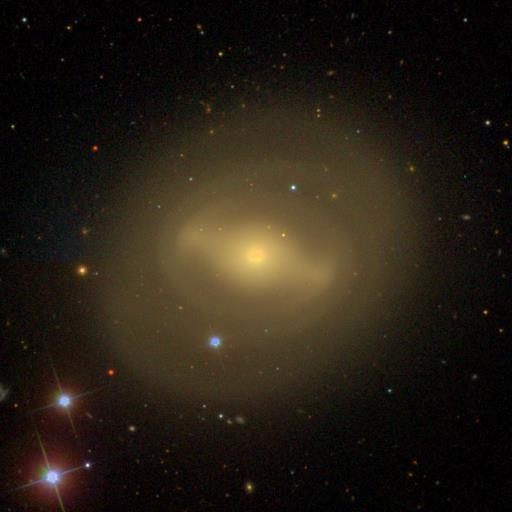
- Sloan Digital Sky Survey image of NGC 4596.

Observation data (J2000 epoch)
- Constellation: Virgo
- Right ascension: 12^{h} 39^{m} 55.9^{s}
- Declination: 10° 10′ 34″
- Redshift: 0.006311
- Heliocentric radial velocity: 1,892 km/s
- Distance: 55 Mly (16.8 Mpc)
- Group or cluster: Virgo Cluster
- Apparent magnitude (V): 10.5

Characteristics
- Type: SB0^+(r)
- Size: ~55,700 ly (17.08 kpc) (estimated)
- Apparent size (V): 4.0′ × 3.0′

Other designations
- NGC 4596, UGC 7828, MCG 2-32-170, PGC 42401, CGCG 70-206

NGC 4596 is a barred lenticular galaxy in the constellation Virgo. NGC 4596 was discovered by German-British astronomer William Herschel on March 15, 1784. It has an apparent visual magnitude of 10.5 and spans an angular size of 4.0′ × 3.0′. NGC 4596 is located about 55 million light-years away, where it is a member of the Virgo Cluster of galaxies.

The galactic plane of NGC 4596 is inclined at an angle of about 38° to the plane of the sky. The morphological classification of NGC 4596 is SB0^+(r), indicating a barred lenticular galaxy (SB0) with an inner ring structure (r). It has a strong bar with bright ansae at the ends. Two diffuse spiral arms branch off from the ends of the bar and form an inner pseudoring that is well-defined. The spiral arms continue out and fade rapidly in the bright outer disk. At the core of NGC 4596 is a supermassive black hole with an estimated mass of 78 million suns (7.8×10^{7} M☉).
