= NGC 6426 =

Globular cluster in the constellation Ophiuchus

- NGC 6426 imaged by Hubble Space Telescope

Observation data (J2000 epoch)
- Class: IX
- Constellation: Ophiuchus
- Right ascension: 17^{h} 44^{m} 54.71^{s}
- Declination: +03° 10′ 12.5″
- Distance: 67 kly (20.6 kpc)
- Apparent magnitude (V): 10.9
- Apparent dimensions (V): 4.2′

Physical characteristics
- Metallicity: [Fe/H] = –2.34 dex
- Estimated age: 13.0±1.5 Gyr
- Other designations: NGC 6426, Cr 346

NGC 6426 is a globular cluster of stars located in the equatorial constellation of Ophiuchus. It was discovered by the German-English astronomer William Herschel on 3 June 1786. This cluster is at a distance of 67,000 light years from the Sun. It has an apparent visual magnitude of 10.9 and an angular diameter of 4.2′, making it difficult to observe with a small telescope.

This cluster is orbiting in the outer galactic halo at a distance of 47 kly (14.4 kpc) from the Galactic Core. It is one of the oldest and most metal-poor clusters in the Milky Way system. NGC 6426 has an angular half-light radius of 0.92′ and a tidal radius of 13.0′, with a Shapley–Sawyer Concentration Class of IX. It is an estimated 13.0±1.5 billion years old. Chemical abundances of four members at the tip of the red giant branch suggests there may have been at least two generations of stars, with the older stars enriching a younger generation with elements including Mg, Si, and Zn. There is also some indication of hypernova enrichment of the pre-cluster medium by lighter alpha process elements.

Based on the spectra of a dozen identified RR Lyrae variables, this is classified as an Oosterhoff type II cluster. In 2012, a carbon star was discovered near the center of the cluster.
