= NGC 4293 =

Galaxy in the constellation Coma Berenices

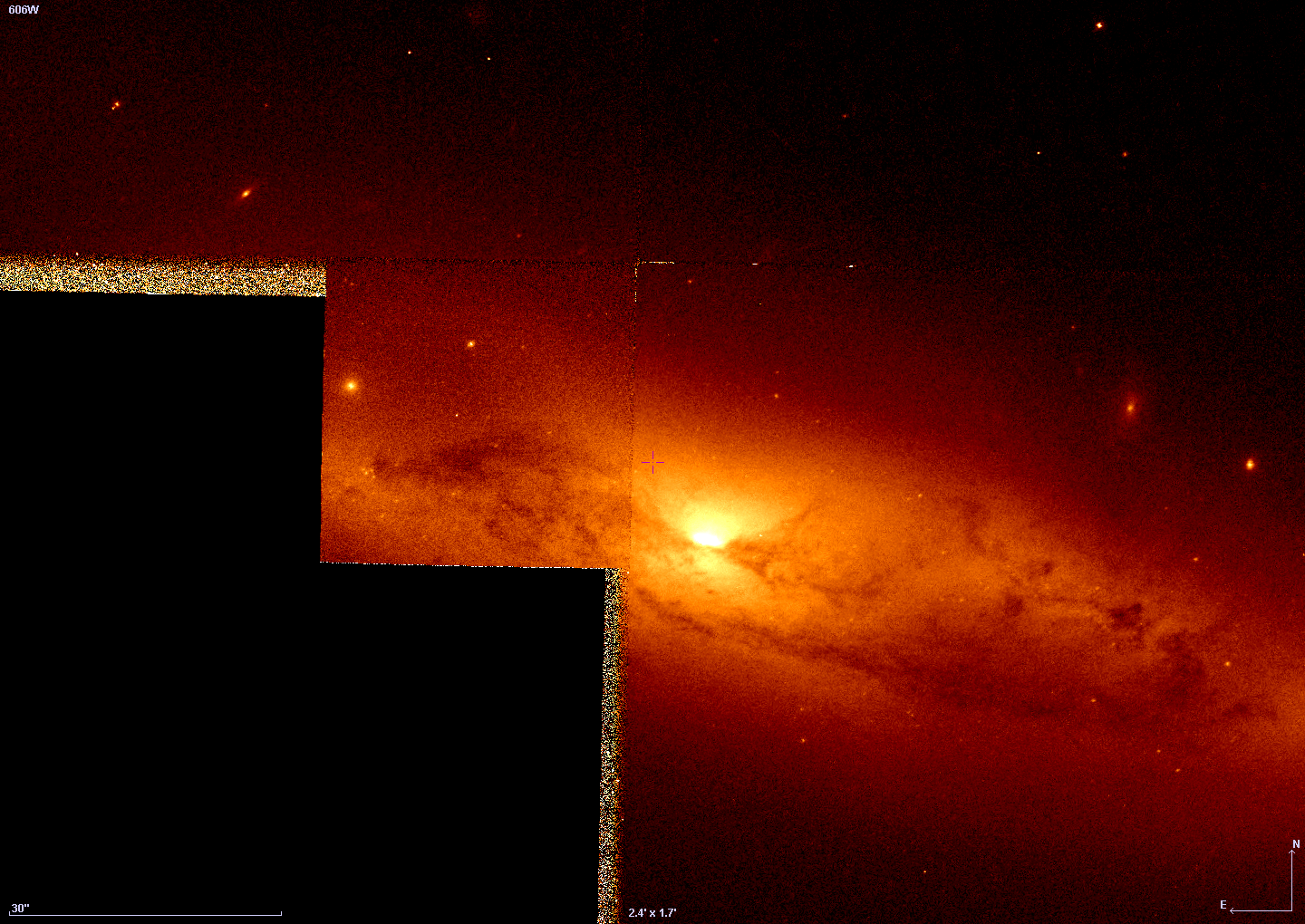
- Partial image of NGC 4293 taken by the Hubble Space Telescope

Observation data (J2000 epoch)
- Constellation: Coma Berenices
- Right ascension: 12^{h} 21^{m} 12.891^{s}
- Declination: +18° 22′ 56.64″
- Redshift: 0.002977
- Heliocentric radial velocity: 893
- Distance: 54 Mly (16.5 Mpc)
- Group or cluster: Virgo Cluster
- Apparent magnitude (V): 10.4

Characteristics
- Type: (R)SB(s)0/a
- Apparent size (V): 5.293′ × 1.800′

Other designations
- 2MASX J12211289+1822566, IRAS 12186+1839, LEDA 39907, UGC 7405, UZC J122112.6+182256, Z 99-23, VCC 460.

NGC 4293 is a lenticular galaxy in the northern constellation of Coma Berenices. It was discovered by English astronomer William Herschel on March 14, 1784, who described it as "large, extended, resolvable, 6 or 7′ long". This galaxy is positioned to the north-northwest of the star 11 Comae Berenices and is a member of the Virgo Cluster of galaxies. It is assumed to lie at the same distance as the Virgo Cluster itself: around 54 million light years away. The galaxy spans an apparent area of 5.3 × 3.1 arc minutes.

The morphological classification of NGC 4293 is (R)SB(s)0/a, with the SB0/a indicating this has just distinguishable tightly wound spiral arms with a bar structure at the nucleus. An '(s)' notation means that this galaxy does not have a ring-like structure around the nucleus. Star formation within NGC 4293 is only taking place within a confined region at the center of the galaxy. The outer stellar disk of the galaxy appears disturbed, suggesting some form of gravitational interaction.

This is a common type of active galaxy known as a LINER, which means that the optical spectrum is dominated by emission lines from gases in low energy ionization states. The activity may be the result of a supermassive black hole (SMBH) in the nucleus that is undergoing a low rate of matter accretion. The estimated mass of such an SMBH is 5.9×10^{7} M_{☉}. Radio emission from thermal activity has been detected from the proximity of this object.

== Gallery ==
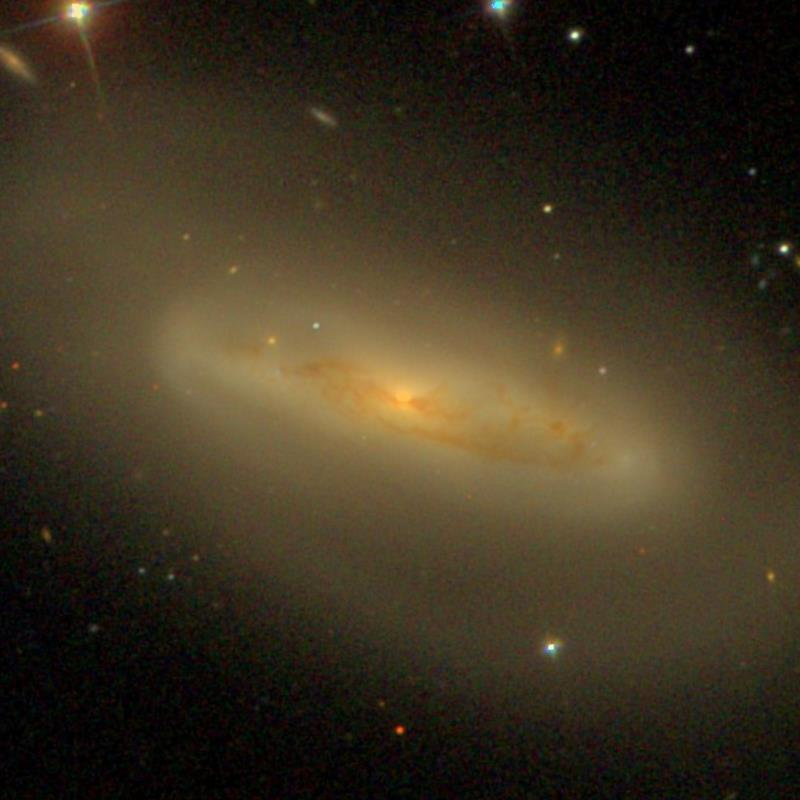
NGC 4293 (SDSS DR14)

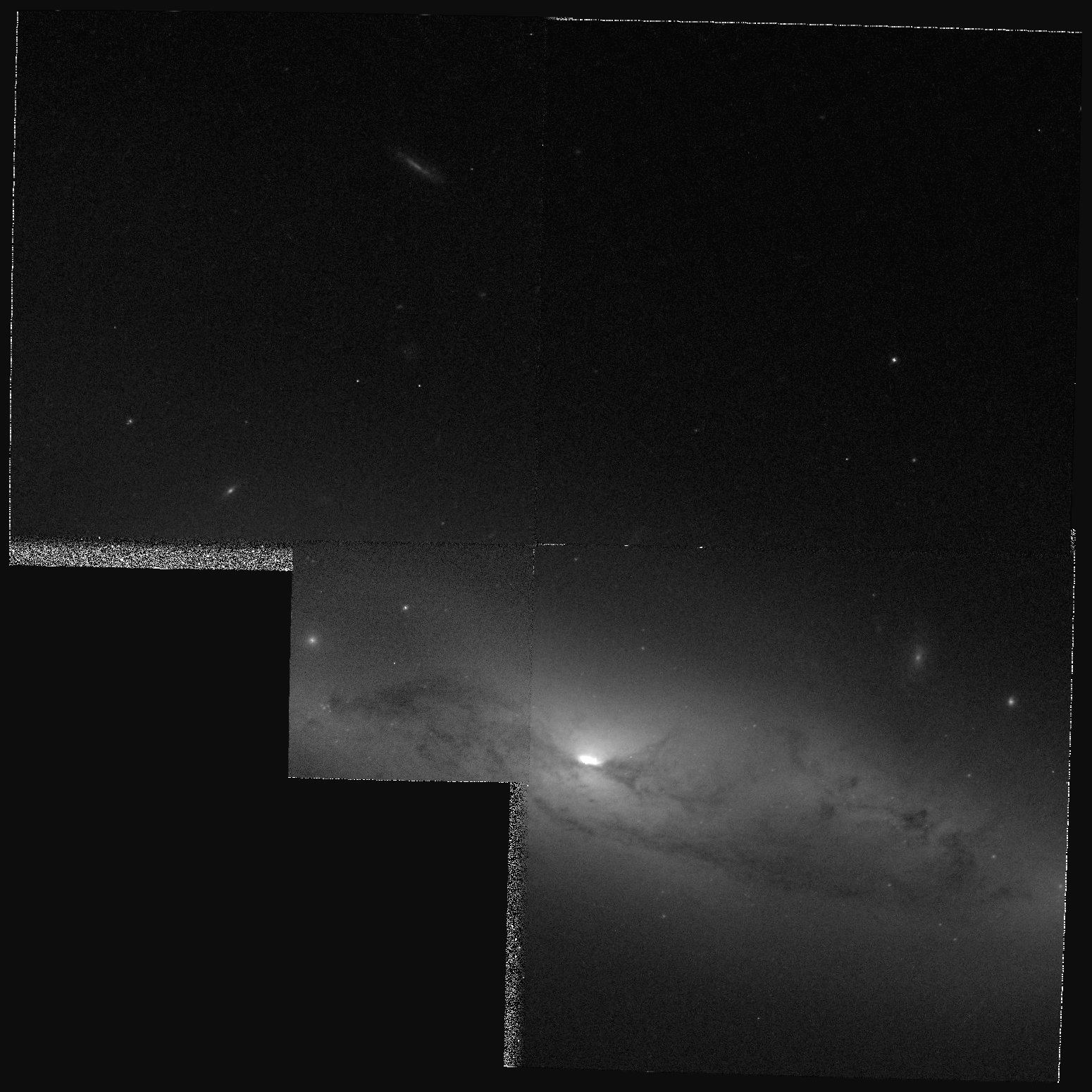
NGC 4293 by Hubble Space Telescope
