= NGC 5631 =

NGC object

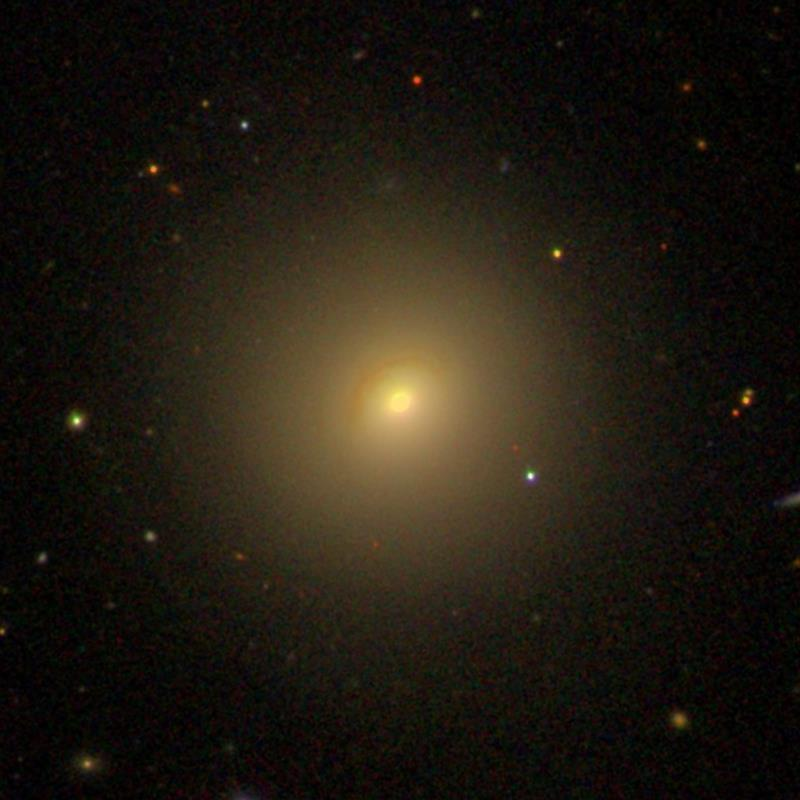

Observation data (J2000.0 epoch)
- Constellation: Ursa Major
- Right ascension: 14^{h} 26^{m} 33.3^{s}
- Declination: +56° 34′ 57″
- Redshift: 0.006608±0.000082
- Heliocentric radial velocity: 1,984±4 km/s
- Distance: 92.76 ± 0.46 Mly (28.44 ± .14 Mpc)
- Apparent magnitude (V): 12.55
- Apparent magnitude (B): 13.51
- Surface brightness: 22.6 mag/arcsec^{2}
- Magnitude (J): 9.386±0.013
- Magnitude (H): 8.673±0.016
- Magnitude (K): 8.466±0.02

Characteristics
- Type: SA C
- Mass: 7.7×10^{10} M_{☉}
- Mass/Light ratio: 0.580 M_{☉}/L_{☉}
- Size: 65,000 ly
- Apparent size (V): 2.0′ × 2.0′
- Half-light radius (apparent): 21

Other designations
- NGC 5631, UGC 9261, PGC 51564

NGC 5631 is a lenticular galaxy in the constellation Ursa Major. It was discovered on April 17, 1789 by the astronomer William Herschel.
