= NGC 4660 =

Galaxy in the constellation Virgo

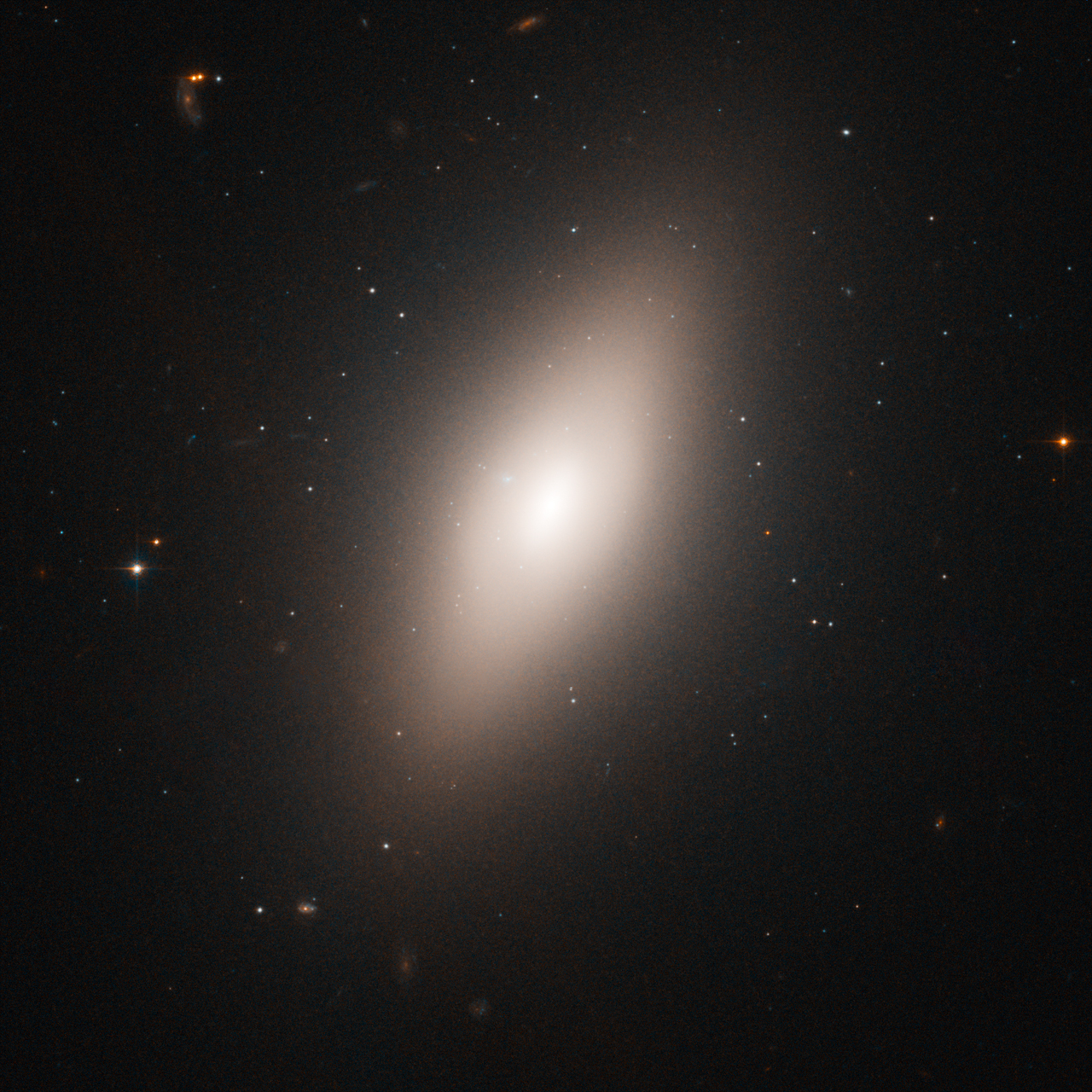
- HST image of NGC 4660.

Observation data (J2000 epoch)
- Constellation: Virgo
- Right ascension: 12^{h} 44^{m} 32.0^{s}
- Declination: 11° 11′ 26″
- Redshift: 0.003612
- Heliocentric radial velocity: 1,083 km/s
- Distance: 63 Mly (19.2 Mpc)
- Group or cluster: Virgo Cluster
- Apparent magnitude (V): 11.2

Characteristics
- Type: E5
- Size: ~39,500 ly (12.10 kpc) (estimated)
- Apparent size (V): 2.1′ × 1.7′

Other designations
- NGC 4660, UGC 7914, MCG 2-33-6, PGC 42917, CGCG 71-23

NGC 4660 is an elliptical galaxy in the constellation Virgo. The galaxy was discovered by German-British astronomer William Herschel on March 15, 1784. It is located about 63 million light-years away, where it is a member of the Virgo Cluster.

NGC 4660 forms a tight pair with Messier 59.

== Tidal filament ==
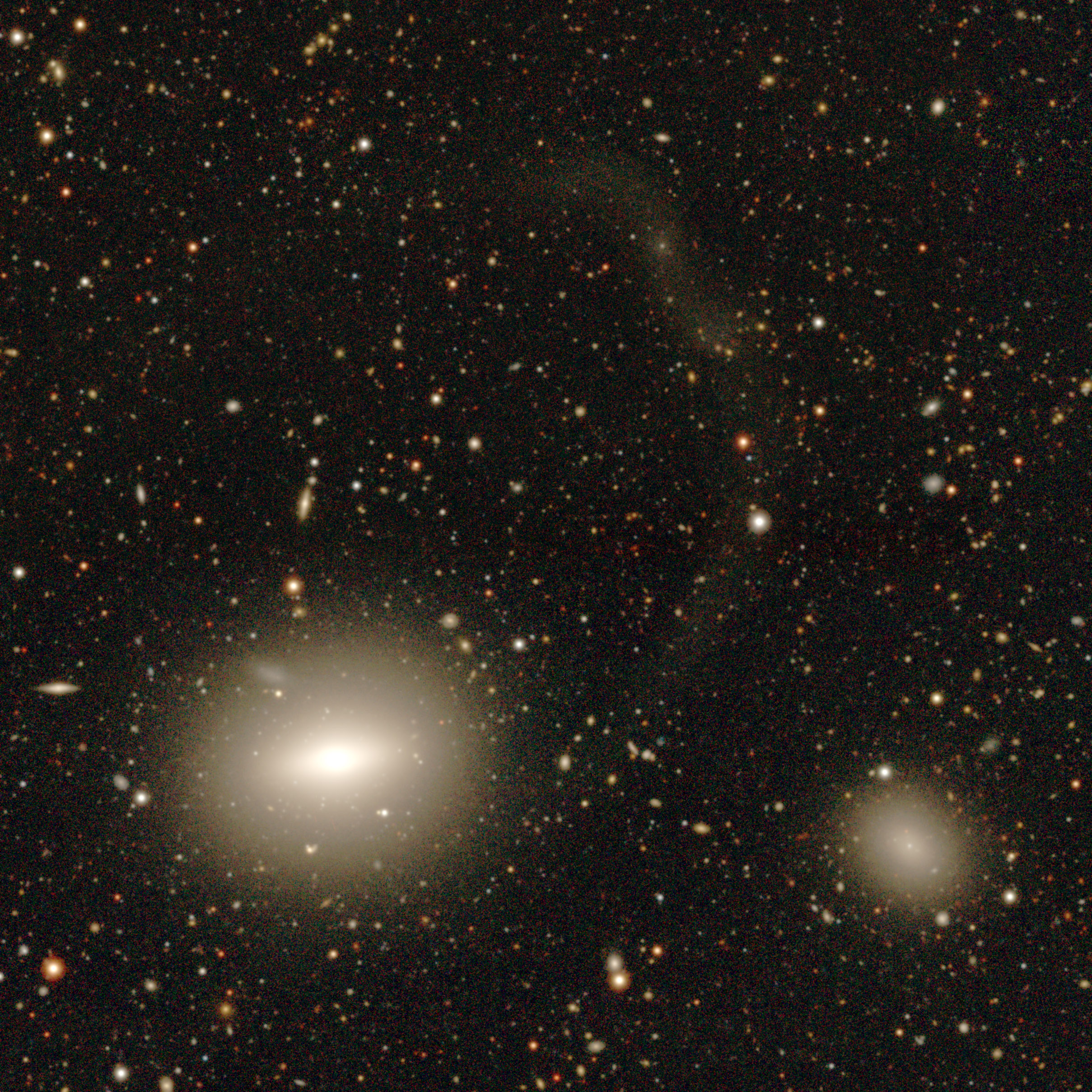
The filament of NGC 4660 (left) with legacy surveys. On the right is IC 3711.

A long tidal filament was detected associated with NGC 4660. This appears to indicate a past gravitational interaction with another galaxy. The progenitor galaxy that may have produced the filament associated with NGC 4660 was a gas-rich spiral. Alternatively, the detection of tidal dwarf galaxies (TDGs) which are “recycled” low-mass galaxies formed from interactions or mergers suggest that the filament originated from a possible satellite galaxy that got stripped during its closest approach in its orbit to NGC 4660. This would make the filament a tidal stream comparable to the stream associated with the Sagittarius Dwarf Spheroidal Galaxy of the Milky Way.

== Supermassive black hole ==
NGC 4660 may have a supermassive black hole with an estimated mass of 800 million suns (8×10^{8} M☉).
