= Christopher Aikman =

Canadian astrophysicist

G Christopher L Aikman
- Born: November 11, 1943 (age 83); Ottawa, Ontario, Canada
- Known for: Secretary of Canadian Astronomical Society (1983-89)
- Spouse: Hendrika Marshall Aikman
- Awards: Royal Astronomical Society of Canada Service Award (1983)
- Scientific career
- Fields: Stellar compositions, asteroids & comets

Asteroids discovered: 6
7840 Hendrika	October 5, 1994
10870 Gwendolen	September 25, 1996
24899 Dominiona	January 14, 1997
670744 Karsh	January 14, 1997
826930 Charlottesmall	September 10, 1997
246913 Slocum	September 23, 1998

Christopher Aikman is a Canadian astrophysicist who spent most of his career (from 1968 to 2000) at the Dominion Astrophysical Observatory, National Research Council Canada in Saanich, British Columbia, Canada.

== Early life and education ==
An early interest in astronomy led Aikman to join the Royal Astronomical Society of Canada Quebec Centre in 1958, at the age of 15.

He received a B.Sc. from Bishop's University in 1965 and a M.Sc. from the University of Toronto in 1968. His thesis was based on microwave surveys of selected emission nebulae in the northern Milky Way made with the 46-m radio telescope of the Algonquin Radio Observatory, including the emission nebula IC1795. This revealed what is perhaps the youngest high-mass stellar object in the Galaxy, namely W3(OH), a cocoon star invisible at optical wavelengths but surrounded by a rapidly expanding ultracompact HII region, all within a dense obscuring dust shell. W3(OH) had previously been located in 1966 as the source of the first radio-identified astrophysical maser.

== Career ==
He began working for the Dominion Astrophysical Observatory in 1968 as the Director's scientific assistant. His initial research was on the spectroscopy of comets, and of chemically peculiar stars whose surface compositions differ markedly from that of the Sun, with the aim of understanding the origin of their anomalies. This led to the discovery of a chemically peculiar star, HR 7775, having extraordinary enhancements of the elements gold and platinum in its atmosphere.

A twenty-year study of the B6III star 3 Vulpeculae by D. P. Hube and Aikman eventually contributed to the recognition of a group of hot, variable stars now known as slowly pulsating B-type stars (SPB stars).

From 1991, he conducted a program of tracking newly discovered Earth approaching asteroids with the historic telescope built by John S. Plaskett. Incidentally the program led to the recovery and numbering of lost asteroids, plus the discoveries of new ones. The project was cancelled in 1997.

== Selected publications ==
- Aikman, G.C.; Macrae, Donald A. (1968). "Radio Components of IC 1795". Astronomical Journal. 73: S1. Bibcode:1968AJS....73S...1A.
- Aikman, G.C.L; Balfour, W.; Tatum, J. B. (1974). "The Cyanogen Bands of Comet Bennett 1970 II". Icarus. 21 (3): 303–316. Bibcode:1974Icar...21..303A. doi:10.1016/0019-1035(74)90045-1.
- Aikman, G.C.L; Goldberg, B.A. (1974). "The Orbit and Nature of θ2 Orionis A". Journal of the Royal Astronomical Society of Canada. 68: 205–212. Bibcode:1974JRASC..68..205A.
- Cowley, C. R.; Aikman, G.C.L. (1975). "Nuclear and nonnuclear abundance patterns in the manganese stars". Astrophysical Journal. 196: 521–524. Bibcode:1975ApJ...196..521C. doi:10.1086/153432.
- Aikman, G.C. (1976). "The spectroscopic binary characteristics of the mercury-manganese stars". Publications of the DAO. 14: 379–410. Bibcode:1976PDAO...14..379A.
- Cowley, C.R.; Cowley, A.P.; Aikman, G.C.L.; Crosswhite, H.M. (1977). "Element identifications in Przybylski's star". Astrophysical Journal. 216: 37–41. Bibcode:1977ApJ...216...37C. doi:10.1086/155440.
- Aikman, G.C.L.; Cowley, C.R.; Crosswhite, H.M. (1979). "Dysprosium III lines in the spectra of peculiar A and B stars". Astrophysical Journal. 232: 812–818. Bibcode:1979ApJ...232..812A. doi:10.1086/157342.
- Cowley, C.R.; Sears, R.L.; Aikman, G.C.L.; Sadakane, K. (1982). "Possible iron abundance variations among superficially normal A stars". Astrophysical Journal. 254: 191–195. Bibcode:1982ApJ...254..191C. doi:10.1016/0032-0633(94)90036-1.
- McFadzean, A.D.; Skillen, I.; Carr, D.M.; Aikman, G.C.L. (1986). "The triple system DM Persei". Monthly Notices of the Royal Astronomical Society. 222: 167–187. Bibcode:1986MNRAS.222..167H. doi:10.1093/mnras/222.1.167.
- McFadzean, A.D.; Hilditch, R.W.; Hill, G.; Aikman, G.C.L.; Fisher, W.A. (1987). "The South Galactic Pole – Radial velocities of 157 O-F8 stars". Monthly Notices of the Royal Astronomical Society. 224 (2): 393–402. Bibcode:1987MNRAS.224..393M. doi:10.1093/mnras/224.2.393.
- Aikman, G.C.L.; Younger, P.F.; Weichert, D.H. (1989). "The daylight fireball of January 20, 1988". Journal of the Royal Astronomical Society of Canada. 83: 232–249. Bibcode:1989JRASC..83..232A.
- Hube, Douglas; Aikman, G.C.L. (1991). "3 Vulpeculae: A non-radial pulsator in a one-year binary system". Publications of the Astronomical Society of the Pacific. 103 (659): 49–62. Bibcode:1991PASP..103...49H. doi:10.1086/132794.
- Tatum, J.B.; Balam, D.D.; Aikman, G.C.L. (1994). "Astrometric recovery and follow-up of near-Earth asteroids". Planetary and Space Science. 42 (8): 611–621. Bibcode:1994P&SS...42..611T. doi:10.1016/0032-0633(94)90036-1.
- Aikman, G.C.L.; Hesser, J.E. (1989). "Annual Report of the Dominion Astrophysical Observatory, 1 Apr 1987 – 31 Mar 1988". Bulletin of the American Astronomical Society. 21 (1): 180–190. Bibcode:1989BAAS...21..180A.
- Aikman, G.C.L.; Hesser, J.E. (1998). "Annual Report of the Dominion Astrophysical Observatory, 1 Apr 1996 – 31 Mar 1997". Bulletin of the American Astronomical Society. 30 (1): 472–489. Bibcode:1998BAAS...30..472A.
