= List of minor planets: 670001–671000 =

The following is a partial list of minor planets, running from minor-planet number 670001 through 671000, inclusive. The primary data for this and other partial lists is based on JPL's "Small-Body Orbital Elements" and data available from the Minor Planet Center. Critical list information is also provided by the MPC, unless otherwise specified from Lowell Observatory. A detailed description of the table's columns and additional sources are given on the main page including a complete list of every page in this series, and a statistical break-up on the dynamical classification of minor planets.

Also see the summary list of all named bodies in numerical and alphabetical order, and the corresponding naming citations for the number range of this particular list. New namings may only be added to this list after official publication, as the preannouncement of names is condemned by the Working Group for Small Bodies Nomenclature of the International Astronomical Union.

Near-Earth obj.	MBA (inner)	MBA (outer)	Centaur
Mars-crosser	MBA (middle)	Jupiter trojan	Trans-Neptunian obj.
Unclassified

== 670001–670100 ==
Designation			Discovery			Properties		Ref
Permanent	Provisional	Named after	Date	Site	Discoverer(s)	Category	Diam.	Ref
670001	2013 EV_{73}	—	December 3, 2005	Mauna Kea	A. Boattini	·	940 m	MPC · JPL
670002	2013 ES_{74}	—	March 7, 2013	Mount Lemmon	Mount Lemmon Survey	·	880 m	MPC · JPL
670003	2013 EV_{74}	—	April 24, 2006	Kitt Peak	Spacewatch	·	970 m	MPC · JPL
670004	2013 EY_{78}	—	October 21, 2006	Mount Lemmon	Mount Lemmon Survey	·	2.0 km	MPC · JPL
670005	2013 EA_{79}	—	November 2, 2010	Mount Lemmon	Mount Lemmon Survey	HYG	2.4 km	MPC · JPL
670006	2013 EO_{79}	—	April 2, 2006	Kitt Peak	Spacewatch	MAS	660 m	MPC · JPL
670007	2013 EO_{84}	—	March 8, 2013	Haleakala	Pan-STARRS 1	·	860 m	MPC · JPL
670008	2013 ER_{84}	—	March 8, 2013	Haleakala	Pan-STARRS 1	·	2.7 km	MPC · JPL
670009	2013 EY_{87}	—	March 12, 2013	Mount Lemmon	Mount Lemmon Survey	·	1.1 km	MPC · JPL
670010	2013 EB_{88}	—	March 12, 2013	Palomar	Palomar Transient Factory	·	2.3 km	MPC · JPL
670011	2013 EH_{89}	—	March 12, 2013	Siding Spring	SSS	APO	340 m	MPC · JPL
670012	2013 EJ_{90}	—	April 8, 2010	Kitt Peak	Spacewatch	·	1.2 km	MPC · JPL
670013	2013 ED_{93}	—	January 10, 2006	Kitt Peak	Spacewatch	·	720 m	MPC · JPL
670014	2013 EO_{94}	—	March 6, 2013	Haleakala	Pan-STARRS 1	LIX	2.7 km	MPC · JPL
670015	2013 EO_{95}	—	December 30, 2008	Mount Lemmon	Mount Lemmon Survey	·	840 m	MPC · JPL
670016	2013 EY_{95}	—	March 8, 2013	Haleakala	Pan-STARRS 1	NYS	1.1 km	MPC · JPL
670017	2013 EU_{96}	—	March 8, 2013	Haleakala	Pan-STARRS 1	·	2.1 km	MPC · JPL
670018	2013 EG_{98}	—	September 14, 2005	Kitt Peak	Spacewatch	·	2.7 km	MPC · JPL
670019	2013 EN_{100}	—	February 28, 2008	Mount Lemmon	Mount Lemmon Survey	KOR	1.4 km	MPC · JPL
670020	2013 EF_{101}	—	December 18, 2001	Socorro	LINEAR	·	1.2 km	MPC · JPL
670021	2013 EJ_{102}	—	March 27, 2008	Kitt Peak	Spacewatch	·	2.5 km	MPC · JPL
670022	2013 EE_{103}	—	October 23, 2011	Haleakala	Pan-STARRS 1	·	2.5 km	MPC · JPL
670023	2013 EM_{103}	—	January 15, 2013	ESA OGS	ESA OGS	·	830 m	MPC · JPL
670024	2013 EH_{104}	—	March 12, 2013	Mount Lemmon	Mount Lemmon Survey	·	920 m	MPC · JPL
670025	2013 ET_{108}	—	March 15, 2013	Atacama	IAA-AI	H	440 m	MPC · JPL
670026	2013 EB_{111}	—	September 4, 2010	Mount Lemmon	Mount Lemmon Survey	·	1.9 km	MPC · JPL
670027	2013 ED_{112}	—	April 7, 2008	Kitt Peak	Spacewatch	·	2.0 km	MPC · JPL
670028	2013 EN_{113}	—	November 24, 2011	Haleakala	Pan-STARRS 1	·	2.3 km	MPC · JPL
670029	2013 EO_{113}	—	February 10, 2002	Socorro	LINEAR	NYS	770 m	MPC · JPL
670030	2013 EE_{114}	—	January 10, 2008	Vail-Jarnac	Jarnac	·	2.1 km	MPC · JPL
670031	2013 EA_{118}	—	September 13, 2007	Mount Lemmon	Mount Lemmon Survey	·	940 m	MPC · JPL
670032	2013 EW_{118}	—	October 19, 2007	Črni Vrh	Mikuž, H.	·	2.0 km	MPC · JPL
670033	2013 ER_{119}	—	May 9, 2008	Siding Spring	SSS	TIR	3.7 km	MPC · JPL
670034	2013 EY_{120}	—	April 13, 2002	Kitt Peak	Spacewatch	·	3.0 km	MPC · JPL
670035	2013 EO_{121}	—	March 20, 2002	Kitt Peak	Spacewatch	·	2.7 km	MPC · JPL
670036	2013 EW_{123}	—	March 15, 2013	Mount Lemmon	Mount Lemmon Survey	·	2.1 km	MPC · JPL
670037	2013 EY_{125}	—	September 26, 2005	Kitt Peak	Spacewatch	·	2.8 km	MPC · JPL
670038	2013 EA_{128}	—	December 23, 2012	Haleakala	Pan-STARRS 1	·	2.7 km	MPC · JPL
670039	2013 EM_{131}	—	February 14, 2013	Haleakala	Pan-STARRS 1	·	1.6 km	MPC · JPL
670040	2013 EF_{134}	—	September 17, 2009	Kitt Peak	Spacewatch	·	2.2 km	MPC · JPL
670041	2013 EA_{142}	—	March 13, 2013	Kitt Peak	M. W. Buie	·	2.3 km	MPC · JPL
670042	2013 EE_{157}	—	January 16, 2009	Kitt Peak	Spacewatch	·	940 m	MPC · JPL
670043	2013 EL_{158}	—	March 11, 2013	Mount Lemmon	Mount Lemmon Survey	PHO	810 m	MPC · JPL
670044	2013 EC_{159}	—	September 25, 2016	Haleakala	Pan-STARRS 1	·	3.2 km	MPC · JPL
670045	2013 EE_{159}	—	March 13, 2013	Haleakala	Pan-STARRS 1	·	2.9 km	MPC · JPL
670046	2013 EP_{159}	—	March 5, 2013	Mount Lemmon	Mount Lemmon Survey	·	2.0 km	MPC · JPL
670047	2013 EH_{160}	—	August 30, 2016	Mount Lemmon	Mount Lemmon Survey	·	2.3 km	MPC · JPL
670048	2013 EV_{160}	—	March 4, 2013	Haleakala	Pan-STARRS 1	·	880 m	MPC · JPL
670049	2013 EQ_{162}	—	March 14, 2013	Mount Lemmon	Mount Lemmon Survey	THB	2.8 km	MPC · JPL
670050	2013 EY_{162}	—	March 15, 2013	Kitt Peak	Spacewatch	·	2.4 km	MPC · JPL
670051	2013 ED_{163}	—	November 16, 2017	Mount Lemmon	Mount Lemmon Survey	·	2.5 km	MPC · JPL
670052	2013 EB_{164}	—	January 17, 2007	Kitt Peak	Spacewatch	·	2.2 km	MPC · JPL
670053	2013 EH_{165}	—	May 26, 2014	Haleakala	Pan-STARRS 1	·	1.8 km	MPC · JPL
670054	2013 EH_{167}	—	March 5, 2013	Mount Lemmon	Mount Lemmon Survey	·	2.2 km	MPC · JPL
670055	2013 EG_{168}	—	March 5, 2013	Haleakala	Pan-STARRS 1	EOS	1.4 km	MPC · JPL
670056	2013 EX_{168}	—	March 13, 2013	Palomar	Palomar Transient Factory	·	990 m	MPC · JPL
670057	2013 EU_{169}	—	March 13, 2013	Kitt Peak	Spacewatch	NYS	780 m	MPC · JPL
670058	2013 EM_{172}	—	March 5, 2013	Haleakala	Pan-STARRS 1	·	2.5 km	MPC · JPL
670059	2013 EM_{177}	—	March 5, 2013	Mount Lemmon	Mount Lemmon Survey	·	1.7 km	MPC · JPL
670060	2013 EY_{177}	—	March 5, 2013	Mount Lemmon	Mount Lemmon Survey	·	1.9 km	MPC · JPL
670061	2013 FO	—	March 22, 2009	Mount Lemmon	Mount Lemmon Survey	·	970 m	MPC · JPL
670062	2013 FW_{2}	—	January 6, 2002	Kitt Peak	Spacewatch	·	2.3 km	MPC · JPL
670063	2013 FX_{2}	—	May 5, 2008	Mount Lemmon	Mount Lemmon Survey	LIX	2.6 km	MPC · JPL
670064	2013 FG_{10}	—	March 11, 2013	Mount Lemmon	Mount Lemmon Survey	NYS	890 m	MPC · JPL
670065	2013 FM_{10}	—	May 25, 2003	Nogales	P. R. Holvorcem, M. Schwartz	·	720 m	MPC · JPL
670066	2013 FS_{10}	—	February 17, 2004	Kitt Peak	Spacewatch	EUN	1.3 km	MPC · JPL
670067	2013 FC_{12}	—	September 30, 2005	Mauna Kea	A. Boattini	·	740 m	MPC · JPL
670068	2013 FS_{12}	—	March 20, 2013	Elena Remote	Oreshko, A.	H	400 m	MPC · JPL
670069	2013 FH_{13}	—	March 15, 2013	Catalina	CSS	·	700 m	MPC · JPL
670070	2013 FH_{15}	—	August 22, 2009	Dauban	C. Rinner, Kugel, F.	·	3.9 km	MPC · JPL
670071	2013 FL_{17}	—	March 19, 2013	Haleakala	Pan-STARRS 1	EUN	870 m	MPC · JPL
670072	2013 FF_{18}	—	October 12, 2004	Kitt Peak	Spacewatch	·	2.4 km	MPC · JPL
670073	2013 FR_{18}	—	March 19, 2013	Haleakala	Pan-STARRS 1	·	2.4 km	MPC · JPL
670074	2013 FQ_{19}	—	March 12, 2013	Mount Lemmon	Mount Lemmon Survey	EUP	3.0 km	MPC · JPL
670075	2013 FO_{20}	—	March 5, 2013	Haleakala	Pan-STARRS 1	H	370 m	MPC · JPL
670076	2013 FK_{30}	—	February 17, 2007	Mount Lemmon	Mount Lemmon Survey	·	2.5 km	MPC · JPL
670077	2013 FB_{32}	—	March 19, 2013	Haleakala	Pan-STARRS 1	·	2.0 km	MPC · JPL
670078	2013 FW_{32}	—	March 31, 2013	Mount Lemmon	Mount Lemmon Survey	·	2.6 km	MPC · JPL
670079	2013 FO_{33}	—	March 19, 2013	Haleakala	Pan-STARRS 1	·	2.4 km	MPC · JPL
670080	2013 FR_{33}	—	March 16, 2013	Kitt Peak	Spacewatch	·	1.1 km	MPC · JPL
670081	2013 FU_{34}	—	March 17, 2013	Mount Lemmon	Mount Lemmon Survey	THM	1.6 km	MPC · JPL
670082	2013 FX_{36}	—	October 19, 2011	Kitt Peak	Spacewatch	·	1.0 km	MPC · JPL
670083	2013 FL_{39}	—	March 19, 2013	Haleakala	Pan-STARRS 1	·	2.1 km	MPC · JPL
670084	2013 GH_{1}	—	January 1, 2012	Mount Lemmon	Mount Lemmon Survey	·	1.7 km	MPC · JPL
670085	2013 GJ_{2}	—	April 2, 2013	Kitt Peak	Spacewatch	·	2.2 km	MPC · JPL
670086	2013 GN_{4}	—	March 13, 2013	Mount Lemmon	Mount Lemmon Survey	EUP	2.9 km	MPC · JPL
670087	2013 GQ_{4}	—	March 11, 2004	Needville	J. Dellinger	EUN	1.2 km	MPC · JPL
670088	2013 GA_{7}	—	April 3, 2013	Palomar	Palomar Transient Factory	T_{j} (2.96)	3.0 km	MPC · JPL
670089	2013 GC_{8}	—	March 18, 2009	Kitt Peak	Spacewatch	·	1.2 km	MPC · JPL
670090	2013 GX_{10}	—	April 12, 2002	Kitt Peak	Spacewatch	MAS	570 m	MPC · JPL
670091	2013 GF_{12}	—	March 12, 2013	Palomar	Palomar Transient Factory	·	2.9 km	MPC · JPL
670092	2013 GJ_{12}	—	April 3, 2013	Palomar	Palomar Transient Factory	·	3.1 km	MPC · JPL
670093	2013 GG_{13}	—	March 12, 2013	Mount Lemmon	Mount Lemmon Survey	·	2.9 km	MPC · JPL
670094	2013 GJ_{14}	—	March 31, 2013	Palomar	Palomar Transient Factory	T_{j} (2.99)	3.0 km	MPC · JPL
670095	2013 GN_{17}	—	March 5, 2013	Kitt Peak	Spacewatch	·	990 m	MPC · JPL
670096	2013 GR_{26}	—	February 8, 2007	Mount Lemmon	Mount Lemmon Survey	·	2.7 km	MPC · JPL
670097	2013 GF_{27}	—	April 5, 2013	Haleakala	Pan-STARRS 1	H	420 m	MPC · JPL
670098	2013 GN_{27}	—	February 15, 2013	Haleakala	Pan-STARRS 1	PHO	840 m	MPC · JPL
670099	2013 GJ_{30}	—	August 12, 2010	Kitt Peak	Spacewatch	EOS	1.9 km	MPC · JPL
670100	2013 GH_{31}	—	September 18, 2003	Kitt Peak	Spacewatch	·	2.6 km	MPC · JPL

== 670101–670200 ==
back to top

Designation			Discovery			Properties		Ref
Permanent	Provisional	Named after	Date	Site	Discoverer(s)	Category	Diam.	Ref
670101	2013 GR_{33}	—	March 5, 2013	Haleakala	Pan-STARRS 1	NYS	1.1 km	MPC · JPL
670102	2013 GP_{34}	—	January 1, 2009	Kitt Peak	Spacewatch	·	930 m	MPC · JPL
670103	2013 GG_{40}	—	October 17, 2010	Mount Lemmon	Mount Lemmon Survey	·	2.5 km	MPC · JPL
670104	2013 GX_{40}	—	February 17, 2013	Mount Lemmon	Mount Lemmon Survey	H	380 m	MPC · JPL
670105	2013 GY_{40}	—	April 8, 2013	Oukaïmeden	M. Ory	·	4.2 km	MPC · JPL
670106	2013 GZ_{40}	—	April 8, 2013	Oukaïmeden	M. Ory	PHO	980 m	MPC · JPL
670107	2013 GG_{48}	—	October 11, 2001	Kitt Peak	Spacewatch	·	830 m	MPC · JPL
670108	2013 GM_{49}	—	October 16, 2006	Catalina	CSS	·	2.5 km	MPC · JPL
670109	2013 GP_{50}	—	January 17, 2009	Kitt Peak	Spacewatch	·	1.0 km	MPC · JPL
670110	2013 GQ_{50}	—	April 8, 2013	Palomar	Palomar Transient Factory	TIR	2.4 km	MPC · JPL
670111	2013 GY_{50}	—	April 8, 2013	Mount Lemmon	Mount Lemmon Survey	·	2.4 km	MPC · JPL
670112	2013 GC_{51}	—	March 15, 2013	Kitt Peak	Spacewatch	·	850 m	MPC · JPL
670113	2013 GW_{52}	—	March 18, 2013	Kitt Peak	Spacewatch	NYS	930 m	MPC · JPL
670114	2013 GR_{53}	—	April 10, 2013	Haleakala	Pan-STARRS 1	·	2.2 km	MPC · JPL
670115	2013 GB_{54}	—	March 1, 2009	Kitt Peak	Spacewatch	V	540 m	MPC · JPL
670116	2013 GD_{54}	—	April 10, 2013	Haleakala	Pan-STARRS 1	PHO	900 m	MPC · JPL
670117	2013 GM_{56}	—	March 15, 2013	Mount Lemmon	Mount Lemmon Survey	·	810 m	MPC · JPL
670118	2013 GE_{57}	—	June 21, 2009	Mount Lemmon	Mount Lemmon Survey	·	1.6 km	MPC · JPL
670119	2013 GR_{58}	—	March 31, 2013	Mount Lemmon	Mount Lemmon Survey	·	2.2 km	MPC · JPL
670120	2013 GV_{60}	—	January 2, 2012	Mount Lemmon	Mount Lemmon Survey	·	2.3 km	MPC · JPL
670121	2013 GM_{64}	—	May 31, 2008	Kitt Peak	Spacewatch	·	3.3 km	MPC · JPL
670122	2013 GQ_{66}	—	April 9, 2013	Córdoba	Colazo, C.	T_{j} (2.98)	3.3 km	MPC · JPL
670123	2013 GM_{72}	—	April 11, 2013	ESA OGS	ESA OGS	MAS	640 m	MPC · JPL
670124	2013 GA_{75}	—	April 9, 2002	Palomar	NEAT	H	530 m	MPC · JPL
670125	2013 GL_{75}	—	April 10, 2013	Haleakala	Pan-STARRS 1	·	2.7 km	MPC · JPL
670126	2013 GT_{76}	—	January 17, 2007	Catalina	CSS	·	3.1 km	MPC · JPL
670127	2013 GD_{78}	—	March 30, 2000	Kitt Peak	Spacewatch	·	1.9 km	MPC · JPL
670128	2013 GG_{80}	—	April 13, 2013	Haleakala	Pan-STARRS 1	·	280 m	MPC · JPL
670129	2013 GS_{82}	—	April 10, 2013	Haleakala	Pan-STARRS 1	THM	1.8 km	MPC · JPL
670130	2013 GR_{83}	—	April 14, 2013	Mount Lemmon	Mount Lemmon Survey	·	3.3 km	MPC · JPL
670131	2013 GX_{84}	—	March 9, 2007	Mount Lemmon	Mount Lemmon Survey	·	2.8 km	MPC · JPL
670132	2013 GX_{86}	—	April 14, 2013	Mount Lemmon	Mount Lemmon Survey	·	3.3 km	MPC · JPL
670133	2013 GJ_{87}	—	April 14, 2013	Mount Lemmon	Mount Lemmon Survey	·	1.2 km	MPC · JPL
670134	2013 GM_{94}	—	February 23, 2003	Kitt Peak	Spacewatch	·	820 m	MPC · JPL
670135	2013 GA_{95}	—	April 10, 2005	Kitt Peak	Deep Ecliptic Survey	·	1.1 km	MPC · JPL
670136	2013 GY_{96}	—	October 6, 2004	Kitt Peak	Spacewatch	·	2.9 km	MPC · JPL
670137	2013 GY_{98}	—	April 1, 2002	Palomar	NEAT	·	2.1 km	MPC · JPL
670138	2013 GL_{100}	—	October 10, 2010	Kitt Peak	Spacewatch	·	990 m	MPC · JPL
670139	2013 GX_{103}	—	April 2, 2013	Mount Lemmon	Mount Lemmon Survey	·	770 m	MPC · JPL
670140	2013 GS_{104}	—	March 15, 2013	Kitt Peak	Spacewatch	THB	2.6 km	MPC · JPL
670141	2013 GO_{105}	—	August 18, 2009	Kitt Peak	Spacewatch	EUP	3.8 km	MPC · JPL
670142	2013 GV_{106}	—	April 9, 2002	Kitt Peak	Spacewatch	·	950 m	MPC · JPL
670143	2013 GZ_{107}	—	January 31, 2009	Mount Lemmon	Mount Lemmon Survey	·	1.2 km	MPC · JPL
670144	2013 GJ_{109}	—	April 9, 2013	Haleakala	Pan-STARRS 1	H	490 m	MPC · JPL
670145	2013 GU_{110}	—	April 11, 2013	Catalina	CSS	·	900 m	MPC · JPL
670146	2013 GQ_{111}	—	October 22, 2003	Kitt Peak	Deep Ecliptic Survey	·	840 m	MPC · JPL
670147	2013 GA_{112}	—	April 12, 2013	Haleakala	Pan-STARRS 1	·	1.0 km	MPC · JPL
670148	2013 GT_{112}	—	April 13, 2002	Palomar	NEAT	·	2.5 km	MPC · JPL
670149	2013 GO_{113}	—	October 23, 2011	Haleakala	Pan-STARRS 1	·	1.6 km	MPC · JPL
670150	2013 GF_{114}	—	April 15, 2013	Haleakala	Pan-STARRS 1	·	1.1 km	MPC · JPL
670151	2013 GT_{114}	—	March 18, 2013	Haleakala	Pan-STARRS 1	H	520 m	MPC · JPL
670152	2013 GA_{115}	—	November 20, 2003	Apache Point	SDSS Collaboration	TIR	2.7 km	MPC · JPL
670153	2013 GW_{116}	—	March 19, 2013	Haleakala	Pan-STARRS 1	V	520 m	MPC · JPL
670154	2013 GR_{117}	—	March 24, 2013	Mount Lemmon	Mount Lemmon Survey	·	2.0 km	MPC · JPL
670155	2013 GW_{128}	—	April 5, 2013	Palomar	Palomar Transient Factory	·	2.4 km	MPC · JPL
670156	2013 GV_{129}	—	January 19, 2013	Kitt Peak	Spacewatch	·	3.7 km	MPC · JPL
670157	2013 GY_{130}	—	January 8, 2002	Palomar	NEAT	·	960 m	MPC · JPL
670158	2013 GC_{132}	—	April 18, 2013	Palomar	Palomar Transient Factory	·	1.4 km	MPC · JPL
670159	2013 GR_{135}	—	April 13, 2013	ESA OGS	ESA OGS	·	3.0 km	MPC · JPL
670160	2013 GR_{138}	—	January 27, 2012	Mount Lemmon	Mount Lemmon Survey	·	2.5 km	MPC · JPL
670161	2013 GH_{142}	—	April 7, 2013	Mount Lemmon	Mount Lemmon Survey	·	2.2 km	MPC · JPL
670162	2013 GJ_{142}	—	October 7, 2016	Haleakala	Pan-STARRS 1	VER	2.0 km	MPC · JPL
670163	2013 GS_{142}	—	April 2, 2013	Mount Lemmon	Mount Lemmon Survey	·	2.9 km	MPC · JPL
670164	2013 GV_{142}	—	November 27, 2000	Apache Point	SDSS Collaboration	T_{j} (2.97)	2.5 km	MPC · JPL
670165	2013 GS_{143}	—	April 13, 2013	ESA OGS	ESA OGS	·	2.7 km	MPC · JPL
670166	2013 GV_{143}	—	April 10, 2013	Haleakala	Pan-STARRS 1	(31811)	2.3 km	MPC · JPL
670167	2013 GZ_{144}	—	April 11, 2013	Kitt Peak	Spacewatch	·	1.1 km	MPC · JPL
670168	2013 GA_{147}	—	April 10, 2013	Mount Lemmon	Mount Lemmon Survey	·	2.1 km	MPC · JPL
670169	2013 GG_{147}	—	January 17, 2007	Kitt Peak	Spacewatch	LIX	2.9 km	MPC · JPL
670170	2013 GR_{147}	—	December 23, 2017	Haleakala	Pan-STARRS 1	LIX	2.9 km	MPC · JPL
670171	2013 GD_{148}	—	October 5, 2015	Haleakala	Pan-STARRS 1	·	2.9 km	MPC · JPL
670172	2013 GH_{148}	—	June 27, 2014	Haleakala	Pan-STARRS 1	LIX	2.9 km	MPC · JPL
670173	2013 GM_{152}	—	April 13, 2013	Haleakala	Pan-STARRS 1	·	3.0 km	MPC · JPL
670174	2013 GT_{152}	—	April 13, 2013	Haleakala	Pan-STARRS 1	·	780 m	MPC · JPL
670175	2013 GH_{154}	—	April 6, 2013	Mount Lemmon	Mount Lemmon Survey	THM	1.9 km	MPC · JPL
670176	2013 GX_{156}	—	April 10, 2013	Haleakala	Pan-STARRS 1	·	1.0 km	MPC · JPL
670177	2013 GY_{167}	—	November 12, 2005	Kitt Peak	Spacewatch	·	1.9 km	MPC · JPL
670178	2013 HD	—	January 9, 2013	Mount Lemmon	Mount Lemmon Survey	H	470 m	MPC · JPL
670179	2013 HD_{2}	—	April 10, 2013	Mount Lemmon	Mount Lemmon Survey	·	2.9 km	MPC · JPL
670180	2013 HO_{2}	—	December 30, 2008	Mount Lemmon	Mount Lemmon Survey	·	1.0 km	MPC · JPL
670181	2013 HY_{2}	—	March 25, 2007	7300	W. K. Y. Yeung	·	3.1 km	MPC · JPL
670182	2013 HB_{3}	—	December 13, 2010	Mount Lemmon	Mount Lemmon Survey	·	3.1 km	MPC · JPL
670183	2013 HN_{3}	—	November 14, 2010	Kitt Peak	Spacewatch	·	2.7 km	MPC · JPL
670184	2013 HH_{4}	—	March 7, 2013	Mayhill-ISON	L. Elenin	·	2.0 km	MPC · JPL
670185	2013 HZ_{5}	—	April 18, 2013	Mount Lemmon	Mount Lemmon Survey	·	2.6 km	MPC · JPL
670186	2013 HJ_{6}	—	May 10, 2002	Palomar	NEAT	TIR	2.9 km	MPC · JPL
670187	2013 HM_{6}	—	October 17, 2010	Mount Lemmon	Mount Lemmon Survey	·	2.9 km	MPC · JPL
670188	2013 HS_{6}	—	August 16, 2009	Kitt Peak	Spacewatch	·	2.9 km	MPC · JPL
670189	2013 HT_{6}	—	June 14, 2002	Palomar	NEAT	LIX	3.1 km	MPC · JPL
670190	2013 HA_{9}	—	January 7, 2006	Kitt Peak	Spacewatch	·	830 m	MPC · JPL
670191	2013 HR_{10}	—	April 20, 2013	Mount Lemmon	Mount Lemmon Survey	THB	2.9 km	MPC · JPL
670192	2013 HE_{11}	—	April 20, 2013	Palomar	Palomar Transient Factory	H	480 m	MPC · JPL
670193	2013 HV_{11}	—	April 13, 2008	Mount Lemmon	Mount Lemmon Survey	H	380 m	MPC · JPL
670194	2013 HV_{16}	—	October 19, 2003	Apache Point	SDSS Collaboration	·	1.0 km	MPC · JPL
670195	2013 HF_{20}	—	February 13, 2004	Kitt Peak	Spacewatch	·	1.6 km	MPC · JPL
670196	2013 HV_{23}	—	April 28, 2013	Siding Spring	SSS	·	1.3 km	MPC · JPL
670197	2013 HC_{24}	—	September 21, 2003	Kitt Peak	Spacewatch	·	3.0 km	MPC · JPL
670198	2013 HB_{25}	—	October 24, 2005	Kitt Peak	Spacewatch	·	1.8 km	MPC · JPL
670199	2013 HM_{27}	—	March 15, 2013	Kitt Peak	Spacewatch	MAS	630 m	MPC · JPL
670200	2013 HK_{30}	—	October 17, 2010	Mount Lemmon	Mount Lemmon Survey	·	1.7 km	MPC · JPL

== 670201–670300 ==
back to top

Designation			Discovery			Properties		Ref
Permanent	Provisional	Named after	Date	Site	Discoverer(s)	Category	Diam.	Ref
670201	2013 HJ_{34}	—	January 17, 2009	Mount Lemmon	Mount Lemmon Survey	·	920 m	MPC · JPL
670202	2013 HR_{35}	—	September 10, 2009	ESA OGS	ESA OGS	·	2.9 km	MPC · JPL
670203	2013 HD_{42}	—	September 20, 2003	Kitt Peak	Spacewatch	HYG	2.4 km	MPC · JPL
670204	2013 HY_{43}	—	February 25, 2007	Mount Lemmon	Mount Lemmon Survey	·	3.0 km	MPC · JPL
670205	2013 HM_{50}	—	September 24, 2004	Kitt Peak	Spacewatch	·	2.3 km	MPC · JPL
670206	2013 HL_{52}	—	April 9, 2013	Haleakala	Pan-STARRS 1	·	2.1 km	MPC · JPL
670207	2013 HZ_{65}	—	April 16, 2013	Cerro Tololo-DECam	DECam	·	1.3 km	MPC · JPL
670208	2013 HD_{67}	—	October 3, 2003	Kitt Peak	Spacewatch	·	880 m	MPC · JPL
670209	2013 HL_{73}	—	January 14, 2002	Kitt Peak	Spacewatch	·	630 m	MPC · JPL
670210	2013 HX_{77}	—	November 2, 2010	Mount Lemmon	Mount Lemmon Survey	·	2.3 km	MPC · JPL
670211	2013 HG_{84}	—	October 12, 1999	Socorro	LINEAR	·	2.1 km	MPC · JPL
670212	2013 HV_{84}	—	April 9, 2013	Haleakala	Pan-STARRS 1	·	2.3 km	MPC · JPL
670213	2013 HJ_{87}	—	October 23, 2003	Kitt Peak	Spacewatch	·	1.1 km	MPC · JPL
670214	2013 HL_{87}	—	March 16, 2007	Mount Lemmon	Mount Lemmon Survey	THM	1.7 km	MPC · JPL
670215	2013 HR_{89}	—	March 17, 2013	Kitt Peak	Spacewatch	·	900 m	MPC · JPL
670216	2013 HD_{91}	—	April 10, 2013	Haleakala	Pan-STARRS 1	MAS	410 m	MPC · JPL
670217	2013 HK_{92}	—	September 15, 2009	Kitt Peak	Spacewatch	·	2.1 km	MPC · JPL
670218	2013 HF_{93}	—	May 1, 2013	Mount Lemmon	Mount Lemmon Survey	·	2.2 km	MPC · JPL
670219	2013 HG_{94}	—	May 15, 2008	Kitt Peak	Spacewatch	·	2.3 km	MPC · JPL
670220	2013 HC_{102}	—	April 16, 2013	Cerro Tololo-DECam	DECam	·	2.0 km	MPC · JPL
670221	2013 HN_{103}	—	April 12, 2002	Kitt Peak	Spacewatch	NYS	850 m	MPC · JPL
670222	2013 HO_{103}	—	November 1, 2010	Mount Lemmon	Mount Lemmon Survey	·	2.0 km	MPC · JPL
670223	2013 HE_{104}	—	April 2, 2013	Mount Lemmon	Mount Lemmon Survey	·	2.3 km	MPC · JPL
670224	2013 HK_{104}	—	September 14, 1999	Kitt Peak	Spacewatch	NYS	920 m	MPC · JPL
670225	2013 HJ_{108}	—	April 10, 2013	Haleakala	Pan-STARRS 1	THM	1.8 km	MPC · JPL
670226	2013 HV_{109}	—	April 10, 2013	Haleakala	Pan-STARRS 1	·	2.1 km	MPC · JPL
670227	2013 HX_{111}	—	April 10, 2013	Haleakala	Pan-STARRS 1	·	830 m	MPC · JPL
670228	2013 HL_{116}	—	April 15, 2013	Calvin-Rehoboth	L. A. Molnar	·	990 m	MPC · JPL
670229	2013 HE_{118}	—	March 15, 2013	Kitt Peak	Spacewatch	·	2.2 km	MPC · JPL
670230	2013 HM_{119}	—	September 29, 2005	Kitt Peak	Spacewatch	·	2.3 km	MPC · JPL
670231	2013 HS_{119}	—	February 13, 2013	ESA OGS	ESA OGS	·	2.3 km	MPC · JPL
670232	2013 HC_{120}	—	May 5, 2008	Mount Lemmon	Mount Lemmon Survey	·	2.9 km	MPC · JPL
670233	2013 HJ_{120}	—	April 10, 2013	Haleakala	Pan-STARRS 1	NYS	1.0 km	MPC · JPL
670234	2013 HQ_{120}	—	April 10, 2013	Haleakala	Pan-STARRS 1	·	2.1 km	MPC · JPL
670235	2013 HQ_{122}	—	January 4, 2012	Mount Lemmon	Mount Lemmon Survey	THM	1.4 km	MPC · JPL
670236	2013 HR_{123}	—	April 17, 2013	Cerro Tololo-DECam	DECam	·	2.9 km	MPC · JPL
670237	2013 HN_{124}	—	September 4, 2010	Mount Lemmon	Mount Lemmon Survey	·	1.5 km	MPC · JPL
670238	2013 HC_{127}	—	April 11, 2013	ESA OGS	ESA OGS	·	1.1 km	MPC · JPL
670239	2013 HW_{127}	—	April 17, 2013	Cerro Tololo-DECam	DECam	·	1.0 km	MPC · JPL
670240	2013 HQ_{144}	—	April 9, 2013	Haleakala	Pan-STARRS 1	·	2.9 km	MPC · JPL
670241	2013 HW_{154}	—	November 1, 2010	Mount Lemmon	Mount Lemmon Survey	VER	2.3 km	MPC · JPL
670242	2013 HW_{158}	—	October 20, 2016	Mount Lemmon	Mount Lemmon Survey	EUP	2.9 km	MPC · JPL
670243	2013 JB	—	April 11, 2013	ESA OGS	ESA OGS	EOS	2.3 km	MPC · JPL
670244	2013 JD	—	May 1, 2013	Palomar	Palomar Transient Factory	T_{j} (2.99) · EUP	2.5 km	MPC · JPL
670245	2013 JG	—	November 1, 2011	Mount Lemmon	Mount Lemmon Survey	T_{j} (2.98) · EUP	2.7 km	MPC · JPL
670246	2013 JE_{1}	—	May 1, 2013	Palomar	Palomar Transient Factory	APO	500 m	MPC · JPL
670247	2013 JJ_{1}	—	May 1, 2013	Kitt Peak	Spacewatch	·	1.2 km	MPC · JPL
670248	2013 JY_{1}	—	April 18, 2013	Mount Lemmon	Mount Lemmon Survey	·	2.6 km	MPC · JPL
670249	2013 JP_{3}	—	April 16, 2013	Siding Spring	SSS	·	3.3 km	MPC · JPL
670250	2013 JH_{4}	—	May 4, 2013	Palomar	Palomar Transient Factory	·	1.0 km	MPC · JPL
670251	2013 JX_{4}	—	October 30, 2005	Kitt Peak	Spacewatch	·	2.6 km	MPC · JPL
670252	2013 JM_{6}	—	April 12, 2013	Haleakala	Pan-STARRS 1	LIX	3.0 km	MPC · JPL
670253	2013 JR_{6}	—	May 6, 2013	Elena Remote	Oreshko, A.	ELF	3.3 km	MPC · JPL
670254	2013 JT_{8}	—	October 10, 2004	Kitt Peak	Deep Ecliptic Survey	·	2.9 km	MPC · JPL
670255	2013 JA_{9}	—	April 13, 2013	Haleakala	Pan-STARRS 1	·	1.2 km	MPC · JPL
670256	2013 JY_{14}	—	February 16, 2002	Palomar	NEAT	·	2.9 km	MPC · JPL
670257	2013 JN_{18}	—	February 25, 2007	Kitt Peak	Spacewatch	·	2.2 km	MPC · JPL
670258	2013 JT_{19}	—	September 17, 2003	Kitt Peak	Spacewatch	·	3.1 km	MPC · JPL
670259	2013 JN_{23}	—	September 27, 2003	Apache Point	SDSS Collaboration	·	3.3 km	MPC · JPL
670260	2013 JE_{27}	—	April 7, 2013	Kitt Peak	Spacewatch	EUP	2.6 km	MPC · JPL
670261	2013 JT_{29}	—	April 1, 2009	Kitt Peak	Spacewatch	·	1.1 km	MPC · JPL
670262	2013 JU_{29}	—	September 26, 2003	Apache Point	SDSS Collaboration	·	2.2 km	MPC · JPL
670263	2013 JB_{30}	—	April 20, 2013	Palomar	Palomar Transient Factory	PHO	1.0 km	MPC · JPL
670264	2013 JZ_{32}	—	January 25, 2012	Haleakala	Pan-STARRS 1	EUP	2.9 km	MPC · JPL
670265	2013 JG_{33}	—	April 15, 2013	Haleakala	Pan-STARRS 1	·	2.8 km	MPC · JPL
670266	2013 JU_{39}	—	May 12, 2013	Kitt Peak	Spacewatch	T_{j} (2.98) · EUP	3.3 km	MPC · JPL
670267	2013 JB_{41}	—	September 4, 2003	Kitt Peak	Spacewatch	THM	2.4 km	MPC · JPL
670268	2013 JX_{42}	—	September 27, 2003	Apache Point	SDSS Collaboration	·	2.5 km	MPC · JPL
670269	2013 JG_{44}	—	April 10, 2013	Haleakala	Pan-STARRS 1	·	1.1 km	MPC · JPL
670270	2013 JK_{45}	—	April 22, 2013	Mount Lemmon	Mount Lemmon Survey	·	3.1 km	MPC · JPL
670271	2013 JR_{46}	—	February 7, 2011	Mount Lemmon	Mount Lemmon Survey	·	2.7 km	MPC · JPL
670272	2013 JV_{47}	—	May 12, 2013	Haleakala	Pan-STARRS 1	·	3.0 km	MPC · JPL
670273	2013 JP_{50}	—	May 1, 2013	Mount Lemmon	Mount Lemmon Survey	·	940 m	MPC · JPL
670274	2013 JN_{59}	—	October 20, 2007	Mount Lemmon	Mount Lemmon Survey	·	650 m	MPC · JPL
670275	2013 JS_{61}	—	May 8, 2013	Haleakala	Pan-STARRS 1	·	4.0 km	MPC · JPL
670276	2013 JT_{67}	—	May 9, 2013	Haleakala	Pan-STARRS 1	·	2.8 km	MPC · JPL
670277	2013 JN_{71}	—	April 16, 2017	Haleakala	Pan-STARRS 1	WIT	720 m	MPC · JPL
670278	2013 JF_{74}	—	September 14, 2014	Haleakala	Pan-STARRS 1	·	1.5 km	MPC · JPL
670279	2013 JU_{78}	—	May 15, 2013	Haleakala	Pan-STARRS 1	·	1.2 km	MPC · JPL
670280	2013 JN_{79}	—	May 8, 2013	Haleakala	Pan-STARRS 1	·	1.0 km	MPC · JPL
670281	2013 KZ_{6}	—	April 16, 2013	Haleakala	Pan-STARRS 1	·	3.3 km	MPC · JPL
670282	2013 KK_{8}	—	December 27, 2011	Mount Lemmon	Mount Lemmon Survey	·	2.8 km	MPC · JPL
670283	2013 KJ_{12}	—	October 18, 2003	Apache Point	SDSS Collaboration	·	760 m	MPC · JPL
670284	2013 KS_{12}	—	March 28, 2009	Kitt Peak	Spacewatch	·	980 m	MPC · JPL
670285	2013 KW_{13}	—	April 7, 2006	Kitt Peak	Spacewatch	·	750 m	MPC · JPL
670286	2013 KX_{16}	—	October 13, 2009	Bergisch Gladbach	W. Bickel	·	3.4 km	MPC · JPL
670287	2013 KX_{17}	—	May 16, 2013	Mount Lemmon	Mount Lemmon Survey	·	680 m	MPC · JPL
670288	2013 LU	—	April 22, 2007	Pises	Pises	·	3.1 km	MPC · JPL
670289	2013 LN_{2}	—	April 15, 2013	Haleakala	Pan-STARRS 1	·	860 m	MPC · JPL
670290	2013 LF_{4}	—	November 15, 2011	Mount Lemmon	Mount Lemmon Survey	·	1.2 km	MPC · JPL
670291	2013 LH_{9}	—	February 3, 2012	Oukaïmeden	C. Rinner	·	3.4 km	MPC · JPL
670292	2013 LY_{11}	—	May 24, 2006	Palomar	NEAT	·	1 km	MPC · JPL
670293	2013 LG_{13}	—	April 18, 2007	Kitt Peak	Spacewatch	·	2.5 km	MPC · JPL
670294	2013 LS_{15}	—	June 7, 2013	Nogales	M. Schwartz, P. R. Holvorcem	T_{j} (2.99)	2.9 km	MPC · JPL
670295	2013 LH_{16}	—	June 7, 2013	Haleakala	Pan-STARRS 1	T_{j} (2.68) · APO	590 m	MPC · JPL
670296	2013 LQ_{18}	—	November 14, 2010	Mount Lemmon	Mount Lemmon Survey	·	2.5 km	MPC · JPL
670297	2013 LZ_{21}	—	November 6, 2010	Mount Lemmon	Mount Lemmon Survey	·	2.8 km	MPC · JPL
670298	2013 LV_{23}	—	September 18, 2003	Kitt Peak	Spacewatch	·	3.0 km	MPC · JPL
670299	2013 LM_{29}	—	December 5, 2005	Kitt Peak	Spacewatch	·	1.4 km	MPC · JPL
670300	2013 LZ_{31}	—	August 8, 2008	Siding Spring	SSS	·	3.2 km	MPC · JPL

== 670301–670400 ==
back to top

Designation			Discovery			Properties		Ref
Permanent	Provisional	Named after	Date	Site	Discoverer(s)	Category	Diam.	Ref
670301	2013 LA_{33}	—	October 24, 2003	Apache Point	SDSS Collaboration	·	2.0 km	MPC · JPL
670302	2013 LR_{35}	—	August 1, 2001	Palomar	NEAT	·	1.1 km	MPC · JPL
670303	2013 LM_{37}	—	June 7, 2013	Haleakala	Pan-STARRS 1	·	970 m	MPC · JPL
670304	2013 LW_{40}	—	June 12, 2013	Haleakala	Pan-STARRS 1	AGN	910 m	MPC · JPL
670305	2013 LG_{41}	—	June 1, 2013	Mount Lemmon	Mount Lemmon Survey	·	1.2 km	MPC · JPL
670306	2013 MZ_{3}	—	June 18, 2013	Mount Lemmon	Mount Lemmon Survey	EUN	1.2 km	MPC · JPL
670307	2013 MF_{4}	—	February 6, 2007	Mount Lemmon	Mount Lemmon Survey	·	1.4 km	MPC · JPL
670308	2013 MM_{11}	—	June 30, 2013	Haleakala	Pan-STARRS 1	(194)	1.6 km	MPC · JPL
670309	2013 MZ_{15}	—	October 9, 2015	Haleakala	Pan-STARRS 1	THB	2.8 km	MPC · JPL
670310	2013 MX_{17}	—	June 20, 2013	Haleakala	Pan-STARRS 1	HNS	1.1 km	MPC · JPL
670311	2013 ML_{18}	—	June 18, 2013	Mount Lemmon	Mount Lemmon Survey	·	1.2 km	MPC · JPL
670312	2013 MG_{19}	—	June 18, 2013	Haleakala	Pan-STARRS 1	·	970 m	MPC · JPL
670313	2013 MQ_{20}	—	August 26, 2009	Catalina	CSS	·	1.2 km	MPC · JPL
670314	2013 MA_{23}	—	June 20, 2013	Haleakala	Pan-STARRS 1	·	1.0 km	MPC · JPL
670315	2013 NZ_{5}	—	September 4, 2008	Kitt Peak	Spacewatch	·	3.3 km	MPC · JPL
670316	2013 NN_{14}	—	September 6, 2008	Catalina	CSS	·	2.2 km	MPC · JPL
670317	2013 NZ_{14}	—	November 18, 2003	Palomar	NEAT	H	500 m	MPC · JPL
670318	2013 NO_{16}	—	October 1, 2008	Kitt Peak	Spacewatch	·	3.2 km	MPC · JPL
670319	2013 NN_{17}	—	October 22, 2008	Kitt Peak	Spacewatch	·	3.7 km	MPC · JPL
670320	2013 NL_{27}	—	July 1, 2013	Haleakala	Pan-STARRS 1	V	690 m	MPC · JPL
670321	2013 NT_{33}	—	July 7, 2013	Haleakala	Pan-STARRS 1	centaur	100 km	MPC · JPL
670322	2013 NB_{36}	—	July 2, 2013	Haleakala	Pan-STARRS 1	·	1.3 km	MPC · JPL
670323	2013 NR_{39}	—	October 21, 2014	Catalina	CSS	·	970 m	MPC · JPL
670324	2013 NS_{39}	—	December 13, 2015	Haleakala	Pan-STARRS 1	T_{j} (2.96)	3.4 km	MPC · JPL
670325	2013 NX_{40}	—	July 13, 2013	Haleakala	Pan-STARRS 1	(21344)	1.4 km	MPC · JPL
670326	2013 NO_{46}	—	July 1, 2013	Haleakala	Pan-STARRS 1	HNS	880 m	MPC · JPL
670327	2013 NO_{48}	—	October 30, 2005	Kitt Peak	Spacewatch	(5)	950 m	MPC · JPL
670328	2013 NR_{58}	—	July 9, 2013	Haleakala	Pan-STARRS 1	EUN	940 m	MPC · JPL
670329	2013 NT_{59}	—	July 9, 2013	Haleakala	Pan-STARRS 1	·	1.0 km	MPC · JPL
670330	2013 NU_{62}	—	July 14, 2013	Haleakala	Pan-STARRS 1	·	860 m	MPC · JPL
670331	2013 NE_{64}	—	July 2, 2013	Haleakala	Pan-STARRS 1	ADE	1.6 km	MPC · JPL
670332	2013 NG_{66}	—	July 12, 2013	Haleakala	Pan-STARRS 1	MAR	840 m	MPC · JPL
670333	2013 NA_{67}	—	July 15, 2013	Haleakala	Pan-STARRS 1	·	1.3 km	MPC · JPL
670334	2013 NO_{71}	—	July 13, 2013	Haleakala	Pan-STARRS 1	·	1.0 km	MPC · JPL
670335	2013 OK_{8}	—	May 18, 2002	Palomar	NEAT	·	3.8 km	MPC · JPL
670336	2013 OW_{11}	—	July 28, 2013	Kitt Peak	Spacewatch	·	2.0 km	MPC · JPL
670337	2013 OQ_{12}	—	November 3, 2005	Kitt Peak	Spacewatch	·	1.2 km	MPC · JPL
670338	2013 OL_{13}	—	July 16, 2013	Haleakala	Pan-STARRS 1	·	1.0 km	MPC · JPL
670339	2013 OM_{13}	—	January 20, 2015	Mount Lemmon	Mount Lemmon Survey	·	1.9 km	MPC · JPL
670340	2013 OL_{14}	—	October 24, 2014	Mount Lemmon	Mount Lemmon Survey	HNS	1.3 km	MPC · JPL
670341	2013 OO_{17}	—	July 16, 2013	Haleakala	Pan-STARRS 1	·	1.1 km	MPC · JPL
670342	2013 PN_{3}	—	October 19, 2003	Apache Point	SDSS Collaboration	·	2.5 km	MPC · JPL
670343	2013 PU_{3}	—	August 1, 2013	Haleakala	Pan-STARRS 1	·	1.3 km	MPC · JPL
670344	2013 PG_{4}	—	September 21, 2009	Catalina	CSS	·	1.1 km	MPC · JPL
670345	2013 PX_{7}	—	August 1, 2013	Palomar	Palomar Transient Factory	·	1.6 km	MPC · JPL
670346	2013 PY_{9}	—	August 3, 2013	Haleakala	Pan-STARRS 1	·	1.8 km	MPC · JPL
670347	2013 PZ_{9}	—	August 3, 2013	Haleakala	Pan-STARRS 1	·	1.3 km	MPC · JPL
670348	2013 PW_{11}	—	August 5, 2013	Palomar	Palomar Transient Factory	V	690 m	MPC · JPL
670349	2013 PH_{14}	—	July 29, 2002	Palomar	NEAT	TIR	2.7 km	MPC · JPL
670350	2013 PC_{16}	—	August 7, 2013	Palomar	Palomar Transient Factory	THB	3.1 km	MPC · JPL
670351	2013 PE_{18}	—	December 16, 2006	Mount Lemmon	Mount Lemmon Survey	·	1.0 km	MPC · JPL
670352	2013 PV_{18}	—	July 15, 2013	Haleakala	Pan-STARRS 1	·	1.2 km	MPC · JPL
670353	2013 PY_{18}	—	July 15, 2013	Haleakala	Pan-STARRS 1	·	1.9 km	MPC · JPL
670354	2013 PU_{21}	—	August 7, 2013	Haleakala	Pan-STARRS 1	·	1.2 km	MPC · JPL
670355	2013 PA_{23}	—	August 8, 2013	Haleakala	Pan-STARRS 1	·	1.5 km	MPC · JPL
670356	2013 PU_{24}	—	October 16, 2003	Kitt Peak	Spacewatch	·	470 m	MPC · JPL
670357	2013 PD_{32}	—	September 14, 2009	Kitt Peak	Spacewatch	·	1.3 km	MPC · JPL
670358	2013 PL_{32}	—	September 18, 2003	Kitt Peak	Spacewatch	·	1.0 km	MPC · JPL
670359	2013 PP_{34}	—	December 19, 2009	Mount Lemmon	Mount Lemmon Survey	·	3.7 km	MPC · JPL
670360	2013 PG_{48}	—	January 15, 2004	Kitt Peak	Spacewatch	·	1.0 km	MPC · JPL
670361	2013 PB_{52}	—	August 13, 2013	Kitt Peak	Spacewatch	·	1.4 km	MPC · JPL
670362	2013 PO_{52}	—	June 18, 2007	Kitt Peak	Spacewatch	·	3.4 km	MPC · JPL
670363	2013 PO_{57}	—	August 15, 2013	Haleakala	Pan-STARRS 1	·	1.3 km	MPC · JPL
670364	2013 PQ_{61}	—	September 16, 2009	Mount Lemmon	Mount Lemmon Survey	·	1.3 km	MPC · JPL
670365	2013 PB_{68}	—	August 12, 2013	Haleakala	Pan-STARRS 1	HNS	880 m	MPC · JPL
670366	2013 PC_{69}	—	November 2, 2008	Mount Lemmon	Mount Lemmon Survey	·	3.1 km	MPC · JPL
670367	2013 PR_{72}	—	July 30, 2013	Kitt Peak	Spacewatch	·	1.4 km	MPC · JPL
670368	2013 PW_{73}	—	December 18, 2003	Kitt Peak	Spacewatch	H	530 m	MPC · JPL
670369	2013 PQ_{75}	—	August 8, 2013	Haleakala	Pan-STARRS 1	·	550 m	MPC · JPL
670370	2013 PU_{76}	—	March 10, 2007	Mount Lemmon	Mount Lemmon Survey	·	1.5 km	MPC · JPL
670371	2013 PH_{78}	—	April 15, 2012	Haleakala	Pan-STARRS 1	·	790 m	MPC · JPL
670372	2013 PT_{81}	—	January 30, 2011	Mount Lemmon	Mount Lemmon Survey	·	1.7 km	MPC · JPL
670373	2013 PH_{83}	—	August 15, 2013	Haleakala	Pan-STARRS 1	·	1.5 km	MPC · JPL
670374	2013 PM_{84}	—	November 27, 2014	Mount Lemmon	Mount Lemmon Survey	·	1.2 km	MPC · JPL
670375	2013 PW_{84}	—	September 30, 2000	Socorro	LINEAR	·	1.5 km	MPC · JPL
670376	2013 PR_{85}	—	August 9, 2013	Haleakala	Pan-STARRS 1	NYS	900 m	MPC · JPL
670377	2013 PN_{96}	—	August 12, 2013	Haleakala	Pan-STARRS 1	·	1.2 km	MPC · JPL
670378	2013 PW_{117}	—	August 9, 2013	Haleakala	Pan-STARRS 1	·	1.2 km	MPC · JPL
670379	2013 PL_{118}	—	August 14, 2013	Haleakala	Pan-STARRS 1	·	1.1 km	MPC · JPL
670380	2013 QP_{3}	—	August 10, 2013	Kitt Peak	Spacewatch	·	2.4 km	MPC · JPL
670381	2013 QN_{7}	—	August 26, 2013	Haleakala	Pan-STARRS 1	EUN	840 m	MPC · JPL
670382	2013 QU_{11}	—	August 26, 2013	Haleakala	Pan-STARRS 1	·	800 m	MPC · JPL
670383	2013 QD_{12}	—	August 9, 2013	Haleakala	Pan-STARRS 1	NYS	950 m	MPC · JPL
670384	2013 QT_{20}	—	September 24, 2000	Socorro	LINEAR	·	1.6 km	MPC · JPL
670385	2013 QK_{25}	—	August 26, 2013	Haleakala	Pan-STARRS 1	SYL	3.3 km	MPC · JPL
670386	2013 QJ_{27}	—	August 5, 2013	ESA OGS	ESA OGS	·	1.2 km	MPC · JPL
670387	2013 QR_{32}	—	August 26, 2013	Haleakala	Pan-STARRS 1	·	1.7 km	MPC · JPL
670388	2013 QH_{33}	—	June 13, 2001	Anderson Mesa	LONEOS	·	3.5 km	MPC · JPL
670389	2013 QW_{34}	—	August 9, 2013	Catalina	CSS	·	1.4 km	MPC · JPL
670390	2013 QR_{44}	—	September 10, 2004	Socorro	LINEAR	·	1.6 km	MPC · JPL
670391	2013 QQ_{47}	—	August 28, 2013	Catalina	CSS	·	1.4 km	MPC · JPL
670392	2013 QO_{50}	—	September 16, 2009	Kitt Peak	Spacewatch	·	1.2 km	MPC · JPL
670393	2013 QS_{52}	—	August 12, 2013	Haleakala	Pan-STARRS 1	·	1.2 km	MPC · JPL
670394	2013 QW_{55}	—	October 13, 2010	Mount Lemmon	Mount Lemmon Survey	·	830 m	MPC · JPL
670395	2013 QX_{60}	—	August 26, 2013	Haleakala	Pan-STARRS 1	·	960 m	MPC · JPL
670396	2013 QY_{61}	—	September 13, 2002	Palomar	NEAT	NYS	1.1 km	MPC · JPL
670397	2013 QU_{63}	—	August 21, 2001	Kitt Peak	Spacewatch	·	1.1 km	MPC · JPL
670398	2013 QP_{66}	—	August 12, 2013	Haleakala	Pan-STARRS 1	·	1.7 km	MPC · JPL
670399	2013 QG_{69}	—	September 25, 2005	Catalina	CSS	·	1.4 km	MPC · JPL
670400	2013 QM_{70}	—	August 13, 2013	Haleakala	Pan-STARRS 1	·	2.2 km	MPC · JPL

== 670401–670500 ==
back to top

Designation			Discovery			Properties		Ref
Permanent	Provisional	Named after	Date	Site	Discoverer(s)	Category	Diam.	Ref
670401	2013 QZ_{70}	—	August 12, 2006	Palomar	NEAT	·	730 m	MPC · JPL
670402	2013 QX_{77}	—	August 28, 2013	Mount Lemmon	Mount Lemmon Survey	·	1.0 km	MPC · JPL
670403	2013 QJ_{79}	—	August 10, 2013	Kitt Peak	Spacewatch	HNS	990 m	MPC · JPL
670404	2013 QO_{81}	—	September 15, 2002	Haleakala	NEAT	·	3.0 km	MPC · JPL
670405	2013 QS_{81}	—	August 8, 2013	Kitt Peak	Spacewatch	HYG	2.2 km	MPC · JPL
670406	2013 QV_{83}	—	August 16, 2006	Siding Spring	SSS	·	800 m	MPC · JPL
670407	2013 QC_{89}	—	January 27, 2011	Mount Lemmon	Mount Lemmon Survey	·	1.4 km	MPC · JPL
670408	2013 QW_{93}	—	October 30, 2008	Kitt Peak	Spacewatch	·	2.6 km	MPC · JPL
670409	2013 QX_{93}	—	December 13, 2006	Kitt Peak	Spacewatch	·	1.0 km	MPC · JPL
670410	2013 QF_{94}	—	March 2, 2006	Kitt Peak	Spacewatch	THM	2.1 km	MPC · JPL
670411	2013 QC_{95}	—	August 31, 2013	Haleakala	Pan-STARRS 1	MAR	900 m	MPC · JPL
670412	2013 QM_{96}	—	January 18, 2015	Mount Lemmon	Mount Lemmon Survey	EUN	990 m	MPC · JPL
670413	2013 QD_{98}	—	August 17, 2013	Haleakala	Pan-STARRS 1	·	1.5 km	MPC · JPL
670414	2013 QP_{103}	—	August 27, 2013	Haleakala	Pan-STARRS 1	EUN	1.1 km	MPC · JPL
670415	2013 RH_{18}	—	September 7, 2004	Socorro	LINEAR	·	1.5 km	MPC · JPL
670416	2013 RV_{28}	—	September 4, 2013	Mount Lemmon	Mount Lemmon Survey	·	910 m	MPC · JPL
670417	2013 RM_{31}	—	September 5, 2013	Bergisch Gladbach	W. Bickel	·	1.6 km	MPC · JPL
670418	2013 RR_{32}	—	September 27, 2009	Catalina	CSS	(5)	1.0 km	MPC · JPL
670419	2013 RO_{34}	—	December 16, 2003	Mauna Kea	D. D. Balam	·	2.6 km	MPC · JPL
670420	2013 RB_{38}	—	May 28, 2008	Kitt Peak	Spacewatch	V	630 m	MPC · JPL
670421	2013 RG_{39}	—	August 28, 2009	Kitt Peak	Spacewatch	·	1.2 km	MPC · JPL
670422	2013 RV_{43}	—	September 28, 2003	Kitt Peak	Spacewatch	·	610 m	MPC · JPL
670423	2013 RA_{47}	—	June 3, 2008	Mount Lemmon	Mount Lemmon Survey	·	1.6 km	MPC · JPL
670424	2013 RJ_{48}	—	September 7, 2004	Kitt Peak	Spacewatch	·	1.3 km	MPC · JPL
670425	2013 RJ_{50}	—	October 27, 2009	Mount Lemmon	Mount Lemmon Survey	·	1.4 km	MPC · JPL
670426	2013 RB_{51}	—	April 2, 2006	Mount Lemmon	Mount Lemmon Survey	T_{j} (2.99)	3.1 km	MPC · JPL
670427	2013 RA_{53}	—	September 13, 2002	Palomar	NEAT	·	1.2 km	MPC · JPL
670428	2013 RC_{54}	—	October 11, 2010	Mount Lemmon	Mount Lemmon Survey	·	1.2 km	MPC · JPL
670429	2013 RA_{60}	—	September 10, 2013	Haleakala	Pan-STARRS 1	·	1.4 km	MPC · JPL
670430	2013 RX_{60}	—	June 26, 2013	Mount Lemmon	Mount Lemmon Survey	·	1.9 km	MPC · JPL
670431	2013 RH_{61}	—	May 9, 2012	Siding Spring	SSS	TIR	3.7 km	MPC · JPL
670432	2013 RP_{61}	—	August 5, 2013	Palomar	Palomar Transient Factory	PHO	760 m	MPC · JPL
670433	2013 RJ_{62}	—	September 12, 2013	Mount Lemmon	Mount Lemmon Survey	·	1.3 km	MPC · JPL
670434	2013 RB_{67}	—	December 14, 1996	Kitt Peak	Spacewatch	·	1.2 km	MPC · JPL
670435	2013 RY_{71}	—	November 9, 2009	Mount Lemmon	Mount Lemmon Survey	·	1.2 km	MPC · JPL
670436	2013 RJ_{80}	—	September 5, 2013	Kitt Peak	Spacewatch	·	1.2 km	MPC · JPL
670437	2013 RV_{82}	—	September 13, 2013	Kitt Peak	Spacewatch	·	1.6 km	MPC · JPL
670438	2013 RH_{84}	—	October 27, 2009	Kitt Peak	Spacewatch	(5)	800 m	MPC · JPL
670439	2013 RQ_{89}	—	February 18, 2005	La Silla	A. Boattini	·	810 m	MPC · JPL
670440	2013 RO_{92}	—	October 14, 2009	Mount Lemmon	Mount Lemmon Survey	·	760 m	MPC · JPL
670441	2013 RP_{96}	—	September 28, 2006	Catalina	CSS	V	680 m	MPC · JPL
670442	2013 RS_{96}	—	August 7, 2013	Kitt Peak	Spacewatch	RAF	660 m	MPC · JPL
670443	2013 RV_{96}	—	September 8, 2013	Palomar	Palomar Transient Factory	·	1.3 km	MPC · JPL
670444	2013 RG_{97}	—	September 5, 2007	Catalina	CSS	·	3.7 km	MPC · JPL
670445	2013 RN_{97}	—	September 13, 2013	Palomar	Palomar Transient Factory	·	1.5 km	MPC · JPL
670446	2013 RW_{99}	—	September 14, 2013	Mount Lemmon	Mount Lemmon Survey	·	1.7 km	MPC · JPL
670447	2013 RO_{100}	—	October 9, 2002	Kitt Peak	Spacewatch	·	2.5 km	MPC · JPL
670448	2013 RC_{103}	—	February 25, 2011	Mount Lemmon	Mount Lemmon Survey	·	1.3 km	MPC · JPL
670449	2013 RO_{105}	—	September 9, 2013	Haleakala	Pan-STARRS 1	·	1.6 km	MPC · JPL
670450	2013 RW_{106}	—	September 14, 2013	Haleakala	Pan-STARRS 1	·	1.3 km	MPC · JPL
670451	2013 RR_{107}	—	September 15, 2013	Haleakala	Pan-STARRS 1	·	1.3 km	MPC · JPL
670452	2013 RN_{108}	—	September 15, 2013	Mount Lemmon	Mount Lemmon Survey	EUN	880 m	MPC · JPL
670453	2013 RU_{109}	—	April 9, 2016	Haleakala	Pan-STARRS 1	·	1.5 km	MPC · JPL
670454	2013 RQ_{110}	—	September 15, 2013	Mount Lemmon	Mount Lemmon Survey	·	940 m	MPC · JPL
670455	2013 RF_{111}	—	September 6, 2013	Mount Lemmon	Mount Lemmon Survey	·	1.9 km	MPC · JPL
670456	2013 RH_{113}	—	September 14, 2013	Haleakala	Pan-STARRS 1	·	1.1 km	MPC · JPL
670457	2013 RY_{113}	—	September 10, 2013	Haleakala	Pan-STARRS 1	·	2.1 km	MPC · JPL
670458	2013 RY_{114}	—	September 15, 2013	Mount Lemmon	Mount Lemmon Survey	MAR	840 m	MPC · JPL
670459	2013 RR_{118}	—	September 15, 2013	Kitt Peak	Spacewatch	·	1.5 km	MPC · JPL
670460	2013 RU_{125}	—	February 25, 2015	Haleakala	Pan-STARRS 1	·	830 m	MPC · JPL
670461	2013 RH_{128}	—	September 1, 2013	Catalina	CSS	·	1.9 km	MPC · JPL
670462	2013 RY_{131}	—	September 14, 2013	Haleakala	Pan-STARRS 1	·	2.4 km	MPC · JPL
670463	2013 RM_{134}	—	September 10, 2013	Haleakala	Pan-STARRS 1	·	1.3 km	MPC · JPL
670464	2013 RB_{139}	—	September 15, 2013	Haleakala	Pan-STARRS 1	·	800 m	MPC · JPL
670465	2013 RG_{142}	—	September 14, 2013	Haleakala	Pan-STARRS 1	·	2.6 km	MPC · JPL
670466	2013 RV_{142}	—	September 10, 2013	Haleakala	Pan-STARRS 1	·	1.5 km	MPC · JPL
670467	2013 RW_{143}	—	September 14, 2013	Mount Lemmon	Mount Lemmon Survey	·	1.1 km	MPC · JPL
670468	2013 SN_{1}	—	September 3, 2013	Mount Lemmon	Mount Lemmon Survey	·	3.1 km	MPC · JPL
670469	2013 SS_{7}	—	December 20, 2009	Kitt Peak	Spacewatch	·	1.1 km	MPC · JPL
670470	2013 SM_{18}	—	February 11, 2004	Kitt Peak	Spacewatch	V	750 m	MPC · JPL
670471	2013 SX_{20}	—	September 2, 2013	Catalina	CSS	H	390 m	MPC · JPL
670472	2013 SZ_{20}	—	September 28, 2013	Catalina	CSS	·	700 m	MPC · JPL
670473	2013 SS_{23}	—	September 28, 2013	Cerro Tololo-LCO B	Lister, T.	·	840 m	MPC · JPL
670474	2013 ST_{23}	—	September 30, 2003	Apache Point	SDSS Collaboration	·	2.1 km	MPC · JPL
670475	2013 SP_{26}	—	September 28, 2013	Palomar	Palomar Transient Factory	·	1.5 km	MPC · JPL
670476	2013 SQ_{30}	—	October 15, 2004	Kitt Peak	Spacewatch	·	1.5 km	MPC · JPL
670477	2013 SG_{31}	—	September 1, 2013	Haleakala	Pan-STARRS 1	HNS	960 m	MPC · JPL
670478	2013 SE_{38}	—	September 3, 2013	Kitt Peak	Spacewatch	·	2.5 km	MPC · JPL
670479	2013 SK_{39}	—	September 25, 2013	Mount Lemmon	Mount Lemmon Survey	·	1.2 km	MPC · JPL
670480	2013 SA_{43}	—	May 10, 2005	Mount Lemmon	Mount Lemmon Survey	·	820 m	MPC · JPL
670481	2013 SR_{43}	—	September 10, 2002	Palomar	NEAT	·	3.3 km	MPC · JPL
670482	2013 SC_{44}	—	September 27, 2013	Piszkéstető	K. Sárneczky	526	1.6 km	MPC · JPL
670483	2013 SZ_{46}	—	December 25, 2010	Mount Lemmon	Mount Lemmon Survey	·	1.2 km	MPC · JPL
670484	2013 SF_{52}	—	March 24, 2012	Mayhill-ISON	L. Elenin	H	590 m	MPC · JPL
670485	2013 SW_{52}	—	February 6, 2002	La Silla	Barbieri, C.	·	1.6 km	MPC · JPL
670486	2013 SJ_{54}	—	September 14, 2013	Kitt Peak	Spacewatch	·	1.2 km	MPC · JPL
670487	2013 SL_{54}	—	September 29, 2013	Mount Lemmon	Mount Lemmon Survey	·	1.3 km	MPC · JPL
670488	2013 SU_{56}	—	November 25, 2009	Kitt Peak	Spacewatch	·	1.3 km	MPC · JPL
670489	2013 SX_{56}	—	October 10, 2005	Catalina	CSS	H	370 m	MPC · JPL
670490	2013 SO_{61}	—	September 3, 2013	Haleakala	Pan-STARRS 1	·	3.3 km	MPC · JPL
670491	2013 SZ_{65}	—	September 5, 2013	Kitt Peak	Spacewatch	·	1.6 km	MPC · JPL
670492	2013 SX_{70}	—	September 24, 2013	Mount Lemmon	Mount Lemmon Survey	·	1.6 km	MPC · JPL
670493	2013 SC_{73}	—	September 14, 2013	Haleakala	Pan-STARRS 1	·	1.0 km	MPC · JPL
670494	2013 SQ_{76}	—	September 27, 2013	Haleakala	Pan-STARRS 1	·	1.3 km	MPC · JPL
670495	2013 SR_{78}	—	September 29, 2013	Mount Lemmon	Mount Lemmon Survey	·	1.2 km	MPC · JPL
670496	2013 SW_{80}	—	September 12, 2013	Kitt Peak	Spacewatch	HNS	1.0 km	MPC · JPL
670497	2013 SO_{84}	—	October 30, 2002	Palomar	NEAT	·	1.5 km	MPC · JPL
670498	2013 SC_{85}	—	October 8, 2013	Palomar	Palomar Transient Factory	·	1.3 km	MPC · JPL
670499	2013 SU_{85}	—	October 2, 2013	Palomar	Palomar Transient Factory	·	1.7 km	MPC · JPL
670500	2013 SH_{88}	—	February 27, 2012	Haleakala	Pan-STARRS 1	·	750 m	MPC · JPL

== 670501–670600 ==
back to top

Designation			Discovery			Properties		Ref
Permanent	Provisional	Named after	Date	Site	Discoverer(s)	Category	Diam.	Ref
670501	2013 SJ_{88}	—	February 2, 2005	Kitt Peak	Spacewatch	EOS	2.5 km	MPC · JPL
670502	2013 ST_{92}	—	September 2, 2013	Mount Lemmon	Mount Lemmon Survey	·	1.4 km	MPC · JPL
670503	2013 SU_{94}	—	October 14, 2009	Mount Lemmon	Mount Lemmon Survey	EUN	1.2 km	MPC · JPL
670504	2013 SB_{96}	—	September 22, 2008	Kitt Peak	Spacewatch	·	2.5 km	MPC · JPL
670505	2013 SF_{98}	—	March 5, 2011	Kitt Peak	Spacewatch	·	1.3 km	MPC · JPL
670506	2013 ST_{101}	—	December 3, 2005	Mauna Kea	A. Boattini	·	1.4 km	MPC · JPL
670507	2013 TC_{3}	—	September 12, 2013	Palomar	Palomar Transient Factory	·	1.8 km	MPC · JPL
670508	2013 TB_{4}	—	September 6, 2013	Catalina	CSS	T_{j} (2.98)	4.3 km	MPC · JPL
670509	2013 TD_{10}	—	September 30, 2013	Palomar	Palomar Transient Factory	·	1.6 km	MPC · JPL
670510	2013 TN_{12}	—	September 28, 2013	Mount Lemmon	Mount Lemmon Survey	·	1.3 km	MPC · JPL
670511	2013 TP_{16}	—	October 1, 2013	Mount Lemmon	Mount Lemmon Survey	·	1.2 km	MPC · JPL
670512	2013 TN_{17}	—	October 24, 2005	Mauna Kea	A. Boattini	NEM	2.2 km	MPC · JPL
670513	2013 TU_{24}	—	December 1, 2006	Kitt Peak	Spacewatch	·	1.0 km	MPC · JPL
670514	2013 TX_{27}	—	September 15, 2013	Mount Lemmon	Mount Lemmon Survey	·	1.4 km	MPC · JPL
670515	2013 TB_{43}	—	February 24, 2006	Mount Lemmon	Mount Lemmon Survey	L5	9.2 km	MPC · JPL
670516	2013 TF_{52}	—	October 4, 2013	Mount Lemmon	Mount Lemmon Survey	BAR	890 m	MPC · JPL
670517	2013 TH_{54}	—	October 4, 2013	Mount Lemmon	Mount Lemmon Survey	·	1.3 km	MPC · JPL
670518	2013 TL_{54}	—	October 8, 2007	Kitt Peak	Spacewatch	(45637)	3.4 km	MPC · JPL
670519	2013 TS_{54}	—	October 4, 2013	Mount Lemmon	Mount Lemmon Survey	·	1.3 km	MPC · JPL
670520	2013 TG_{58}	—	September 26, 2013	Catalina	CSS	H	440 m	MPC · JPL
670521	2013 TJ_{58}	—	October 4, 2013	Mount Lemmon	Mount Lemmon Survey	·	1.4 km	MPC · JPL
670522	2013 TN_{60}	—	October 4, 2013	Mount Lemmon	Mount Lemmon Survey	·	850 m	MPC · JPL
670523	2013 TT_{60}	—	January 7, 2010	Mount Lemmon	Mount Lemmon Survey	·	2.9 km	MPC · JPL
670524	2013 TP_{61}	—	October 4, 2013	Mount Lemmon	Mount Lemmon Survey	·	1.9 km	MPC · JPL
670525	2013 TS_{62}	—	January 22, 2006	Mount Lemmon	Mount Lemmon Survey	·	1.5 km	MPC · JPL
670526	2013 TQ_{68}	—	March 15, 2004	Wrightwood	J. W. Young	·	1.5 km	MPC · JPL
670527	2013 TD_{73}	—	September 26, 2002	Palomar	NEAT	·	990 m	MPC · JPL
670528	2013 TG_{73}	—	September 13, 2002	Palomar	NEAT	·	970 m	MPC · JPL
670529	2013 TF_{74}	—	September 12, 2013	Mount Lemmon	Mount Lemmon Survey	·	700 m	MPC · JPL
670530	2013 TK_{74}	—	October 2, 2013	Mount Lemmon	Mount Lemmon Survey	EUN	1.2 km	MPC · JPL
670531	2013 TD_{90}	—	October 1, 2013	Kitt Peak	Spacewatch	·	1.4 km	MPC · JPL
670532	2013 TL_{90}	—	October 13, 2010	Mount Lemmon	Mount Lemmon Survey	·	780 m	MPC · JPL
670533	2013 TZ_{93}	—	October 1, 2013	Kitt Peak	Spacewatch	·	1.5 km	MPC · JPL
670534	2013 TJ_{94}	—	January 30, 2011	Haleakala	Pan-STARRS 1	·	1.5 km	MPC · JPL
670535	2013 TT_{104}	—	October 3, 2013	Kitt Peak	Spacewatch	·	1.8 km	MPC · JPL
670536	2013 TT_{109}	—	October 3, 2013	Kitt Peak	Spacewatch	·	1.0 km	MPC · JPL
670537	2013 TV_{111}	—	September 12, 2013	Mount Lemmon	Mount Lemmon Survey	(5)	1.0 km	MPC · JPL
670538	2013 TH_{114}	—	October 3, 2013	Haleakala	Pan-STARRS 1	VER	3.0 km	MPC · JPL
670539	2013 TO_{115}	—	September 13, 2013	Mount Lemmon	Mount Lemmon Survey	·	1.7 km	MPC · JPL
670540	2013 TX_{115}	—	August 9, 2004	Socorro	LINEAR	·	1.5 km	MPC · JPL
670541	2013 TK_{116}	—	September 1, 2013	Oukaïmeden	C. Rinner	(5)	1.0 km	MPC · JPL
670542	2013 TH_{118}	—	October 4, 2013	Mount Lemmon	Mount Lemmon Survey	·	1.3 km	MPC · JPL
670543	2013 TC_{119}	—	May 8, 2011	Mount Lemmon	Mount Lemmon Survey	·	3.2 km	MPC · JPL
670544	2013 TZ_{121}	—	October 13, 2004	Kitt Peak	Spacewatch	·	1.7 km	MPC · JPL
670545	2013 TE_{125}	—	August 18, 2002	Palomar	NEAT	·	940 m	MPC · JPL
670546	2013 TW_{137}	—	October 7, 2013	Oukaïmeden	C. Rinner	DOR	1.9 km	MPC · JPL
670547	2013 TY_{142}	—	September 23, 2008	Mount Lemmon	Mount Lemmon Survey	·	1.6 km	MPC · JPL
670548	2013 TH_{143}	—	March 23, 2012	Mount Lemmon	Mount Lemmon Survey	NYS	1.1 km	MPC · JPL
670549	2013 TG_{160}	—	September 24, 2008	Mount Lemmon	Mount Lemmon Survey	H	420 m	MPC · JPL
670550	2013 TM_{160}	—	September 17, 2013	Mount Lemmon	Mount Lemmon Survey	·	1.1 km	MPC · JPL
670551	2013 TF_{162}	—	October 3, 2013	Haleakala	Pan-STARRS 1	·	1.4 km	MPC · JPL
670552	2013 TB_{163}	—	August 24, 2008	Kitt Peak	Spacewatch	·	1.7 km	MPC · JPL
670553	2013 TH_{164}	—	October 1, 2013	Kitt Peak	Spacewatch	·	1.6 km	MPC · JPL
670554	2013 TS_{164}	—	October 6, 2013	Kitt Peak	Spacewatch	·	1.6 km	MPC · JPL
670555	2013 TK_{165}	—	November 8, 2009	Mount Lemmon	Mount Lemmon Survey	·	1.4 km	MPC · JPL
670556	2013 TR_{165}	—	October 1, 2013	Kitt Peak	Spacewatch	·	1.1 km	MPC · JPL
670557	2013 TN_{167}	—	October 3, 2013	Haleakala	Pan-STARRS 1	AEO	910 m	MPC · JPL
670558	2013 TD_{169}	—	October 5, 2013	Haleakala	Pan-STARRS 1	·	1.3 km	MPC · JPL
670559	2013 TL_{170}	—	October 12, 2013	Kitt Peak	Spacewatch	·	1.4 km	MPC · JPL
670560	2013 TY_{170}	—	August 22, 2004	Kitt Peak	Spacewatch	MIS	1.9 km	MPC · JPL
670561	2013 TK_{171}	—	October 2, 2013	Kitt Peak	Spacewatch	·	1.1 km	MPC · JPL
670562	2013 TN_{172}	—	February 14, 2016	Haleakala	Pan-STARRS 1	MAR	870 m	MPC · JPL
670563	2013 TF_{173}	—	October 2, 2013	Kitt Peak	Spacewatch	·	1.4 km	MPC · JPL
670564	2013 TF_{174}	—	October 3, 2013	Mayhill-ISON	L. Elenin	(5)	960 m	MPC · JPL
670565	2013 TA_{175}	—	October 2, 2013	Kitt Peak	Spacewatch	(5)	1.0 km	MPC · JPL
670566	2013 TF_{175}	—	October 3, 2013	Haleakala	Pan-STARRS 1	·	700 m	MPC · JPL
670567	2013 TQ_{175}	—	October 3, 2013	Kitt Peak	Spacewatch	·	1.2 km	MPC · JPL
670568	2013 TT_{176}	—	October 7, 2013	Mount Lemmon	Mount Lemmon Survey	·	1.2 km	MPC · JPL
670569	2013 TA_{177}	—	October 6, 2013	Mount Lemmon	Mount Lemmon Survey	MAR	840 m	MPC · JPL
670570	2013 TR_{177}	—	January 23, 2015	Haleakala	Pan-STARRS 1	ADE	1.5 km	MPC · JPL
670571	2013 TJ_{178}	—	October 9, 2013	Mount Lemmon	Mount Lemmon Survey	·	980 m	MPC · JPL
670572	2013 TK_{182}	—	October 12, 2013	Oukaïmeden	C. Rinner	·	1.4 km	MPC · JPL
670573	2013 TA_{184}	—	October 8, 2013	XuYi	PMO NEO Survey Program	·	1.7 km	MPC · JPL
670574	2013 TG_{188}	—	January 16, 2015	Haleakala	Pan-STARRS 1	·	1.1 km	MPC · JPL
670575	2013 TJ_{192}	—	October 3, 2013	Haleakala	Pan-STARRS 1	·	1.3 km	MPC · JPL
670576	2013 TV_{195}	—	October 3, 2013	Haleakala	Pan-STARRS 1	·	1.7 km	MPC · JPL
670577	2013 TG_{199}	—	October 4, 2013	Palomar	Palomar Transient Factory	·	1.9 km	MPC · JPL
670578	2013 TS_{199}	—	October 4, 2013	Catalina	CSS	·	1.7 km	MPC · JPL
670579	2013 TW_{209}	—	October 3, 2013	Mount Lemmon	Mount Lemmon Survey	H	350 m	MPC · JPL
670580	2013 TQ_{213}	—	October 8, 2013	Haleakala	Pan-STARRS 1	·	1.7 km	MPC · JPL
670581	2013 TA_{220}	—	October 12, 2013	Catalina	CSS	·	1.6 km	MPC · JPL
670582	2013 TH_{220}	—	October 4, 2013	Haleakala	Pan-STARRS 1	·	1.6 km	MPC · JPL
670583	2013 TU_{220}	—	October 3, 2013	Kitt Peak	Spacewatch	(5)	900 m	MPC · JPL
670584	2013 TV_{229}	—	October 8, 2013	Palomar	Palomar Transient Factory	H	330 m	MPC · JPL
670585	2013 TU_{235}	—	January 8, 2010	Kitt Peak	Spacewatch	·	1.5 km	MPC · JPL
670586	2013 TF_{236}	—	October 4, 2013	Mount Lemmon	Mount Lemmon Survey	·	1.4 km	MPC · JPL
670587	2013 TM_{240}	—	October 3, 2013	Haleakala	Pan-STARRS 1	·	1.5 km	MPC · JPL
670588	2013 UG	—	May 21, 2013	Mount Lemmon	Mount Lemmon Survey	BAR	1.4 km	MPC · JPL
670589	2013 UH_{3}	—	November 3, 2004	Palomar	NEAT	·	1.7 km	MPC · JPL
670590	2013 UX_{12}	—	October 3, 2013	Haleakala	Pan-STARRS 1	·	1.3 km	MPC · JPL
670591	2013 UW_{14}	—	November 26, 2005	Mount Lemmon	Mount Lemmon Survey	H	390 m	MPC · JPL
670592	2013 UB_{16}	—	October 24, 2013	Haleakala	Pan-STARRS 1	H	430 m	MPC · JPL
670593	2013 UJ_{19}	—	September 3, 2008	Kitt Peak	Spacewatch	·	1.6 km	MPC · JPL
670594	2013 UK_{21}	—	October 26, 2013	Mount Lemmon	Mount Lemmon Survey	·	1.6 km	MPC · JPL
670595	2013 UO_{22}	—	October 30, 2013	Haleakala	Pan-STARRS 1	·	1.3 km	MPC · JPL
670596	2013 UW_{22}	—	October 28, 2013	Mount Lemmon	Mount Lemmon Survey	·	1.9 km	MPC · JPL
670597	2013 UK_{23}	—	October 18, 2013	Mount Lemmon	Mount Lemmon Survey	·	1.1 km	MPC · JPL
670598	2013 UU_{23}	—	October 28, 2013	Kitt Peak	Spacewatch	·	770 m	MPC · JPL
670599	2013 US_{24}	—	October 24, 2013	Mount Lemmon	Mount Lemmon Survey	AST	1.3 km	MPC · JPL
670600	2013 UC_{25}	—	October 26, 2013	Mount Lemmon	Mount Lemmon Survey	BRG	970 m	MPC · JPL

== 670601–670700 ==
back to top

Designation			Discovery			Properties		Ref
Permanent	Provisional	Named after	Date	Site	Discoverer(s)	Category	Diam.	Ref
670601	2013 UP_{28}	—	October 30, 2013	Haleakala	Pan-STARRS 1	·	1.6 km	MPC · JPL
670602	2013 UB_{30}	—	July 26, 2017	Haleakala	Pan-STARRS 1	·	1.4 km	MPC · JPL
670603	2013 UW_{33}	—	October 24, 2013	Mount Lemmon	Mount Lemmon Survey	·	1.4 km	MPC · JPL
670604	2013 UL_{34}	—	October 23, 2013	Mount Lemmon	Mount Lemmon Survey	·	1.4 km	MPC · JPL
670605	2013 UU_{40}	—	October 26, 2013	Mount Lemmon	Mount Lemmon Survey	V	550 m	MPC · JPL
670606	2013 UZ_{49}	—	October 26, 2013	Mount Lemmon	Mount Lemmon Survey	(12739)	1.3 km	MPC · JPL
670607	2013 UT_{54}	—	October 25, 2013	Kitt Peak	Spacewatch	·	1.6 km	MPC · JPL
670608	2013 UZ_{55}	—	October 25, 2013	Mount Lemmon	Mount Lemmon Survey	·	1.4 km	MPC · JPL
670609	2013 VN_{2}	—	October 11, 2013	Catalina	CSS	·	2.4 km	MPC · JPL
670610	2013 VK_{5}	—	November 4, 2013	Catalina	CSS	APO	280 m	MPC · JPL
670611	2013 VU_{10}	—	October 6, 2013	Palomar	Palomar Transient Factory	·	1.2 km	MPC · JPL
670612	2013 VQ_{15}	—	November 16, 2009	Mount Lemmon	Mount Lemmon Survey	NEM	2.0 km	MPC · JPL
670613	2013 VR_{15}	—	October 24, 2005	Mauna Kea	A. Boattini	·	1.7 km	MPC · JPL
670614	2013 VJ_{18}	—	December 28, 2005	Kitt Peak	Spacewatch	(5)	1.2 km	MPC · JPL
670615	2013 VG_{23}	—	October 15, 2013	Kitt Peak	Spacewatch	H	400 m	MPC · JPL
670616	2013 VZ_{26}	—	October 3, 2013	Kitt Peak	Spacewatch	·	1.3 km	MPC · JPL
670617	2013 VQ_{27}	—	October 15, 2004	Mount Lemmon	Mount Lemmon Survey	·	1.6 km	MPC · JPL
670618	2013 VS_{27}	—	November 2, 2013	Kitt Peak	Spacewatch	NEM	1.9 km	MPC · JPL
670619	2013 VM_{28}	—	November 4, 2013	Mount Lemmon	Mount Lemmon Survey	·	1.3 km	MPC · JPL
670620	2013 VY_{28}	—	November 9, 2013	Kitt Peak	Spacewatch	WIT	860 m	MPC · JPL
670621	2013 VL_{30}	—	November 11, 2013	Kitt Peak	Spacewatch	TIN	1.1 km	MPC · JPL
670622	2013 VA_{32}	—	November 1, 2013	Mount Lemmon	Mount Lemmon Survey	·	1.2 km	MPC · JPL
670623	2013 VJ_{32}	—	October 24, 2013	Kitt Peak	Spacewatch	·	950 m	MPC · JPL
670624	2013 VT_{32}	—	November 11, 2013	Mount Lemmon	Mount Lemmon Survey	·	1.4 km	MPC · JPL
670625	2013 VZ_{32}	—	November 10, 2013	Mount Lemmon	Mount Lemmon Survey	KON	1.7 km	MPC · JPL
670626	2013 VO_{33}	—	November 11, 2013	Kitt Peak	Spacewatch	MAR	820 m	MPC · JPL
670627	2013 VV_{33}	—	November 1, 2013	Mount Lemmon	Mount Lemmon Survey	·	1.1 km	MPC · JPL
670628	2013 VU_{34}	—	January 27, 2015	Haleakala	Pan-STARRS 1	·	1.5 km	MPC · JPL
670629	2013 VX_{34}	—	November 2, 2013	Kitt Peak	Spacewatch	·	1.0 km	MPC · JPL
670630	2013 VA_{35}	—	March 7, 2016	Haleakala	Pan-STARRS 1	·	1.1 km	MPC · JPL
670631	2013 VB_{35}	—	August 5, 2004	Palomar	NEAT	·	1.2 km	MPC · JPL
670632	2013 VQ_{36}	—	November 4, 2013	XuYi	PMO NEO Survey Program	·	1.9 km	MPC · JPL
670633	2013 VP_{37}	—	November 1, 2013	Mount Lemmon	Mount Lemmon Survey	·	480 m	MPC · JPL
670634	2013 VL_{39}	—	November 12, 2013	Mount Lemmon	Mount Lemmon Survey	·	1.8 km	MPC · JPL
670635	2013 VS_{39}	—	November 4, 2013	Mount Lemmon	Mount Lemmon Survey	(5)	820 m	MPC · JPL
670636	2013 VP_{40}	—	November 11, 2013	Mount Lemmon	Mount Lemmon Survey	·	1.0 km	MPC · JPL
670637	2013 VA_{41}	—	November 4, 2013	Mount Lemmon	Mount Lemmon Survey	·	1.4 km	MPC · JPL
670638	2013 VA_{42}	—	November 10, 2013	Mount Lemmon	Mount Lemmon Survey	·	1.4 km	MPC · JPL
670639	2013 VT_{51}	—	November 8, 2013	Kitt Peak	Spacewatch	·	1.1 km	MPC · JPL
670640	2013 VL_{64}	—	November 2, 2013	Mount Lemmon	Mount Lemmon Survey	BRG	1 km	MPC · JPL
670641	2013 VM_{78}	—	November 12, 2013	Mount Lemmon	Mount Lemmon Survey	·	1.6 km	MPC · JPL
670642	2013 WG	—	May 15, 2002	Haleakala	NEAT	H	580 m	MPC · JPL
670643	2013 WP_{1}	—	September 15, 2009	Kitt Peak	Spacewatch	(5)	920 m	MPC · JPL
670644	2013 WG_{2}	—	November 26, 2013	Haleakala	Pan-STARRS 1	HNS	1.2 km	MPC · JPL
670645	2013 WH_{6}	—	August 21, 2000	Anderson Mesa	LONEOS	·	1.3 km	MPC · JPL
670646	2013 WG_{7}	—	November 6, 2013	Haleakala	Pan-STARRS 1	·	1.7 km	MPC · JPL
670647	2013 WP_{7}	—	September 29, 2013	Mount Lemmon	Mount Lemmon Survey	·	1.1 km	MPC · JPL
670648	2013 WD_{20}	—	February 27, 2006	Mount Lemmon	Mount Lemmon Survey	·	1.9 km	MPC · JPL
670649	2013 WV_{27}	—	April 5, 2011	Mount Lemmon	Mount Lemmon Survey	·	1.3 km	MPC · JPL
670650	2013 WS_{28}	—	September 22, 2008	Catalina	CSS	·	1.8 km	MPC · JPL
670651	2013 WM_{29}	—	November 26, 2013	Mount Lemmon	Mount Lemmon Survey	·	1.5 km	MPC · JPL
670652	2013 WZ_{29}	—	August 16, 2009	La Sagra	OAM	·	940 m	MPC · JPL
670653	2013 WG_{36}	—	February 1, 2003	Kitt Peak	Spacewatch	EUN	1.2 km	MPC · JPL
670654	2013 WY_{36}	—	September 4, 2008	Kitt Peak	Spacewatch	·	1.6 km	MPC · JPL
670655	2013 WR_{38}	—	September 14, 2013	Mount Lemmon	Mount Lemmon Survey	·	1.3 km	MPC · JPL
670656	2013 WZ_{40}	—	November 28, 2013	Mount Lemmon	Mount Lemmon Survey	·	1.7 km	MPC · JPL
670657	2013 WX_{41}	—	November 28, 2013	Nogales	M. Schwartz, P. R. Holvorcem	·	920 m	MPC · JPL
670658	2013 WK_{42}	—	November 1, 2013	Mount Lemmon	Mount Lemmon Survey	·	980 m	MPC · JPL
670659	2013 WD_{43}	—	November 28, 2013	Mount Lemmon	Mount Lemmon Survey	·	630 m	MPC · JPL
670660	2013 WM_{45}	—	April 14, 2007	Catalina	CSS	H	410 m	MPC · JPL
670661	2013 WO_{45}	—	September 17, 2013	Mount Lemmon	Mount Lemmon Survey	H	460 m	MPC · JPL
670662	2013 WG_{46}	—	February 6, 2007	Palomar	NEAT	·	1.4 km	MPC · JPL
670663	2013 WC_{51}	—	October 7, 2004	Kitt Peak	Spacewatch	·	2.1 km	MPC · JPL
670664	2013 WX_{52}	—	November 25, 2013	Haleakala	Pan-STARRS 1	·	1.1 km	MPC · JPL
670665	2013 WG_{59}	—	December 10, 2002	Palomar	NEAT	NYS	1.1 km	MPC · JPL
670666	2013 WC_{64}	—	November 25, 2013	Haleakala	Pan-STARRS 1	·	1.2 km	MPC · JPL
670667	2013 WF_{66}	—	September 25, 2008	Kitt Peak	Spacewatch	·	1.6 km	MPC · JPL
670668	2013 WS_{66}	—	December 9, 2002	Kitt Peak	Spacewatch	H	570 m	MPC · JPL
670669	2013 WH_{68}	—	November 24, 2013	ASC-Kislovodsk	Nevski, V.	·	1.3 km	MPC · JPL
670670	2013 WT_{71}	—	September 16, 2009	Catalina	CSS	·	1.2 km	MPC · JPL
670671	2013 WH_{77}	—	September 26, 2008	Kitt Peak	Spacewatch	·	1.5 km	MPC · JPL
670672	2013 WA_{78}	—	October 15, 2004	Kitt Peak	Spacewatch	526	2.2 km	MPC · JPL
670673	2013 WV_{78}	—	November 9, 2004	Mauna Kea	Veillet, C.	EUN	1.3 km	MPC · JPL
670674	2013 WM_{80}	—	March 16, 2010	Bisei	BATTeRS	GEF	1.3 km	MPC · JPL
670675	2013 WE_{81}	—	September 14, 2013	Mount Lemmon	Mount Lemmon Survey	(5)	1.1 km	MPC · JPL
670676	2013 WG_{81}	—	October 24, 2013	Kitt Peak	Spacewatch	·	1.7 km	MPC · JPL
670677	2013 WL_{84}	—	November 27, 2013	Haleakala	Pan-STARRS 1	·	970 m	MPC · JPL
670678	2013 WB_{86}	—	September 24, 2008	Kitt Peak	Spacewatch	·	1.6 km	MPC · JPL
670679	2013 WZ_{88}	—	December 20, 2009	Kitt Peak	Spacewatch	·	1.1 km	MPC · JPL
670680	2013 WB_{94}	—	October 8, 2008	Mount Lemmon	Mount Lemmon Survey	·	1.4 km	MPC · JPL
670681	2013 WD_{94}	—	August 14, 2004	Cerro Tololo	Deep Ecliptic Survey	·	1.0 km	MPC · JPL
670682	2013 WA_{98}	—	November 28, 2013	Mount Lemmon	Mount Lemmon Survey	EOS	1.7 km	MPC · JPL
670683	2013 WY_{99}	—	November 29, 2013	Mount Lemmon	Mount Lemmon Survey	NEM	1.8 km	MPC · JPL
670684	2013 WH_{100}	—	November 29, 2013	Mount Lemmon	Mount Lemmon Survey	·	1.4 km	MPC · JPL
670685	2013 WQ_{100}	—	September 21, 2008	Mount Lemmon	Mount Lemmon Survey	·	1.4 km	MPC · JPL
670686	2013 WT_{106}	—	October 7, 2013	Mount Lemmon	Mount Lemmon Survey	·	1.2 km	MPC · JPL
670687	2013 WE_{107}	—	September 7, 2008	Mount Lemmon	Mount Lemmon Survey	·	1.3 km	MPC · JPL
670688	2013 WE_{108}	—	January 16, 2005	Catalina	CSS	·	2.9 km	MPC · JPL
670689	2013 WL_{111}	—	November 27, 2013	Haleakala	Pan-STARRS 1	·	1.1 km	MPC · JPL
670690	2013 WY_{113}	—	November 28, 2013	Mount Lemmon	Mount Lemmon Survey	·	1.2 km	MPC · JPL
670691	2013 WV_{114}	—	November 29, 2013	Haleakala	Pan-STARRS 1	EUN	900 m	MPC · JPL
670692	2013 WT_{117}	—	November 28, 2013	Nogales	M. Schwartz, P. R. Holvorcem	·	1.3 km	MPC · JPL
670693	2013 WL_{118}	—	November 28, 2013	Kitt Peak	Spacewatch	·	780 m	MPC · JPL
670694	2013 WM_{120}	—	November 28, 2013	Mount Lemmon	Mount Lemmon Survey	MRX	730 m	MPC · JPL
670695	2013 WP_{120}	—	October 26, 2013	Mount Lemmon	Mount Lemmon Survey	·	1.4 km	MPC · JPL
670696	2013 WD_{125}	—	May 21, 2015	Haleakala	Pan-STARRS 1	·	760 m	MPC · JPL
670697	2013 WY_{126}	—	November 28, 2013	Mount Lemmon	Mount Lemmon Survey	·	1.7 km	MPC · JPL
670698	2013 WD_{129}	—	November 28, 2013	Mount Lemmon	Mount Lemmon Survey	·	1.5 km	MPC · JPL
670699	2013 WW_{137}	—	November 27, 2013	Haleakala	Pan-STARRS 1	·	1.5 km	MPC · JPL
670700	2013 WG_{141}	—	November 24, 2013	Haleakala	Pan-STARRS 1	GAL	1.4 km	MPC · JPL

== 670701–670800 ==
back to top

Designation			Discovery			Properties		Ref
Permanent	Provisional	Named after	Date	Site	Discoverer(s)	Category	Diam.	Ref
670701	2013 WO_{143}	—	September 23, 2008	Mount Lemmon	Mount Lemmon Survey	·	1.5 km	MPC · JPL
670702	2013 XD	—	December 1, 2013	SM Montmagastrell	Bosch, J. M., Olivera, R.	·	4.0 km	MPC · JPL
670703	2013 XS_{1}	—	September 28, 2008	Mount Lemmon	Mount Lemmon Survey	WIT	940 m	MPC · JPL
670704	2013 XC_{3}	—	November 27, 2013	Haleakala	Pan-STARRS 1	·	1.7 km	MPC · JPL
670705	2013 XO_{9}	—	June 2, 2003	Cerro Tololo	Deep Ecliptic Survey	RAF	990 m	MPC · JPL
670706	2013 XM_{10}	—	August 30, 2005	Palomar	NEAT	·	1.4 km	MPC · JPL
670707	2013 XU_{20}	—	July 18, 2013	Haleakala	Pan-STARRS 1	·	1.6 km	MPC · JPL
670708	2013 XE_{21}	—	November 14, 2013	Mount Lemmon	Mount Lemmon Survey	·	2.0 km	MPC · JPL
670709	2013 XE_{23}	—	December 3, 2013	Haleakala	Pan-STARRS 1	HNS	1.0 km	MPC · JPL
670710	2013 XB_{24}	—	November 1, 2013	Haleakala	Pan-STARRS 1	·	1.0 km	MPC · JPL
670711	2013 XB_{27}	—	September 18, 2003	Kitt Peak	Spacewatch	·	1.5 km	MPC · JPL
670712	2013 XU_{28}	—	December 13, 2013	Mount Lemmon	Mount Lemmon Survey	·	1.5 km	MPC · JPL
670713	2013 XA_{29}	—	December 3, 2013	Oukaïmeden	M. Ory	·	990 m	MPC · JPL
670714	2013 XG_{29}	—	December 3, 2013	Mount Lemmon	Mount Lemmon Survey	(5)	920 m	MPC · JPL
670715	2013 XH_{29}	—	December 11, 2013	Mount Lemmon	Mount Lemmon Survey	·	1.6 km	MPC · JPL
670716	2013 XS_{29}	—	April 11, 2016	Haleakala	Pan-STARRS 1	·	1.4 km	MPC · JPL
670717	2013 XG_{33}	—	October 31, 2007	Catalina	CSS	·	2.6 km	MPC · JPL
670718	2013 XQ_{34}	—	December 10, 2013	Mount Lemmon	Mount Lemmon Survey	·	1.1 km	MPC · JPL
670719	2013 XK_{39}	—	December 11, 2013	Mount Lemmon	Mount Lemmon Survey	·	1.4 km	MPC · JPL
670720	2013 XK_{40}	—	December 11, 2013	Haleakala	Pan-STARRS 1	(5)	1.0 km	MPC · JPL
670721	2013 YQ	—	October 6, 2013	Mount Lemmon	Mount Lemmon Survey	·	1.6 km	MPC · JPL
670722	2013 YV	—	February 21, 2006	Catalina	CSS	RAF	1.0 km	MPC · JPL
670723	2013 YD_{2}	—	December 23, 2013	Haleakala	Pan-STARRS 1	·	1.6 km	MPC · JPL
670724	2013 YK_{7}	—	May 13, 2007	Kitt Peak	Spacewatch	·	1.7 km	MPC · JPL
670725	2013 YO_{7}	—	January 29, 1996	Kitt Peak	Spacewatch	·	1.6 km	MPC · JPL
670726	2013 YP_{10}	—	June 23, 2007	Kitt Peak	Spacewatch	·	2.3 km	MPC · JPL
670727	2013 YL_{11}	—	October 3, 1999	Socorro	LINEAR	·	2.3 km	MPC · JPL
670728	2013 YV_{11}	—	December 4, 2013	Haleakala	Pan-STARRS 1	·	700 m	MPC · JPL
670729	2013 YV_{16}	—	October 8, 2004	Kitt Peak	Spacewatch	MIS	2.0 km	MPC · JPL
670730	2013 YX_{16}	—	November 26, 2013	Mount Lemmon	Mount Lemmon Survey	·	1.9 km	MPC · JPL
670731	2013 YO_{22}	—	October 5, 2004	Palomar	NEAT	·	1.8 km	MPC · JPL
670732	2013 YM_{30}	—	December 24, 2013	Mount Lemmon	Mount Lemmon Survey	·	1.7 km	MPC · JPL
670733	2013 YZ_{30}	—	November 5, 2013	La Silla	A. Galád	PAD	1.6 km	MPC · JPL
670734	2013 YY_{36}	—	December 27, 2013	Mount Lemmon	Mount Lemmon Survey	·	1.9 km	MPC · JPL
670735	2013 YU_{42}	—	December 26, 2013	Kitt Peak	Spacewatch	·	1.3 km	MPC · JPL
670736	2013 YT_{43}	—	February 26, 2003	Campo Imperatore	CINEOS	·	1.2 km	MPC · JPL
670737	2013 YW_{43}	—	September 22, 2008	Catalina	CSS	·	2.0 km	MPC · JPL
670738	2013 YH_{45}	—	December 11, 2013	Mount Lemmon	Mount Lemmon Survey	·	1.6 km	MPC · JPL
670739	2013 YL_{45}	—	December 3, 2004	Kitt Peak	Spacewatch	·	1.9 km	MPC · JPL
670740 Mihailsandu	2013 YA_{48}	Mihailsandu	September 28, 2013	La Palma	EURONEAR	JUN	800 m	MPC · JPL
670741	2013 YL_{51}	—	October 3, 2013	Haleakala	Pan-STARRS 1	·	1.9 km	MPC · JPL
670742	2013 YK_{53}	—	December 25, 2013	Haleakala	Pan-STARRS 1	·	1.8 km	MPC · JPL
670743	2013 YT_{55}	—	November 28, 2013	Mount Lemmon	Mount Lemmon Survey	·	1.6 km	MPC · JPL
670744 Karsh	2013 YS_{58}	Karsh	January 14, 1997	Dominion	G. C. L. Aikman	·	1.9 km	MPC · JPL
670745	2013 YQ_{59}	—	December 4, 2013	Haleakala	Pan-STARRS 1	(5)	1.2 km	MPC · JPL
670746	2013 YB_{60}	—	December 27, 2013	Kitt Peak	Spacewatch	·	560 m	MPC · JPL
670747	2013 YO_{63}	—	December 27, 2013	Kitt Peak	Spacewatch	·	550 m	MPC · JPL
670748	2013 YJ_{65}	—	February 19, 2010	Catalina	CSS	·	910 m	MPC · JPL
670749	2013 YD_{71}	—	December 25, 2013	Mount Lemmon	Mount Lemmon Survey	GEF	1.4 km	MPC · JPL
670750	2013 YO_{71}	—	December 25, 2013	Mount Lemmon	Mount Lemmon Survey	T_{j} (2.99) · EUP	2.8 km	MPC · JPL
670751	2013 YJ_{73}	—	November 2, 2004	Palomar	NEAT	·	1.7 km	MPC · JPL
670752	2013 YK_{73}	—	October 7, 2004	Anderson Mesa	LONEOS	·	1.3 km	MPC · JPL
670753	2013 YN_{75}	—	August 17, 2001	Palomar	NEAT	·	1.5 km	MPC · JPL
670754	2013 YC_{77}	—	December 27, 2013	Kitt Peak	Spacewatch	·	1.1 km	MPC · JPL
670755	2013 YO_{77}	—	December 21, 2008	Kitt Peak	Spacewatch	·	1.4 km	MPC · JPL
670756	2013 YD_{80}	—	December 28, 2013	Kitt Peak	Spacewatch	·	1.6 km	MPC · JPL
670757	2013 YL_{80}	—	December 28, 2013	Kitt Peak	Spacewatch	·	1.5 km	MPC · JPL
670758	2013 YX_{82}	—	August 20, 2001	Cerro Tololo	Deep Ecliptic Survey	V	660 m	MPC · JPL
670759	2013 YT_{84}	—	August 6, 2008	Siding Spring	SSS	V	720 m	MPC · JPL
670760	2013 YJ_{86}	—	December 28, 2013	Kitt Peak	Spacewatch	·	1.4 km	MPC · JPL
670761	2013 YX_{86}	—	December 28, 2013	Kitt Peak	Spacewatch	·	2.2 km	MPC · JPL
670762	2013 YC_{87}	—	December 28, 2013	Kitt Peak	Spacewatch	·	360 m	MPC · JPL
670763	2013 YK_{87}	—	December 28, 2013	Kitt Peak	Spacewatch	(5)	1.0 km	MPC · JPL
670764	2013 YM_{91}	—	October 26, 2013	Mount Lemmon	Mount Lemmon Survey	·	1.5 km	MPC · JPL
670765	2013 YJ_{93}	—	December 30, 2013	Kitt Peak	Spacewatch	BRA	1.3 km	MPC · JPL
670766	2013 YY_{101}	—	October 7, 2008	Mount Lemmon	Mount Lemmon Survey	·	1.6 km	MPC · JPL
670767	2013 YE_{104}	—	December 5, 2002	Socorro	LINEAR	MAS	810 m	MPC · JPL
670768	2013 YP_{104}	—	December 31, 2000	Haleakala	NEAT	H	580 m	MPC · JPL
670769	2013 YY_{107}	—	November 28, 2013	Mount Lemmon	Mount Lemmon Survey	·	1.4 km	MPC · JPL
670770	2013 YM_{110}	—	December 27, 2013	Kitt Peak	Spacewatch	·	1.0 km	MPC · JPL
670771	2013 YQ_{110}	—	February 17, 2002	Palomar	NEAT	·	1.1 km	MPC · JPL
670772	2013 YT_{111}	—	August 3, 2008	Marly	P. Kocher	ADE	1.7 km	MPC · JPL
670773	2013 YF_{112}	—	December 30, 2013	Kitt Peak	Spacewatch	·	1.0 km	MPC · JPL
670774	2013 YW_{117}	—	November 19, 2008	Mount Lemmon	Mount Lemmon Survey	AGN	870 m	MPC · JPL
670775	2013 YC_{120}	—	September 17, 2012	Mount Lemmon	Mount Lemmon Survey	·	1.8 km	MPC · JPL
670776	2013 YR_{121}	—	December 25, 2013	Kitt Peak	Spacewatch	·	950 m	MPC · JPL
670777	2013 YU_{123}	—	December 17, 2000	Kitt Peak	Spacewatch	·	1.2 km	MPC · JPL
670778	2013 YZ_{124}	—	April 28, 2007	Kitt Peak	Spacewatch	·	1.3 km	MPC · JPL
670779	2013 YS_{126}	—	December 31, 2013	Mount Lemmon	Mount Lemmon Survey	·	1.1 km	MPC · JPL
670780	2013 YV_{134}	—	March 2, 2006	Kitt Peak	Spacewatch	·	1.4 km	MPC · JPL
670781	2013 YA_{137}	—	December 6, 2013	Haleakala	Pan-STARRS 1	BRA	1.2 km	MPC · JPL
670782	2013 YZ_{137}	—	December 31, 2013	Mount Lemmon	Mount Lemmon Survey	·	1.4 km	MPC · JPL
670783	2013 YA_{139}	—	November 29, 2013	Mount Lemmon	Mount Lemmon Survey	·	580 m	MPC · JPL
670784	2013 YK_{142}	—	December 31, 2013	Mount Lemmon	Mount Lemmon Survey	(5)	1.1 km	MPC · JPL
670785	2013 YY_{153}	—	August 26, 2012	Kitt Peak	Spacewatch	AGN	930 m	MPC · JPL
670786	2013 YP_{155}	—	October 17, 2017	Mount Lemmon	Mount Lemmon Survey	HNS	960 m	MPC · JPL
670787	2013 YN_{158}	—	December 24, 2013	Mount Lemmon	Mount Lemmon Survey	·	970 m	MPC · JPL
670788	2013 YO_{162}	—	December 30, 2013	Haleakala	Pan-STARRS 1	·	880 m	MPC · JPL
670789	2013 YZ_{163}	—	December 26, 2013	Mount Lemmon	Mount Lemmon Survey	BRA	1.3 km	MPC · JPL
670790	2013 YA_{164}	—	December 29, 2013	Haleakala	Pan-STARRS 1	·	1.5 km	MPC · JPL
670791	2013 YV_{165}	—	December 31, 2013	Kitt Peak	Spacewatch	·	650 m	MPC · JPL
670792	2013 YJ_{169}	—	December 30, 2013	Mount Lemmon	Mount Lemmon Survey	·	1.0 km	MPC · JPL
670793	2014 AF	—	December 10, 2013	Mount Lemmon	Mount Lemmon Survey	·	950 m	MPC · JPL
670794	2014 AK	—	October 21, 2008	Mount Lemmon	Mount Lemmon Survey	·	1.7 km	MPC · JPL
670795	2014 AS	—	August 23, 2001	Anderson Mesa	LONEOS	V	720 m	MPC · JPL
670796	2014 AA_{5}	—	July 29, 2008	Kitt Peak	Spacewatch	V	760 m	MPC · JPL
670797	2014 AF_{6}	—	February 13, 2011	Mount Lemmon	Mount Lemmon Survey	·	620 m	MPC · JPL
670798	2014 AK_{8}	—	February 25, 2011	Mount Lemmon	Mount Lemmon Survey	·	490 m	MPC · JPL
670799	2014 AU_{16}	—	January 4, 2014	Haleakala	Pan-STARRS 1	H	430 m	MPC · JPL
670800	2014 AA_{21}	—	August 20, 2009	Kitt Peak	Spacewatch	·	570 m	MPC · JPL

== 670801–670900 ==
back to top

Designation			Discovery			Properties		Ref
Permanent	Provisional	Named after	Date	Site	Discoverer(s)	Category	Diam.	Ref
670801	2014 AN_{21}	—	November 9, 2013	Haleakala	Pan-STARRS 1	·	1.3 km	MPC · JPL
670802	2014 AZ_{23}	—	January 3, 2014	Mount Lemmon	Mount Lemmon Survey	·	1.1 km	MPC · JPL
670803	2014 AP_{26}	—	December 24, 2013	Mount Lemmon	Mount Lemmon Survey	PHO	1.1 km	MPC · JPL
670804	2014 AZ_{28}	—	January 24, 2004	Socorro	LINEAR	·	200 m	MPC · JPL
670805	2014 AV_{33}	—	January 2, 2014	Kitt Peak	Spacewatch	·	1.0 km	MPC · JPL
670806	2014 AO_{35}	—	November 28, 2005	Mount Lemmon	Mount Lemmon Survey	·	1.1 km	MPC · JPL
670807	2014 AJ_{38}	—	October 11, 2012	Mount Lemmon	Mount Lemmon Survey	KOR	1.0 km	MPC · JPL
670808	2014 AF_{40}	—	November 5, 2005	Catalina	CSS	NYS	1.1 km	MPC · JPL
670809	2014 AF_{41}	—	August 13, 2012	Kitt Peak	Spacewatch	·	1.8 km	MPC · JPL
670810	2014 AP_{45}	—	January 9, 2014	Mount Lemmon	Mount Lemmon Survey	KOR	1.1 km	MPC · JPL
670811	2014 AY_{48}	—	February 25, 2011	Mount Lemmon	Mount Lemmon Survey	·	500 m	MPC · JPL
670812	2014 AT_{50}	—	January 10, 2014	Kitt Peak	Spacewatch	·	680 m	MPC · JPL
670813	2014 AY_{51}	—	January 13, 2014	Mount Lemmon	Mount Lemmon Survey	H	410 m	MPC · JPL
670814	2014 AW_{52}	—	September 4, 2008	Kitt Peak	Spacewatch	MAR	1.1 km	MPC · JPL
670815	2014 AN_{53}	—	December 4, 2013	Haleakala	Pan-STARRS 1	·	1.3 km	MPC · JPL
670816	2014 AP_{53}	—	January 4, 2014	Haleakala	Pan-STARRS 1	·	1.2 km	MPC · JPL
670817	2014 AM_{55}	—	January 5, 2014	Haleakala	Pan-STARRS 1	cubewano (hot)	437 km	MPC · JPL
670818	2014 AU_{55}	—	December 22, 2008	Mount Lemmon	Mount Lemmon Survey	·	2.6 km	MPC · JPL
670819	2014 AD_{58}	—	December 9, 2012	Nogales	M. Schwartz, P. R. Holvorcem	·	2.4 km	MPC · JPL
670820	2014 AM_{59}	—	October 1, 2003	Kitt Peak	Spacewatch	·	1.7 km	MPC · JPL
670821	2014 AP_{60}	—	August 4, 2005	Palomar	NEAT	·	1.3 km	MPC · JPL
670822	2014 AX_{61}	—	January 1, 2014	Haleakala	Pan-STARRS 1	·	1.4 km	MPC · JPL
670823	2014 AG_{62}	—	January 1, 2014	Kitt Peak	Spacewatch	·	560 m	MPC · JPL
670824	2014 AP_{65}	—	September 26, 2017	Haleakala	Pan-STARRS 1	·	1.9 km	MPC · JPL
670825	2014 AJ_{66}	—	January 1, 2014	Haleakala	Pan-STARRS 1	NAE	1.7 km	MPC · JPL
670826	2014 AQ_{67}	—	January 1, 2014	Haleakala	Pan-STARRS 1	·	1.2 km	MPC · JPL
670827	2014 AZ_{69}	—	January 3, 2014	Mount Lemmon	Mount Lemmon Survey	TIR	2.9 km	MPC · JPL
670828	2014 BM	—	December 21, 2005	Catalina	CSS	H	500 m	MPC · JPL
670829	2014 BU_{2}	—	November 6, 2013	Mount Lemmon	Mount Lemmon Survey	·	1.1 km	MPC · JPL
670830	2014 BD_{4}	—	January 20, 2014	Mount Lemmon	Mount Lemmon Survey	·	1.6 km	MPC · JPL
670831	2014 BW_{8}	—	January 21, 2014	Haleakala	Pan-STARRS 1	H	440 m	MPC · JPL
670832	2014 BD_{11}	—	January 21, 2014	Kitt Peak	Spacewatch	·	860 m	MPC · JPL
670833	2014 BF_{21}	—	December 16, 2007	Mount Lemmon	Mount Lemmon Survey	VER	2.1 km	MPC · JPL
670834	2014 BX_{21}	—	January 23, 2014	Mount Lemmon	Mount Lemmon Survey	·	900 m	MPC · JPL
670835	2014 BK_{29}	—	February 10, 2010	Kitt Peak	Spacewatch	·	1.1 km	MPC · JPL
670836	2014 BC_{32}	—	August 27, 2012	Haleakala	Pan-STARRS 1	·	1.1 km	MPC · JPL
670837	2014 BK_{33}	—	April 1, 2011	Catalina	CSS	·	740 m	MPC · JPL
670838	2014 BB_{34}	—	February 1, 2005	Kitt Peak	Spacewatch	PAD	1.8 km	MPC · JPL
670839	2014 BM_{35}	—	November 6, 2008	Mount Lemmon	Mount Lemmon Survey	·	1.7 km	MPC · JPL
670840	2014 BG_{38}	—	December 3, 2005	Mauna Kea	A. Boattini	·	1.2 km	MPC · JPL
670841	2014 BP_{42}	—	March 27, 2003	Kitt Peak	Spacewatch	·	1.2 km	MPC · JPL
670842	2014 BG_{43}	—	January 27, 2014	Elena Remote	Oreshko, A.	JUN	1.2 km	MPC · JPL
670843	2014 BK_{45}	—	November 23, 2008	Kitt Peak	Spacewatch	·	1.4 km	MPC · JPL
670844	2014 BM_{47}	—	October 24, 2005	Mauna Kea	A. Boattini	(5)	1.4 km	MPC · JPL
670845	2014 BF_{52}	—	October 27, 2003	Kitt Peak	Spacewatch	·	2.5 km	MPC · JPL
670846	2014 BD_{53}	—	December 31, 2013	Kitt Peak	Spacewatch	AGN	840 m	MPC · JPL
670847	2014 BE_{53}	—	December 30, 2013	Kitt Peak	Spacewatch	(5)	880 m	MPC · JPL
670848	2014 BJ_{54}	—	September 21, 2012	Kitt Peak	Spacewatch	·	1.5 km	MPC · JPL
670849	2014 BY_{54}	—	January 7, 2014	Mount Lemmon	Mount Lemmon Survey	·	2.8 km	MPC · JPL
670850	2014 BN_{55}	—	September 23, 2008	Mount Lemmon	Mount Lemmon Survey	·	1.1 km	MPC · JPL
670851	2014 BU_{62}	—	October 22, 2012	Piszkés-tető	K. Sárneczky, A. Király	·	1.9 km	MPC · JPL
670852	2014 BA_{63}	—	January 31, 2014	Haleakala	Pan-STARRS 1	·	1.4 km	MPC · JPL
670853	2014 BK_{67}	—	January 15, 2009	Kitt Peak	Spacewatch	·	1.6 km	MPC · JPL
670854	2014 BP_{67}	—	May 29, 2011	Mount Lemmon	Mount Lemmon Survey	·	1.2 km	MPC · JPL
670855	2014 BY_{67}	—	January 24, 2014	Haleakala	Pan-STARRS 1	KOR	1.1 km	MPC · JPL
670856	2014 BJ_{69}	—	January 20, 2009	Catalina	CSS	·	2.1 km	MPC · JPL
670857	2014 BD_{70}	—	January 21, 2014	Haleakala	Pan-STARRS 1	cubewano (hot)	401 km	MPC · JPL
670858	2014 BK_{70}	—	January 31, 2014	Haleakala	Pan-STARRS 1	·	1.7 km	MPC · JPL
670859	2014 BN_{70}	—	February 27, 2015	Haleakala	Pan-STARRS 1	MAR	860 m	MPC · JPL
670860	2014 BU_{70}	—	January 28, 2014	Mount Lemmon	Mount Lemmon Survey	·	1.6 km	MPC · JPL
670861	2014 BJ_{71}	—	January 20, 2014	Mount Lemmon	Mount Lemmon Survey	·	1.7 km	MPC · JPL
670862	2014 BS_{72}	—	January 26, 2014	Haleakala	Pan-STARRS 1	·	710 m	MPC · JPL
670863	2014 BG_{73}	—	January 23, 2014	Catalina	CSS	·	1.5 km	MPC · JPL
670864	2014 BN_{73}	—	January 3, 2014	Kitt Peak	Spacewatch	·	1.4 km	MPC · JPL
670865	2014 BU_{73}	—	January 3, 2014	Kitt Peak	Spacewatch	·	1.4 km	MPC · JPL
670866	2014 BC_{75}	—	September 29, 2017	Haleakala	Pan-STARRS 1	·	1.4 km	MPC · JPL
670867	2014 BW_{75}	—	January 28, 2014	Mount Lemmon	Mount Lemmon Survey	·	500 m	MPC · JPL
670868	2014 BE_{82}	—	January 25, 2014	Haleakala	Pan-STARRS 1	·	1.1 km	MPC · JPL
670869	2014 BU_{83}	—	January 28, 2014	Mount Lemmon	Mount Lemmon Survey	·	490 m	MPC · JPL
670870	2014 BP_{85}	—	August 5, 2011	ESA OGS	ESA OGS	·	2.1 km	MPC · JPL
670871	2014 BJ_{86}	—	January 28, 2014	Kitt Peak	Spacewatch	·	1.6 km	MPC · JPL
670872	2014 CM_{3}	—	January 6, 2014	Oukaïmeden	M. Ory	·	1.6 km	MPC · JPL
670873	2014 CO_{4}	—	January 7, 2014	Mount Lemmon	Mount Lemmon Survey	·	560 m	MPC · JPL
670874	2014 CT_{8}	—	January 21, 2014	Mount Lemmon	Mount Lemmon Survey	·	500 m	MPC · JPL
670875	2014 CJ_{11}	—	January 10, 2014	Kitt Peak	Spacewatch	·	1.5 km	MPC · JPL
670876	2014 CF_{12}	—	November 19, 2003	Kitt Peak	Spacewatch	GEF	1.3 km	MPC · JPL
670877	2014 CP_{16}	—	October 16, 2012	Alder Springs	Levin, K.	·	1.2 km	MPC · JPL
670878	2014 CP_{20}	—	January 28, 2014	Mayhill-ISON	L. Elenin	·	1.2 km	MPC · JPL
670879	2014 CU_{29}	—	January 29, 2014	Kitt Peak	Spacewatch	·	540 m	MPC · JPL
670880	2014 CA_{30}	—	February 10, 2014	Haleakala	Pan-STARRS 1	·	2.5 km	MPC · JPL
670881	2014 DJ	—	February 18, 2014	Mount Lemmon	Mount Lemmon Survey	·	600 m	MPC · JPL
670882	2014 DH_{1}	—	October 8, 2012	Haleakala	Pan-STARRS 1	T_{j} (2.95) · 3:2	5.4 km	MPC · JPL
670883	2014 DM_{1}	—	January 13, 2005	Kitt Peak	Spacewatch	·	2.1 km	MPC · JPL
670884	2014 DV_{2}	—	January 11, 2014	Mount Lemmon	Mount Lemmon Survey	H	570 m	MPC · JPL
670885	2014 DH_{3}	—	March 16, 2005	Mount Lemmon	Mount Lemmon Survey	HOF	2.2 km	MPC · JPL
670886	2014 DW_{3}	—	January 2, 2009	Mount Lemmon	Mount Lemmon Survey	·	1.8 km	MPC · JPL
670887	2014 DG_{7}	—	January 10, 2014	Mount Lemmon	Mount Lemmon Survey	H	520 m	MPC · JPL
670888	2014 DH_{13}	—	February 16, 2005	La Silla	A. Boattini	·	2.3 km	MPC · JPL
670889	2014 DP_{13}	—	March 11, 2005	Anderson Mesa	LONEOS	·	2.3 km	MPC · JPL
670890	2014 DV_{14}	—	January 29, 2014	Kitt Peak	Spacewatch	·	2.4 km	MPC · JPL
670891	2014 DD_{19}	—	June 30, 2005	Palomar	NEAT	·	2.7 km	MPC · JPL
670892	2014 DF_{22}	—	February 24, 2014	Haleakala	Pan-STARRS 1	H	340 m	MPC · JPL
670893	2014 DM_{24}	—	December 30, 2008	Mount Lemmon	Mount Lemmon Survey	·	1.6 km	MPC · JPL
670894	2014 DX_{25}	—	October 22, 2003	Apache Point	SDSS	·	1.8 km	MPC · JPL
670895	2014 DG_{27}	—	April 29, 2011	Mount Lemmon	Mount Lemmon Survey	·	550 m	MPC · JPL
670896	2014 DX_{32}	—	January 31, 2003	Kitt Peak	Spacewatch	·	2.3 km	MPC · JPL
670897	2014 DD_{41}	—	March 18, 2009	Mount Lemmon	Mount Lemmon Survey	TIR	2.6 km	MPC · JPL
670898	2014 DW_{41}	—	January 2, 2009	Kitt Peak	Spacewatch	·	1.9 km	MPC · JPL
670899	2014 DZ_{44}	—	October 21, 2007	Mount Lemmon	Mount Lemmon Survey	·	1.7 km	MPC · JPL
670900	2014 DT_{49}	—	February 28, 2003	Haleakala	NEAT	·	1.2 km	MPC · JPL

== 670901–671000 ==
back to top

Designation			Discovery			Properties		Ref
Permanent	Provisional	Named after	Date	Site	Discoverer(s)	Category	Diam.	Ref
670901	2014 DD_{50}	—	February 26, 2014	Haleakala	Pan-STARRS 1	·	1.7 km	MPC · JPL
670902	2014 DH_{51}	—	February 28, 2009	Kitt Peak	Spacewatch	·	1.7 km	MPC · JPL
670903	2014 DK_{51}	—	February 26, 2014	Haleakala	Pan-STARRS 1	·	3.4 km	MPC · JPL
670904	2014 DF_{52}	—	February 26, 2014	Haleakala	Pan-STARRS 1	EOS	1.6 km	MPC · JPL
670905	2014 DN_{60}	—	February 26, 2014	Haleakala	Pan-STARRS 1	·	1.4 km	MPC · JPL
670906	2014 DG_{61}	—	September 12, 2007	Catalina	CSS	NEM	2.2 km	MPC · JPL
670907	2014 DV_{61}	—	February 26, 2014	Haleakala	Pan-STARRS 1	·	1.4 km	MPC · JPL
670908	2014 DC_{63}	—	February 21, 2009	Kitt Peak	Spacewatch	·	2.1 km	MPC · JPL
670909	2014 DQ_{63}	—	February 26, 2014	Haleakala	Pan-STARRS 1	KOR	1.2 km	MPC · JPL
670910	2014 DA_{65}	—	February 26, 2014	Haleakala	Pan-STARRS 1	·	1.5 km	MPC · JPL
670911	2014 DL_{66}	—	September 25, 2011	Haleakala	Pan-STARRS 1	·	2.1 km	MPC · JPL
670912	2014 DA_{72}	—	February 26, 2014	Haleakala	Pan-STARRS 1	·	640 m	MPC · JPL
670913	2014 DO_{74}	—	February 26, 2014	Haleakala	Pan-STARRS 1	·	1.4 km	MPC · JPL
670914	2014 DW_{74}	—	February 26, 2014	Haleakala	Pan-STARRS 1	·	1.7 km	MPC · JPL
670915	2014 DC_{75}	—	November 12, 2007	Mount Lemmon	Mount Lemmon Survey	·	1.8 km	MPC · JPL
670916	2014 DB_{81}	—	February 21, 2014	Haleakala	Pan-STARRS 1	·	1.4 km	MPC · JPL
670917	2014 DC_{81}	—	October 7, 2007	Catalina	CSS	·	2.0 km	MPC · JPL
670918	2014 DL_{86}	—	March 3, 2009	Kitt Peak	Spacewatch	·	2.2 km	MPC · JPL
670919	2014 DF_{87}	—	November 7, 2008	Mount Lemmon	Mount Lemmon Survey	·	1.2 km	MPC · JPL
670920	2014 DM_{93}	—	September 26, 2003	Apache Point	SDSS Collaboration	·	1.4 km	MPC · JPL
670921	2014 DJ_{94}	—	March 19, 2009	Kitt Peak	Spacewatch	·	2.1 km	MPC · JPL
670922	2014 DT_{95}	—	November 2, 2007	Kitt Peak	Spacewatch	·	2.3 km	MPC · JPL
670923	2014 DB_{97}	—	February 26, 2014	Haleakala	Pan-STARRS 1	·	1.5 km	MPC · JPL
670924	2014 DE_{98}	—	February 27, 2014	Kitt Peak	Spacewatch	EOS	1.6 km	MPC · JPL
670925	2014 DQ_{98}	—	November 6, 2012	Haleakala	Pan-STARRS 1	·	1.3 km	MPC · JPL
670926	2014 DU_{100}	—	March 11, 2005	Mount Lemmon	Mount Lemmon Survey	·	1.7 km	MPC · JPL
670927	2014 DE_{104}	—	February 9, 2005	Mount Lemmon	Mount Lemmon Survey	·	1.7 km	MPC · JPL
670928	2014 DJ_{104}	—	February 27, 2014	Mount Lemmon	Mount Lemmon Survey	·	550 m	MPC · JPL
670929	2014 DN_{106}	—	September 23, 2011	Haleakala	Pan-STARRS 1	·	1.2 km	MPC · JPL
670930	2014 DM_{109}	—	February 27, 2014	Mount Lemmon	Mount Lemmon Survey	EUN	1.1 km	MPC · JPL
670931	2014 DJ_{112}	—	February 28, 2014	Haleakala	Pan-STARRS 1	APO	340 m	MPC · JPL
670932	2014 DU_{115}	—	February 26, 2014	Kitt Peak	Spacewatch	H	400 m	MPC · JPL
670933	2014 DO_{116}	—	August 26, 1998	Kitt Peak	Spacewatch	·	2.0 km	MPC · JPL
670934	2014 DD_{130}	—	October 6, 2005	Kitt Peak	Spacewatch	·	540 m	MPC · JPL
670935	2014 DN_{130}	—	February 28, 2014	Haleakala	Pan-STARRS 1	·	800 m	MPC · JPL
670936	2014 DF_{131}	—	November 3, 2007	Kitt Peak	Spacewatch	KOR	1.3 km	MPC · JPL
670937	2014 DZ_{133}	—	November 18, 2007	Kitt Peak	Spacewatch	·	1.5 km	MPC · JPL
670938	2014 DP_{135}	—	February 28, 2014	Haleakala	Pan-STARRS 1	·	1.6 km	MPC · JPL
670939	2014 DY_{136}	—	February 28, 2014	Haleakala	Pan-STARRS 1	KOR	1.2 km	MPC · JPL
670940	2014 DV_{138}	—	October 26, 2009	Mount Lemmon	Mount Lemmon Survey	·	500 m	MPC · JPL
670941	2014 DP_{140}	—	February 22, 2014	Kitt Peak	Spacewatch	·	560 m	MPC · JPL
670942	2014 DY_{140}	—	February 28, 2014	Haleakala	Pan-STARRS 1	·	560 m	MPC · JPL
670943	2014 DJ_{144}	—	February 28, 2014	Haleakala	Pan-STARRS 1	H	400 m	MPC · JPL
670944	2014 DO_{145}	—	February 28, 2014	Haleakala	Pan-STARRS 1	·	1.8 km	MPC · JPL
670945	2014 DO_{148}	—	August 23, 2011	Haleakala	Pan-STARRS 1	KOR	1.4 km	MPC · JPL
670946	2014 DS_{148}	—	October 24, 2011	Haleakala	Pan-STARRS 1	·	2.5 km	MPC · JPL
670947	2014 DH_{149}	—	September 30, 2003	Kitt Peak	Spacewatch	·	1.7 km	MPC · JPL
670948	2014 DT_{150}	—	February 26, 2014	Mount Lemmon	Mount Lemmon Survey	·	2.1 km	MPC · JPL
670949	2014 DJ_{151}	—	December 3, 2005	Mauna Kea	A. Boattini	·	930 m	MPC · JPL
670950	2014 DF_{152}	—	February 26, 2014	Haleakala	Pan-STARRS 1	·	590 m	MPC · JPL
670951	2014 DS_{154}	—	January 18, 2004	Catalina	CSS	GEF	1.4 km	MPC · JPL
670952	2014 DH_{156}	—	August 14, 2016	Haleakala	Pan-STARRS 1	·	2.0 km	MPC · JPL
670953	2014 DX_{156}	—	February 26, 2014	Haleakala	Pan-STARRS 1	·	1.4 km	MPC · JPL
670954	2014 DO_{157}	—	February 26, 2014	Mount Lemmon	Mount Lemmon Survey	·	1.3 km	MPC · JPL
670955	2014 DC_{158}	—	February 26, 2014	Haleakala	Pan-STARRS 1	·	2.3 km	MPC · JPL
670956	2014 DR_{159}	—	February 19, 2014	Mount Lemmon	Mount Lemmon Survey	·	820 m	MPC · JPL
670957	2014 DX_{161}	—	February 28, 2014	Haleakala	Pan-STARRS 1	·	1.8 km	MPC · JPL
670958	2014 DJ_{165}	—	August 3, 2016	Haleakala	Pan-STARRS 1	·	1.5 km	MPC · JPL
670959	2014 DE_{166}	—	February 26, 2014	Mount Lemmon	Mount Lemmon Survey	·	1.9 km	MPC · JPL
670960	2014 DZ_{166}	—	February 28, 2014	Haleakala	Pan-STARRS 1	·	520 m	MPC · JPL
670961	2014 DB_{169}	—	February 26, 2014	Mount Lemmon	Mount Lemmon Survey	L4	6.3 km	MPC · JPL
670962	2014 DN_{172}	—	February 26, 2014	Haleakala	Pan-STARRS 1	·	530 m	MPC · JPL
670963	2014 DR_{173}	—	February 26, 2014	Haleakala	Pan-STARRS 1	·	1.7 km	MPC · JPL
670964	2014 DO_{175}	—	February 26, 2014	Haleakala	Pan-STARRS 1	H	380 m	MPC · JPL
670965	2014 DJ_{177}	—	February 25, 2014	Kitt Peak	Spacewatch	L4	8.2 km	MPC · JPL
670966	2014 DQ_{177}	—	February 26, 2014	Haleakala	Pan-STARRS 1	L4	8.1 km	MPC · JPL
670967	2014 DF_{182}	—	February 19, 2014	Mount Lemmon	Mount Lemmon Survey	·	730 m	MPC · JPL
670968	2014 DN_{183}	—	February 26, 2014	Haleakala	Pan-STARRS 1	·	500 m	MPC · JPL
670969	2014 DA_{184}	—	December 6, 2012	Mount Lemmon	Mount Lemmon Survey	·	1.5 km	MPC · JPL
670970	2014 DW_{184}	—	June 3, 2011	Mount Lemmon	Mount Lemmon Survey	·	660 m	MPC · JPL
670971	2014 DB_{185}	—	February 26, 2014	Mount Lemmon	Mount Lemmon Survey	·	1.8 km	MPC · JPL
670972	2014 DV_{185}	—	February 28, 2014	Haleakala	Pan-STARRS 1	·	1.7 km	MPC · JPL
670973	2014 DH_{186}	—	February 28, 2014	Haleakala	Pan-STARRS 1	EOS	1.2 km	MPC · JPL
670974	2014 DJ_{187}	—	February 27, 2014	Haleakala	Pan-STARRS 1	·	1.7 km	MPC · JPL
670975	2014 DB_{188}	—	February 28, 2014	Haleakala	Pan-STARRS 1	·	1.7 km	MPC · JPL
670976	2014 DB_{194}	—	December 8, 2012	Mount Lemmon	Mount Lemmon Survey	L4	5.5 km	MPC · JPL
670977	2014 EN_{2}	—	September 26, 2003	Apache Point	SDSS Collaboration	·	1.5 km	MPC · JPL
670978	2014 ER_{2}	—	November 7, 2008	Mount Lemmon	Mount Lemmon Survey	·	1.3 km	MPC · JPL
670979	2014 ET_{3}	—	February 22, 2014	Kitt Peak	Spacewatch	L4	7.7 km	MPC · JPL
670980	2014 EH_{6}	—	September 23, 2011	Kitt Peak	Spacewatch	·	2.2 km	MPC · JPL
670981	2014 EC_{7}	—	March 13, 2007	Kitt Peak	Spacewatch	NYS	990 m	MPC · JPL
670982	2014 EU_{7}	—	February 27, 2014	Haleakala	Pan-STARRS 1	·	1.7 km	MPC · JPL
670983	2014 EW_{10}	—	March 7, 2014	Kitt Peak	Spacewatch	·	2.3 km	MPC · JPL
670984	2014 EH_{12}	—	November 27, 2011	Les Engarouines	L. Bernasconi	L4	9.5 km	MPC · JPL
670985	2014 EB_{14}	—	October 25, 2012	Mount Lemmon	Mount Lemmon Survey	·	1.5 km	MPC · JPL
670986	2014 EL_{17}	—	October 21, 2012	Haleakala	Pan-STARRS 1	·	1.7 km	MPC · JPL
670987	2014 EA_{20}	—	March 6, 2014	Kitt Peak	Spacewatch	·	1.5 km	MPC · JPL
670988	2014 EA_{23}	—	July 28, 2011	Haleakala	Pan-STARRS 1	PAD	1.4 km	MPC · JPL
670989	2014 ER_{25}	—	March 1, 2005	Goodricke-Pigott	R. A. Tucker	·	2.1 km	MPC · JPL
670990	2014 EW_{30}	—	February 26, 2014	Haleakala	Pan-STARRS 1	·	530 m	MPC · JPL
670991	2014 EX_{32}	—	February 26, 2014	Haleakala	Pan-STARRS 1	·	1.3 km	MPC · JPL
670992	2014 EP_{34}	—	September 19, 2009	Catalina	CSS	L4	9.5 km	MPC · JPL
670993	2014 EZ_{36}	—	April 12, 2010	Mount Lemmon	Mount Lemmon Survey	·	1.7 km	MPC · JPL
670994	2014 EB_{37}	—	March 8, 2014	Mount Lemmon	Mount Lemmon Survey	V	540 m	MPC · JPL
670995	2014 EN_{37}	—	March 8, 2014	Mount Lemmon	Mount Lemmon Survey	·	1.6 km	MPC · JPL
670996	2014 EO_{40}	—	February 10, 2014	Haleakala	Pan-STARRS 1	·	1.3 km	MPC · JPL
670997	2014 EQ_{46}	—	March 21, 2004	Kitt Peak	Spacewatch	·	520 m	MPC · JPL
670998	2014 EY_{47}	—	March 11, 2014	Mount Lemmon	Mount Lemmon Survey	·	660 m	MPC · JPL
670999	2014 EP_{48}	—	March 12, 2014	Mount Lemmon	Mount Lemmon Survey	H	440 m	MPC · JPL
671000	2014 EG_{49}	—	May 25, 2006	Kitt Peak	Spacewatch	·	1.1 km	MPC · JPL

back to top

== Meaning of names ==
As minor planet discoveries are confirmed, they are given a permanent number by the IAU's Minor Planet Center (MPC), and the discoverers can then submit names for them, following the IAU's naming conventions. The list below concerns those minor planets in the specified number-range that have received names, and explains the meanings of those names.

Official naming citations of newly named small Solar System bodies are approved and published in a bulletin by IAU's Working Group for Small Bodies Nomenclature (WGSBN). Before May 2021, citations were published in MPC's Minor Planet Circulars for many decades. Recent citations can also be found on the JPL Small-Body Database (SBDB). Until his death in 2016, German astronomer Lutz D. Schmadel compiled these citations into the Dictionary of Minor Planet Names (DMP) and regularly updated the collection.

Based on Paul Herget's The Names of the Minor Planets, Schmadel also researched the unclear origin of numerous asteroids, most of which had been named prior to World War II. This article incorporates text from this source, which is in the public domain: SBDB New namings may only be added to this list below after official publication as the preannouncement of names is condemned. The WGSBN publishes a comprehensive guideline for the naming rules of non-cometary small Solar System bodies.

Named minor planet	Provisional	This minor planet was named for...	Ref · Catalog
670740 Mihailsandu	2013 YA_{48}	Mihail Sandu (b. 1946), a Romanian high school professor.	IAU · 670740
670744 Karsh	2013 YS_{58}	Yousuf (1908–2002) and Malak (1915–2001) Karsh, Armenian photographers.	IAU · 670744
