= 3 Vulpeculae =

Star in the constellation Vulpecula

- Location of 3 Vulpeculae (circled in red)

Observation data Epoch J2000.0 Equinox ICRS
- Constellation: Vulpecula
- Right ascension: 19^{h} 22^{m} 50.8856^{s}
- Declination: +26° 15′ 44.667″
- Apparent magnitude (V): 5.18

Characteristics
- Evolutionary stage: main sequence
- Spectral type: B7V
- B−V color index: −0.119±0.001
- Variable type: SPB

Astrometry
| Radial velocity (R_{v}) | −14.1±1.1 km/s |
| Proper motion (μ) | RA: 0.922(124) mas/yr Dec.: −10.270(163) mas/yr |
| Parallax (π) | 8.9071±0.1685 mas |
| Distance | 366 ± 7 ly (112 ± 2 pc) |
| Absolute magnitude (M_{V}) | −0.17 |

Orbit
| Period (P) | 367.7 days |
| Eccentricity (e) | 0.15 |
| Semi-amplitude (K_{1}) (primary) | 6.8 km/s |

Details

A
| Mass | 4.16 M_{☉} |
| Luminosity | 286+64 −52 L_{☉} |
| Surface gravity (log g) | 4.30 cgs |
| Temperature | 14,343 K |
| Rotational velocity (v sin i) | 15.5 km/s |

B
| Mass | 0.6 - 1.1 M_{☉} |
| Age | 25 Myr |

Other designations
- 3 Vul, V377 Vulpeculae, BD+25°3811, GC 26748, HD 182255, HIP 95260, HR 7358, SAO 87136

Database references
| SIMBAD | data |

3 Vulpeculae (abbreviated 3 Vul) is a binary star system in the northern constellation of Vulpecula, located around 366 light years away from the Sun. 3 Vulpeculae is its Flamsteed designation. It is visible to the naked eye as a faint, blue-white hued star with a baseline apparent visual magnitude of 5.18.

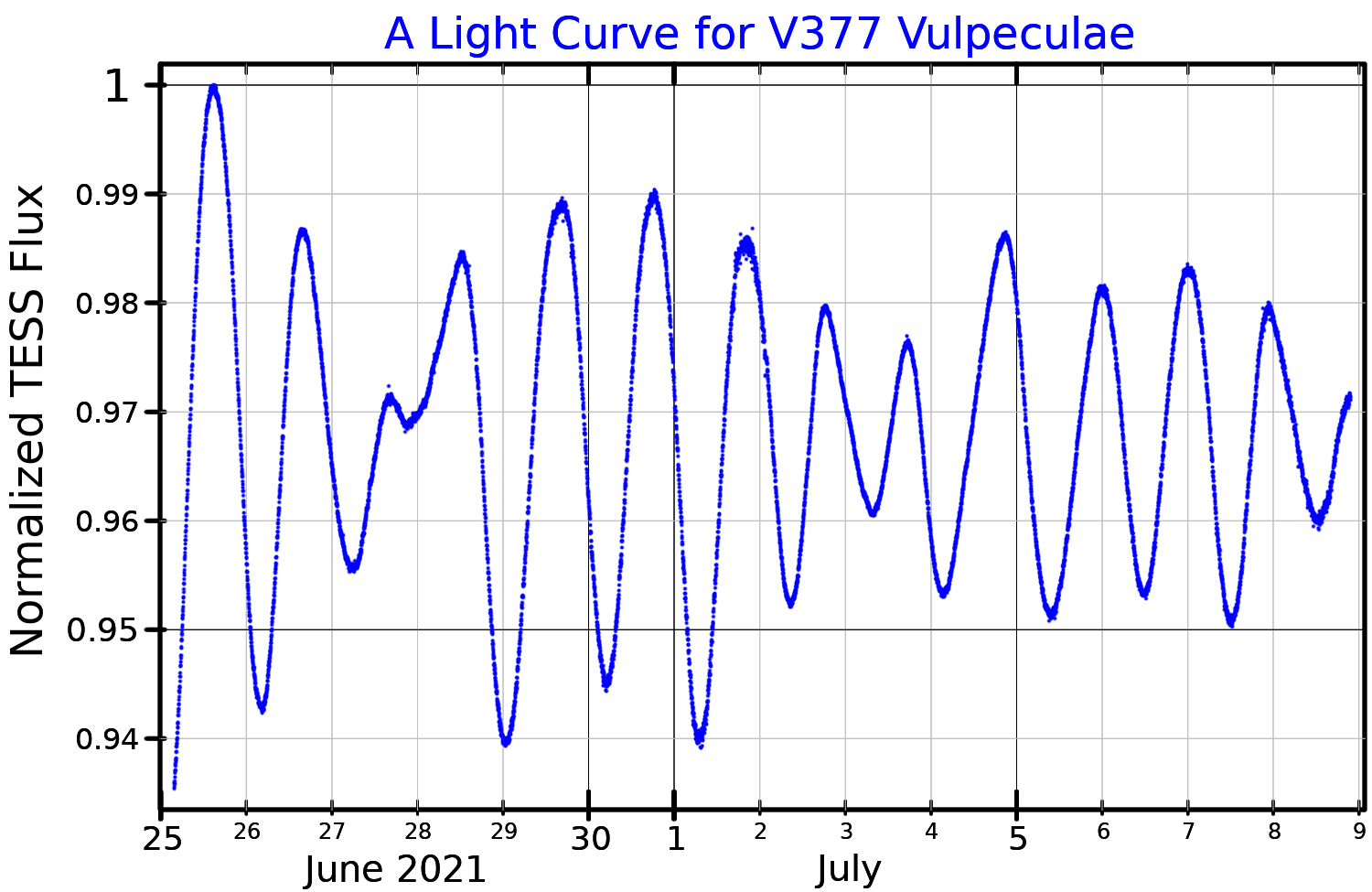
A light curve for V377 Vulpeculae, plotted from TESS data

In 1991 Douglas Hube and Christopher Aikman announced their discovery that 3 Vul's brightness varies. The star has been nicknamed "the Observer's Nightmare" (or its Latin free translation, "Spectatori Error Inextricabilis") by some astronomers because it is difficult to study as its orbital period is close to a year, and additionally it is pulsating with a period close to a day. From a twenty-year spectroscopic study, Hube and Aikman established a 367-day orbital period, and noted the presence of non-radial pulsations in the primary star. From sparse photometry, the authors also established the star's light variability. They suggested that the primary is a member of the 53 Persei class of variable stars. Such stars are now collectively known by the term slowly pulsating B-type stars. Its photometric variation led to a variable star designation, as V377 Vulpeculae, but the non-reproducibility of the light curve made determination of the pulsation period elusive.

Continuous monitoring of the star by the Transiting Exoplanet Survey Satellite has revealed a beat-period phenomenon in the light curve, which causes the luminosity variations to fluctuate in amplitude. The pulsations are non-radial, that is, the star's photosphere varies in shape rather than volume; different parts of the star are expanding and contracting simultaneously. These gravity waves, or g-mode waves, can be indicative of the interior structure of the star.

The primary member, designated component A, is a most likely a B-type main-sequence star with a stellar classification of B7V. The star has 4.16 times the mass of the Sun and is radiating 286 times the Sun's luminosity from its photosphere at an effective temperature of 14,343 K. The secondary has an estimated 0.6–1.1 solar masses.
