= List of stars in Vulpecula =

This is the list of notable stars in the constellation Vulpecula, sorted by decreasing brightness.

Name	B	F	Var	HD	HIP	RA	Dec	vis. mag.	abs. mag.	Dist. (ly)	Sp. class	Notes
α Vul	α	6		183439	95771	19^{h} 28^{m} 42.33^{s}	+24° 39′ 53.7″	4.40	−0.36	291	M1III	Anser; suspected variable, V_{max} = 4.39^{m}, V_{min} = 4.46^{m}
23 Vul		23		192806	99874	20^{h} 15^{m} 46.14^{s}	+27° 48′ 51.1″	4.52	−0.58	327	K3- III Fe-1	
31 Vul	(r)	31		198809	103004	20^{h} 52^{m} 07.68^{s}	+27° 05′ 49.0″	4.56	0.77	228	G7IIIa Fe-1 Ba	
13 Vul		13		188260	97886	19^{h} 53^{m} 27.68^{s}	+24° 04′ 46.3″	4.57	−0.64	359	B9.5III	
15 Vul		15	NT	189849	98543	20^{h} 01^{m} 06.01^{s}	+27° 45′ 12.8″	4.66	0.49	222	A4III	α² CVn variable, V_{max} = 4.62^{m}, V_{min} = 4.67^{m}, P = 14 d
1 Vul		1		180554	94703	19^{h} 16^{m} 13.04^{s}	+21° 23′ 25.6″	4.76	−2.47	911	B4IV	suspected variable, V_{max} = 4.57^{m}, V_{min} = 4.77^{m}
HR 7739			QR	192685	99824	20^{h} 15^{m} 15.89^{s}	+25° 35′ 31.1″	4.79	−3.04	1199	B3V	γ Cas variable, V_{max} = 4.6^{m}, V_{min} = 4.8^{m}
29 Vul		29		196724	101867	20^{h} 38^{m} 31.29^{s}	+21° 12′ 04.2″	4.81	0.73	213	A0V	
12 Vul		12	V395	187811	97679	19^{h} 51^{m} 04.09^{s}	+22° 36′ 36.3″	4.90	−1.49	619	B2.5V	Be star, V_{max} = 4.78^{m}, V_{min} = 4.97^{m}
30 Vul		30		197752	102388	20^{h} 44^{m} 52.52^{s}	+25° 16′ 15.8″	4.92	−0.32	365	K2III	
9 Vul		9		184606	96275	19^{h} 34^{m} 34.89^{s}	+19° 46′ 24.2″	5.00	−1.35	608	B8IIIn	suspected variable, V_{max} = 4.99^{m}, V_{min} = 5.08^{m}
32 Vul	(q)	32		199169	103200	20^{h} 54^{m} 33.64^{s}	+28° 03′ 27.5″	5.03	−1.75	739	K4III	suspected variable, V_{max} = 4.99^{m}, V_{min} = 5.06^{m}
28 Vul		28		196740	101868	20^{h} 38^{m} 31.91^{s}	+24° 06′ 57.5″	5.06	−0.84	493	B5IV	
17 Vul		17		190993	99080	20^{h} 06^{m} 53.40^{s}	+23° 36′ 51.9″	5.08	−0.80	488	B3V	
4 Vul		4		182762	95498	19^{h} 25^{m} 28.54^{s}	+19° 47′ 54.7″	5.14	0.84	237	K0III	
22 Vul		22	QS	192713	99853	20^{h} 15^{m} 30.24^{s}	+23° 30′ 32.1″	5.15	−5.44	4347	G2Ib SB	Algol variable, ΔV = 0.12^{m}, P = 249.083 d
3 Vul		3	V377	182255	95260	19^{h} 22^{m} 50.88^{s}	+26° 15′ 44.7″	5.18	−0.24	402	B6III	53 Persei variable, ΔV = 0.03^{m}, P = 1.26239 d
21 Vul		21	NU	192518	99738	20^{h} 14^{m} 14.52^{s}	+28° 41′ 41.5″	5.19	0.18	327	A7IVn	δ Sct variable
16 Vul		16		190004	98636	20^{h} 02^{m} 01.37^{s}	+24° 56′ 16.3″	5.23	1.17	211	F2III	
24 Vul		24		192944	99951	20^{h} 16^{m} 47.08^{s}	+24° 40′ 16.1″	5.30	−0.50	472	G8III	
33 Vul		33		199697	103511	20^{h} 58^{m} 16.35^{s}	+22° 19′ 33.3″	5.30	−0.13	397	K4III	
35 Vul		35		204414	105966	21^{h} 27^{m} 40.03^{s}	+27° 36′ 30.8″	5.39	1.66	182	A1V	
2 Vul		2	ES	180968	94827	19^{h} 17^{m} 43.64^{s}	+23° 01′ 32.0″	5.42	−3.39	1918	B0.5IV	β Cep variable, ΔV = 0.06^{m}, P = 0.6096 d
10 Vul		10		186486	97077	19^{h} 43^{m} 42.92^{s}	+25° 46′ 18.7″	5.50	0.31	356	G8III	
25 Vul		25		193911	100435	20^{h} 22^{m} 03.43^{s}	+24° 26′ 46.0″	5.50	−3.21	1801	B8IIIn	suspected variable, V_{max} = 5.51^{m}, V_{min} = 5.54^{m}
19 Vul		19		192004	99518	20^{h} 11^{m} 47.97^{s}	+26° 48′ 32.5″	5.51	−2.96	1614	K3II-III	
18 Vul		18		191747	99404	20^{h} 10^{m} 33.52^{s}	+26° 54′ 14.9″	5.53	−0.04	420	A3III	δ Sct variable, V_{max} = 5.52^{m}, V_{min} = 5.53^{m}
HD 187982				187982	97765	19^{h} 52^{m} 01.59^{s}	+24° 59′ 31.8″	5.54	−3.15	1781	A1Iab	suspected variable, V_{max} = 5.52^{m}, V_{min} = 5.58^{m}
HD 188485				188485	97961	19^{h} 54^{m} 31.06^{s}	+24° 19′ 09.8″	5.56	−0.25	472	A0III	variable star, ΔV = 0.005^{m}, P = 0.31928 d
27 Vul		27		196504	101716	20^{h} 37^{m} 04.66^{s}	+26° 27′ 43.1″	5.59	0.73	305	B9V	
5 Vul		5		182919	95560	19^{h} 26^{m} 13.24^{s}	+20° 05′ 52.2″	5.60	1.47	218	A0V	
T Vul			T	198726	102949	20^{h} 51^{m} 28.24^{s}	+28° 15′ 01.9″	5.66	−2.89	1672	F5Ib	classical Cepheid, V_{max} = 5.41^{m}, V_{min} = 6.09^{m}, P = 4.435462 d
HD 194577				194577	100754	20^{h} 25^{m} 40.52^{s}	+21° 24′ 34.8″	5.66	−0.43	543	G6III	suspected variable, ΔV = 0.04^{m}
HD 203925				203925	105703	21^{h} 24^{m} 33.97^{s}	+26° 10′ 28.4″	5.67	1.53	220	A8III	
14 Vul		14		189410	98375	19^{h} 59^{m} 10.58^{s}	+23° 06′ 04.6″	5.68	2.26	158	F0	
HD 203803				203803	105652	21^{h} 23^{m} 58.74^{s}	+24° 16′ 26.7″	5.70	1.98	181	F1IV	
HD 178187				178187	93845	19^{h} 06^{m} 38.36^{s}	+24° 15′ 02.7″	5.78	0.74	332	A4III	
8 Vul		8		183491	95785	19^{h} 28^{m} 57.08^{s}	+24° 46′ 07.3″	5.82	−0.04	484	K0III	suspected variable
HD 182955				182955	95582	19^{h} 26^{m} 28.69^{s}	+19° 53′ 29.8″	5.85	0.12	455	M0III	slow irregular variable, ΔV = 0.01^{m}
HD 189944				189944	98609	20^{h} 01^{m} 44.71^{s}	+24° 48′ 01.5″	5.88	−0.69	672	B4V	
HD 184010				184010	96016	19^{h} 31^{m} 21.61^{s}	+26° 37′ 01.6″	5.89	2.03	193	K0III-IV	suspected variable
20 Vul		20		192044	99531	20^{h} 12^{m} 00.70^{s}	+26° 28′ 43.8″	5.91	−1.81	1140	B7Ve...	variable star, V_{max} = 5.87^{m}, V_{min} = 5.92^{m}
HD 196753				196753	101870	20^{h} 38^{m} 34.99^{s}	+23° 40′ 49.8″	5.91	−3.00	1976	K0II-III+..	
HD 187193				187193	97402	19^{h} 47^{m} 48.50^{s}	+25° 23′ 02.8″	6.00	0.56	400	K0II-III	
HD 179648				179648	94382	19^{h} 12^{m} 36.72^{s}	+21° 33′ 16.4″	6.02	−1.43	1006	A2Vn	
HD 196821				196821	101919	20^{h} 39^{m} 10.63^{s}	+21° 49′ 02.7″	6.08	−1.19	926	A0III	suspected variable
HD 201051				201051	104172	21^{h} 06^{m} 23.45^{s}	+26° 55′ 27.9″	6.13	0.99	348	K0II-III	
3 Cyg		(3)		182807	95492	19^{h} 25^{m} 25.87^{s}	+24° 54′ 51.5″	6.19	3.97	90	F7V	
HD 203858				203858	105660	21^{h} 24^{m} 07.42^{s}	+25° 18′ 44.6″	6.20	−0.17	612	A2V	
HD 178476				178476	93975	19^{h} 08^{m} 03.49^{s}	+21° 41′ 55.5″	6.22	3.01	143	F3V	
HD 191877				191877	99479	20^{h} 11^{m} 21.02^{s}	+21° 52′ 29.9″	6.24	−8.55	6200	B1Ib	
HD 193094				193094	100018	20^{h} 17^{m} 31.54^{s}	+29° 08′ 51.0″	6.24	0.98	367	G9III	
PS Vul			PS	186518	97091	19^{h} 43^{m} 55.97^{s}	+27° 08′ 07.5″	6.28	−4.35	4347	B7V + G1:III	Algol variable, V_{max} = 6.28^{m}, V_{min} = 6.35^{m}, P = 3.8173 d
V387 Vul			V387	176541	93270	18^{h} 59^{m} 58.12^{s}	+22° 48′ 52.2″	6.28	−0.55	756	M4III	semiregular variable
HD 203206				203206	105344	21^{h} 20^{m} 14.07^{s}	+22° 01′ 34.2″	6.29	0.20	539	B6IV	suspected variable
HR 7556			V379	187640	97572	19^{h} 49^{m} 54.72^{s}	+28° 26′ 22.8″	6.29	−2.13	1698	B5V	rotating ellipsoidal variable, V_{max} = 6.22^{m}, V_{min} = 6.29^{m}
HD 182761				182761	95487	19^{h} 25^{m} 22.40^{s}	+20° 16′ 18.4″	6.31	0.87	400	A0V	
HD 184961				184961	96417	19^{h} 36^{m} 08.35^{s}	+22° 35′ 08.8″	6.33	0.11	571	B9sp...	suspected variable
7 Vul		7		183537	95818	19^{h} 29^{m} 20.90^{s}	+20° 16′ 47.2″	6.34	−0.50	760	B5Vn	variable star, ΔV = 0.009^{m}, P = 0.55923 d
HD 203886				203886	105689	21^{h} 24^{m} 23.11^{s}	+24° 31′ 42.3″	6.35	0.39	508	K0III	
HD 195692				195692	101300	20^{h} 31^{m} 58.19^{s}	+25° 48′ 18.1″	6.37	1.82	264	Am	
HD 182422				182422	95340	19^{h} 23^{m} 46.93^{s}	+20° 15′ 51.7″	6.40	−1.30	1132	B9.5V	
26 Vul		26		196362	101641	20^{h} 36^{m} 08.32^{s}	+25° 52′ 57.4″	6.40	−0.26	701	A5III	
HD 186021				186021	96856	19^{h} 41^{m} 14.65^{s}	+22° 27′ 10.0″	6.43	−1.80	1442	K0Iab:	
HD 176971				176971	93443	19^{h} 01^{m} 49.42^{s}	+22° 15′ 51.8″	6.44	0.92	414	A4V	
HD 190322				190322	98772	20^{h} 03^{m} 38.81^{s}	+22° 56′ 27.9″	6.45	0.46	513	K2	
HD 187614				187614	97573	19^{h} 49^{m} 55.81^{s}	+27° 05′ 06.6″	6.46	0.64	475	G8III	
HD 189671				189671	98458	20^{h} 00^{m} 15.36^{s}	+26° 11′ 16.5″	6.49	−1.79	1475	G8II	
HD 196035				196035	101505	20^{h} 34^{m} 09.98^{s}	+20° 59′ 06.7″	6.49	−1.79	1475	B3IV	
HD 185436				185436	96601	19^{h} 38^{m} 17.79^{s}	+20° 47′ 00.5″	6.50	0.28	572	K0III	
HD 190066				190066	98661	20^{h} 02^{m} 22.11^{s}	+22° 09′ 05.4″	6.50	−3.75	3663	B1Iab	
BW Vul			BW	199140	103191	20^{h} 54^{m} 22.39^{s}	+28° 31′ 19.2″	6.54	−2.13	1772	B2IIIvar	β Cep variable, V_{max} = 6.44^{m}, V_{min} = 6.68^{m}, P = 0.20104117 d
HR 7222			LT	177392	93603	19^{h} 03^{m} 42.48^{s}	+21° 16′ 06.1″	6.62		373	F2III	δ Sct variable, V_{max} = 6.52^{m}, V_{min} = 6.62^{m}, P = 0.109 d
HD 192913			MW	192913	99927	20^{h} 16^{m} 27.20^{s}	+27° 46′ 33.9″	6.64		1610	A0p	α^{2} CVn variable, V_{max} = 6.62^{m}, V_{min} = 6.7^{m}, P = 16.846 d
SV Vul			SV	187921	97717	19^{h} 51^{m} 03.91^{s}	+27° 27′ 36.8″	6.74		4100	G2.5:Iab	classical Cepheid, V_{max} = 6.72^{m}, V_{min} = 7.79^{m}, P = 44.993 d
RS Vul			RS	180939	94822	19^{h} 17^{m} 39.99^{s}	+22° 26′ 28.4″	6.85		939	B5V+G0III-IV	Algol variable, V_{max} = 6.79^{m}, V_{min} = 7.83^{m}, P = 4.4776635 d
HIP 100963				195034	100963	20^{h} 28^{m} 11.81^{s}	+22° 07′ 44.4″	7.09		92.04	G5	solar twin
U Vul			U	185059	96458	19^{h} 36^{m} 37.73^{s}	+20° 19′ 58.6″	7.15		4900	F5:Iabv	classical Cepheid, V_{max} = 6.73^{m}, V_{min} = 7.54^{m}, P = 7.990676 d
HD 190228				190228	98714	20^{h} 03^{m} 00.77^{s}	+28° 18′ 24.7″	7.31	3.34	203	G5IV	has a planet (b)
Z Vul			Z	181987	95163	19^{h} 21^{m} 39.11^{s}	+25° 34′ 29.4″	7.33		626	B2V+B9V	classical Cepheid, V_{max} = 7.25^{m}, V_{min} = 8.9^{m}, P = 2.454934 d
ER Vul			ER	200391	103833	21^{h} 02^{m} 25.91^{s}	+27° 48′ 26.4″	7.37		169.5	G0V+G5V	W UMa variable, V_{max} = 7.27^{m}, V_{min} = 7.49^{m}, P = 0.69809409 d
HD 189733			V452	189733	98505	20^{h} 00^{m} 43.71^{s}	+22° 42′ 39.1″	7.67	6.26	62.9	K1-K2	planetary transit and BY Dra variable, ΔV = 0.03^{m}, P = 2.218573 d, has a transiting planet (b)
HD 188037			NS	188037		19^{h} 52^{m} 30.08^{s}	+22° 27′ 14.4″	7.76			A2	slow irregular variable, V_{max} = 7.75^{m}, V_{min} = 8.12^{m}
V Vul			V	340667		20^{h} 36^{m} 32.02^{s}	+26° 36′ 14.5″	8.05			G8:Iabv	RV Tau variable, V_{max} = 8.05^{m}, V_{min} = 9.75^{m}, P = 76.07 d
HD 201626				201626	104486	21^{h} 09^{m} 59.27^{s}	+26° 36′ 54.9″	8.16		738	C-H2IV: C2 3.5 CH5 CN2.5	CH star
HD 188015				188015	97769	19^{h} 52^{m} 04.54^{s}	+28° 06′ 01.4″	8.22	4.61	172	G5IV	has a planet (b)
HD 203030			V457	203030	105232	21^{h} 18^{m} 58.22^{s}	+26° 13′ 50.0″	8.45		133.3	G8V	BY Dra variable, ΔV = 0.04^{m}, P = 6.664 d, has a planet (b)
S Vul			S	338867		19^{h} 48^{m} 23.81^{s}	+27° 17′ 11.4″	8.69			K0	classical Cepheid, V_{max} = 8.69^{m}, V_{min} = 9.42^{m}, P = 68.464 d
DR Vul			DR	339770		20^{h} 13^{m} 46.85^{s}	+26° 45′ 01.6″	8.71			B8	Algol variable, V_{max} = 8.65^{m}, V_{min} = 9.27^{m}, P = 2.2508645 d
X Vul			X	339279	98212	19^{h} 57^{m} 28.61^{s}	+26° 33′ 23.3″	8.87		23000	K5	classical Cepheid, V_{max} = 8.33^{m}, V_{min} = 9.22^{m}, P = 6.319588 d
BD+23 3912				345957	99423	20^{h} 10^{m} 48.16^{s}	+23° 57′ 54.5″	8.93		315.9	G0V:	halo star
BE Vul			BE	340201		20^{h} 25^{m} 33.64^{s}	+27° 22′ 09.1″	9.79			A0	Algol variable, V_{max} = 9.78^{m}, V_{min} = 11.31^{m}, P = 1.552044 d
BP Vul			BP	352179	100745	20^{h} 25^{m} 33.25^{s}	+21° 02′ 18.0″	9.95		2000	A7	Algol variable
BS Vul			BS	344650		19^{h} 37^{m} 26.51^{s}	+21° 55′ 50.4″	10.08			F2	β Lyr variable, V_{max} = 10.9^{m}, V_{min} = 11.6^{m}, P = 0.47597147 d
BO Vul			BO	345287		19^{h} 56^{m} 29.07^{s}	+23° 54′ 45.0″	10.12			F0	Algol variable
HAT-P-49				340099		20^{h} 21^{m} 46.0^{s}	+26° 41′ 34″	10.21		1050	A5	has a planet (b)
HD 186943			QY	186943	97281	19^{h} 46^{m} 15.94^{s}	+28° 16′ 19.1″	10.23			WN3+O9.5V	Wolf–Rayet star and eclipsing binary
WW Vul			WW	344361		19^{h} 25^{m} 58.75^{s}	+21° 12′ 31.3″	10.25			A3	UX Ori variable, V_{max} = 10.25^{m}, V_{min} = 12.94^{m}
AW Vul			AW	340420		20^{h} 29^{m} 01.67^{s}	+24° 48′ 27.9″	11.40			F0	Algol variable, V_{max} = 10.8^{m}, V_{min} = 11.9^{m}, P = 0.80645141 d
Wolf 1346				340611	101516	20^{h} 34^{m} 21.88^{s}	+25° 03′ 49.7″	11.55		50.68	DA2.4	white dwarf
PX Vul			PX			19^{h} 26^{m} 40.26^{s}	+23° 53′ 50.9″	11.83			F3	Orion variable, V_{max} = 11.4^{m}, V_{min} = 12.8^{m}
G 185-32			PY			19^{h} 37^{m} 13.17^{s}	+27° 43′ 18.1″	12.97			DA	pulsating white dwarf, ΔV = 0.02^{m}
GD 385			PT			19^{h} 52^{m} 27.88^{s}	+25° 09′ 29.1″	15.11		124	DA4.2	pulsating white dwarf, ΔV = 0.05^{m}
XTE J1859+226			V406			18^{h} 58^{m} 41.58^{s}	+22° 39′ 29.6″				G5V-K0V	low-mass X-ray binary
TOI-5205						20^{h} 55^{m} 04.91^{s}	+24° 21′ 38.7″	15.9		285	M4V	has a transiting exoplanet (b)
LV Vul			LV			19^{h} 48^{m} 00.52^{s}	+27° 10′ 19.3″	16.9				nova, V_{max} = 4.5^{m}, V_{min} = 16.9^{m}
PW Vul			PW			19^{h} 26^{m} 05.06^{s}	+27° 21′ 58.8″	16.9				nova, V_{max} = 6.4^{m}, V_{min} = 16.9^{m}
VW Vul			VW			20^{h} 57^{m} 45.07^{s}	+25° 30′ 25.7″	17.0				Z Cam variable, V_{max} = 13.1^{m}, V_{min} = 17.0^{m}, P = 0.1687 d
QU Vul			QU			20^{h} 26^{m} 45.94^{s}	+27° 50′ 42.2″	17.9				nova, V_{max} = 5.3^{m}, V_{min} = 17.9^{m}
NQ Vul			NQ			19^{h} 29^{m} 14.69^{s}	+20° 27′ 59.6″	18				nova, V_{max} = 6.01^{m}, V_{min} = 18^{m}
GS 2000+25			QZ			20^{h} 02^{m} 49.58^{s}	+25° 14′ 11.3″	18.2			K3V-K6V	X-ray nova
V458 Vul			V458			19^{h} 54^{m} 24.61^{s}	+20° 52′ 52.6″	18.3				nova, V_{max} = 8.1^{m}, V_{min} = 18.3^{m}, P = 0.06812255 d
QV Vul			QV			19^{h} 04^{m} 40.32^{s}	+21° 46′ 14.2″	19				nova, V_{max} = 7^{m}, V_{min} = 19^{m}
CK Vul		11	CK			19^{h} 47^{m} 38.1^{s}	+27° 18′ 48″	20.0				Anthelm's Star; nova, V_{max} = 2.7^{m}, V_{min} = 20.0^{m}
PU Vul			PU			20^{h} 21^{m} 13.32^{s}	+21° 34′ 18.7″				A4II-F8Iab + M6IIIe	nova
WR 125			V378			19^{h} 28^{m} 15.62^{s}	+19° 33′ 21.4″				WCe+...	Wolf–Rayet star
QQ Vul			QQ			20^{h} 05^{m} 41.91^{s}	+22° 39′ 58.7″				M2	AM Her variable
PSR B1919+21						19^{h} 21^{m} 44.81^{s}	+21° 53′ 02.3″			2283		first pulsar discovered
PSR B1930+22						19^{h} 32^{m} 22.86^{s}	+22° 20′ 52.1″					pulsar
PSR B1937+21						19^{h} 39^{m} 38.56^{s}	+21° 35′ 59.1″					millisecond pulsar
PSR B1953+29						19^{h} 55^{m} 27.88^{s}	+29° 08′ 43.5″					millisecond pulsar
PSR B2020+28						20^{h} 22^{m} 37.07^{s}	+28° 54′ 23.1″					pulsar
PSR J2007+2722						20^{h} 07^{m} 15.77^{s}	+27° 22′ 47.7″			17200		pulsar
V407 Vul			V407			19^{h} 14^{m} 26.09^{s}	+24° 56′ 44.6″					AM CVn variable
Table legend: • Name = Proper name • B = Bayer designation • F or/and G. = Flamsteed designation or Gould designation • Var = Variable star designation • HD = Henry Draper Catalogue designation number • HIP = Hipparcos Catalogue designation number • RA = Right ascension for the Epoch/Equinox J2000.0 • Dec = Declination for the Epoch/Equinox J2000.0 • vis. mag. = visual magnitude (m or m_{v}), also known as apparent magnitude • abs. mag. = absolute magnitude (M_{v}) • Dist. (ly) = Distance in light-years from Earth • Sp. class = Spectral class of the star in the stellar classification system • Notes = Common name(s) or alternate name(s); comments; notable properties [for example: multiple star status, range of variability if it is a variable star, exoplanets, etc.]

== See also ==
- List of stars by constellation
- SGR 1935+2154
