= ER Vulpeculae =

Variable star in the constellation Vulpecula

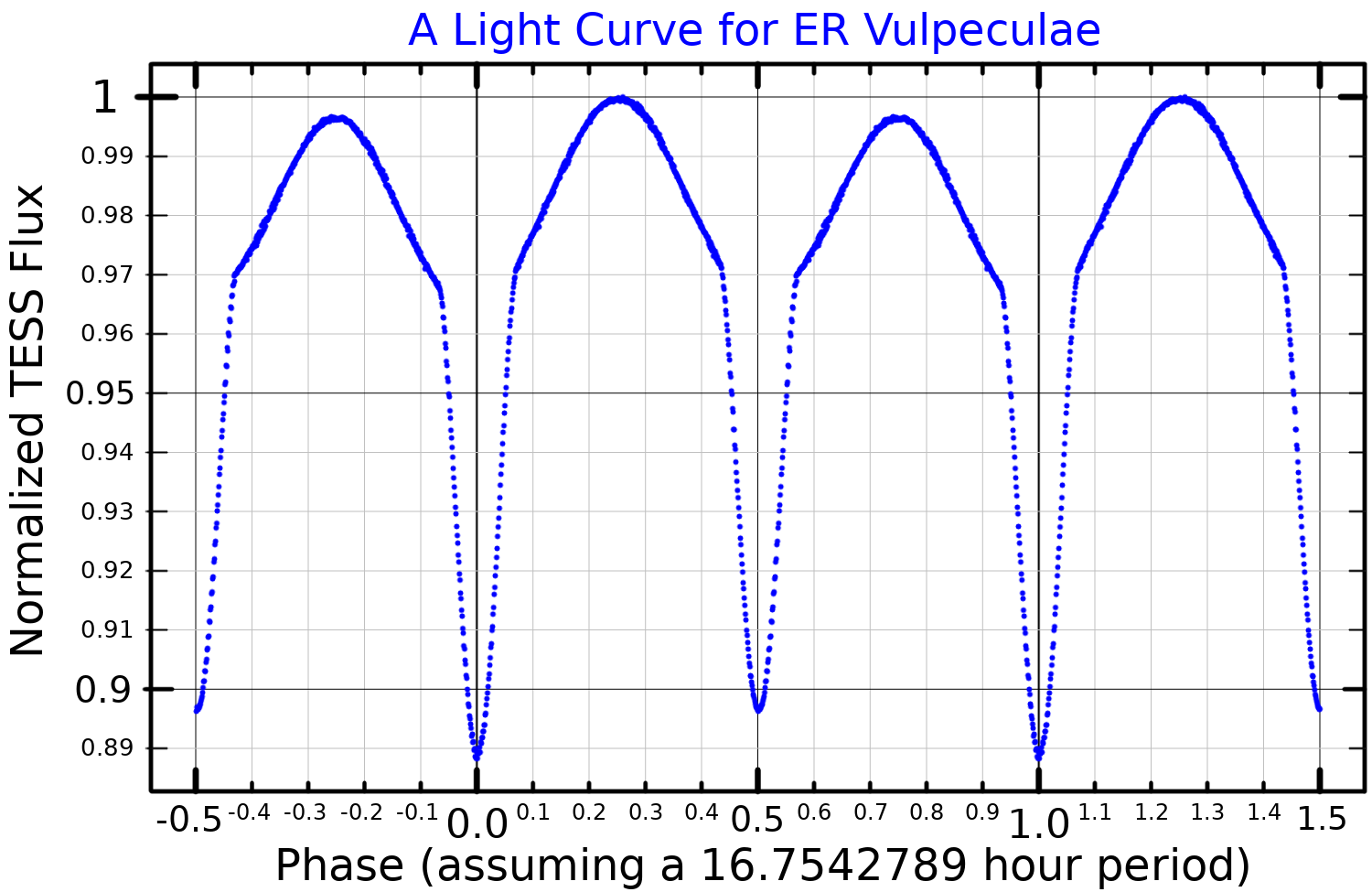
- A light curve for ER Vulpeculae, plotted from TESS data

Observation data Epoch J2000 Equinox J2000
- Constellation: Vulpecula
- Right ascension: 21^{h} 02^{m} 25.907^{s}
- Declination: 27° 48′ 26.44″
- Apparent magnitude (V): 7.27 to 7.49

Characteristics
- Spectral type: G0V + G5V
- B−V color index: 0.614±0.010
- Variable type: W UMa/RS CVn

Astrometry
Radial velocity (R_{v})	−24.6±0.5 km/s
Proper motion (μ)	RA: 87.102 mas/yr Dec.: 6.364 mas/yr
Parallax (π)	19.8012±0.0187 mas
Distance	164.7 ± 0.2 ly (50.50 ± 0.05 pc)
Absolute magnitude (M_{V})	3.75 (4.28 + 4.31)

Orbit
Period (P)	0.698095 d
Semi-major axis (a)	4.28±0.04 AU
Eccentricity (e)	0.017±0.007
Inclination (i)	66.63°
Periastron epoch (T)	2,445,220.40964 JD
Argument of periastron (ω) (secondary)	62.6±29.0°
Semi-amplitude (K_{1}) (primary)	138.67±2.06 km/s
Semi-amplitude (K_{2}) (secondary)	146.13±1.90 km/s

Details

ER Vul A
Mass	1.108±0.033 M_{☉}
Radius	1.16±0.06 R_{☉}
Luminosity	1.56±0.15 L_{☉}
Temperature	5,900 K
Rotational velocity (v sin i)	84 km/s

ER Vul B
Mass	1.052±0.034 M_{☉}
Radius	1.18±0.14 R_{☉}
Luminosity	1.52±0.37 L_{☉}
Temperature	5,750 K
Rotational velocity (v sin i)	78 km/s

Other designations
- ER Vul, CD+27°3952, HD 200391, HIP 103833, SAO 89396, PPM 112323

Database references
SIMBAD	data

ER Vulpeculae is a binary star system in the northern constellation of Vulpecula, abbreviated ER Vul. It is a variable star system with a brightness that ranges from an apparent visual magnitude of 7.27 down to 7.49, which is too faint to be visible to the naked eye. This system is located at a distance of 165 light years from the Sun based on parallax measurements. It is drifting closer with a radial velocity of −25 km/s.

This star was observed to be a double-lined spectroscopic binary by R. J. Northcott in 1946, indicating this is a binary star system where the individual spectra of each component is visible. G. A. Bakos found it to be a candidate eclipsing binary in 1955, and orbital elements were produced in 1956. The light curve of the system showed a very short orbital period of 16.75 hours and was found to vary continually between the minima. Both components were classified as G-type main-sequence stars.

The wavy shape of the light curve of ER Vul resembles those of a W UMa star for a detached binary, indicating that the stars are not in direct contact but are close enough to gravitationally distort their shapes. By 1967, studies showed unexplained fluctuations in the light curve. H. E. Bond in 1970 found calcium H and K lines in emission. D. S. Hall classified the ER Vul system as a short period RS Canum Venaticorum variable in 1970, based on the spectral type and emission lines. These emission lines suggest some form of chromospheric activity on the star. Dark star spots were proposed as an explanation of the intrinsic variability of these types of stars by H. M. Al-Naimiy, and ER Vul was determined to be heavily spotted.

The corona of ER Vul was found to be a strong source of soft X-rays by F. M. Walter and S. Bowyer in 1981. The eclipsing nature of the system was confirmed by T. H. Kadouri in 1981, with the primary eclipse being an occultation. Radio emission was detected with the VLA in 1992, and it was found to be one of the most luminous main-sequence stars known in that band. Due to gravitational interaction that has forced a tidal lock with their close orbit, both stars are rotating rapidly – more than 40 times the rotation rate of the Sun, which is driving their magnetic dynamo. They show the "strongest coronal and chromospheric emissions of any main-sequence G-type star".

C. İbanoğlu and associates in 1993 were able to explain the light curve of this system through a combination of "proximity effects, wavelike distortions, mutual eclipses, and short-term light fluctuations". By measuring variations in Hydrogen alpha emission, Ö. Çakırlı and associates in 2003 found that cooler secondary component is the more active of the pair. However, other observers have observed that the primary is the more active. This changeover may be the result of magnetic interaction between the stars. In 2005, E. Shkolnik and associates discovered a high-velocity stream passing between the stars toward the secondary component. This stream is creating a large active area on the companion.
