= 25 Vulpeculae =

Star in the constellation Vulpecula

Observation data Epoch J2000.0 Equinox J2000.0
- Constellation: Vulpecula
- Right ascension: 20^{h} 22^{m} 03.43076^{s}
- Declination: +24° 26′ 45.9526″
- Apparent magnitude (V): 5.50

Characteristics
- Spectral type: B6 IVe
- B−V color index: −0.09±0.02

Astrometry
| Radial velocity (R_{v}) | −11.0±3.6 km/s |
| Proper motion (μ) | RA: +0.605 mas/yr Dec.: −5.732 mas/yr |
| Parallax (π) | 2.7932±0.1493 mas |
| Distance | 1,170 ± 60 ly (360 ± 20 pc) |
| Absolute magnitude (M_{V}) | −1.88 |

Details
| Mass | 7±1 M_{☉} |
| Radius | 11±1 R_{☉} |
| Luminosity (bolometric) | 1,345+215 −184 L_{☉} |
| Surface gravity (log g) | 3.52±0.21 cgs |
| Temperature | 13,170±330 K |
| Rotational velocity (v sin i) | 160±14 km/s |

Other designations
- 25 Vul, BD+23°3986, HD 193911, HIP 100435, HR 7789, SAO 88580

Database references
| SIMBAD | data |

25 Vulpeculae is a single star in the northern constellation of Vulpecula, located roughly 1,170 light years away from the Sun. It is visible to the naked eye as a faint, blue-white hued star with an apparent visual magnitude of 5.50 This object is moving closer to the Earth with a heliocentric radial velocity of −11 km/s.

This is a Be star with a stellar classification of B6 IVe, matching the spectrum of an aging subgiant with a circumstellar disk of ionized gas. Cowley (1972) had it rated as a more evolved giant star with a class of B8 IIIn, where the 'n' notation indicates "nebulous" lines due to rapid rotation. It has a high rate of spin, showing a projected rotational velocity of 160 km/s. The star has 7 times the mass of the Sun and 11 times the Sun's radius. It is radiating 1,345 times the luminosity of the Sun from its photosphere at an effective temperature of 13,170 K.
