= 24 Vulpeculae =

Red clump giant star in the constellation Vulpecula

Observation data Epoch J2000 Equinox ICRS
- Constellation: Vulpecula
- Right ascension: 20^{h} 16^{m} 47.0863^{s}
- Declination: +24° 40′ 15.965″
- Apparent magnitude (V): 5.30

Characteristics
- Evolutionary stage: red clump
- Spectral type: G8III
- B−V color index: 0.951

Astrometry
Radial velocity (R_{v})	+15.3±0.3 km/s
Proper motion (μ)	RA: 15.128±0.055 mas/yr Dec.: −17.015±0.057 mas/yr
Parallax (π)	7.9700±0.0674 mas
Distance	409 ± 3 ly (125 ± 1 pc)
Absolute magnitude (M_{V})	−0.68

Details
Mass	3.41 M_{☉}
Radius	16 R_{☉}
Luminosity	191 L_{☉}
Surface gravity (log g)	2.48 cgs
Temperature	4,981 K
Metallicity [Fe/H]	−0.06 dex
Rotational velocity (v sin i)	5.02 km/s
Age	251 Myr

Other designations
- 24 Vul, BD+24°4075, FK5 760, HD 192944, HIP 99951, HR 7753, SAO 88451

Database references
SIMBAD	data

24 Vulpeculae is a single, yellow-hued star in the northern constellation of Vulpecula. It is faintly visible to the naked eye with an apparent visual magnitude of 5.30. The distance to this star can be estimated from its annual parallax shift of 7.9700±0.0674, which yields a separation of roughly 409 light years. It is moving further away with a heliocentric radial velocity of +15 km/s.

This is an evolved giant star with a stellar classification of G8III, having exhausted the hydrogen at its core and moved off the main sequence. It is a red clump giant, indicating it is presently on the horizontal branch and is generating energy through helium fusion in its core region. The interferometry-measured angular diameter of 24 Vul is 1.08±0.02 mas, which, at its estimated distance, equates to a physical radius of about 16 times the radius of the Sun.

24 Vulpeculae is about 251 million years old and is spinning with a projected rotational velocity of 5.02 km/s. It has 3.41 times the mass of the Sun and is radiating 191 times the Sun's luminosity from its enlarged photosphere at an effective temperature of 4,981 K. This is the probable (99.4% chance) source of X-ray emission coming from these coordinates.
