= 27 Vulpeculae =

Star in the constellation Vulpecula

- 27 Vulpeculae in the constellation Vulpecula

Observation data Epoch J2000 Equinox ICRS
- Constellation: Vulpecula
- Right ascension: 20^{h} 37^{m} 04.6724^{s}
- Declination: +26° 27′ 43.006″
- Apparent magnitude (V): 5.590

Characteristics
- Evolutionary stage: main sequence
- Spectral type: B9 V
- B−V color index: −0.050±0.004

Astrometry
Radial velocity (R_{v})	−21.8±4.3 km/s
Proper motion (μ)	RA: 15.349±0.042 mas/yr Dec.: −11.775±0.040 mas/yr
Parallax (π)	10.6692±0.0483 mas
Distance	306 ± 1 ly (93.7 ± 0.4 pc)
Absolute magnitude (M_{V})	0.65

Details
Mass	2.77±0.03 M_{☉}
Radius	3.1 R_{☉}
Luminosity	75.0+4.8 −4.5 L_{☉}
Surface gravity (log g)	3.781 cgs
Temperature	10,789+50 −49 K
Metallicity [Fe/H]	−0.27±0.04 dex
Rotational velocity (v sin i)	335 km/s

Other designations
- 27 Vul, BD+25° 4302, FK5 3649, HD 196504, HIP 101716, HR 7880, SAO 88903

Database references
SIMBAD	data

27 Vulpeculae is a single, blue-white star in the northern constellation of Vulpecula. It is a dim star, visible to the naked eye, with an apparent visual magnitude of 5.59. An annual parallax shift of 10.6692±0.0483 mas provides a distance estimate of about 306 light-years. It is moving closer with a heliocentric radial velocity of −22 km/s, and will make perihelion passage at a distance of around 119 ly (36.56 pc) in 3.75 million years.

This is a B-type main-sequence star with a stellar classification of B9 V. It is spinning rapidly, showing a projected rotational velocity of 335. The star has an estimated 2.77 times the mass of the Sun and about 3.1 times the Sun's radius. It is radiating 75 times the Sun's luminosity from its photosphere at an effective temperature of 10,789 K.

== BD Vulpeculae ==
The location of the reddish colored carbon star BD Vulpeculae (CCCS 2916 / CGCS 4915) is, as seen from Earth, immediately northeast of 27 Vulpeculae. Astronomers and amateur astronomers could use 27 Vulpeculae as guidestar to try to find BD Vulpeculae and to see the color contrast of the bluish white star 27 Vulpeculae and the nearby reddish carbon star.
