= 16 Vulpeculae =

Binary star system in the constellation Vulpecula

Observation data Epoch J2000.0 Equinox ICRS
- Constellation: Vulpecula
- Right ascension: 20^{h} 02^{m} 01.43152^{s}
- Declination: +24° 56′ 16.9534″
- Apparent magnitude (V): 5.787 5.93 + 6.22

Characteristics
- Spectral type: F2 III
- U−B color index: +0.10
- B−V color index: +0.37

Astrometry
Radial velocity (R_{v})	−37.00±3.7 km/s
Proper motion (μ)	RA: 89.31 mas/yr Dec.: 69.44 mas/yr
Parallax (π)	14.71±0.50 mas
Distance	222 ± 8 ly (68 ± 2 pc)
Absolute magnitude (M_{V})	2.47

Orbit
Period (P)	1201 yr
Semi-major axis (a)	2.687″
Eccentricity (e)	0.932
Inclination (i)	79.0°
Longitude of the node (Ω)	84.5°
Periastron epoch (T)	B 1863.7
Argument of periastron (ω) (secondary)	276.5°

Details

16 Vul A
Mass	1.34 M_{☉}
Luminosity	31.13 L_{☉}
Surface gravity (log g)	3.76±0.14 cgs
Temperature	6,888±234 K
Metallicity [Fe/H]	0.17 dex
Rotational velocity (v sin i)	136.1±6.8 km/s
Age	742 Myr

Other designations
- 16 Vul, BD+24° 3977, HD 190004, HIP 98636, HR 7657, SAO 88098

Database references
SIMBAD	data

16 Vulpeculae is a binary star system in the northern constellation Vulpecula. It has a combined apparent visual magnitude of 5.787, which is near the lower limit of visibility to the naked eye. Based upon an annual parallax shift of 14.71±0.50 as seen from Earth's orbit, it is located about 222 light years away. The system is moving closer to the Sun with a heliocentric radial velocity of about −37 km/s. It will make its closest approach in about 0.9 million years, coming within 155 light-years (47.42 pc).

The pair orbit each other with an estimated period of 1,201 years and an orbital eccentricity of 0.932. The magnitude 5.93 primary, component A, displays a stellar classification of F2III, matching an aging F-type giant star. This star is spinning rapidly with a projected rotational velocity of 136 km/s. This is giving the star an oblate shape with an equatorial bulge that is an estimated 21% larger than the polar radius. It is 742 million years old with 1.34 times the mass of the Sun. The star is radiating 31 times the Sun's luminosity from its photosphere at an effective temperature of about 6,888 K.
