= 13 Vulpeculae =

Star in the constellation Vulpecula

- Location of 13 Vulpeculae (circled)

Observation data Epoch J2000 Equinox ICRS
- Constellation: Vulpecula
- 13 Vulpeculae A
- Right ascension: 19^{h} 53^{m} 27.6957^{s}
- Declination: 24° 04′ 46.608″
- Apparent magnitude (V): 4.64
- 13 Vulpeculae B
- Right ascension: 19^{h} 53^{m} 27.6102^{s}
- Declination: 24° 04′ 46.077″
- Apparent magnitude (V): 7.34

Characteristics

13 Vulpeculae A
- Spectral type: B9.5III
- Apparent magnitude (U): 4.404±0.012
- Apparent magnitude (B): 4.536±0.010

Astrometry

13 Vulpeculae A
Radial velocity (R_{v})	−28.10 km/s
Proper motion (μ)	RA: 22.325±0.065 mas/yr Dec.: 36.510±0.072 mas/yr
Parallax (π)	9.6342±0.0902 mas
Distance	339 ± 3 ly (103.8 ± 1.0 pc)
Absolute magnitude (M_{V})	−0.48

13 Vulpeculae B
Proper motion (μ)	RA: 14.037±0.135 mas/yr Dec.: 32.954±0.131 mas/yr
Parallax (π)	9.8828±0.1524 mas
Distance	330 ± 5 ly (101 ± 2 pc)

Orbit
Period (P)	615.25±104.12 yr
Semi-major axis (a)	1.555±0.241″
Eccentricity (e)	0.079±0.042
Inclination (i)	85.9±1.5°
Longitude of the node (Ω)	68.1±0.3°
Periastron epoch (T)	2027.82±94.79
Argument of periastron (ω) (secondary)	169.7±4.4°

Details

13 Vul A
Radius	1.3 R_{☉}
Luminosity	180 L_{☉}
Temperature	8,801 K
Metallicity [Fe/H]	−0.11 dex
Rotational velocity (v sin i)	45.0 km/s

Other designations
- 13 Vul, BD+23°3820, GC 27544, HD 188260, HIP 97886, HR 7592, SAO 87883, CCDM J19535+2405AB, WDS J19535+2405AB, 2MASS J19532768+2404464

Database references
SIMBAD	data

13 Vulpeculae is a blue giant with a stellar classification of class B9.5III in the northern constellation Vulpecula. It is visible to the naked eye as a faint, blue-white hued star with an apparent visual magnitude of 4.57 and it is approximately 339 light years away from the Sun based on parallax. The star is radiating 180 times the luminosity of the Sun from its photosphere at an effective temperature of 8,801 K.

There is one reported companion, designated component B, with a magnitude of 7.37, an orbital period of roughly 615 years, and an angular separation of 1.55″. The system is moving closer to the Earth with a heliocentric radial velocity of −28 km/s.
