= 10 Vulpeculae =

Star in the constellation Vulpecula

Observation data Epoch J2000 Equinox ICRS
- Constellation: Vulpecula
- Right ascension: 19^{h} 43^{m} 42.92539^{s}
- Declination: +25° 46′ 18.9293″
- Apparent magnitude (V): 5.497

Characteristics
- Spectral type: G8 III
- B−V color index: 0.923

Astrometry
Radial velocity (R_{v})	−9.9 km/s
Proper motion (μ)	RA: +12.01 mas/yr Dec.: +21.44 mas/yr
Parallax (π)	9.83±0.49 mas
Distance	330 ± 20 ly (102 ± 5 pc)
Absolute magnitude (M_{V})	0.47

Details
Mass	2.35 M_{☉}
Radius	13 R_{☉}
Luminosity	72 L_{☉}
Surface gravity (log g)	3.08 cgs
Temperature	5,008±33 K
Metallicity [Fe/H]	−0.11 dex
Age	1.15 Gyr

Other designations
- 10 Vul, BD+25°3933, FK5 1515, HD 186486, HIP 97077, HR 7506, SAO 87633

Database references
SIMBAD	data

10 Vulpeculae is an astrometric binary star system in the northern constellation of Vulpecula. It is faintly visible to the naked eye with an apparent visual magnitude of 5.497. The system is located roughly 330 light years from the Sun, as determined from an annual parallax shift of 9.83±0.49 mas. It is moving closer to the Sun with a heliocentric radial velocity of −9.9 km/s.

The system is a source of X-ray emission. The visible component is an aging giant star with a stellar classification of G8 III. At the age of 1.15 billion years, it has exhausted the hydrogen at its core region and expanded off the main sequence. It is about 13 times the Sun's radius and 2.35 times the Sun's mass. The star is radiating 72 times the Sun's luminosity from its enlarged photosphere at an effective temperature of 5,008 K.
