= PU Vulpeculae =

Variable star in the constellation Vulpecula

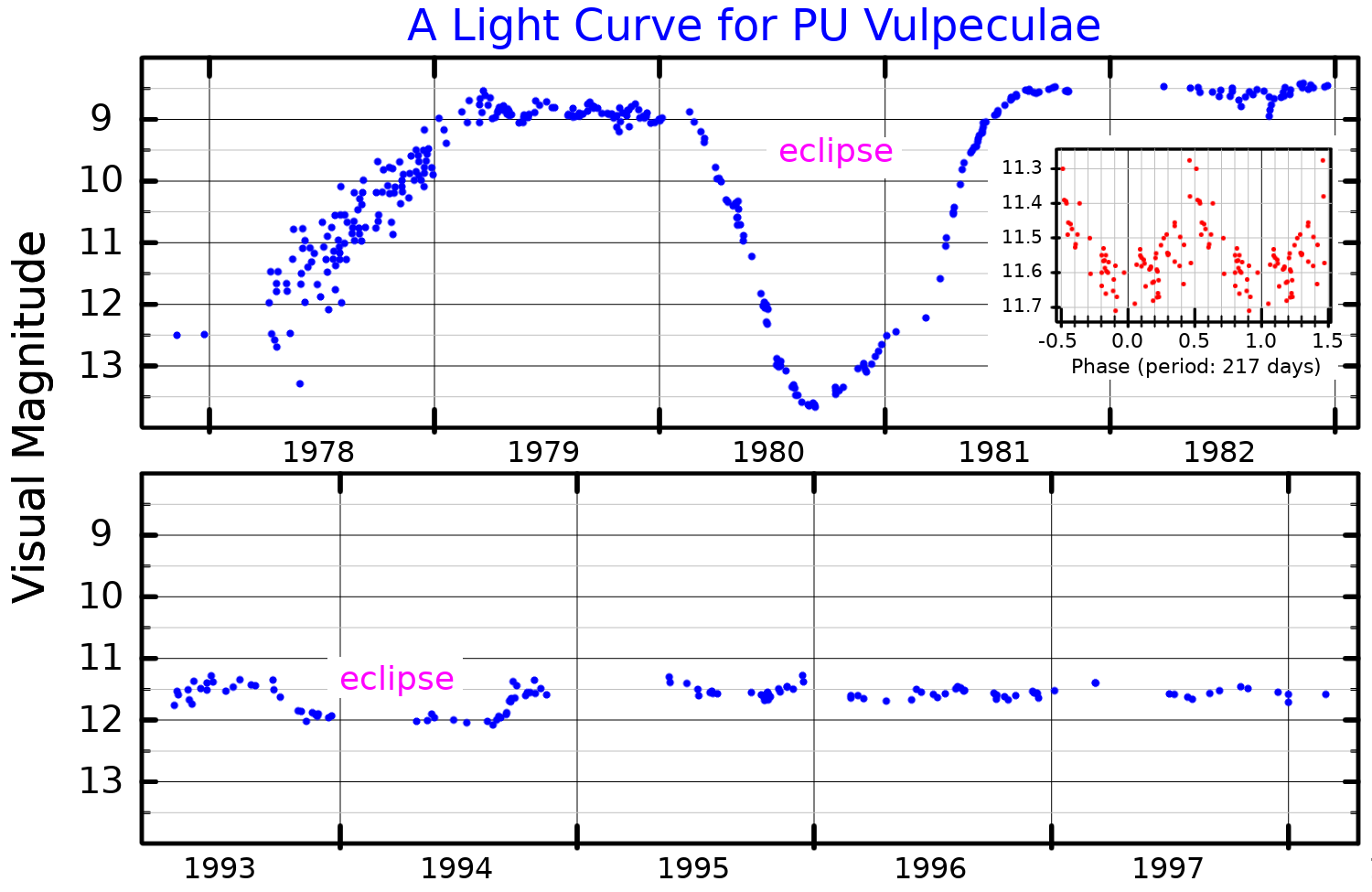
- A visual band light curve for PU Vulpeculae, adapted from Belyakina et al., Kolotilov & Belyakina, and Chochol et al.. The main plots show the long-term variability, and the inset plot within the upper panel shows the Mira pulsations.

Observation data Epoch J2000 Equinox J2000
- Constellation: Vulpecula
- Right ascension: 20^{h} 21^{m} 13.311^{s}
- Declination: 21° 34′ 18.70″
- Apparent magnitude (V): 8.7 to 16.6

Characteristics
- Spectral type: M6
- Variable type: Slow nova

Astrometry
Proper motion (μ)	RA: −3.002 mas/yr Dec.: −6.006 mas/yr
Parallax (π)	0.1909±0.0393 mas
Distance	approx. 17,000 ly (approx. 5,000 pc)

Details

Red giant
Mass	0.5–0.9 M_{☉}
Temperature	3,200±100 K

White dwarf
Mass	0.6 M_{☉}
Radius	0.04 – 97 R_{☉}
Luminosity	5,900 – 16,800 L_{☉}
Temperature	6,300 – 165,000 K

Other designations
- Kuwano-Honda, Kuwano's Nebula, Kuwano's Object, Nova Vul 1979, PU Vul, GSC 1643.01021, IRAS 20189+2124

Database references
SIMBAD	data

PU Vulpeculae is a very slowly evolving symbiotic nova in the northern constellation of Vulpecula, abbreviated PU Vul. It is too faint to be visible to the naked eye, reaching a maximum apparent visual magnitude of 8.7 following a minimum of 16.6. The system is located at a distance of approximately 17,000 light years from the Sun based on parallax measurements.

The brightening of this object during April 1979 was independently discovered by Y. Kuwano and M. Honda. At detection, it had a visual magnitude of 9.1 and was initially designated Nova Vulpeculae 1979. Photographic plates taken since November 1977 showed a dramatic increase of five magnitudes at the time of discovery. In September, 1978, it had been catalogued as a stellar class of M4. A search of Harvard Observatory archival plates taken since 1898 showed several smaller eruptions of this star.

For much of 1979 the object had a brightness of magnitude 8.9 while varying by a magnitude of 0.15 with a period of about 80 says, then it began to fade rapidly in 1980, reaching a minimum magnitude of 13.65 in August. At this minimum, the spectrum showed bands of the TiO molecule, which is typical of lower temperature M-type stars. It began to brighten again at about the same rate as the decrease, reaching magnitude 8.5 in August, 1981. The star remained mostly stable at this level for about a year, displaying a pair of brief dips in brightness during 1982. Polarization of the light indicated the formation of large dust particles, which was suggested as a cause of the brightness decrease in 1980.

A soft X-ray halo was detected around the object in 1980, as well as a weaker ring-like structure. Infrared observations in 1980 suggested this is a symbiotic binary star system consisting of a variable, evolved star that has expanded to fill its Roche lobe and is periodically transferring mass to a faint, compact companion. However, the system did not show the expected emission lines from the infalling material. The spectrum at the minimum indicated the evolved star is a giant of class M6. The hot component showed a supergiant or bright giant spectrum that changed from a class of F5 in 1983 to A2 in 1986, while the brightness remained near magnitude 8.7. During this time the hot component changed from resembling a 97 R_{☉} supergiant with a temperature similar to the Sun into a white dwarf smaller than the sun with a temperature in excess of 150,000 K. Emission lines became visible in 1988 as the outer layers were shed and became a nebula surrounding the white dwarf remnant.

The brightness of this object finally began to steadily decrease in 1987. By September 1989, it had declined to magnitude 10.5. The spectrum began to resemble a nebula, which came from a hot stellar wind expanding at a velocity of 500 km/s or more. In 1993, the emission features from the wind temporarily disappeared, which suggested the system was undergoing an eclipse. The data indicated this is an eclipsing binary with an orbital period of 13.42±0.27 years, which meant the orbital plane is nearly aligned with the line of sight from the Earth. An eclipse would explain the unusual minimum during 1980. The cool component was determined to be on the asymptotic giant branch and is pulsating with a period of 217 days, making it a Mira variable. The compact companion is a white dwarf with mass estimated at 60% of the mass of the Sun. The system displays an "illumination effect" caused by the ionization of the stellar wind from the giant by the dwarf. The light curve of this variation suggests an orbital eccentricity of at least 0.16.
