= 17 Vulpeculae =

Star in the constellation Vulpecula

Observation data Epoch J2000 Equinox ICRS
- Constellation: Vulpecula
- Right ascension: 20^{h} 06^{m} 53.4077^{s}
- Declination: +23° 36′ 51.929″
- Apparent magnitude (V): 5.08

Characteristics
- Evolutionary stage: main sequence
- Spectral type: B3 V
- B−V color index: −0.162±0.002

Astrometry
Radial velocity (R_{v})	−7.6±0.8 km/s
Proper motion (μ)	RA: 15.246±0.096 mas/yr Dec.: 0.316±0.108 mas/yr
Parallax (π)	6.8168±0.1430 mas
Distance	480 ± 10 ly (147 ± 3 pc)
Absolute magnitude (M_{V})	−0.86

Details
Mass	6.1±0.1 M_{☉}
Radius	3.9 R_{☉}
Luminosity	573.30 L_{☉}
Temperature	15,648 K
Metallicity [Fe/H]	−0.14±0.04 dex
Rotational velocity (v sin i)	115 km/s
Age	10.7±1.9 Myr

Other designations
- 17 Vul, BD+23° 3896, FK5 3611, HD 190993, HIP 99080, HR 7688, SAO 88212

Database references
SIMBAD	data

17 Vulpeculae is a single, blue-white hued star in the northern constellation of Vulpecula. The distance to this star can be estimated from its annual parallax shift of 6.8168±0.1430, which yields a separation of roughly 480 light years. It is moving nearer with a heliocentric radial velocity of −8 km/s, and will make its closest approach in around 6.1 million years at a distance of about 419 ly (128.36 pc). The star is faintly visible to the naked eye with an apparent visual magnitude of 5.08.

This is an ordinary B-type main-sequence star with a stellar classification of B3 V. It is just 11 million years old with a high projected rotational velocity of 115 km/s. The star has an estimated 6.1 times the mass of the Sun and around 3.9 times the Sun's radius. It is radiating 573 times the Sun's luminosity from its photosphere at an effective temperature of 15,648 K.
