= 15 Vulpeculae =

A-type giant star in the constellation Vulpecula

- Location of 15 Vulpeculae (circled)

Observation data Epoch J2000 Equinox J2000
- Constellation: Vulpecula
- Right ascension: 20^{h} 01^{m} 06.0486^{s}
- Declination: +27° 45′ 12.863″
- Apparent magnitude (V): 4.62 - 4.67

Characteristics
- Evolutionary stage: subgiant
- Spectral type: A4IIIm or kA5hA7mA7 (IV–V)
- U−B color index: +0.15
- B−V color index: +0.18
- Variable type: α^{2} CVn

Astrometry
Radial velocity (R_{v})	−26.10 km/s
Proper motion (μ)	RA: 57.817±0.081 mas/yr Dec.: 3.994±0.085 mas/yr
Parallax (π)	13.4427±0.1050 mas
Distance	243 ± 2 ly (74.4 ± 0.6 pc)
Absolute magnitude (M_{V})	0.36

Details
Mass	2.41 M_{☉}
Radius	4.43 (Note: Calculated, using the Stefan-Boltzmann law and the star's effective temperature and luminosity, with respect to the solar nominal effective temperature of 5,772 K: $$\sqrt{\biggl(\frac{5,772}{7,685}\biggr)^4 \cdot 10^{1.79}} = 4.43\ R_\odot.$$) R_{☉}
Luminosity	61.6 L_{☉}
Surface gravity (log g)	3.53 cgs
Temperature	7,685±100 K
Metallicity [Fe/H]	+0.02 dex
Rotational velocity (v sin i)	15.0 km/s

Other designations
- 15 Vul, NT Vul, BD+27°3587, FK5 1523, GC 27753, HD 189849, HIP 98543, HR 7653, SAO 88071

Database references
SIMBAD	data

15 Vulpeculae is a variable star in the northern constellation of Vulpecula, located approximately 243 light years away based on parallax measurements. It has the variable star designation NT Vulpeculae; 15 Vulpeculae is the Flamsteed designation. It is visible to the naked eye as a faint, white-hued star with a typical apparent visual magnitude of 4.66. This object is moving closer to the Earth with a heliocentric radial velocity of −26 km/s.

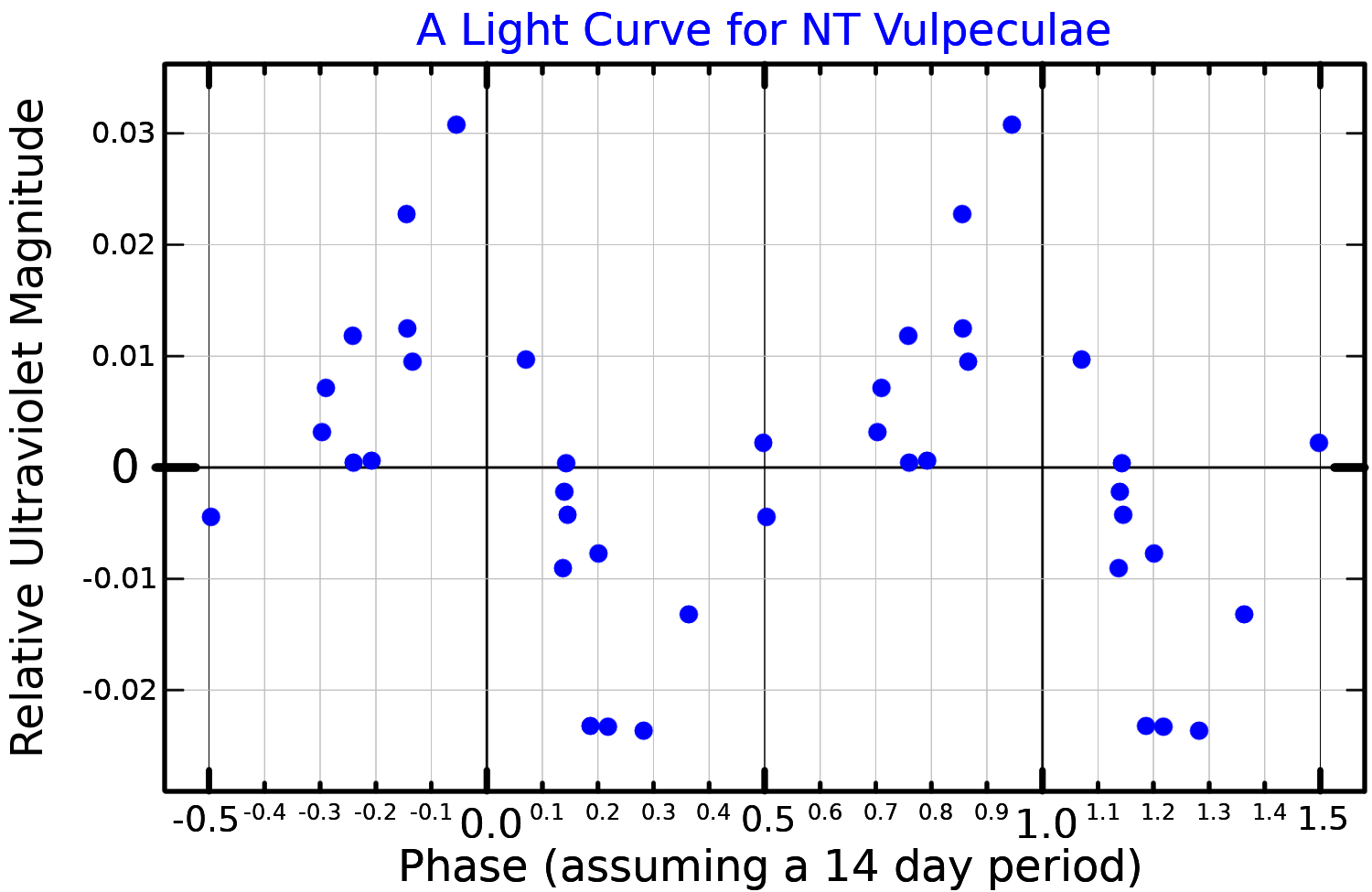
An ultraviolet band light curve for NT Vulpeculae, adapted from Kuvshinov et al. (1976)

The star is considered a marginal Am star with a stellar classification of A4 IIIm, matching an evolved A-type giant star. However, Gray & Garrison (1989) found a class of kA5hA7mA7 (IV–V), which matches a blend of subgiant and main sequence luminosity classes with the K-line (kA5) of an A5 star and the hydrogen (hA7) and metal (mA7) absorption lines of an A7 star. 15 Vulpeculae was a typical Am star when a main sequence, when evolving into a subgiant, it lost most of the peculiar properties of an Am star but still maintain some element abundance peculiarities. The star is 2.4 times more massive than the Sun and has expanded to four times the Sun's diameter. It is radiating 62 times the Sun's luminosity from its photosphere at an effective temperature of 7,685 K. In 1974 L. P. Metik announced that 15 Vulpeculae is a variable star. It is an Alpha^{2} Canum Venaticorum-type variable with magnitude ranging from 4.62 down to 4.67 over a period of 14 days.

There is evidence that 15 Vulpeculae may have a companion star, given the high margins of error in the astrometric measurements taken by Gaia DR3, as well as its unusually slow projected rotational velocity, which could also be explained if the star is being viewed pole-on.
