= 35 Vulpeculae =

Star in the constellation Vulpecula

Observation data Epoch J2000 Equinox J2000
- Constellation: Vulpecula
- Right ascension: 21^{h} 27^{m} 40.0577^{s}
- Declination: +27° 36′ 30.940″
- Apparent magnitude (V): 5.39

Characteristics
- Evolutionary stage: main sequence
- Spectral type: A1VmA3
- B−V color index: 0.049±0.003

Astrometry
Radial velocity (R_{v})	−8.0±2.8 km/s
Proper motion (μ)	RA: 41.336(65) mas/yr Dec.: 20.923(59) mas/yr
Parallax (π)	16.9162±0.0681 mas
Distance	192.8 ± 0.8 ly (59.1 ± 0.2 pc)
Absolute magnitude (M_{V})	1.56

Details
Mass	2.15 M_{☉}
Radius	1.70 R_{☉}
Luminosity	21.6 L_{☉}
Surface gravity (log g)	4.35±0.14 cgs
Temperature	9,622±327 K
Metallicity [Fe/H]	+0.4 dex
Rotational velocity (v sin i)	81 km/s
Age	212 Myr

Other designations
- 35 Vul, BD+26°4164, FK5 1549, HD 204414, HIP 105966, HR 8217, SAO 89720

Database references
SIMBAD	data

35 Vulpeculae is a single, white-hued star in the northern constellation of Vulpecula. It is faintly visible to the naked eye with an apparent visual magnitude of 5.39. An annual parallax shift of 16.9162±0.0681 mas provides a distance estimate of about 193 light years. It is moving closer with a heliocentric radial velocity of −8 km/s.

This is an A-type main-sequence star with a stellar classification of A1VmA3, indicating it has the spectrum of an A1 class star with the metal-lines of an A3 star. It is an estimated 212 million years old with a projected rotational velocity of 81 km/s. The star has 2.15 times the mass of the Sun with 1.70 times the Sun's radius. It is radiating 21.6 times the Sun's luminosity from its photosphere at an effective temperature of around 9,622 K.
