= 1 Vulpeculae =

Star in the constellation Vulpecula

- Location of 1 Vulpeculae (circled)

Observation data Epoch J2000 Equinox J2000
- Constellation: Vulpecula
- Right ascension: 19^{h} 16^{m} 13.0392^{s}
- Declination: 21° 23′ 25.544″
- Apparent magnitude (V): 4.77

Characteristics
- Spectral type: B4IV
- U−B color index: -0.54
- B−V color index: -0.05

Astrometry
Radial velocity (R_{v})	−17.00 km/s
Proper motion (μ)	RA: −0.383±0.141 mas/yr Dec.: −5.809±0.152 mas/yr
Parallax (π)	4.2065±0.1557 mas
Distance	780 ± 30 ly (238 ± 9 pc)
Absolute magnitude (M_{V})	−2.20

Details
Mass	6.9 M_{☉}
Luminosity	919 L_{☉}
Surface gravity (log g)	3.74 cgs
Temperature	16,787 K
Metallicity [Fe/H]	0.00 dex
Rotational velocity (v sin i)	80 km/s

Other designations
- CCDM J19162+2123A, BD+21 3713, FK5 3540, GC 26569, GSC 01611-02043, 2MASS J19161302+2123257, HIP 94703, HR 7306, HD 180554, SAO 87010, WDS J19162+2123A

Database references
SIMBAD	data

1 Vulpeculae is a class B4IV (blue subgiant) star in the constellation Vulpecula. Its apparent magnitude is 4.77 and it is approximately 780 light years away based on parallax.

The primary was discovered to be a spectroscopic binary in 1978 with a period around 250 days although the orbital elements are described as marginal. There are also companions B, with magnitude 11.6 and separation 39.1", and C, with magnitude 12.8 and separation 43.6".

Component A is also a suspected variable star, reported to vary from 4.57 to 4.77 in magnitude. It was reported as possibly variable in 1952 during a search for β CMa variables, but has not been seen to vary since. It was listed as one of the least variable stars based on Hipparcos photometry.

On 29 May 1983, 1 Vulpeculae was occulted by the asteroid Pallas. This event was observed at 130 locations in the United States and Mexico and was the best observed of all asteroid occultation events.
