= 21 Vulpeculae =

Star in the constellation Vulpecula

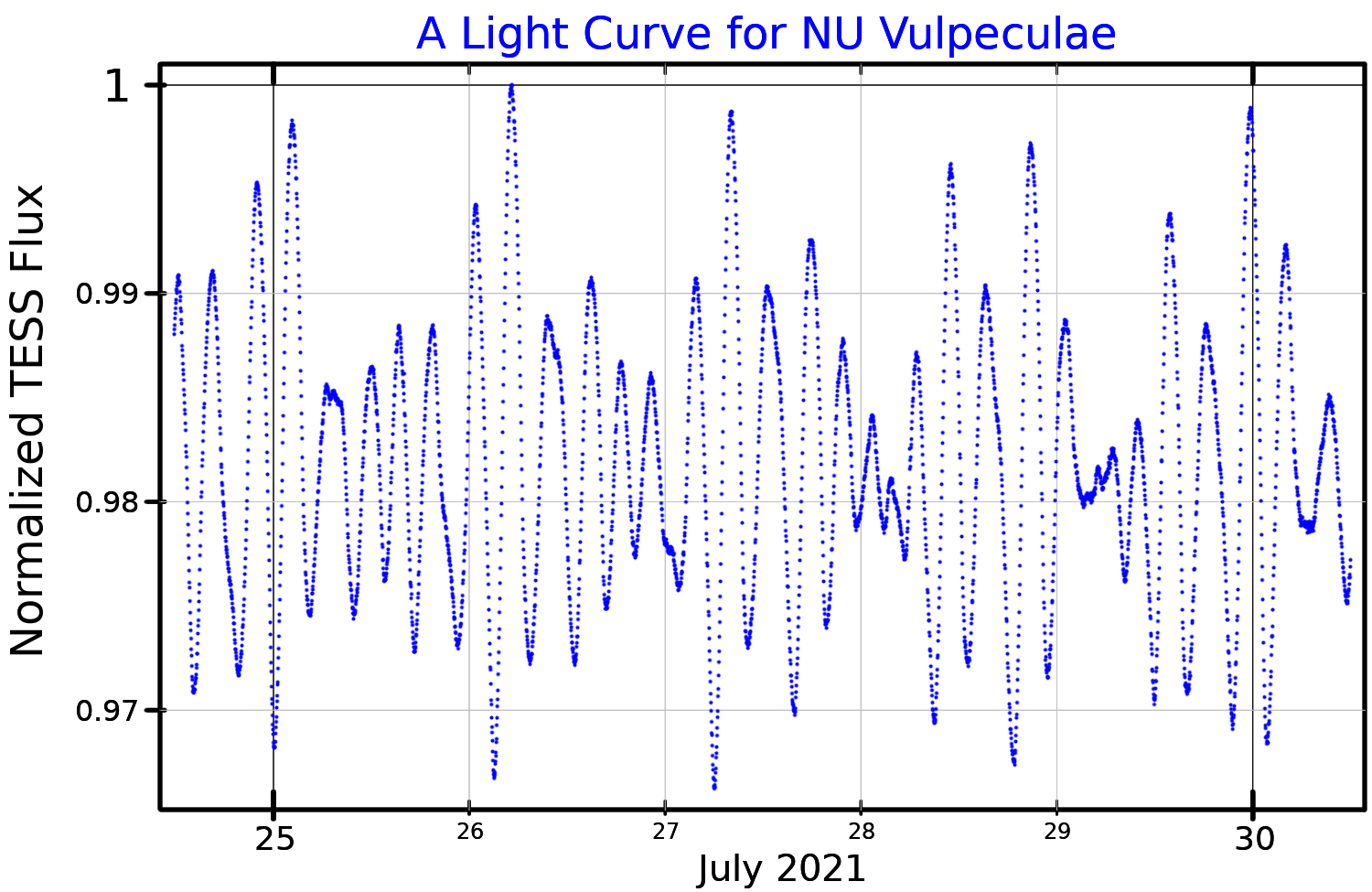
- A light curve for NU Vulpeculae, plotted from TESS data

Observation data Epoch J2000 Equinox J2000
- Constellation: Vulpecula
- Right ascension: 20^{h} 14^{m} 14.5295^{s}
- Declination: +28° 41′ 41.342″
- Apparent magnitude (V): 5.19

Characteristics
- Spectral type: A7 IVn or A5 Vn
- B−V color index: 0.191±0.003
- Variable type: δ Sct

Astrometry
| Radial velocity (R_{v}) | +7.0±4.2 km/s |
| Proper motion (μ) | RA: 12.541±0.050 mas/yr Dec.: −19.117±0.068 mas/yr |
| Parallax (π) | 10.4302±0.0696 mas |
| Distance | 313 ± 2 ly (95.9 ± 0.6 pc) |
| Absolute magnitude (M_{V}) | 0.39 |

Details
| Mass | 1.61 or 2.36±0.03 M_{☉} |
| Radius | 1.5 R_{☉} |
| Luminosity | 67.4+3.2 −3.1 L_{☉} |
| Surface gravity (log g) | 3.34±0.14 cgs |
| Temperature | 7,739±263 K |
| Rotational velocity (v sin i) | 222 km/s |
| Age | 356 Myr |

Other designations
- 21 Vul, NU Vul, BD+28° 3675, HD 192518, HIP 99738, HR 7731, SAO 88391

Database references
| SIMBAD | data |

21 Vulpeculae is a single, white-hued star in the northern constellation of Vulpecula. Its distance can be estimated from the annual parallax shift of 10.4302±0.0696 mas, yielding a separation of 313 light years. The star is faintly visible to the naked eye, having an apparent visual magnitude of 5.19. It is moving further away with a heliocentric radial velocity of about +7 km/s, having come within 243 ly (74.53 pc) around 4.2 million years ago.

There is some disagreement about the class of this star. Cowley et al. (1969) listed it as an A-type subgiant star with a stellar classification of A7 IVn, where the 'n' notation indicates "nebulous" lines due to rapid rotation. The luminosity class of IV suggests the star has exhausted the supply of hydrogen at its core and is evolving away from the main sequence. Slettebak (1982) classified it as an A5 IV shell star and it was so regarded by Hauck & Jaschek (2000), while Abt & Morrell (1995) listed it with a class of A5 Vn, indicating a rapidly-rotating A-type main-sequence star. In 1979 Rafael Garrido and Manuel Sáez Cano announced that 21 Vulpeculae is a Delta Scuti type variable star. It has a dominant pulsation period of 0.1881 days and an amplitude of 0.016 in magnitude.

David and Hillenbrand (2015) found an average mass for this star of 1.61 times the mass of the Sun, whereas Zorec and Royer (2012) list a much higher mass estimate of 2.36±0.03 M_{☉}. It is about 356 million years old with a projected rotational velocity of 222 km/s. This rapid rotation is giving the star an oblate shape with an equatorial bulge that is an estimated 16% larger than the polar radius. Observations since 1997 suggest 21 Vul has an orbiting disk of gaseous material that is too equatorially confined to make it a shell star. The line strengths from this disk have been decreasing over time.
