= Hamid M.K. Al-Naimiy =

Prof. Hamid M.K. Al-Naimy
- Born: 8 June 1947 (age 78); Baqubah, Iraq
- Education: Post doctorates, University Of Arizona, 1978

Hamid M. K. Al- Naimiy was up to 2025 Chancellor at the University of Sharjah in the United Arab Emirates as well as professor of astronomy and astrophysics.

== Education ==
- Post doctorates, University of Arizona, 1978.
- PhD Astrophysics, University of Manchester, England 1977.
- MSc Astronomy, University of Manchester, England 1975.
- B.Sc. Physics, University of Baghdad, Iraq 1970 / 1971.

== Awards ==
1. World Education Congress /Asia Award for Outstanding Contribution to Education, 25 September 2011, Dubai, UAE.
2. Khalifa Award for Education 2009/2010 (In the Field of Higher Education). United Arab Emirates.
3. The Certificate of Appreciation from International Astronomical Union & UNESCO for the Outstanding Contribution to the success of the International Year of Astronomy 2009.
4. Korea Astronomy & Space Science Institute Plaque, in recognition of his contribution to the 2009 UN/NASA/ESA/JAXA workshop on Basic Space Sciences and the International Heliophysical Year 2007, 22 September 2009. Daejeon/Korea.
5. NASA Plaque in Recognition of his contributions as the Coordinator for the Asian & Pacific region on IHY2007, for the period 2005 – 2009.
6. UN appreciation letter for the best scientists who contributed excellently in organizing the UN/ESA/NASA workshops. The third UN/ESA/NASA workshop, Tokyo/Japan, 18th – 22nd, May, 2007.
7. Personality of the Week. The International Heliophysical Year IHY2007. On the occasion of the 50 year anniversary for IGY, launching the first world space rocket Sputnik. IHY International Committee, 8 June 2007: http://ihy2007.org/newsroom/weekly_070612.shtml
8. The best scientific public media Publication Prize. The Iraqi Scientific Research Council 1987, Baghdad, Iraq.
9. The best Scientific Researcher Prize. The Iraqi Scientific Research Council 1984, Baghdad, Iraq.

== Publications ==
=== Books ===
- Space Physics, University of Baghdad, Two Volumes.
  - Astronomy 1981
  - Meteorology 1981
- Space Colonies, Cultural & Media Ministry publications, Baghdad – Iraq 1986.
- The International Radio Telescopes, Scientific Research Council publications, Baghdad, Iraq 1987.
- Calculations of the beginning of the lunar months (during the Period 1987 – 2000) Ministry of Awqaf Publications, Baghdad, Iraq, 1988.
- Intelligent life in the Universe. Cultural & Media Ministry publications, Baghdad, Iraq, 1989.
- Exploration of Giant Planets, Cultural & Media Ministry publications, Baghdad, Iraq, 1994.
- The Arab Scientists Achievements in Physics and Astronomy, Cultural & Media Ministry publications, Baghdad, Iraq 1993.
- The Secret of the Universe in the Verses of the Holly Qur'an, Arab Scientific Publishers, Beirut, Lebanon, 2001.
- Proceedings /the 1st International Conference on Astronomy and Space Sciences (4–6 May 1998). The Editor / Publications of Al al-Bayt University, 2000.
- Proceedings /the 9th United Nations/European Space Agency workshops in Basic space Science, (13–17 March 1999). Co-Editor / Publications of Astrophysics of Space science 273/1-4, 2001.
- Priorities of the Iraqi Science and Technology Community, May 2004, in co-operation with ASTF team.
- Editing the Proceedings of the Crescent Visibility problems between Astronomy and Shareah Symposium, Sharjah University Publications, 2006.
- Editing the Special Issue if the International Journal of Scientific Research volume 16. Proceedings of the 1st UAE International Conference on Biological & Medical Physics (27–30 March 2006). The Editor in Chief / Publications of UAE University, 2007.
- Introduction to Astronomy, University Book Shop/Sharjah, UAE and Ithraa Publishing and Distribution / Jordan, 1st Edition 2010.
- The Astronomical calculations and applications in the services of the Islamic Sharea’ah, Brighter Horizon Group/Sharjah, UAE, 1st Edition 2011 .
- The Verses of the Holy Qur'an on the Universe,2016, the Qur’an Dubai awards.
