= 26 Vulpeculae =

Binary star system in the constellation Vulpecula

Observation data Epoch J2000.0 Equinox ICRS
- Constellation: Vulpecula
- Right ascension: 20^{h} 36^{m} 08.3399^{s}
- Declination: +25° 52′ 57.5615″
- Apparent magnitude (V): 6.40

Characteristics
- Spectral type: A5 III
- B−V color index: 0.158±0.005

Astrometry
Radial velocity (R_{v})	−63.4±2.3 km/s
Proper motion (μ)	RA: +26.010 mas/yr Dec.: +12.189 mas/yr
Parallax (π)	5.0684±0.0346 mas
Distance	644 ± 4 ly (197 ± 1 pc)
Absolute magnitude (M_{V})	−0.04

Orbit
Period (P)	11.088 d
Eccentricity (e)	0.28
Periastron epoch (T)	2,426,492.6090 JD
Argument of periastron (ω) (secondary)	50.1°
Semi-amplitude (K_{1}) (primary)	58.7 km/s

Details
Radius	4.6 R_{☉}
Luminosity	79.75 L_{☉}
Temperature	7,888 K
Rotational velocity (v sin i)	15 km/s

Other designations
- 26 Vul, BD+25°4299, HD 196362, HIP 101641, HR 7874, SAO 88884

Database references
SIMBAD	data

26 Vulpeculae is a close binary star system in the northern constellation of Vulpecula, around 644 light years away from the Sun. It is a challenge to view with the naked eye, having an apparent visual magnitude of 6.40. The star is moving closer to the Earth with a heliocentric radial velocity of −63 km/s, and is expected to come within 225 light-years in around 2.6 million years.

This is a single-lined spectroscopic binary with an orbital period of 11 days and an eccentricity of 0.28. The visible component is a suspected chemically peculiar star with a stellar classification of A5 III, suggesting this is an evolved giant star. It has about 4.6 times the Sun's radius and is radiating 80 times the Sun's luminosity from its photosphere at an effective temperature of 7,888 K.
