= 28 Vulpeculae =

Star in the constellation Vulpecula

Observation data Epoch J2000.0 Equinox ICRS
- Constellation: Vulpecula
- Right ascension: 20^{h} 38^{m} 31.9139^{s}
- Declination: +24° 06′ 57.4433″
- Apparent magnitude (V): 5.05

Characteristics
- Evolutionary stage: Subgiant
- Spectral type: B5IV
- U−B color index: −0.53
- B−V color index: −0.14

Astrometry
Radial velocity (R_{v})	−22.6±1.2 km/s
Proper motion (μ)	RA: 10.317±0.273 mas/yr Dec.: −6.940±0.253 mas/yr
Parallax (π)	5.8740±0.1760 mas
Distance	560 ± 20 ly (170 ± 5 pc)
Absolute magnitude (M_{V})	−0.96

Details
Mass	5.0 M_{☉}
Luminosity	713 L_{☉}
Surface gravity (log g)	3.77 cgs
Temperature	15,200 K
Metallicity [Fe/H]	+0.02±0.04 dex
Rotational velocity (v sin i)	285 km/s

Other designations
- 28 Vul, BD+23°4084, HD 196740, HIP 101868, HR 7894, SAO 88945

Database references
SIMBAD	data

28 Vulpeculae is a single star in the northern constellation of Vulpecula. It lies approximately 560 light years away and is visible to the naked eye as a faint, blue-white hued star with an apparent visual magnitude of 5.047. The star is moving closer to the Sun with a heliocentric radial velocity of −23 km/s, and may come as close as 198 light-years in 5.9 million years.

This is a subgiant star with a spectral class of B5 IV, indicating a hot massive star that has started to evolve away from the main sequence after exhausting it core hydrogen. It has been included in a list of the least variable stars observed with the Hipparcos satellite; its brightness varied by no more than 0.0005 magnitudes in the Hipparcos passband. The star has five times the mass of the Sun and is spinning rapidly with a projected rotational velocity of 285 km/s. It is radiating 713 times the Sun's luminosity from its photosphere at an effective temperature of 15,200 K.
