= NQ Vulpeculae =

1976 Nova seen in the constellation Vulpecula

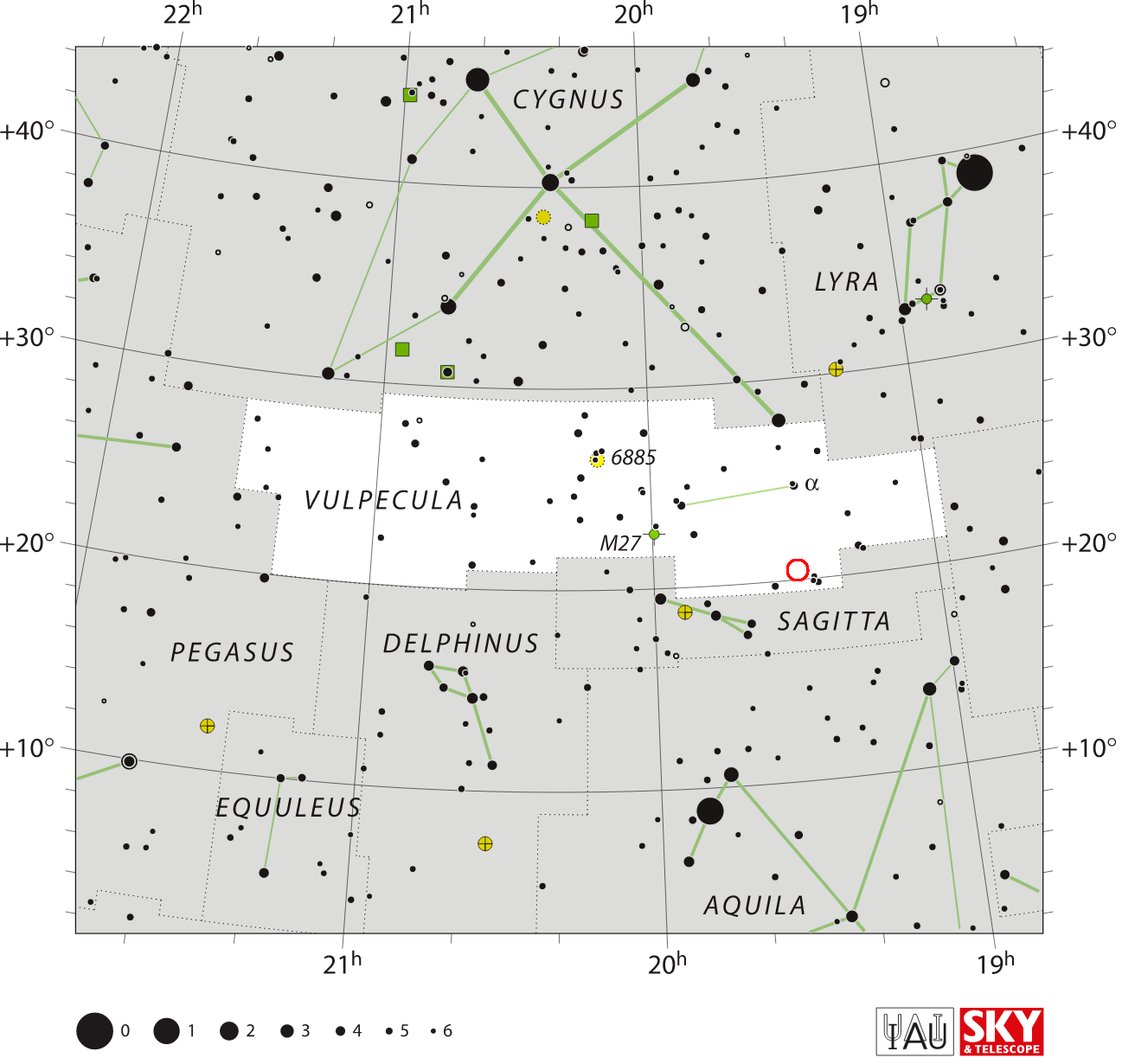
- Location of NQ Vulpeculae (circled in red)

Observation data Epoch J2000 Equinox ICRS
- Constellation: Vulpecula
- Right ascension: 19^{h} 29^{m} 14.752^{s}
- Declination: +20° 27′ 59.57″
- Apparent magnitude (V): 6.0 Max. 18.5 Min.

Characteristics
- Variable type: Classical nova

Astrometry
Proper motion (μ)	RA: 2.593(76) mas/yr Dec.: −3.138(88) mas/yr
Parallax (π)	0.8395±0.0737 mas
Distance	1080+169 −85 pc

Other designations
- AAVSO 1924+20, Nova Vul 1976, 2MASS J19291475+2027596, Gaia DR2 2017742684676480896

Database references
SIMBAD	data

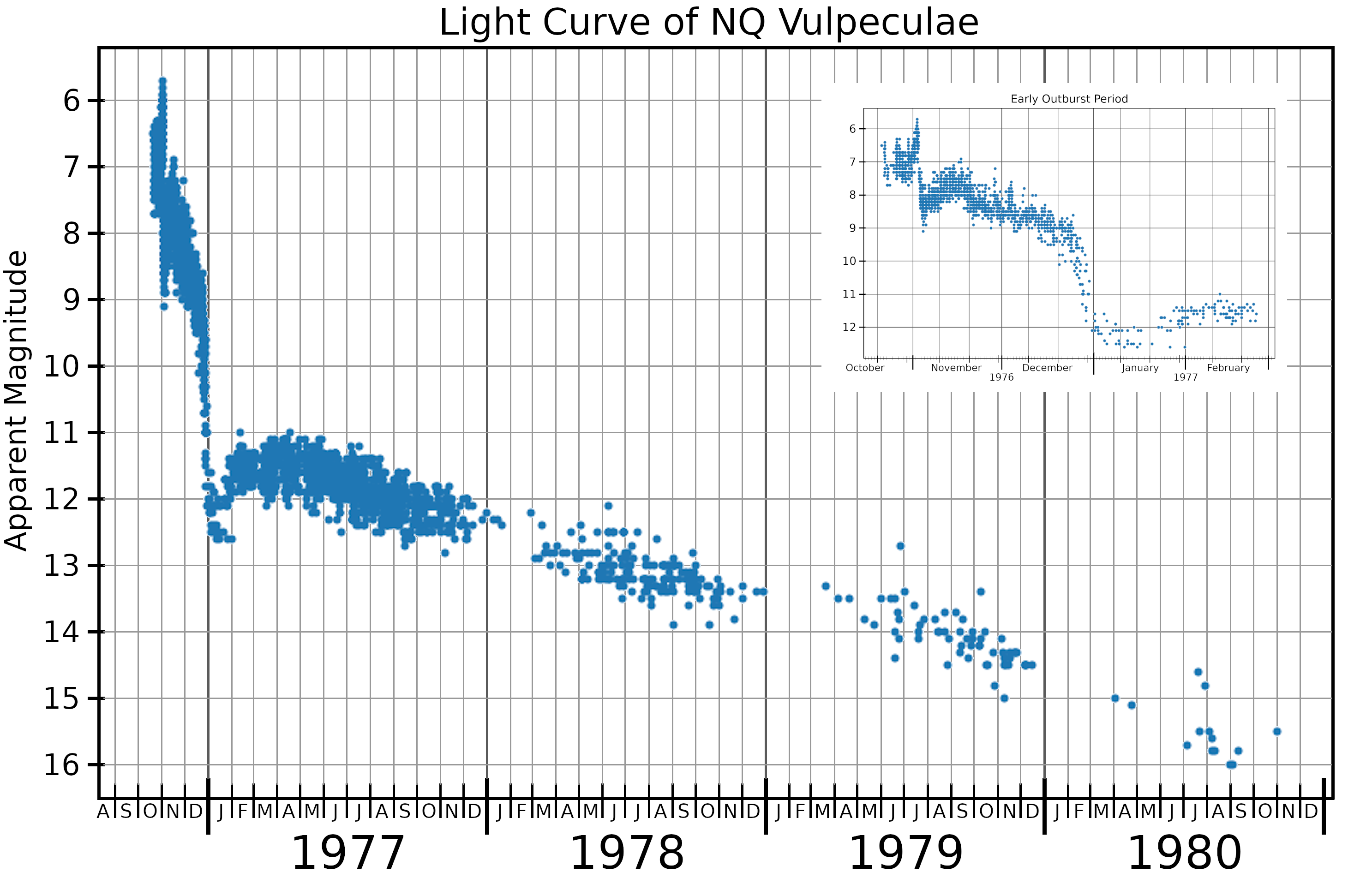
The light curve of NQ Vulpeculae, plotted from AAVSO data

NQ Vulpeculae also known as Nova Vulpeculae 1976, was a nova that appeared in the constellation Vulpecula in 1976. It was discovered visually at 18:20 UT on October 21, 1976 by English amateur astronomer George Alcock. Its apparent magnitude at the time of discovery was 6.5 It reached its maximum brightness of magnitude 6.0 thirteen days after its discovery, at which point it may have been faintly visible to the naked eye. A few days after maximum brightness, it had faded to magnitude 8.3.

NQ Vulpeculae faded by 3 magnitudes from peak brightness in 65 days, which makes it a "moderate speed" nova. It was one of the first novae to be closely monitored near peak brightness in the infrared. The visual light curve went through a local minimum in January 1977 (resulting in its classification as a DQ Herculis-type nova), and at the same time near infrared (3.5 micron) emission peaked, signalling the formation of a dust shell around the nova. The IRAS satellite was launched a little more than six years after NQ Vulpeculae's outburst, and IRAS detected the nova in the 25, 60 and 100 micron bands.

4.9 GHz radio emission was detected in 1984 at the Very Large Array.

All novae are binary stars, with a "donor" star orbiting a white dwarf. The two stars are so close to each other that material is transferred from the donor to the white dwarf. Modelling by Shara et al. in 2018 gave an estimated mass for the white dwarf of 1.10 M_{☉}, and a mass transfer rate of 1.5 × 10^{−9} M_{☉} yr^{−1}. The orbital period of NQ Vulpeculae is 0.146501 days, or approximately 3 hours and 31 minutes.

In 1993 a small nearly circular nova remnant was imaged in Hα line emission with the William Herschel Telescope. On the raw image its radius was about 4 arc seconds, but deconvolution resulted in a ring-like image with a radius of 1.5 arc seconds, and a width of 0.5 arc seconds.
