= 12 Vulpeculae =

Star in the constellation Vulpecula

- Location of 12 Vulpeculae (circled)

Observation data Epoch J2000 Equinox J2000
- Constellation: Vulpecula
- Right ascension: 19^{h} 51^{m} 04.1083^{s}
- Declination: +22° 36′ 36.173″
- Apparent magnitude (V): 4.78 - 4.97

Characteristics
- Evolutionary stage: main sequence
- Spectral type: B2.5V
- Apparent magnitude (U): 4.104±0.020
- Apparent magnitude (B): 4.759±0.017
- Variable type: Be star

Astrometry
Radial velocity (R_{v})	−24.90 km/s
Proper motion (μ)	RA: 23.404±0.068 mas/yr Dec.: −15.797±0.099 mas/yr
Parallax (π)	5.1710±0.1070 mas
Distance	630 ± 10 ly (193 ± 4 pc)
Absolute magnitude (M_{V})	−1.52

Details
Mass	6.8 M_{☉}
Luminosity	963 L_{☉}
Surface gravity (log g)	3.36 cgs
Temperature	18,859 K
Metallicity [Fe/H]	−0.01 dex
Rotational velocity (v sin i)	195 km/s

Other designations
- 12 Vul, V395 Vul, BD+22°3833, FK5 3585, GC 27493, HD 187811, HIP 97679, HR 7565, SAO 87813

Database references
SIMBAD	data

12 Vulpeculae is a star in the northern constellation of Vulpecula, located approximately 630 light years away based on parallax. It has the variable star designation V395 Vul; 12 Vulpeculae is the Flamsteed designation. This object is visible to the naked eye as a faint, blue-white hued star with an apparent visual magnitude of about 4.9. It is moving closer to the Earth with a heliocentric radial velocity of -25 km/s.

This is a variable Be star with a stellar classification of B2.5V; its brightness ranges from magnitude 4.78 down to 4.97. As is true with other Be stars, it has a high rate of rotation with a projected rotational velocity of 195 km/s. The star has 6.8 times the mass of the Sun and is radiating 963 times the Sun's luminosity from its photosphere at an effective temperature of 18,859 K.
