= 32 Vulpeculae =

Star in the constellation Vulpecula

Observation data Epoch J2000.0 Equinox ICRS
- Constellation: Vulpecula
- Right ascension: 20^{h} 54^{m} 33.63918^{s}
- Declination: +28° 03′ 27.4453″
- Apparent magnitude (V): 5.03 (4.99–5.06)

Characteristics
- Evolutionary stage: red giant branch
- Spectral type: K4 III
- B−V color index: 1.480
- Variable type: suspected

Astrometry
Radial velocity (R_{v})	+5.7±0.6 km/s
Proper motion (μ)	RA: −3.665±0.099 mas/yr Dec.: −1.154±0.109 mas/yr
Parallax (π)	5.3203±0.1035 mas
Distance	610 ± 10 ly (188 ± 4 pc)
Absolute magnitude (M_{V})	−1.76

Details
Radius	54.29+1.69 −3.42 R_{☉}
Luminosity	708.4±19.5 L_{☉}
Surface gravity (log g)	1.74 cgs
Temperature	4,041+134 −61 K
Metallicity [Fe/H]	−0.16 dex
Rotational velocity (v sin i)	8.1 km/s

Other designations
- 32 Vul, NSV 13398, AAVSO 2050+27, BD+27° 3911, FK5 786, GC 29178, HD 199169, HIP 103200, HR 8008, SAO 89272

Database references
SIMBAD	data

32 Vulpeculae is a single star located around 610 light years away from the Sun in the northern constellation Vulpecula, a few degrees south of the border with Cygnus. It is visible to the naked eye as a faint, orange-hued star with a typical apparent visual magnitude of 5.03. This object is drifting further away from the Earth with a heliocentric radial velocity of +6 km/s.

This is an aging red giant star with a stellar classification of K4 III, having exhausted the supply of hydrogen at its core then expanded to 54 times the Sun's radius. It is a suspected variable of unknown type, with a visual magnitude that has been measured ranging from 4.99 down to 5.06. The star is radiating 708 times the luminosity of the Sun from its enlarged photosphere at an effective temperature of 4,041 K.
