= 19 Vulpeculae =

Star in the constellation Vulpecula

Observation data Epoch J2000.0 Equinox ICRS
- Constellation: Vulpecula
- Right ascension: 20^{h} 11^{m} 47.9738^{s}
- Declination: 26° 48′ 32.374″
- Apparent magnitude (V): 5.40

Characteristics
- Spectral type: K2 IIIa
- B−V color index: 1.40

Astrometry
| Radial velocity (R_{v}) | −19.33±0.11 km/s |
| Proper motion (μ) | RA: 1.619±0.119 mas/yr Dec.: −10.600±0.122 mas/yr |
| Parallax (π) | 1.9328±0.0779 mas |
| Distance | 1,690 ± 70 ly (520 ± 20 pc) |
| Absolute magnitude (M_{V}) | −2.60 |

Details
| Mass | 4.94±0.53 M_{☉} |
| Radius | 100.3+1.7 −3.0 R_{☉} |
| Luminosity | 2,889±145 L_{☉} |
| Surface gravity (log g) | 1.40 cgs |
| Temperature | 4,200 K |
| Metallicity [Fe/H] | −0.01 dex |
| Rotational velocity (v sin i) | < 3.4 km/s |

Other designations
- 19 Vul, BD+26° 3825, HD 192004, HIP 99518, HR 7718, SAO 88330

Database references
| SIMBAD | data |

19 Vulpeculae is star located approximately 1,690 light years from Earth in the northern constellation of Vulpecula. It is a probable member of the open cluster NGC 6882. This object is visible to the naked eye as a faint, orange-hued star with an apparent visual magnitude of 5.40. It is moving closer to the Earth with a heliocentric radial velocity of −19 km/s.

This is an aging giant star with a stellar classification of K2 IIIa, having already consumed the hydrogen at its core and evolved away from the main sequence. It has nearly five times the mass of the Sun but has expanded to around 100 times the Sun's radius. The star is radiating 2,889 times the Sun's luminosity from its enlarged photosphere at an effective temperature of 4,200 K.
