= 30 Vulpeculae =

Star in the constellation Vulpecula

- Location of 30 Vulpeculae (circled)

Observation data Epoch J2000 Equinox ICRS
- Constellation: Vulpecula
- Right ascension: 20^{h} 44^{m} 52.50423^{s}
- Declination: 25° 16′ 14.2538″
- Apparent magnitude (V): 4.91

Characteristics
- Spectral type: K1 III
- U−B color index: +1.18
- B−V color index: +1.19

Astrometry
Radial velocity (R_{v})	+30.00 km/s
Proper motion (μ)	RA: −30.988 mas/yr Dec.: −184.648 mas/yr
Parallax (π)	9.3255±0.1537 mas
Distance	350 ± 6 ly (107 ± 2 pc)
Absolute magnitude (M_{V})	−0.07

Orbit
Period (P)	2,506±4 d
Eccentricity (e)	0.383±0.023
Periastron epoch (T)	42511±29 MJD
Argument of periastron (ω) (secondary)	272±5°
Semi-amplitude (K_{1}) (primary)	4.69±0.13 km/s

Details
Mass	1.55 M_{☉}
Radius	21.68+0.47 −0.63 R_{☉}
Luminosity	173.3±3.3 L_{☉}
Surface gravity (log g)	2.47 cgs
Temperature	4,498+67 −48 K
Metallicity [Fe/H]	−0.10 dex
Rotational velocity (v sin i)	1.5 km/s
Age	4.20 Gyr

Other designations
- 30 Vul, BD+24°4229, FK5 3657, GC 28920, HD 197752, HIP 102388, HR 7939, SAO 89084

Database references
SIMBAD	data

30 Vulpeculae is a binary star system in the northern constellation of Vulpecula, located mid-way between Epsilon Cygni and a diamond-shaped asterism in Delphinus. It is visible to the naked eye as a faint, orange-hued point of light with an apparent visual magnitude of 4.91. The system is located approximately 350 light years away from the Sun based on parallax, and is drifting further away with a mean radial velocity of +30 km/s. The system has a relatively high proper motion, traversing the celestial sphere at the rate of 0.186 arc seconds per annum.

The variable radial velocity of this system was announced in 1922 by W. W. Campbell. It is a single-lined spectroscopic binary system with an orbital period of 6.86 years and an eccentricity of 0.38. The a sin i value is 149 ± 4 Gm (1.00 ± 0.03 AU), where a is the semimajor axis and i is the orbital inclination. This provides a lower bound on the true semimajor axis.

The visible component is an aging giant star with a stellar classification of K1 III and an estimated age of 4.20 billion years old. Having exhausted the supply of hydrogen at its core, the star has expanded to 22 times the Sun's radius. It has 1.55 times the mass of the Sun and is radiating 173 times the Sun's luminosity from its swollen photosphere at an effective temperature of 4,498 K.
