= 22 Vulpeculae =

Binary star system in the constellation Vulpecula

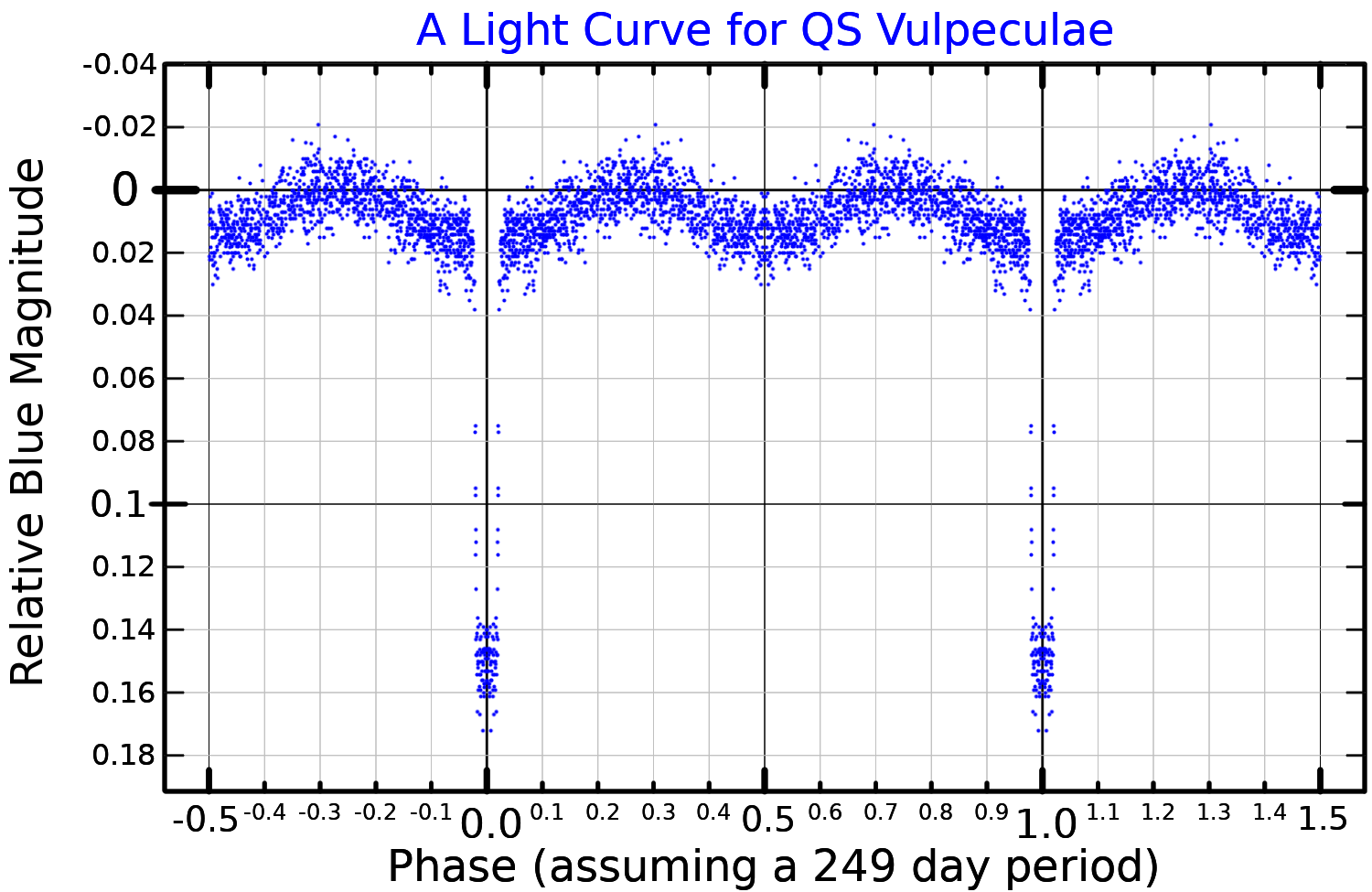
- A blue band light curve for QS Vulpeculae, adapted from Eaton and Shaw (2007)

Observation data Epoch J2000.0 Equinox ICRS
- Constellation: Vulpecula
- Right ascension: 20^{h} 15^{m} 30.2386^{s}
- Declination: +23° 30′ 32.051″
- Apparent magnitude (V): 5.15

Characteristics
- Spectral type: G9Ib-II + B8V
- U−B color index: +1.03
- B−V color index: +0.68
- Variable type: Algol

Astrometry
Radial velocity (R_{v})	−22.8±0.9 km/s
Proper motion (μ)	RA: 2.852±0.067 mas/yr Dec.: −7.278±0.071 mas/yr
Parallax (π)	2.1872±0.0850 mas
Distance	1,490 ± 60 ly (460 ± 20 pc)
Absolute magnitude (M_{V})	−3.67 (−3.5 / −0.1)

Orbit
Period (P)	249.18±0.010 d
Eccentricity (e)	0.011
Inclination (i)	81.34±0.02°
Argument of periastron (ω) (secondary)	0 (assumed)°
Semi-amplitude (K_{1}) (primary)	27.10±0.21 km/s
Semi-amplitude (K_{2}) (secondary)	40.0±1.0 km/s

Details

primary
Mass	4.649 M_{☉}
Radius	96 R_{☉}
Luminosity	2,188 L_{☉}
Temperature	4,699 K
Rotation	142 - 165 days
Rotational velocity (v sin i)	16 - 20 km/s

secondary
Mass	3.150 M_{☉}
Radius	3.4 R_{☉}
Luminosity	123 L_{☉}
Temperature	11,995 K
Age	135.1 Myr

Other designations
- QS Vul, BD+23 3944, HD 192713, HIP 99853, HR 7741, SAO 88416

Database references
SIMBAD	data

22 Vulpeculae, also called QS Vulpeculae, is a binary star system in the northern constellation Vulpecula. Based on its parallax, it is located some 1,490 light-years away, and it has an apparent magnitude of about 5.2, making it visible to the naked eye. The system is moving closer to the Earth with a heliocentric radial velocity of −23 km/s.

The pair have an orbital period of 249 d in an almost-circular orbit. The primary component is a G-type bright giant. It is over four times as massive as the Sun, and over 96 times as wide. Its companion is a B-type main-sequence star, 3.4 times as massive as the Sun. Although the secondary has an effective temperature of nearly 12,000 K and the primary just 4,700 K, the large size of the cooler star means it is nearly 20 times as luminous at 2,200 L_{☉}. The primary star is rotating slowly with a rotation period that appears to be between about 140 and 165 days, unexpectedly faster than the orbital period. Different parts of its atmosphere may be rotating at different speeds. The hot secondary is rotating much faster, possibly at 350 km/s.

Sidney Parsons and Thomas Abe discovered that 22 Vulpeculae is a variable star, in 1983. The two stars have an orbit that is oriented in such a way that they periodically eclipse each other, each star alternately blocking the light of the other. For that, it was given the variable star designation QS Vulpeculae in 1985; 22 Vulpeculae is the Flamsteed designation. The maximum drop in visual apparent magnitude is 0.05 magnitudes when the hot secondary is completely hidden by the large cool primary. The eclipses are deeper at shorter wavelengths because a greater proportion of the short-wavelength radiation comes from the hot star. The primary eclipses last for eight days at visual wavelengths, but partial phases can be detected for up to 17 days at ultraviolet wavelengths due to the expanded atmosphere and wind of the primary star. Secondary eclipse, where the hot star transits the cooler one, are undetectable, and ellipsoidal variations due to distortion of the large primary produce brightness changes of less than 1.5%.
