= 29 Vulpeculae =

Binary star system in the constellation Vulpecula

- Location of 29 Vulpeculae (circled)

Observation data Epoch J2000 Equinox ICRS
- Constellation: Vulpecula
- Right ascension: 20^{h} 38^{m} 31.32904^{s}
- Declination: 21° 12′ 04.3763″
- Apparent magnitude (V): 4.82

Characteristics
- Evolutionary stage: main sequence
- Spectral type: A0V
- U−B color index: −0.07
- B−V color index: −0.02

Astrometry
Radial velocity (R_{v})	−17.10 km/s
Proper motion (μ)	RA: +78.741 mas/yr Dec.: −4.572 mas/yr
Parallax (π)	15.6257±0.3374 mas
Distance	209 ± 5 ly (64 ± 1 pc)
Absolute magnitude (M_{V})	0.56

Details
Mass	2.67 M_{☉}
Luminosity	71 L_{☉}
Surface gravity (log g)	4.20 cgs
Temperature	10,507 K
Metallicity [Fe/H]	−0.15 dex
Rotational velocity (v sin i)	52 km/s
Age	254 Myr

Other designations
- 29 Vul, BD+20°4658, FK5 1539, HD 196724, HIP 101867, HR 7891, SAO 88944

Database references
SIMBAD	data

29 Vulpeculae is a suspected astrometric binary star system in the northern constellation Vulpecula. It is visible to the naked eye as a faint, white-hued point of light with an apparent visual magnitude of 4.82. The system lies approximately 209 light years away from the Sun based on parallax, and is a member of the IC 2391 supercluster. It is moving closer to the Earth with a heliocentric radial velocity of −17 km/s.

Radial velocity measurements from High Accuracy Radial Velocity Planet Searcher with an amplitude of 4 km/s indicate that it is a spectroscopic binary of unknown period. The visible component is an A-type main-sequence star with a stellar classification of A0V, and has some slight abundance anomalies that resemble a weak Am star. It is catalogued as a shell star, showing spectral features of a cooler circumstellar jacket of gas, and may be a proto-shell star. The star is an estimated 254 million years old with a relatively low projected rotational velocity of 52 km/s. It has 2.67 times the mass of the Sun and is radiating 71 times the Sun's luminosity from its photosphere at an effective temperature of 10,507 K.
