= 33 Vulpeculae =

Star in the constellation Vulpecula

Observation data Epoch J2000 Equinox J2000
- Constellation: Vulpecula
- Right ascension: 20^{h} 58^{m} 16.34942^{s}
- Declination: +22° 19′ 33.2638″
- Apparent magnitude (V): 5.31

Characteristics
- Spectral type: K3.5 III
- B−V color index: 1.419±0.005

Astrometry
| Radial velocity (R_{v}) | −25.23±0.24 km/s |
| Proper motion (μ) | RA: −2.327 mas/yr Dec.: −4.511 mas/yr |
| Parallax (π) | 6.5257±0.1689 mas |
| Distance | 500 ± 10 ly (153 ± 4 pc) |
| Absolute magnitude (M_{V}) | −0.41 |

Details
| Radius | 35.34+1.13 −2.22 R_{☉} |
| Luminosity | 333.7±9.9 L_{☉} |
| Surface gravity (log g) | 1.91 cgs |
| Temperature | 4,070 K |
| Metallicity [Fe/H] | −0.12 dex |

Other designations
- 33 Vul, BD+21° 4424, FK5 1549, HD 199697, HIP 103511, HR 8032, SAO 89332

Database references
| SIMBAD | data |

33 Vulpeculae is a single star located around 500 light-years away from the Sun in the northern constellation of Vulpecula. It is visible to the naked eye as a dim, orange-hued star with an apparent visual magnitude of 5.31. The object is drifting closer to the Earth with a heliocentric radial velocity of −25 km/s.

This is an evolved giant star with a stellar classification of K3.5 III, having exhausted the supply of hydrogen at it its core and expanded to 35 times the Sun's radius. It serves as a spectral standard for stars of its particular class. This star is radiating 334 times the luminosity of the Sun from its enlarged photosphere at an effective temperature of 4,070 K.
