= QU Vulpeculae =

1984 Nova seen in the constellation Vulpecula

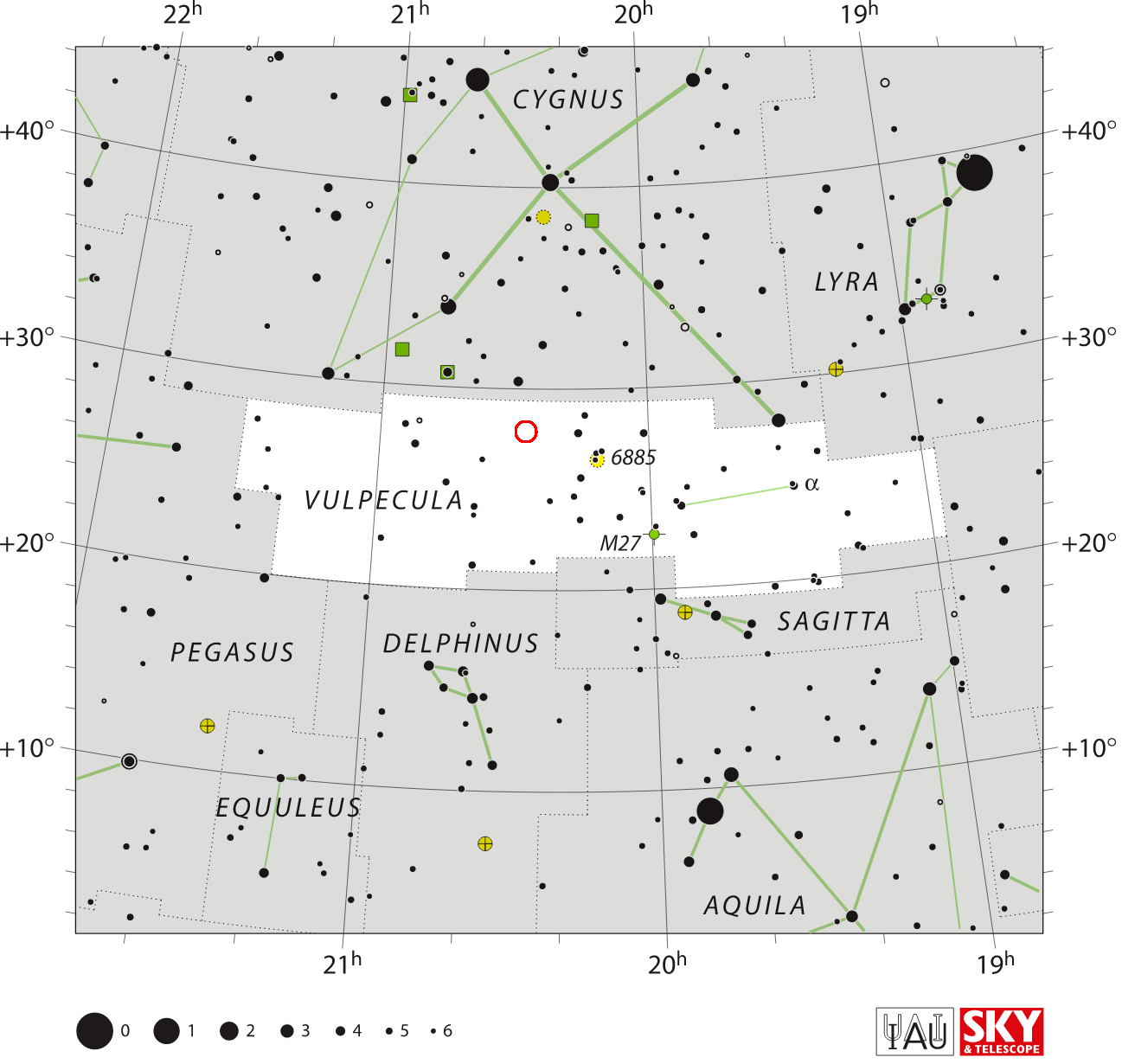
- Location of QU Vulpeculae (circled in red)

Observation data Epoch J2000 Equinox ICRS
- Constellation: Vulpecula
- Right ascension: 20^{h} 26^{m} 46.020^{s}
- Declination: +27° 50′ 43.16″
- Apparent magnitude (V): 5.3 Max. 17.9 Min.

Astrometry
Proper motion (μ)	RA: 1.325±0.509 mas/yr Dec.: −3.125±0.522 mas/yr
Parallax (π)	0.7392±0.3657 mas
Distance	1786+3495 −196 pc

Characteristics
- Variable type: Classical Nova, eclipsing binary

Other designations
- AAVSO 2022+27, Gaia DR2 1860040595206017664, Nova Vul 1984 b, Nova Vul 2

Database references
SIMBAD	data

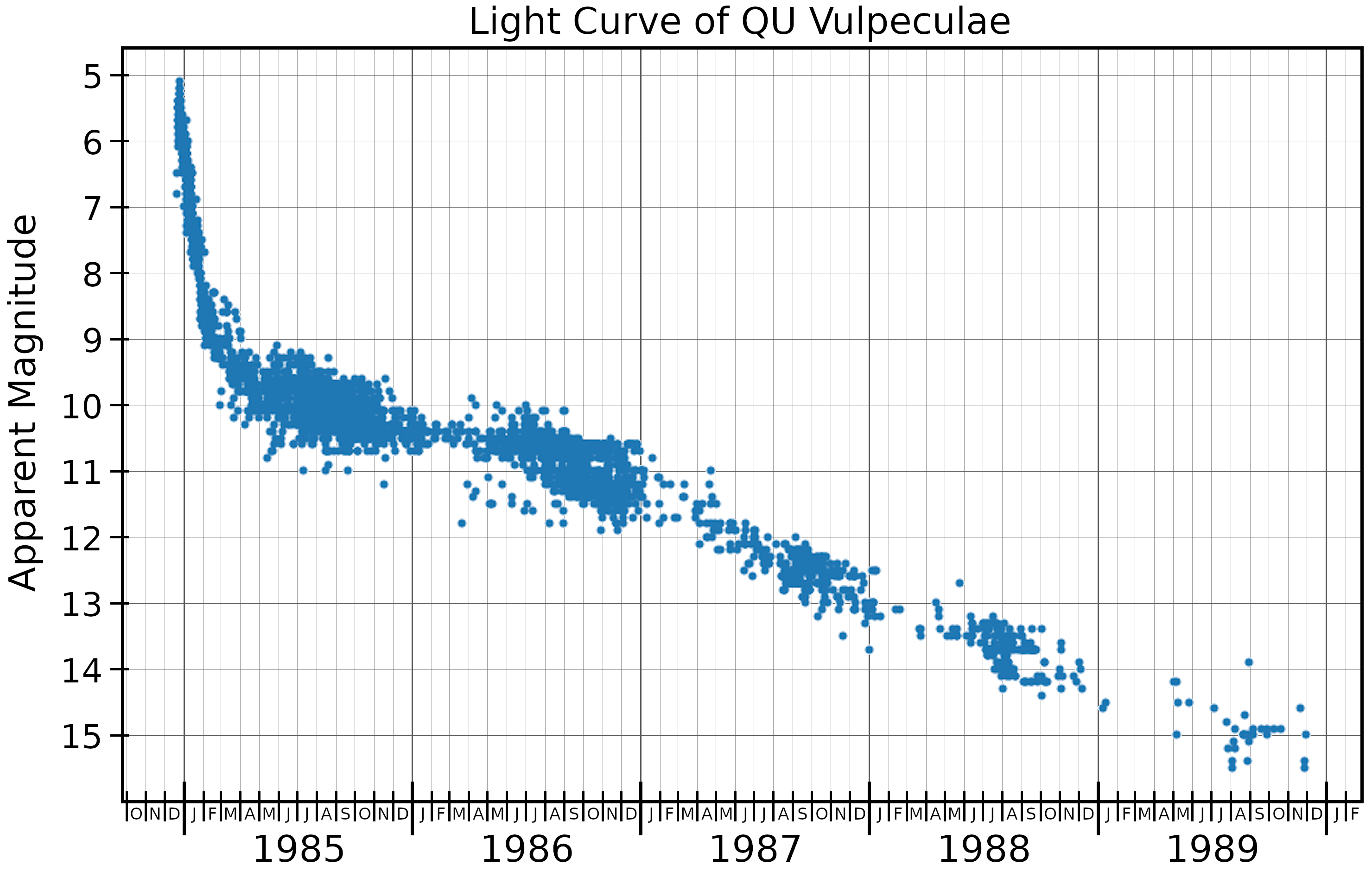
The light curve of QU Vulpeculae, plotted from AAVSO data

QU Vulpeculae, also known as Nova Vulpeculae 1984 Number 2, was the second nova which occurred in 1984 in the constellation Vulpecula (PW Vulpeculae was the first). It was discovered by Peter Collins, an amateur astronomer from Cardiff, California at 22:08 UT on 22 December 1984. At the time of its discovery, the nova's apparent magnitude was 6.8. By the next night, Collins reported its brightness had increased to magnitude 5.6, making it visible to the naked eye.

QU Vulpeculae declined from peak brightness quite rapidly, and had faded by 3 magnitudes in just 40 days, so it is classified as a "fast" nova.

All nova are binary stars, with a "donor" star orbiting a white dwarf. The two stars are so close to each other that material is transferred from the donor to the white dwarf. Since the two stars are separated by a distance comparable to the radius of the donor star, novae are often found to be eclipsing binaries, and QU Vulpeculae shows such eclipses. The eclipses produce a ~0.5 magnitude brightness drop, and they allow the orbital period, 2.68 hours, to be measured. This is an unusual orbital period for a cataclysmic variable star, falling within the "period gap" between 2 and 3 hours.

A few months after the nova eruption, infrared spectroscopy revealed extremely strong emission in the 12.8 micron forbidden transition of singly ionized neon. It was the strongest emission in that spectral transition, relative to the source's continuum, that had ever been observed in an astronomical source. QU Vulpeculae is an ONeMg neon nova, a nova with an oxygen-neon-magnesium white dwarf primary. A neon nova white dwarf is unusually massive, having a mass ≥ 1.2 M_{☉}, approaching the Chandrasekhar limit. However estimates of current mass of QU Vulpeculae's white dwarf are lower than this, which has led to suggestions that the white dwarf has lost some of its initial mass as a result of the nova outbursts. It is believed that white dwarfs of this type are the remnants of main sequence stars with initial masses of 8 to 12 M_{☉}.

In the summer of 1985, QU Vulpeculae was detected in all four of the observing bands (1.49, 4.89, 14.94 and 22.46 GHz) available at that time at the Very Large Array. It was the first nova that was imaged shortly after its outburst in the radio regime, and multi-epoch observations showed that the ejecta was expanding.

QU Vulpeculae is surrounded by a nova remnant, a planetary nebula-like shell of the material that was ejected during its outburst. Its remnant appears roughly spherical. In 2020, its radius was measured to be about 2.1 arcseconds, meaning the shell has been expanding at a rate of about 0.058 arcseconds per year.
