= 18 Vulpeculae =

Star in the constellation Vulpecula

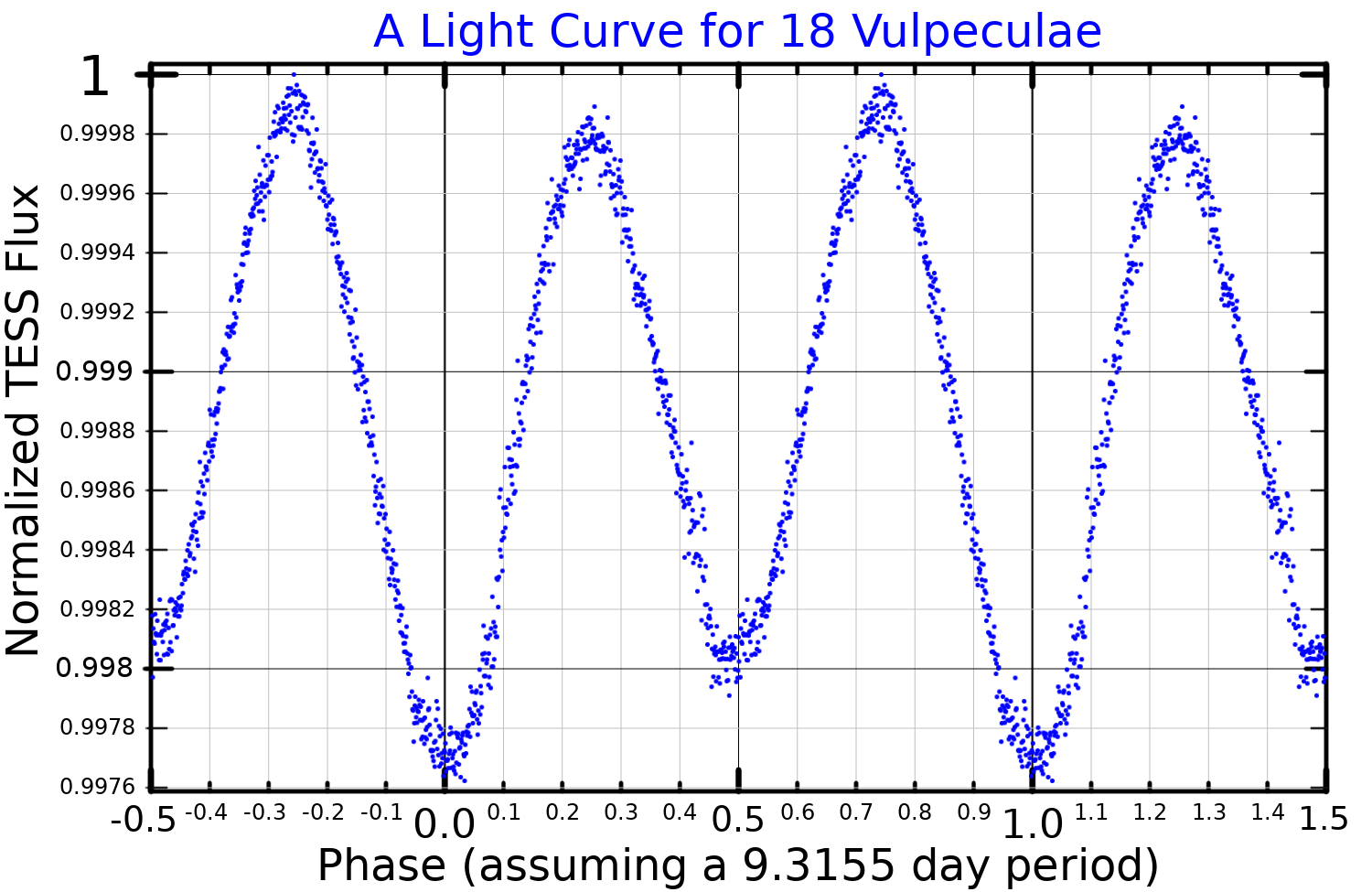
- A light curve for 18 Vulpeculae, plotted from TESS data,

Observation data Epoch J2000.0 Equinox ICRS
- Constellation: Vulpecula
- Right ascension: 20^{h} 10^{m} 33.53707^{s}
- Declination: +26° 54′ 15.0033″
- Apparent magnitude (V): 5.51

Characteristics
- Spectral type: A3III or A3V
- B−V color index: 0.087±0.003
- Variable type: δ Sct, EL

Astrometry
Radial velocity (R_{v})	−11.70±0.11 km/s
Proper motion (μ)	RA: 18.785±0.164 mas/yr Dec.: 12.694±0.172 mas/yr
Parallax (π)	6.6678±0.1098 mas
Distance	489 ± 8 ly (150 ± 2 pc)
Absolute magnitude (M_{V})	−0.05

Orbit
Period (P)	9.314077±0.000039 d
Eccentricity (e)	0.0116±0.0019
Periastron epoch (T)	2454875.09±0.25 HJD
Argument of periastron (ω) (secondary)	319.4±0.97°
Semi-amplitude (K_{1}) (primary)	78.33±0.13 km/s
Semi-amplitude (K_{2}) (secondary)	82.80±0.29 km/s

Details

18 Vul A
Mass	2.4 M_{☉}
Radius	3.5±0.3 R_{☉}
Surface gravity (log g)	3.73±0.07 cgs
Temperature	8300±300 K

18 Vul B
Mass	2.2 M_{☉}
Radius	2.4±0.2 R_{☉}

Other designations
- BD+26 3815, HD 191747, HIP 99404, HR 7711, SAO 88295

Database references
SIMBAD	data

18 Vulpeculae is a binary star system in the northern constellation of Vulpecula, located about 489 light years away from the Sun. It is visible to the naked eye as a faint, white-hued star with a combined apparent visual magnitude of 5.51. The system is moving closer to the Earth with a heliocentric radial velocity of −11.7 km/s.

This is a double-lined spectroscopic binary system with an orbital period of 9.3 days and a small eccentricity of 0.0116. It is a detached binary with a semimajor axis of 0.14742 ± 0.00047 AU. The system contains a Delta Scuti variable, but the temperature places it to the blue (hotter) side of the δ Scuti instability strip. The AAVSO classifies it as a rotating ellipsoidal variable. The combined stellar classification of this system remains unclear, with classes of A3 III, A1 IV, A3 V, and A2 IV being given. The ultraviolet spectrum matches an A3 dwarf star. It shows no spectral peculiarities.
