= Wolf 1346 =

Star in the constellation Vulpecula

- Location of Wolf 1346 (circled)

Observation data Epoch J2000.0 Equinox ICRS
- Constellation: Vulpecula
- Right ascension: 20^{h} 34^{m} 21.88470^{s}
- Declination: +25° 03′ 49.7504″
- Apparent magnitude (V): 11.546

Characteristics
- Evolutionary stage: White dwarf
- Spectral type: DA2.4
- U−B color index: −0.784
- B−V color index: −0.075
- J−H color index: −0.033
- J−K color index: −0.147

Astrometry
Radial velocity (R_{v})	71.0±7.4 km/s
Proper motion (μ)	RA: −403.387 mas/yr Dec.: −563.404 mas/yr
Parallax (π)	67.4085±0.0367 mas
Distance	48.39 ± 0.03 ly (14.835 ± 0.008 pc)
Absolute magnitude (M_{V})	+10.58

Details
Mass	0.636±0.005 M_{☉}
Radius	0.0139±0.0006 R_{☉}
Luminosity	0.0332+0.0056 −0.0048 L_{☉}
Surface gravity (log g)	8.015±0.006 cgs
Temperature	21608±153 K
Age	60 (Note: This is just the cooling age.) Myr

Other designations
- GJ 794, HD 340611, HIP 101516, AC +25°68981, G 186-31, LAWD 82, LFT 1554, LHS 3562, LSPM J2034+2503, LTT 16005, NLTT 49494, PLX 4895.00, PM 20322+2454, PM J20343+2503, WD 2032+248, Wolf 1346, TIC 298186852, TYC 2161-1038-1, GCRV 12872, 2MASS J20342188+2503498, WISEA J203421.56+250343.8, Gaia DR2 1831553382794173824

Database references
SIMBAD	data

Wolf 1346, otherwise known as HD 340611 and WD 2032+248, is a star in the northern constellation of Vulpecula. With an apparent magnitude of 11.546, it is too faint to be seen by the naked eye but can be observed using a telescope with an aperture of 51 mm (2.0 in) or larger. It is located at a distance of approximately 48.4 light-years (14.8 pc) according to Gaia EDR3 parallax measurements, and is receding from the Sun at a heliocentric radial velocity of +71.0 km/s.

== Properties ==
This is a young, non-magnetic white dwarf with an age of 60 million years. It is a little less than two-thirds the mass of the Sun and just 1.4% the radius, that is 1.5 times the size of Earth or 9,670 km (6,010 mi). With an effective temperature of 21,608 K (21,335 °C; 38,435 °F), it shines with 3.3% of the Sun's luminosity. It belongs to the thin disk of the Milky Way. There is marginal indication that the star is orbited by a binary companion.

It has the spectral type DA2.4, indicating that the atmosphere is dominated by hydrogen, which is the only element whose spectral lines show up in the star's visible spectrum. It has been subject to multiple ultraviolet spectroscopic observations. Silicon lines were discovered in 1984 from spectra obtained by the International Ultraviolet Explorer. The abundance of silicon in the photosphere has been measured at log(Si/H)=−7.5 ± 0.2, which, compared to the solar value of log(Si/H)=−4.5, is approximately one thousand times less. This amount is comparable to what is expected from radiative levitation. Carbon, nitrogen, and oxygen are absent in the spectra, consistent with theories of element diffusion. Observations by the Hopkins Ultraviolet Telescope revealed that the Lyman-beta line shows signs of the dihydrogen cation (H_{2}^{+}), which, in cooler DA white dwarfs, causes similar signatures in the Lyman-alpha line.
