= 9 Vulpeculae =

Star in the constellation Vulpecula

- Location of 9 Vulpeculae (circled)

Observation data Epoch J2000 Equinox J2000
- Constellation: Vulpecula
- Right ascension: 19^{h} 34^{m} 34.89705^{s}
- Declination: 19° 46′ 24.2423″
- Apparent magnitude (V): 5.010±0.009 (4.99 - 5.08)

Characteristics
- Spectral type: B8 IIIn
- Apparent magnitude (U): 4.499±0.012
- Apparent magnitude (B): 4.906±0.011
- Variable type: suspected

Astrometry
Radial velocity (R_{v})	+5.00 km/s
Proper motion (μ)	RA: +13.148 mas/yr Dec.: +5.142 mas/yr
Parallax (π)	5.8317±0.1242 mas
Distance	560 ± 10 ly (171 ± 4 pc)
Absolute magnitude (M_{V})	−1.14

Details
Mass	3.5 M_{☉}
Radius	2.8 R_{☉}
Luminosity	216 L_{☉}
Surface gravity (log g)	3,54 cgs
Temperature	12,042 K
Metallicity [Fe/H]	−0.03 dex
Rotational velocity (v sin i)	185 km/s
Age	185 Myr

Other designations
- 9 Vul, NSV 12173, BD+19°4063, GC 27047, HD 184606, HIP 96275, HR 7437, SAO 104990, WDS J19346+1946A

Database references
SIMBAD	data

9 Vulpeculae is a star in the northern constellation of Vulpecula, located about 560 light years away based on parallax. It is visible to the naked eye as a faint, blue-white hued star with a baseline apparent visual magnitude of 5.01. The star is moving further from the Earth with a heliocentric radial velocity of +5 km/s.

This a B-type star with a stellar classification of B8 IIIn, where the 'n' notation indicates "nebulous" lines due to rapid rotation. It has a high rate of spin with a projected rotational velocity of 185 km/s. The star is radiating 216 times the Sun's luminosity from its photosphere at an effective temperature of 12,042 K. This is a suspected variable star of unknown type, ranging in magnitude from 4.99 down to 5.08.

9 Vulpeculae has two reported companions: component B, with a separation of 9.3" and magnitude 13.4, and C, with a separation of 108" and a magnitude of 12.5". Both are unrelated background objects.
