= QQ Vulpeculae =

Variable star in the constellation Vulpecula

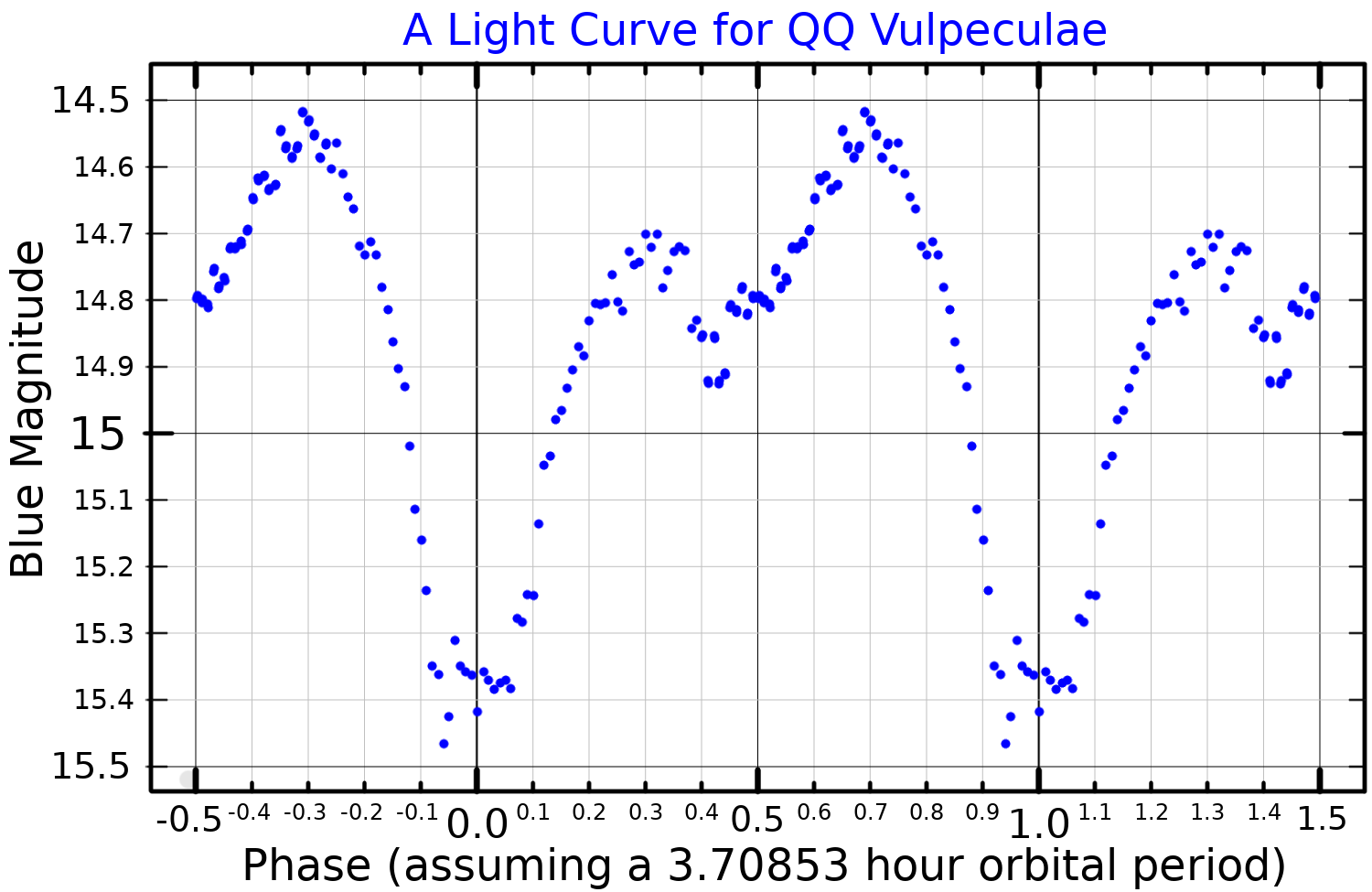
- A blue band light curve for QQ Vulpeculae, adapted from Nousek et al. (1984)

Observation data Epoch J2000 Equinox ICRS
- Constellation: Vulpecula
- Right ascension: 20^{h} 05^{m} 41.909^{s}
- Declination: 22° 39′ 58.84″
- Apparent magnitude (V): 14.656

Characteristics
- Evolutionary stage: white dwarf + red dwarf
- Spectral type: M4V
- Apparent magnitude (B): 14.4 to 17.0
- Variable type: Polar

Astrometry
Proper motion (μ)	RA: −3.249 mas/yr Dec.: −14.882 mas/yr
Parallax (π)	3.3235±0.0286 mas
Distance	981 ± 8 ly (301 ± 3 pc)

Orbit
Period (P)	0.1545217±0.0000022 d
Semi-major axis (a)	1.14±0.12 R_{☉}
Eccentricity (e)	0.00
Inclination (i)	≥ 72°
Periastron epoch (T)	2,445,234.8364±0.0018 JD
Semi-amplitude (K_{1}) (primary)	369.00 km/s
Semi-amplitude (K_{2}) (secondary)	219±6 km/s

Details

White dwarf
Mass	0.58–0.66 M_{☉}
Radius	0.01 R_{☉}

Donor star
Mass	0.34–0.44 M_{☉}
Radius	0.35±0.10 R_{☉}
Rotational velocity (v sin i)	110±15 km/s

Other designations
- E 2003+225, QQ Vul, IRAS J20054191+2239587

Database references
SIMBAD	data

QQ Vulpeculae is a cataclysmic variable binary star system in the northern constellation of Vulpecula, abbreviated QQ Vul. It has a brightness that fluctuates around an apparent visual magnitude of 14.7, which is too faint to be viewed with the naked eye. The distance to this system is approximately 981 light years based on parallax measurements.

This system was detected as a soft X-ray source using the HEAO-1 satellite during 1977–78. The Einstein Observatory was then used in 1981 to more precisely position the source, which was designated E 2003+225. In 1982, J. A. Nousek and associates observed the optical counterpart and found it varied in brightness with a period of 3.706 hours, displaying strong emission lines of hydrogen and helium. They identified it as a variable of the AM Herculis type. The system shows a brightness variation of 0.7 magnitude during each orbit, plus a short-term flickering of 0.2 magnitudes.

The accepted model for this class of variable is a binary system with a red dwarf secondary in a close orbit with a magnetic white dwarf. The red dwarf is overflowing its Roche lobe and matter is streaming onto the white dwarf. The magnetic field of the white dwarf draws this material toward the magnetic poles, and the material is heated to a sufficient temperature to emit X-rays. In 1985, a weak, extended radio source was detected at the location of this system, suggesting it may be a remnant of a past nova event. X-ray observations in 1991 suggested there are separate regions of hard and soft X-ray emission, indicating matter is being accreted along two poles. The soft X-ray site is likely at the magnetic pole furthest from the secondary star.

The strength of the magnetic field in the white dwarf is estimated at ~30 MG. Over long periods, the system has been shown to switch between states of high and low brightness. K. Mukai and associates in 1986 suggested that the primary dip in the light curve is due to the geometry of the system in combination with a partial eclipse of the primary accretion region by the accretion column. The secondary dip may be caused by the limb of the white dwarf partially eclipsing the active accretion region. The rotation period of the white dwarf appears to be locked to the orbital period.
