= HD 192685 =

B-type star in the constellation Vulpecula

- Location of HD 192685 (circled)

Observation data Epoch J2000 Equinox ICRS
- Constellation: Vulpecula
- Right ascension: 20^{h} 15^{m} 15.89542^{s}
- Declination: +25° 35′ 31.0549″
- Apparent magnitude (V): 4.60 - 4.80

Characteristics
- Spectral type: B3Ve + A7V
- U−B color index: −0.73
- Variable type: γ Cas

Astrometry
Radial velocity (R_{v})	−7.00 km/s
Proper motion (μ)	RA: +6.93 mas/yr Dec.: −3.89 mas/yr
Parallax (π)	3.29±0.51 mas
Distance	approx. 1,000 ly (approx. 300 pc)
Absolute magnitude (M_{V})	−2.56

Details

A
Mass	4.7 M_{☉}
Luminosity	3331 L_{☉}
Surface gravity (log g)	3.49 cgs
Temperature	18,700 K
Metallicity [Fe/H]	−0.10 dex
Rotational velocity (v sin i)	160 km/s
Age	100 Myr

B
Mass	1.8 M_{☉}
Age	100 Myr

Other designations
- QR Vul, BD+25°4165, CCDM J20153+2536AB, GC 28140, HIP 99824, HR 7739, HD 192685, SAO 88410, WDS J20153+2536AB

Database references
SIMBAD	data

HD 192685, also known as QR Vulpeculae or HR 7739, is a binary star about 1,000 ly away in the constellation Vulpecula. It is visible to the naked eye.

== Description ==
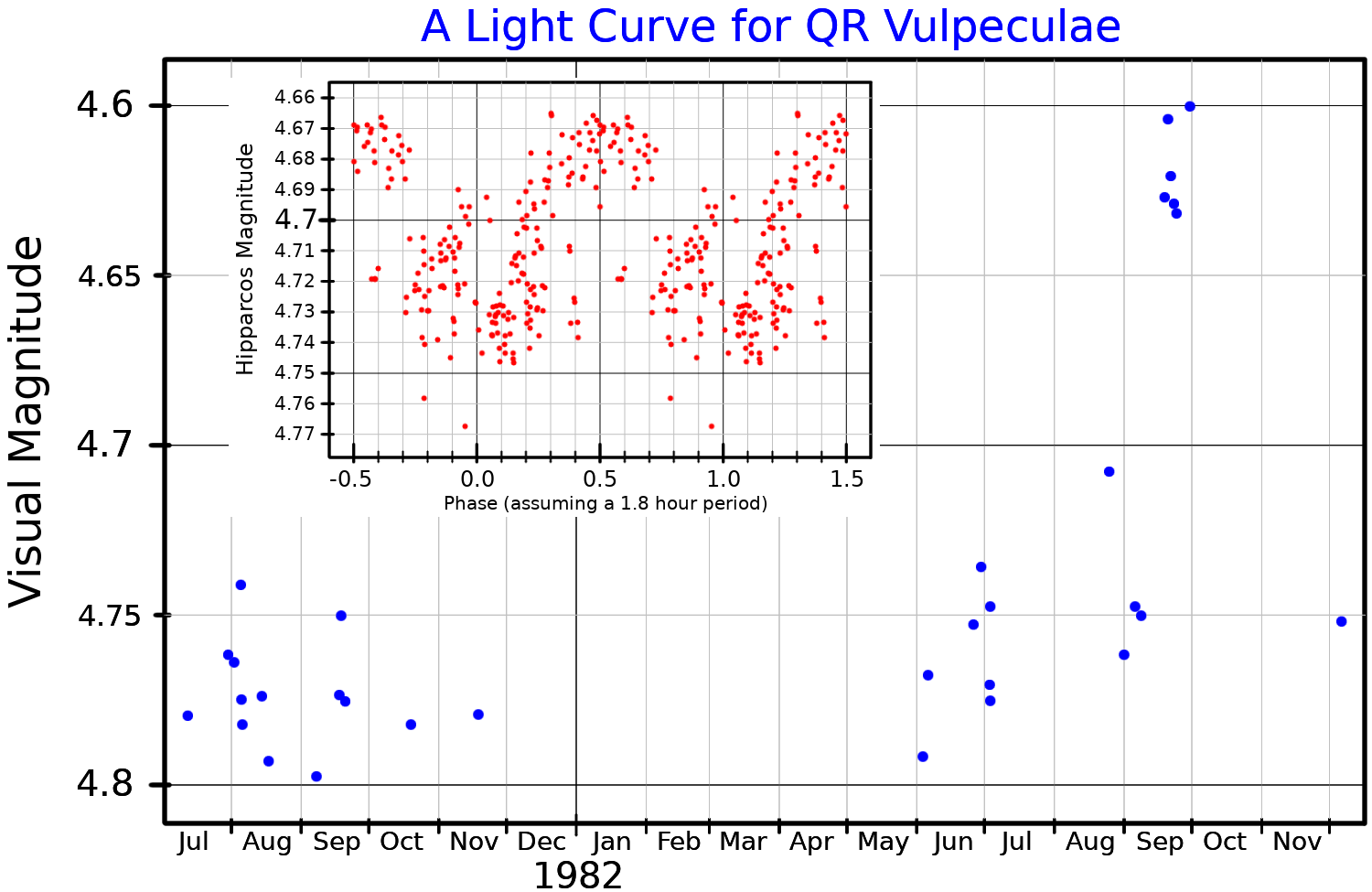
The main plot is a visual band light curve for QR Vulpeculae, adapted from Pavlovski et al. (1983), showing a sudden brightening. The inset plot, adapted from Lefèvre et al. (2009), shows the periodic variability.

In 1982 Krešimir Pavlovski and Hrvoje Božić announced their discovery that HD 192685 is a variable star. It was given its variable star designation, QR Vulpeculae, in 1985. HD 192685 varies slightly in brightness and is classified as a γ Cassiopeiae variable.

The stellar components have a projected separation of 70 astronomical units and have an estimated orbital period of 217 years. Component A is a Be star with a spectral type of B3Ve, having a mass 4.7 times that of the Sun, while component B has a class of A3V and is 1.8 times as massive as the Sun.

In July 1982, HD 192685 was observed to have its Hα spectral line, previously a broad absorption line, in emission with a central absorption core, and it was classified as a Be star. In late 1982 the emission increased in strength and the star brightened rapidly and briefly by over 0.1 magnitudes.

HD 192685 has excess infrared emissions (12-100 μm) which are interpreted to be free-free radiation in the gas surrounding the star.
