= Vulpecula in Chinese astronomy =

The Ancient Chinese recorded the modern constellation Vulpecula which lies across one of the quadrants symbolized by the Black Tortoise of the North (北方玄武, Běi Fāng Xuán Wǔ), and Three Enclosures (三垣, Sān Yuán), that divide the sky in traditional Chinese uranography.

The name of the western constellation in modern Chinese is 狐狸座 (hú li zuò), meaning "the fox constellation". While Vulpecula is derived from the Latin word “vulpes” meaning Fox.

== Stars ==
The map of Chinese constellation in constellation Vulpecula area consists of :

Four Symbols	Mansion (Chinese name)	Romanization	Translation	Asterisms (Chinese name)	Romanization	Translation	Western star name	Chinese star name	Romanization	Translation
Three Enclosures (三垣)	天市垣	Tiān Shì Yuán	Heavenly Market enclosure	天市左垣	Tiānshìzuǒyuán	Left Wall				
Three Enclosures (三垣)	天市垣	Tiān Shì Yuán	Heavenly Market enclosure	天市左垣	Tiānshìzuǒyuán	Left Wall	1 Vul	齊增三	Qízēngsān	3rd additional star of Qi
Three Enclosures (三垣)	天市垣	Tiān Shì Yuán	Heavenly Market enclosure	天市左垣	Tiānshìzuǒyuán	Left Wall	2 Vul	齊增四	Qízēngsì	4th additional star of Qi
Three Enclosures (三垣)	天市垣	Tiān Shì Yuán	Heavenly Market enclosure	天市左垣	Tiānshìzuǒyuán	Left Wall	α Vul	齊增五	Qízēngwǔ	5th additional star of Qi
Three Enclosures (三垣)	天市垣	Tiān Shì Yuán	Heavenly Market enclosure	天市左垣	Tiānshìzuǒyuán	Left Wall	HD 183400	齊增六	Qízēngliù	6th additional star of Qi
Three Enclosures (三垣)	天市垣	Tiān Shì Yuán	Heavenly Market enclosure	天市左垣	Tiānshìzuǒyuán	Left Wall	HD 182807	齊增七	Qízēngqī	7th additional star of Qi
Three Enclosures (三垣)	天市垣	Tiān Shì Yuán	Heavenly Market enclosure	天市左垣	Tiānshìzuǒyuán	Left Wall	3 Vul	齊增八	Qízēngbā	8th additional star of Qi
Three Enclosures (三垣)	天市垣	Tiān Shì Yuán	Heavenly Market enclosure	天市左垣	Tiānshìzuǒyuán	Left Wall	HD 178476	齊增九	Qízēngjiǔ	9th additional star of Qi
Three Enclosures (三垣)	天市垣	Tiān Shì Yuán	Heavenly Market enclosure	天市左垣	Tiānshìzuǒyuán	Left Wall	HD 179648	齊增十	Qízēngshí	10th additional star of Qi
Three Enclosures (三垣)	天市垣	Tiān Shì Yuán	Heavenly Market enclosure	天市左垣	Tiānshìzuǒyuán	Left Wall	8 Vul	齊增十一	Qízēngshíyī	11th additional star of Qi
Three Enclosures (三垣)	天市垣	Tiān Shì Yuán	Heavenly Market enclosure	天市左垣	Tiānshìzuǒyuán	Left Wall	HD 184151	齊增十二	Qízēngshíèr	12th additional star of Qi
Black Tortoise of the North (北方玄武)	牛	Niú	Ox	左旗	Zuǒqí	Left Flag				
Black Tortoise of the North (北方玄武)	牛	Niú	Ox	左旗	Zuǒqí	Left Flag	4 Vul	左旗增四	Zuǒqízēngsì	4th additional star
Black Tortoise of the North (北方玄武)	牛	Niú	Ox	左旗	Zuǒqí	Left Flag	5 Vul	左旗增五	Zuǒqízēngwǔ	5th additional star
Black Tortoise of the North (北方玄武)	牛	Niú	Ox	左旗	Zuǒqí	Left Flag	7 Vul	左旗增六	Zuǒqízēngliù	6th additional star
Black Tortoise of the North (北方玄武)	牛	Niú	Ox	左旗	Zuǒqí	Left Flag	9 Vul	左旗增七	Zuǒqízēngqī	7th additional star
Black Tortoise of the North (北方玄武)	牛	Niú	Ox	左旗	Zuǒqí	Left Flag	10 Vul	左旗增八	Zuǒqízēngbā	8th additional star
Black Tortoise of the North (北方玄武)	牛	Niú	Ox	左旗	Zuǒqí	Left Flag	CK Vul	左旗增九	Zuǒqízēngjiǔ	9th additional star
Black Tortoise of the North (北方玄武)	牛	Niú	Ox	左旗	Zuǒqí	Left Flag	15 Vul	左旗增十	Zuǒqízēngshí	10th additional star
Black Tortoise of the North (北方玄武)	牛	Niú	Ox	左旗	Zuǒqí	Left Flag	21 Vul	左旗增十一	Zuǒqízēngshíyī	11th additional star
Black Tortoise of the North (北方玄武)	牛	Niú	Ox	左旗	Zuǒqí	Left Flag	23 Vul	左旗增十二	Zuǒqízēngshíèr	12th additional star
Black Tortoise of the North (北方玄武)	牛	Niú	Ox	左旗	Zuǒqí	Left Flag	18 Vul	左旗增十三	Zuǒqízēngshísān	13th additional star
Black Tortoise of the North (北方玄武)	牛	Niú	Ox	左旗	Zuǒqí	Left Flag	19 Vul	左旗增十四	Zuǒqízēngshísì	14th additional star
Black Tortoise of the North (北方玄武)	牛	Niú	Ox	左旗	Zuǒqí	Left Flag	20 Vul	左旗增十五	Zuǒqízēngshíwǔ	15th additional star
Black Tortoise of the North (北方玄武)	牛	Niú	Ox	左旗	Zuǒqí	Left Flag	16 Vul	左旗增十六	Zuǒqízēngshíliù	16th additional star
Black Tortoise of the North (北方玄武)	牛	Niú	Ox	左旗	Zuǒqí	Left Flag	13 Vul	左旗增十七	Zuǒqízēngshíqī	17th additional star
Black Tortoise of the North (北方玄武)	牛	Niú	Ox	左旗	Zuǒqí	Left Flag	12 Vul	左旗增十八	Zuǒqízēngshíbā	18th additional star
Black Tortoise of the North (北方玄武)	牛	Niú	Ox	左旗	Zuǒqí	Left Flag	14 Vul	左旗增十九	Zuǒqízēngshíjiǔ	19th additional star
Black Tortoise of the North (北方玄武)	牛	Niú	Ox	左旗	Zuǒqí	Left Flag	17 Vul	左旗增二十	Zuǒqízēngèrshí	20th additional star
Black Tortoise of the North (北方玄武)	牛	Niú	Ox	左旗	Zuǒqí	Left Flag	24 Vul	左旗增二十一	Zuǒqízēngèrshíyī	21st additional star
Black Tortoise of the North (北方玄武)	牛	Niú	Ox	左旗	Zuǒqí	Left Flag	25 Vul	左旗增二十二	Zuǒqízēngèrshíèr	22nd additional star
Black Tortoise of the North (北方玄武)	牛	Niú	Ox	左旗	Zuǒqí	Left Flag	22 Vul	左旗增二十三	Zuǒqízēngèrshísān	23rd additional star
Black Tortoise of the North (北方玄武)	牛	Niú	Ox	左旗	Zuǒqí	Left Flag	HD 189944	左旗增三十	Zuǒqízēngsānshí	30th additional star
Black Tortoise of the North (北方玄武)	女	Nǚ	Girl	瓠瓜	Hùguā	Good Gourd	29 Vul	瓠瓜增五	Hùguāzēngwǔ	5th additional star
Black Tortoise of the North (北方玄武)	女	Nǚ	Girl	天津	Tiānjīn	Celestial Ford				
Black Tortoise of the North (北方玄武)	女	Nǚ	Girl	天津	Tiānjīn	Celestial Ford	27 Vul	天津增二十	Tiānjīnzēngèrshí	20th additional star
Black Tortoise of the North (北方玄武)	女	Nǚ	Girl	天津	Tiānjīn	Celestial Ford	26 Vul	天津增二十一	Tiānjīnzēngèrshíyī	21st additional star
Black Tortoise of the North (北方玄武)	女	Nǚ	Girl	天津	Tiānjīn	Celestial Ford	28 Vul	天津增二十二	Tiānjīnzēngèrshíèr	22nd additional star
Black Tortoise of the North (北方玄武)	女	Nǚ	Girl	天津	Tiānjīn	Celestial Ford	30 Vul	天津增二十三	Tiānjīnzēngèrshísān	23rd additional star
Black Tortoise of the North (北方玄武)	女	Nǚ	Girl	天津	Tiānjīn	Celestial Ford	31 Vul	天津增二十四	Tiānjīnzēngèrshísì	24th additional star
Black Tortoise of the North (北方玄武)	女	Nǚ	Girl	天津	Tiānjīn	Celestial Ford	32 Vul	天津增二十五	Tiānjīnzēngèrshíwǔ	25th additional star
Black Tortoise of the North (北方玄武)	危	Wēi	Rooftop	人	Rén	Humans	33 Vul	人增一	Hùguāzēngyī	1st additional star

== See also ==
- Traditional Chinese star names
- Chinese constellations
