= NGC 6800 =

Open cluster

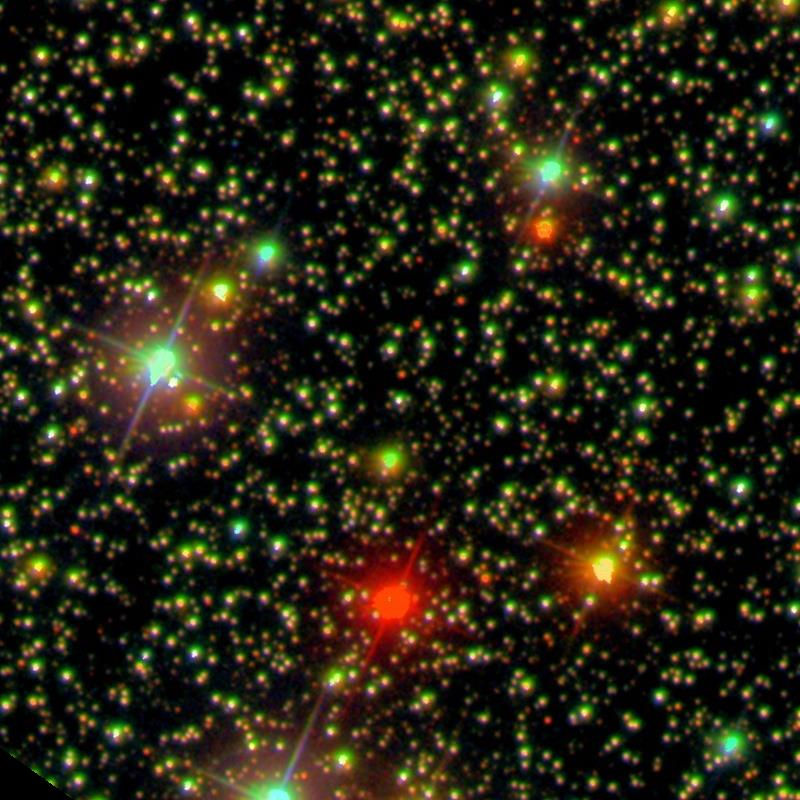

Observation data
- Right ascension: 19^{h} 28^{m} 12^{s}
- Declination: +25° 11′ 39″
- Distance: 3300 (1012)
- Apparent magnitude (V): 10.05
- Apparent dimensions (V): 5' x 6'

Physical characteristics
- Estimated age: 250Myr
- Other designations: h 2041, GC 4497, OCL 123

Associations
- Constellation: Vulpecula

NGC 6800 is an open cluster in Vulpecula. It is located 30' to the east of Alpha Vulpeculae. It was discovered on 10 September 1784, by William Herschel and independently rediscovered by his son John Herschel on 18 August 1828.

The cluster contains 109 members. The brightest are 10th magnitude stars, with the remainder being dimmer main-sequence stars.
