= 3C 223.1 =

Radio galaxy in the constellation Lynx

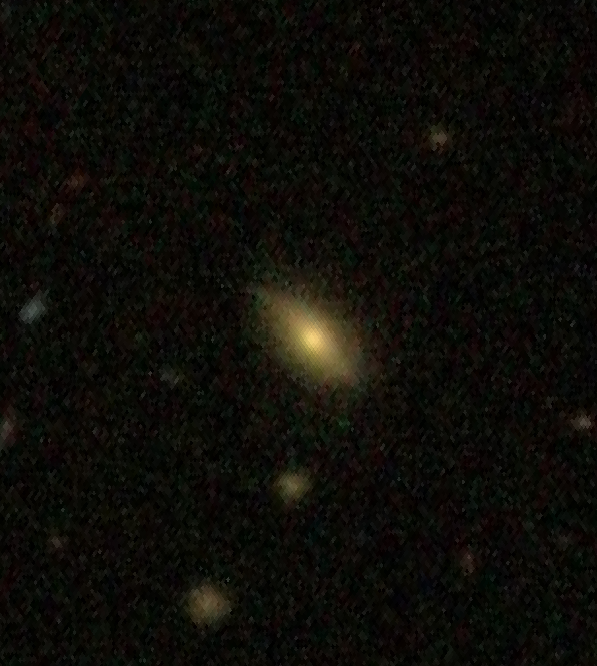
- SDSS image of 3C 223.1

Observation data (J2000.0 epoch)
- Constellation: Lynx
- Right ascension: 09^{h} 41^{m} 24.02^{s}
- Declination: +39° 44′ 41.86″
- Redshift: 0.107500
- Heliocentric radial velocity: 32,228 ± 4 km/s
- Distance: 1,561.5 ± 109.3 Mly (478.76 ± 33.51 Mpc)
- Absolute magnitude (V): 16.56

Characteristics
- Type: Radio galaxy Sy2

Other designations
- 2MASX J09412403+3944418, 4C +39.28, B2 0938+39, CoNFIG 052, PGC 27674, [CHL2009] X08, NRAO 329, NYU-VAGC 0924287, TXS 0938+399, SDSS J094124.01+394441.8

3C 223.1 is a radio galaxy located in the constellation of Lynx. The redshift of the galaxy is (z) 0.107 and it was first discovered from the Third Cambridge Catalogue of Radio Sources in 1962. Subsequently, it was identified with a galaxy counterpart by J.D. Wyndham in May 1966.

== Description ==
3C 223.1 is an elliptical galaxy located inside a poor galaxy group without any evidence of X-ray emission. It has a central galactic bulge with a dust disk structure, based on Hubble Space Telescope imaging. Dust arm features are present near the galaxy's central nucleus.

It is categorized as a classic X-shaped radio galaxy. When observed with the Giant Metrewave Radio Telescope, the source of the galaxy is mainly complex with a pair of radio lobes in both directions and wing features that have measured spectral indices of -0.37 ± 0.14 and -0.62 ± 0.14. The lobes have high surface brightness and are shown to penetrate through the center of the host galaxy symmetrically. There is evidence that the magnetic field is linked together with the northwest wing and the northeast lobe.

A weak radio jet is detected between the position of its radio core and the northern lobe. At high resolution, the jet becomes unresolved. The hotspot feature of the northern lobe is significantly polarized, with further evidence of an area of low fractional polarization located in the northern part of the northern hotspot. There is a ring-like feature located in the southern lobe. The total radio power is estimated to be 25.54 W Hz^{−1} sr^{−1} and the radio emission has an angular size of 140 arcseconds.

A study in 2022 revealed 3C 223.1 has a double boomerang morphology. Both the boomerang features approach each other by 4.3 kiloparsecs from the host galaxy and the primary lobes of the galaxy are also offset laterally despite being parallel to one another.

== See also ==
- X-shaped radio galaxy
- Radio galaxy
- Astrophysical jet
- Elliptical galaxy
- Galaxy group
- 3C 315
- 3C 433
