= NGC 6820 and NGC 6823 =

Emission nebula and star cluster in the constellation Vulpecula

Emission nebula
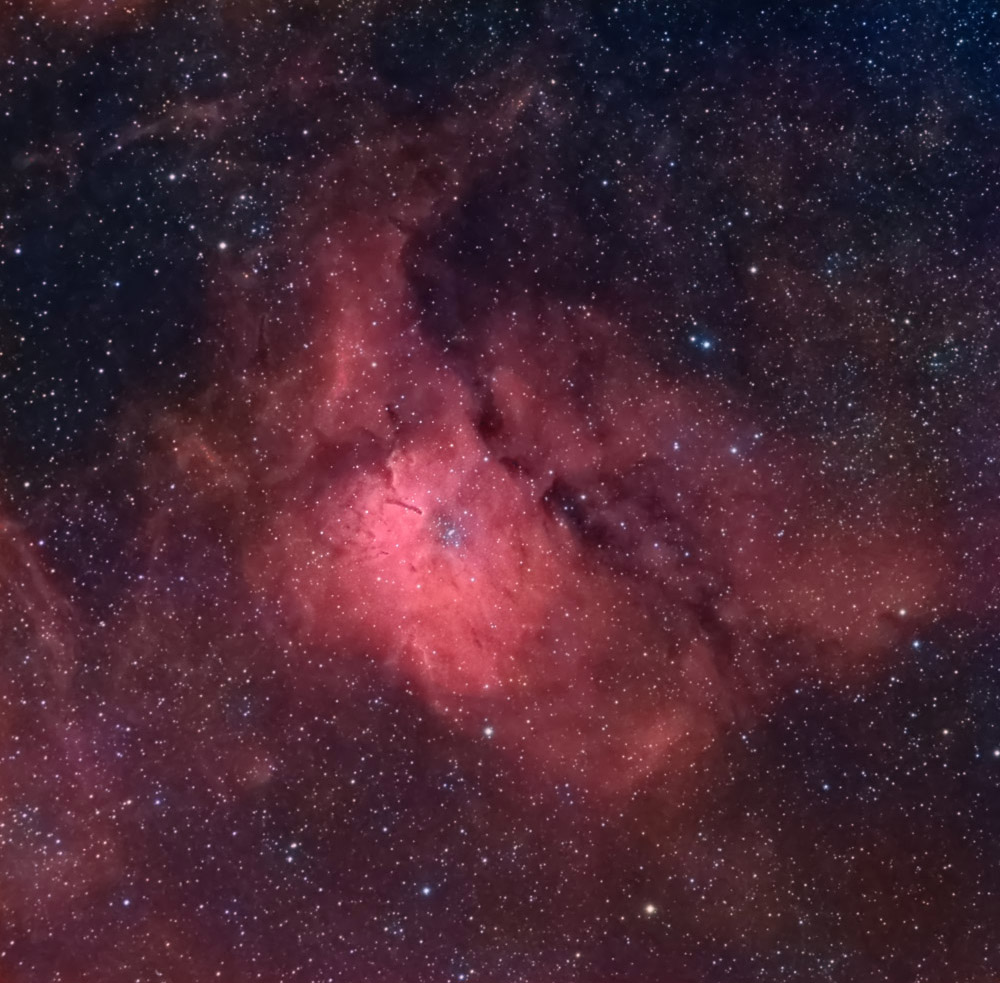
- NGC 6820/NGC 6823

Observation data: J2000.0 epoch
- Right ascension: 19^{h} 42^{m} 27.92^{s}
- Declination: +23° 05′ 14.7″
- Distance: 6,000 ly
- Apparent magnitude (V): 7.1
- Apparent dimensions (V): 40 arcmins
- Constellation: Vulpecula
- Designations: NGC 6820, Sh 2-86, GC 5945, Marth #401; NGC 6823, GC 4512, JH 2049, WH VII

NGC 6820 is an emission nebula that surrounds the much smaller open cluster NGC 6823 in Vulpecula.

Messier 27 is found three degrees to the east, and α Vulpeculae three degrees to the west.

== NGC 6820 ==
The emission nebula NGC 6820 was discovered by Albert Marth on August 7, 1864. The nebula is being pushed out and away by the radiation from the stars of NGC 6823, creating huge 'pillars' of gas and dust, similar to the pillars of creation.

== NGC 6823 ==
NGC 6823 was discovered by William Herschel on July 17, 1785. It is about 50 light-years across and lies about 6,000 light-years away. The center of the cluster formed about two million years ago and is dominated in brightness by a host of bright young blue stars. Outer parts of the cluster contain even younger stars. It forms the core of the Vulpecula OB1 stellar association.

== Image gallery ==
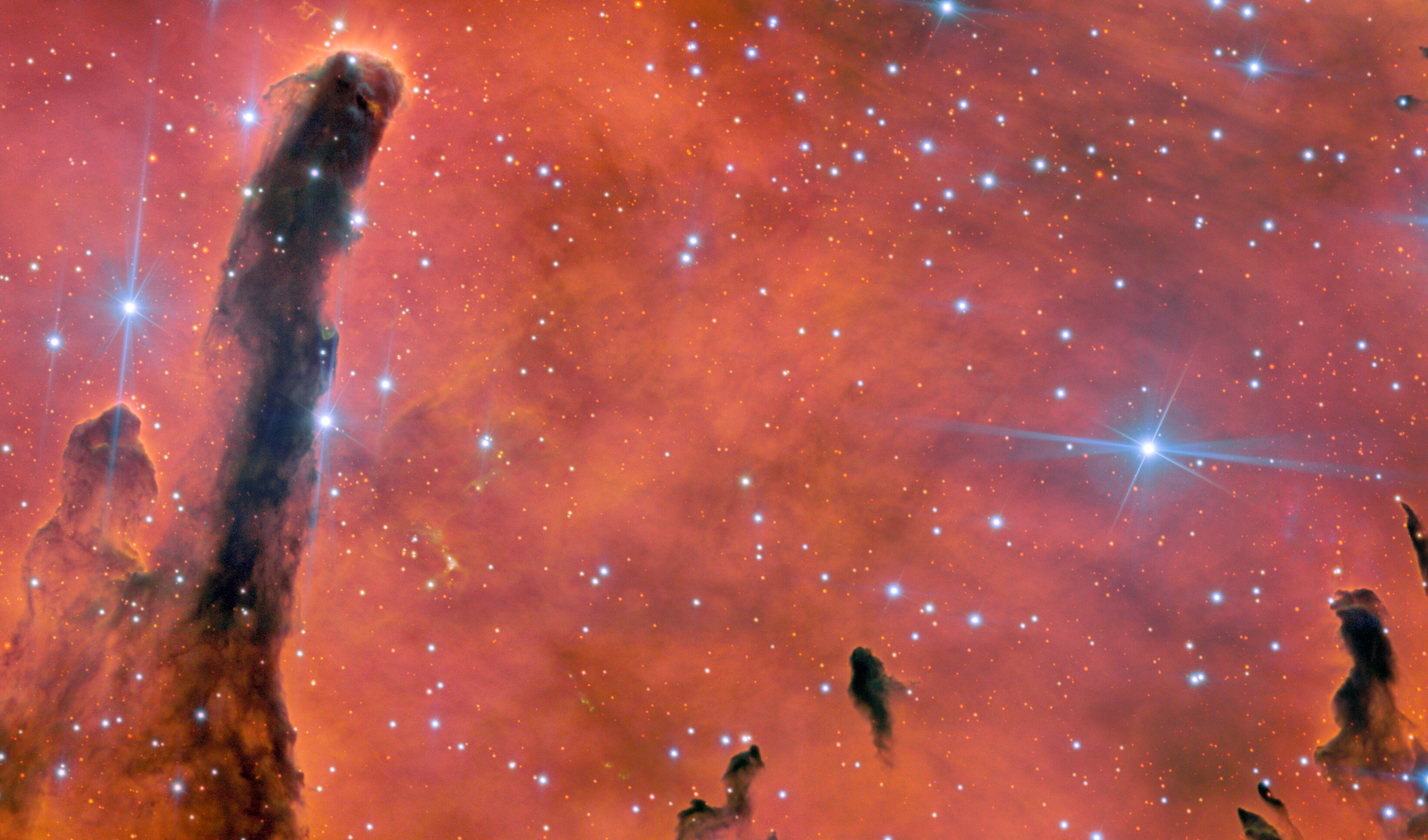
NGC 6820 imaged by the Gemini North Telescope

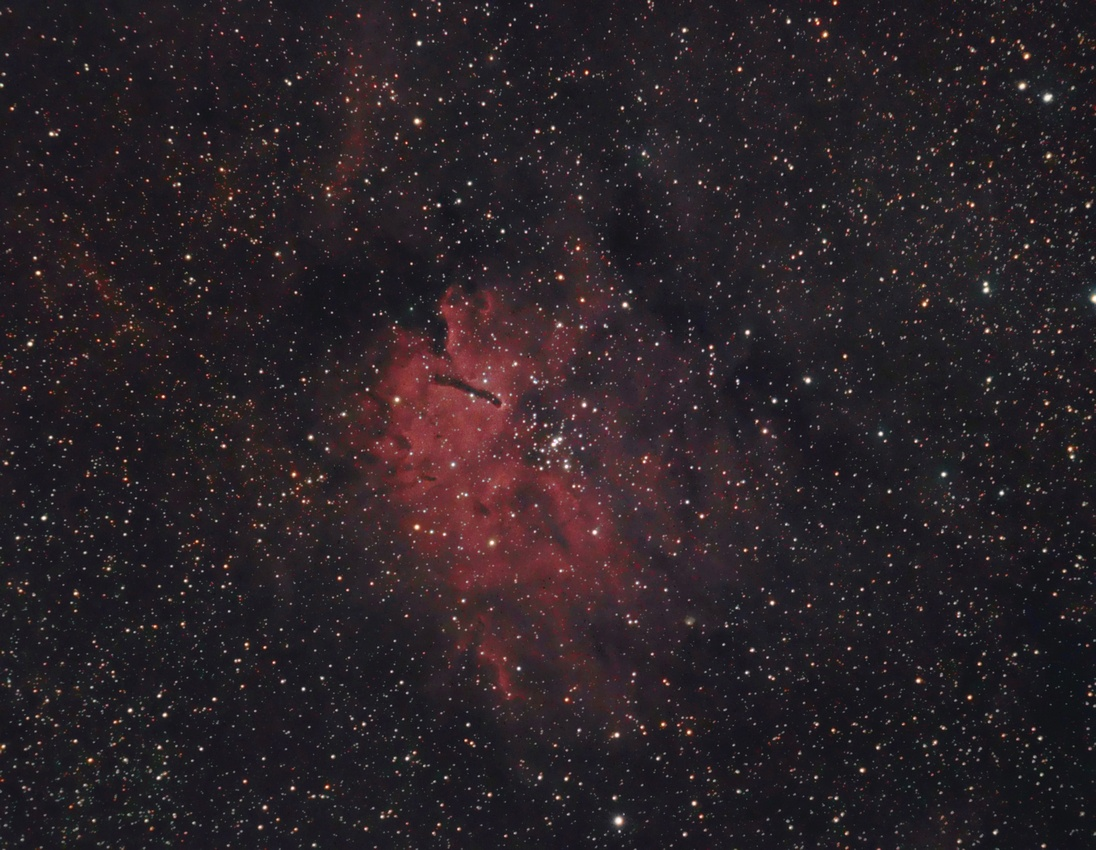
NGC 6820/NGC 6823 – Courtesy: Hunter Wilson

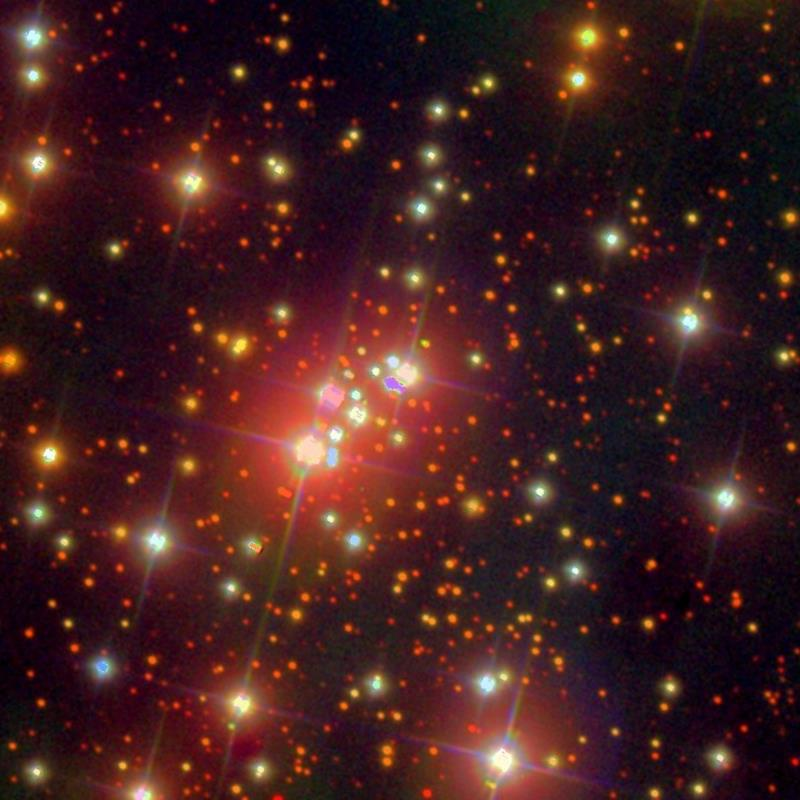
NGC 6823
