= C37 =

C37 or C-37 may refer to:

== Vehicles ==
Aircraft

- Caudron C.37, a French passenger biplane
- Cessna C-37, an American civil utility aircraft
- Gulfstream Aerospace C-37A, an American military VIP passenger jet based on the Gulfstream V
- Gulfstream Aerospace C-37B, an American military VIP passenger jet based on the Gulfstream G550
- Lockheed C-37 Electra, an American military transport

Automobiles

- Dongfeng Sokon C37, a Chinese van
- Marshall C37, a British bus
- Sauber C37, a Swiss Formula One car

Ships

- Corsair 37, an American trimaran sailboat
- HMS C37, a C-class submarine of the Royal Navy
- Catalina 37, a yacht produced by Catalina Yachts

== Other uses ==
- C37 road (Namibia)
- Caldwell 37, an open cluster
- King's Gambit, a chess opening
- Route C37 (Massachusetts), a street in Boston
- SARS-CoV-2 Lambda variant, also known as lineage C.37
