= R Vulpeculae =

The Bayer designation r Vulpeculae and the variable star designation R Vulpeculae are distinct. Due to technical limitations, both designations link here. For the star

- R Vulpeculae, a Mira variable
- r Vulpeculae, a designation by John Flamsteed.
