= Brocchi =

Brocchi is a surname, and may refer to:

- Cristian Brocchi (born 1976), Italian football manager and former player
- Giovanni Battista Brocchi (1772–1826), Italian naturalist, mineralogist and geologist
- Paul Brocchi (1838–1898), French naturalist and agronomist

== See also ==
- Brocchi's Cluster
