= NGC 6885 =

Open cluster in the constellation Vulpecula

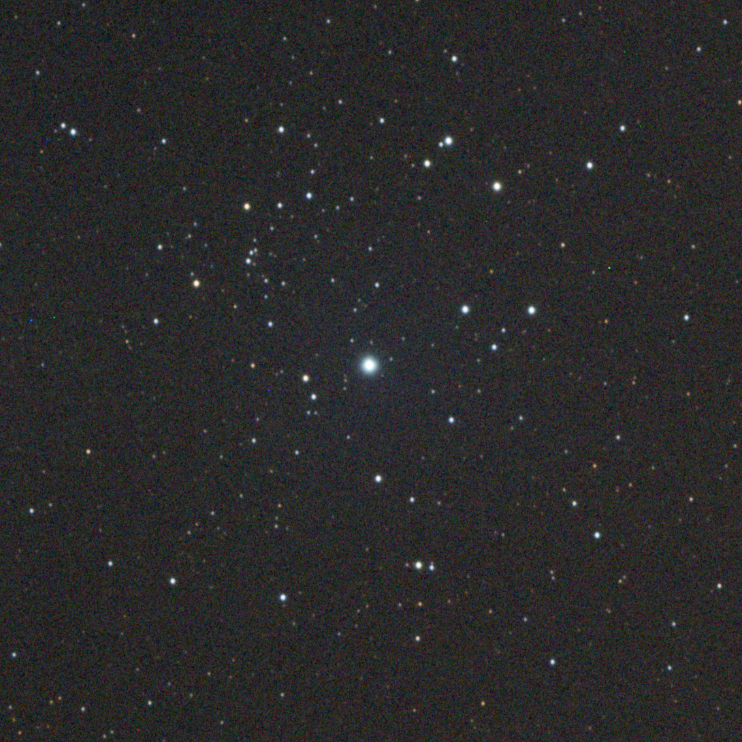
- NGC 6885 seen in 2025, 20 Vul at center.

Observation data (J2000 epoch)
- Right ascension: 20^{h} 12^{m} 00^{s}
- Declination: +26° 29′ 00″
- Distance: 1950 ly (600 pc)
- Apparent magnitude (V): +5.7/+8.1
- Apparent dimensions (V): 7′/18′

Physical characteristics
- Other designations: Caldwell 37

Associations
- Constellation: Vulpecula

NGC 6885, also Caldwell 37, is an open cluster in the constellation Vulpecula. It shines at magnitude +5.7/+8.1. Its celestial coordinates are RA 20^{h} 12.0^{m} , dec +26° 29′. It surrounds the naked eye Be star 20 Vulpeculae, and is located near M27 (Dumbbell nebula), the nebula IC 4954, and open clusters NGC 6882 and NGC 6940. It is 7'/18' across. It was discovered in 1784 by William Herschel.
