= Vulpecula OB1 =

Association of Stars in Vulpecula

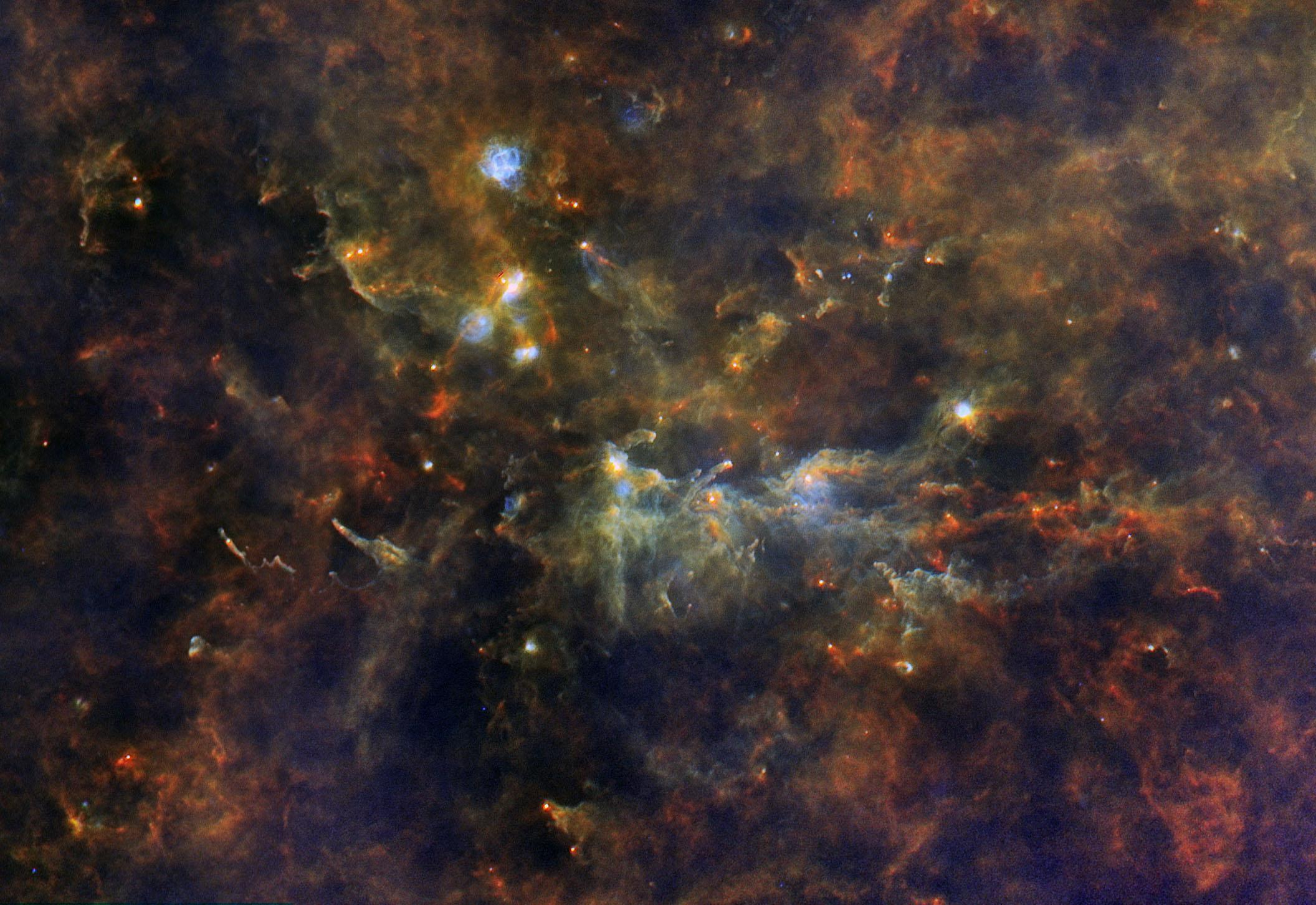
- Vulpecula OB1

Observation data (J2000 epoch)
- Constellation: Vulpecula
- Right ascension: 19^{h} 44.0^{m}
- Declination: +24° 13′
- Mean distance: 5.2 kly (1.6 kpc)
- Radial velocity: 3.1 km/s

Physical characteristics
- Other designations: Vul OB1

Vulpecula OB1 is an OB association in which a batch of massive stars are being born. It was first identified by W. W. Morgan et al. (1953). The association is located in the Orion Arm about 7,500 light-years away from the Sun. Nebulae that are contained in this association include NGC 6820 and NGC 6823, plus Sharpless 2-88.

Vul OB1 contains nearly 100 OB-stars and over 800 young stellar objects. The association is about 100 parsec long and formed homogeneously. The YSOs exist as two populations, one population that represent isolated YSOs and another population that follows the infrared nebulosity. The YSO population is high around Sharpless 2-86, Sh 2-87, Sh 2-88, the compact HII-regions and other star clusters like Cr404. This is suspected to be caused by triggered star-formation. The OB-stars sculpt many of the pillar-like structures in this region.
