= 5 Vulpeculae =

Star in the constellation Vulpecula

- 5 Vul in the constellation Vulpecula (circled)

Observation data Epoch J2000 Equinox ICRS
- Constellation: Vulpecula
- Right ascension: 19^{h} 26^{m} 13.2463^{s}
- Declination: +20° 05′ 51.8394″
- Apparent magnitude (V): 5.65±0.010

Characteristics
- Evolutionary stage: main sequence
- Spectral type: A0 V
- Apparent magnitude (U): 5.62±0.012
- Apparent magnitude (B): 5.66±0.011

Astrometry
Radial velocity (R_{v})	−20.9±2.9 km/s
Proper motion (μ)	RA: +3.395±0.114 mas/yr Dec.: −34.787±0.137 mas/yr
Parallax (π)	13.8921±0.0900 mas
Distance	235 ± 2 ly (72.0 ± 0.5 pc)
Absolute magnitude (M_{V})	1.29

Details
Mass	2.33±0.02 M_{☉}
Radius	2.7 R_{☉}
Luminosity	34±2 L_{☉}
Surface gravity (log g)	4.0 cgs
Temperature	9,840+91 −90 K
Rotational velocity (v sin i)	154 km/s
Age	198 Myr

Other designations
- 5 Vul, BD+19°4015, HD 182919, HIP 95560, HR 7390, SAO 104831

Database references
SIMBAD	data

5 Vulpeculae is a single, white-hued star in the northern constellation of Vulpecula. It is situated amidst a random concentration of bright stars designated Collinder 399, or Brocchi's Cluster. This is a faint star that is just visible to the naked eye with an apparent visual magnitude of 5.60. Based upon an annual parallax shift of 13.8921±0.0900 mas, it is located around 235 light years from the Sun. It is moving closer with a heliocentric radial velocity of −21 km/s, and will make its closest approach in 2.5 million years at a separation of around 120 ly (36.89 pc).

This is a young A-type main-sequence star with a stellar classification of A0 V. It is a rapidly rotating star with a projected rotational velocity of 154 km/s. The star has an estimated 2.33 times the mass of the Sun and about 2.7 times the Sun's radius. It is radiating 34 times the Sun's luminosity from its photosphere at an effective temperature of 8,940 K.

A warm debris disk was detected by the Spitzer Space Telescope at a temperature of 206 K (−89 °F; −67 °C), orbiting 13 Astronomical units from the host star. Although this finding has not been directly detected, the emission signature indicates the disk is in the form of a thin ring. The emission displays weak transient absorption features that are indicative of kilometer-sized exocomets that are undergoing evaporation as they approach the host star. These absorption features have been observed to vary on time scales of hours, days, or months.
