= 4 Vulpeculae =

Star in the constellation Vulpecula

Observation data Epoch J2000 Equinox ICRS
- Constellation: Vulpecula
- Right ascension: 19^{h} 25^{m} 28.6030^{s}
- Declination: +19° 47′ 54.060″
- Apparent magnitude (V): 5.16

Characteristics
- Evolutionary stage: red clump
- Spectral type: K0 III
- B−V color index: +0.980

Astrometry
| Radial velocity (R_{v}) | +0.95±0.12 km/s |
| Proper motion (μ) | RA: +87.392±0.137 mas/yr Dec.: −73.038±0.152 mas/yr |
| Parallax (π) | 12.5320±0.1008 mas |
| Distance | 260 ± 2 ly (79.8 ± 0.6 pc) |
| Absolute magnitude (M_{V}) | +0.54 |

Details
| Mass | 1.72 M_{☉} |
| Radius | 11.42 R_{☉} |
| Luminosity | 67.6 L_{☉} |
| Surface gravity (log g) | 3.01 cgs |
| Temperature | 4,763±26 K |
| Metallicity [Fe/H] | −0.20 dex |
| Rotational velocity (v sin i) | 2.9 km/s |
| Age | 2.63 Gyr |

Other designations
- 4 Vul, BD+19°4010, HD 182762, HIP 95498, HR 7385, SAO 104818, WDS J19255+1948A, Gaia DR2 4515855716012824704

Database references
| SIMBAD | data |

4 Vulpeculae is a single, orange-hued star in the northern constellation of Vulpecula. It forms part of the asterism, formerly thought to be an open cluster, called the coathanger or Brocchi's Cluster. The star is faintly visible to the naked eye with an apparent visual magnitude of 5.16. The distance to this star, based upon an annual parallax shift of 12.5320±0.1008 mas, is around 260 light years.

At the age of about 2.6 billion years old, this is an aging giant star with a stellar classification of K0 III, having exhausted the supply of hydrogen at its core and evolved off the main sequence. It is now a red clump giant, indicating that it is on the horizontal branch and is generating energy through the fusion of helium at its core. The star has an estimated 1.72 times the mass of the Sun and has expanded to 11.42 times the Sun's radius. It is radiating 67.6 times the Sun's luminosity from its enlarged photosphere at an effective temperature of 4,763 K.
