= 7 Vulpeculae =

Star in the constellation Vulpecula

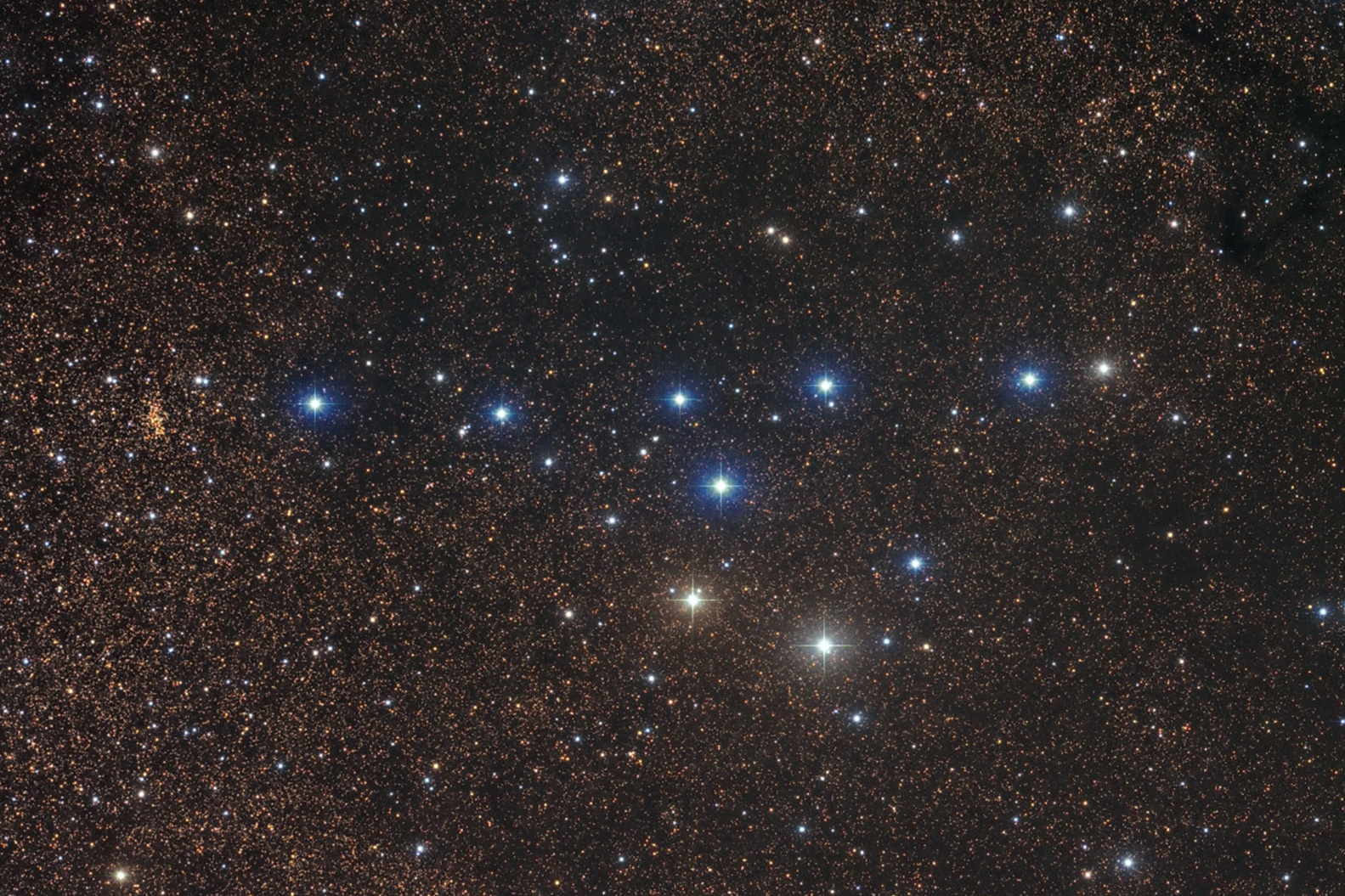
- 7 Vulpeculae is at the eastern (left) end of an asterism called the coathanger, or "Brocchi's Cluster".

Observation data Epoch J2000.0 Equinox J2000.0
- Constellation: Vulpecula
- Right ascension: 19^{h} 29^{m} 20.8974^{s}
- Declination: 20° 16′ 47.0583″
- Apparent magnitude (V): 6.337

Characteristics
- Spectral type: B4–5 III–IVe + sdB/sdO
- U−B color index: −0.585
- B−V color index: −0.157

Astrometry
Radial velocity (R_{v})	−16.5±0.2 km/s
Proper motion (μ)	RA: 2.555±0.069 mas/yr Dec.: −15.383±0.071 mas/yr
Parallax (π)	3.5826±0.04 mas
Distance	910 ± 10 ly (279 ± 3 pc)
Absolute magnitude (M_{V})	−1.66+0.44 −0.51

Orbit
Period (P)	69.30±0.07 d
Semi-major axis (a)	0.5553±0.0096 AU
Eccentricity (e)	0
Inclination (i)	98.7±1.2°
Longitude of the node (Ω)	151.0±0.6°
Periastron epoch (T)	2,454,248.1±2.7 HJD
Argument of periastron (ω) (secondary)	90°
Semi-amplitude (K_{1}) (primary)	8.7±0.2 km/s
Semi-amplitude (K_{2}) (secondary)	77.2±1.5 km/s

Details

7 Vul A
Mass	4.25±0.23 M_{☉}
Radius	5.2 R_{☉}
Surface gravity (log g)	3.75±0.02 cgs
Temperature	15,600±200 K
Rotational velocity (v sin i)	300±30 km/s
Age	50–80 Myr

7 Vul B
Mass	0.477±0.020 M_{☉}

Other designations
- 7 Vul, BD+19 4039, HD 183537, HIP 95818, HR 7409, SAO 87269

Database references
SIMBAD	data

7 Vulpeculae is a binary star system approximately 910 light years away in the slightly northern constellation of Vulpecula. It is a challenge to view with the naked eye, having an apparent visual magnitude of 6.3. The system has a heliocentric radial velocity of −16.5 km/s.

This is a single-lined spectroscopic binary star system with an orbital period of 69.3 days and an eccentricity of 0.16. The visible component is a Be star with a stellar classification of B4–5 III–IVe that appears to be nearing the end of its main sequence lifetime. The system shows a rapid projected rotational velocity of 300 km/s, which is just below the estimated critical velocity for a binary of 367 km/s.

There is a small variability in the magnitude over a 0.559-day cycle; this is likely the rotation period of the primary star.

The companion is a hot subdwarf, either a subdwarf B or subdwarf O star, with a mass of 48% the Sun's mass. It has a close orbital separation of half an astronomical unit and take 69 days to complete an orbit.
