= 8 Vulpeculae =

Star in the constellation Vulpecula

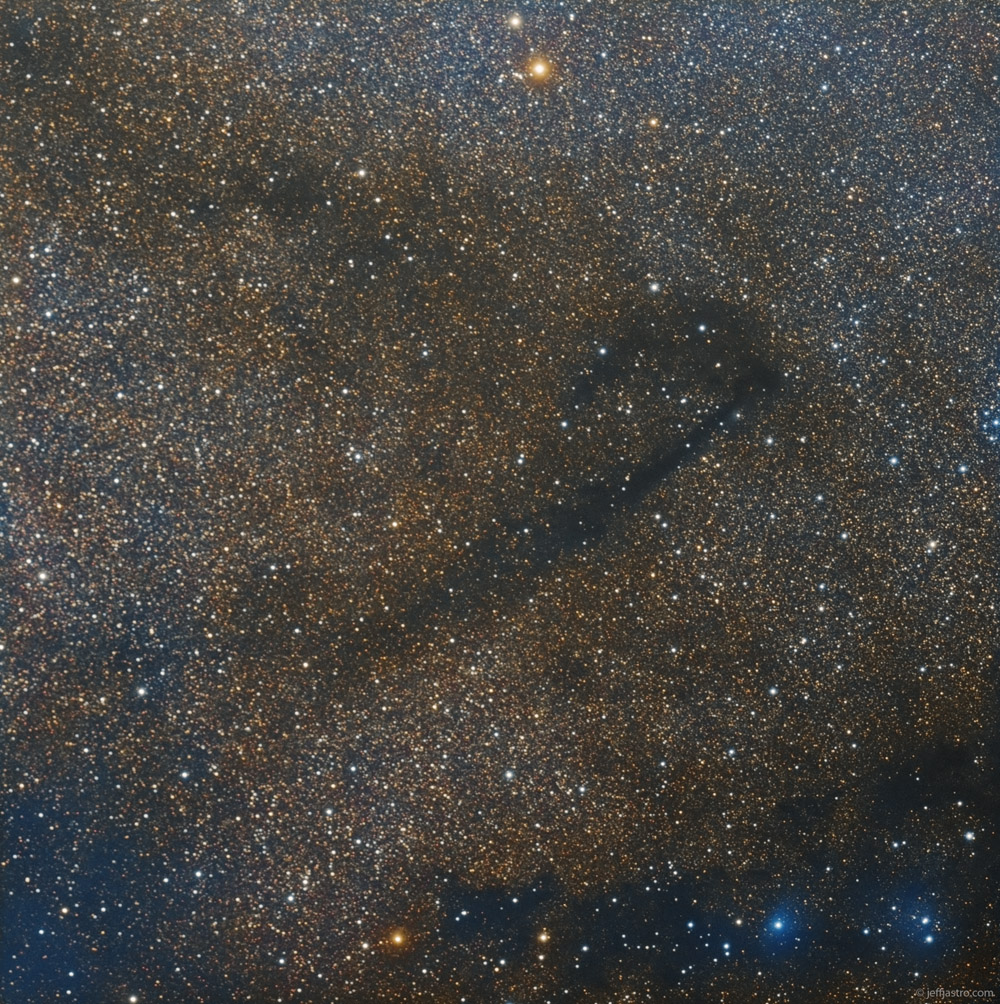
- α and 8 Vulpeculae form a pair at top center

Observation data Epoch J2000.0 Equinox ICRS
- Constellation: Vulpecula
- Right ascension: 19^{h} 28^{m} 57.08327^{s}
- Declination: 24° 46′ 07.2656″
- Apparent magnitude (V): 5.82

Characteristics
- Spectral type: K0 III
- B−V color index: 1.023±0.005

Astrometry
Radial velocity (R_{v})	−28.58±0.20 km/s
Proper motion (μ)	RA: 8.750 mas/yr Dec.: 16.334 mas/yr
Parallax (π)	7.1397±0.0739 mas
Distance	457 ± 5 ly (140 ± 1 pc)
Absolute magnitude (M_{V})	−0.16

Details
Mass	3.07 M_{☉}
Radius	13.8+0.2 −0.4 R_{☉}
Luminosity	100.5±1.3 L_{☉}
Surface gravity (log g)	2.63 cgs
Temperature	4,915+71 −30 K
Metallicity [Fe/H]	+0.11 dex
Age	324 Myr

Other designations
- 8 Vul, BD+24 3761, HD 183491, HIP 95785, HR 7406, SAO 87267

Database references
SIMBAD	data

8 Vulpeculae is star located about 457 light years away in the northern constellation of Vulpecula. It lies just 7′ from Alpha Vulpeculae and the two form an optical double. 8 Vulpeculae is visible to the naked eye as a faint, yellow-orange hued star with an apparent visual magnitude of 5.82. It is moving closer to the Earth with a heliocentric radial velocity of −29 km/s.

This is an aging giant star with a stellar classification of K0 III, which indicates it has exhausted the hydrogen supply at its core and evolved away from the main sequence. It is 324 million years old with three times the mass of the Sun and has expanded to 14 times the Sun's radius. The star is radiating 100 times the Sun's luminosity from its enlarged photosphere at an effective temperature of 4,915 K.
