= Sh 2-88 =

Nebula in the constellation Vulpecula

Diffuse nebula
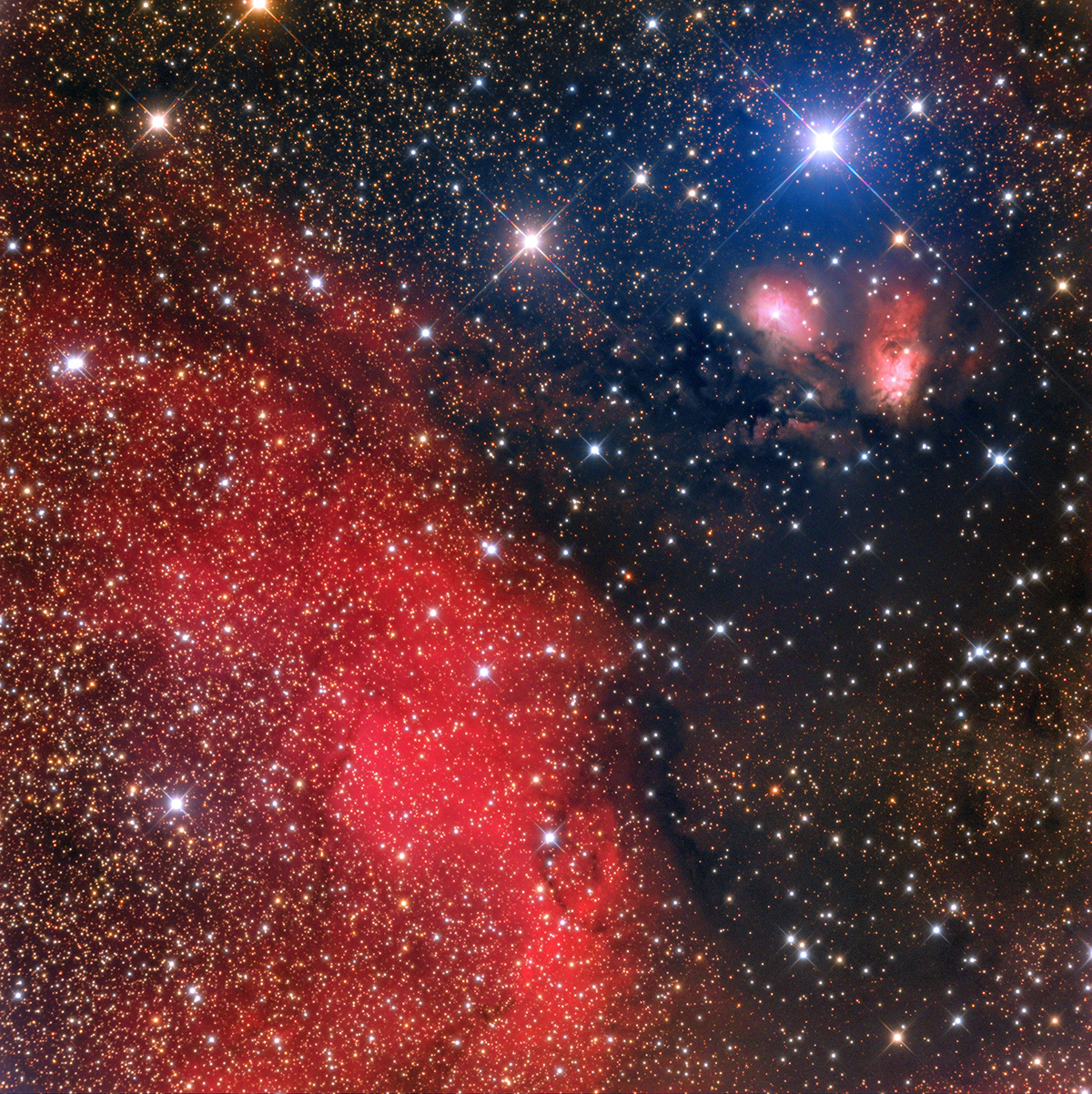
- Sh2-88 Nebula from the Mount Lemmon SkyCenter Schulman Telescope

Observation data: Epoch J2000 epoch
- Subtype: Reflection/Emission
- Right ascension: 19h 45m 59s
- Declination: 25° 20' 00"
- Distance: 6,523 ly (2400 pc)
- Apparent dimensions (V): 47 light years across
- Constellation: Vulpecula

Physical characteristics
- Radius: 345 ly
- Absolute magnitude (V): --
- Designations: LBN 139, The Face of God Nebula

Sharpless 2-88 or Sh 2-88 is a region including the diffuse nebula Sh 2-88A and the two compact knots Sh 2-88B1 and Sh 2-88B2, all of which are associated with Vulpecula OB1.

Sh 2-88A is an HII-type diffuse nebula excited by the type O8 star BD+25°3952. Both neutral and ionized gases in Sh 2-88 are between 150 and 410 solar masses and the dust mass is about 2 to 9 solar masses. The structure has been interacting with a HI interstellar bubble shaped by the stellar winds of BD+25°3952 and the blue O8.5II(f) star BD +25°3866. Overall, its actual structure is located 2.4 kiloparsecs away, at 23 × 15 parsecs in radius. It has a dynamical age of 1.5 million years, and a mass of 1,300 solar masses. It has an rms electron density of 9 cm^{−3}. All separate star forming regions are 1 arcminute in diameter.

== Nearby objects ==
Sharpless 2-88 is the first part of this nebula to have created a star-forming region. It had star formation first start in this large diffuse nebula, which then spread to the other star-forming regions in the nebula. It spread to the compact Sharpless 2-88B1, then to the ultracompact Sharpless 2-88B2.

Sharpless 2-88B1 is a HII region ionized by an O8.5-9.5 V star, and is compact. It is also associated with a nearby star cluster that contains several massive stars.

Sharpless 2-88B2 is a HII region ionized by a star that is dimmer than B0.5 V, and is ultracompact.
