= NGC 7052 =

Galaxy in the constellation Vulpecula

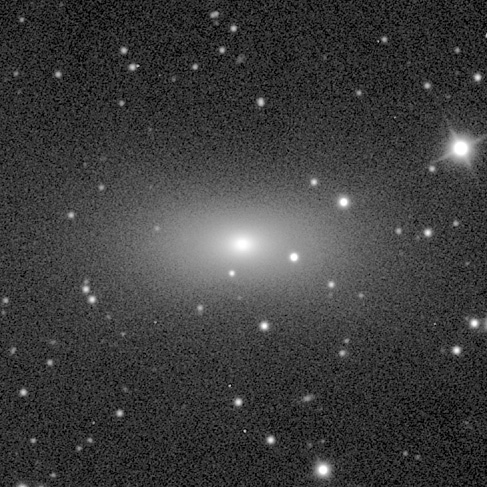
- An image of NGC 7052

Observation data (J2000 epoch)
- Constellation: Vulpecula
- Right ascension: 21^{h} 18^{m} 33^{s}
- Declination: +26° 26′ 49″
- Redshift: 4672 ± 8 km/s
- Apparent magnitude (V): 13.4

Characteristics
- Type: E
- Apparent size (V): 2.5′ × 1.4′

Other designations
- UGC 11718, PGC 66537

NGC 7052 is an elliptical galaxy in the constellation Vulpecula. The galaxy harbours a supermassive black hole with mass c. 220–630 million solar masses in its nucleus.

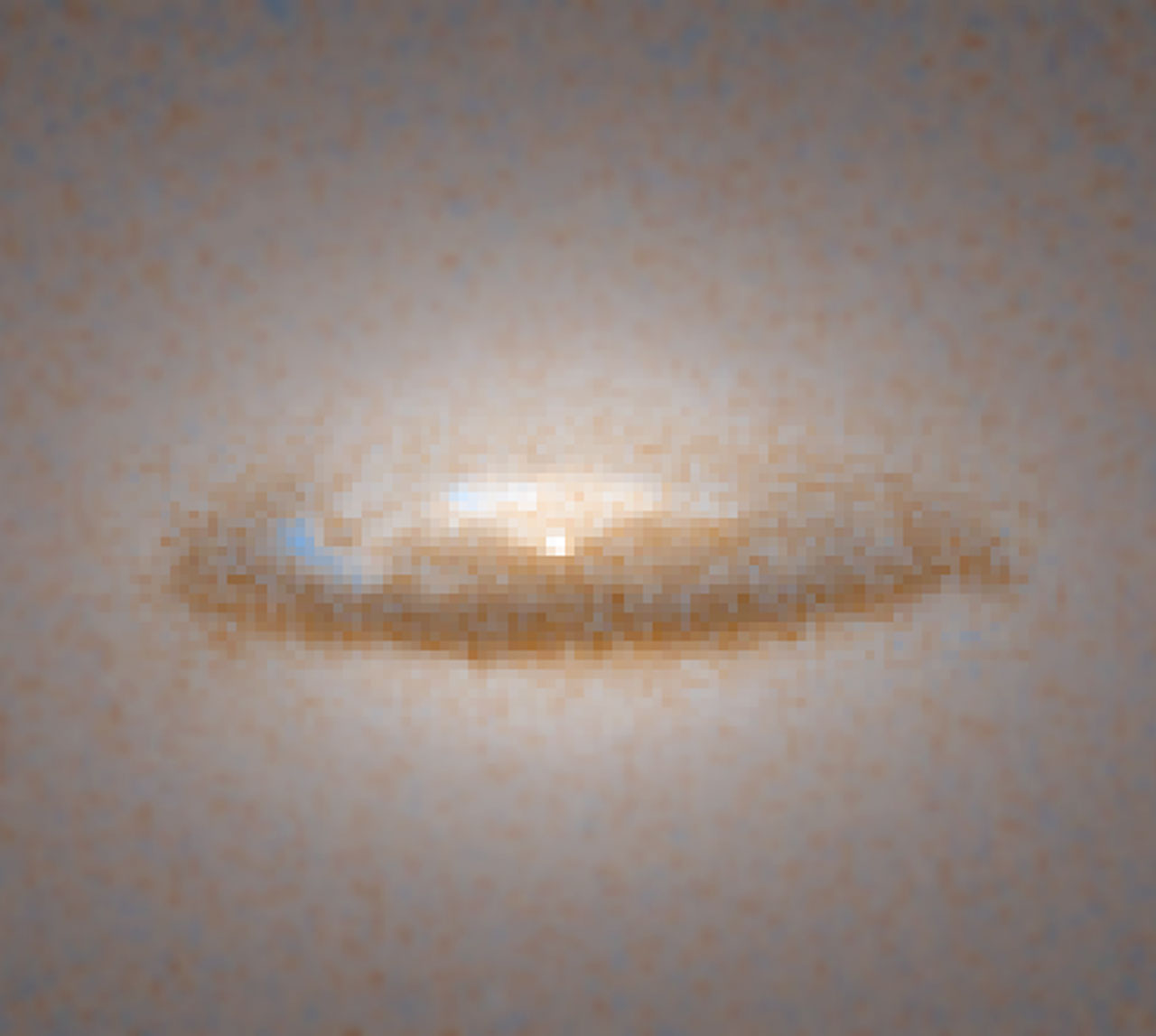
A Hubble Space Telescope (HST) image of the center of NGC 7052. Credit: HST/NASA/ESA
