= Kappa Gruis =

Star in the constellation Grus

- Location of κ Gruis (circled in red)

Observation data Epoch J2000.0 Equinox J2000.0 (ICRS)
- Constellation: Grus
- Right ascension: 23^{h} 04^{m} 39.62786^{s}
- Declination: −53° 57′ 53.6651″
- Apparent magnitude (V): 5.37

Characteristics
- Evolutionary stage: asymptotic giant branch
- Spectral type: K5 III
- B−V color index: +1.45

Astrometry
Radial velocity (R_{v})	+17.7±0.8 km/s
Proper motion (μ)	RA: +57.047 mas/yr Dec.: −104.882 mas/yr
Parallax (π)	8.8748±0.1536 mas
Distance	368 ± 6 ly (113 ± 2 pc)
Absolute magnitude (M_{V})	−1.04

Details
Radius	29.59+0.60 −2.02 R_{☉}
Luminosity	199.9±4.0 L_{☉}
Temperature	3,990+143 −40 K

Other designations
- κ Gru, CPD−54°10197, FK5 3845, HD 217902, HIP 113957, HR 8774, SAO 247711

Database references
SIMBAD	data

κ Gruis, Latinised as Kappa Gruis, is a solitary star in the southern constellation of Grus. With an apparent magnitude of 5.37, it is visible to the naked eye as a dim, orange-hued point. The distance to this system, as determined from an annual parallax shift of 8.87 mas as seen from the Earth, is roughly 368 light years. It is drifting further away with a heliocentric radial velocity of +18 km/s. It is a member of the Arcturus moving group.

This is an evolved K-type giant star on the asymptotic giant branch with a stellar classification of K5 III. With the supply of hydrogen at its core exhausted, it has expanded and now spans 29.6 times the radius of the Sun. It is radiating 200 times the Sun's luminosity from its enlarged photosphere at an effective temperature of 3,990 K.
