= 27 Cancri =

Star in the constellation Cancer

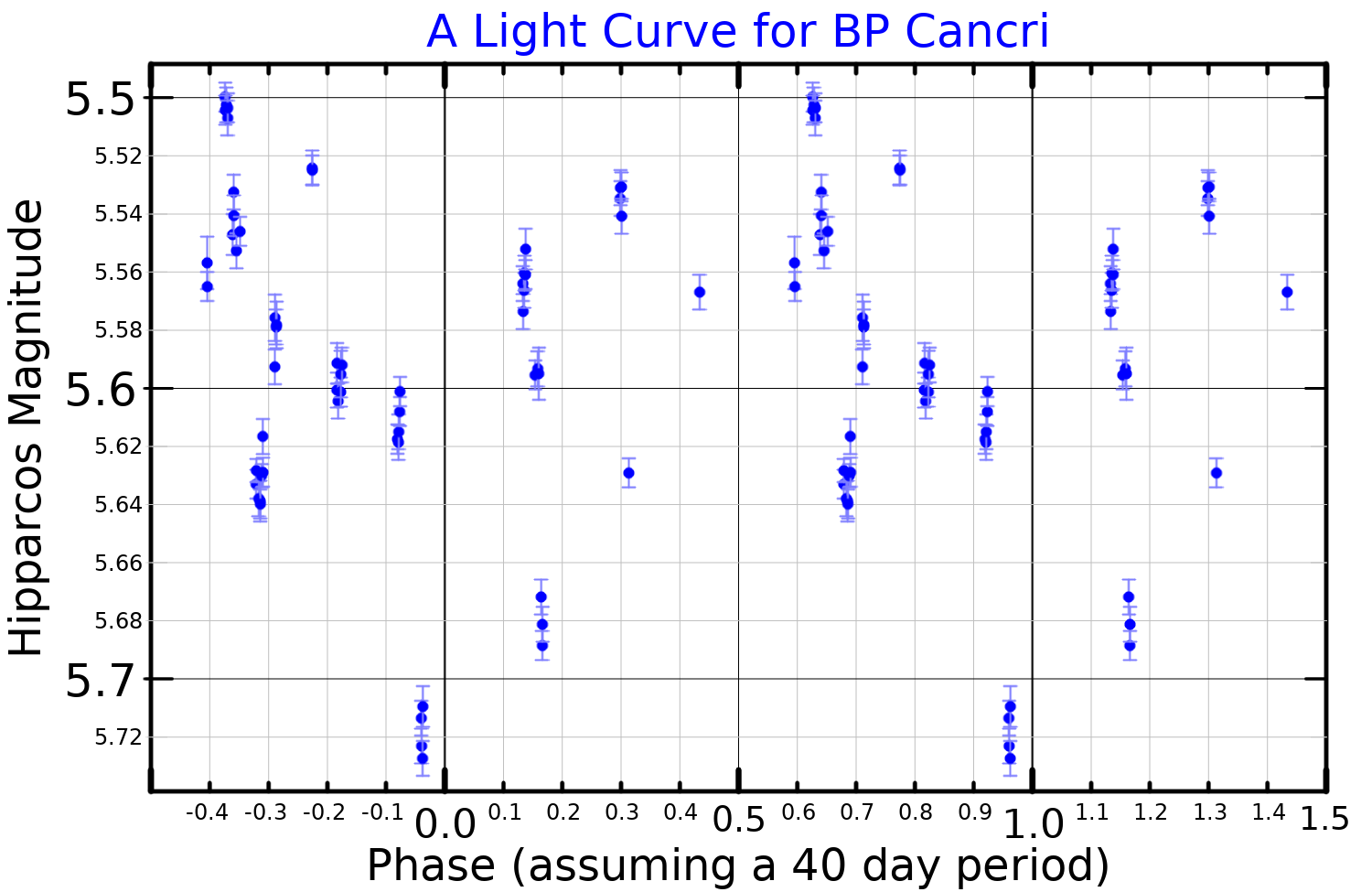
- A light curve for 27 Cancri, plotted from Hipparcos data

Observation data Epoch J2000.0 Equinox J2000.0
- Constellation: Cancer
- Right ascension: 08^{h} 26^{m} 43.94035^{s}
- Declination: +12° 39′ 16.6066″
- Apparent magnitude (V): +5.41 to 5.75

Characteristics
- Evolutionary stage: Asymptotic giant branch
- Spectral type: M3 IIIa
- B−V color index: 1.608±0.002
- Variable type: SRb

Astrometry
Radial velocity (R_{v})	−8.30±0.31 km/s
Proper motion (μ)	RA: −19.760 mas/yr Dec.: −104.664 mas/yr
Parallax (π)	3.3094±0.3176 mas
Distance	990 ± 90 ly (300 ± 30 pc)
Absolute magnitude (M_{V})	−1.62

Details
Radius	119 R_{☉}
Luminosity	2,455+707 −550 L_{☉}
Surface gravity (log g)	1.00 cgs
Temperature	3,574 K
Metallicity [Fe/H]	0.00 dex

Other designations
- 27 Cnc, BP Cancri, AAVSO 0821+13, BD+13°1912, FK5 2658, GC 11525, HD 71250, HIP 41400, HR 3319, SAO 97819

Database references
SIMBAD	data

27 Cancri is a single star in the zodiac constellation of Cancer, located around 990 light-years away from the Sun. It is visible to the naked eye as a faint, red-hued star with a typical apparent visual magnitude of around +5.5. The star is moving closer to the Earth with a heliocentric radial velocity of −8.3 km/s. It is a member of the Arcturus stream, a group of stars with high proper motion and metal-poor properties thought to be the remnants of a small galaxy consumed by the Milky Way.

The variability of the brightness of 27 Cancri was announced by Joel Stebbins and Charles Morse Huffer in 1928, based on observations made at Washburn Observatory. It was given its variable star designation, BP Cancri, in 1977.

This is an aging red giant with a stellar classification of M3 IIIa, currently on the asymptotic giant branch. It is classified as a semiregular variable star of type SRb and its brightness varies from magnitude +5.41 to +5.75 with a period of 40 days. The star is radiating around 2,455 times the Sun's luminosity from its enlarged photosphere at an effective temperature of 3,574 K.
