= 20 Vulpeculae =

Star in the constellation Vulpecula

Observation data Epoch J2000.0 Equinox J2000.0
- Constellation: Vulpecula
- Right ascension: 20^{h} 12^{m} 00.70176^{s}
- Declination: +26° 28′ 43.6989″
- Apparent magnitude (V): 5.91

Characteristics
- Evolutionary stage: main sequence
- Spectral type: B7 Ve
- B−V color index: −0.107±0.003

Astrometry
Radial velocity (R_{v})	−22.0±4.3 km/s
Proper motion (μ)	RA: +4.096 mas/yr Dec.: −9.524 mas/yr
Parallax (π)	2.7904±0.0726 mas
Distance	1,170 ± 30 ly (358 ± 9 pc)
Absolute magnitude (M_{V})	−2.13

Details
Mass	4.02±0.14 M_{☉}
Radius	3.0 R_{☉}
Luminosity	460+88 −74 L_{☉}
Surface gravity (log g)	2.90 cgs
Temperature	12,050+168 −165 K
Rotational velocity (v sin i)	236 km/s

Other designations
- 20 Vul, BD+26°3828, HD 192044, HIP 99531, HR 7719, SAO 88339

Database references
SIMBAD	data

20 Vulpeculae is single star located around 1,170 light years away in the northern constellation of Vulpecula. It is visible to the naked eye as a dim, blue-white hued star with an apparent visual magnitude of 5.91. The object is moving closer to the Earth with a heliocentric radial velocity of −22 km/s.

This is a Be star with a stellar classification of B7 Ve. It is spinning rapidly with a projected rotational velocity of 236 km/s (compared to a critical velocity of 332 km/s) and has an estimated polar inclination of 71.1°. The star has four times the mass of the Sun and is radiating around 460 times the Sun's luminosity from its photosphere at an effective temperature of 12,050 K.
