= 23 Vulpeculae =

Star in the constellation Vulpecula

- Location of 23 Vulpeculae (circled)

Observation data Epoch J2000 Equinox ICRS
- Constellation: Vulpecula
- Right ascension: 20^{h} 15^{m} 46.1432^{s}
- Declination: 27° 48′ 51.116″
- Apparent magnitude (V): 4.52

Characteristics
- Spectral type: K3- III Fe-1
- U−B color index: +1.11
- B−V color index: +1.26

Astrometry
Radial velocity (R_{v})	+1.47 km/s
Proper motion (μ)	RA: −39.938±0.128 mas/yr Dec.: 12.121±0.147 mas/yr
Parallax (π)	9.9642±0.1698 mas
Distance	327 ± 6 ly (100 ± 2 pc)
Absolute magnitude (M_{V})	−0.58

Orbit
Primary	23 Vul Aa
Name	23 Vul Ab
Period (P)	25.33 yr
Semi-major axis (a)	0.111″
Eccentricity (e)	0.400
Inclination (i)	71.5°
Longitude of the node (Ω)	97.5°
Periastron epoch (T)	2009.56
Argument of periastron (ω) (secondary)	293.8°

Details

23 Vul A
Mass	2.4 M_{☉}
Radius	31±2 R_{☉}
Luminosity	288 L_{☉}
Surface gravity (log g)	0.89 cgs
Temperature	4,413±125 K
Metallicity [Fe/H]	−0.22 dex
Rotational velocity (v sin i)	3.7 km/s

Other designations
- 23 Vul, BD+27°3666, GC 28152, HD 192806, HIP 99874, HR 7744, SAO 88428, WDS J20158+2749AB

Database references
SIMBAD	data

23 Vulpeculae is a triple star system in the northern constellation of Vulpecula. It is visible to the naked eye as a faint, orange-hued star with an apparent visual magnitude of 4.52 and it is located approximately 327 light years away from the Sun based on parallax. The system is moving further from the Earth with a heliocentric radial velocity of +1.47 km/s.

Component A forms a binary system with an orbital period of 25.33 years, an eccentricity of 0.40, and a semimajor axis of 0.11″. The 4.80 magnitude member of this pair, component Aa is an aging giant star with a stellar classification of K3- III Fe-1, where the suffix indicates an underabundance of iron in the spectrum. This star has 2.4 times the mass of the Sun and is radiating 288 times the Sun's luminosity from its enlarged photosphere at an effective temperature of 4,413 K. Its companion, component Ab, has magnitude 6.5. The tertiary member, component B, has a separation of 0.26" and a magnitude of 6.94.
