= Brocchi's Cluster =

Asterism of 10 stars in the constellation Vulpecula

- Image of Brocchi's Cluster
- Object type: Asterism
- Other designations: OCl 113, OCl 113.0, C 1923+200

Observation data (Epoch J2000.0)
- Constellation: Vulpecula
- Right ascension: 19^{h} 25^{m} 24^{s}
- Declination: 20° 11′ 00″
- In visual light (V)
- Apparent magnitude: 3.6
- Size: ~60'
- Related media on Wikimedia Commons

Brocchi's Cluster (also known as Collinder 399, Cr 399 or Al-Sufi's Cluster) is an asterism of ten stars. Six of the stars appear in a row, across 1.3° of the night sky. The cluster is in the south of the constellation Vulpecula, near the border with Sagitta. Its nickname is the Coathanger. None of these ten stars are believed to be gravitationally bound to each other, thus they are not a star cluster, a fact established by measurements taken by the Hipparcos satellite in 1997. An additional 30 or so much fainter stars are considered by some to be part of the asterism.

== History ==
It was first described by the Persian astronomer Al Sufi in his Book of Fixed Stars in 964.

In the 17th century, it was independently rediscovered by the Italian astronomer G. B. Hodierna.

In the 1920s, Dalmero Francis Brocchi, an amateur astronomer and chart maker for the American Association of Variable Star Observers (AAVSO), created a map of the stars for use in calibrating photometers.

In 1931, Swedish astronomer Per Collinder listed it in his catalogue of open clusters.

== Status ==
The status of this group as a star cluster has changed in recent years. The group was considered to be a cluster for most of the 20th century. Looking at better, albeit imprecise metrics, a study in 1970 said that six of the brightest stars formed a cluster; the fainter four did not. Several independent studies since 1998 have determined that the stars are not a true cluster at all, but rather relatively near Milky Way stars with a close angular alignment. These recent studies are based on improved measurements of parallax and proper motion of the stars, taken by the Hipparcos satellite. Hipparcos detected up minute changes in parallax against other stars. This data was first published in 1997 and has been enhanced by subsequent orbits and cross-referencing with other readings.

== The "Coathanger" ==
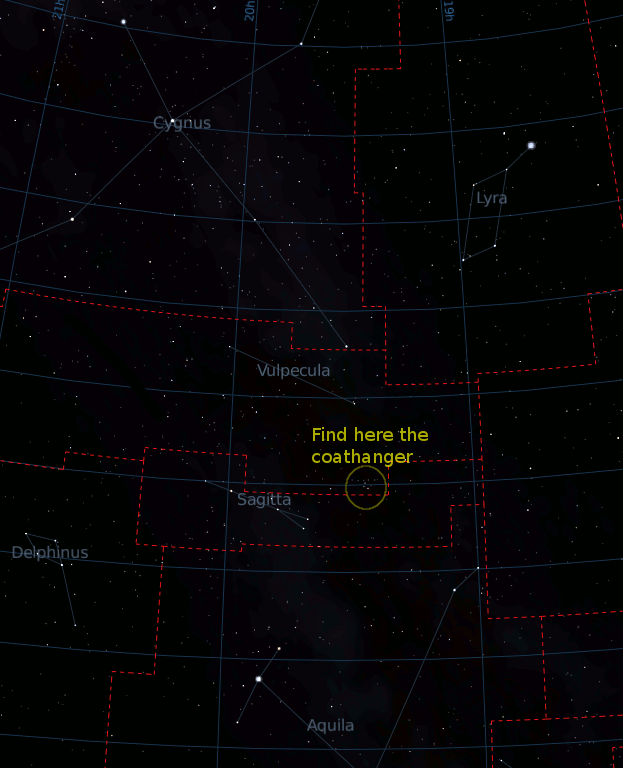
How to find the Coathanger asterism: about 8 degrees NW of the W end of the arrow-shaped Sagitta constellation.

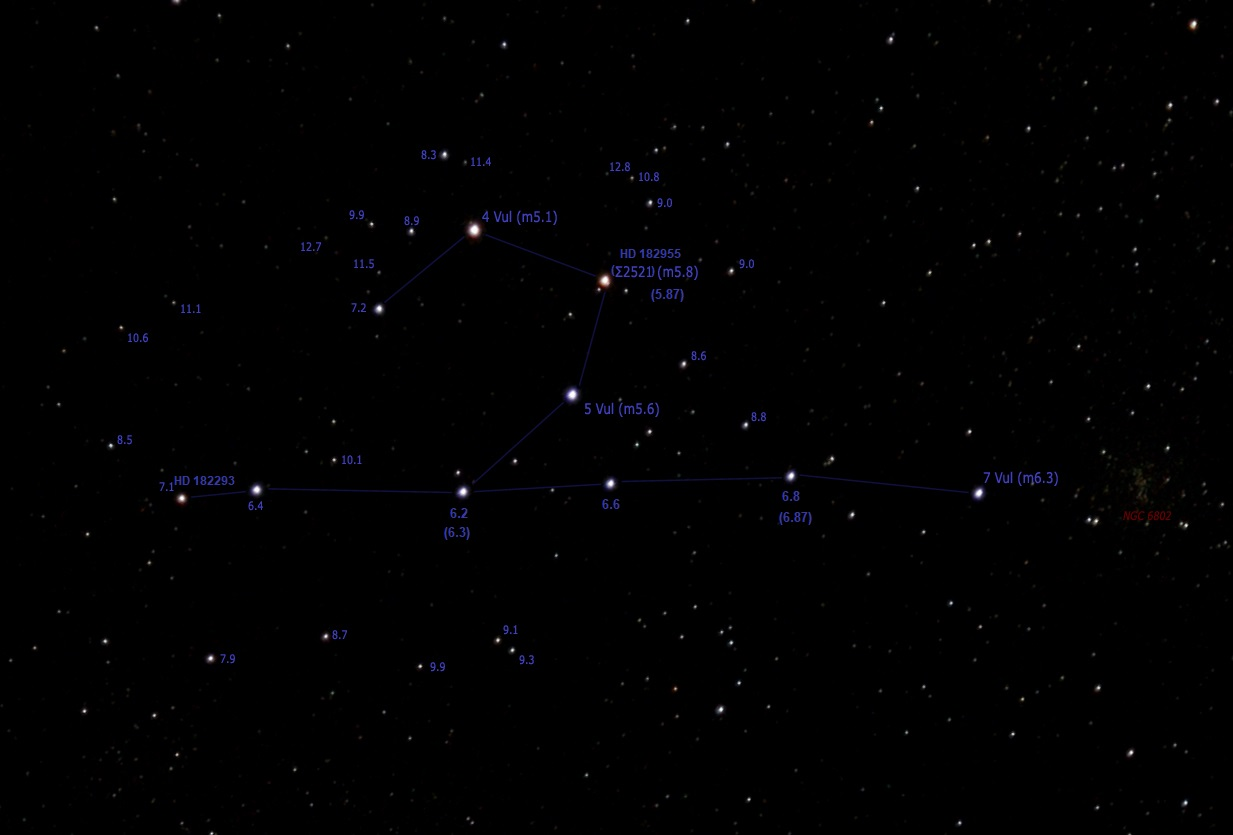
The Coathanger (Cr 399); eight of its ten stars are labelled with at least their observed (apparent) magnitudes, as is the open cluster on the same alignment of the row of six (and centred with a similar angular separation to that of these stars) just east. The westernmost star has a smaller separation than the others.

The asterism is made up of ten stars ranging from 5th to 7th magnitude which form the conspicuous "coathanger", a straight line of six stars with a "hook" of 4 stars on the south side. An additional 30 or so much fainter stars to terrestrial observers are sometimes considered to be associated.

Under a dark sky, the coathanger can be seen with the naked eye as an unresolved patch of light; binoculars, zoom cameras, or a telescope at very low power are usually needed to view this asterism. It can be found by slowly sweeping across the Milky Way along an imaginary line from the bright star Altair toward the even brighter star Vega. About one third of the way, the coathanger should be spotted easily against a darker region of the Milky Way. The asterism is best seen in July–August and north of +20° latitude. As compared to the closest horizon it will be upside-down (as in the picture top right of this page) when at its highest point. South of this latitude it is upright as the 'hanger' is south of the line of six stars.

The asterism and its immediate surroundings are a useful gauge for determining the faintest stars visible in a small telescope as there are a wide range of stellar magnitudes within the cluster easily viewed in one small patch of the sky.

There follows a table of the ten stars commonly seen as members of the coathanger, organized by right ascension. They diverge in distance; HD 182955 and HD 182620 are, quite considerably, mutually the closest but certainly not gravitationally bound. The former has a proper motion on the second axis of −47.5 mas per year; the latter one of +9.8 mas/yr. At their distance from the Sun, the proper motion difference projects to a transverse velocity difference of 54 km/s, faster than most stars in the solar neighborhood move relative to the Sun. This pair sit "across the hook" (i.e. widthways), with HD 182620 being the tip of the hook.

The faintest of the three bright stars, with resultant Flamsteed numbers, in this asterism is slightly dimmer than one without such a designation, and is joined by the six other stars in having a relatively similar Henry Draper catalog number, due to their position in the night sky and having sufficient apparent brightness (visible wavelength magnitude) to make the catalog.

Name	Apparent magnitude (V)	Spectral type	Distance (LY)
HD 182293	7.11	K3IVp	353±0.85
HD 182422	6.39	B9.5V	1124±14.6
HD 182620	7.16	A2V	584±2
HD 182761	6.29	A0V	413±2
HD 182762 (4 Vul)	5.16	K0III	255.8±1.3
HD 182919 (5 Vul)	5.60	A0V	235.3±0.8
HD 182955	5.87	M0III	577±5.4
HD 182972	6.63	A1V	793±9
HD 183261	6.88	B3II	1735±116
HD 183537 (7 Vul)	6.33	B5Vn	910±10

== NGC 6802 ==
The "rail" of the coathanger leads, east, into an open star cluster of dozens of much more distant stars, likely mostly a true cluster (being gravitationally tied or associated). Measurements put them initially about 4,580 light years away; however, the same authors have refined their view and state that they are a further 4,420 light years away, in a report which invokes Early Gaia Data Release 3, and 6th "internal" Gaia-ESO survey measurements.
