= 3C 433 =

Galaxy in the constellation Vulpecula

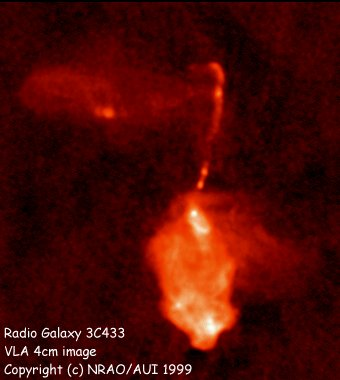

Observation data (J2000 epoch)
- Constellation: Vulpecula
- Right ascension: 21^{h} 23^{m} 44.852^{s}
- Declination: +25° 04′ 27.23″
- Redshift: 0.1016
- Distance: 404 megaparsecs (1,320 Mly) h^{−1}_{0.73}
- Apparent magnitude (V): 16.350

Characteristics
- Type: Sy2 Rad, AGN, G, X, rG, QSO; GPair, FR I, Sy 2
- Apparent size (V): 0.500' x 0.360'

Other designations
- DA 546, LEDA 66688, 3C 433, 4C 24.54

3C 433 is a Seyfert galaxy located in the constellation Vulpecula. It has a redshift of z =0.1016, and is classified as a peculiar radio galaxy with high luminosity other than its complex shell-type. Apart from that, it has a young stellar population and a radio structure mainly made up of knot and jet structures. Using mid-infrared wavelengths from Spitzer Observations, 3C 433 hosts a hidden quasar.
