= 3C 315 =

Radio galaxy located in the constellation Boötes

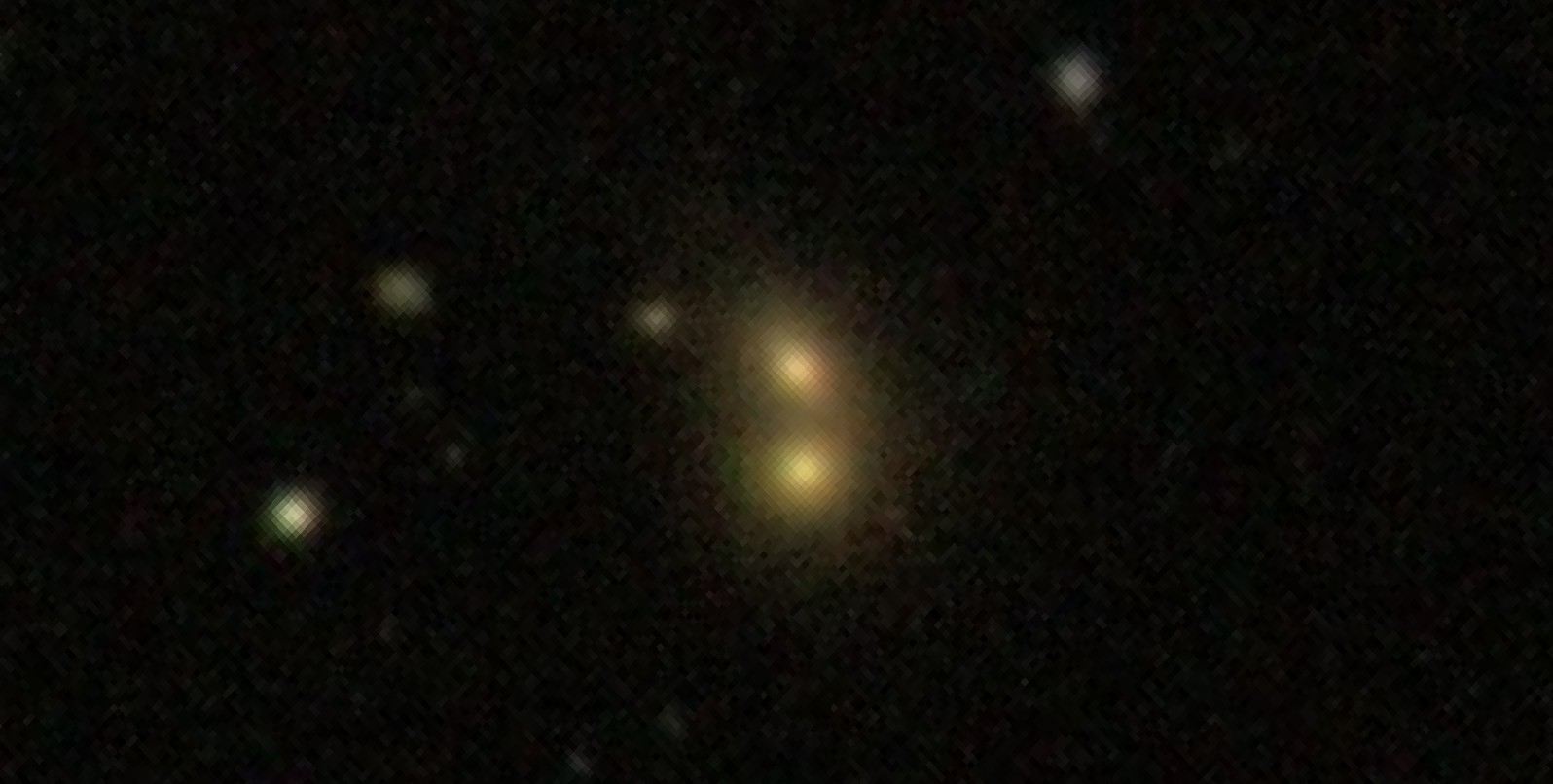
- Radio galaxy 3C 315 taken with SDSS.

Observation data (J2000.0 epoch)
- Constellation: Boötes
- Right ascension: 15^{h} 13^{m} 40.09^{s}
- Declination: +26° 07′ 31.86″
- Redshift: 0.108300
- Heliocentric radial velocity: 32,468 km/s
- Distance: 1.647 Gly
- Apparent magnitude (B): 16.30

Characteristics
- Type: Double galaxy NLRG

Other designations
- 4C +26.47, PKS 1511+26, PGC 54357, B2 1511+26, DA 377, NRAO 0472, CoNFIG 211, NVSS J151339+260733

3C 315 is a Fanaroff-Riley class type 2 radio galaxy located in the constellation of Boötes. It has a redshift of (z) 0.108 and it was first discovered by astronomers in 1962. This object is found to have a prototype X-shaped double radio source with its host, an elliptical galaxy being a member of a close double system.

== Description ==
3C 315 is described having a flattened appearance and a dust obscured central nucleus. Its nuclear ellipticity is found to decrease at a large radius and has a central elongated structure which suggests an edge-on stellar disk. It has an arc feature described as faint, which is located at a southern end of the galaxy. A large round galaxy companion is seen in the direction of south. The total star forming infrared luminosity of 3C 315 is estimated to be (1.4 ± 0.61) × 10^{10} L_{☉}.

The source of 3C 315 is found peculiar with a banana-shaped radio structure. When imaged, it has a central component resolved into two individual components that are extended on each side of the central object. These components are however elongated and are perpendicular to the axis source. The flux density of both components at 5.0 GHz are estimated to be 1.3 ± 0.2 10^{−26} W m^{−2} Hz^{−1}. The radio core is found associated with a much brighter member galaxy in the system according to Very Large Array observations. A weak hotspot is seen possibly located in the northeastern arm. Evidence also showed the source is found heavily polarized with the levels rising by 50% in the north point extension.

Spectral index mapping using radio maps at 1.65 and 2.7 GHz frequencies, have shown flat and steep spectral index regions located close to the core and at the tips of the radio lobes of 3C 315. Based on observations, both the northern and southern lobes have spectral indices of -1.46 and -1.26 at high frequencies, while most of the regions have a low-frequency measuring between -0.78 and -1.31. The wings located at northeast and southeast have measured spectra indices of -1.31 ± 0.03 and -1.27 ± 0.02 respectively. A study published in 2024 suggested the X-shaped source of 3C 315 might be influenced through environmental factors, given the galaxy host's location inside a cluster.
