= 31 Vulpeculae =

Star in the constellation Vulpecula

- Location of 31 Vulpeculae (circled)

Observation data Epoch J2000 Equinox ICRS
- Constellation: Vulpecula
- Right ascension: 20^{h} 52^{m} 07.69021^{s}
- Declination: +27° 05′ 48.9991″
- Apparent magnitude (V): 4.56

Characteristics
- Evolutionary stage: red clump
- Spectral type: G7IIIa Fe-1 Ba
- U−B color index: +0.46
- B−V color index: +0.82
- Variable type: suspected

Astrometry
Radial velocity (R_{v})	+0.42±0.77 km/s
Proper motion (μ)	RA: −76.611 mas/yr Dec.: −56.516 mas/yr
Parallax (π)	14.7064±0.1590 mas
Distance	222 ± 2 ly (68.0 ± 0.7 pc)
Absolute magnitude (M_{V})	0.77

Orbit
Period (P)	1,860.6±1.3 d
Semi-major axis (a)	≥ 103.0 Gm
Eccentricity (e)	0.375±0.009
Periastron epoch (T)	52,316±6 MJD
Argument of periastron (ω) (secondary)	15.1±1.4°
Semi-amplitude (K_{1}) (primary)	4.34±0.04 km/s

Details

31 Vul A
Mass	2.40±0.05 M_{☉}
Radius	8.01±0.30 R_{☉}
Luminosity	52.53 L_{☉}
Surface gravity (log g)	2.97±0.05 cgs
Temperature	5,261±15 K
Metallicity [Fe/H]	−0.05±0.02 dex
Rotational velocity (v sin i)	5.9±0.3 km/s
Age	700±40 Myr

Other designations
- 31 Vul, BD+26°4017, GC 29112, HD 198809, HIP 103004, HR 7995, SAO 89228, 2MASS J20520768+2705491

Database references
SIMBAD	data

31 Vulpeculae is a binary star system in the northern constellation of Vulpecula. It is visible to the naked eye as a faint, yellow-hued point of light with an apparent visual magnitude of 4.56. The system is located approximately 222 light-years away from the Sun based on parallax, and it is drifting further away with a radial velocity of +0.42 km/s.

The variable radial velocity of this system was first suspected by German Astronomer Friedrich Küstner in 1914. The system appears as a single-lined spectroscopic binary with an orbital period of 5.1 years and an eccentricity of 0.38. The a sin i value for the primary is 103.0 ± 1.1 Gm (0.69 ± 0.01 AU), where a is the semimajor axis and i is the (unknown) orbital inclination. This value provides a lower bound on the actual semimajor axis for the orbit.

The primary component is an aging giant star with a stellar classification of G7IIIa Fe-1 Ba, indicating a mild barium star with an underabundance of iron. Having exhausted the supply of hydrogen at its core, it has expanded to eight times the Sun's radius. It is a red clump giant, which indicates it is on the horizontal branch and is generating energy through helium fusion at its core. This is a suspected variable star with a magnitude that varies from 3.77 to 4.08 in the I passband. It is about 700 million years old with 2.4 times the mass of the Sun. The star is radiating 53 times the luminosity of the Sun from its enlarged photosphere at an effective temperature of 5,261 K. The companion may be a degenerate white dwarf with about 0.4 M_{☉}.
