= Alpha Vulpeculae =

Star in the constellation Vulpecula

α Vulpeculae
- Location of α Vulpeculae (circled)

Observation data Epoch J2000 Equinox ICRS
- Constellation: Vulpecula
- Right ascension: 19^{h} 28^{m} 42.3299^{s}
- Declination: +24° 39′ 53.661″
- Apparent magnitude (V): 4.40

Characteristics
- Evolutionary stage: red giant
- Spectral type: M1 III
- U−B color index: +1.81
- B−V color index: 1.487
- Variable type: suspected

Astrometry
Radial velocity (R_{v})	−84.91±0.26 km/s
Proper motion (μ)	RA: −126.197±0.071 mas/yr Dec.: −106.865±0.111 mas/yr
Parallax (π)	11.2238±0.1129 mas
Distance	291 ± 3 ly (89.1 ± 0.9 pc)
Absolute magnitude (M_{V})	−0.36

Details
Mass	0.97±0.02 M_{☉}
Radius	41.48±0.41 R_{☉}
Luminosity	416±30 L_{☉}
Surface gravity (log g)	1.30 cgs
Temperature	3,967±50 K
Metallicity [Fe/H]	-0.38 dex
Rotational velocity (v sin i)	4.6 km/s
Age	11.30±0.54 Gyr

Other designations
- Anser, α Vul, 6 Vulpeculae, BD+24°3759, FK5 1508, HD 183439, HIP 95771, HR 7405, SAO 87261, CCDM J19288+2442A, WDS J19287+2440A

Database references
SIMBAD	data

Alpha Vulpeculae (α Vulpeculae, abbreviated Alpha Vul, α Vul), officially named Anser /ˈænsər/, is the brightest star in the constellation of Vulpecula. It is approximately 291 light-years from Earth. It forms a wide optical binary with 8 Vulpeculae.

Alpha Vulpeculae is a red giant of spectral class M1 and has an apparent magnitude of +4.4. It has been analyzed as a member of the Arcturus stream, a group of stars with high proper motion and metal-poor properties thought to be the remnants of a small galaxy consumed by the Milky Way.

== Nomenclature ==
α Vulpeculae (Latinised to Alpha Vulpeculae) is the system's Bayer designation.

It bore the traditional name Anser, derived from when the constellation had the name Vulpecula cum Ansere 'the little fox with the goose'. In 2016, the IAU organized a Working Group on Star Names (WGSN) to catalog and standardize proper names for stars. The WGSN approved the name Anser for this star on 30 June 2017 and it is now so included in the List of IAU-approved Star Names.

== Description ==
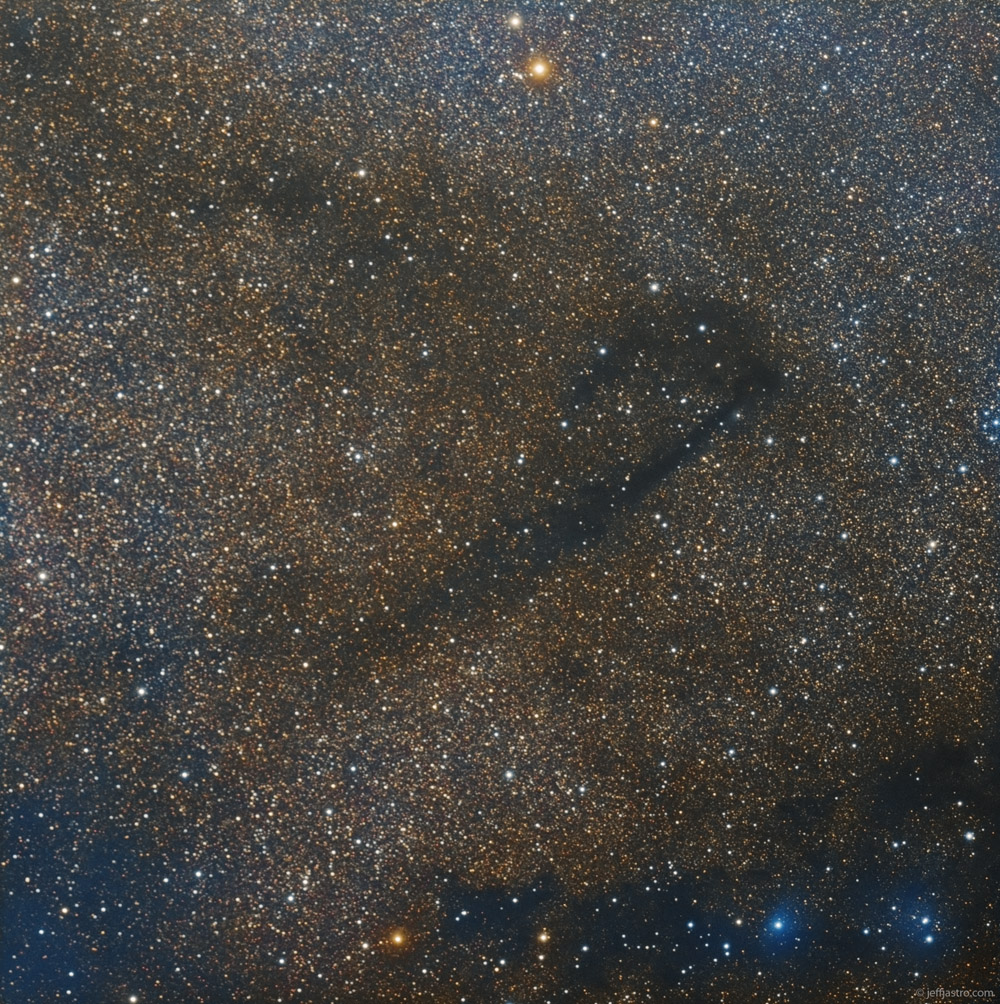
Amateur image of the dark nebula LDN 778 (center) and Alpha Vulpeculae, (red giant, top center).

α Vulpeculae has evolved away from the main sequence after exhausting its core hydrogen and is now a red giant, probably on the red giant branch. It is about 11.3 billion years since it first formed. It has a radius of 41.4 R_{☉}, an effective surface temperature of 3,690 K and a bolometric luminosity of 416 L_{☉}.

α Vulpeculae has been suspected to be variable in brightness by about a tenth of a magnitude, but this has never been confirmed. Analysis of the isotopic ratios in its photosphere show that it has a mass less than 1.5 M_{☉} and has not yet evolved to the asymptotic giant branch and experienced a third dredge up.
