= Vulpecula =

Constellation in the northern celestial hemisphere

- Constellation
- List of stars in Vulpecula
- Abbreviation: Vul
- Genitive: Vulpeculae
- Pronunciation: /vəlˈpɛkjʊlə/, genitive /vəlˈpɛkjʊliː/
- Symbolism: the Fox
- Right ascension: 20^{h}
- Declination: +25°
- Quadrant: NQ4
- Area: 268 sq. deg. (55th)
- Main stars: 5, 20
- Bayer/Flamsteed stars: 33
- Stars with planets: 5
- Stars brighter than 3.00^{m}: 0
- Stars within 10.00 pc (32.62 ly): 1
- Brightest star: α Vul (Anser) (4.44^{m})
- Nearest star: WISE 1928+2356
- Messier objects: 1
- Bordering constellations: Cygnus; Lyra; Hercules; Sagitta; Delphinus; Pegasus
- Visible at latitudes between +90° and −55°. Best visible at 21:00 (9 p.m.) during the month of September.

Vulpecula (/vəlˈpɛkjʊlə/) is a faint constellation in the Northern Sky. Its name is Latin for "little fox", although it is commonly called simply the Fox. It was identified in the 17th century, and is located in the middle of the Summer Triangle (an asterism consisting of the bright stars Deneb, Vega and Altair).

== Features ==
Vulpecula in the night sky

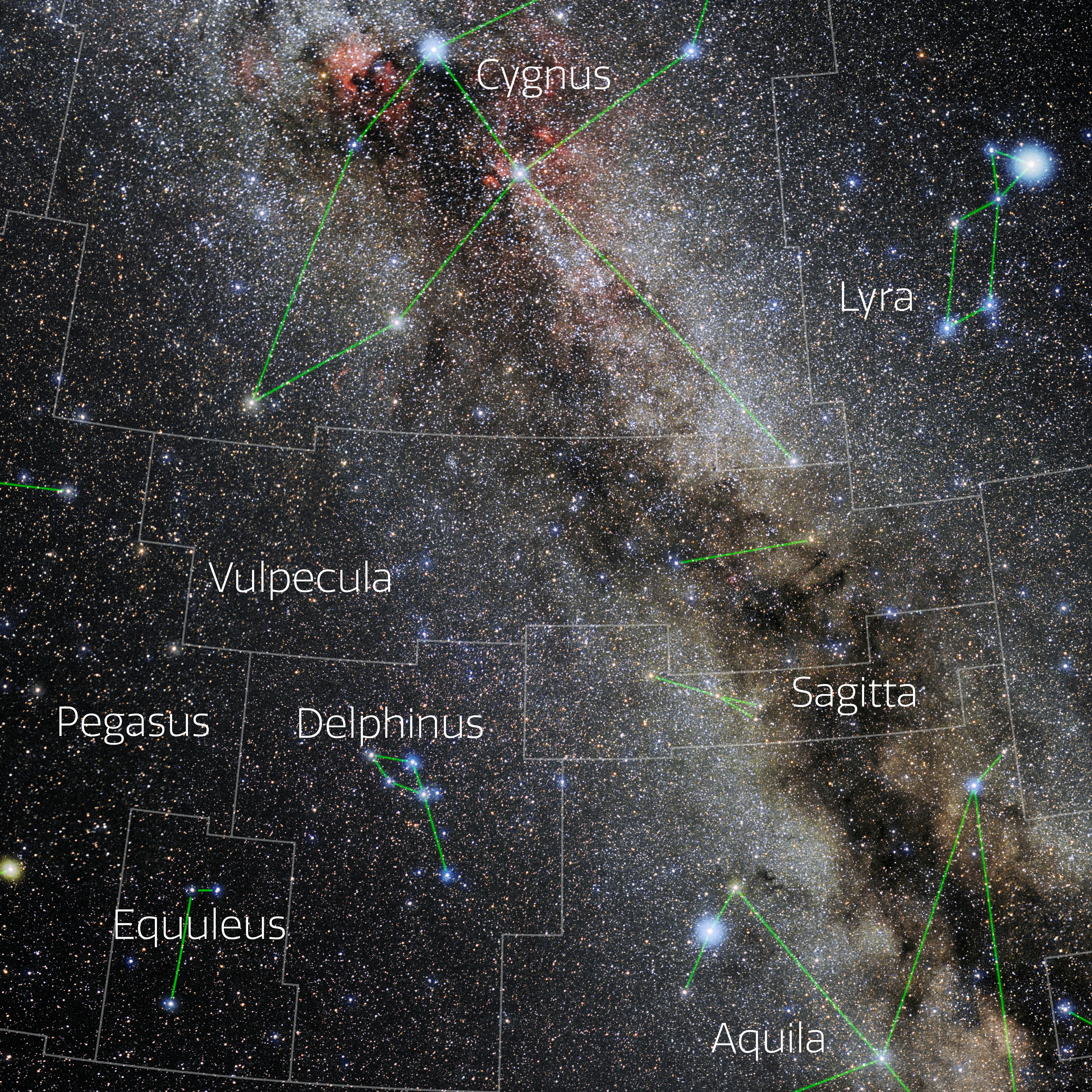
Vulpecula with IAU boundaries, from NOIRLab's 88 Constellations project

=== Stars ===
There are no stars brighter than 4th magnitude in this constellation. The brightest star in Vulpecula is Alpha Vulpeculae, a magnitude 4.44^{m} red giant at an approximate distance of 291 light-years. The star is an optical binary (separation of 413.7") that can be split using binoculars. The star also carries the traditional name Anser, which refers to the goose the little fox holds in its jaws.

Instead of Beta, 23 Vulpeculae is the second-brightest star in the constellation.

In 1967, the first pulsar, PSR B1919+21, was discovered in Vulpecula by Jocelyn Bell, supervised by Antony Hewish, in Cambridge. While they were searching for scintillation of radio signals of quasars, they observed pulses which repeated with a period of 1.3373 seconds. Terrestrial origin of the signal was ruled out because the time it took the object to reappear was a sidereal day instead of a solar day. This anomaly was finally identified as the signal of a rapidly rotating neutron star. Fifteen years after the first pulsar was discovered, the first millisecond pulsar, PSR B1937+21, was also discovered in Vulpecula, only a few degrees in the sky away from PSR B1919+21.

Vulpecula is also home to HD 189733 b, one of the closest extrasolar planets studied by the now-retired Spitzer Space Telescope. On 11 July 2007, a team led by Giovanna Tinetti published the results of their observations using the Spitzer Space Telescope concluding there is solid evidence for significant amounts of water vapor in the planet's atmosphere. Although HD 189733b with atmospheric temperatures rising above 1,000 °C is far from being habitable, this finding increases the likelihood that water, an essential component of life, would be found on a more Earth-like planet in the future.

Also located in Vulpecula is soft gamma repeater SGR 1935+2154. In 2020 it emitted a fast radio burst, the first one to be observed in the Milky Way.

=== Deep-sky objects ===
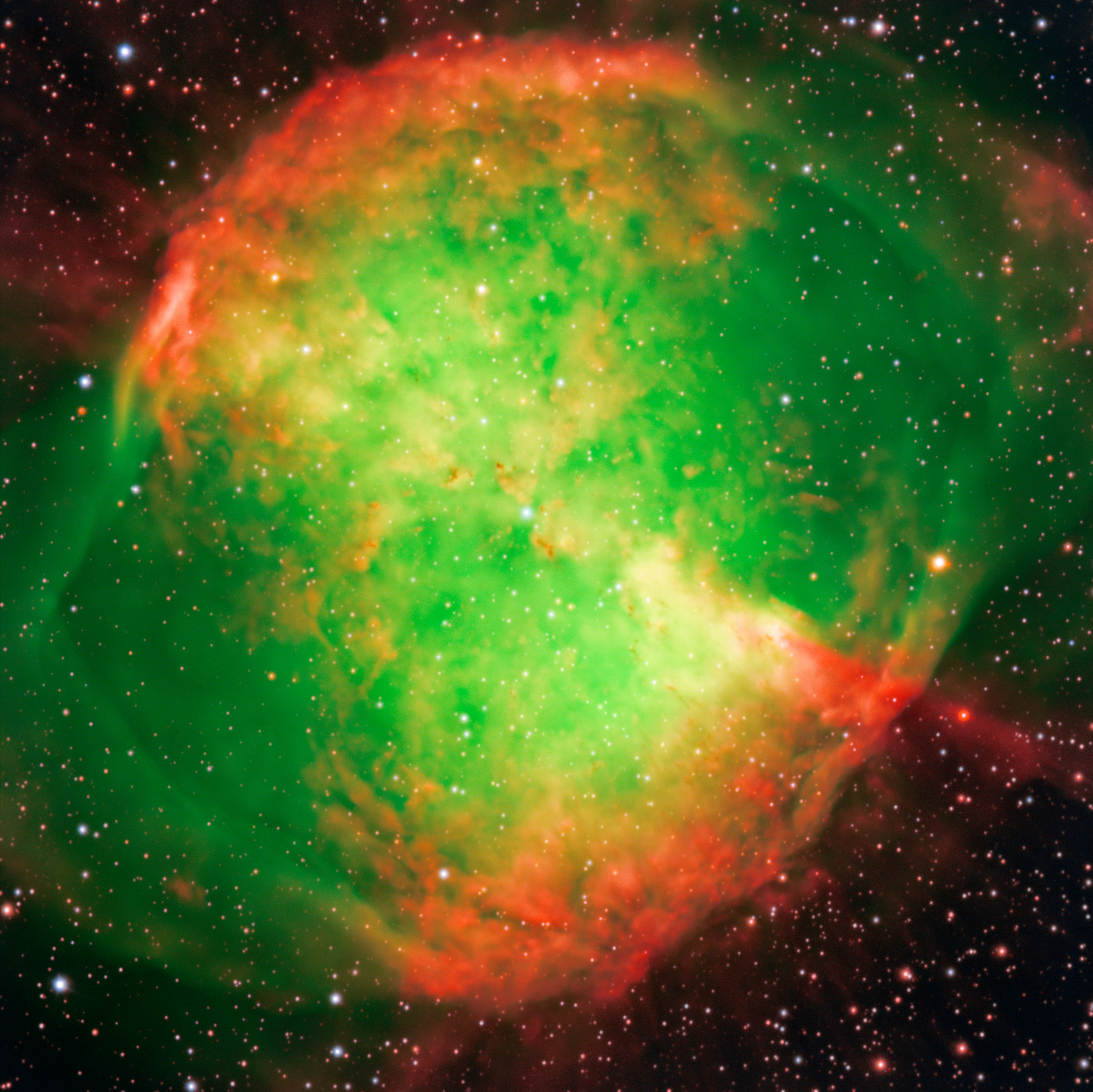
The Dumbbell Nebula

The Dumbbell Nebula (M27) is a large, bright planetary nebula which was discovered by the French astronomer Charles Messier in 1764 as the very first object of its kind. It can be seen with good binoculars in a dark-sky location, appearing as a dimly glowing disk approximately 8 arcminutes in diameter. The nebula is approximately 9,800 years old. A telescope reveals its double-lobed shape, similar to that of an hourglass. Brocchi's Cluster (Collinder 399) is an asterism formerly thought to be an open cluster. It is also called "the Coathanger" because of its distinctive star pattern when viewed with binoculars or a low power telescope.

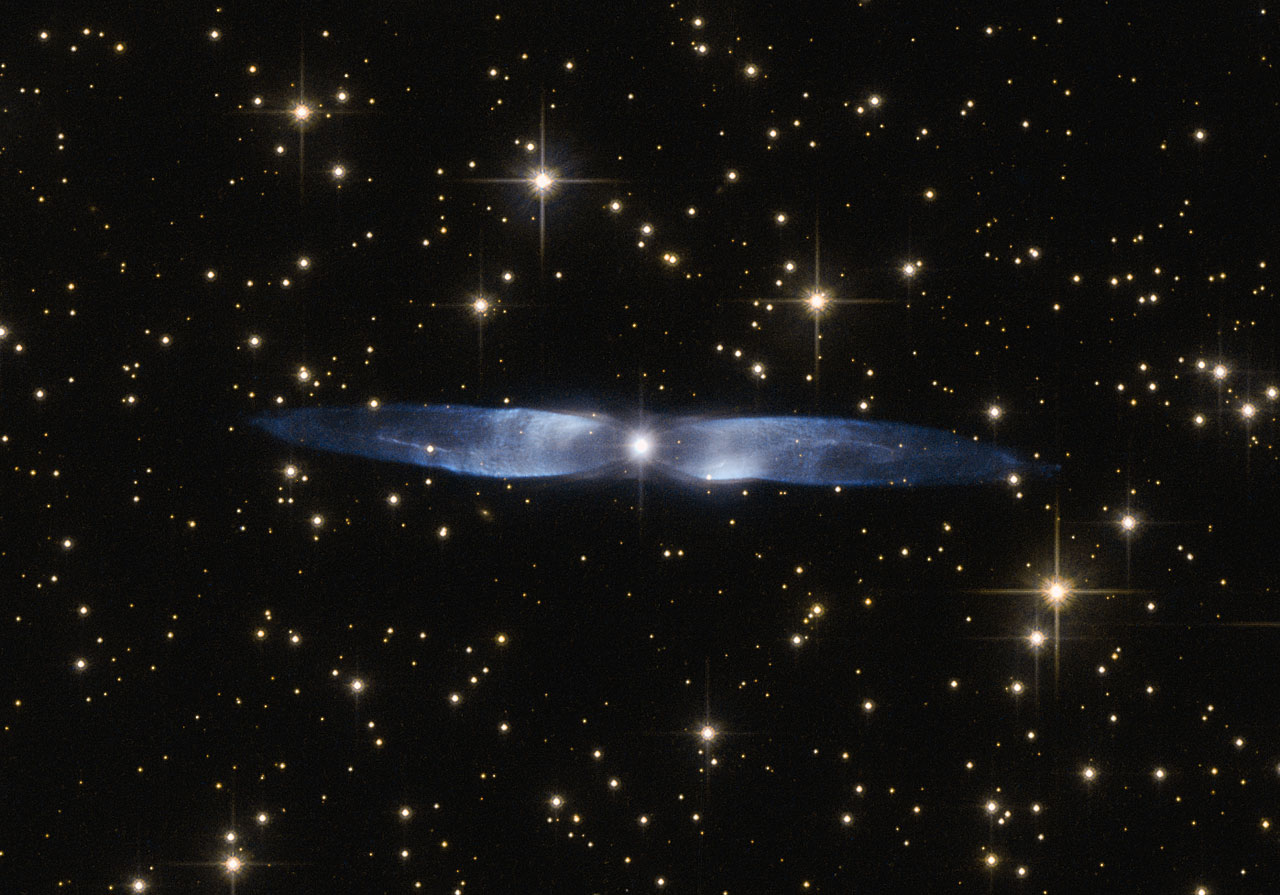
The planetary nebula Hen 2-437 is located in the constellation of Vulpecula.

NGC 7052 is an elliptical galaxy in Vulpecula at a distance of 214 million light-years from Earth. It has a central dusty disk with a diameter of 3700 light-years; there is a supermassive black hole with a mass of 300 million solar masses in its nucleus. Astronomers surmise that the disk is the remnant of a smaller galaxy that merged with NGC 7052. Jets can be seen emanating from the galaxy, and it has very strong radio emissions. This means that it is also classified as a radio galaxy.

The eastern part of Vulpecula is occupied by the Hercules–Corona Borealis Great Wall. It is a galaxy filament, with the length of 3,000 megaparsecs, making it the largest known structure in the universe.

=== Stellar association ===
Vulpecula contains an OB-association of young stars, called the Vulpecula OB-association or Vul OB1. The association contains nearly 100 OB stars and over 800 young stellar objects. It lies in the galactic plane, at a distance of about 2,300 parsec. It contains the emission-line nebulae Sh-86, Sh-87 and Sh-88. Vul OB1 has a length of about 100 parsec and is sculpting many pillar-like structures in this region.

== History ==
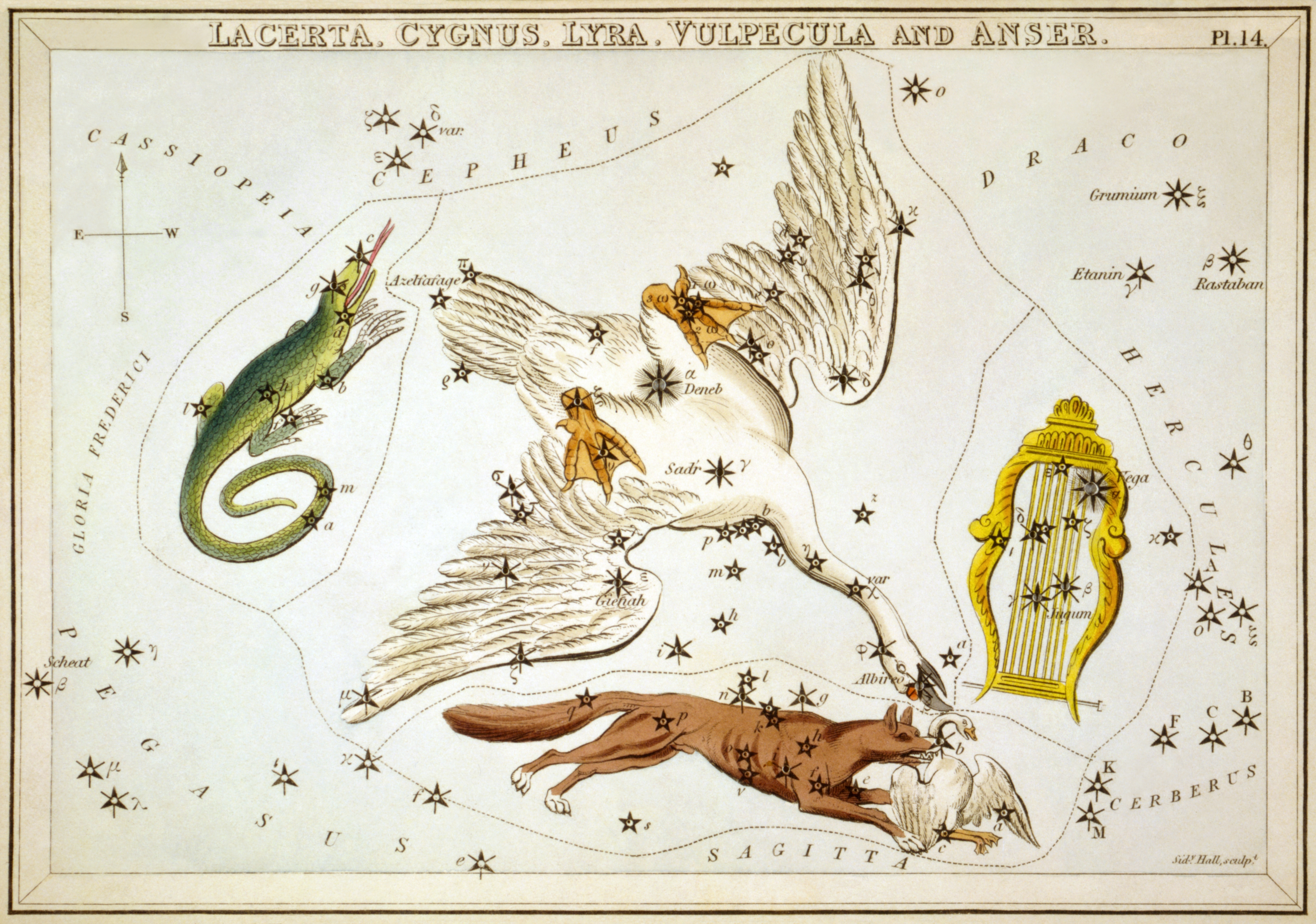
"Vulpecula and Anser" (bottom) from Urania's Mirror (1824)

In the late 17th century, the astronomer Johannes Hevelius created Vulpecula. It was originally known as Vulpecula cum ansere ("the little fox with the goose") or Vulpecula et Anser ("the little fox and the goose"), and was illustrated with a goose in the jaws of a fox. Hevelius did not regard the fox and the goose to be two separate constellations, but later the stars were divided into a separate Anser and Vulpecula. Today, they have been merged again under the name of the fox, but the goose is remembered by the name of the star α Vulpeculae: Anser.

== See also ==
- 3C 433
- Vulpecula (Chinese astronomy)
