= Exocomet =

Comet outside the Solar System

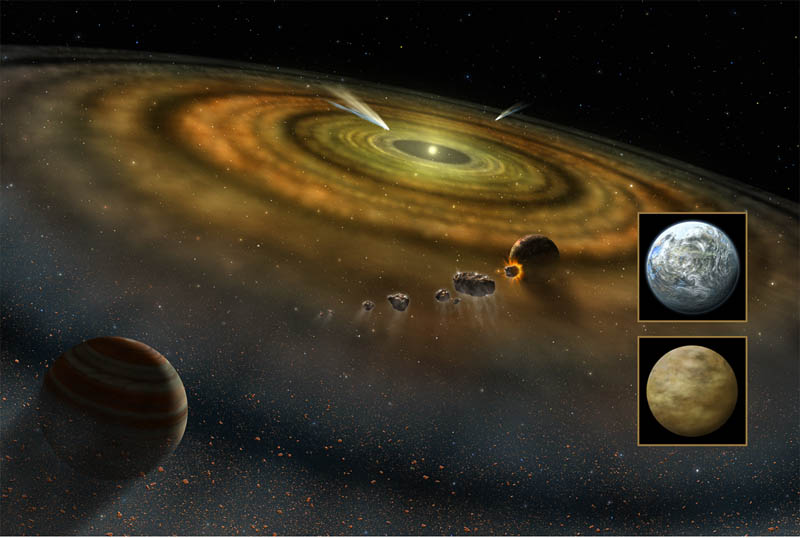
Exocomets and various planet-formation processes around Beta Pictoris, a very young A-type main-sequence star (NASA; artist's conception).

An exocomet, or extrasolar comet, is a comet outside the Solar System, which includes rogue comets and comets that orbit stars other than the Sun. The first exocomets were detected in 1987 around Beta Pictoris, a very young A-type main-sequence star. There are now (as of February 2019) a total of 27 stars around which exocomets have been observed or suspected.

The majority of discovered exocometary systems (Beta Pictoris, HR 10, 51 Ophiuchi, HR 2174, HD 85905, 49 Ceti, 5 Vulpeculae, 2 Andromedae, HD 21620, Rho Virginis, HD 145964, HD 172555, Lambda Geminorum, HD 58647, Phi Geminorum, Delta Corvi, HD 109573, Phi Leonis, 35 Aquilae, HD 24966, HD 38056, HD 79469 and HD 225200) are around very young A-type stars. The relatively old shell star Phi Leonis shows evidence of exocomets in the spectrum and comet-like activity was detected around the old F2V-type star Eta Corvi. In 2018 transiting exocomets were discovered around F-type stars, using data from the Kepler space telescope. Some late B-type star (e.g. 51 Ophiuchi, HD 58647) are known to host exocomets.

Observations of comets, and especially exocomets, improve scientists' understanding of planet formation. Indeed, in the standard model of planet formation by accretion, planets are the result of the agglomeration of planetesimals, themselves formed by the coalescence of dust from the protoplanetary disk surrounding the star shortly after its formation. Thus, comets are the residuals of the volatile-rich planetesimals that remained in the planetary system without having been incorporated into the planets. They are considered fossil bodies that have seen the physical and chemical conditions prevailing at the time of planet formation.

Researching exocomets might provide answers to fundamental questions of the past of the solar system and the development of a life-supporting environment. Researchers can investigate the transport of water, cyanides, sulfides and pre-biotic molecules onto Earth-mass exoplanets with the help of exocomets.

== Nomenclature ==
The scientific term of an exocomet is Falling Evaporating Body (FEB). The term Evaporating Infalling Bodies (EIBs) was first used, but eventually the term FEBs was adopted from the "Falling Evaporating Bodies" model or Falling Evaporating Body (FEB) scenario.

A system of nomenclature for individual exocomets was proposed in 2026 by Alain Lecavelier des Etangs, Paul A. Strøm, and Darryl Z. Seligman. In this system, the designation of an exocomet begins with the name of its host star (as for exoplanets), followed by the letter C (for comet) and the date the exocomet was first observed, in the format YYYYMMDD. If multiple exocomets in the same system were observed on the same date, an additional lowercase letter is added. For example, the first observed exocomet (described by Ferlet et al. 1987) would be designated "β Pic C19841113".

This nomenclature is used in another 2026 paper with Lecavelier des Etangs as a co-author. This paper reports the detection of three exocomets around β Pictoris, all observed on the same day and designated β Pic C20250429a, b, and c.

== Observation ==
The exocomets can be detected by spectroscopy as they transit their host stars. The transits of exocomets, like the transits of exoplanets, produce variations in the light received from the star. Changes are observed in the absorption lines of the stellar spectrum: the occultation of the star by the gas cloud coming from the exocomet produces additional absorption features beyond those normally seen in that star, like those observed in the ionized calcium lines. As the comet comes close enough to the star, cometary gas is evolved from the evaporation of volatile ices and dust with it. The absorption lines of a star hosting exocomets represent, beside a stable component, one or several variable redshifted components. The variable components change on short-time scales of one hour. The variable component represent the exocomets. The exocomet falls towards the star and any absorption line produced by the evaporation of the exocomet is redshifted compared to the absorption line of the star.

Observations of HR 10 with the PIONIER (VLTI) and 32 years of radial velocity observations revealed that this exocomet host candidate turned out to be a binary star with each star being surrounded by a circumstellar shell. This new result can explain the variable spectral lines without exocomets. The study points out that 50% of the A-type stars could be resolved into binaries in the future and more systems with variable spectral lines attributed to exocomets could turn out to be binaries.

Transiting exocomets were first detected around KIC 3542116 and possibly KIC 11084727 by a group of citizen scientists and professional astronomers. The Kepler mission detected asymmetrical dips around KIC 3542116, a F2V-type star that are consistent with models of transiting exocomets. The dips were found by one of the authors, a Planet Hunters participant, in a visual search over 5 months of the complete Q1-Q17 Kepler light curve archive spanning 201250 target stars. TESS did observe transits of exocomets around Beta Pictoris. The shape of a dip caused by a transiting exocomet is modelled as a very specific "rounded triangular" shape and can be distinguished from most transiting exoplanets. A transiting exocomet around HD 182952 (KIC 8027456) is the first exocomet found in an automated search for transiting exocomets. Irregular dimming events around KIC 8462852 have been interpreted as exocomets, but the shape of the dips are different from discovered exocomet transits.

During formation of the Oort Cloud through planetary perturbations, stellar encounters, and the galactic tide, a comet can be ejected and leave the solar system. Binary systems are another possible source of ejected exocomets. These ejected exocomets belong to the interstellar comets and can be observed directly if they enter the solar system.

Observations of β Pictoris with TESS in 2022 led to the discovery of 30 new exocomets.

=== Indirect evidence of exocomets ===
Exocomets are suggested as one source of white dwarf pollution. After a star from the main sequence becomes a giant star, it loses mass. Planetesimals in an analog of the solar Oort Cloud can be directed toward the inner stellar system. This is a consequence of the mass-loss during the AGB stage. The giant star will eventually become a white dwarf and an exocomet that gets too close to the white dwarf will sublimate or tidal disrupted by the gravity of the white dwarf. This will produce dusty debris around the white dwarf, which is measurable in infrared wavelengths. The material can be accreted by the white dwarf and pollute the atmosphere. This pollution appears in the spectra of a white dwarf as metal lines. In 2017 a study concluded that spectral lines in the white dwarf WD 1425+540 are attributed to an accretion of a Kuiper-Belt analog. Kuiper-Belt objects are icy bodies in the solar system that sometimes become comets. Dusty material around the white dwarf G 29-38 and WD 1337+705 also has been attributed to an exocomet.

Carbon monoxide gas was found in debris disks around mostly A-type stars with an age between 10 and 50 Myrs, but in some cases in older systems (e.g. Eta Corvi 1-2 Gyrs) and in colder systems (TWA 7). It is not clear if this gas is primordial or secondary produced by collision of exocomets. Around 30 such systems exist. Carbon monoxide gas around 49 Ceti has been attributed to the collisions of comets in that planetary system. Observations of HD 110058 with VLT/CRIRES+ did show that the CO-rich disk is significantly poor in H_{2}. This supports exocometary origin for CO-rich disks.

== Gallery ==
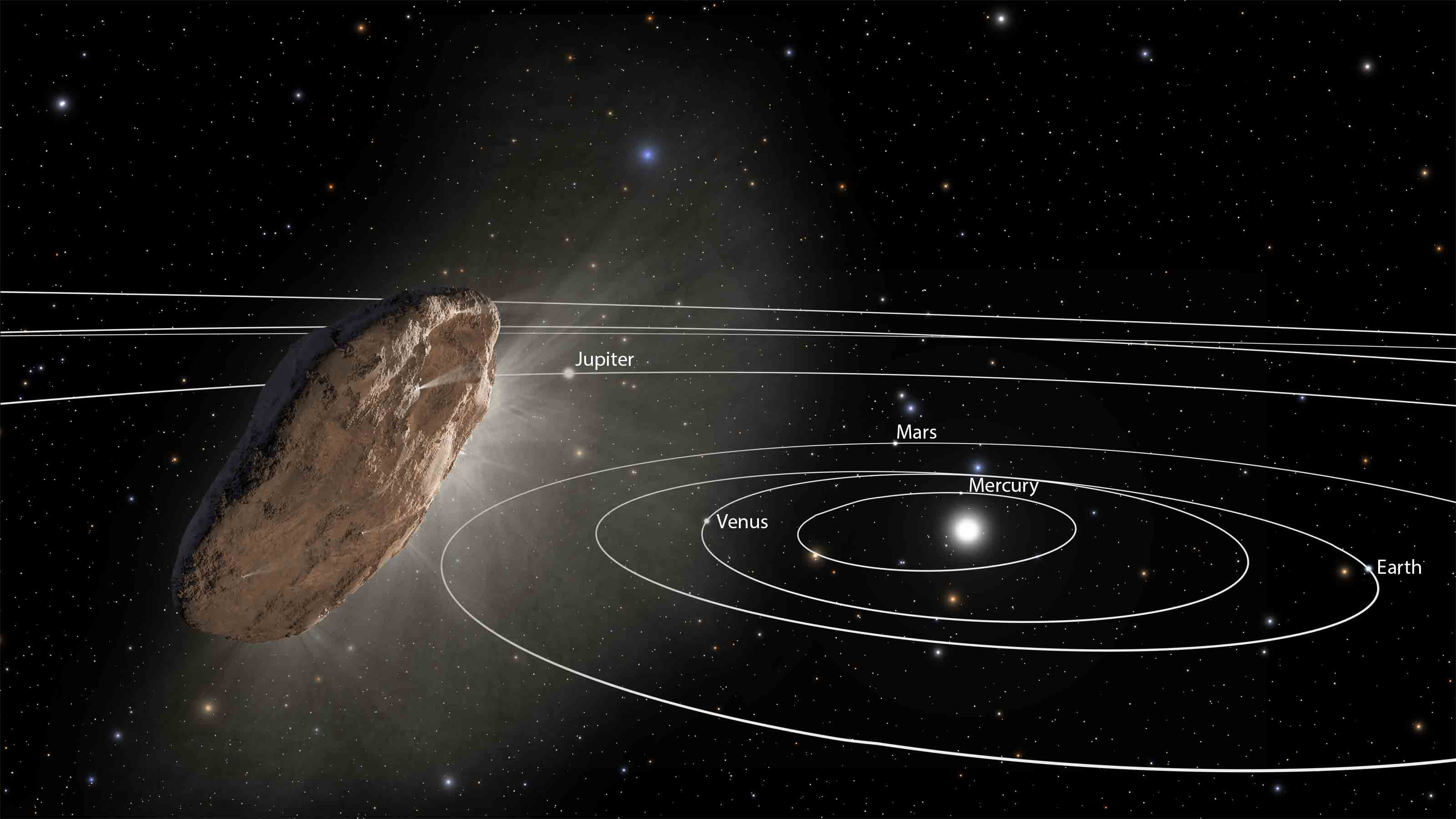
Interstellar object ʻOumuamua exiting the Solar System (artist concept) (animation)

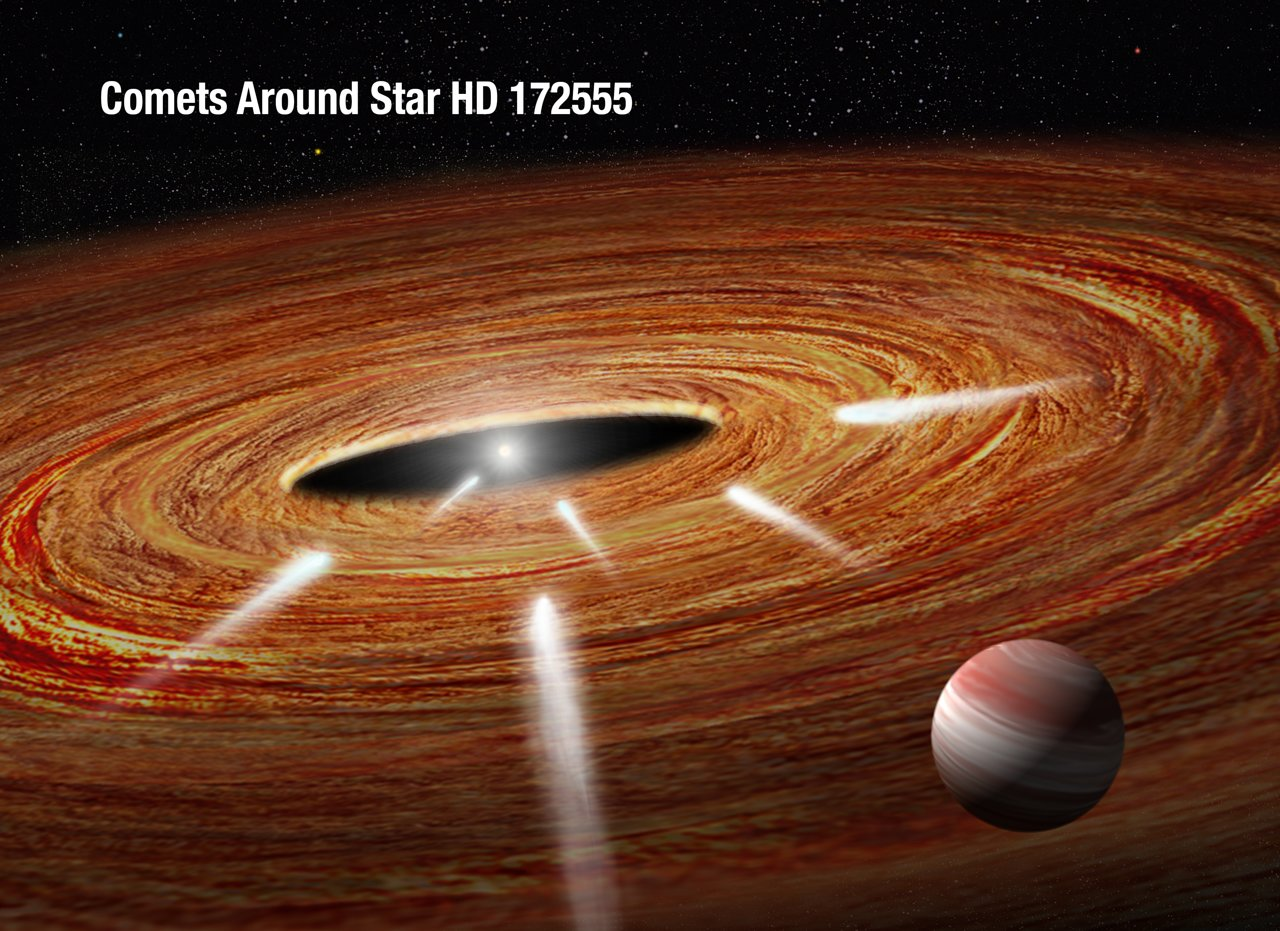
Artist's impression of exocomets plunging into young star HD 172555.

Video – artist's impression of exocomets orbiting the star Beta Pictoris.

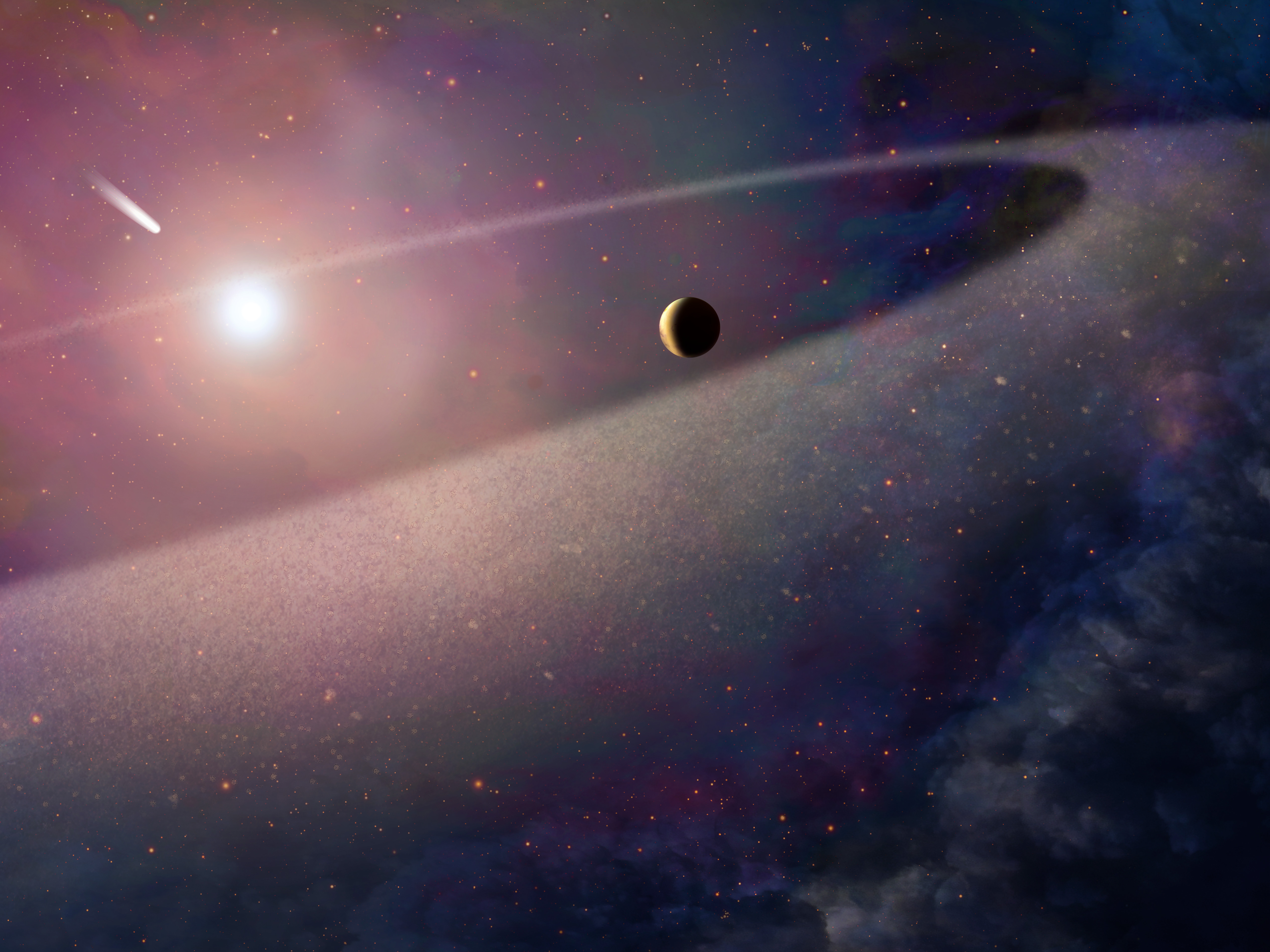
Artist's impression of an exocomet falling into white dwarf WD 1425+540.

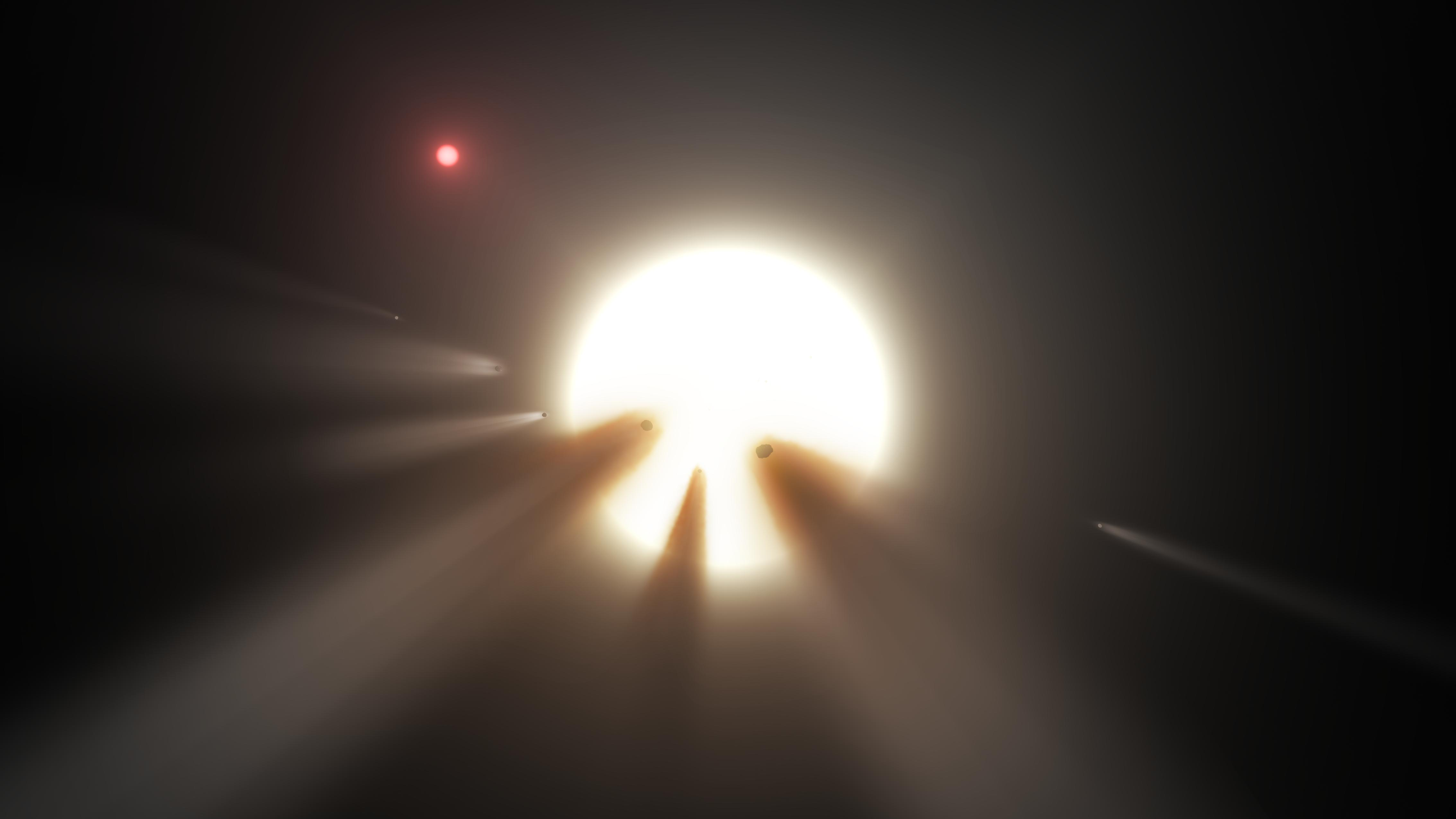
Artist's concept of a cloud of disintegrating exocomets around KIC 8462852 (Tabby's Star).

== See also ==
- Exomoon – Moon beyond the Solar System
- Exoplanet – Planet outside of the Solar System
- Interstellar object – Astronomical object not gravitationally bound to a star
- Kepler space telescope – NASA space telescope for exoplanetology (2009–2018)
- List of stars that dim oddly
- Rogue planet – Planet not gravitationally bound to a star
- 2I/Borisov – Interstellar comet in 2019
