= KIC 3542116 =

F-type star in the constellation Lyra

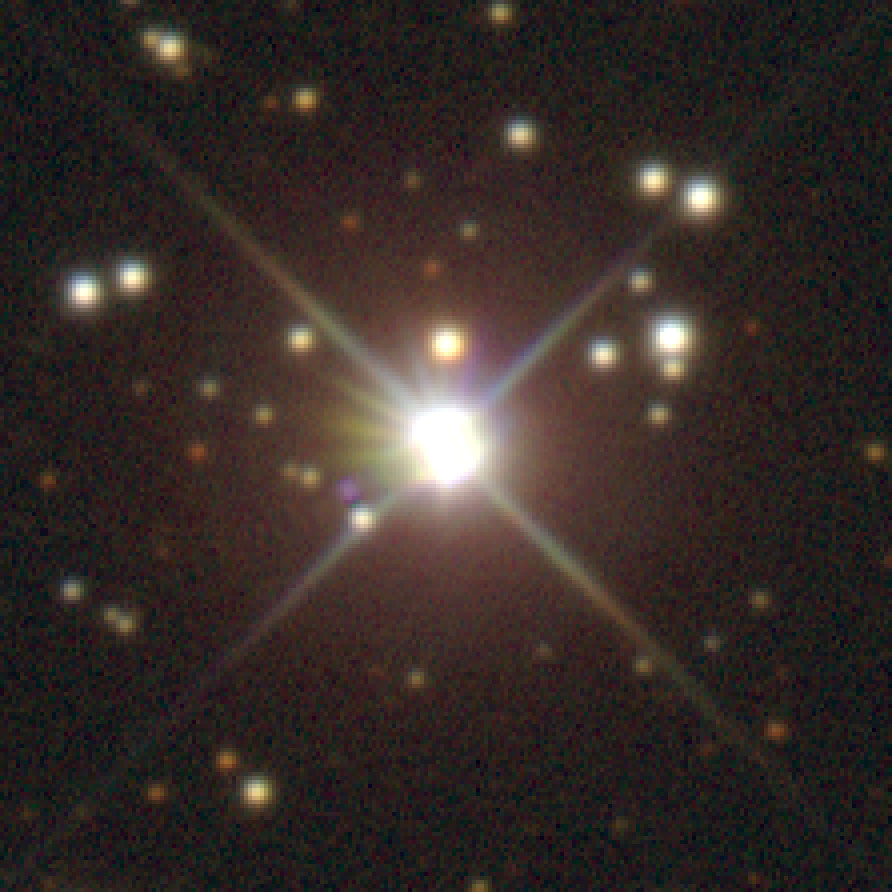
- SDSS image of KIC 3542116 (center) with its orange companion (KOI-4987) at the top.

Observation data Epoch J2000 Equinox J2000
- Constellation: Lyra
- Right ascension: 19^{h} 22^{m} 52.9408736880^{s}
- Declination: +38° 41′ 41.489123208″
- Apparent magnitude (V): 10.03

Characteristics
- Evolutionary stage: main-sequence star
- Spectral type: F2V
- Variable type: rotational variable

Astrometry
Radial velocity (R_{v})	–21.1 ± 0.7 km/s
Proper motion (μ)	RA: 6.320±0.013 mas/yr Dec.: -3.016±0.015 mas/yr
Parallax (π)	4.4194±0.0115 mas
Distance	738 ± 2 ly (226.3 ± 0.6 pc)

Details
Mass	1.47 ±0.10 M_{☉}
Radius	1.56 ±0.15 R_{☉}
Surface gravity (log g)	4.22 ±0.12 cgs
Temperature	6918 ±122 K
Metallicity	0.04 ±0.11
Rotation	1.08 ±0.02 days
Rotational velocity (v sin i)	57.3 ±0.3 km/s

Other designations
- TYC 3134-1024-1, GSC 03134-01024, LAMOST J192252.93+384141.4, 2MASS J19225293+3841415, TIC 122519163, Gaia DR1 2052852771010196992

Database references
SIMBAD	data
KIC	data

KIC 3542116 (also called TYC 3134-1024-1) is an F-type star in the constellation Lyra. Around this star the first detection of transiting exocomets were made in 2018.

== Host star ==
KIC 3542116 has a spectral type of F2V from spectroscopy taken at the Fred Lawrence Whipple Observatory. While the star does not show clear signs of being young, the scientists suspect the star to be young. The star is co-moving with a M1.9-type red dwarf called KOI-4987 (KIC 3542117); a planet candidate around this star, KOI-4987.01, is a false positive. This star has an 23 day rotation that leaks into the Kepler light curve of KIC 3542116.

== Exocomets ==
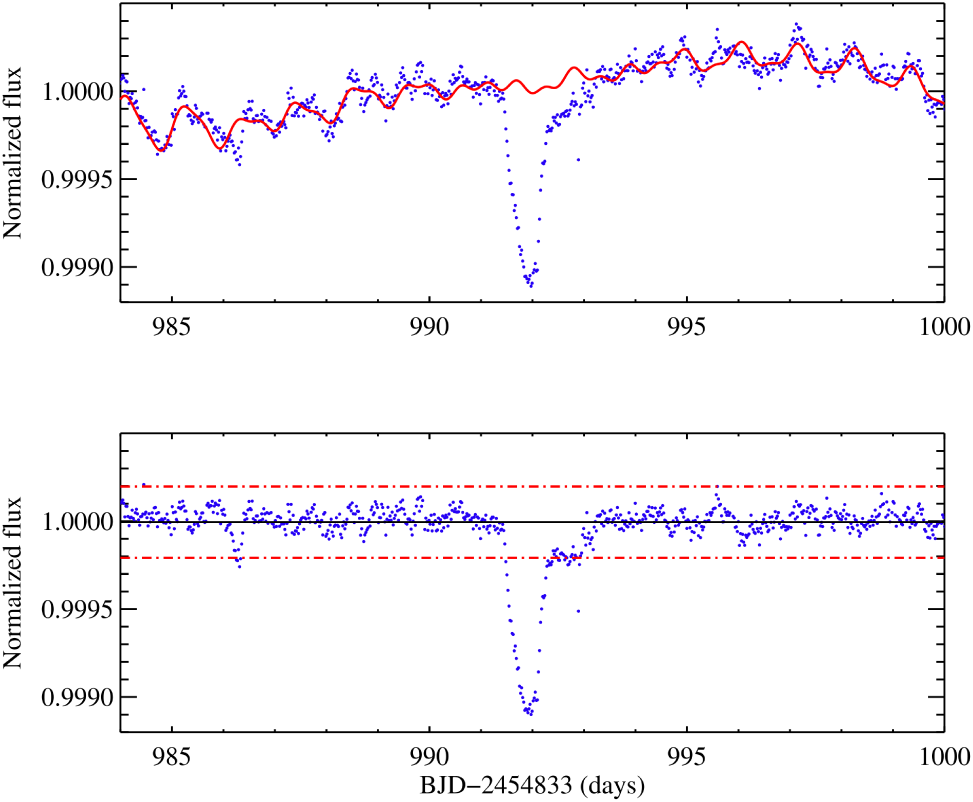
light curve showing the deepest exocomet transit of KIC 3542116. Top shows the variability by the star and the transit and bottom has the variability removed. Figure 1 by Luk’yanyk et al. 2024

The employment consultant and citizen scientists of the Planet Hunters project Thomas Jacobs did look through light curves of 201,250 target stars from the Kepler Space Telescope and found three potential transiting exocomets around KIC 3542116. Three more shallow transits were later discovered in the light curve. Transiting exocomets were already modelled in the 90s by A. Lecavelier Des Etangs et al. This team predicted a rounded triangular shape that is distinct from transiting exoplanets. The team of scientists found just such a shape, with a "steeper ingresses with positive curvature, followed by longer egresses with negative curvature" for the three deeper transits. The transits were later also detected in an automated search for exocomets. Another work did detect 8 transits in total (including previous detected transits). Modelling did show that the transits agree well with known comets from the Solar System, such as Halley's Comet, comet Hale–Bopp and C/2006 S3 (LONEOS). The shallow transits are produced by comets moving closer to the star (about 1 astronomical unit) and produce dust particles with a size of 0.1 and 20 μm. The deeper transits are produced by comets orbiting further away (around 5 astronomical units) and produce larger dust particles with a size greater than 5 μm. The study has shown that the shape of the transit is influenced by a varaiety of factors, such as particle size, distribution and distance to the star. The depth and duration of the transit is influenced by the dust productivity of the comet nucleus and the impact parameter. The dust productivity is higher for exocomets with shallow dips that orbit the star closer.
