= WD 1425+540 =

White dwarf in the constellation Boötes

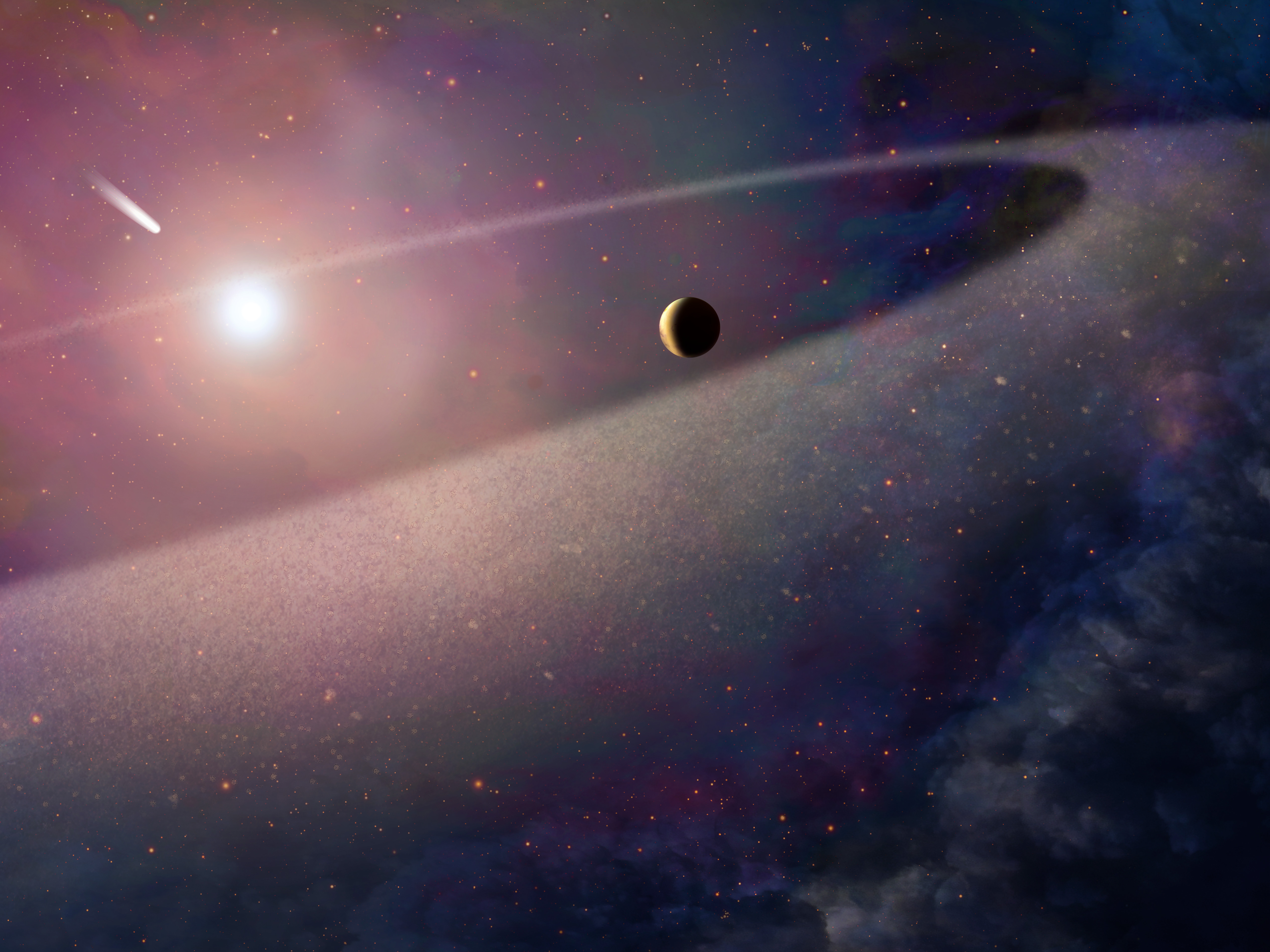
- Artist's impression of WD 1425+540 with a Kuiper Belt analogue, a hypothetical exoplanet and an infalling exocomet Credit: NASA, ESA, and Z. Levy (STScI)

Observation data Epoch J2000 Equinox J2000
- Constellation: Boötes
- Right ascension: 14^{h} 27^{m} 36.17^{s}
- Declination: +53° 48′ 28.00″
- Apparent magnitude (V): 15.0

Characteristics
- Evolutionary stage: white dwarf
- Spectral type: DBAZ4

Astrometry
Radial velocity (R_{v})	33.7 ±7.8 km/s
Proper motion (μ)	RA: -344.789 ±0.026 mas/yr Dec.: 140.017 ±0.027 mas/yr
Parallax (π)	19.4036±0.0235 mas
Distance	168.1 ± 0.2 ly (51.54 ± 0.06 pc)

Details

WD 1425+540
Mass	0.629±0.016 M_{☉}
Radius	0.0122±0.0002 (Note: Derived from known mass and surface gravity of star.) R_{☉}
Surface gravity (log g)	8.067±0.027 cgs
Temperature	14,550±230 K

G200-40
Mass	0.561 ± 0.009 M_{☉}
Radius	0.526 ± 0.007 R_{☉}
Surface gravity (log g)	4.34 ± 0.48 cgs
Temperature	4036 ± 66 K
Metallicity [Fe/H]	−0.63 ± 0.18 dex

Other designations
- G 200-39, EGGR 295, ** GIC 119, GALEX J142735.9+534829, 2MASS J14273615+5348280, NLTT 37443, WD 1425+54

Database references
SIMBAD	data

WD 1425+540 (G200-39) is a white dwarf that accreted an exocomet (exo-Kuiper Belt Object, exo-KBO). This is evident from the pollution of the white dwarf atmosphere with metals, especially the pollution with nitrogen. WD 1425+540 is the first white dwarf with detected nitrogen. The white dwarf has a K-dwarf companion called G200-40, about 40 arcseconds away. The white dwarf nature of the object was discovered by Greenstein in 1974.

The white dwarf is the prototype of the DBA spectral type that indicates both hydrogen and helium in its atmosphere, which was discovered in 1977. Metal pollution was first discovered in 1988 in the form of small amounts of calcium. Observations with Keck and Hubble, published in 2017, showed that the white dwarf is polluted with the elements carbon, nitrogen, oxygen, magnesium, silicon, sulfur, calcium, iron and nickel. The total mass of the heavy elements is around at least 10% of the mass of Pluto. The presence of nitrogen and its high abundance in WD 1425+540 hints at the presence of nitrogen ice or ammonia ice on the surface of the accreted body. The C/O ratio indicates that the body was dominated by magnesium silicates. High abundance of oxygen also shows that the body was rich in water ice, but also had carbon ices (e.g. dry ice, CO ice). The presence of water ice in the accreted body could also explain the high amount of hydrogen in the atmosphere of WD 1425+540. The excess in oxygen indicates that the exo-KBO would have been made of 30% water ice. The total abundance resembles the composition of the comet Halley. A study in 2021 showed that the abundance of the accreted material is in agreement with the metal abundance of the companion star G200-40.

When WD 1425+540 was a main-sequence star, it had a mass of about 2 M_{☉} and therefore the exo-KBO would have been 120 astronomical units from its star, or 3 times the distance of the Kuiper Belt from the sun. When the star lost mass during the asymptotic giant branch stage, the Kuiper-Belt analogue would have expanded to beyond 300 au. Simulations have shown that the pollution might have followed the eccentric Kozai–Lidov mechanism.

== See also ==
- List of exoplanets and planetary debris around white dwarfs
- G238-44 another white dwarf with nitrogen pollution
