= Phi Leonis =

Star in the constellation Leo

φ Leonis
- Location of φ Leonis (circled in red)

Observation data Epoch J2000 Equinox ICRS
- Constellation: Leo
- Right ascension: 11^{h} 16^{m} 39.69960^{s}
- Declination: −03° 39′ 05.7770″
- Apparent magnitude (V): 4.46

Characteristics
- Evolutionary stage: main sequence
- Spectral type: A7 IVn
- U−B color index: +0.10
- B−V color index: +0.22

Astrometry
Radial velocity (R_{v})	−3.0 km/s
Proper motion (μ)	RA: −110.37 mas/yr Dec.: −37.16 mas/yr
Parallax (π)	17.71±0.25 mas
Distance	184 ± 3 ly (56.5 ± 0.8 pc)
Absolute magnitude (M_{V})	0.56

Details
Mass	1.59 M_{☉}
Radius	3.9 R_{☉}
Luminosity	42 L_{☉}
Surface gravity (log g)	3.56 cgs
Temperature	7,680±261 K
Rotational velocity (v sin i)	254 km/s
Age	432 Myr

Other designations
- φ Leo, 74 Leo, BD−02°3315, FK5 1292, HD 98058, HIP 55084, HR 4368, SAO 138102

Database references
SIMBAD	data

Phi Leonis (φ Leo) is a single star in the equatorial-northern constellation Leo, located in the southern celestial hemisphere. It is bright enough to be seen with the naked eye, having an apparent visual magnitude of 4.46. Based upon parallax measurements, the distance to Phi Leo is around 184 light years.

The spectrum of this star fits a stellar classification of A7IVn, which suggests it is an A-type subgiant star that has left the main sequence and is evolving into a giant star. It is being viewed with the plane of the star's equator lying close the line of sight from the Earth, and shows a high rotation rate with a projected rotational velocity of 254 km/s. This rapid spin is giving the star an oblate shape with an equatorial bulge that is 29% larger than the polar radius.

Phi Leonis has been mentioned as a shell star—indicating that there is a circumstellar disk of gas around the star's equator—and may display a slight variability. Sporadic variation of the spectra on the time scale of minutes up to months in duration suggests that solid, cometary bodies are in orbit around the star, with objects approaching close enough for refractory materials to sublimate. Most exocomet hosts do have a circumstellar disk, which can act as an exocomet reservoir. Cold dust around Phi Leonis was not detected, and the star is not associated with a warm debris disk.
