= CE Antliae =

Young star in the constellation Antlia

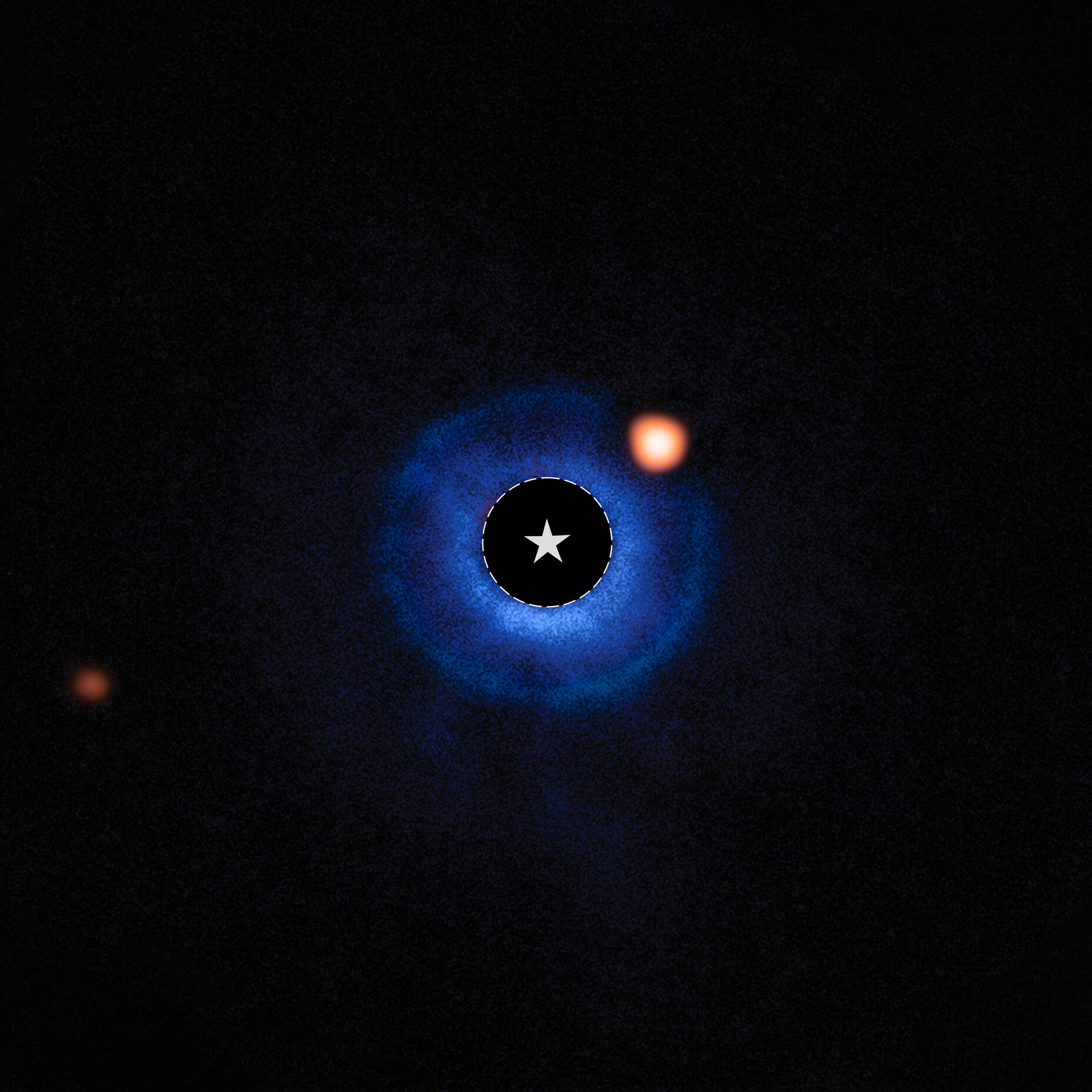
- VLT and MIRI observations of the disk and planet candidate around CE Antliae

Observation data Epoch J2000 Equinox J2000
- Constellation: Antlia
- Right ascension: 10^{h} 42^{m} 30.10^{s}
- Declination: −33° 40′ 16.2″
- Apparent magnitude (V): 10.91±0.07

Characteristics
- Evolutionary stage: T Tauri star
- Spectral type: M1
- Variable type: rotational variable, flare star

Astrometry
Radial velocity (R_{v})	10.81±4.41 km/s
Proper motion (μ)	RA: −118.751(23) mas/yr Dec.: −19.648(26) mas/yr
Parallax (π)	29.3277±0.0273 mas
Distance	111.2 ± 0.1 ly (34.10 ± 0.03 pc)
Absolute magnitude (M_{V})	+9.0

Details
Mass	0.46±0.09 M_{☉}
Radius	0.92±0.12 R_{☉}
Luminosity	0.115±0.019 L_{☉}
Surface gravity (log g)	4.18±0.17 cgs
Temperature	3509±116 K
Rotation	5.012±0.007 days
Rotational velocity (v sin i)	63.2 km/s
Age	6.4±1.1 Myr

Other designations
- TWA 7, CE Ant, TYC 7190-2111-1, ASAS J104230-3340.3, GSC 07190-02111, 2MASS J10423011-3340162, RX J104230.3-334014, TIC 54147487, WISE J104230.01-334016.4, Gaia DR2 5444751795151480320

Database references
SIMBAD	data

CE Antliae (also called TWA 7) is a young low-mass star in the constellation of Antlia. It is surrounded by a debris disk and has one directly imaged planet candidate.

TWA 7 was discovered in 1999 with a spectral type of M1 and as a member of the TW Hydrae association. The detection of molecular hydrogen is interpreted as a weak sign of accretion of gas near the star. A giant x-ray flare was detected on 2010-09-07 with MAXI/GSC on the ISS.

== Planetary system ==
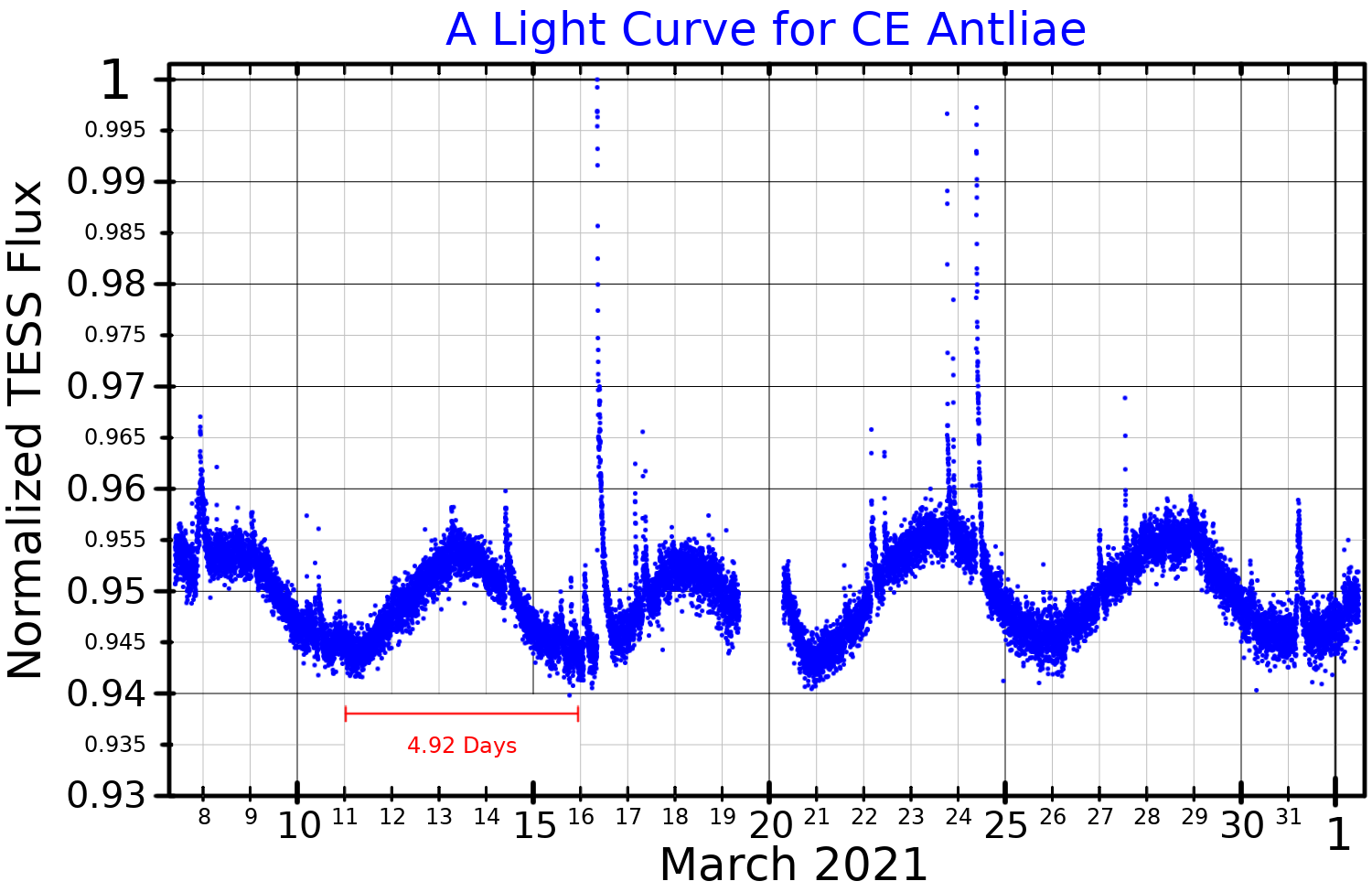
A light curve for CE Antliae, plotted from TESS data. The star's rotation period is marked in red.

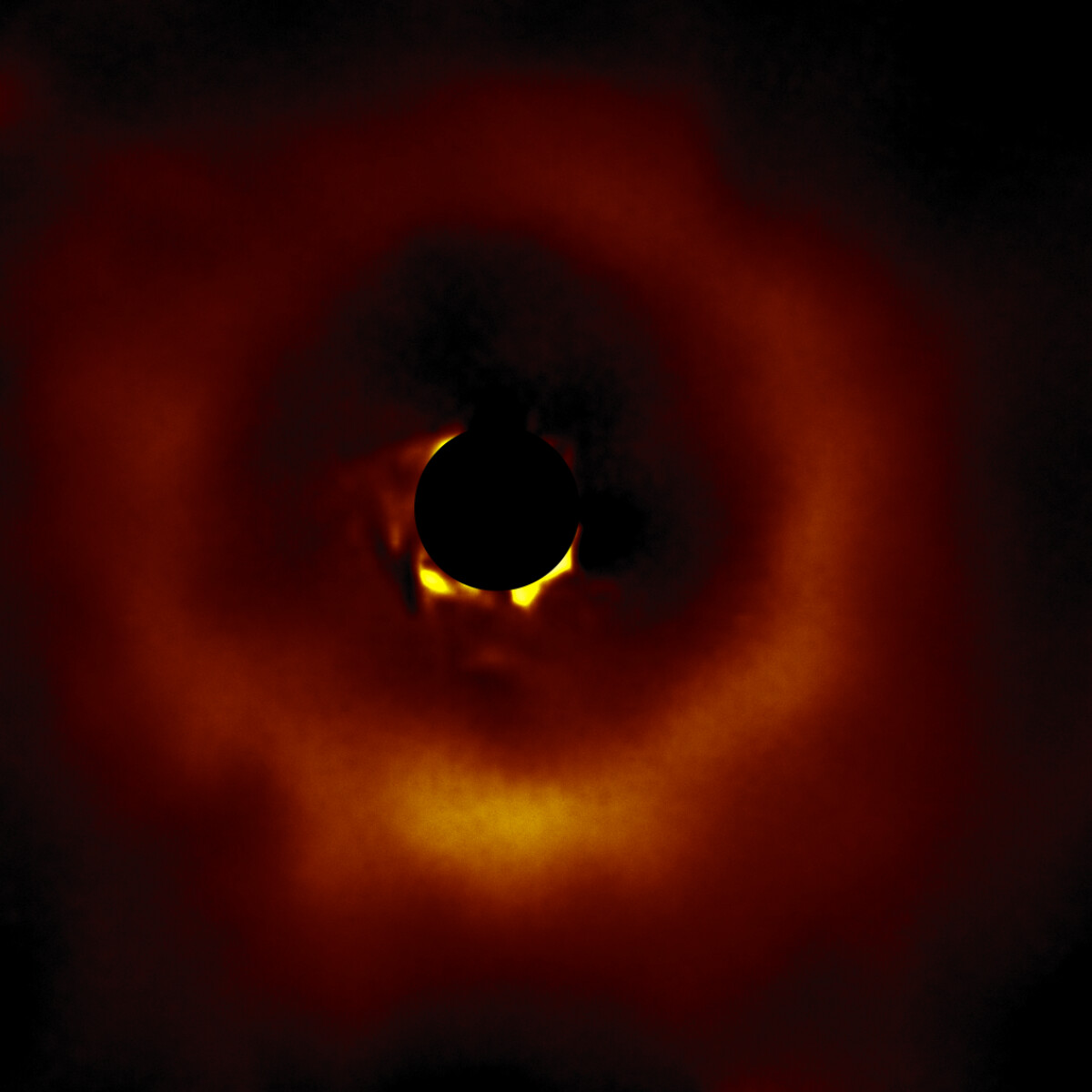
TWA 7 disk with Gemini South telescope

The disk was first imaged in scattered light in 1998 with Hubble NICMOS, but it needed a re-processing in 2016 to reveal the disk. The observation showed a pole-on dust ring with a radius of about 35 astronomical units. An outer ring and a spiral arm originating from the main ring was tentatively detected with VLT/SPHERE in 2018. The modelling also showed evidence of an inner ring. An additional observation with Hubble STIS showed three rings, two spirals and a clump. In 2000 dust was detected around TWA 7 due to excess of submillimeter radiation. ALMA observations did however show that most emission come from a background galaxy. The disk was also detected with ALMA. The disk has detected carbon monoxide (CO) gas according to ALMA observations, which is likely generated by exocomets. It was the first detection of CO gas in a debris disk around an M-dwarf. This kind of detection is more common around more massive stars.

In 2025 JWST MIRI observations showed a point source that could be a young sub-Jovian planet with a mass of 0.3 M_{J} (about 100 M_{🜨}) and a temperature of around 320 K (47 °C). The candidate can explain the main ring of the debris disk. It also does not fit the spectrum of a background star. It could be consistent with an intermediate-redshift star-forming galaxy, but the probability of such a galaxy appearing that close to TWA 7 is estimated to be 0.34%. If confirmed as a planet, it would be the least massive directly imaged exoplanet. The candidate is located in an underdensity in ring 2 that was noticed before. Opposite to the planet candidate is another underdensity region, which could be created by orbital resonance. The mass of the candidate was previously predicted to be 2 Neptune masses (about 34 M_{🜨}) before it was detected.

This candidate planet was independently detected by observations taken with the NIRCam instrument aboard JWST. The observations strongly support a planetary nature for this object, finding a background galaxy to be unlikely. The planet's mass could be similar to Neptune's. A second point-like source was also detected, but it needs follow-up observations to determine its nature.

Another 2025 study aimed to detect close-in planets by searching periodicities in the radial velocity that would be caused by orbiting planets. Their modelling suggests a planet with a minimum mass of 12.5+3.0
−3.3 M_{🜨} and a likely period of 15.21 days, with periods of 20.8 and 30.4 days being less likely. Assuming that the planet is coplanar to the protoplanetary disk, its inclination would be 13° and the true mass would be 0.17+0.04
−0.03 M_{J}. The detection of the planet is considered unclear, as the period may be correlated with the rotation period and the window function, although it is close to the reliable detection limit. Another periodicity of 6.6 days has been detected in some spectral lines, although not in other spectral lines and radial velocities. It might arise may be from star-planet interactions if the supposed planet is orbiting at 20.8 days, or less likely, from the planetary rotation period, although one possibility is that a tidally locked planet is orbiting at that period. The non-detection of the periodicity in the radial velocities imply an upper mass limit of 0.12 M_{J}.

The CE Antliae planetary system
Companion (in order from star)	Mass	Semimajor axis (AU)	Orbital period (years)	Eccentricity	Inclination (°)	Radius
Ring 1	24.49±0.04 AU				—	—
b (candidate)	0.3 M_{J}	52	550	—	—	—
Ring 2	52.38±0.12 AU				—	—
Ring 3	101+2 −3 AU				—	—

== See also ==
- List of directly imaged exoplanets
- List of resolved circumstellar disks

Other M dwarfs with debris disks

- AU Microscopii
- Fomalhaut C
- GSC 07396-00759
