= WD 1337+705 =

Star in the constellation Ursa Minor

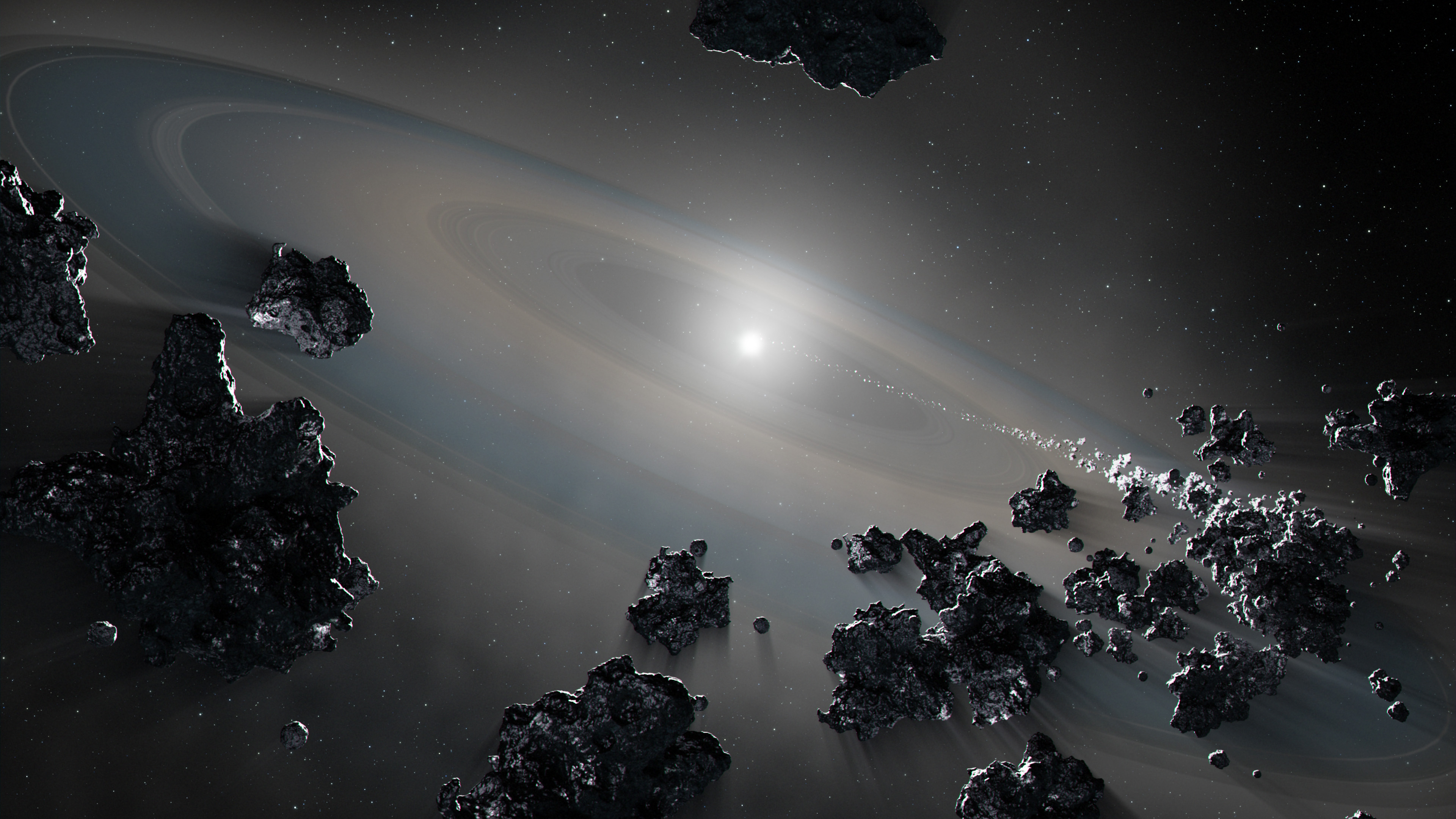
- Artist's Impression of WD 1337+705 accreting both rocky and icy material Credit: NASA, ESA, Joseph Olmsted (STScI)

Observation data Epoch J2000 Equinox ICRS
- Constellation: Ursa Minor
- Right ascension: 13^{h} 38^{m} 50.4781^{s}
- Declination: +70° 17′ 07.641″
- Apparent magnitude (V): 12.773

Characteristics
- Evolutionary stage: white dwarf
- Spectral type: DA2.4

Astrometry
Proper motion (μ)	RA: −402.093±0.078 mas/yr Dec.: −24.608±0.068 mas/yr
Parallax (π)	37.7083±0.0422 mas
Distance	86.49 ± 0.10 ly (26.52 ± 0.03 pc)
Absolute magnitude (M_{V})	10.56

Details
Mass	0.59 M_{☉}
Luminosity	0.03 L_{☉}
Temperature	21,290 K

Other designations
- WD 1337+705, EG 102, HIP 66578, LTT 18341

Database references
SIMBAD	data

WD 1337+705 (G238-44) is a star in the constellation Ursa Minor. Shining with an apparent magnitude of 12.8, it is white dwarf 0.59 times as massive as the Sun. It is 86.5 light-years distant from Earth. It has 3% of the Sun's luminosity.

In 1997, Jay Holberg and colleagues discovered magnesium in its spectrum, which suggests that it has some low mass companion or accretion of material happening as the star's temperature is not hot enough for its intrinsic emission. Despite this, no direct evidence for a circumstellar disc, such as an infrared excess, has come to light.

In 2022 a team of researchers found that the metal-pollution of this white dwarf is unusual. The presence of iron in the atmosphere indicates that an iron-rich minor planet was accreted. This object formed close to the star with a Mercury-like composition. The presence of nitrogen on the other hand shows that an icy Kuiper belt object was accreted as well. This nitrogen is usually stored in ices, such as N_{2} and ammonia. KBOs are also rich in other ices (H_{2}O, CO, CO_{2}) containing carbon and oxygen, which are also present in this white dwarf. Other detected elements are magnesium, aluminium, silicon, phosphorus, sulfur and calcium. The accreted KBO was 7.1 times more massive than the Mercury-like object. The white dwarf formed from a main-sequence star around 50 Myrs ago. Simulations have shown that it is possible for both main-belt asteroids and KBOs to be delivered within the first 100 Myrs.

== See also ==
- List of exoplanets and planetary debris around white dwarfs
- WD 1425+540, the first white dwarf to be found to be polluted with nitrogen
- LSPM J0207+3331 another white dwarf polluted by more than one object
