= Rho Virginis =

Variable A-type main sequence star in the constellation Virgo

ρ Virginis
- Location of ρ Virginis (circled)

Observation data Epoch J2000.0 Equinox ICRS
- Constellation: Virgo
- Right ascension: 12^{h} 41^{m} 53.05658^{s}
- Declination: +10° 14′ 51.1699″
- Apparent magnitude (V): +4.88

Characteristics
- Evolutionary stage: main sequence
- Spectral type: A0 V
- U−B color index: +0.03
- B−V color index: +0.09

Astrometry
Radial velocity (R_{v})	+1.6 km/s
Proper motion (μ)	RA: +82.67 mas/yr Dec.: −89.08 mas/yr
Parallax (π)	27.57±0.21 mas
Distance	118.3 ± 0.9 ly (36.3 ± 0.3 pc)
Absolute magnitude (M_{V})	+1.90±0.28

Details
Mass	2.0 M_{☉}
Radius	1.6 R_{☉}
Luminosity	14 L_{☉}
Surface gravity (log g)	4.36 cgs
Temperature	8,930 K
Metallicity [Fe/H]	−1.00 dex
Rotational velocity (v sin i)	154 km/s

Other designations
- 30 Virginis, BD+11°2485, FK5 1326, HD 110411, HIP 61960, HR 4828, SAO 100211

Database references
SIMBAD	data

Rho Virginis (ρ Vir, ρ Virginis) is the Bayer designation for a star in the constellation Virgo. It has an apparent visual magnitude of +4.9, making it a challenge to view with the naked eye from an urban area (according to the Bortle Dark-Sky Scale). The distance to this star has been measured directly using the parallax method, which places it 118.3 light-years (36.3 parsecs) away with a margin of error of about a light year.

Rho Virginis is an A-type main sequence star with a stellar classification of A0 V. It is larger than the Sun with a radius 60% larger and about twice the mass. As such it is generating energy at a higher rate than the Sun, with a luminosity 14 times greater. The outer atmosphere has an effective temperature of 8,930 K, which is what gives it the white-hued glow of an A-type star. It is classified as a Delta Scuti type variable star and its brightness varies by 0.02 magnitudes over periods of 0.5 to 2.4 hours.

This star has been established as a Lambda Boötis star that displays low abundances of iron peak elements. It displays an excess of infrared emission, but it is unclear whether this is being caused by a circumstellar debris disk or from the star passing through and heating up a diffuse interstellar dust cloud. Most likely it is the former, in which case the dusty disk has a radius of around 37 AU and a mean temperature of 90 K.
