= HD 256 =

Binary star system in the constellation Cetus

Observation data Epoch J2000 Equinox ICRS
- Constellation: Cetus
- Right ascension: 00^{h} 07^{m} 18.26172^{s}
- Declination: −17° 23′ 13.2424″
- Apparent magnitude (V): 6.20

Characteristics
- Spectral type: A3Vn sh
- Apparent magnitude (B): 6.33
- Apparent magnitude (J): 5.858
- Apparent magnitude (H): 5.83
- Apparent magnitude (K): 5.747
- B−V color index: 0.133±0.005

Astrometry
Radial velocity (R_{v})	−10.2±0.9 km/s
Proper motion (μ)	RA: −7.217 mas/yr Dec.: 21.155 mas/yr
Parallax (π)	6.8882±0.1184 mas
Distance	474 ± 8 ly (145 ± 2 pc)
Absolute magnitude (M_{V})	0.01

Orbit
Period (P)	747.6 days
Semi-major axis (a)	3.08 AU
Eccentricity (e)	0.23
Inclination (i)	93.34°

Details

A
Mass	1.94±0.15 M_{☉}
Luminosity	57.3±2.0 L_{☉}
Surface gravity (log g)	3.8±0.1 cgs
Temperature	9,000±100 K
Rotational velocity (v sin i)	294±9 km/s
Age	530±50 Myr

B
Mass	1.62±0.13 M_{☉}
Luminosity	13.7±0.5 L_{☉}
Surface gravity (log g)	4.2±0.1 cgs
Temperature	8,250±100 K
Rotational velocity (v sin i)	200±20 km/s

Other designations
- BD−18°6428, GC 103, HD 256, HIP 602, HR 10, SAO 147090, PPM 208364, 2MASS J00071825-1723132, Gaia DR2 2414558084699665920

Database references
SIMBAD	data

HD 256 is a binary star system in the equatorial constellation of Cetus. It has a white hue and is dimly visible to the naked eye with an apparent visual magnitude of 6.20. Based upon parallax measurements, the system is located at a distance of approximately 474 light years from the Sun. It is drifting closer with a radial velocity of −10 km/s.

Originally considered a single star, it was reported to be a shell star in 1982. Circumstellar absorption lines were then found to be variable, showing a similarity to the edge-on debris disk surrounding Beta Pictoris. The stellar classification of A2 IV/V matched an A-type star near the end of its main sequence lifetime, showing traits of an emerging subgiant star phase.

A 2019 study using PIONIER (VLTI) and 32 years of radial velocity measurements concluded that HD 256 is instead a binary star. The variable component of the spectral lines do not come from exocomets according to this study, but rather from the binarity. Each individual star holds its own circumstellar shell. The pair have an orbital period of 2.05 years, an eccentricity of around 0.23, and a semimajor axis of 3.08 AU. The adjusted classification is of a rapidly rotating main sequence shell star of type A3Vn sh.
