= 51 Ophiuchi =

Star in the constellation Ophiuchus

- Location of 51 Ophiuchi (circled in red)

Observation data Epoch J2000 Equinox ICRS
- Constellation: Ophiuchus
- Right ascension: 17^{h} 31^{m} 24.95413^{s}
- Declination: −23° 57′ 45.5136″
- Apparent magnitude (V): 4.81

Characteristics
- Evolutionary stage: pre-main sequence or giant star
- Spectral type: B9.5IIIe
- U−B color index: −0.06
- B−V color index: +0.00

Astrometry
Radial velocity (R_{v})	−12 km/s
Proper motion (μ)	RA: +5.24 mas/yr Dec.: −25.72 mas/yr
Parallax (π)	8.04±0.24 mas
Distance	410 ± 10 ly (124 ± 4 pc)

Details
Mass	3.3±0.1 M_{☉}
Radius	8.08±0.70 (equatorial); 5.66±0.23 (polar) R_{☉}
Surface gravity (log g)	3.12 cgs
Temperature	9,772 K
Metallicity [Fe/H]	−0.25 dex
Rotational velocity (v sin i)	267±5 km/s
Age	0.3 Myr

Other designations
- c Oph, 51 Oph, CD−23°13412, GC 23320, HD 158643, HIP 85755, HR 6519, SAO 185470

Database references
SIMBAD	data

51 Ophiuchi is a single star located approximately 410 light years away from the Sun in the equatorial constellation of Ophiuchus, northwest of the center of the Milky Way. It is visible to the naked eye as a faint, blue-white point of light with an apparent visual magnitude of 4.81. The star is moving closer to the Earth with a heliocentric radial velocity of –12 km/s.

The star has been assigned spectral types of B9.5IIIe and A0 II-IIIe. It is uncertain if it is a pre-main sequence star on the Herbig Ae/Be stage, or is already an evolved giant Be star, as it presents all the characteristics of a typical Be star but also has circumstellar dust that would otherwise indicate a young star. If the star is not a Be star, it would be notable for being "a rare, nearby example of a young planetary system just entering the last phase of planet formation". 51 Ophiuchi is about 300,000 years old with 3.3 times the mass of the Sun and a polar radius 5.7 times the Sun's radius. It is radiating three times the Sun's luminosity from its photosphere at an effective temperature of 9,772 K. The star is spinning rapidly with a projected rotational velocity of 267 km/s, close to the critical rotation rate.

== Dust and gas disk ==
51 Ophiuchi has a disk of dust and gas that appears to be a young debris disk and is probably a planetary system in the late stages of formation. This system resembles Beta Pictoris, a well known star with a large debris disk, in several ways: spectral type, the presence of an edge-on disk with both gas and dust, and the presence of variable blue-shifted absorption lines suggesting in-falling comets.

The distance to 51 Ophiuchi is much greater than the distance to Beta Pictoris, and its debris disk is relatively compact. As a consequence, the disk around 51 Ophiuchi requires an interferometer to resolve, in contrast to that of Beta Pictoris, which has been observed using visual spectrum imaging. Recent observations of 51 Ophiuchi made with the Keck Interferometer Nuller at the W. M. Keck Observatory show that the disk has two components: a central cloud of large particles (exozodiacal dust) surrounded by a much larger cloud of small silicate particles extending to about 1,000 astronomical units. The inner disk has a radius approximately four times the distance between the sun and the Earth, with a density of around 100,000 times that of the dust in the Solar System.

The spectra taken by 2020 have indicated the circumstellar disc is similar in composition to interstellar medium. The dominant species in atomic numbers are hydrogen, helium, oxygen, nitrogen, silicon and iron. Surprisingly, the disk was found to be strongly depleted of carbon and carbon monoxide.
