= 2 Andromedae =

Binary star system in the constellation Andromeda

- Location of 2 Andromedae (circled)

Observation data Epoch J2000 Equinox ICRS
- Constellation: Andromeda
- Right ascension: 23^{h} 02^{m} 36.38176^{s}
- Declination: +42° 45′ 28.0628″
- Apparent magnitude (V): 5.09 (5.26 + 7.43)

Characteristics

2 And A
- Spectral type: A1V
- U−B color index: +0.10
- B−V color index: +0.08

2 And B
- Spectral type: F1V/F4V
- Variable type: δ Sct?

Astrometry

2 And A
Radial velocity (R_{v})	2.1±2.4 km/s
Proper motion (μ)	RA: 56.38 mas/yr Dec.: −4.47 mas/yr
Parallax (π)	7.74±0.51 mas
Distance	420 ± 30 ly (129 ± 9 pc)
Absolute magnitude (M_{V})	−0.39±0.16

2 And B
Absolute magnitude (M_{V})	1.88±0.16

Orbit
Period (P)	73.997±0.509 yr
Semi-major axis (a)	0.225±0.011″
Eccentricity (e)	0.800±0.056
Inclination (i)	21.7±46.0°
Longitude of the node (Ω)	159.5±2.0°
Periastron epoch (T)	1870.280±0.595
Argument of periastron (ω) (secondary)	356.4±3.0°

Details

2 And A
Mass	2.7±0.1 M_{☉}
Luminosity	130.50 L_{☉}
Surface gravity (log g)	3.40±0.12 cgs
Temperature	8,950±250 K
Rotational velocity (v sin i)	212 km/s
Age	100+309 −88 Myr

2 And B
Mass	1.78±0.06 M_{☉}
Surface gravity (log g)	3.90±0.16 cgs
Temperature	7,720±250 K

Other designations
- 2 And, BD+41°4665, GJ 886.1, HD 217782, HIP 113788, HR 8766, SAO 52623, PPM 63742, WDS 23026+4245

Database references
SIMBAD	2 And
- 2 And A
- 2 And B

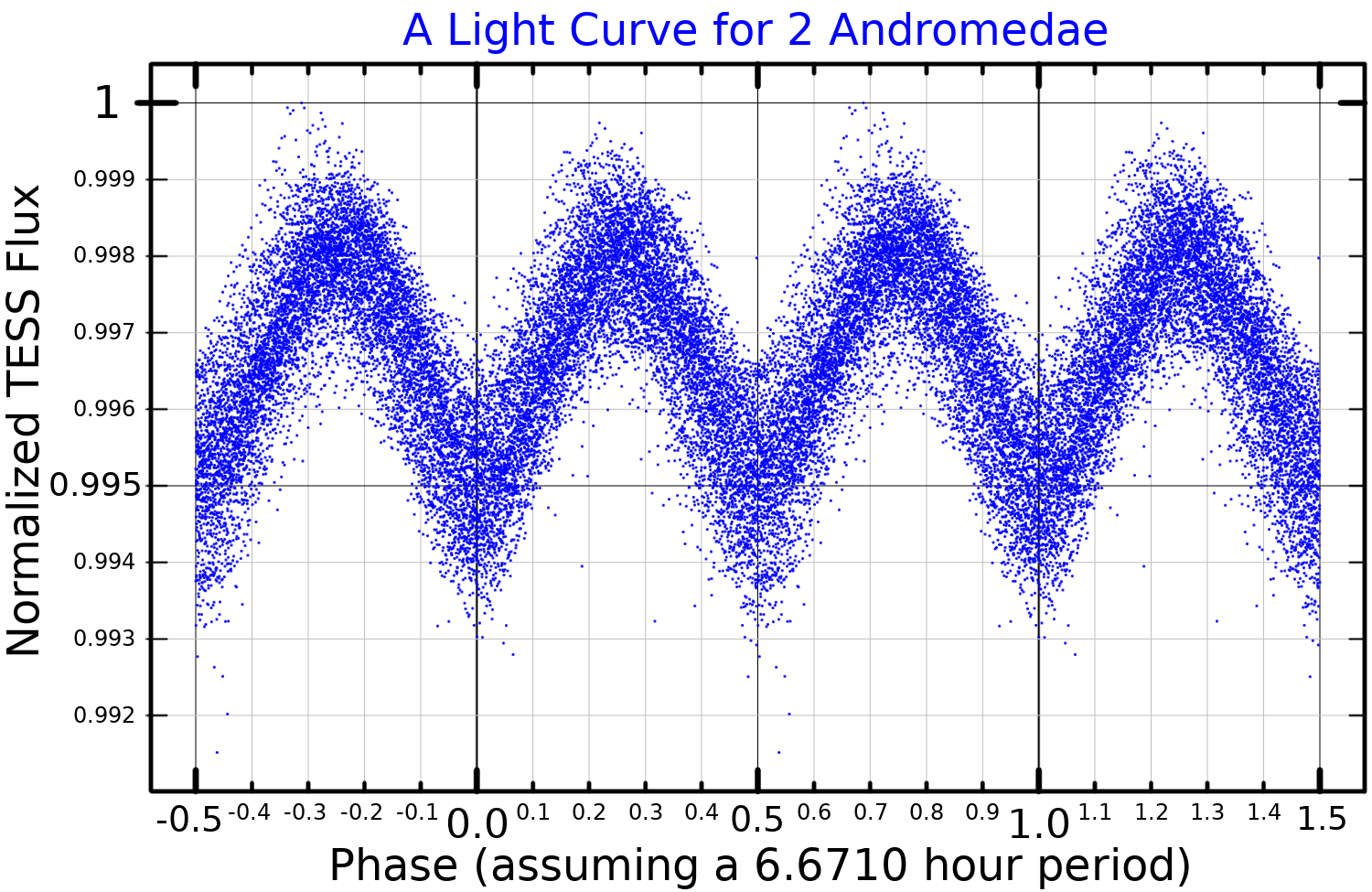
A light curve for 2 Andromedae, plotted from TESS data

2 Andromedae, abbreviated 2 And, is a binary star system in the northern constellation of Andromeda. 2 Andromedae is the Flamsteed designation. It is a faint star system but visible to the naked eye with a combined apparent visual magnitude of 5.09. Based upon an annual parallax shift of 7.7 mas, it is located 420 light years away. The binary nature of the star was discovered by American astronomer Sherburne Wesley Burnham at Lick Observatory in 1889. The pair orbit each other over a period of 74 years with a high eccentricity of 0.8.

The magnitude 5.26 primary, designated component A, is an A-type main-sequence star based on a stellar classification of A1V or A2V, although it may have already left the main sequence. It was identified as a candidate Lambda Boötis star, but this was ruled out by Paunzen et al. (2003) as it doesn't match the typical characteristics of these objects. Although 2 Andromedae does not display a significant infrared excess, it is a shell star that displays varying absorption features due to circumstellar dust grains. This may indicate it has an orbiting debris disk containing gas that is being viewed edge-on. The star is about 100 million years old and is spinning rapidly with a projected rotational velocity of 212 km/s.

The magnitude 7.43 secondary companion, component B, is a suspected variable star and may be a Delta Scuti variable. Alternatively, it may be an ellipsoidal variable with a brown dwarf companion. It is an F-type main-sequence star with a class of F1V/F4.
