= 49 Ceti =

Star in the constellation Cetus

- Location of 49 Ceti (circled)

Observation data Epoch J2000 Equinox ICRS
- Constellation: Cetus
- Right ascension: 01^{h} 34^{m} 37.77868^{s}
- Declination: −15° 40′ 34.8987″
- Apparent magnitude (V): 5.607

Characteristics
- Evolutionary stage: main sequence
- Spectral type: A1V
- U−B color index: +0.05
- B−V color index: +0.07

Astrometry
Radial velocity (R_{v})	+10.30±0.7 km/s
Proper motion (μ)	RA: +94.351 mas/yr Dec.: −3.130 mas/yr
Parallax (π)	17.4725±0.547 mas
Distance	187 ± 6 ly (57 ± 2 pc)
Absolute magnitude (M_{V})	+1.75

Details
Mass	1.96±0.04 M_{☉}
Radius	1.711±0.007 R_{☉}
Luminosity	19.12 L_{☉}
Surface gravity (log g)	4.30±0.15 cgs
Temperature	8,970±100 K
Metallicity [Fe/H]	0.10 dex
Rotational velocity (v sin i)	196.9±2.1 km/s
Age	40 Myr

Other designations
- BD−16°265, HD 9672, HIP 7345, HR 451, SAO 147886

Database references
SIMBAD	data

49 Ceti is a single star in the equatorial constellation of Cetus. It is visible to the naked eye as a dim, white-hued star with an apparent visual magnitude of 5.607. The star is located 187 light-years (57 parsecs) away from the Solar System, based on its parallax, and is drifting further away with a radial velocity of +10 km/s. 49 Ceti has been identified as a member of the 40-million-year-old Argus Association.

This is a young A-type main-sequence star with a stellar classification of A1V. It is about 40 million years old with a high rate of spin, showing a projected rotational velocity of 196 km/s. The star has 1.96 times the mass of the Sun and 1.71 times the radius of the Sun. It is radiating 19 times the Sun's luminosity from its photosphere at an effective temperature of 8,790 K.

49 Ceti displays a significant infrared excess, which is a characteristic of a debris disk orbiting the star. Unusually, the disk seems to be gas-rich, with evidence of carbon monoxide (CO) gas. This carbon monoxide gas may possibly be from comets orbiting the star within the disk, similar to the Kuiper Belt in the Solar System.
