= NGC 896 =

Star-forming region in the constellation Cassiopeia

Nebula
- H II region
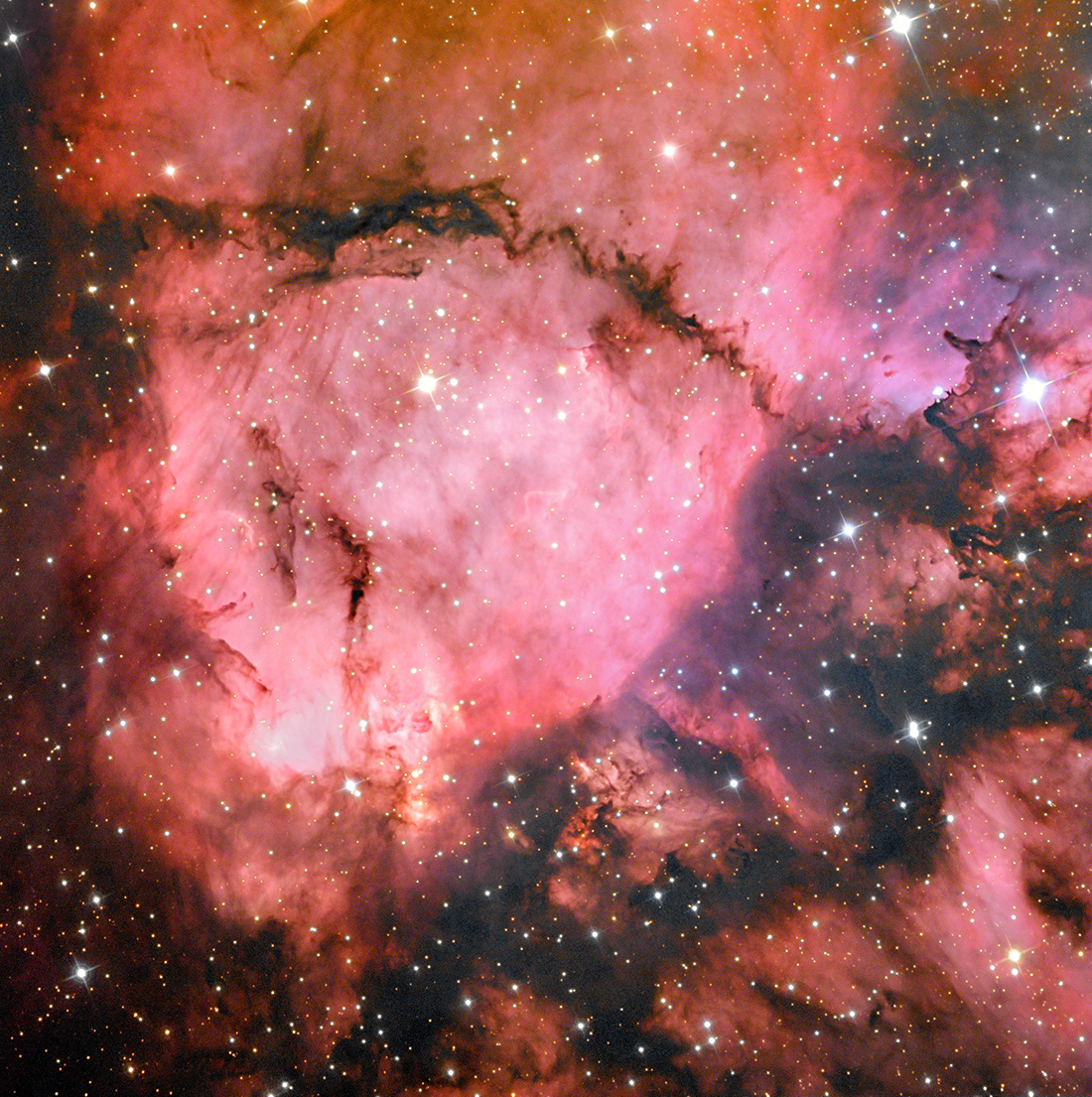
- NGC 896 imaged by Adam Block from Mount Lemmon Observatory

Observation data: J2000.0 epoch
- Right ascension: 02^{h} 27^{m} 4.1^{s}
- Declination: 61° 52′ 22″
- Distance: 7,000 ly (2,100 pc)
- Constellation: Cassiopeia
- Designations: NGC 896, W3

NGC 896 (also known as Westerhout 3) is a giant molecular cloud and a star-forming region in the Perseus Arm of the Milky Way Galaxy, first identified by the Dutch Astronmer Gart Westerhout. It is one of the most active sites of massive star formation in the outer parts of our galaxy, located in the constellation Cassiopeia at a distance of approximately 6,000 light-years from Earth. W3, with W4 and W5, forms part of the larger W3/W4/W5 complex, associated with the Heart and Soul Nebula, and corresponds specifically to the bright emission nebula Fish Head Nebula (IC 1795) within the Heart Nebula (Sh 2-190).

== Structure ==
NGC 896 and the nearby Fish Head Nebula with which NGC 896 is directly connected are located within the W3 nebula complex. which has a shell-like shape and emits visible light. This nebula complex is made up of several sections, catalogued as W3 North, W3 Main and W3(OH), whose combined mass is approximately 70000 M_{☉}. W3 North comprises the northernmost section of the cloud, W3 Main coincides with the brightest part to the west and W3(OH) is the dark region located just southeast of W3 Main.

== Star formation ==
W3 is a prolific star-forming region, hosting both massive O and B-type stars and lower-mass pre-main-sequence (PMS) stars in embedded clusters. Star formation appears to occur sequentially, triggered by feedback from previous generations of massive stars, including expanding ionization bubbles and stellar winds that compress surrounding gas. Ultracompact H II regions, protostellar outflows, and young stellar objects (YSOs) with circumstellar disks are common, as observed by telescopes like Chandra and Spitzer. The region exemplifies how massive stars accrete material in dense environments despite radiative feedback, with detections of large organic molecules like methanol in vast clouds.

== Subregion ==
Westerhout 3 Comprises several distinct subregions, each with unique star-forming characteristics, often studied via multi-wavelength data to map embedded clusters, H II regions, and molecular outflows. These include W3 Main, W3(OH), and others such as W3 East and W3 West, illustrating dynamic interactions within the GMC.

- W3 Main: W3 Main is the central subregion, spanning about 7 parsecs and containing a nearly spherical cluster of around 900 X-ray-detected stars, including ultracompact H II regions and high-mass protostars. It features dense cores, filaments, and a southern cavity likely formed by stellar feedback. Intense star formation involves O-type stars and PMS objects, with infrared excesses indicating disks. Herschel observations highlight warmer, heated material in this area.

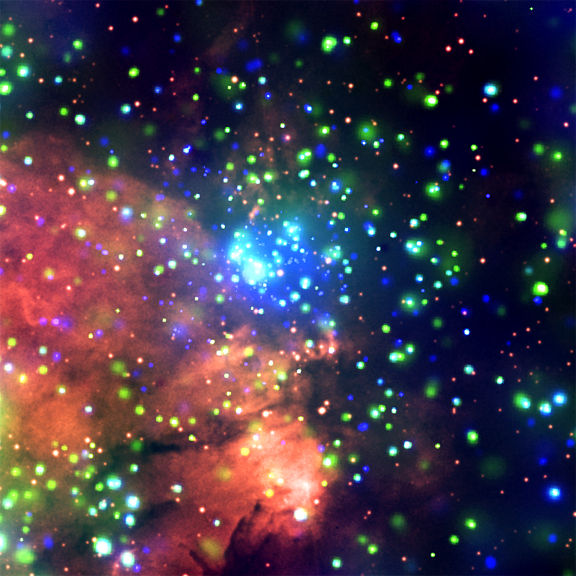
Image of W3 Main

- W3(OH): Located east of W3 Main, W3(OH) is a compact H II region known for OH and Methanol maser emissions, signaling early high-mass star formation. It exhibits an optically thick spectrum below 15 GHz, with embedded cores, outflows, and hot gas. Protostellar clusters form here, potentially triggered by cloud collisions involving three overlapping molecular clouds. Additional star-forming sites lie south of W3(OH), contributing to the HDL's diversity. It is one of W3's most luminous compact sources, as per Herschel and JCMT data.
- Other subregions includes W3 East and W3 West with full widths at half maximum under 0.45 parsecs, showing high densities and protostellar activity akin to the main areas. They exemplify sequential star formation driven by expanding bubbles from prior stellar generations.

== Observation and research ==
W3 has been extensively observed across wavelengths to study its kinematics, gas properties, and stellar populations. Key instruments include the Herschel Space Observatory for far-infrared imaging, the Chandra X-ray Observatory for stellar clusters, and the Spitzer Space Telescope for infrared excesses in YSOs. Research focuses on the interplay between stellar feedback and cloud evolution, making W3 a model for obscured star formation processes.

== Gallery ==
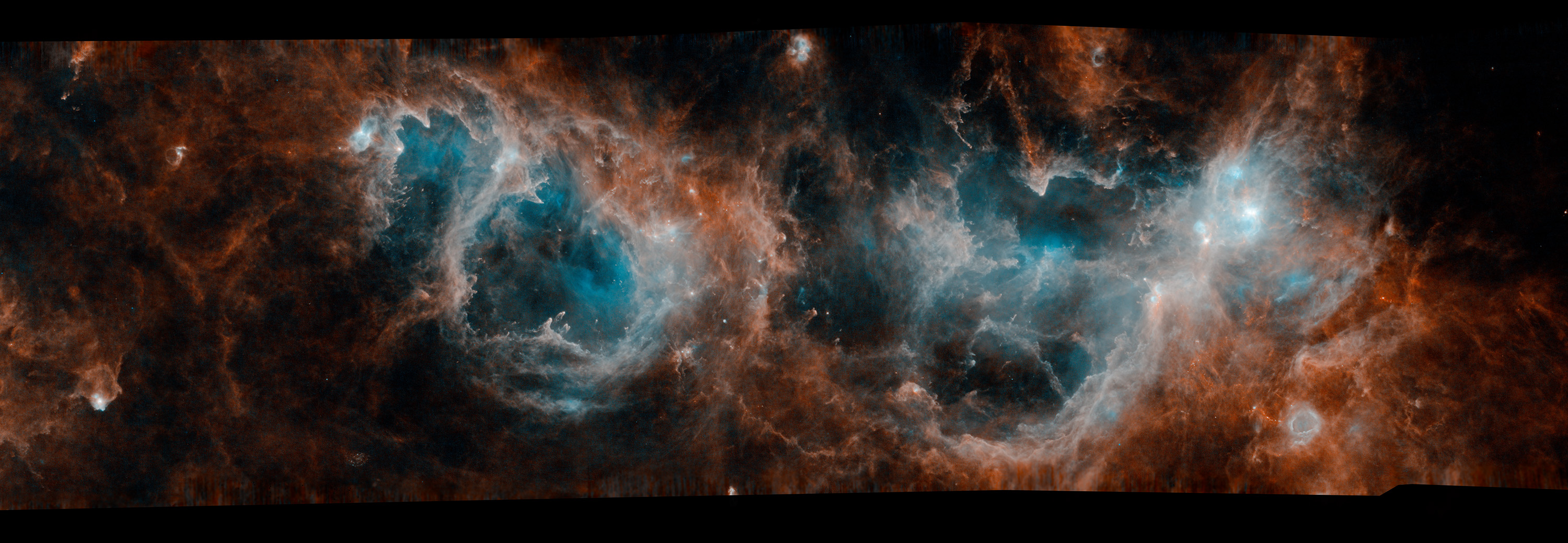
Herschel image of the W3/W4/W5 complex in infrared light
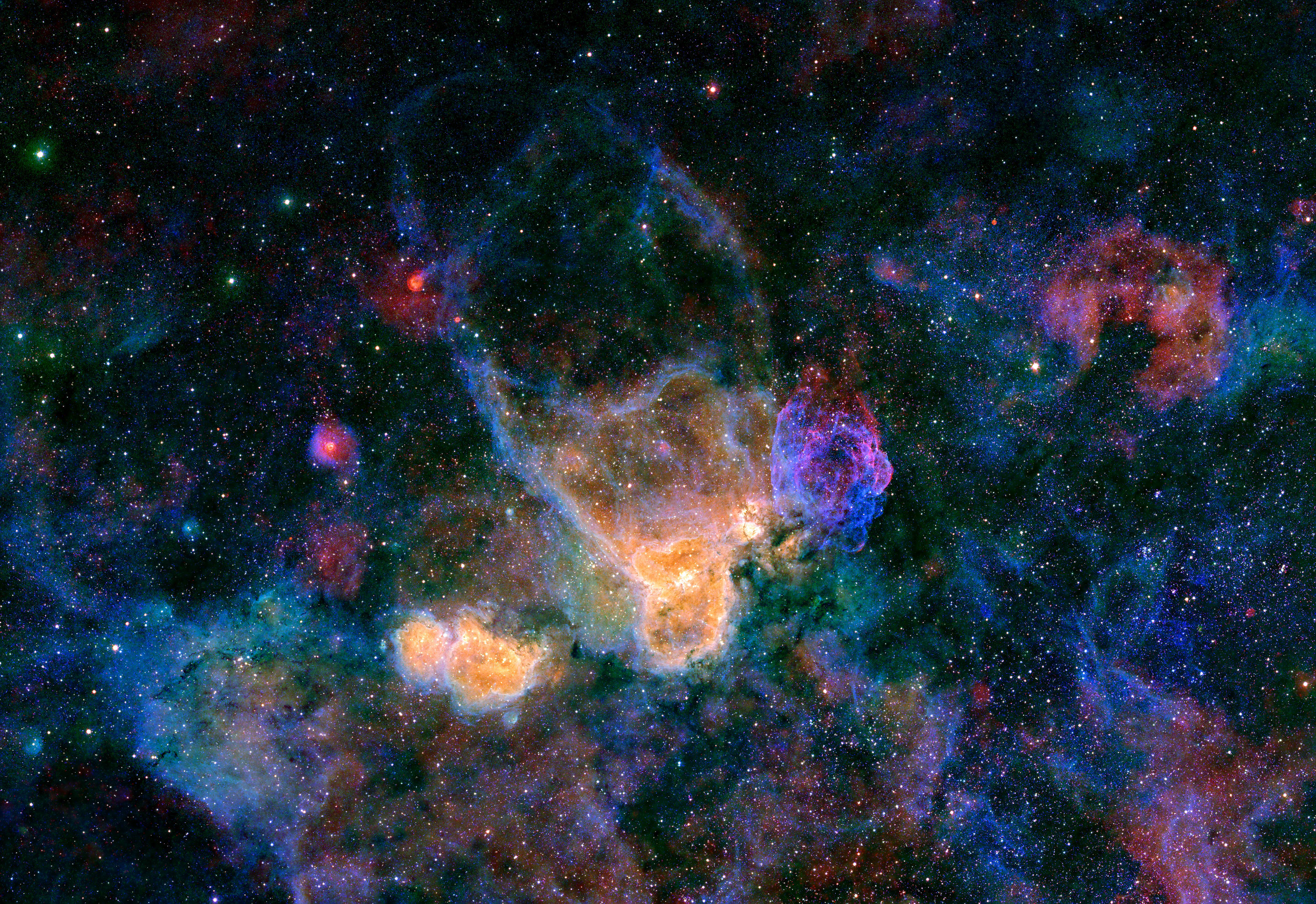
W3/W4/W4 complex in emission lines, as seen by the Northern Sky Narrowband Survey
