= Heart and Soul Nebula =

Star-forming region in Cassiopeia

Molecular cloud
- Giant molecular cloud
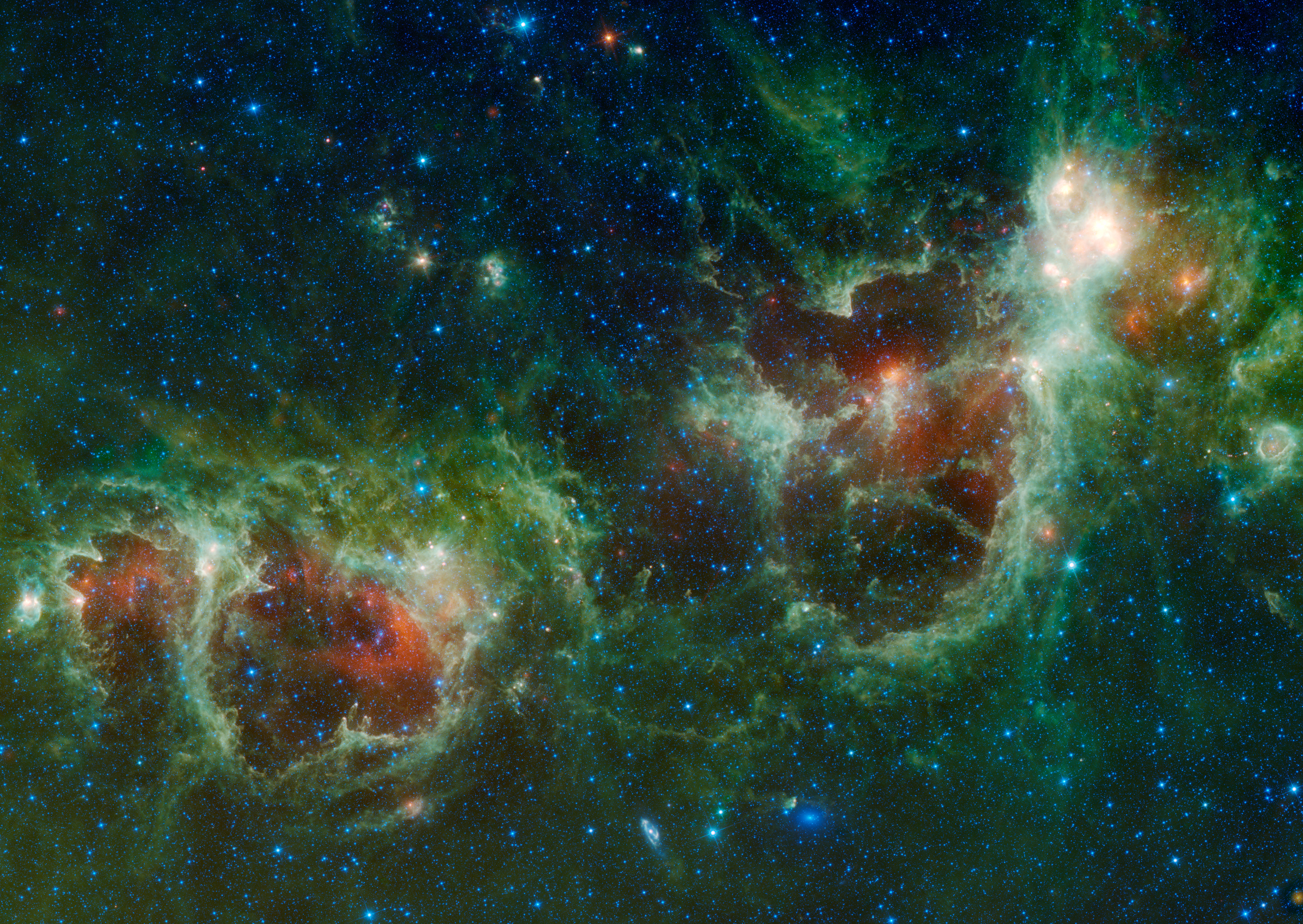
- Heart and Soul Nebula imaged by WISE

Observation data: J2000.0 epoch
- Right ascension: 02^{h} 33^{m} 22^{s}
- Declination: +61° 26′ 36″
- Distance: 6800 ly
- Constellation: Cassiopeia
- Designations: NGC 896/W3, IC 1805/W4, IC 1848/W5

The Heart and Soul Nebula (also known as the W3/W4/W5 Complex) is a large nebula complex, visible in the direction of the constellation Cassiopeia, in which intense star formation takes place. Its physical location within the Milky Way falls in the Perseus Arm, one of the main arms of our Galaxy, about 6,800 light-years from Earth.

Despite its great distance, its observation and study are facilitated by the fact that there is no obscuration due to dark nebulae in the line of sight, thus making it particularly simple and effective to determine a large number of structures, from clusters of high-mass stars to those of low mass and sources well enveloped in nebulosity. Thanks to this ease of observation it is also possible to study the relationships between high-mass stars and the surrounding interstellar medium, the present star formation processes and even the traces of past phenomena, thus allowing us to trace evolutionary models for large molecular nebular complexes. Furthermore, thanks to its overall vision it is possible to study large structures such as superbubbles and their dynamics, as well as easily determine the thickness of the Perseus Arm at the point where the complex is located.

The most studied region of the complex is the one called W3, where the most intense formation processes take place. After the Orion Nebula, W3 is the most studied nebula in the celestial vault, in particular since the 1980s.

== Observation ==
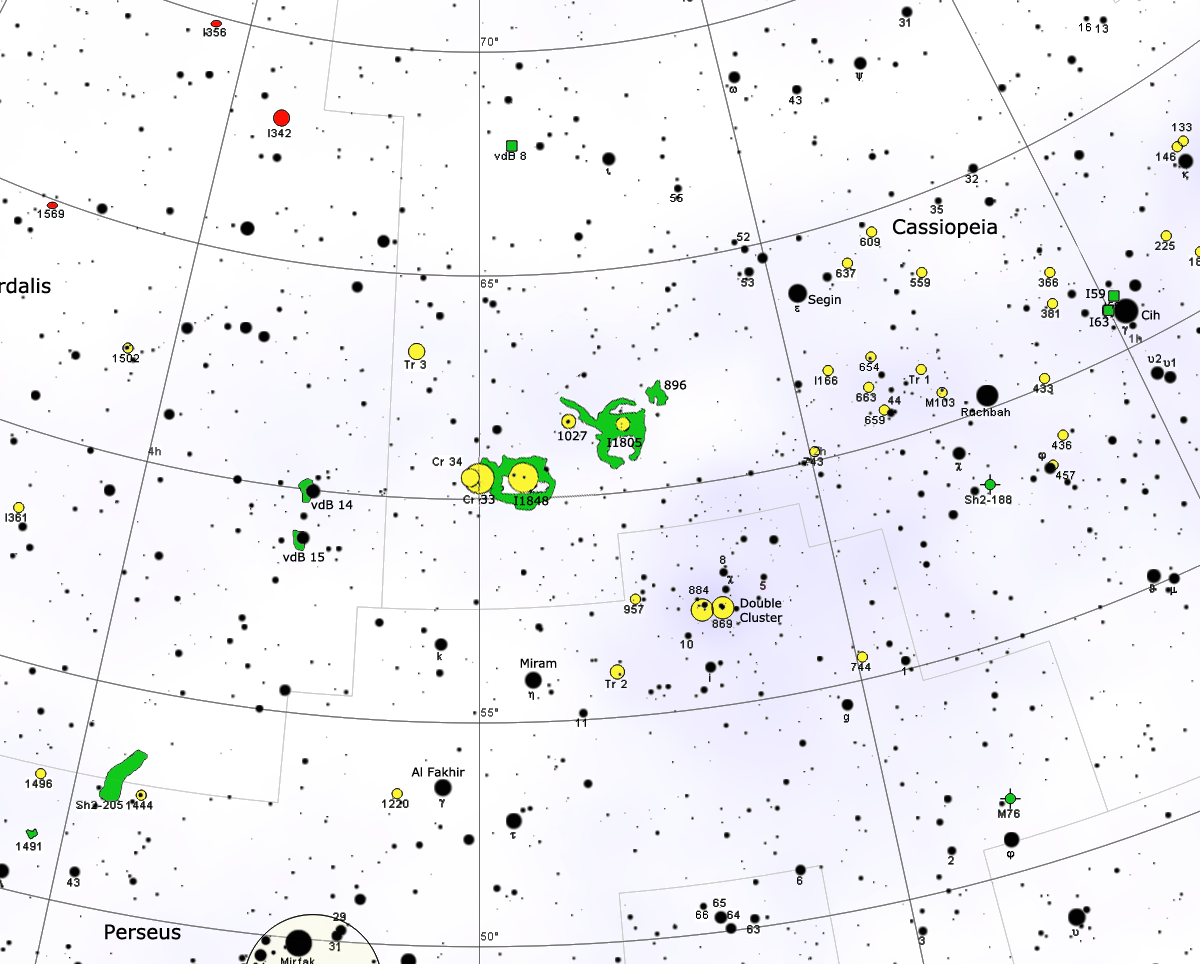
Map of Heart and Soul Nebula

The region of the Heart and Soul Nebula is located in the direction of one of the northernmost reaches of the Milky Way, very deep in the Northern Hemisphere, in the constellation of Cassiopeia. The two main clouds are not observable either with the naked eye or with the aid of binoculars. To be able to identify them optically, instruments with magnifications greater than 100 and a very clear and dark sky are needed. A UHC filter allows to obtain a greater contrast, with which it is also possible to see the filamentary structures hosted in both nebulae. Their position is about 5° north of the famous Double Cluster in Perseus.

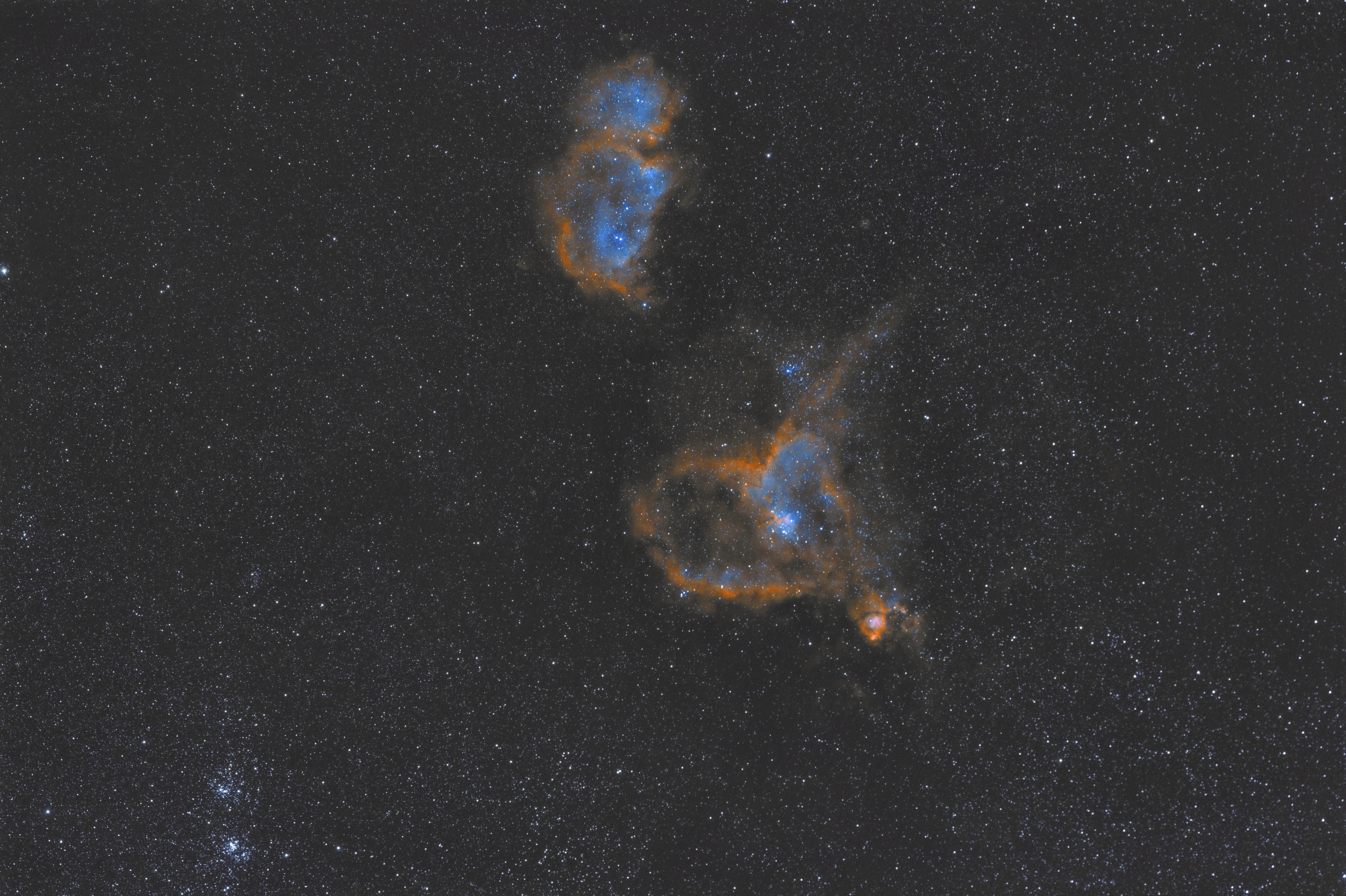
Heart and Soul Nebula and nearby Double Cluster of Perseus

== Structures ==
=== Westerhout 3 ===
Region W3, also catalogued as NGC 896, is the smallest and westernmost region of the system; it is a nebulous complex made up of several sections, catalogued as W3 North, W3 Main and W3(OH), whose combined mass is equivalent to about 70,000 M ☉. W3 North comprises the northernmost section of the cloud, W3 Main coincides with the brightest part located to the west and W3(OH) is the dark region located slightly southeast of W3 Main. The entire complex has a shell shape, inside which are the clouds NGC 896 and IC 1795, which emit visible light.

Image of Westerhout 3 Nebula

NGC 896 is one of the brightest nebular clumps, located in the western sector of the cloud, but it does not show any well-defined concentrations of stars. IC 1795, on the contrary, is surrounded on its northern and southern sides by associations of young stars, belonging to the W3 Main and W3(OH) sectors respectively. The dominant central star of IC 1795 is a blue dwarf on the main sequence, catalogued as BD +61°411, with an apparent magnitude of 10.28 and a spectral type of O6.5V. In addition to this there are three other stars of class O and B. Their age, calculated through stellar evolutionary models after having determined their position in the HR diagram, is between 3 and 5 million years, an intermediate age between the 6-20 million years of the shell structure that encloses the complex and 1 million years, which is the age of the youngest stars still shrouded in the nebulosity of the compact regions W3 North, Main and (OH).

The W3 Main region, in particular, is one of the most studied sites of massive star formation after Orion; it is one of the densest and richest areas of H II regions within a radius of 2000 parsecs from the Sun, which host and hide a young association of blue stars, which ionize the residual gas clouds with their radiation. Several distinct regions can be distinguished, all catalogued with uppercase Latin letters: W3H, W3J and W3K are dispersed regions, W3A, W3B and W3D are compact regions and W3C, W3E, W3F and W3G are ultracompact regions, in addition to these, there are eight hypercompact regions, with an actual diameter of about 0.01 pc, visually equivalent to less than 1 arcsecond. Images taken at various wavelengths, such as visible, Hα and other wavelengths, show the presence of an emission jet coming from W3 Main which appears to emerge from the molecular cloud surrounding it. The exciting stars of these minor regions have been largely identified through observations carried out at various wavelengths, including radio waves: they are class O stars.

=== Westerhout 4 (Heart Nebula) ===
W4, also known as the Heart Nebula due to its two-lobed shape, also has a shell-like structure and is the largest of the three main nebulae of the complex; at its center is the open cluster IC 1805, a designation sometimes also used for the entire nebula associated with it. In fact, IC 1805 forms the central part of the large Cassiopeia OB6 association; the brightest stars in the cluster are blue dwarfs, 24 of which have a mass greater than 10 M ☉, with an age between 1 and 3 million years. Among these blue stars there are 9 of spectral class O, enclosed within a radius of about 10 pc, while the total radius of the open cluster is about 18 pc. Of these O-class stars, studies of the radial velocity and the Gaussian curve have revealed that 6 are double stars, Among these there is one, HD 15558, which appears to be a triple star.

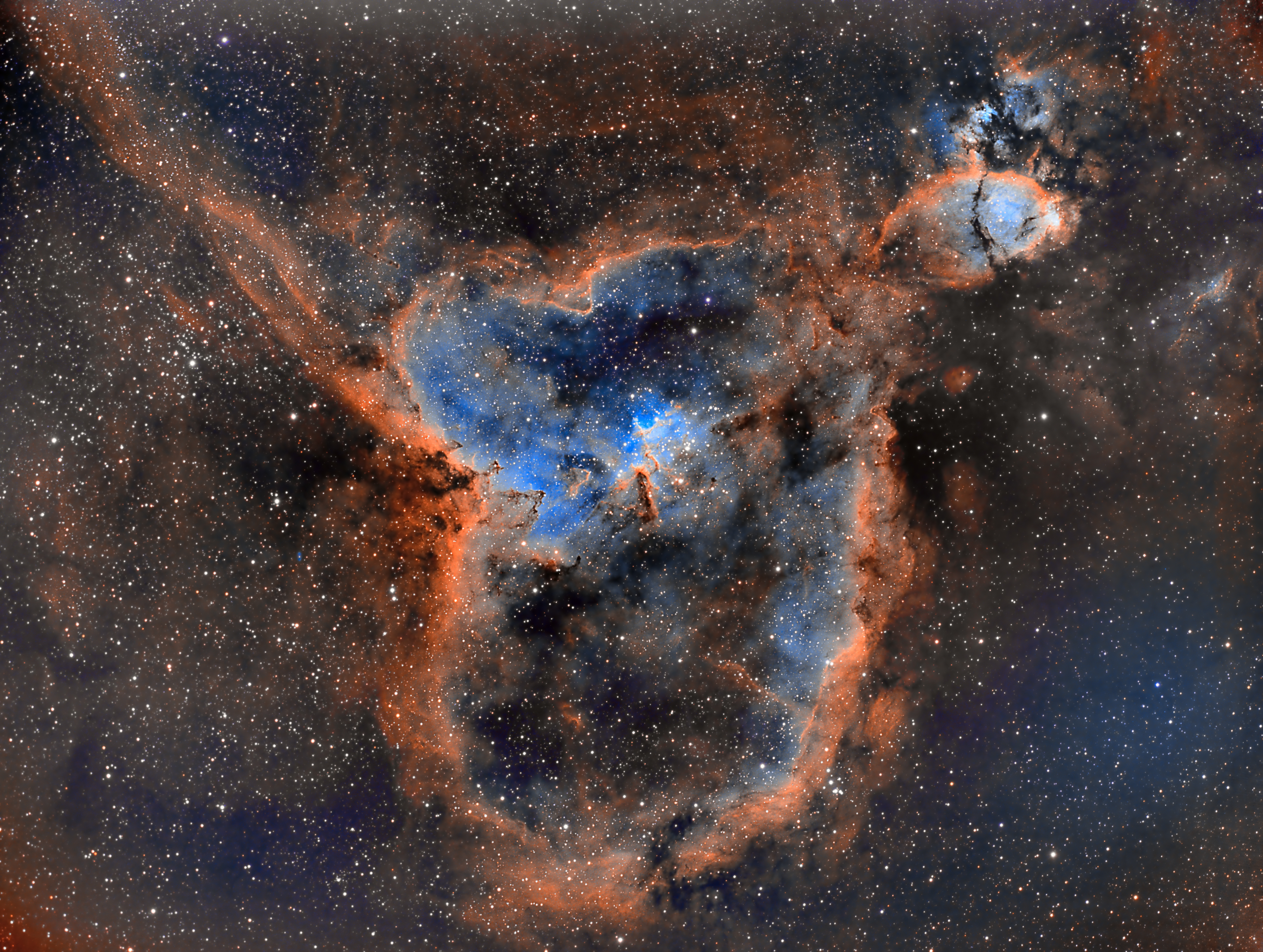
Image of Heart Nebula

Multiple episodes of star formation are active in the vicinity of the nebula, through images obtained in Hα, an expanding superbubble of ionized hydrogen of 1200 pc in size and emerging from the galactic plane has been discovered, whose age, about 10-20 million years, is an indicator of the fact that it originated following the action of the stellar wind of a first generation of massive stars. From this region emerge over 30 molecular clouds and globules dispersed in the surrounding space, as seen above, whose presence suggests that a giant molecular cloud once existed in the region, which later dissolved due to an intense first episode of star formation.

=== Westerhout 5 (Soul Nebula) ===
W5, also known as the Soul Nebula or Embryo Nebula due to its appearance, appears in visible light as a cloud physically separate from the W3-W4 complex, it has an elongated east-west shape and contains within it the association of OB stars catalogued as IC 1848. The cloud, which structurally has a shell shape like the previous ones, can be divided into two sections, designated W5-E and W5-W, extending for 35 and 52 pc respectively. W5-E is the eastern section and contains a class O7V star (a very hot blue dwarf), BD+59°0578, whose stellar wind appears to be powerful enough to ionize the entire region in which it is located; W5-W, the western section, contains four class O stars, but there may also be others in the eastern part of the region, not observable because they are completely hidden by the dense clouds. At least two of these stars are actually star systems: BD+59° 553 is a triple star, while BD+59° 552 is a quad star system. The intersection point between the two parts of the system bears the designation IC 1871.

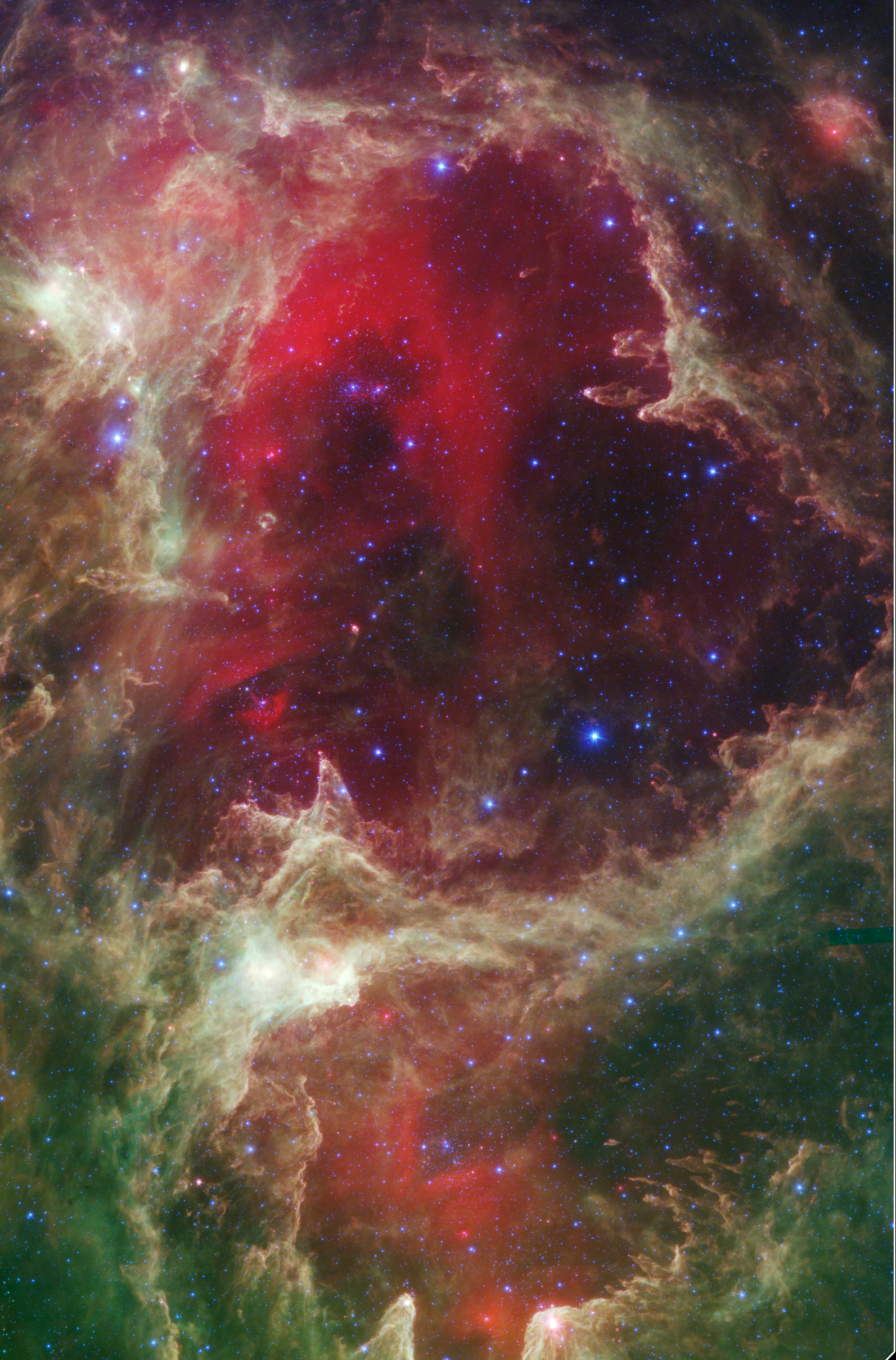
Image of Soul Nebula

The distribution of young stellar objects, however, is concentrated in particular at 5 pc within the edge of the ionized gas shell; the time scale of about 0.5–1 million years, derived from the interaction between the expanding H II region and the clumps in which the young stellar objects are found, suggests that it was the expansion of the ionized gas region itself that favored the formation of new stars.

== Star formation ==
The W3 region is the site of the most important star formation phenomena, which were probably induced by an ionization front coming from the adjacent Heart Nebula region (W4). According to this theory, the first site of star formation in W3 would have been in W3 Main, which in turn triggered the formation in W3(OH) and W3 North.

In 2005, it was observed that the W3 and W4 regions showed signs of consecutive star formation events; the initiating event occurred in the Heart Nebula (W4) approximately 6–10 million years ago and was highly energetic, as evidenced by the presence of an expanding superbubble extending significantly northward. Subsequently, approximately 2.5 million years ago, the second formation event took place, responsible for the formation of the current superbubble; all of these events, together with the stellar wind from the more massive newborn stars, their ultraviolet radiation, and subsequent supernova explosions, would have triggered star formation in the W3 region, sometime between 3 and 5 million years ago. The W3 nebula itself would have formed following these events, which also marked the third wave of star formation, which is still ongoing. However, doubts remain about the nature of the scenario itself in which the phenomena took place, due to the conflicting data provided by Chandra.

On the edges of the expanding W4 superbubble and within W4 itself, residual phenomena of new star formation could still be active, caused by the compression of the gases of the ionization front originating from the most massive stars in the region. Among these is the IRAS source catalogued as IRAS 02310+6133, plus some young stars showing Hα emissions. Another site of probable star formation coincides with a small cloud located to the southeast of the superbubble, in which the source IRAS 02327+6019 is located, the cloud could have been affected by the compression of the ionization front coming from the cluster IC 1805. A similar argument is valid for IRAS 02252+6120 and for other low-mass clouds that could give rise to objects of very low mass, such as brown dwarfs or even smaller objects, with a mass equal to that of a planet.

In the W5 nebula, five sites are known where star formation has occurred, of which only one is actually located inside the nebula complex These phenomena are caused by the action of the cluster IC 1848, located at the centre of the complex. Within several clouds located in the two sections W5-W and W5-E there are groups of stars with Hα emissions, among which the cloud AFGL 4029 stands out. Finally, the distribution of the star formation regions in W5 differs from that observed in W3: in fact, while in W3 the young open clusters and the protostars of great mass are found behind the cloud. In W5 the formation of new stars has occurred mainly on the side of the clouds directly exposed to the observable ultraviolet radiation.

=== Star formation in W3 Main and W3(OH) ===
Star formation phenomena in W3 are indicated by the presence of a large number of infrared sources, which show several features typical of the presence of such phenomena, such as the OH masers associated with the sources catalogued as IRS 4 and IRS 5, the water maser associated with IRS 5 and the bipolar jets around both sources. IRS 4 and IRS 5 are very luminous compact infrared sources; the former is associated with the ultracompact H II region catalogued as W3 C and the hypercompact region W3 Ca, a subregion of the former, while the latter appears in relation to the hypercompact region W3 M.

IRS 5 is the region where the formation of massive stars seems to be most active: two sources of radio waves have been known within it since the 1980s, coinciding with the two hypercompact H II regions W3B and W3D2 with a radius of less than 240 AU and containing young stars within them. To these two sources, very close to each other, a third one is added, discovered in 2005, which also shows signs of the presence of stars wrapped in the dense nebulosity of a hypercompact H II region: this set of H II regions, together with four others detected in observations at 2.22 μm and included in a space with a diameter of 6000 AU, would suggest the formation of a group of massive stars with characteristics similar to the well-known Trapezium group in the Orion Nebula.

Star formation phenomena are less active in W3(OH) than in W3 Main; however, masers are known within it, which indicate the presence of formation activity in very recent times. The region is resolvable into two massive star-forming centers, separated by 7" from each other, equivalent to 0.07 pc; one of these is dominated by OH masers and has given its name to the entire region W3(OH), while the second appears to be dominated by water masers. In the region dominated by OH masers there is an ultracompact H II region with a shell shape and a diameter of only 0.012 pc, whose characteristics suggest that the ionization source is a star of spectral class O7. This star could coincide with the strong X-ray source discovered in 2008, coming from one of the densest sectors of the region. The dynamics of the region are among the best known and studied; from these dynamics a kinematic age of the shell structure of about 2300 years has been established. However, its expansion does not appear to be uniform.

The region of water masers instead seems to be an initial stage in the formation of massive stars: in fact, in this sector there is no H II region, i.e. a bank of gas ionized by the radiation of the associated young stars, but sources that show the presence of very compact and hot molecular gas. In the densest part of the region there are massive protostars.

Regions W4 and W5, compared to W3, are very little studied from the point of view of star formation phenomena, especially for high-mass stars.
