= HD 15558 =

Star in the constellation Cassiopeia

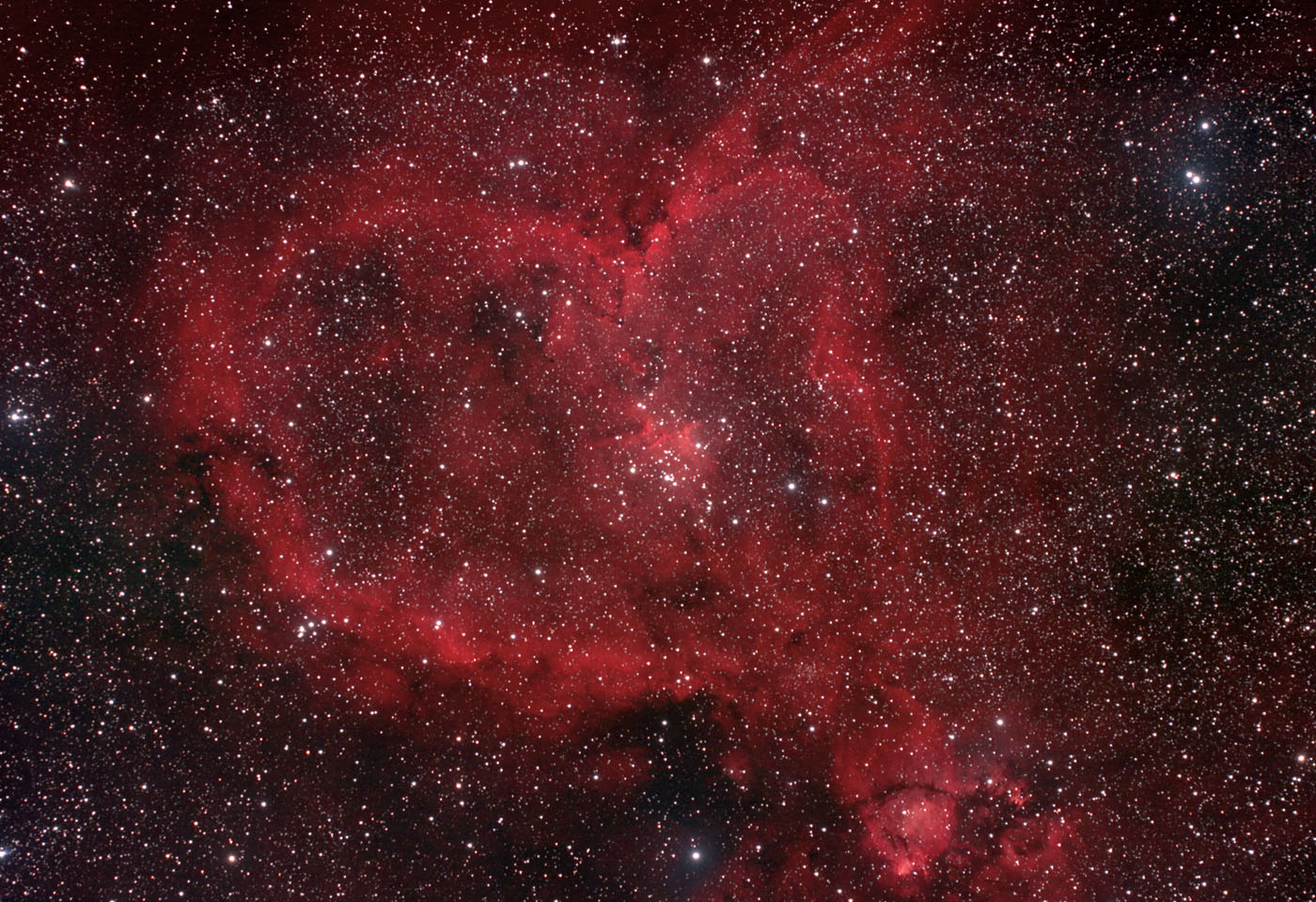
- An H-alpha image of the Heart Nebula. HD 15558 is located at the centre of the cluster, circled.

Observation data Epoch J2000.0 Equinox J2000.0
- Constellation: Cassiopeia
- Right ascension: 02^{h} 32^{m} 42.537^{s}
- Declination: 61° 27′ 21.57″
- Apparent magnitude (V): 7.87

Characteristics
- Spectral type: O4.5III(f) (O5.5III(f) + O7V)
- U−B color index: −0.55
- B−V color index: +0.43
- V−R color index: +0.38
- R−I color index: +0.40
- J−H color index: +0.18

Astrometry
Radial velocity (R_{v})	−45.10±1.50 km/s
Proper motion (μ)	RA: −0.478 mas/yr Dec.: −0.849 mas/yr
Parallax (π)	0.5764±0.0662 mas
Distance	approx. 5,700 ly (approx. 1,700 pc)
Absolute magnitude (M_{V})	−0.79

Orbit
Period (P)	442 days (1.2 yr)
Semi-major axis (a)	726 R_{☉}
Eccentricity (e)	0.37±0.07
Argument of periastron (ω) (secondary)	120°

Details
Mass	>152±51 M_{☉}
Radius	16.4 R_{☉}
Luminosity	~660,000 L_{☉}
Surface gravity (log g)	3.7 cgs
Temperature	39,500 K
Age	0.7-3 Myr

secondary
Mass	46±11 M_{☉}
Radius	5.6 R_{☉}

Other designations
- HD 15558, HIP 11832, SAO 12326, IDS 02251+6101, TYC 4046-44-1, UBV 2530, GCRV 1424, 2MASS J02324253+6127215, WDS J02327+6127, PPM 13720, BD+60°502, GSC 04046-00044, CCDM J02327+6127, IC 1805 148

Database references
SIMBAD	data

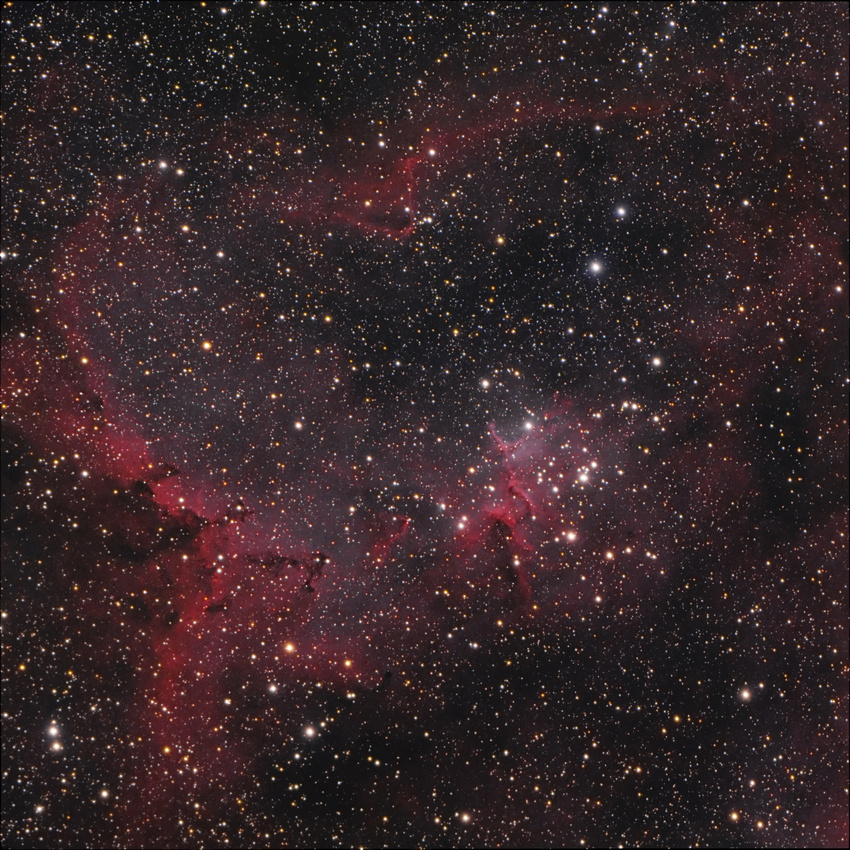
HD 15558 in the cluster IC 1805

HD 15558 (HIP 11832) is a massive O-type multiple star system in Cassiopeia and is specifically in our galaxy's Heart Nebula in the open cluster IC 1805. The primary is a very massive star with 152 M_{☉} and 660,000 L_{☉}.

== Physical characteristics ==
HD 15558 A is a spectroscopic binary system containing at least two massive luminous class O stars. The primary is an O4.5 giant star with a surface temperature over 46,800 K. It has a mass of 152 M_{☉} and a luminosity of 660,000 L_{☉}, making it one of the most massive stars in the Milky Way Galaxy. The star loses 1.5×10^{−5} M_{☉} per year. The secondary is an O7V star. It has a mass of 46 M_{☉}. The primary may itself be a double star, suggested by the improbably large mass found from the binary orbit when compared to the other stellar parameters.

The Washington Double Star Catalog lists 11 companions within one arc minute of HD 15558 A, all fainter than 10th magnitude. In addition, it lists component E just over one arc minute away; it is another hot massive star, the 9th magnitude BD+60°501 with a spectral type of O7 V(n)((f))z.

== See also ==
- List of most massive stars
- List of most luminous stars
