= Fish Head Nebula =

Nebula in the constellation Cassiopeia

Nebula
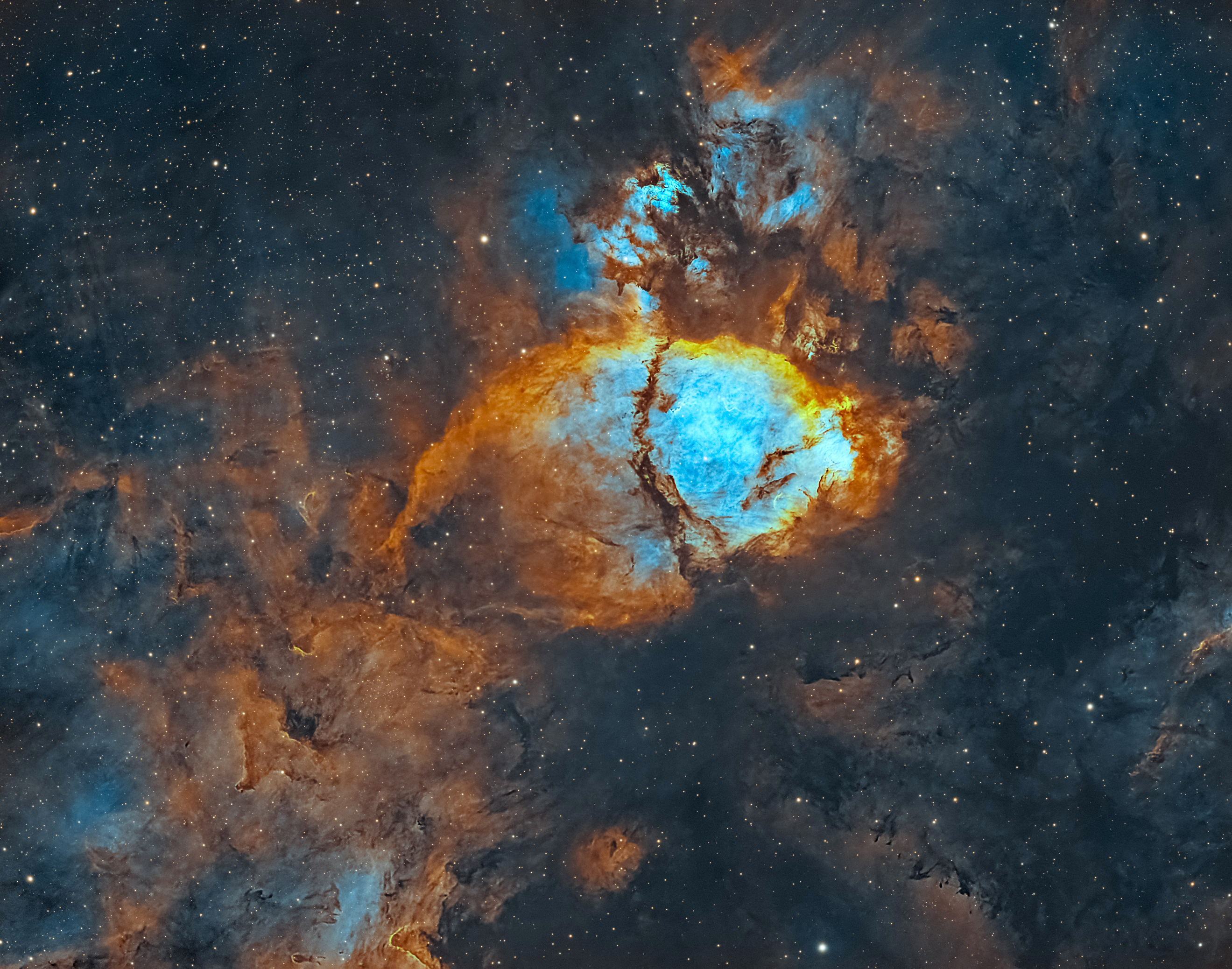
- The Fish Head Nebula captured with narrowband filters (H-Alpha, O-III, S-II) and processed in the Hubble Palette.

Observation data: J2000 epoch
- Right ascension: 02h26m
- Declination: +62°02'
- Constellation: Cassiopeia
- Designations: IC 1795, NGC 896, Northern Bear Nebula

The Fish Head Nebula, or the Northern Bear Nebula, is part of a large star forming system of gas and dust located along the Perseus Arm of the Milky Way. The nebula is located in the constellation Cassiopeia, approximately 6,000 light-years from Earth and is adjacent to the much larger Heart Nebula. The brighter region of the nebula is designated NGC 896 and is the home to many young and large stars. These stars radiate high amounts of ultraviolet light. This UV radiation excites the surrounding gas and causes it to shine at a high brightness. This mapping is known as false color and is common with many of the Hubble Space Images.

== Gallery ==
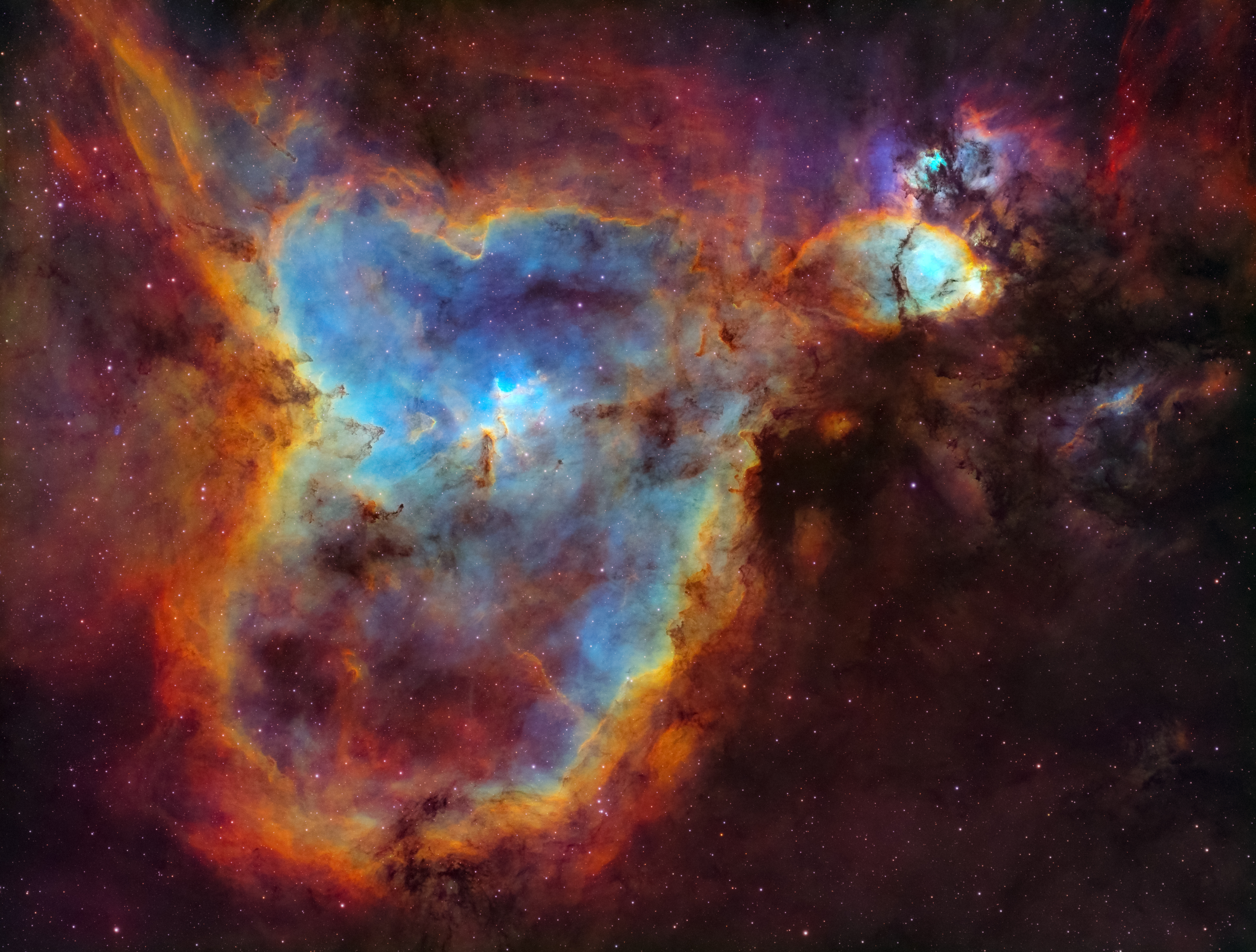
32 hours of narrowband exposure

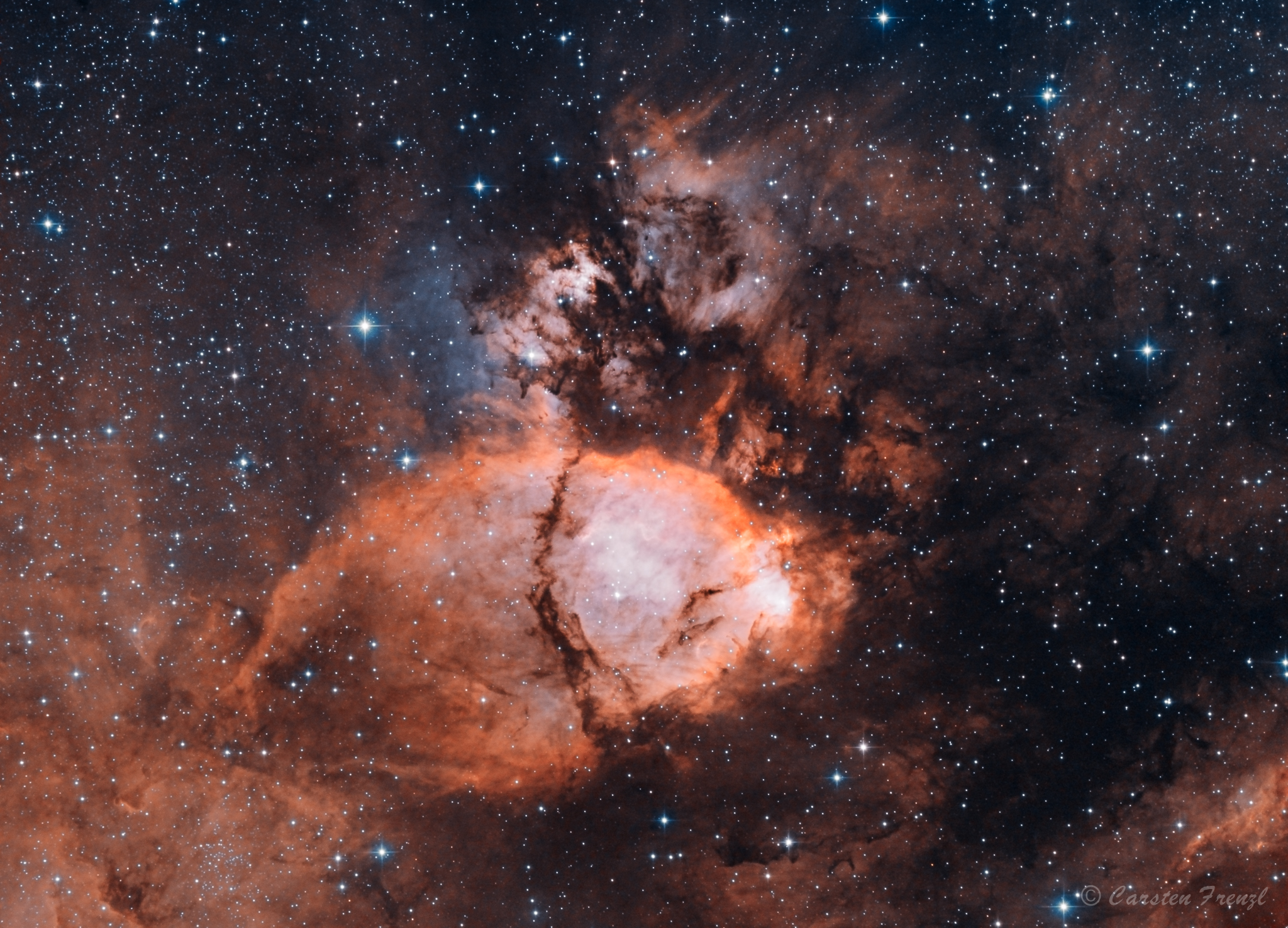
Fish Head Nebula (Photo: Carsten Frenzl)

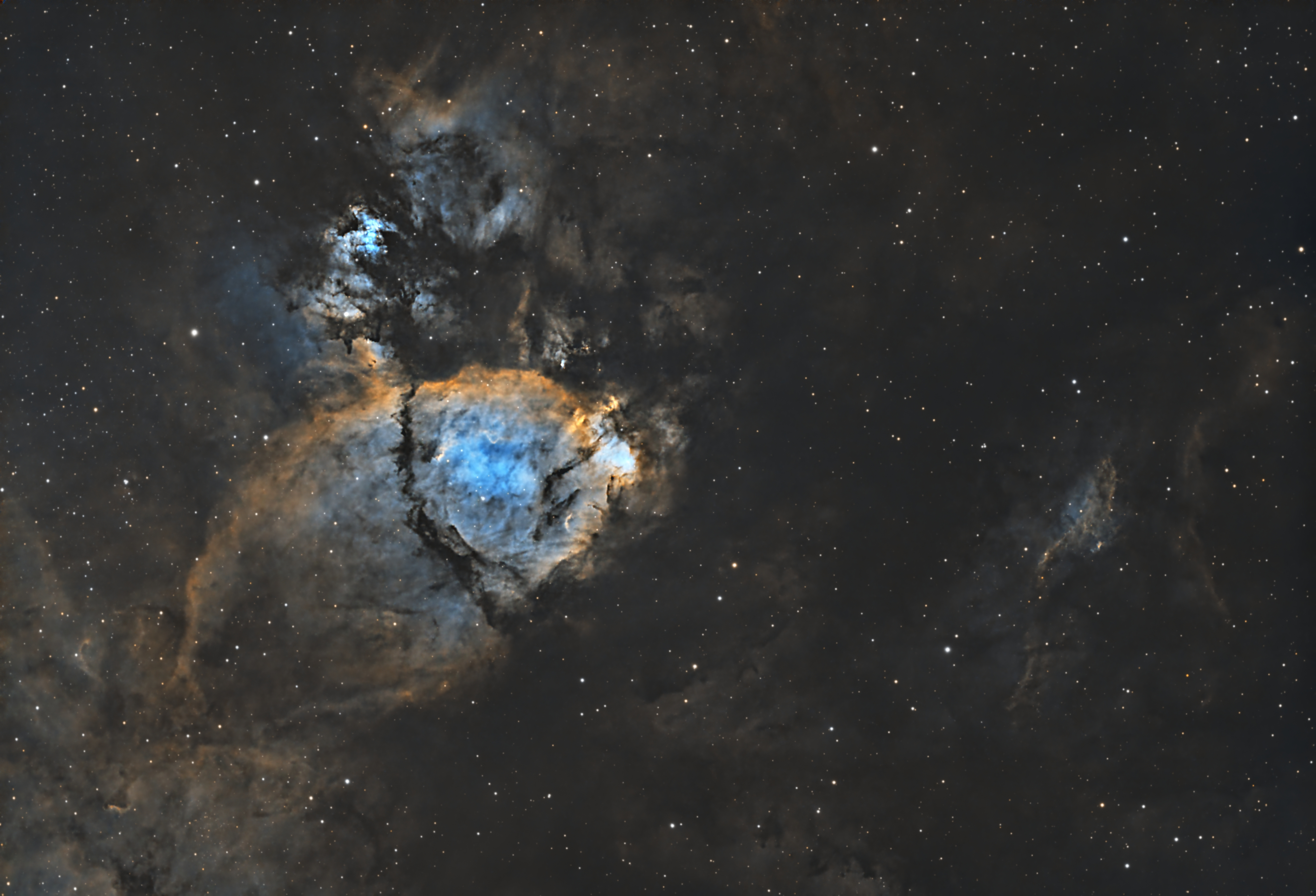

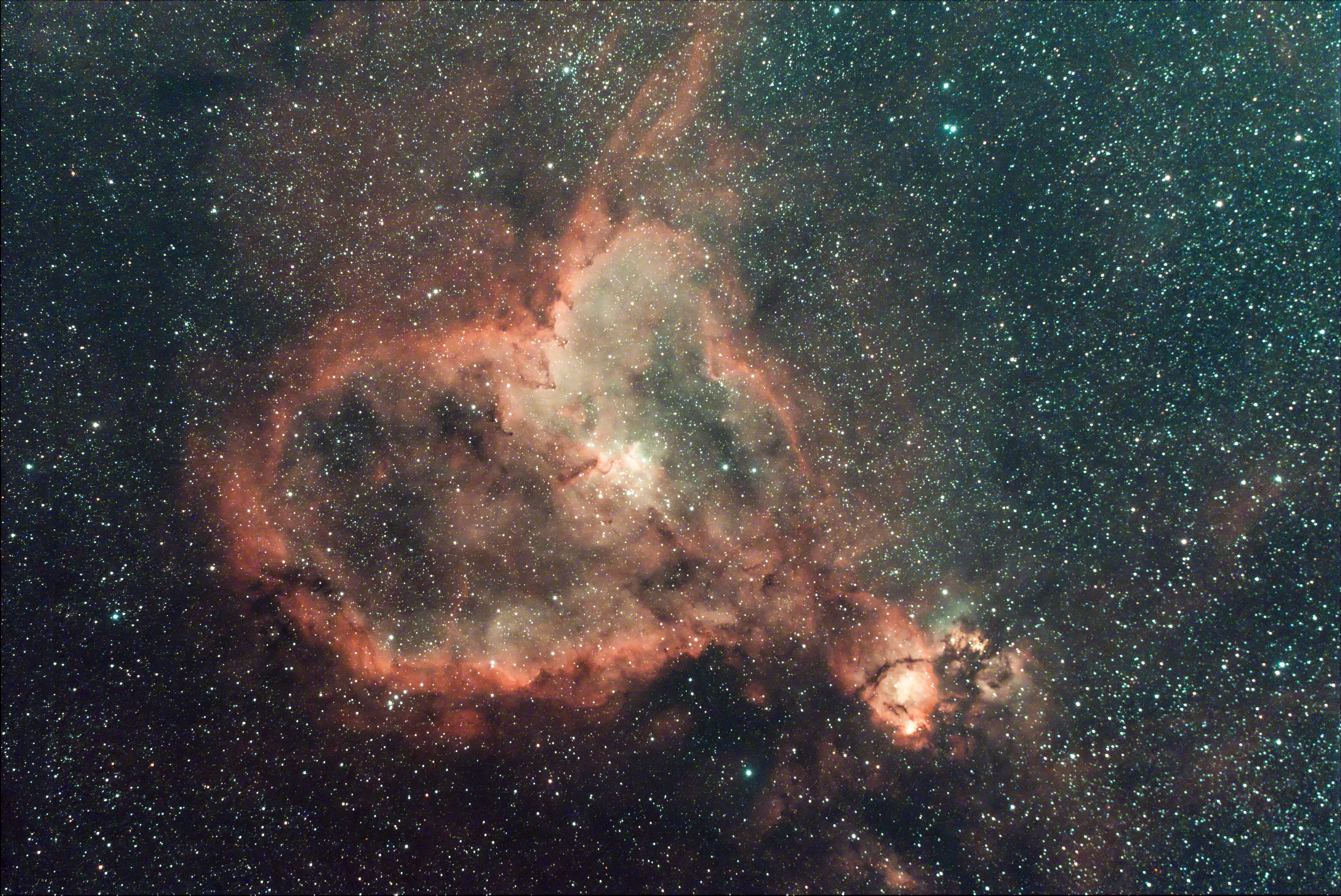

In false color ISH (Infrared, Sulfur-II, Hydrogen-alpha)

== See also ==
- Heart Nebula, another nebula nearby
- Nebula
- Astrophotography
