= Westerhout 5 =

Emission nebula in the constellation Cassiopeia

Emission nebula
- H II region
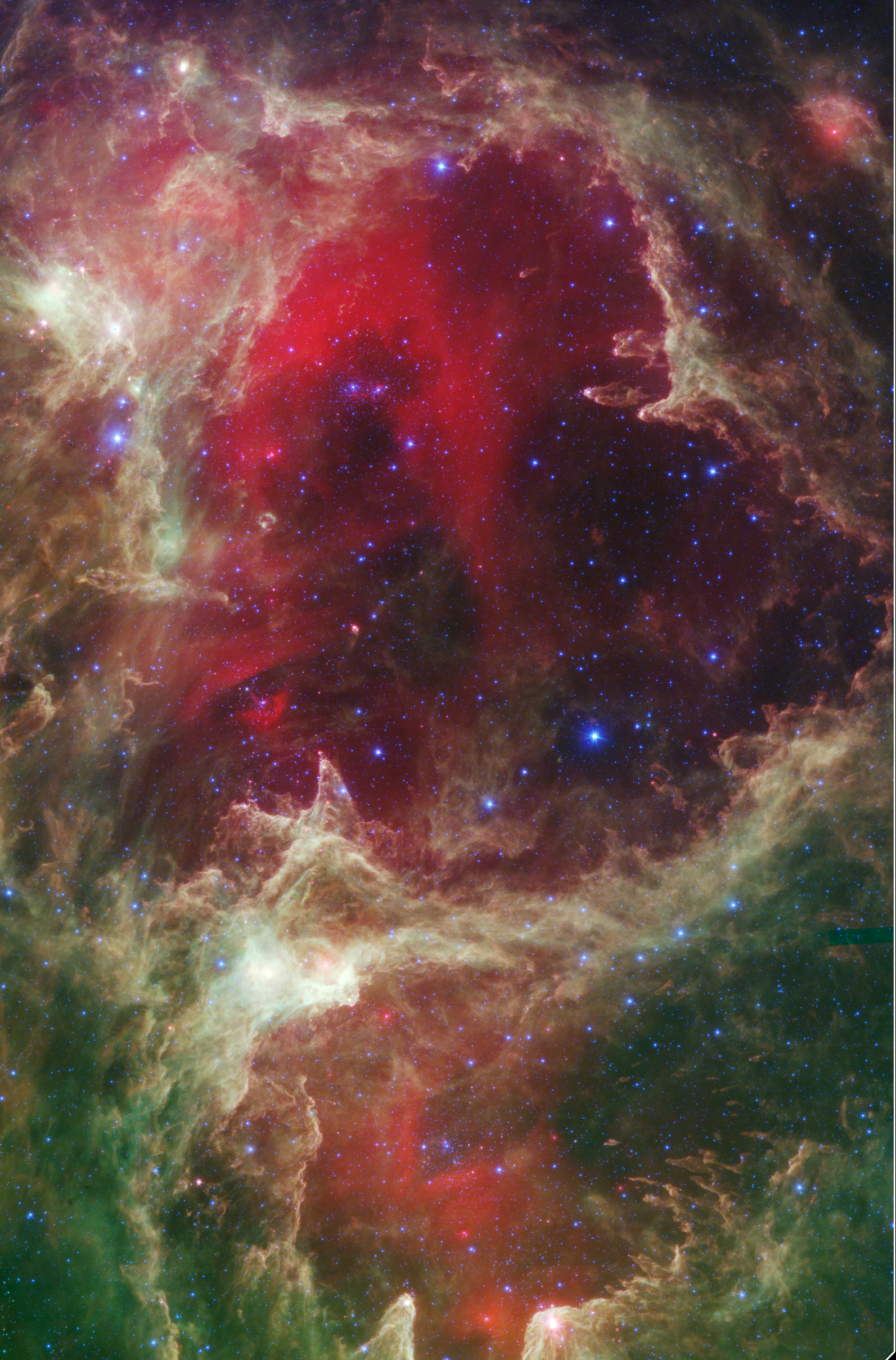
- Detail of Westerhout 5

Observation data: J2000.0 epoch
- Right ascension: 02^{h} 55^{m} 24^{s}
- Declination: +60° 24′ 36″
- Distance: 7,500 ly
- Apparent dimensions (V): 150' × 75'
- Constellation: Cassiopeia

Physical characteristics
- Radius: 165 ly
- Absolute magnitude (V): 6.5
- Designations: Sh2-199, LBN 667 - Cluster is IC 1848

Westerhout 5 (also known as W5, Sharpless 2-199, LBN 667, the Soul Nebula, or the Embryo Nebula) is an emission nebula located in Cassiopeia. Several small open clusters are embedded in the nebula: Collinder 33 and 34 in the head and IC 1848 (Collinder 32) in the body. The small emission nebula IC 1871 is present just left of the top of the head, and Sh2 199 is just below the lower back area.

The object is often called by the cluster designation IC 1848. W5 with W3 and W4 forms part of the larger W3/W4/W5 Complex.

The galaxies Maffei 1 and Maffei 2 are both located in apparent proximity to the nebula, although light extinction from the Milky Way makes them very hard to see. Once thought to be part of the Local Group, they are now known to belong to their own group – the IC 342/Maffei Group.

Westerhout 5 is the eastern neighbor of IC 1805 (Heart Nebula) and the two are often mentioned together as the "Heart and Soul".

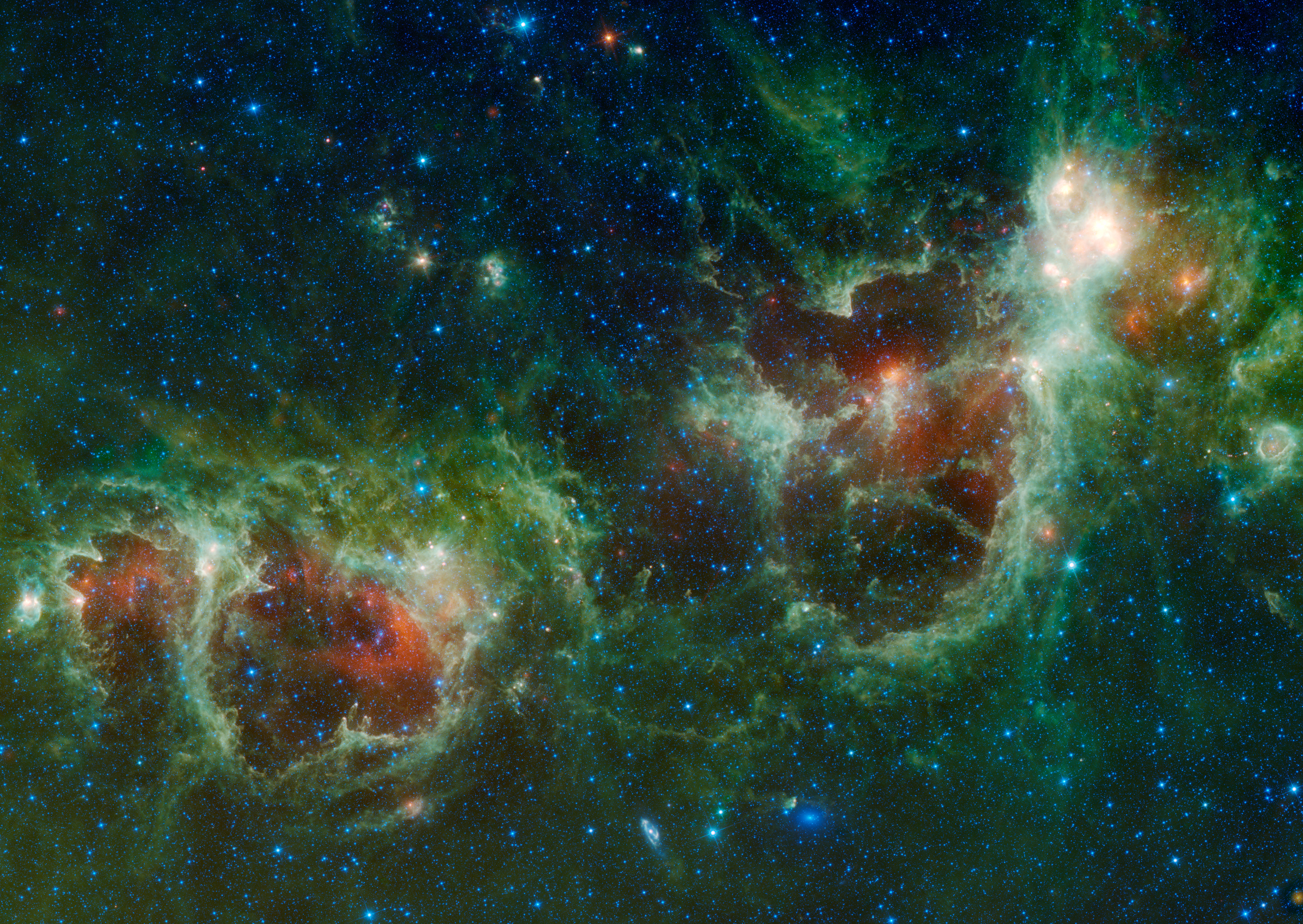
The Heart Nebula and Westerhout 5 are seen in this infrared mosaic from NASA's WISE telescope.

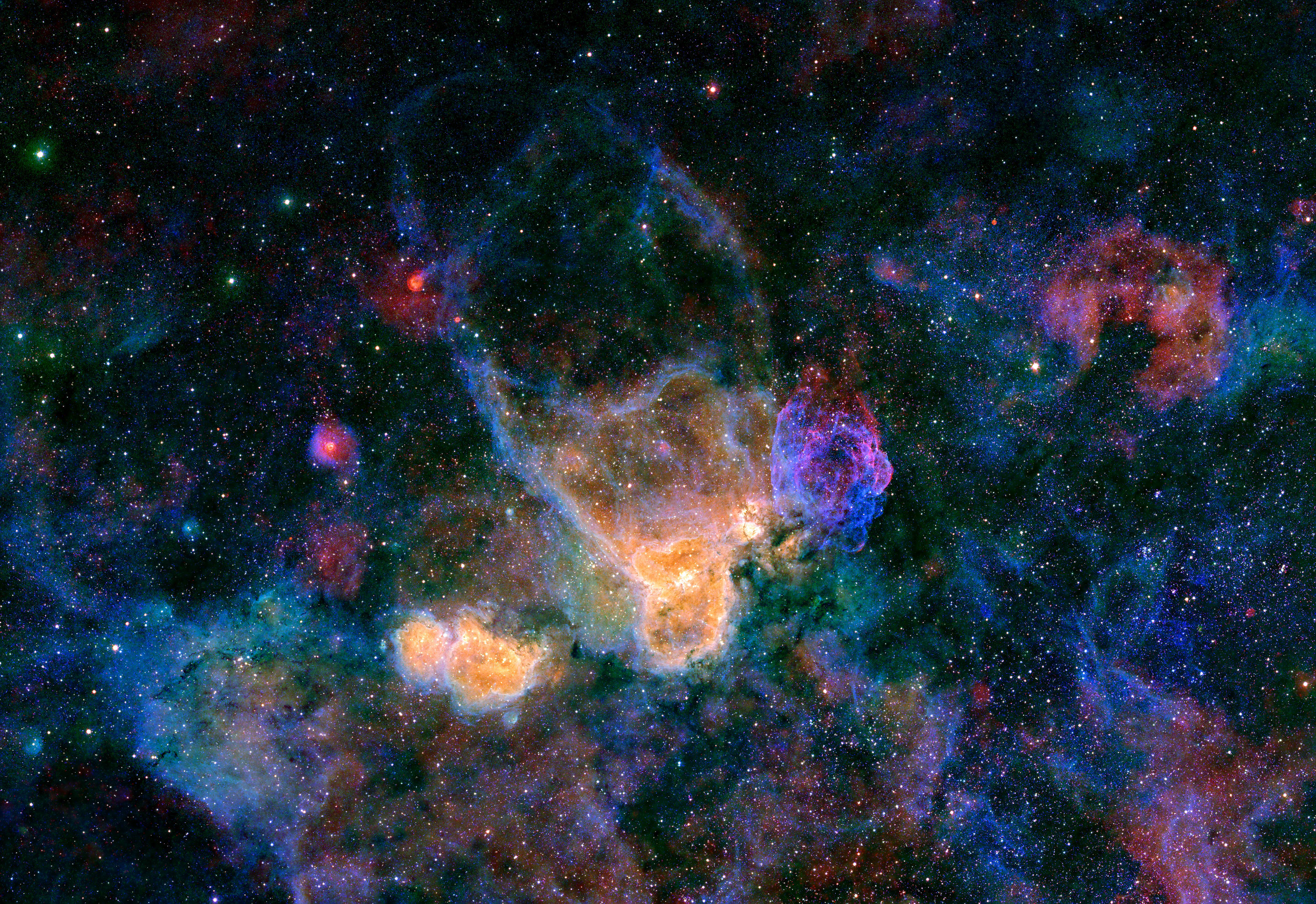
W3/W4/W5 complex (yellowish) in emission lines seen by the Northern Sky Narrowband Survey. W5 is the bright nebula at the bottom left of the center.

== Star formation ==
The W5 stellar blast furnace.

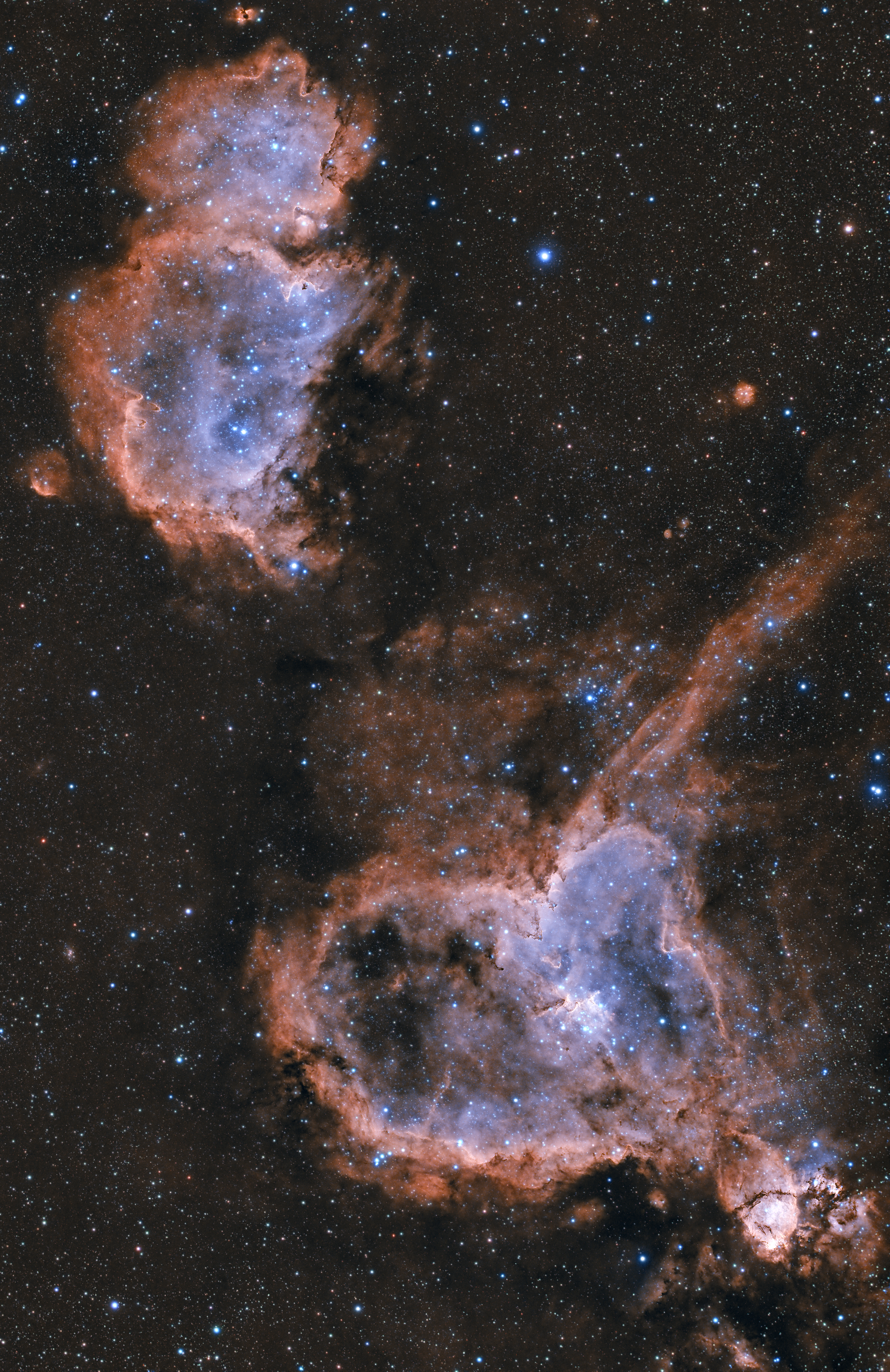
Heart and Soul. The Soul Nebula (Westerhout 5 or Sharpless 2-199), that is seen on the photo as colorful patch above, is an emission nebula located 7500 light years away from Earth in constellation Cassiopeia.The Heart Nebula (IC 1805 or Sharpless 2-190) is also an emission nebula located in constellation Cassiopeia. It displays glowing ionized hydrogen gas and darker dust lanes.

W5, a radio source within the nebula, spans an area of sky equivalent to four full moons and is about 6,500 light-years away in the constellation Cassiopeia. Like other massive star-forming regions, such as Orion and Carina, W5 contains large cavities that were carved out by radiation and winds from the region's most massive stars. According to the theory of triggered star formation, the carving out of these cavities pushes gas together, causing it to ignite into successive generations of new stars. The image in the gallery above contains some of the best evidence yet for the triggered star formation theory. Scientists analyzing the photo have been able to show that the ages of the stars become progressively and systematically younger with distance from the center of the cavities.
