= Heart Nebula =

Emission nebula in the constellation Cassiopeia

Emission nebula
- H II region
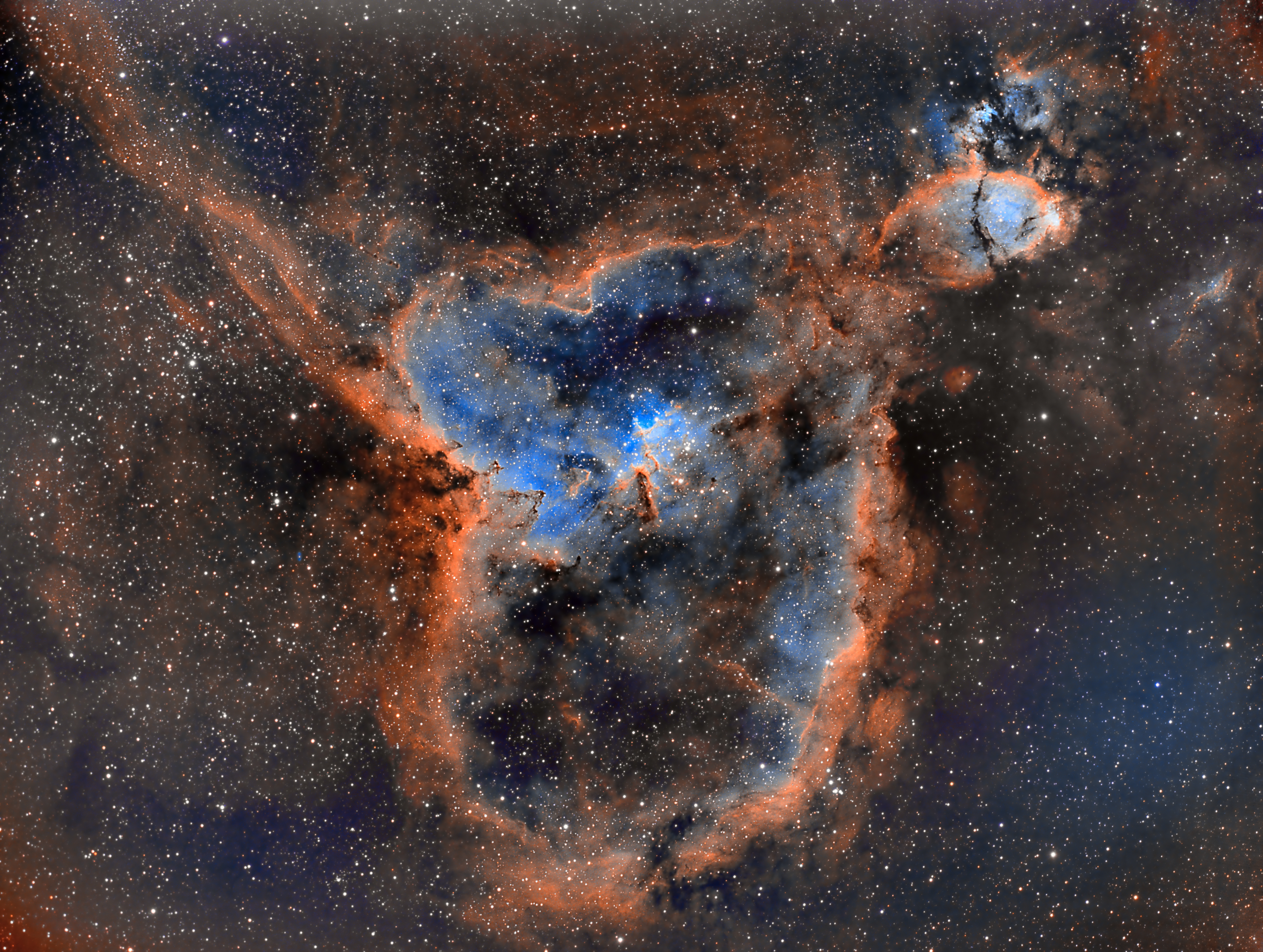
- Heart Nebula, with the Fish Head Nebula on the top right corner, narrowband image captured on a 70 mm scope

Observation data: J2000.0 epoch
- Right ascension: 02^{h} 33^{m} 22^{s}
- Declination: +61° 26′ 36″
- Distance: 7000 ly (2100 pc)
- Apparent magnitude (V): 6.5
- Apparent dimensions (V): 150' x 150'
- Constellation: Cassiopeia

Physical characteristics
- Radius: 165 ly
- Absolute magnitude (V): −5.1
- Designations: NGC 896, IC1805, Sh 2-190, Westerhout 4 (W4)

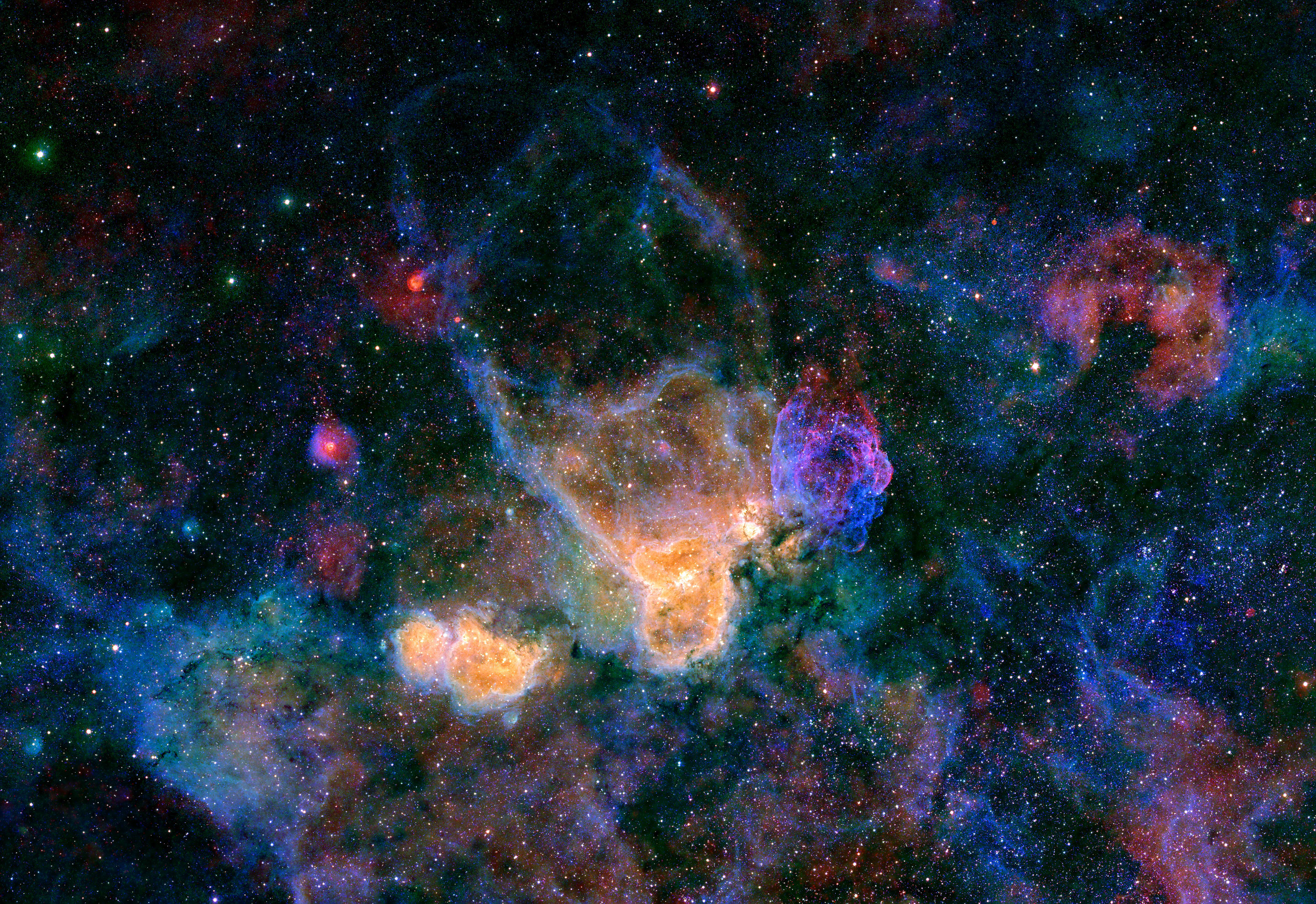
Heart Nebula as the brightest part of the W4 superbubble/chimney, as seen by the Northern Sky Narrowband Survey.

The Heart Nebula (also known as the Running Dog Nebula, Sharpless 2-190) is an emission nebula, 7,500 light-years (2,300 pc) away from Earth and located in the Perseus Arm of the Galaxy in the constellation Cassiopeia. It was discovered by William Herschel on 3 November 1787. In 1958, it was identified as a radio source by Gart Westerhout and is therefore also referred to as Westerhout 4 (or W4). It displays glowing ionized hydrogen gas and darker dust lanes.

The brightest part of the nebula (a knot at its western edge) is separately classified as NGC 896, because it was the first part of the nebula to be discovered. The nebula's intense red output and its morphology are driven by the radiation emanating from a small group of hot stars near the nebula's center. This open cluster of stars, known as Collinder 26, Melotte 15, or IC 1805, contains a few bright stars nearly 50 times the mass of the Sun, and many more dim stars that are only a fraction of the Solar mass.

The Heart Nebula is also made up of ionized oxygen and sulfur gasses, which are responsible for the rich blue and orange colors seen in narrowband images. The nebula also spans almost 2 degrees in the sky, covering an area four times that of the diameter of the full moon.

The Heart Nebula belongs to a larger structure known as the W3/W4/W5 complex. It is also the brightest part of a superbubble known as the W4 superbubble, sometimes referred to as the W4 chimney, as it is believed that hot gas is transferred from the galactic disk to the halo through this structure.

== Gallery ==
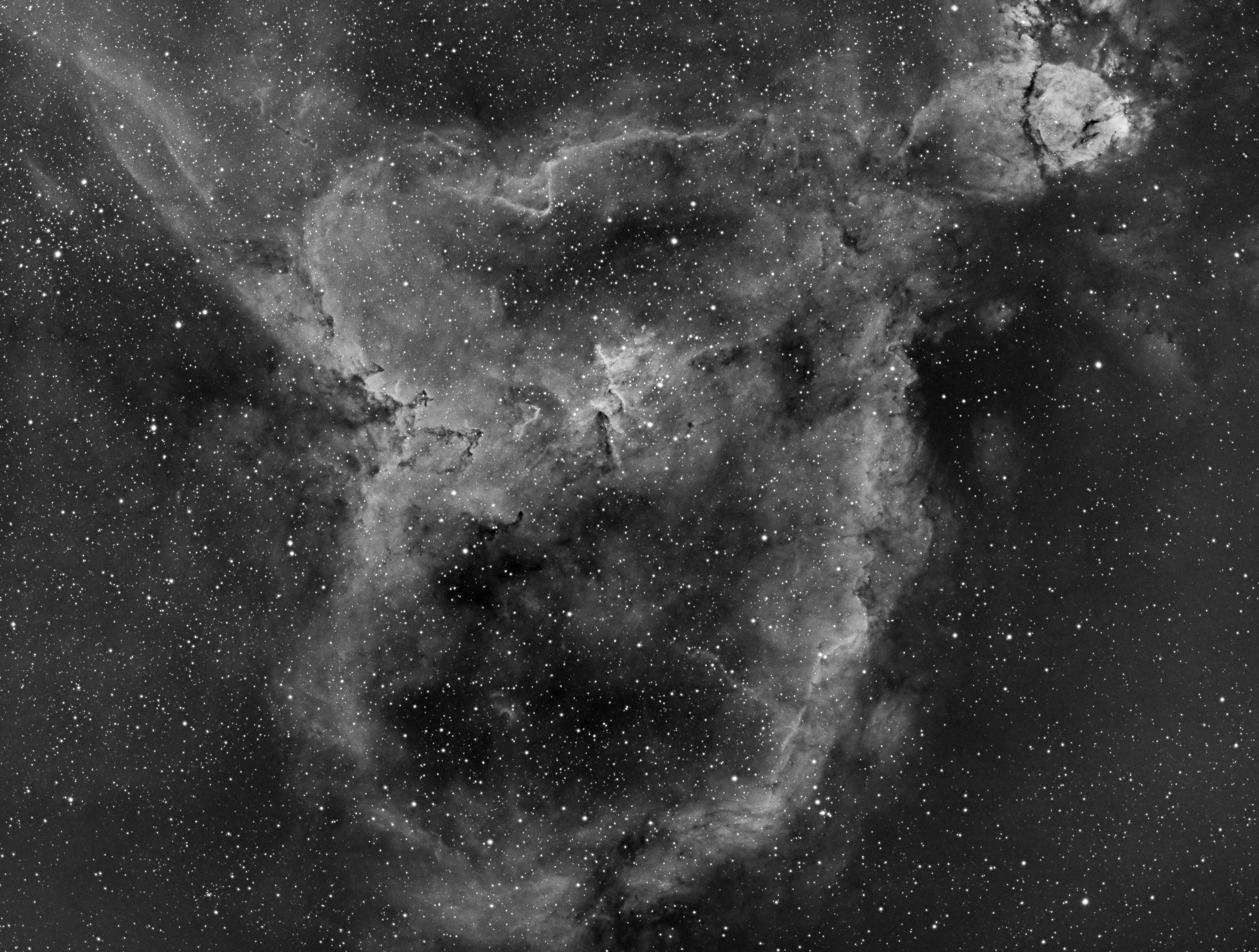

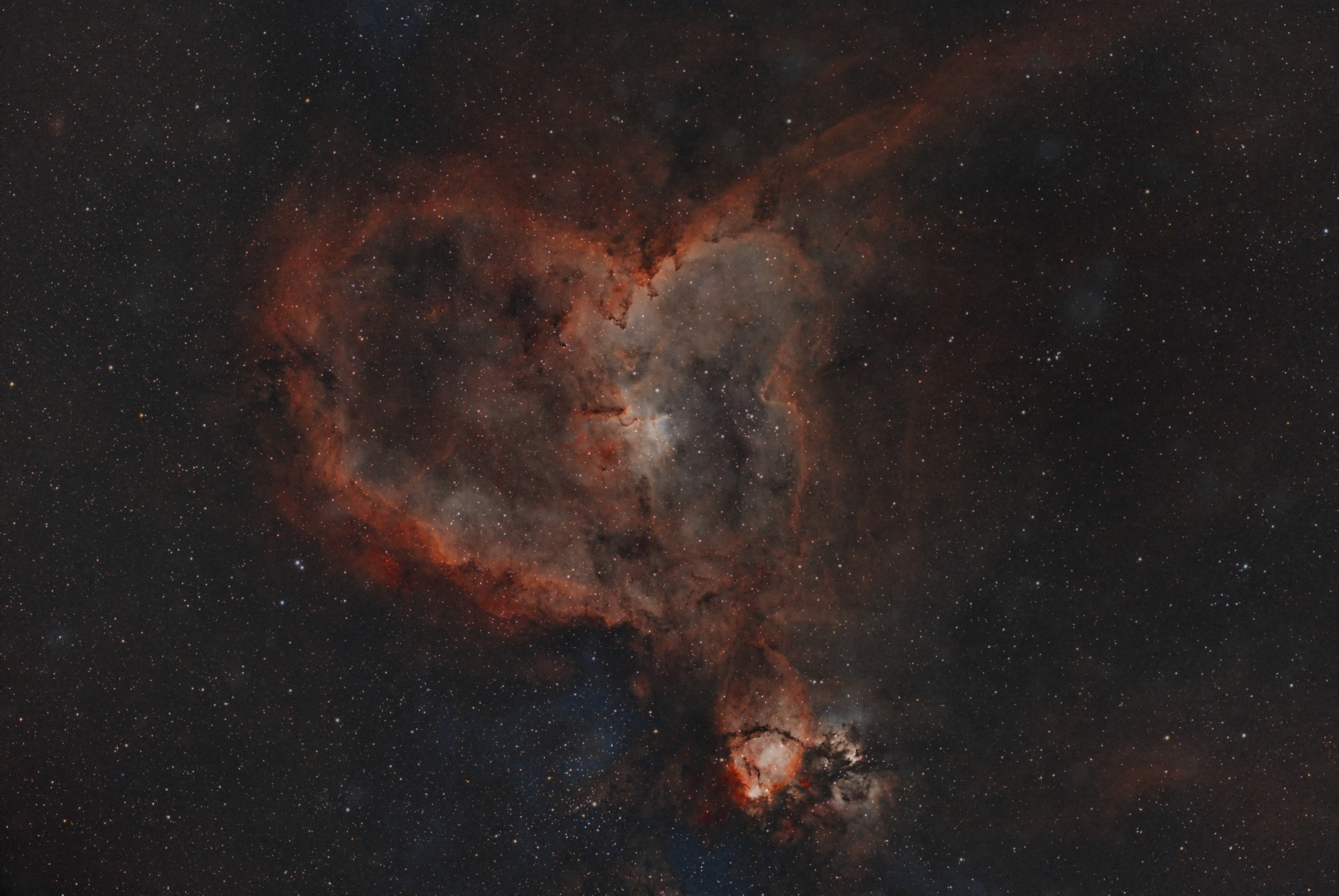
Image composed of 7 hours of RGB data collected in Escanaba, Michigan, United States

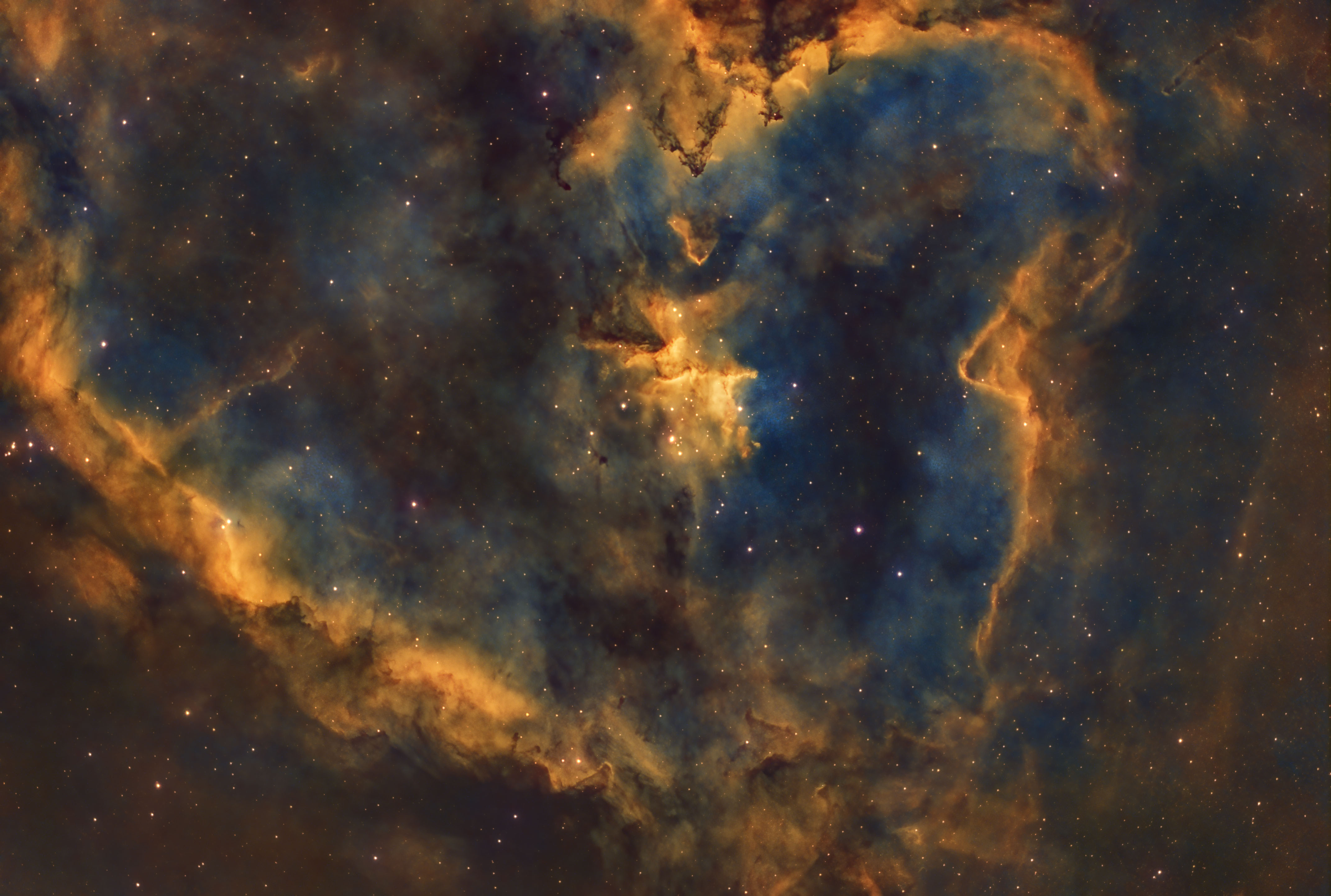

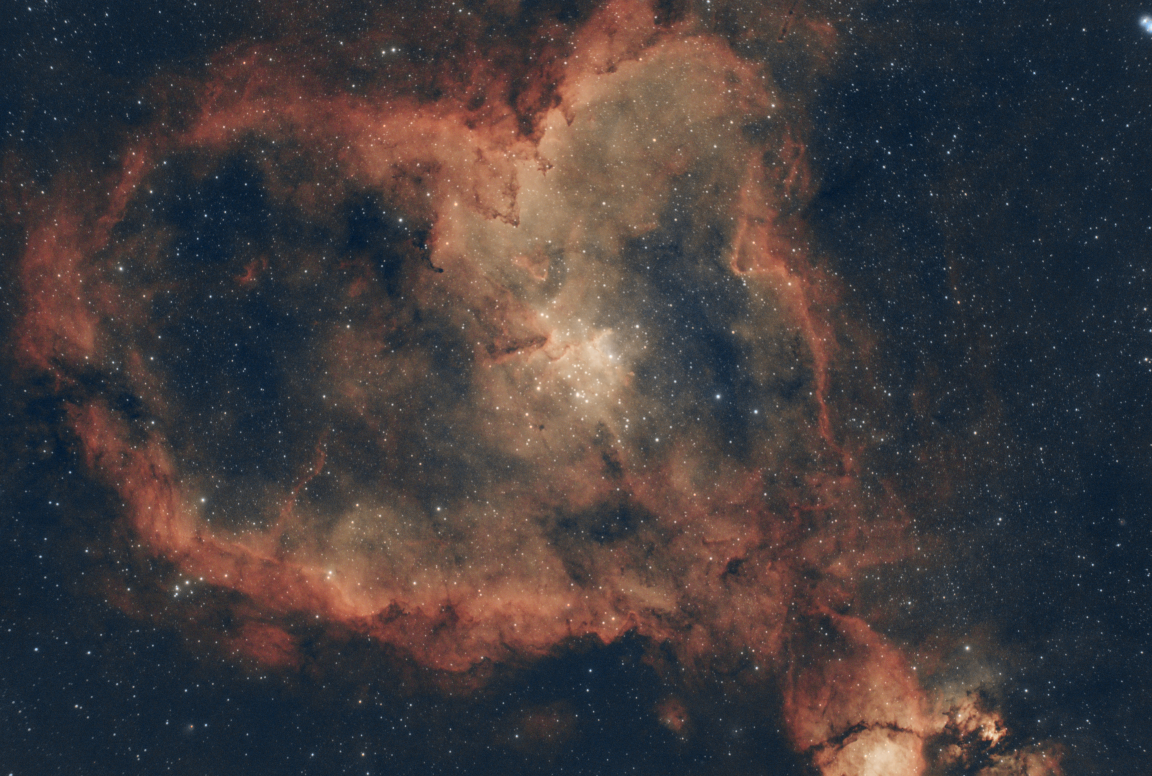
Capture on AT80ED on ASI294MC Pro with dualband filter in North Carolina

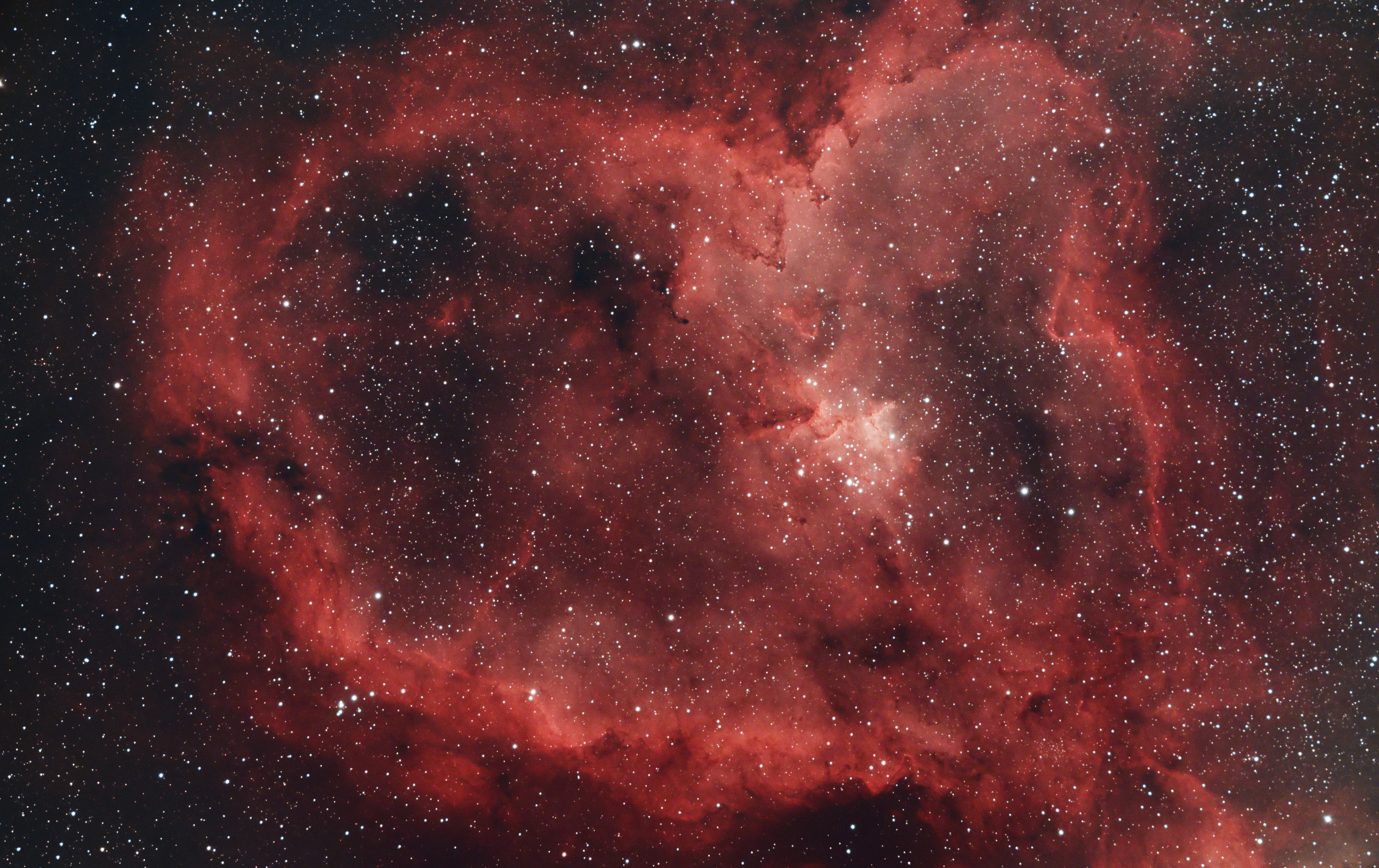
Heart Nebula captured on an ASI2600mc-pro with a Triad Narrowband Filter

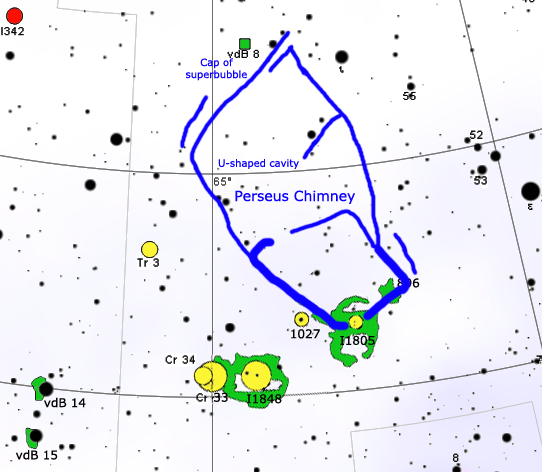
Heart Nebula as a part of a chimney candidate

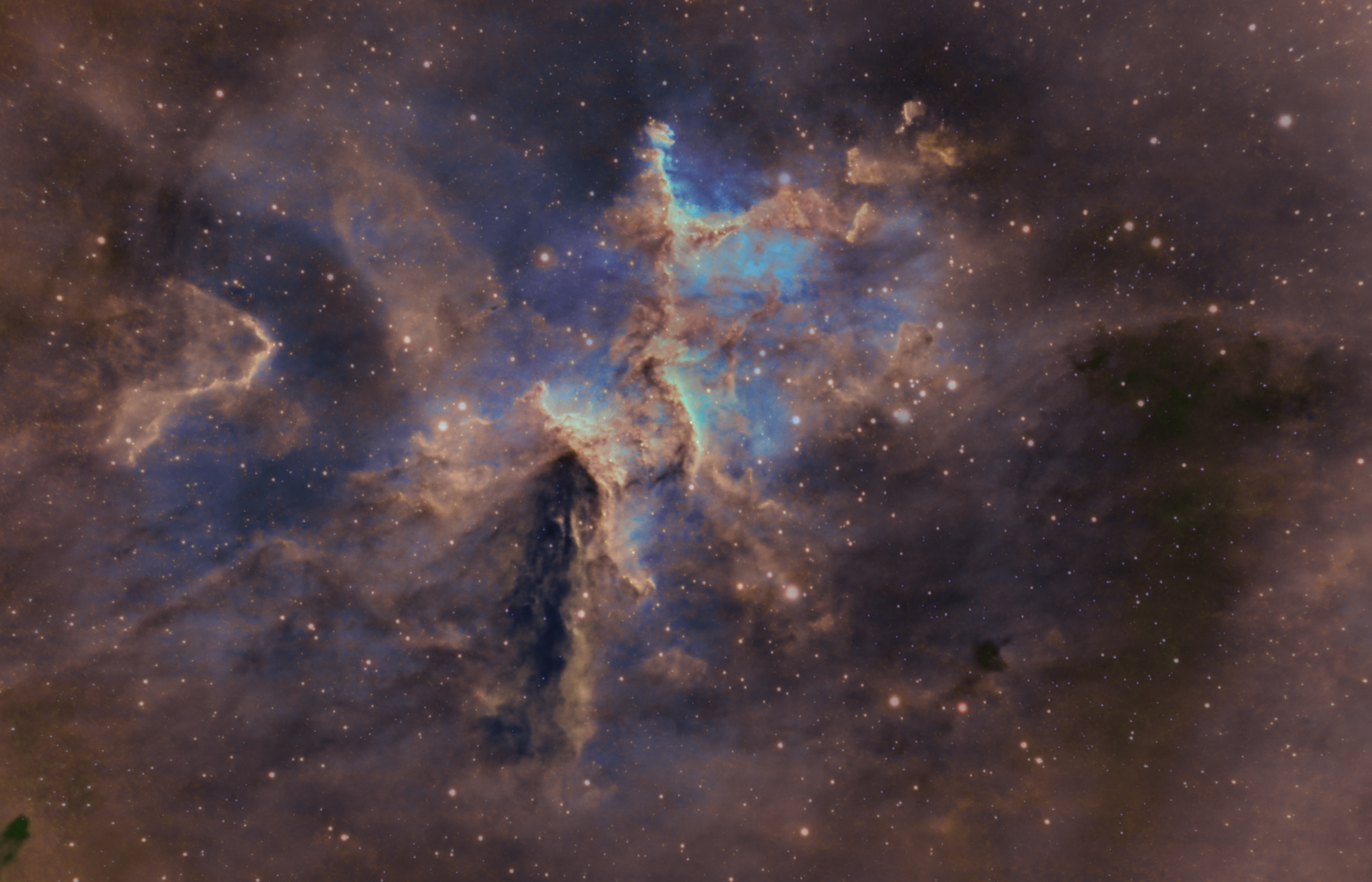
Melotte 15 is part of Heart Nebula. There are several bright stars here, some of them nearly 50 times mass of the Sun.

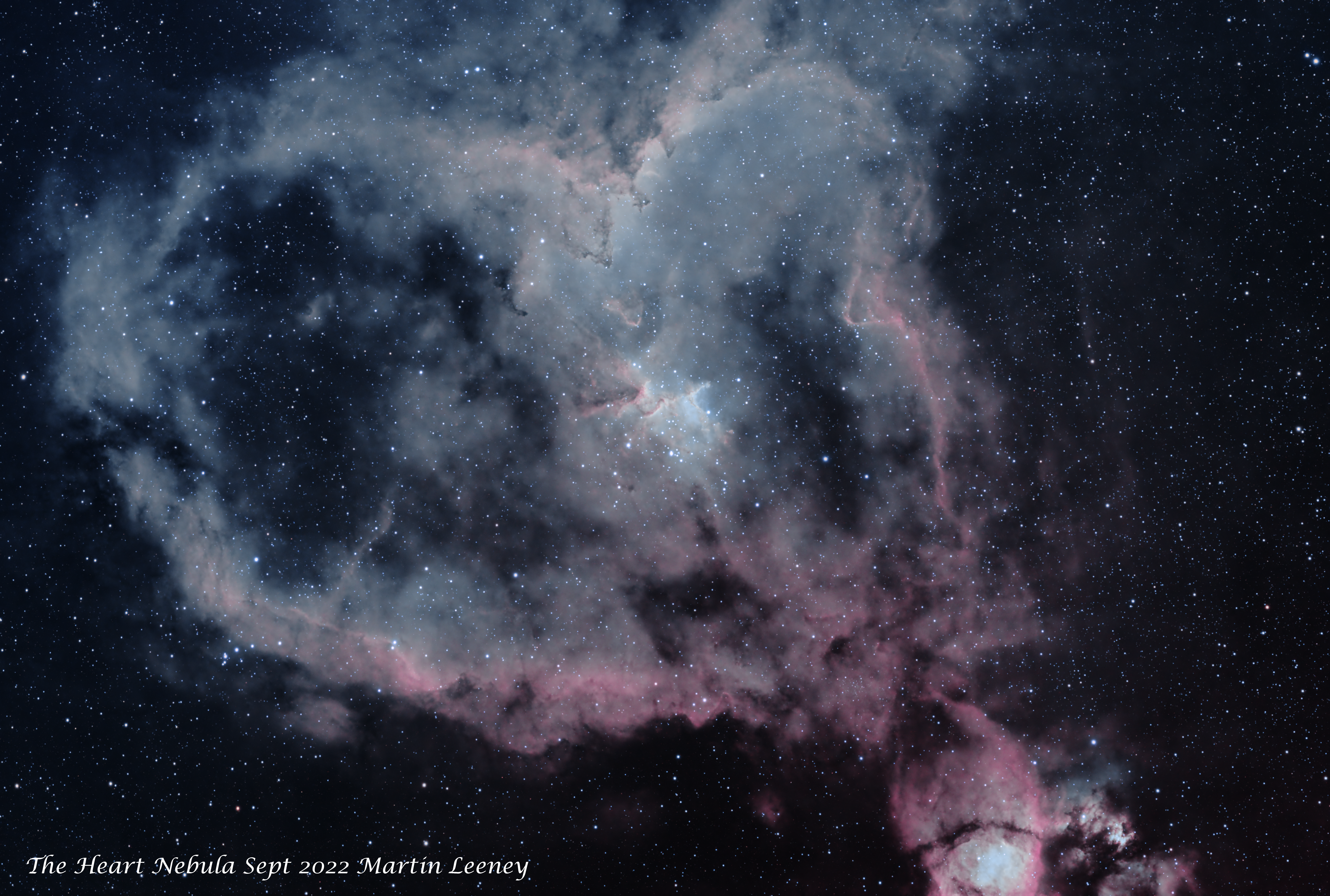
Captured from Manchester in September 2022

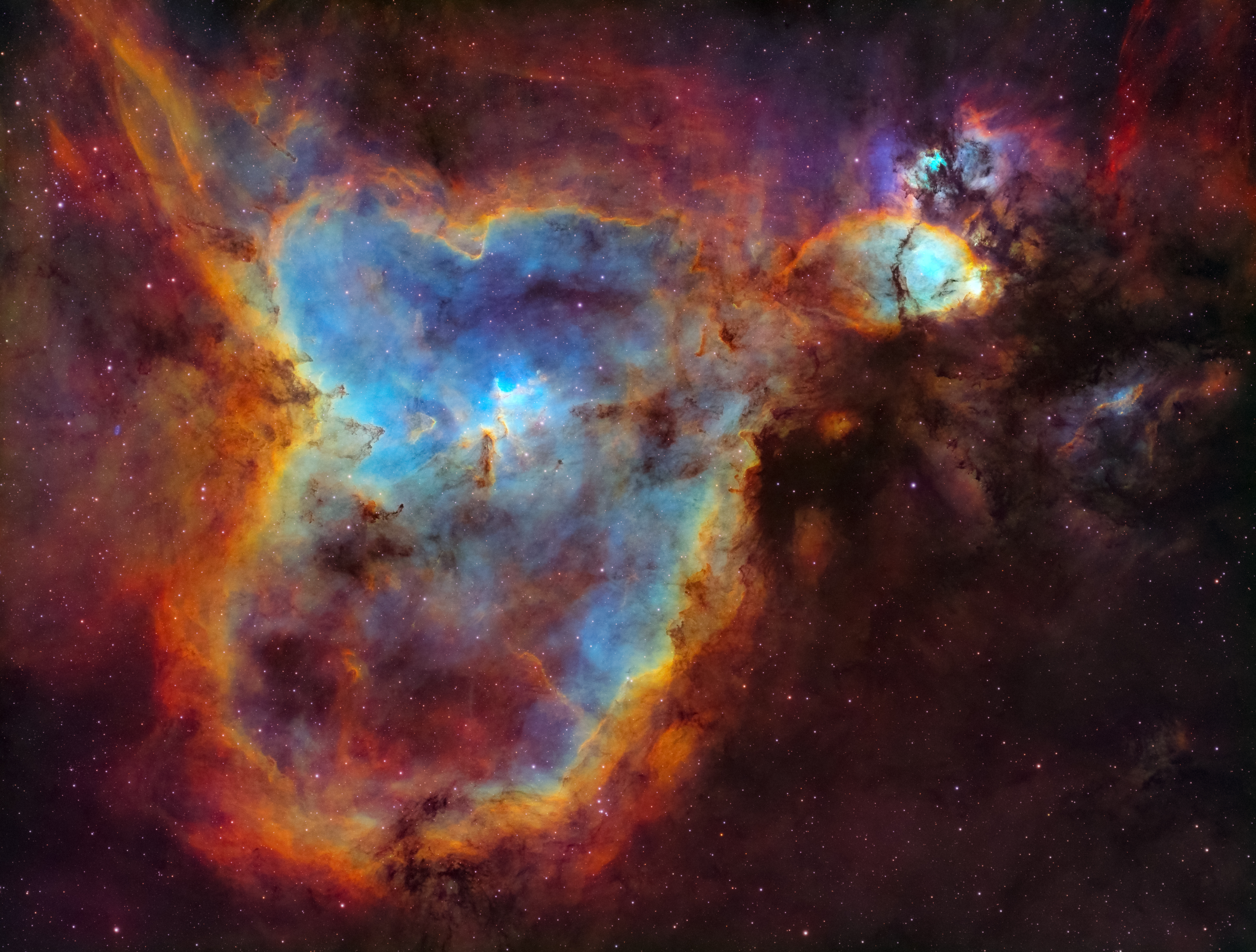
32 hours of Narrowband Exposure captured over 5 nights from Utica, Michigan, United States

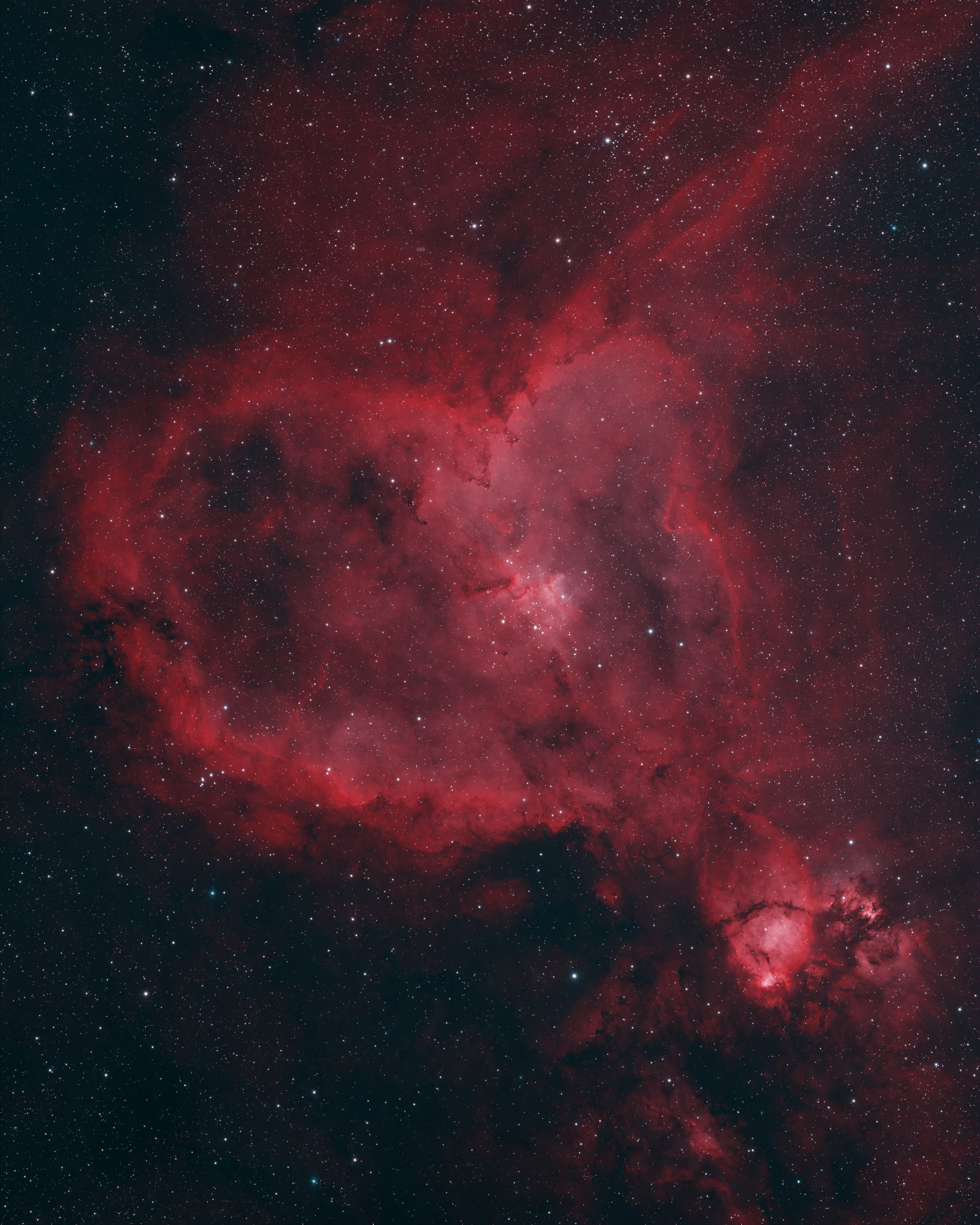
Heart nebula in HOO (hydrogen-oxygen-oxygen) where hydrogen is red and oxygen is blue, approximating true color

== See also ==
- Soul Nebula
- List of NGC objects (1–1000)
