= Star-forming regions of Cassiopeia =

Star-forming regions in the constellation Cassiopeia

Nebula
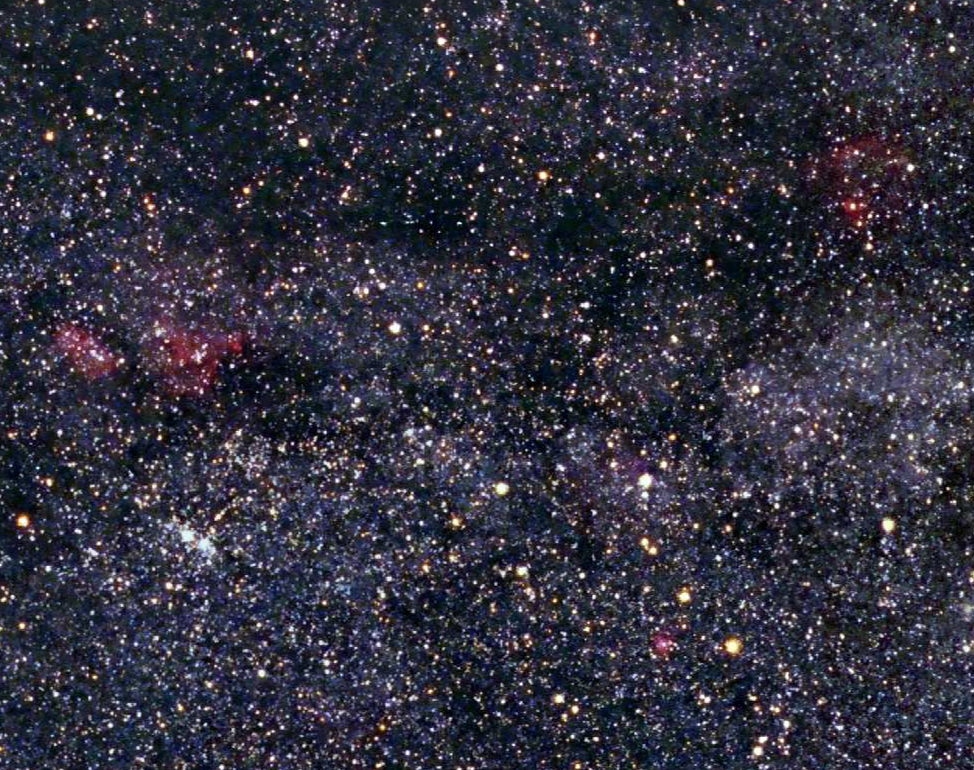
- The star-forming region of Cassiopeia

Observation data: J2000 epoch
- Right ascension: 01^{h}
- Declination: 65° ′ ″
- Distance: Orion Arm: 2600 ly; Perseus Arm: 6800 ly (Orion Arm: 800 pc; Perseus Arm: 2100 pc)
- Apparent magnitude (V): -
- Apparent dimensions (V): Entire constellation of Cassiopeia
- Constellation: Cassiopeia
- Notable features: Various non-homogeneous nebular systems distributed across multiple arms of the Milky Way

The star-forming regions of Cassiopeia are an extensive portion of the sky rich in giant molecular clouds and highly luminous associations of blue stars; the name derives from the constellation Cassiopeia, in which they lie as seen from Earth. The galactic structures observable in this celestial sector do not form a single complex but are instead several distinct complexes separated by thousands of light-years, appearing aligned along our line of sight.

The region closest to Earth lies on the outer edge of the Orion Arm, the secondary spiral arm that also contains the Solar System: it consists mainly of large concentrations of dark nebulae connected to the Cepheus complex, situated in a very northern position relative to the galactic plane and first observed by Edwin Hubble.

The more visible and extensive areas are located in the Perseus Arm, the spiral arm immediately exterior to ours, at a distance of over 7000 light-years; unlike the former, this region is not obscured, as it lies almost exactly on the galactic plane, where the line of sight is clearer in this direction. Here, some particularly bright OB associations are found, some associated with well-known open clusters such as M103 and NGC 457, as well as large nebular complexes, particularly visible on the eastern side of the constellation and connected to the famous Double Cluster in Perseus.

== Observation ==
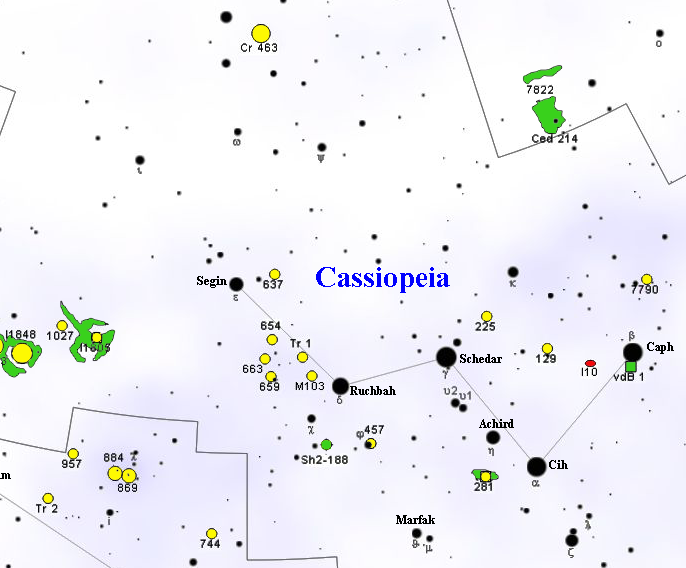
Map roughly outlining the image above; several isolated nebular complexes are present against a heavily obscured background.

The star-forming regions of Cassiopeia are located in the direction of the northernmost section of the Milky Way, deep in the Northern Hemisphere, within the eponymous constellation; however, despite their large extent, even their brightest structures are not visible to the naked eye or with small instruments: in this section, bright stars are scarce, and the background stellar fields are less rich compared to other areas of the galactic plane; even the luminous band of the Milky Way appears highly irregular and crossed by large dark bands due to the presence of extensive dark dust clouds that obscure the light behind them.

Located at a declination of approximately 65°N, the constellation Cassiopeia (and its nebular regions) is circumpolar from much of the northern hemisphere; Cassiopeia is one of the classic figures of boreal autumn evenings, appearing at the zenith in Canada, Northern Europe, and Russia. From the Southern Hemisphere, however, visibility is limited, and most of its regions remain below the horizon, never becoming visible.

The star-forming regions in Cassiopeia closest to us are located a few degrees north of the galactic equator. None of their objects are visible without the aid of a telescope: they are mostly concentrations of dark nebulae, occasionally highlighted by bright cocoons that shine by reflection due to one or more nearby stars; the associations of young stars are similarly obscured, to the point that the section of the sky where they should be visible appears as if it were far from the bright band of the Milky Way. In contrast, all the stellar regions in the Perseus Arm, over 8000 light-years away, are easily observable even with binoculars or an amateur telescope, thanks to their position on the galactic equator, which is much less obscured: thus, most of the open clusters visible in Cassiopeia, such as the well-known M103, NGC 457, and NGC 663, are located in this spiral arm, as are some of the best-known nebulae in the northern sky, the Heart Nebula and the Soul Nebula, connected to an extensive star-forming region.

=== Precessional epochs ===
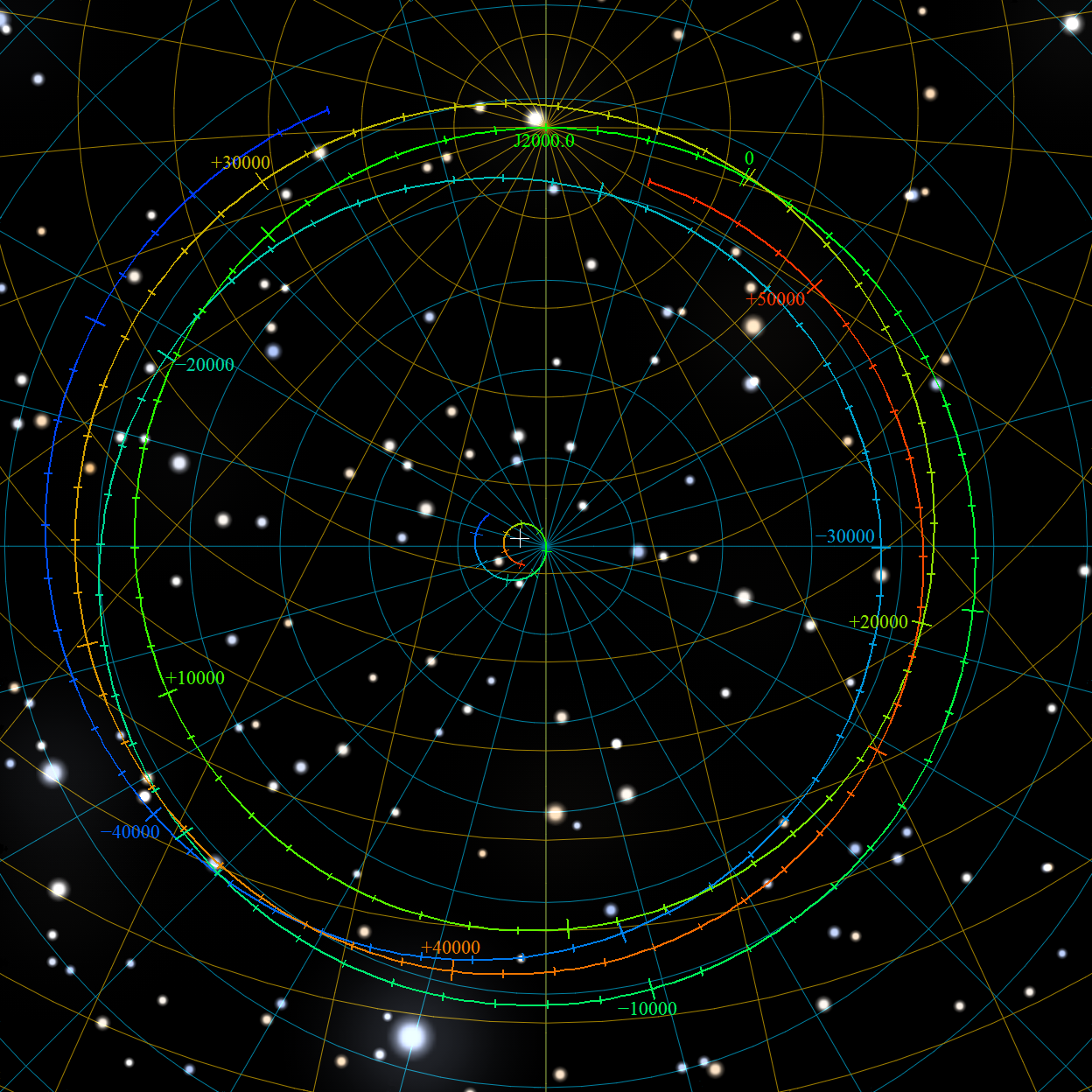
The projection of the precession path of the North Pole on the fixed sky of the J2000.0 epoch for the time interval from 48000 BCE to 52000 CE. The bright star at the bottom is Vega.

Due to the phenomenon known as the precession of the equinoxes, the celestial coordinates of stars and constellations can vary significantly, depending on their distance from the north pole and south pole of the ecliptic.

The section of the Milky Way in Cassiopeia is currently located at approximately 0h of right ascension, which corresponds to the point where the ecliptic intersects the celestial equator (equinox); the intersection at 18h with the ecliptic corresponds to the solstice of December 22, and that at 6h to the solstice of June 21.

In this precessional phase, the Cassiopeia complex tends to assume increasingly northern declinations. In about 5000 years, when the complex reaches 6h of right ascension, it will attain its northernmost point: at that time, as shown in the image, it will be a few degrees from the north celestial pole, as the latter will be located in the direction of the nearby constellation of Cepheus.

== Galactic environment and line of sight ==
The section of the Milky Way in the direction of Cassiopeia shows clear evidence of obscuration caused by large dust clouds, particularly in its northernmost part; this cloud system is the same as that visible in the adjacent constellation of Cepheus, representing its natural eastward extension. The closest nebular system in this direction, also the primary cause of obscuration, is located just over 900 light-years away and has an actual extent of about 260 light-years. This structure is connected to another, slightly more distant and larger complex known as the Cepheus Cloud; within it are several substructures, including a well-known Bok globule cataloged as Sh2-136 (in Cepheus): this is a dark cocoon visible against a faintly nebulous background, approximately 2 light-years in size, containing forming young stellar objects.

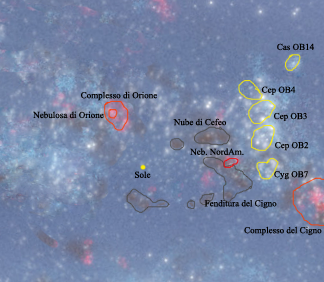
Schematic map of the galactic region between the Sun and the Cepheus-Cassiopeia complex.

The relationship of these two objects with the Gould Belt, the band of giant stars visible from Perseus to the group of southern constellations that made up the ancient constellation of Argo Navis, has not yet been confirmed: although the radial velocity suggests a connection to an expanding superbubble associated with the Belt, its position, relatively detached from the plane where the Belt lies, suggests it is a separate and independent structure.

Beyond this system of obscuring clouds lies a region less rich in nebular complexes, but south of the Cepheus line of sight, there is a rather sparse OB association known as Lacerta OB1; at a distance of 2600 light-years (800 parsecs), one of the largest giant molecular clouds in our spiral arm is located: a long dust belt stretching thousands of light-years transversely across the arm, formed by the Cygnus Rift and the Aquila Rift, which connects to another dark band visible toward Cepheus, with extensions reaching into Cassiopeia.

On the outermost edge of the Orion Arm, the core Cassiopeia complex is dominated by an OB association cataloged as Cassiopeia OB14; the most notable open clusters in the area are Cr 463 and ASCC 4, the former easily observable with an amateur telescope, while the latter is much fainter and more dispersed.

Beyond the Orion Arm lies the Perseus Arm, one of the major spiral arms of the Milky Way; some of the largest nebulae, such as the Heart and Soul complex, and stellar associations visible in Cassiopeia belong to this spiral arm. In this region, far from the nebular complexes of our spiral arm, some of the brightest OB associations in the entire Galaxy are found: Cassiopeia OB1, Cassiopeia OB2, Cassiopeia OB4, Cassiopeia OB5, Cassiopeia OB7, and especially Cassiopeia OB6.

== Structure ==
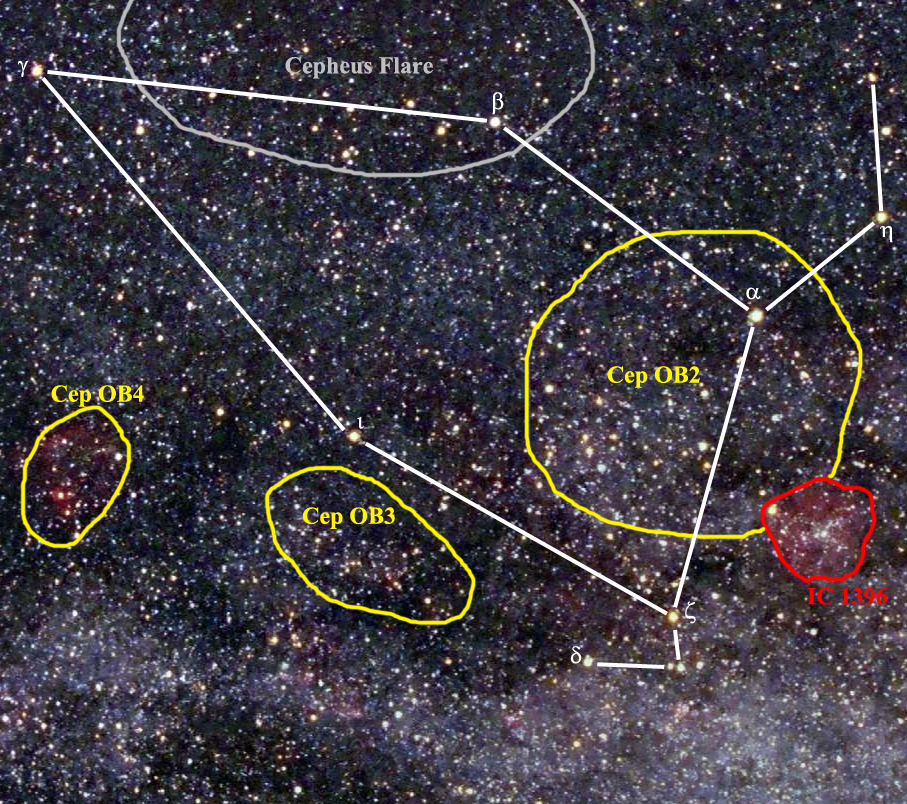
Mapped image of the constellation Cepheus, highlighting the complex's structures; the information is drawn from the publication Star Forming Regions in Cepheus. Understanding the structure of this region is crucial for comprehending its extensions toward Cassiopeia.

The Cassiopeia region does not have a uniform structure: as noted, the H II regions visible in this sector of the sky are located at various distances; within our spiral arm, two main areas can be distinguished: the closest, which is also the smallest and most obscured, at a distance of 180–600 pc, and the more extensive and richer region behind it, located on the outer edge of the Orion Arm, at 600–800 pc.

The most prominent region closest to us in this direction, excluding small clouds within a 200-parsec radius, is formed by the natural extension of the Cepheus complex. The term Cepheus Flare was coined by Edwin Hubble to describe the central area of Cepheus and northern Cassiopeia devoid of extragalactic objects, extending from the galactic plane to high galactic latitude regions where the Milky Way's glow becomes visible again, indicating the presence of a large amount of dust obscuring our Galaxy; its extent ranges between 100° and 120° of galactic longitude.

A study on the distribution of neutral hydrogen in the region detected the presence, at about 300-500 parsecs (approximately 1000-1600 light-years), of two dynamically distinct interstellar gas structures at galactic latitudes between +13° and +17°, moving at a relative velocity of about 1.5 km/s; these are likely expanding or colliding regions. Additionally, a large area of radio continuum emission, later called Loop III, was discovered, centered at galactic coordinates l=124±2°; b=+15±3° and extending over 65°, possibly created by a series of supernova explosions; this moving bubble structure indicates that the interstellar medium is subject to vigorous energetic dynamics: the wide range of different motions observed may reflect the action of multiple shock waves.

The regions beyond our spiral arm are much more extensive and complex, as well as less well-known due to their great distance (over 7000 light-years) and the obscuration of some areas; the spiral arm they belong to, the Perseus Arm, is, along with the Scutum–Centaurus Arm, one of the two major spiral arms of the Milky Way. The most prominent structures are by far the extensive OB associations, the result of intense ongoing star formation processes, and the Herbig Ae/Be star MWC1080, one of the most well-known and studied stars of this class. The most notable complex in this arm in the direction of Cassiopeia is that of the Heart and Soul nebulae, also known as W3/W4/W5, associated with two massive and luminous OB associations: Cassiopeia OB6 and Perseus OB1.

== Regions near the Sun ==
At a distance of 180±20 parsecs (590±65 light-years), the cloud LDN 1333 is a small dark nebula with an opacity class of 6, located at galactic coordinates l=128.88° and b=+13.71°. Its distance was estimated in the late 1990s, when it was also mapped at the wavelength of 13CO and C18O. According to data from these studies, LDN 1333 is a dark nebula devoid of stars, part of a long filamentary cloud structure extending approximately 30 parsecs. These studies also refer to this complex as a "molecular cloud," with evidence of ongoing star formation processes, including the presence of several infrared sources, such as IRAS 02086+7600, emitted by protostars and coinciding with Hα emission stars; comparisons with sources in nearby complexes, such as the Taurus-Auriga and Chamaeleon complexes, suggest that LDN 1333 is the smallest among known molecular cloud complexes where new star formation occurs. Additional evidence comes from the presence of several young T Tauri stars in the region between LDN 1333 and the high longitudes of the Cepheus Flare, in an area free of clouds. Studies of the dynamics and distribution of interstellar matter in this area revealed that the Cepheus Flare and the Cassiopeia region form an expanding superbubble enclosing an ancient supernova remnant; assuming a central distance of 300 parsecs, the bubble's radius would be approximately 50 parsecs, with an expansion velocity of 0.4 km/s. The total mass of the structure is estimated at about 720 M☉; the average mass of the thirteen densest areas of the nebula is approximately 9 M☉. At a greater distance, estimated at about 600 parsecs, lies the cloud known as LDN 1340; this is a dark nebula of opacity class 5 on the scale, illuminated in some areas by stars of spectral class A and B. Within it, several condensations are known, cataloged as RNO 7, 8, and 9, whose existence is typically interpreted as evidence of recent star formation activity. Additionally, observations at C18O allow the cloud to be divided into three regions with higher density than the surrounding interstellar medium: LDN 1340 A, B, and C. The total mass of the structure is estimated at about 1300 M☉. According to a 2002 study conducted in the near-infrared searching for young stellar objects, the nebula contains about a dozen HH objects: one of the most studied is HH 487, believed to be emitted by the IRAS 02224+7227 source, coinciding with an M-class T Tauri star; other well-known objects include HH 488, originating from RNO7, and HH 489, generated by the IRAS 02250+7230 source. RNO7 also gives rise to HH 671 and HH 672.

== Regions on the outer edge of the Orion Arm ==
Evidence of active star formation on the outer edge of the Orion Arm, in the direction of Cassiopeia, is provided by the presence of numerous young stellar objects surrounded by luminous cocoons and associated with jets of material; these formations are typical of the early stages of stellar evolution. The most significant objects in this sector are primarily observable in the infrared band.

=== V633 Cassiopeiae and the vdB 1 nebula ===
vdB 1 (also known as LDN 1265) is a dark nebula located at coordinates RA=0h11m and DEC=+58°50'; its significance is tied to the presence of a pre-main-sequence star known as V633 Cassiopeiae (or HBC 3 or LkHα 198), first identified in 1960. Its spectrum has been estimated as B3, B9, or A5 depending on interpretations, its distance is 600 parsecs (nearly 2000 light-years), and its actual luminosity is 160 L☉; it also exhibits strong cataclysmic activity, with flares. In the 1990s, a companion star embedded deep within the cloud was discovered, which appears to be the primary source of most near-infrared emissions observed in the region; the actual separation from the primary is approximately 3300 AU, and its luminosity is about 100 L☉.

Within the cloud, several material jets are known, coinciding with corresponding HH objects: these include HH 161, southeast of V633 Cas and linked to its hidden companion, HH 162, associated with the nearby V376 Cas, and HH 164, whose source is V633 Cas itself. V633 Cas and its companion are also linked to three additional jets, cataloged as HH 800, HH 801, and HH 802, with a powerful jet visible in optical light extending about 2 parsecs (approximately 7 light-years).

=== LDN 1287 ===
LDN 1287 is a filamentary dark nebula located approximately 850 parsecs (about 2800 light-years) from the Solar System, extending along the galactic plane for about 10 parsecs (33 light-years); it has been mapped at various wavelengths, and its mass was estimated in a study conducted in the early 1990s, yielding a value of 240 M☉. Within it are at least four separate condensations aligned with the nebular filament, plus an infrared radiation source cataloged as IRAS 00338+6312, originating from a protostar fully enveloped by a dense cocoon of gas and dust; this source is associated with a bipolar molecular jet, with emissions at the wavelengths of water and methanol. The cloud also hosts the young star RNO1, of spectral class F5e; a short distance away, just 50", equivalent to 0.2 parsecs, lies a fainter second object, RNO1B, a FU Orionis variable, correlated with another star of the same type, RNO1C, with which it may form a binary system; this pair is likely the driving source of the molecular jet. Additionally, six other stellar-origin sources are known within the cloud, along with another region of nebular condensation.

=== LDN 1293 ===
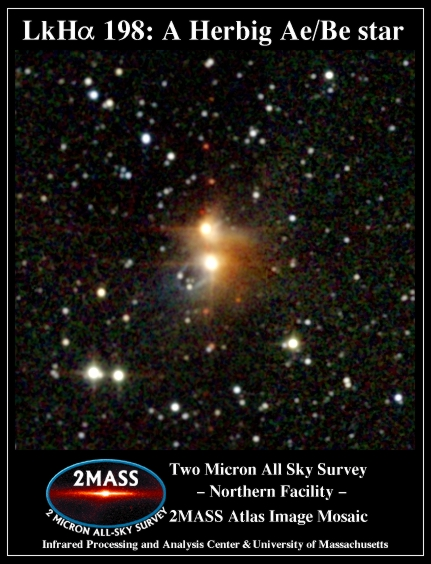
The dark region of LDN 1265 (vdB 1), illuminated in small patches by the light of nearby stars; V633 Cas stands out.

LDN 1293 is a dark nebula with an opacity class of 4; it contains two infrared radiation sources, plus a third visible in its direction but likely a more distant, independent object. Its emission lines, similar in characteristics and position to those around L 1287, suggest that the two clouds are part of the same elongated molecular structure, associated with the stellar association Cas OB14, located at approximately 850 parsecs.

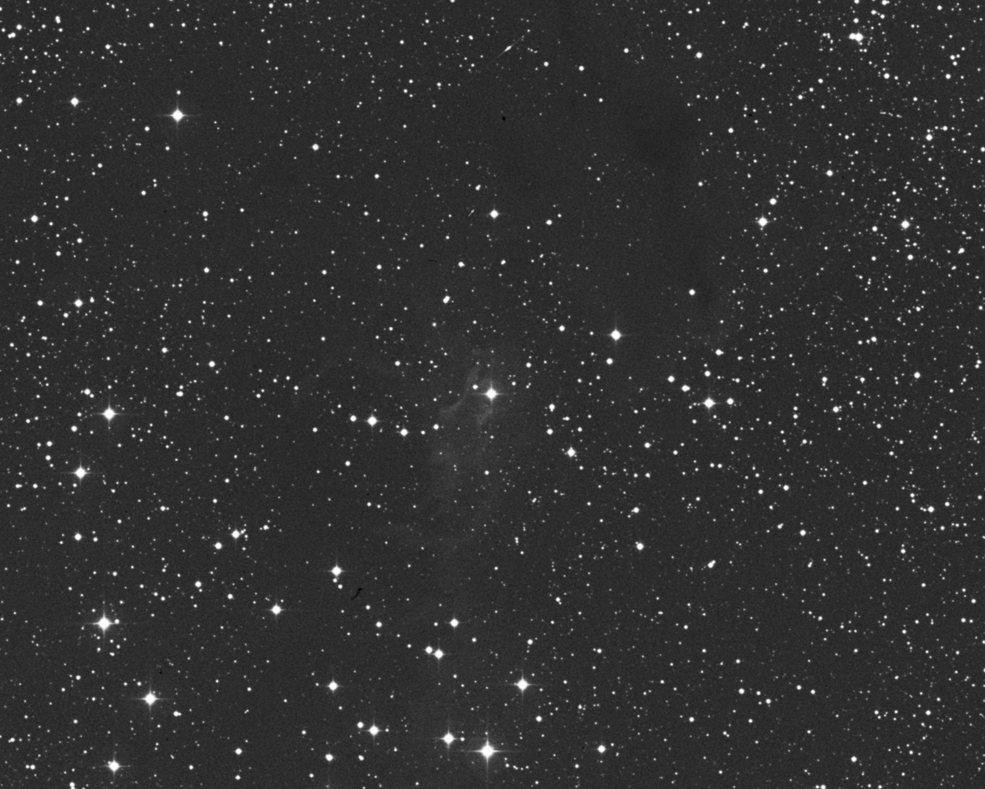
The dark region of V594 Cas.

The extent of LDN 1293 is 9x5 parsecs, and its mass is estimated at about 640 M☉; the strongest source identified here is IRAS 00376+6248, which has a bipolar molecular jet and is enveloped in a high-density nebular region. The spatial distribution and dynamics of the interstellar medium in the region suggest the existence of a large expanding bubble with a central position at galactic coordinates l=122° and b=+10°, located at a distance of 800 parsecs with a radius of 100 parsecs; the mass of neutral hydrogen it contains is approximately 10,000 M☉. According to observations, both LDN 1287 and LDN 1293 lie on the edge of this bubble.

=== LDN 1302 ===
LDN 1302 belongs to the group of the two previous clouds, a small dark cocoon hiding several young stellar objects; among these, V594 Cassiopeiae (BD+61 154), of spectral class B8, stands out, along with seven other stars with strong Hα emissions, cataloged from LkHα 199 to LkHα 205. Nearby, both physically and in actuality, is a small open cluster known as NGC 225; however, the physical connections between the cloud, its young stars, and this cluster appear to be only apparent, as their ages differ significantly: NGC 225 is estimated to have formed about 120 million years ago, while the cloud’s stars, such as V594 Cas, are only a few million years old, or even less in some cases. Their proper motion also appears to differ. A later study, however, questioned this conclusion, noting that 15 of the 28 main member stars show an excess of near-infrared radiation, suggesting that the cluster's age may be much younger, on the order of a few million years, and that it may contain pre-main-sequence stars. There is general agreement on the distance, estimated at about 650 parsecs or slightly less.

=== Sh2-187 ===
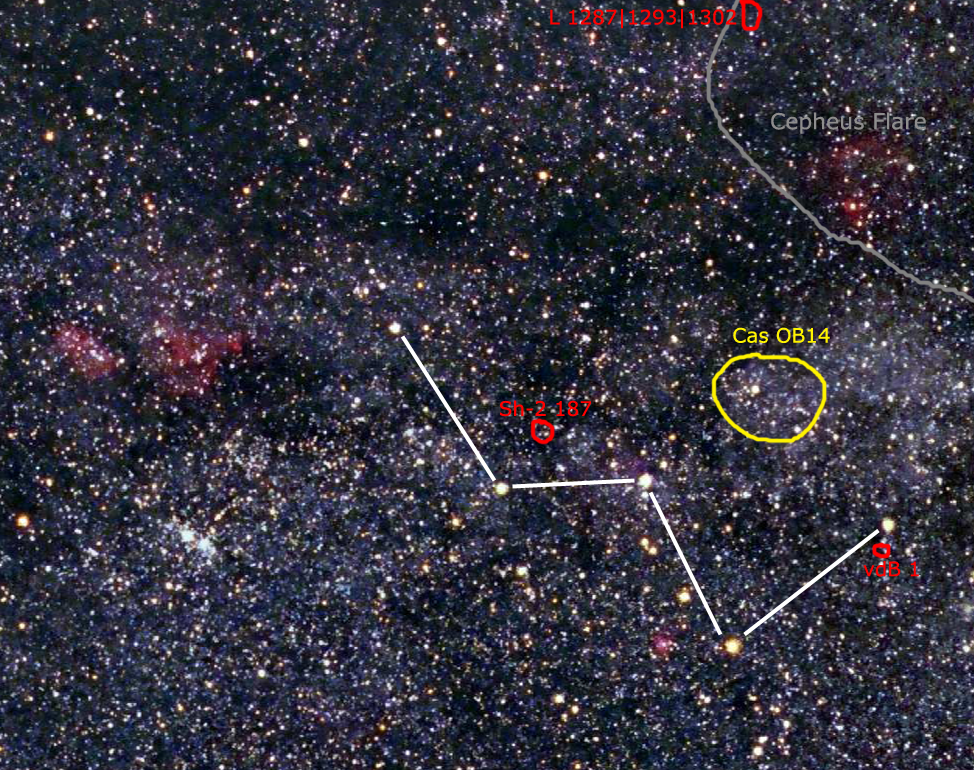
Mapped image of the constellation Cassiopeia, highlighting the structures of the complex in the Orion Arm; information is drawn from the publication The space distribution and kinematics of supergiants.

Sh2-187 is an H II region visible in optical light, with relatively small apparent dimensions (diameter 0.9') and located on the outermost edge of the Orion Arm; visually, it appears surrounded by the dark nebula LDN 1317. Its distance has been estimated through spectrophotometric studies at about 1440 parsecs (4700 light-years) by observing the exciting stars of this and other surrounding clouds; its coordinates are RA=1h 23m and DEC=+61° 51', coinciding with those of the source 2MASS J 01230704+6151527.

The cloud is part of a large molecular complex, identified in the mid-1980s and mapped by various researchers, at whose center lies a high-velocity molecular jet originating from an infrared radiation source cataloged as S 187 IRS, located very close to another strong source, IRAS 01202+6133. Through these mappings, it was discovered that the visible part of the cloud is surrounded by an extensive envelope of neutral hydrogen, detectable at wavelengths other than visible light, with a total mass estimated at about 7600 M☉.

Evidence of star formation activity can be found in the numerous infrared sources discovered in the nebula, including those mentioned above and the molecular jet; in particular, one of the most powerful sources is IRAS 01202+6133, deeply embedded in a dense, luminous cocoon clearly identifiable in the infrared (S 187 IRS), whose visible light counterpart is known as S187Hα: it is likely a Herbig Ae/Be star.

=== Cassiopeia OB14 ===
An OB association is a recently formed stellar association containing dozens of massive stars of spectral class O and B, which are blue and very hot; they form together in giant molecular clouds, whose residual gas, once the stars are formed, is swept away by strong stellar winds. Within a few million years, most of the brightest stars in the association explode as supernovae, while smaller stars survive much longer due to their lower mass. It is believed that most stars in our Galaxy originally belonged to OB associations. Paradoxically, OB associations in other galaxies are often easier to study than those in our own, due to the presence of dark clouds that obscure most objects within the Milky Way.

In detail, Cassiopeia OB14 is defined by four extremely luminous supergiant stars located in the same spatial region as LDN 1287 and LDN 1293; its distance, calculated as the average of the distances of the four main stars, is approximately 1100 parsecs (3600 light-years), slightly greater than that of nearby associations, particularly Cepheus OB4. According to studies conducted in the early 1990s, the physical connection between Cas OB14 and LDN 1287 is supported by the fact that the stellar wind from the four giants, particularly κ Cassiopeiae, the brightest, is likely the primary trigger for star formation within the cloud. It has also been hypothesized that LDN 1287 and LDN 1293 are part of a giant filamentary molecular system extending from Cas OB14 to Cep OB4.

== Regions in the Perseus Arm ==
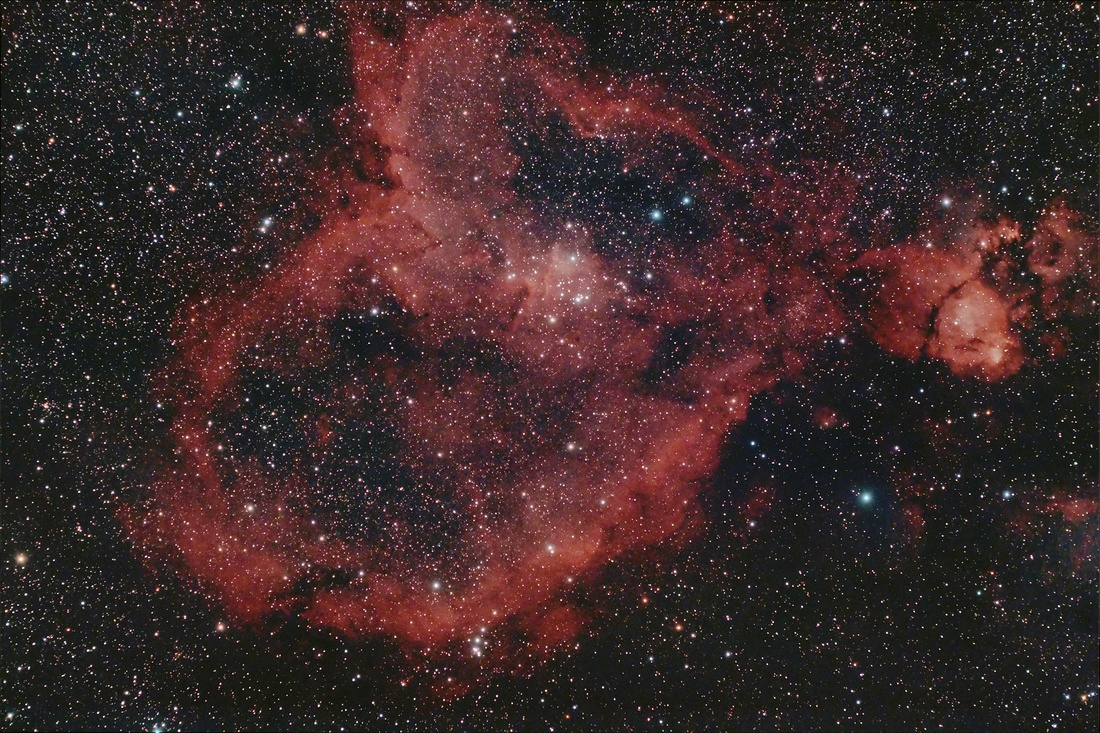
IC 1805, also known as the Heart Nebula, is a large cloud in the Perseus Arm where star formation is active.

Beyond the outer edge of the Orion Arm, there extends a vast region with fewer bright stars and interstellar gas, an intermediate area between two spiral arms; beyond this space, at approximately 2100 parsecs (6800 light-years), lies the Perseus Arm, one of the two major spiral arms of our Galaxy. Many non-stellar astronomical objects observable between the constellations of Cassiopeia and Auriga actually belong to this major arm, such as M37 and the Double Cluster in Perseus. Specifically, in the direction of Cassiopeia, the open clusters NGC 457, NGC 663, and NGC 7789 belong to this arm.

The sector of the Perseus Arm in the direction of Cassiopeia features several large star-forming regions and multiple OB associations composed of highly luminous stars. A well-studied nebular structure is LDN 1238, located at 2200–2500 parsecs; this cloud is well-known in astronomical circles because it contains a notable pre-main-sequence star known as MWC 1080. This Herbig Ae/Be star, of spectral class B0 (a blue and very hot star), is part of a multiple star system, where the primary, itself an eclipsing binary, is separated from an infrared-visible companion by 0.75"; it also exhibits strong X-ray emission (hence the "Be" designation in its spectrum) and is surrounded by a small cluster of infrared sources within a 0.7-parsec radius. MWC 1080 is associated with a jet cataloged as HH 170, discovered in 1992; it extends east of the star with a very high radial velocity, reaching 400 km/s along the flow line.

One of the largest star-forming regions in the Perseus Arm visible toward Cassiopeia is the Heart and Soul Nebula region, located in the easternmost part of the constellation near the border with Camelopardalis and Perseus; the nebular complexes where new stars are forming are also known among amateur astronomers as IC 1805 (Heart Nebula) and IC 1848 (Soul Nebula). This large complex is associated with several well-known open clusters, including the famous Double Cluster, and two large OB associations, known as Cassiopeia OB6 and Perseus OB1.

=== OB Associations ===
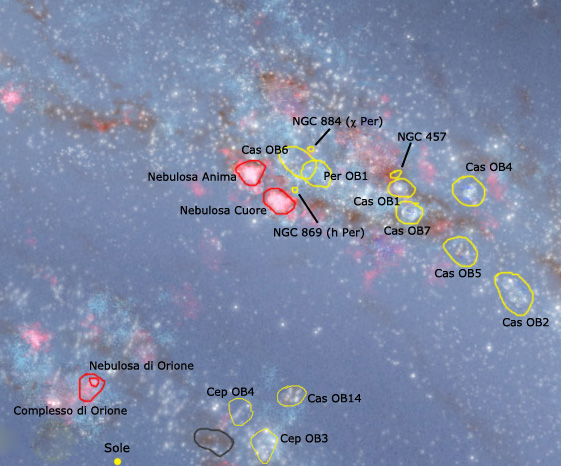
Schematic map showing the galactic region between the Orion Arm and the Perseus Arm. The Sun is at the bottom left.

As a direct result of the intense, large-scale star formation processes occurring in the Perseus Arm, a series of OB associations exist, some of which are very extensive and luminous. The first comprehensive study of the brightest stars belonging to these associations, located at 2000 parsecs, was published in 1978; subsequent years saw investigations into the member stars of these associations through their placement on the HR diagram. The main associations are Cassiopeia OB1, Cassiopeia OB2, Cassiopeia OB5, Cassiopeia OB6, Cassiopeia OB7, and Cassiopeia OB8.

==== Cassiopeia OB1 ====
Cassiopeia OB1 is a small OB association formed by four giant stars of spectral class B with apparent magnitudes between the eighth and ninth, located at galactic coordinates l=122–125° and b=−(1–3)°; it appears to interact with several small nebular regions. It is located in the direction of the open cluster NGC 457, with which it shares a similar distance from Earth.

==== Cassiopeia OB2 ====
Cassiopeia OB2 is situated in a very dense region of its spiral arm; it contains about twenty blue giants and blue supergiants of spectral class B and two of class O, plus, possibly, some very young Wolf-Rayet stars, though it is unclear whether it forms a true association or if its components are at different distances without constituting a proper association. It is located at galactic coordinates l=108–115° and b=-2.5–+2° (straddling the galactic equator), in the line of sight of open clusters like NGC 7510 and NGC 7654; surrounding Cas OB2 is an extensive nebular complex, including the ring nebula cataloged as Sh2-157 and a young open cluster known as Mrk 50 (Basel 3). The ring shape of the nebula is caused by the action of stellar winds from several giant stars, while the southern sector appears excited by the luminous radiation of class O stars. Among the association's members is a Cepheid variable, cataloged as SU Cassiopeiae: this star is known for its peculiar pulsations, suggesting it has not crossed the instability strip for the first time, making it challenging to study both its evolution and its membership in the association. The metallicity of its components is relatively similar to that of the Sun, particularly for two stars (HD 17327b and HD 17443) known for their high rotational velocities.

==== Cassiopeia OB5 ====
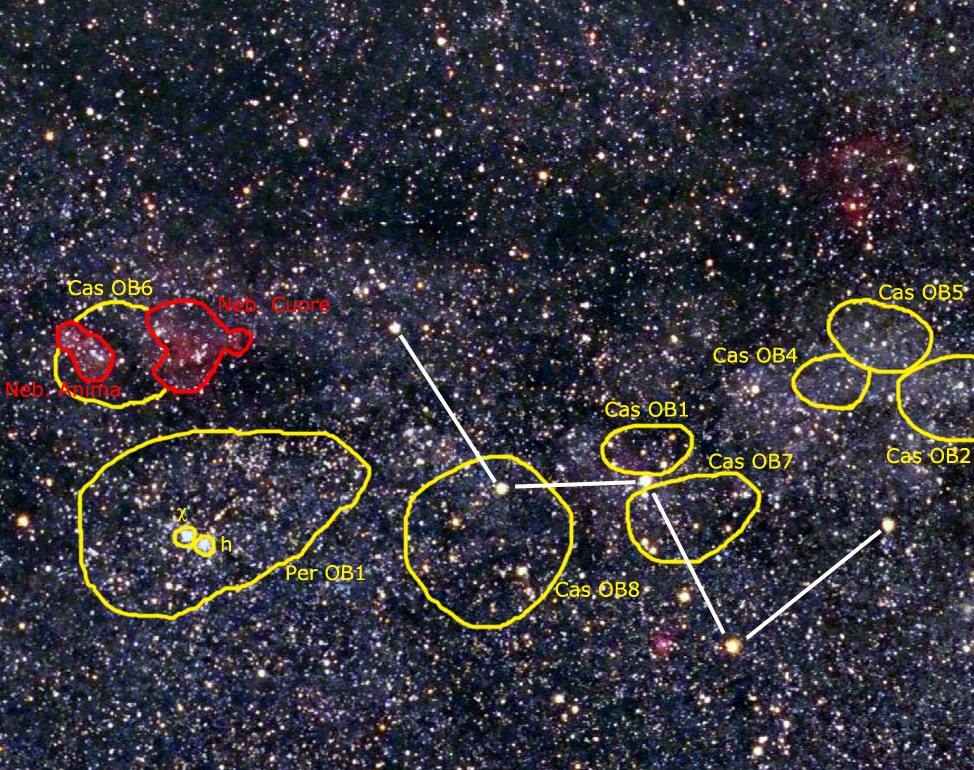
Mapped image of the constellation Cassiopeia, highlighting the structures of the complex in the Perseus Arm; information is drawn from the publication The space distribution and kinematics of supergiants.

Cassiopeia OB5 consists of about forty stars at the heart of the Perseus Arm. The association's distance is estimated by most researchers at around 2200 parsecs; however, a 2007 study places this complex at approximately 3100 parsecs. Among its main stars is one at the limit of naked-eye visibility, 6 Cassiopeiae: a supergiant star in an intermediate phase between blue supergiant and yellow supergiant; its age is estimated at 6.4 million years, and its distance at 8100 light-years, or about 2500 parsecs. A study focused on identifying neutral hydrogen masses at various wavelengths revealed a vast superbubble encompassing the entire OB association: its radius is estimated at 190 parsecs, with an expansion velocity of about 2 km/s; it is suspected that such an extensive bubble is not the result of a single supernova explosion, whose shock wave would clear the surrounding gas, but rather the cumulative effect of the stellar wind from the association's stars.

==== Cassiopeia OB6 ====
Cassiopeia OB6 is a vast and bright OB association; it spans several hundred light-years and encompasses various objects, such as the Heart and Soul nebulae, the open clusters associated with IC 1805 and IC 1848, the cloud IC 1795, Sh2-196, and Sh2-201, and the supernova remnant HB 3, a giant envelope of gas and dust. The connection between these objects was first hypothesized in the 1950s, when the existence of an association of young, hot stars exciting the region's gas was theorized; observations of large neutral hydrogen shells near these hot stars suggested interaction with the local interstellar medium. Cas OB6 also appears related to one of the most extensive and brightest OB associations in our Galaxy, Perseus OB1, which includes the stars of the Double Cluster. The formation of the bright stars currently observable began in the IC 1805 region about three million years ago; this age was determined through the distribution of the stars on the HR diagram. Approximately three million years is also the expansion time of the W4 gaseous envelope, which has a radius of 35 parsecs, suggesting a comparable age to the association; the HB3 bubble, however, is thought to have been caused by a supernova explosion within Cas OB6, which is much younger, and its effect on the surrounding neutral hydrogen clouds is significantly less than that of W4.

==== Cassiopeia OB7 ====
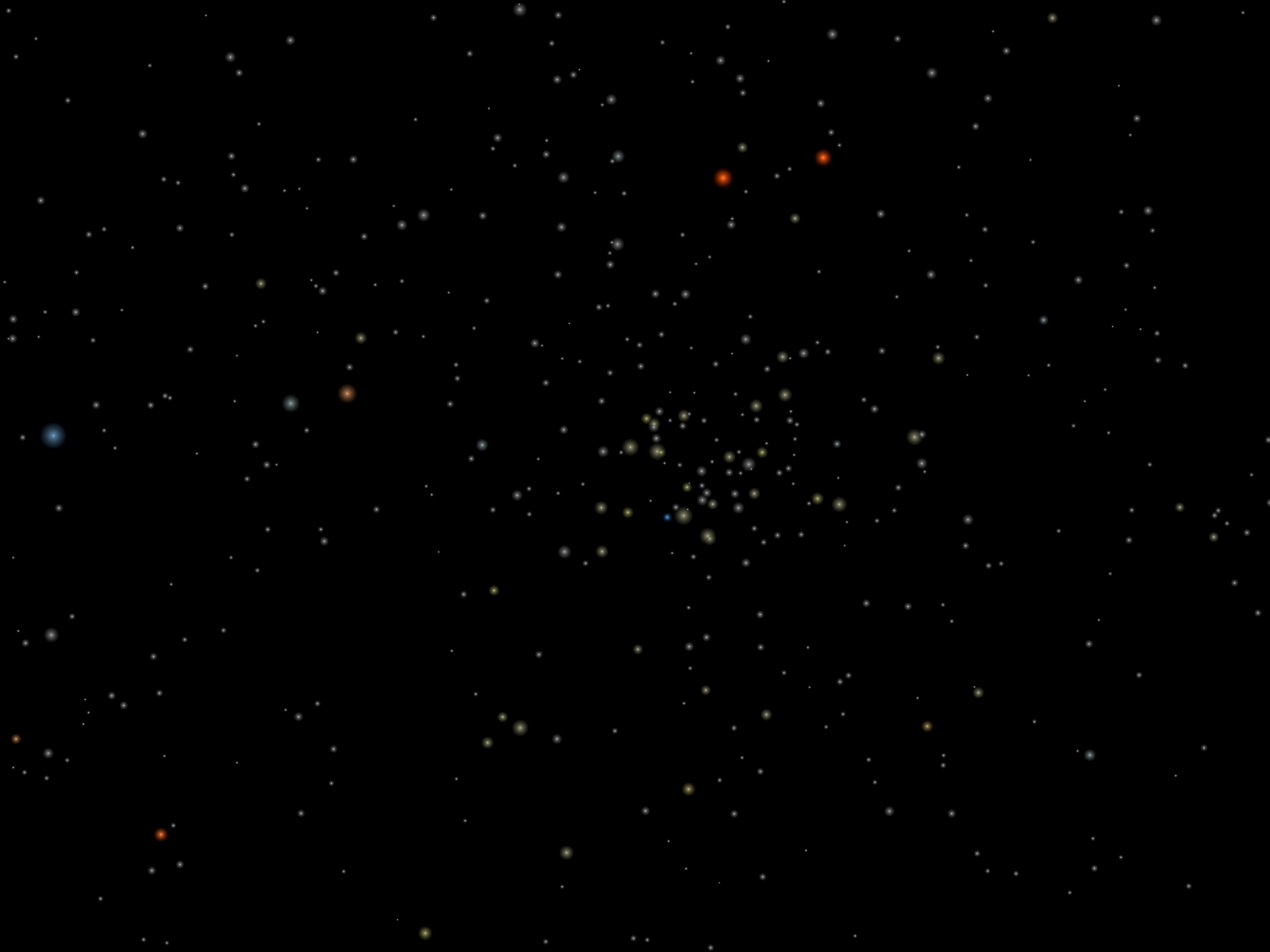
NGC 663, an open cluster part of the Cas OB8 association.

Cassiopeia OB7 is a very extensive association located at galactic coordinates l=123° and b=+1°, though, given its size, it is not particularly rich in massive stars: it includes about thirty supergiant stars of spectral class O and B; it is also a relatively understudied object. The association is located on the inner edge of the Perseus Arm, and the entire region is connected to an expanding superbubble, which the stellar wind of Cas OB7 pushes toward the intermediate sector between its host arm and ours. It is believed that the stellar distribution of Cas OB7 was disrupted by a supernova explosion, which altered the radial velocity of the nearest stars, some of which, like HD 5689, have become runaway stars escaping the association. The interaction of the stellar wind with the surrounding interstellar medium may also have triggered a series of sequential star formation events, as evidenced by the presence of some young stellar objects and T Tauri stars.

== Cassiopeia OB8 ==
Cassiopeia OB8 extends toward the central sector of the constellation Cassiopeia; with an estimated distance of about 2600 parsecs (8500 light-years), it is located in the Perseus Arm between Cas OB1 and Per OB1. Several of its member stars are easily observable with a small binocular, and it encompasses some of the most famous open clusters in Cassiopeia, such as M103, NGC 663, NGC 654, and NGC 659. The age of Cas OB8 is estimated at 20–25 million years, making it older than other nearby associations; it contains about fifteen extremely luminous and hot supergiant stars, some of which are part of the aforementioned clusters, reaching apparent magnitudes of sixth and seventh.

== See also ==
- Cassiopeia (constellation)
- Orion Arm
- Perseus Arm
- Heart Nebula
- Soul Nebula
- Orion molecular cloud complex
- OB association
- Star formation
- Giant molecular cloud
- H I region
- H II region
- Superbubble
- Star-forming regions of Auriga

== Bibliography ==
=== General texts ===
- O'Meara, Stephen James (2007). Deep Sky Companions: Hidden Treasures. Cambridge University Press. ISBN 978-0-521-83704-0.
- Robert Burnham, Jr (1978). Burnham's Celestial Handbook: Volume Two. New York: Dover Publications, Inc.
- Chaisson, E.; McMillan, S. (1993). Astronomy Today. Englewood Cliffs: Prentice-Hall, Inc. ISBN 0-13-240085-5.
- Arny, Thomas T. (2007). Explorations: An Introduction to Astronomy (3 updated ed.). Boston: McGraw-Hill. ISBN 978-0-07-321369-9.
- AA.VV (2002). L'Universo - Grande enciclopedia dell'astronomia [The Universe - Great Encyclopedia of Astronomy] (in Italian). Novara: De Agostini.
- Gribbin, J. (2005). Enciclopedia di astronomia e cosmologia [Encyclopedia of Astronomy and Cosmology] (in Italian). Milano: Garzanti. ISBN 88-11-50517-8.
- Owen, W. (2006). Atlante illustrato dell'Universo [Illustrated Atlas of the Universe] (in Italian). Milano: Il Viaggiatore. ISBN 88-365-3679-4.
- Lindstrom, J. (2006). Stelle, galassie e misteri cosmici [Stars, Galaxies, and Cosmic Mysteries] (in Italian). Trieste: Editoriale Scienza. ISBN 88-7307-326-3.

=== Specific texts ===
==== On stellar evolution ====
- Lada, C. J.; N. D. Kylafits (1999). The Origin of Stars and Planetary Systems. Kluwer Academic Publishers. ISBN 0-7923-5909-7.
- De Blasi, A. (2002). Le stelle: nascita, evoluzione e morte [The Stars: Birth, Evolution, and Death] (in Italian). Bologna: CLUEB. ISBN 88-491-1832-5.
- Abbondi, C. (2007). Universo in evoluzione dalla nascita alla morte delle stelle [Evolving Universe from the Birth to the Death of Stars] (in Italian). Sandit. ISBN 978-88-89150-32-0.
- Hack, M. (2004). Dove nascono le stelle. Dalla vita ai quark: un viaggio a ritroso alle origini dell'Universo [Where Stars Are Born. From Life to Quarks: A Journey Back to the Origins of the Universe] (in Italian). Milano: Sperling & Kupfer. ISBN 88-8274-912-6.

==== On Cassiopeia regions ====
- Mária Kun (2008). Star Forming Regions in Cassiopeia (pdf). Vol. 1. Handbook of Star Forming Regions, Volume I: The Northern Sky ASP Monograph Publications, Bo Reipurth. p. 24. Bibcode:2008hsf1.book..240K. ISBN 978-1-58381-670-7.

=== Star charts ===
- Tirion, W.; Rappaport, B.; Lovi, G. (1987). Uranometria 2000.0 - Volume I - The Northern Hemisphere to -6°. Richmond, Virginia, USA: Willmann-Bell, inc. ISBN 0-943396-14-X.
- Tirion, W.; Sinnott, R. (1998). Sky Atlas 2000.0 (2 ed.). Cambridge, USA: Cambridge University Press. ISBN 0-933346-90-5.
- Tirion, W. (2001). The Cambridge Star Atlas 2000.0 (3 ed.). Cambridge, USA: Cambridge University Press. ISBN 0-521-80084-6.

=== Scientific publications ===
- Lynds, Beverly T. (1962). "Catalogue of Dark Nebulae". Astrophysical Journal Supplement. 7: 1. Bibcode:1962ApJS....7....1L. doi:10.1086/190072.
- Heiles, Carl (1967). "Observations of the Spatial Structure of Interstellar Hydrogen. I. High-Resolution Observations of a Small Region". Astrophysical Journal Supplement. 15: 97. Bibcode:1967ApJS...15...97H. doi:10.1086/190164.
- Humphreys, R. M. (1970). "The space distribution and kinematics of supergiants". Astronomical Journal. 75 (602): 602. Bibcode:1970AJ.....75..602H. doi:10.1086/110995.
- Humphreys, R. M. (1978). "Studies of luminous stars in nearby galaxies. I. Supergiants and O stars in the Milky Way". Astrophysical Journal Supplement Series. 38: 309–350. Bibcode:1978ApJS...38..309H. doi:10.1086/190559.
- Braunsfurth, E. (1983). "Neutral hydrogen in the CAS OB6 association". Astronomy and Astrophysics. 117 (2): 297–304. Bibcode:1983A&A...117..297B.
- Canto, J.; Rodriguez, L. F.; Calvet, N.; Levreault, R. M. (1984). "Stellar winds and molecular clouds – Herbig Be and AE type stars". Astrophysical Journal. 282: 631–640. Bibcode:1984ApJ...282..631C. doi:10.1086/162242.
- Strom, K. M.; Strom, S. E.; Wolff, S. C.; Morgan, J.; Wenz, M. (1986). "Optical manifestations of mass outflows from young stars - At atlas of CCD images of Herbig-Haro objects". Astrophysical Journal Supplement Series. 62: 39–80. Bibcode:1986ApJS...62...39S. doi:10.1086/191133.
- Dame, T. M.; Ungerechts, H.; Cohen, R. S.; de Geus, E. J.; Grenier, I. A.; May, J.; Murphy, D. C.; Nyman, L.-A.; Thaddeus, P. (1987). "A composite CO survey of the entire Milky Way". Astrophysical Journal. 322: 706–720. Bibcode:1987ApJ...322..706D. doi:10.1086/165766. hdl:1887/6534.
- Grenier, I. A.; Lebrun, F.; Arnaud, M.; Dame, T. M.; Thaddeus, P. (1989). "CO observations of the Cepheus flare. I - Molecular clouds associated with a nearby bubble". Astrophysical Journal. 347: 231–239. Bibcode:1989ApJ...347..231G. doi:10.1086/168112.
- Lattanzi, Mario G.; Massone, Giuseppe; Munari, Ulisse (1991). "Memberships and CM diagrams of young open clusters. I - NGC 225". Astronomical Journal. 102: 177–199. Bibcode:1991AJ....102..177L. doi:10.1086/115865.
- Joncas, G.; Durand, D.; Roger, R. S. (1992). "The Sharpless 187 gas complex - A multifrequency study". Astrophysical Journal. 387: 591–611. Bibcode:1992ApJ...387..591J. doi:10.1086/171109.
- Poetzel, R.; Mundt, R.; Ray, T. P. (1992). "Herbig-Haro outflows associated with high-luminosity young stellar objects - AFGL 2591 and MWC 1080". Astronomy and Astrophysics. 262: 229–247. Bibcode:1992A&A...262..229P.
- Garmany, C. D.; Stencel, R. E. (1992). "Galactic OB associations in the northern Milky Way Galaxy. I – Longitudes 55 deg to 150 deg". Astronomy and Astrophysics Supplement Series. 94 (2): 211–244. Bibcode:1992A&AS...94..211G.
- Kenyon, Scott J.; Hartmann, Lee; Gomez, Mercedes; Carr, John S.; Tokunaga, Alan (1993). "RNO 1B/1C – A double FU Orionis system". Astronomical Journal. 105 (4): 1505–1510. Bibcode:1993AJ....105.1505K. doi:10.1086/116529.
- Lagage, P. O.; Olofsson, G.; Cabrit, S.; Cesarsky, C. J.; Nordh, L.; Rodriguez Espinosa, J. M. (1993). "A Deeply Embedded Companion to LkH alpha 198". Astrophysical Journal Letters. 417: L79. Bibcode:1993ApJ...417L..79L. doi:10.1086/187099.
- Zavagno, A.; Deharveng, L.; Caplan, J. (1994). "A new young stellar object in the S 187 complex: Photometry and spectroscopy". Astronomy and Astrophysics. 281 (2): 491–504. Bibcode:1994A&A...281..491Z.
- Kun, M.; Obayashi, A.; Sato, F.; Yonekura, Y.; Fukui, Y.; Balazs, L. G.; Abraham, P.; Szabados, L.; Kelemen, J. (1994). "Study of L 1340: A star-forming cloud in Cassiopeia". Astronomy and Astrophysics. 292 (1): 249–260. Bibcode:1994A&A...292..249K.
- Obayashi, Ayano; Kun, Mária; Sato, Fumio; Yonekura, Yoshinori; Fukui, Yasuo (1998). "Star formation in the L1333 molecular cloud in Cassiopeia". Astronomical Journal. 115 (1): 274. Bibcode:1998AJ....115..274O. doi:10.1086/300172.
- de Zeeuw, P. T.; Hoogerwerf, R.; de Bruijne, J. H. J.; Brown, A. G. A.; Blaauw, A. (1999). "A HIPPARCOS Census of the Nearby OB Associations". The Astronomical Journal. 117 (1): 354–399. arXiv:astro-ph/9809227. Bibcode:1999AJ....117..354D. doi:10.1086/300682.
- Murdin, P. (2000). "M103". The Encyclopedia of Astronomy and Astrophysics. Encyclopedia of Astronomy and Astrophysics, Edited by Paul Murdin, Article 6103. Bristol: Institute of Physics Publishing. Bibcode:2000eaa..bookE6103.. doi:10.1888/0333750888/6103. ISBN 0-333-75088-8.
- Usenko, I. A.; Kovtyukh, V. V.; Klochkova, V. G.; Panchuk, V. E.; Yermakov, S. V. (2001). "Spectroscopic investigations of classical Cepheids and main-sequence stars in galactic open clusters and associations. I. Association Cas OB2 and the small-amplitude Cepheid SU Cassiopeae". Astronomy and Astrophysics. 367 (3): 831–839. Bibcode:2001A&A...367..831U. doi:10.1051/0004-6361:20000531.
- Nanda Kumar, M. S.; Anandarao, B. G.; Yu, Ka Chun (2002). "Ongoing Star Formation Activity in the L1340 Dark Cloud". The Astronomical Journal. 123 (5): 2583–2589. Bibcode:2002AJ....123.2583N. doi:10.1086/339966.
- Cazzolato, F.; Pineault, A. (2002). "Cas OB7 and its Surrounding ISM". Seeing Through the Dust: The Detection of HI and the Exploration of the ISM in Galaxies, ASP Conference Proceedings. 276: 312. Bibcode:2002ASPC..276..312C. ISBN 1-58381-118-4.
- Moór, A.; Kiss, Cs. (2003). "Multiwavelength Study of the Cas OB5 Supershell". Communications of the Konkoly Observatory, Hungary Proceedings of the conference: 'The interaction of stars with their environment II.', held at the Eötvös Loránd University, Budapest, Hungary. 103: 149–152. Bibcode:2003CoKon.103..149M.
- Cazzolato, F.; Pineault, A. (2003). "Large-Scale Structure and Dynamics of Cassiopeia OB7". The Astronomical Journal. 125 (4): 2050–2063. Bibcode:2003AJ....125.2050C. doi:10.1086/368242.
- Dobashi, Kazuhito; Uehara, Hayato; Kandori, Ryo; Sakurai, Tohko; Kaiden, Masahiro; Umemoto, Tomofumi; Sato, Fumio (2005). "Atlas and Catalog of Dark Clouds Based on Digitized Sky Survey I". Publications of the Astronomical Society of Japan. 57 (SP1): S1–S368. Bibcode:2005PASJ...57S...1D. doi:10.1093/pasj/57.sp1.S1.
- Olano, C. A.; Meschin, P. I.; Niemela, V. S. (2006). "The interstellar medium in the Upper Cepheus-Cassiopeia region". Monthly Notices of the Royal Astronomical Society. 369 (2): 867–874. Bibcode:2006MNRAS.369..867O. doi:10.1111/j.1365-2966.2006.10343.x.
- Russeil, D.; Adami, C.; Georgelin, Y. M. (2007). "Revised distances of Northern HII regions". Astronomy and Astrophysics. 470 (1): 161–171. Bibcode:2007A&A...470..161R. doi:10.1051/0004-6361:20066051.
- Megeath, S. T.; Townsley, L. K.; Oey, M. S.; Tieftrunk, A. R. (2008). Low and High Mass Star Formation in the W3, W4, and W5 Regions (pdf). Vol. 1. Handbook of Star Forming Regions, Volume I: The Northern Sky ASP Monograph Publications, Bo Reipurth. p. 24. Bibcode:2008hsf1.book..264M. ISBN 978-1-58381-670-7.
