= NGC 7788 =

Open Cluster in the constellation Cassiopeia

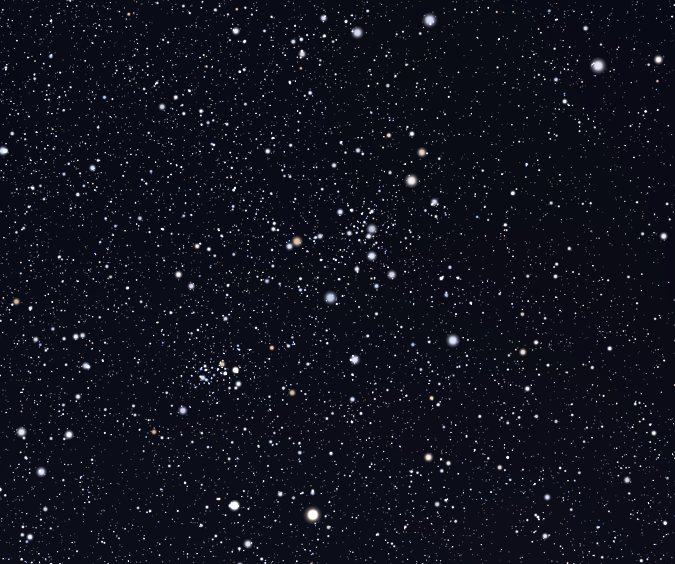
- NGC 7788

Observation data (J2000 epoch)
- Right ascension: 23^{h} 56^{m} 43.0^{s}
- Declination: +61° 23′ 42″
- Distance: (2.29 kiloparsecs)
- Apparent magnitude (V): 9.4

Physical characteristics
- Mass: 840 ± 110 M_{☉}
- Estimated age: 10-15 million years
- Other designations: OCISM 59, OCl 275, GC 5030, JH 2283

Associations
- Constellation: Cassiopeia
- Galaxy: Milky Way

NGC 7788 is an open star cluster in the constellation Cassiopeia. It was discovered on October 5, 1829 by John Herschel. John Louis Emil Dreyer noted NGC 7788 as a cluster, small, pretty rich, very compressed, stars of 10th magnitude and from 13th magnitude. NGC 7788 is part of star-forming regions of Cassiopeia specifically Cas OB5, along with other clusters like King 12 and NGC 7790. NGC 7788 and NGC 7790 are separated by 17 arcminutes (0.28 degrees).

== Properties ==
NGC 7788 has an E(B−V) of 0.28 and an age of approximately 1.58 × 10^{7} years. Another estimate of NGC 7788's age is approximately 6 × 10^{6} years and found NGC 7788 to consist of 246 members, with a metallicity relative to the Sun ([Fe/H]) of +0.50 dex. Based on BVR_{c}I_{c} CCD photometry, NGC 7788's age estimate is 160 million years. Analysis also found that NGC 7788 has a gap in its main sequence (1.5–1.7 solar masses). In 1965, 57 members were identified in NGC 7788 with magnitude V, with the brightest at 9.49 mag and the dimmest at 15.90 mag. In another paper, NGC 7788 has an estimated age of 13.2 million years.

A study found that NGC 7788 has a stellar halo that extends out to a radius of 5 arcmin (approximately 3.4 parsecs). The formation of this halo was possibly caused by large-scale mass ejection early in the evolution of the clusters, as predicted by models.

== Characteristics ==
NGC 7788 has a proper motion in right ascension of −0.1 ± 1.6 mas yr^{-1} and a proper motion in declination of −6.4 ± 1.3 mas yr^{-1}. While another survey using Star cluster Hunting Pipeline (SHiP) found that NGC 7788 has a stellar parallax of 0.289 ± 0.037 mas, a proper motion in right ascension of -3.061 ± 0.350 mas yr^{-1} and a proper motion in declination of -1.589 ± 0.344 mas yr^{-1}.

NGC 7788, NGC 7790 and Berkeley 58

== Members and Environment ==
NGC 7788 has two OB-type stars, one B0V type star, one B1V star, one B2V star and one B5III star. Besides that, NGC 7788 has two eclipsing binaries and one RS CVn variable. In NGC 7788, astronomers only found one evolved star (BD +60°2644), while the other cluster members are dwarf stars sitting near the ZAMS (Zero-Age Main Sequence).

Within 2 arcminutes of NGC 7788, there is a farther Delta Scuti variable known as ZTF J235643.90+612446.7 (distance 3018.41 pc), three BY Draconis variables and a stellar association known as Theia 904. NGC 7788 is likely unrelated and lies in the foreground of the binary cluster NGC 7790 and Berkeley 58.
