= HD 197911 =

Star in the constellation Cepheus

- Location of HD 197911 (circled)

Observation data Epoch J2000 Equinox J2000
- Constellation: Cepheus
- Right ascension: 20^{h} 43^{m} 21.60554^{s}
- Declination: +63° 12′ 32.8418″
- Apparent magnitude (V): 7.669

Characteristics
- Spectral type: B2V
- B−V color index: +0.065

Astrometry
Radial velocity (R_{v})	−3.80±3.5 km/s
Proper motion (μ)	RA: −13.478 mas/yr Dec.: −3.025 mas/yr
Parallax (π)	1.0802±0.0214 mas
Distance	3,020 ± 60 ly (930 ± 20 pc)
Absolute magnitude (M_{V})	−2.73

Details
Mass	8.7 M_{☉}
Radius	9.218±0.461 R_{☉}
Luminosity	5,458 L_{☉}
Surface gravity (log g)	3.99 cgs
Temperature	21,727 K
Rotational velocity (v sin i)	95.4 km/s

Other designations
- AG+63°1129, BD+62°1854, GC 28915, HD 197911, HIP 102274, SAO 19003, PPM 22349, TIC 343565408, TYC 4250-1529-1, GSC 04250-01529, 2MASS J20432160+6312329, Gaia DR3 2196984971452315392

Database references
SIMBAD	HD 197911

HD 197911 (HIP 102274) is a bluish-white hued star in the deep northern constellation of Cepheus, close to the border with Draco and Cygnus. With an apparent magnitude of 7.669, it is too faint to be seen by the naked eye under most conditions, but readily visible using binoculars. The star is located some 3,020 light-years (930 parsecs) distant according to Gaia EDR3 parallax measurements, but is moving closer to the Solar System at a heliocentric radial velocity of −3.8±3.5 km/s.

The star appears close to the reflection nebula and H II region Sh2-130, alongside the A0-type star HD 197809 and G5-type star SAO 18999, though the latter two stars are located much closer to Earth at 469 ly (144 pc) and 198 ly (61 pc), respectively. The nebula itself is situated at a distance of 600 pc (2,000 ly).

== Properties and origin ==
HD 197911 is a massive B-type star with the spectral type B2V, a mass 8.7 times that of the Sun and 9.2 times its radius. It is a runaway star traversing space at a peculiar velocity of 56.69 km/s. The star is thought to have once been part of a binary system, from which it was ejected as its companion ended its life in a supernova.

Initially, the star was thought to have originated in an OB association called the Cepheus OB2 association, which it left 2–3 million years ago, when the association was 3–4 million years old. This aligned with the age of the Cepheus bubble, an annular structure of infrared emission, providing compelling evidence for the binary-supernova scenario, that is, that it was blasted out of a binary system by a companion going supernova.

However, with updated astrometric data, it is now considered more likely that it formed in either Alessi-Teutsch 5 or NGC 7160, two star clusters that are each 12.5 and 9.0 million years old. Both origins are consistent with the initially proposed scenario.
