= OB association =

Group of OB stars

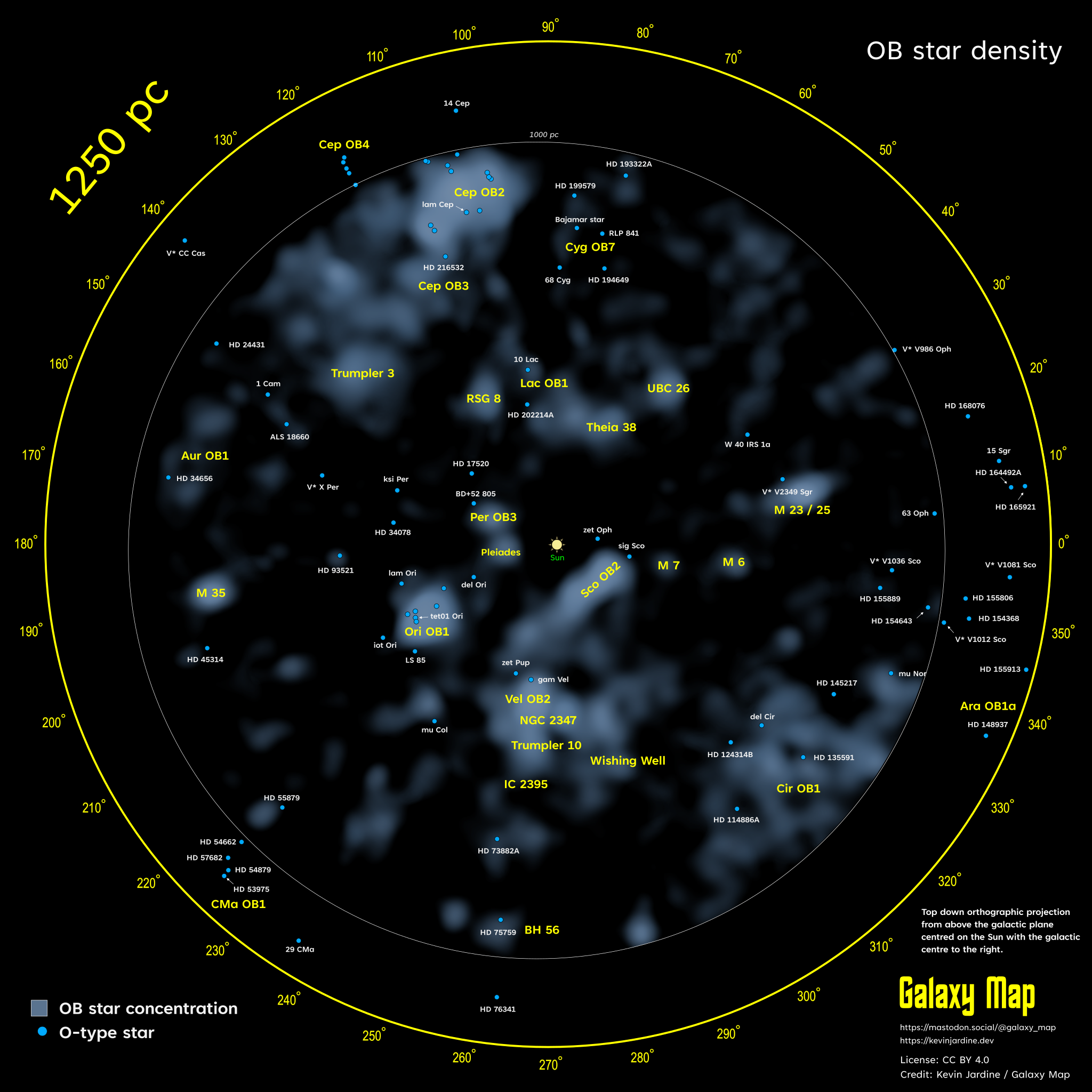
OB stars within 1250 pc (Quintana)

An OB association is a loosely organized, gravitationally unbound group of young, massive, main sequence stars primarily of spectral types O and B, characterized by their high temperatures, blue color, and luminosity, and by the presence of massive stars with masses between 10 and 90 times that of the Sun. Sometimes these late O and early B stars are referred to as OB stars. These associations typically contain 10 to 100 (or more) massive stars alongside numerous lower-mass stars, all sharing common motion vectors, ages, and chemical compositions, indicating a shared origin. Unlike denser star clusters, OB associations lack sufficient gravitational binding and can disperse over millions of years.

== History ==
The concept of stellar associations, including OB associations, was introduced by Armenian astronomer Victor Ambartsumian in 1947. He distinguished them from bound clusters, categorizing them into OB associations (for O and B-type stars) and T associations (for cooler, variable T Tauri stars). Since their identification, OB associations have been observed not only in the Milky Way but also in nearby galaxies, contributing significantly to studies of galactic star formation.

== Formation and characteristics ==
OB associations form within giant molecular clouds, where dense regions of gas and dust collapse under gravity to produce stars. The massive O and B stars form in a relatively small volume, but stellar winds, radiation pressure, and supernovae from these stars expel surrounding gas, reducing gravitational cohesion and causing the group to expand as an unbound system. This process results in lower star formation efficiency compared to bound clusters, contributing to their dispersed nature.

OB associations are notably sparse, often spanning 700 to 1,500 light-years in diameter, and are visually distinct from compact clusters. They are typically very young, with ages of a few million years, as O-type stars have lifespans of 1 to 15 million years, while B-type stars last somewhat longer due to their rapid nuclear fuel consumption. These associations are often found in the spiral arms of galaxies like the Milky Way and are associated with nearby open star clusters. The massive stars within them are extremely luminous, up to 100,000 times brighter than the Sun, and frequently end their lives as supernovae.

== Table ==
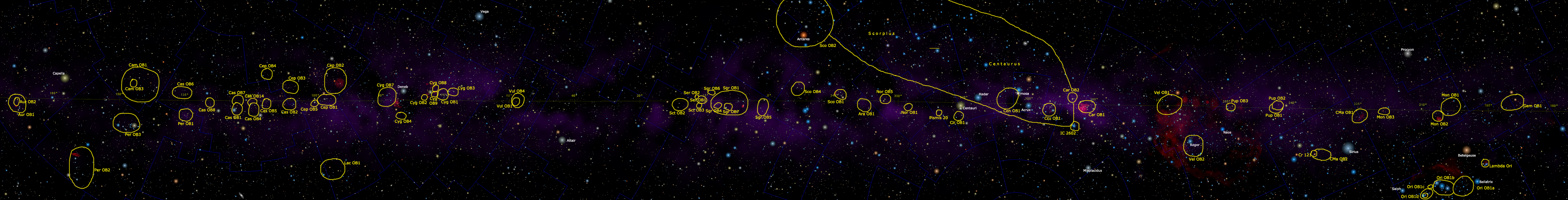
Map showing OB association in Milky Way

| Name | RA DEC | Constellation | Distance (Ly) | Notes | | | | |
|---|---|---|---|---|---|---|---|---|
| Name | RA DEC | Constellation | Distance (Ly) | Notes | Ara OB1 | 16^{h} 39^{m} 30.00^{s} −46° 45′ 60.0″ | Ara | 4,560 |
| Auriga OB1 | 05^{h} 21^{m} 43.88^{s} +33° 51′ 23.9″ | Auriga | 5,700 | | | | | |
| Auriga OB2 | 05^{h} 28^{m} 16.64^{s} +34° 53′ 37.8″ | Auriga | 20,540 | | | | | |
| Camelopardalis OB1 | 03^{h} 31^{m} 36.00^{s} +58° 37′ 60.0″ | Camelopardalis | 3,300 | | | | | |
| Camelopardalis OB3 | 03^{h} 31^{m} 36.00^{s} +58° 37′ 60.0″ | Camelopardalis | 13,000 | | | | | |
| Canis Major OB1 | 07^{h} 06^{m} 60.00^{s} −10° 28′ 0.0″ | Canis Major | 3,260 | | | | | |
| Canis Major OB2 | —N/a | Canis Major | 1,920 | | | | | |
| Carina OB1 | 10^{h} 37^{m} 60.00^{s} −58° 59′ 60.0″ | Carina | 8,700 | | | | | |
| Carina OB2 | 11^{h} 07^{m} 60.00^{s} −60° 12′ 0.0″ | Carina | 7,200 | | | | | |
| Cassiopeia OB1 | 01^{h} 00^{m} 22.63^{s} +61° 27′ 11.6″ | Cassiopeia | 6,500 | | | | | |
| Cassiopeia OB2 | 23^{h} 19^{m} 60.00^{s} +60° 53′ 60.0″ | Cassiopeia | 11,050 | | | | | |
| Cassiopeia OB4 | 00^{h} 27^{m} 0.00^{s} +62° 23′ 60.0″ | Cassiopeia | 7,800 | | | | | |
| Cassiopeia OB5 | 23^{h} 53^{m} 60.00^{s} +61° 36′ 0.0″ | Cassiopeia | 7,200 | | | | | |
| Cassiopeia OB6 | 02^{h} 42^{m} 57.93^{s} +61° 19′ 53.8″ | Cassiopeia | 6,800 | | | | | |
| Cassiopeia OB7 | 00^{h} 50^{m} 14.00^{s} +64° 04′ 18.0″ | Cassiopeia | 6,500 | | | | | |
| Cassiopeia OB8 | 01^{h} 44^{m} 0.00^{s} +61° 06′ 0.0″ | Cassiopeia | 8,500 | | | | | |
| Cassiopeia OB14 | 00^{h} 29^{m} 0.00^{s} +63° 29′ 60.0″ | Cassiopeia | 3,600 | | | | | |
| Centaurus OB1 | 13^{h} 01^{m} 60.00^{s} −61° 23′ 60.0″ | Centaurus | 7,820 | | | | | |
| Cepheus OB1 | 22^{h} 29^{m} 0.00^{s} +56 36° 0.0′ | Cepheus | 11,400 | | | | | |
| Cepheus OB2 | 21^{h} 51^{m} 0.00^{s} +60° 00′ 0.0″ | Cepheus | 2,900 | | | | | |
| Cepheus OB3 | 23^{h} 04^{m} 12.00^{s} +63° 23′ 60.0″ | Cepheus | 2,350 | | | | | |
| Cepheus OB4 | 00^{h} 01^{m} 60.00^{s} +67° 42′ 0.0″ | Cepheus | 2,755 | | | | | |
| Cepheus OB5 | 23^{h} 02^{m} 16.08^{s} +57° 01′ 19.2″ | Cepheus | 6,850 | | | | | |
| Cepheus OB6 | 22^{h} 30^{m} 0.00^{s} +58° 00′ 0.0″ | Cepheus | 880 | | | | | |
| Circinus OB1 | 14^{h} 45^{m} 0.00^{s} −62° 53′ 60.0″ | Circinus | 10,700 | | | | | |
| Crux OB1 | 11^{h} 39^{m} 60.00^{s} −62° 53′ 60.0″ | Crux | 8,150 | | | | | |

=== Scorpius-Centaurus association ===
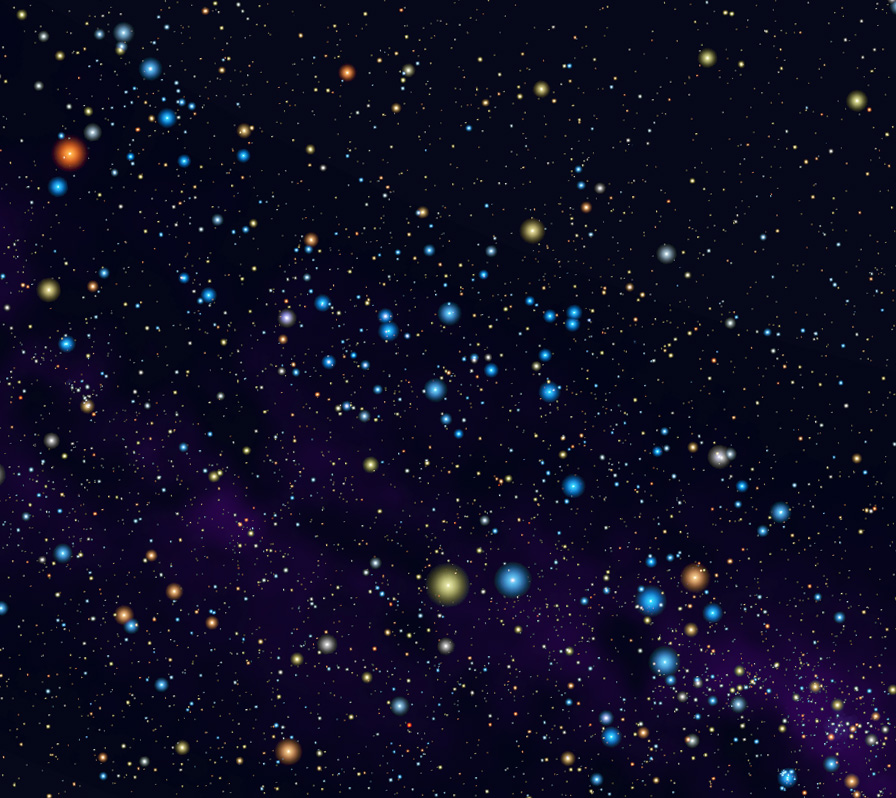
Image showing stars in Scorpius–Centaurus association

Scorpius-Centaurus association: It is the closest OB association to Earth, located approximately 400 light-years away, Containing bright stars in the constellations of Scorpius, Centaurus, Lupus, and Crux, including one of the nearest red supergiant to Earth, Antares.

=== Orion OB1 association ===
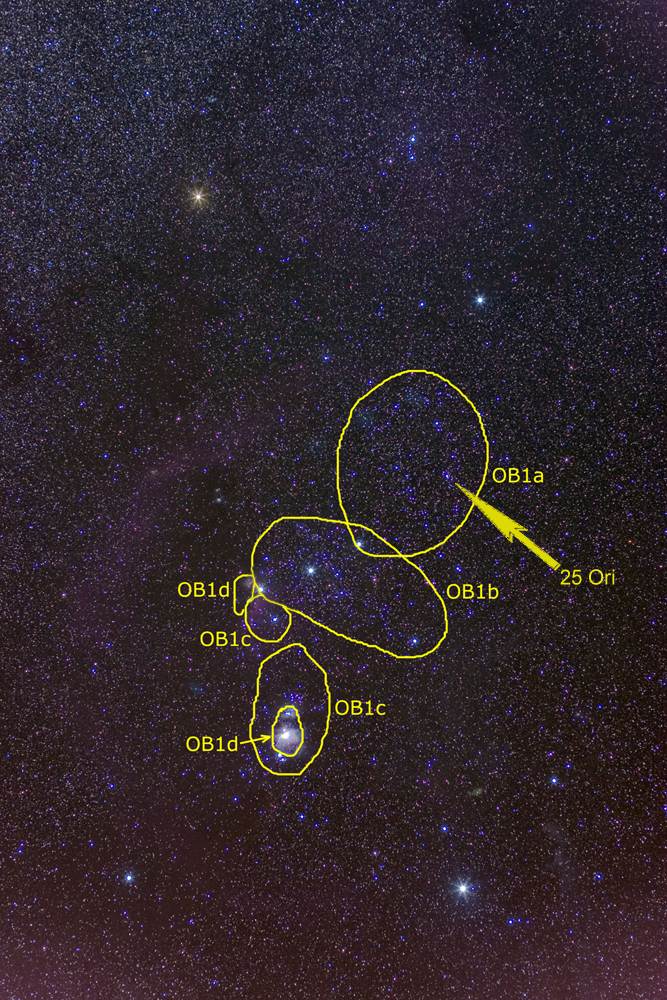
Map of Orion OB1 association

Orion OB1 is a prominent OB association located in the constellation of Orion. It is linked with Orion Nebula and active star-forming region of Orion Molecular Cloud Complex.

== Gallery ==
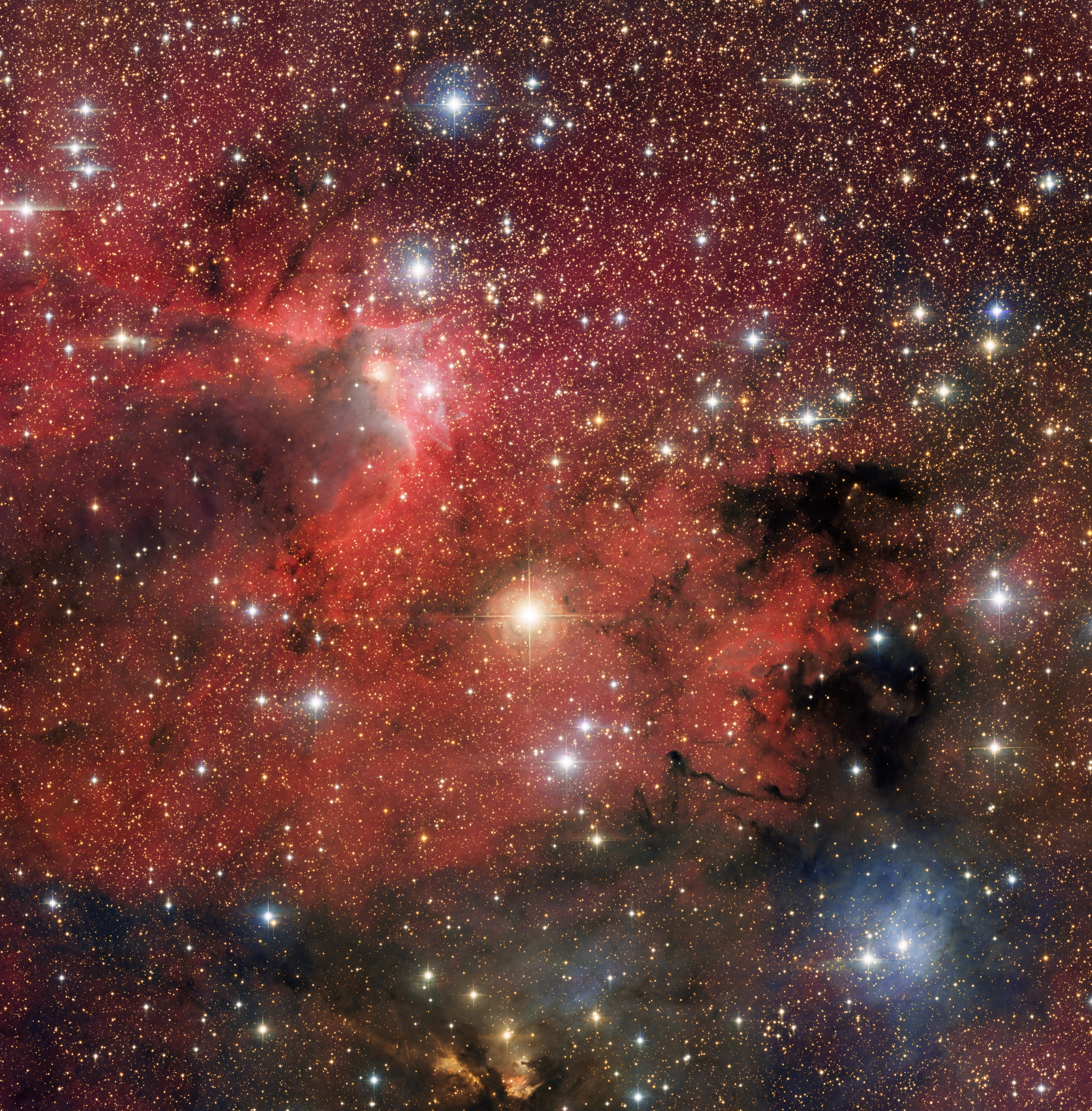
Image of Cepheus OB3

== See also ==
- OB stars
- Cepheus OB2 Region
- Cepheus OB3 Region
- Cepheus OB4 Region
- Stellar associations
- Sagittarius OB7
