= NGC 7790 =

Open star cluster in the constellation Cassiopeia

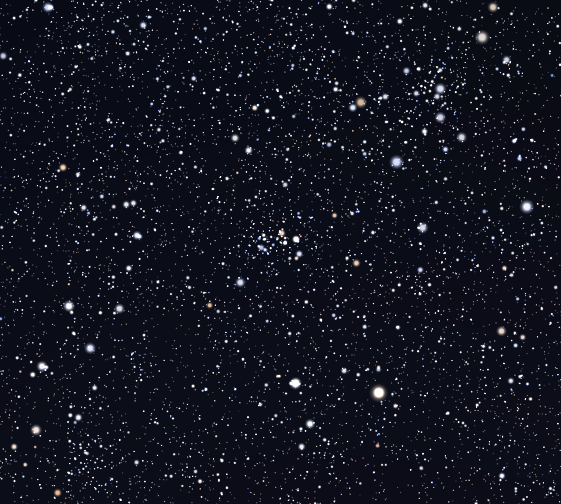
- NGC 7790 (taken from Stellarium); Credit: Roberto Mura

Observation data (J2000.0 epoch)
- Right ascension: 23^{h} 58^{m} 24.2^{s}
- Declination: +61° 12′ 30″
- Distance: 10.76 ± 0.75 kly (3.30 ± 0.23 kpc)
- Apparent magnitude (V): 8.5
- Apparent dimensions (V): 7′.4 diameter

Physical characteristics
- Estimated age: 60–80 Myr
- Other designations: Cr 461

Associations
- Constellation: Cassiopeia

NGC 7790, also known as the Widow's Web Cluster, is a young open cluster of stars located some 10,800 light years away from Earth in the northern constellation of Cassiopeia. At this distance, the light from the cluster has undergone extinction from interstellar gas and dust equal to E(B – V ) = 0.51 magnitude in the UBV photometric system. NGC 7790 has a Trumpler class rating of II2m and the estimated age is 60–80 million years. It contains three cepheid variables: CEa Cas, CEb Cas, and CF Cas.

This cluster is on an orbit through the Milky Way galaxy that has an eccentricity of 0.22 ± 0.07 and a period of (225.0 ± 27.1) million years. It will come as close as 20.2 ± 3.9 kly (6.2 ± 1.2 kpc) to, and as distant as 31.6 ± 2.9 kly (9.7 ± 0.9 kpc) from, the Galactic Center. The maximum distance reached above (or below) the galactic plane is 0.78 ± 1.30 kly (0.24 ± 0.40 kpc). On average, it will cross the galactic plane every (35.7 ± 13.0) million years.

A recent study proposed that NGC 7790 and the neighboring cluster Berkeley 58 could form a binary open cluster, a conclusion supported by their consistent astrometric solutions, evolutionary ages, and radial velocities. Four classical Cepheid variables (CE Cas A, CE Cas B, CF Cas, and CG Cas) were identified as possible members of the binary cluster.
