= NGC 659 =

Open star cluster in the constellation Cassiopeia

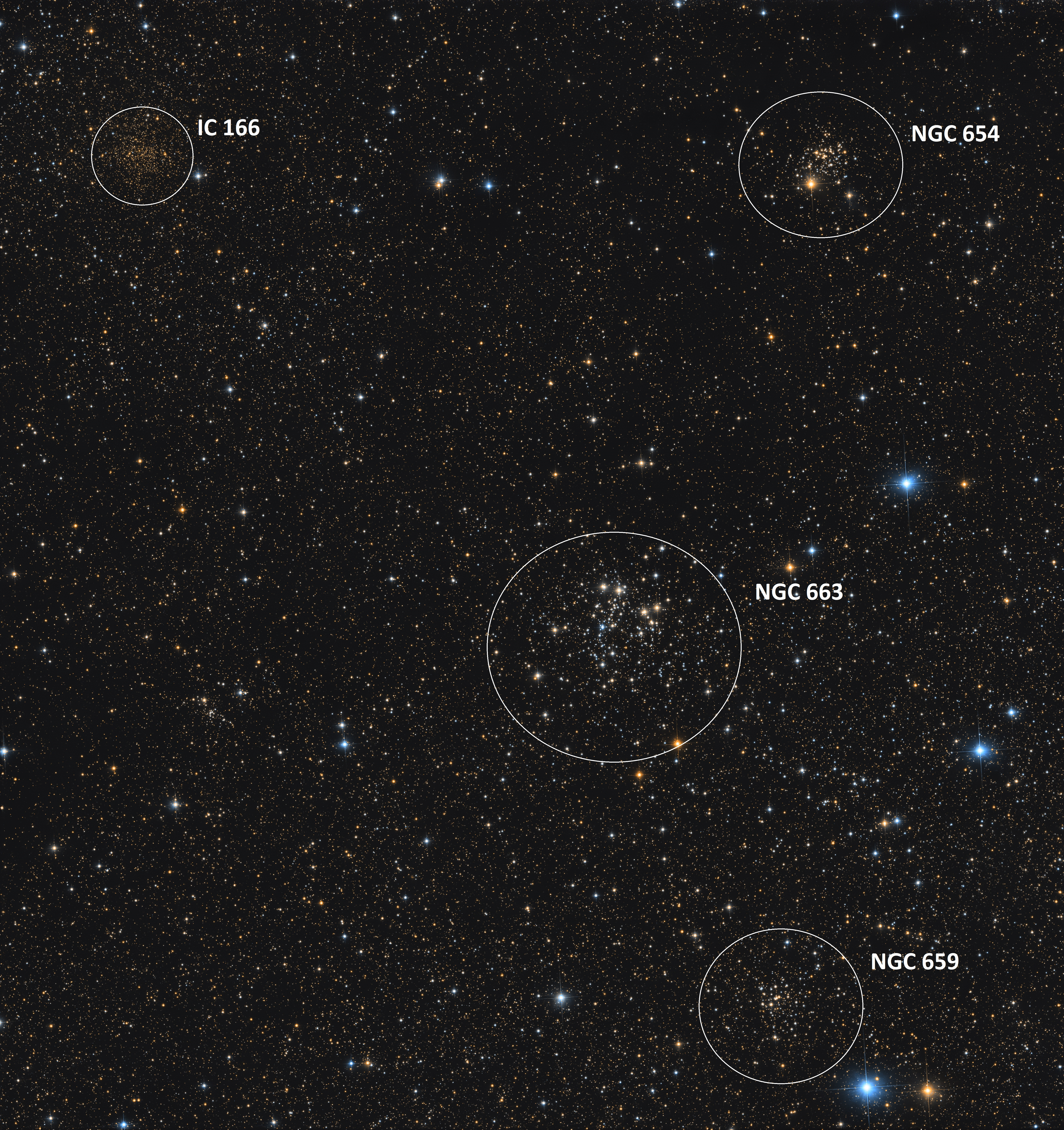
- NGC 659 along with IC 166, NGC 654, and NGC 663

Observation data (J2000.0 epoch)
- Right ascension: 01^{h} 44^{m} 04^{s}
- Declination: +60° 40′
- Distance: 8.2 kly
- Apparent magnitude (V): 7.9
- Apparent dimensions (V): 6.0′

Physical characteristics
- Mass: 10^{5} to 10^{6} M_{☉}
- Radius: 7.5
- Estimated age: 20my
- Other designations: NGC 659, Cr 19, OCL 332

Associations
- Constellation: Cassiopeia

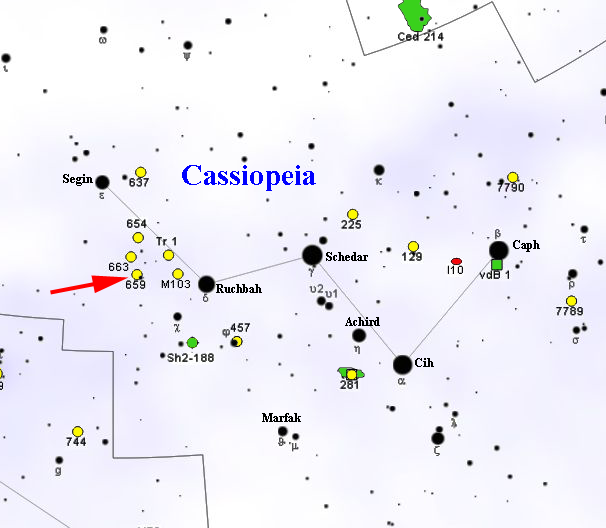
Map showing the location of NGC 659

NGC 659, also known as the Yin-Yang Cluster, is an open cluster in the constellation Cassiopeia. It was discovered by Caroline Herschel in 1783. It was later described by William Herschel as "A beautiful cluster of pretty large stars near 15' diameter considerably rich". It is located in the sky almost directly next to NGC 663.
