= NGC 7510 =

Open cluster of stars in constellation Cepheus

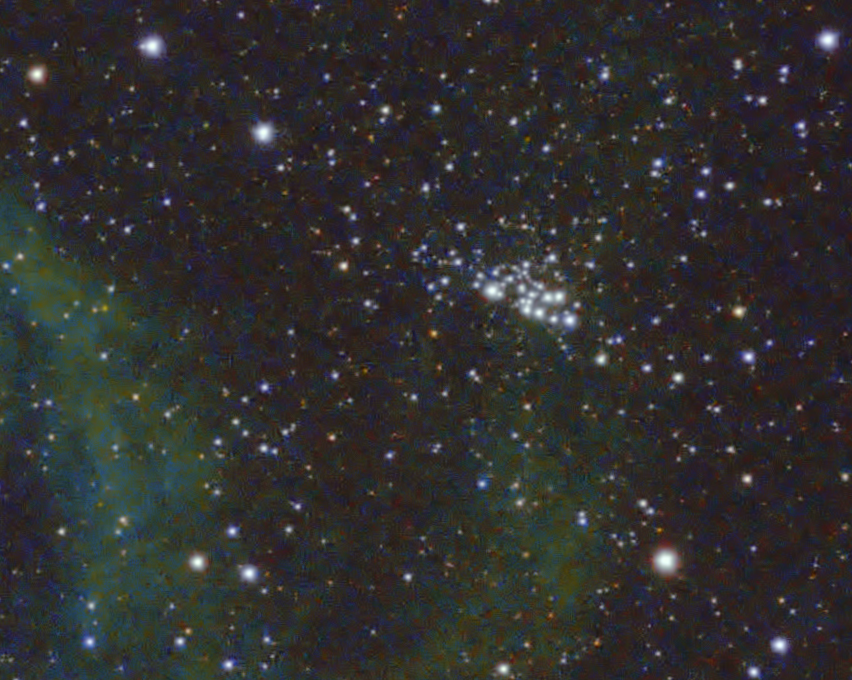
- Amateur image of NGC7510

Observation data (J2000.0 epoch)
- Right ascension: 23^{h} 11.1^{m}
- Declination: +60° 34′
- Distance: 11.4 kly (3.48 kpc)
- Apparent magnitude (V): 7.9
- Apparent dimensions (V): 7.0′

Physical characteristics
- Estimated age: 10^{7}
- Other designations: Cr 454

Associations
- Constellation: Cepheus

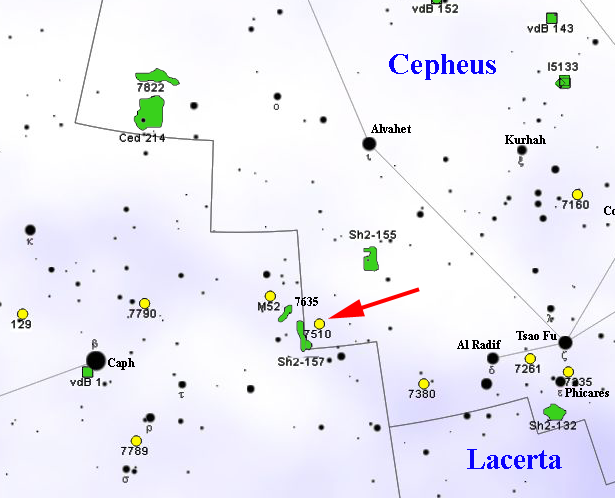
Map showing location of NGC 7510 (Roberto Mura)

NGC 7510, also known as the Dormouse Cluster, is an open cluster of stars located around 11,400 light years away in the constellation Cepheus, near the border with Cassiopeia. At this distance, the light from the cluster has undergone extinction from interstellar gas and dust equal to E(B – V) = 0.90 ± 0.02 magnitude in the UBV photometric system. Its brightest member is a giant star with a stellar classification of B1.5 III. This cluster forms part of the Perseus Spiral Arm. It has a Trumpler class rating of II 2 m and is around 10 million years old.
