= NGC 663 =

Open star cluster in the constellation Cassiopeia

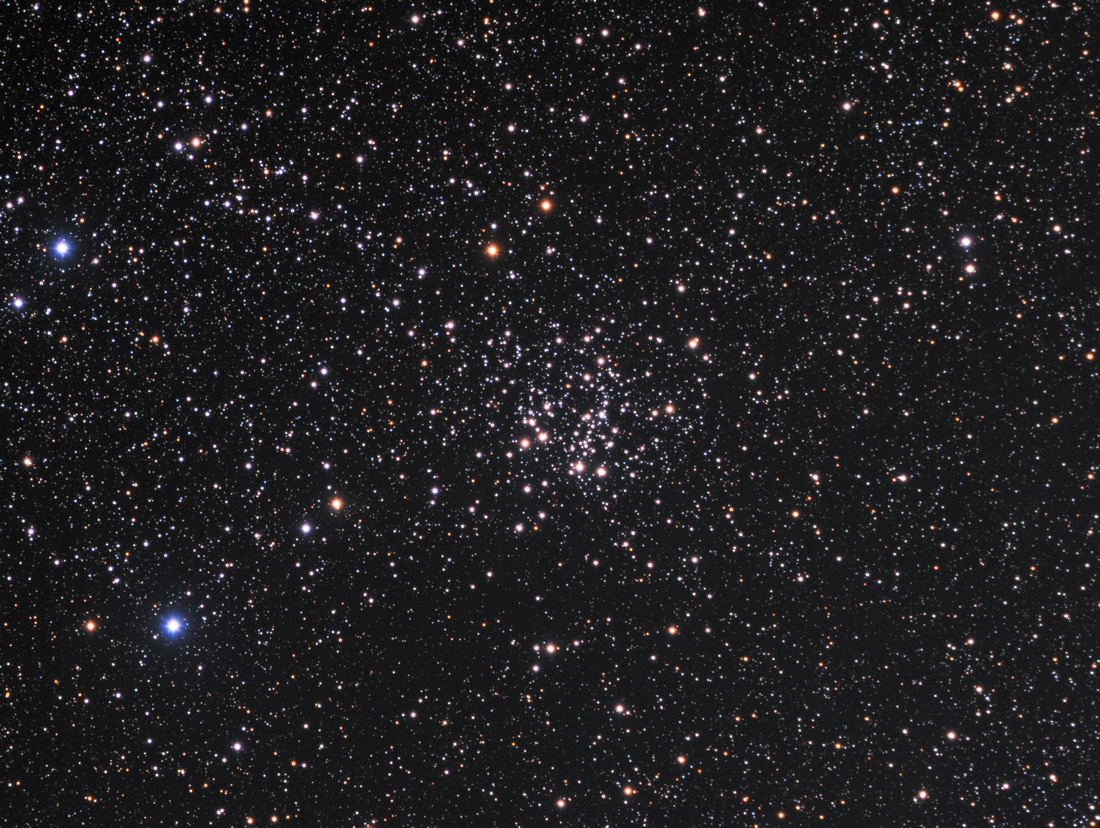
- NGC 663 in Cassiopeia

Observation data (J2000 epoch)
- Right ascension: 01^{h} 46.0^{m}
- Declination: +61° 15′
- Distance: 8,800 ly (2,700 pc)
- Apparent magnitude (V): 7.1
- Apparent dimensions (V): 15′

Physical characteristics
- Other designations: Caldwell 10, Cr 20, Lawnmower Cluster

Associations
- Constellation: Cassiopeia

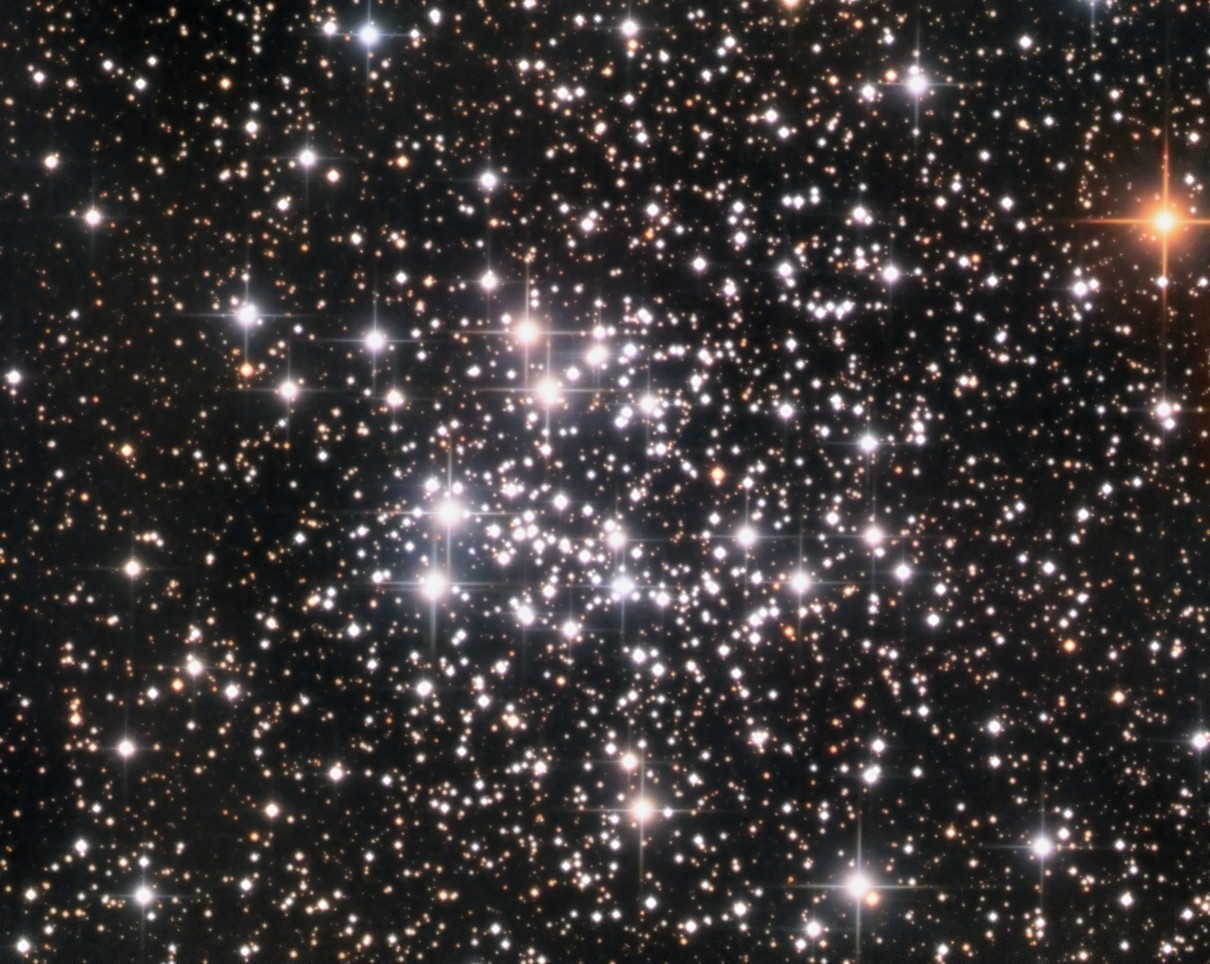
NGC 663 image using PlaneWave CDK 12.5" telescope from Talent, OR

NGC 663 (also known as Caldwell 10) is a young open cluster located 8,800 light years from Earth in the constellation of Cassiopeia. It has an estimated 400 stars and spans about a quarter of a degree across the sky. It can reportedly be detected with the unaided eye, although a telescope is recommended for best viewing. The brightest members of the cluster can be viewed with binoculars. Although the listed visual magnitude is 7.1, several observers have reported higher estimates.

Based on its parallax as measured by Gaia, it is located about 2,700 parsecs distant with an estimated age of 20–25 million years. This means that stars of spectral class B2 or higher (in the sense of higher mass), are reaching the end of their main sequence lifespan. This cluster appears to be located in front of a molecular cloud, although the two are not physically associated. This cloud has the effect of blocking background stars from the visual image of the cluster as it lies at a distance of 300 parsecs.

This cluster is of interest because of the high number of Be stars, with a total of about 24 discovered. These are spectral class B stars that show prominent emission lines of hydrogen in their spectrum. Most of the Be stars in the cluster lie between spectral class B0 and B3. A candidate member of the cluster, LS I +61° 235, is a Be star with an X-ray binary component that has a period of about three years. There are at least five blue stragglers in the cluster. These are stars that formed by the merger of two other stars. Two of the cluster's star systems are likely eclipsing binaries with periods of 0.6 and 1.03 days. NGC 663 also has two red supergiant stars, both located on its periphery

The star cluster is assumed to form part of the stellar association Cassiopeia OB8, that is located in the Perseus Arm of the Milky Way, along with the open clusters M103, NGC 654, NGC 659, and some supergiant stars scattered between them, all of them having similar ages and distances. It is likely the most massive star cluster in the Cassiopeia OB8 association, and possibly the Perseus Arm.
