= NGC 654 =

Open star cluster in the constellation Cassiopeia

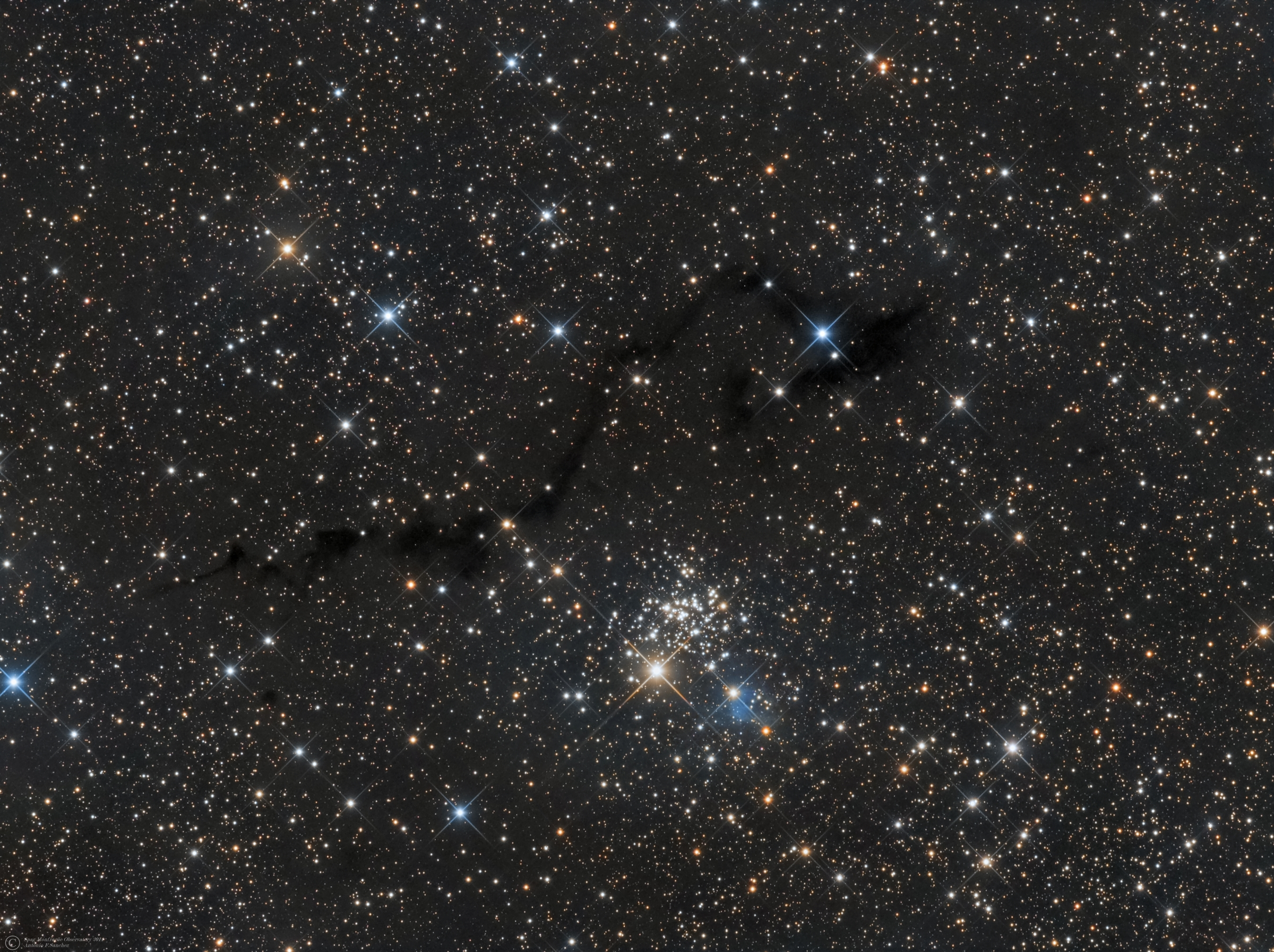
- NGC 654 in Cassiopeia; Credit: Antonio F. Sánchez

Observation data (J2000 epoch)
- Right ascension: 01^{h} 44^{m} 00^{s}
- Declination: +61° 53′ 06″
- Distance: 7,830 ly (2,400 pc)
- Apparent magnitude (V): 6.5
- Apparent dimensions (V): 6'

Physical characteristics
- Estimated age: 14 million years
- Other designations: Fuzzy Butterfly Cluster,Cr 18

Associations
- Constellation: Cassiopeia

NGC 654 is an open cluster of stars in the northern constellation of Cassiopeia. It was discovered by William Herschel in 1787. With apparent magnitude 6.5, it can be observed by binoculars. It is located 2,5° northeast of the star Delta Cassiopeiae. In the same low power field can also be seen the open clusters NGC 663 and NGC 659. It surrounds a 7th magnitude yellowish star, an F5Ia supergiant, which is a possible member of the group.

It is 2,400 parsec away. It is a very young cluster, aged approximately 15 million years, but it could be as old as 40 million years, with a time spread of star formation of at least ~20 Myr. The central region of the cluster shows less reddening than the rest of the cluster. One explanation is that between the Solar System and the cluster lie two dust layers, one at 200pc and one more at 1Kpc. Behind the cluster is one more dust layer. The cluster has approx. 80 members, including three Be stars and a few luminous stars like HD 10494 and F5Ia. The earliest spectral type is around B0.

NGC 654 is assumed to form part of the stellar association Cassiopeia OB8, that is located in the Perseus Arm of the Milky Way, along with the open clusters M103, NGC 663, NGC 659, and some supergiant stars scattered between them, all of them having similar ages and distances.

== Gallery ==
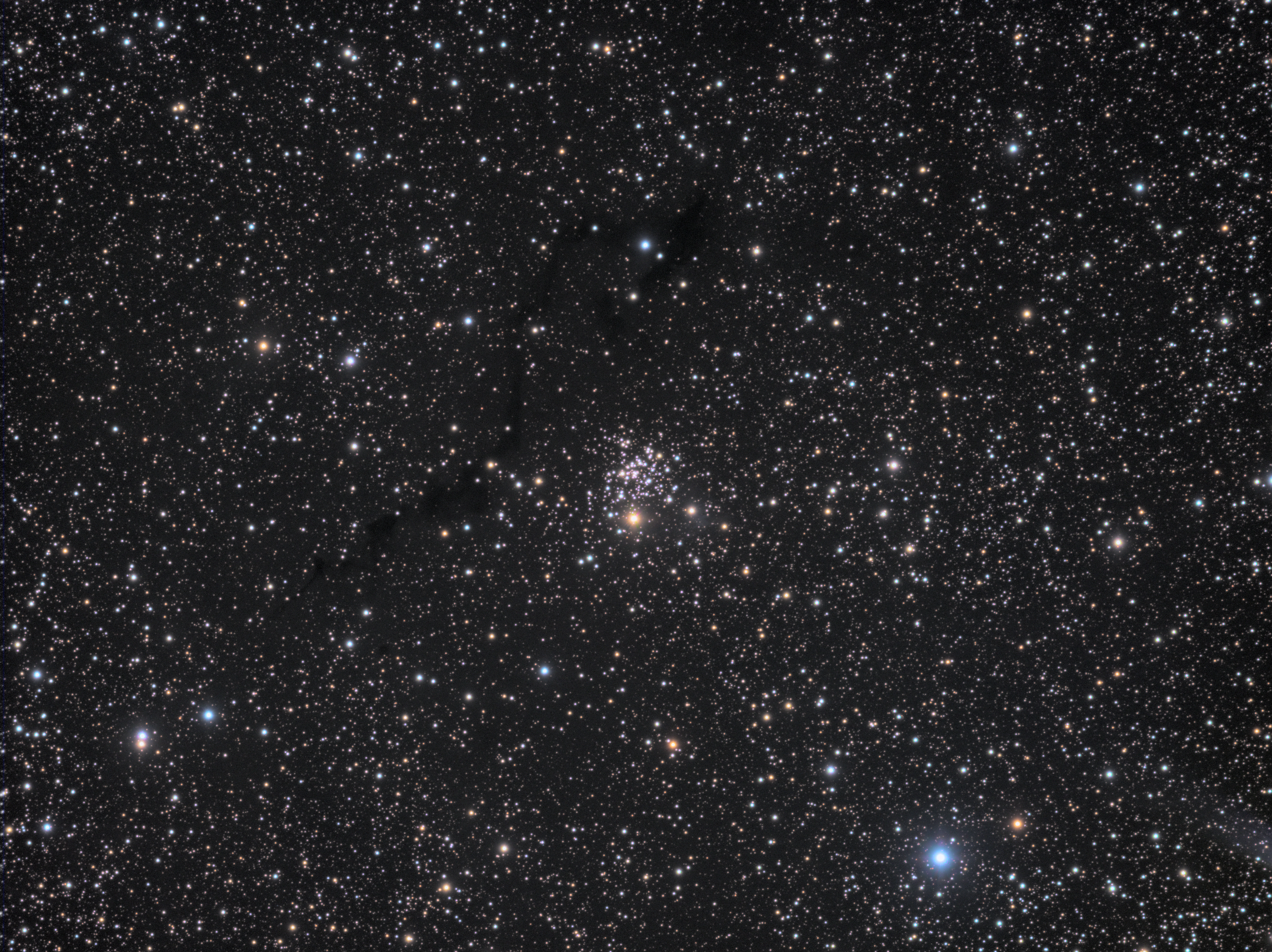
NGC 654 - by Kanwar Singh

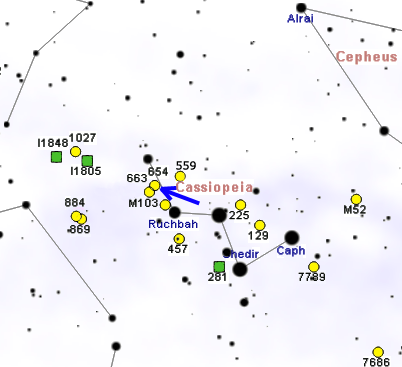
Map showing location of NGC 654
