= ACS =

ACS or Acs may refer to:

== Businesses and organizations ==
=== Businesses ===
- ACS:Law, a British law firm specializing in intellectual property cases
- Achinsk Airport in Krasnoyarsk Krai, Russia (IATA airport code ACS)
- Advanced Card Systems, a Hong Kong–based developer of smart cards and smart card readers
- Advanced Composites Solutions, a Brazilian engineering company specialized in composite materials technology
- Advanced Contact Solutions, a Philippine business process outsourcing company
- Affiliated Computer Services, an American business and technology outsourcing company
- Air Cess, a cargo airline based in Sharjah, United Arab Emirates
- Alaska Communications System, former name of AT&T Alascom, an American communications services company
- Alaska Communications Systems, an American communications services company, distinct from AT&T Alascom
- Applied Communication Sciences, a telecommunications research, engineering and consulting company based in the US
- Grupo ACS (Actividades de Construcción y Servicios), a civil engineering firm based in Madrid, Spain

=== Government and military ===
- Australian Customs Service, former Australian government agency for border protection, duties and taxes (1985–2009)
- Cavalry Corps (Ireland) (1st Armoured Cavalry Squadron), an armoured reconnaissance unit of the Irish Army
- New York City Administration for Children's Services, governmental agency of New York City

=== Professional organizations ===
- American Ceramic Society, an American professional organization
- American Cheese Society, a professional organization of the American cheese industry
- American Chemical Society, an American professional association
- American College of Surgeons, a fellowship of American surgeons
- American Constitution Society for Law and Policy, an organization of lawyers and law students in the US
- Association of Cricket Statisticians and Historians, an association founded England in 1973 to collect cricket data
- Australian Cinematographers Society, a professional not-for-profit organisation
- Australian Computer Society, an association for information and communications technology professionals

=== Schools ===
- ACS International Schools, a group of international schools in the UK
- Alabaster City Schools, a school district headquartered in Alabaster, Alabama
- Alperton Community School, a secondary school in London, UK
- American College of Sofia, a secondary school in Sofia, Bulgaria
- American Community School at Beirut, an international private school in Beirut, Lebanon
- American Community School in Amman, an international school in Amman, Jordan
- American Community School of Abu Dhabi, an international school of Abu Dhabi, United Arab Emirates
- American Community Schools, an English-speaking private school system in Athens, Greece
- American Cooperative School of La Paz
- American Cooperative School of Tunis
- Anglo-Chinese School, Singapore, a group of Methodist schools in Singapore
- Anglo-Chinese Schools, Malaysia, a group of Methodist schools in Malaysia
- Arkansas Correctional School, a school system in prisons, in Arkansas
- Associated Colleges of the South, a group of liberal arts colleges in the US
- Assumption College School, a catholic high school in Ontario, Canada
- Aurora Christian Schools, a private PreK-12 school in Aurora, Illinois, US
- Avery Coonley School, a private elementary school in Downers Grove, Illinois, US
- Lehman Alternative Community School, a combined middle and high school Ithaca, New York

=== Sports organizations ===
- AC Sparta Prague, a Czech football club
- AC Sporting, a Lebanese football club
- American CueSports Alliance, a US-based pool league
- Australian Cricket Society, an association of cricket lovers

=== Other organizations ===
- Active Club Scotland, a far-right hate group linked to the worldwide Active Club Network
- American Cancer Society, an American voluntary health organization dedicated to eliminating cancer
- American Colonization Society, an organization that helped in founding Liberia as a colony for freed slaves
- American Cryonics Society, non-profit corporation that supports and promotes research and education into cryonics
- Association of Caribbean States, an advisory, consultative body of Caribbean countries
- Audience Council Scotland, a BBC Trust organisation in Scotland
- Automobile Club of Switzerland, a Swiss motor sports organization
- Redfern Aboriginal Children's Services, a community services organisation for Indigenous children in Sydney, Australia

== Science and technology ==
=== Computing ===
- Access Control Server, a component of Cisco's Network Admission Control technology
- Access Control Server, the server authenticating a card in the 3-D Secure framework
- Access Control Service, a cloud-based service for authentication and authorization
- ACS-1 and ACS-360, supercomputers designed but never completed in the 1960s by the IBM Advanced Computing Systems
- Action Code Script, a scripting language used in video games such as Hexen: Beyond Heretic
- Adobe Creative Suite, a software package by Adobe Inc.
- Atacama Large Millimeter Array ("ALMA") Common Software, a control framework used in ground-based astronomy projects
- Audit Collection Services, a component of Microsoft System Center Operations Manager
- ATA Command Set

=== Medicine ===
- Acetyl-CoA synthetase, an enzyme
- Abdominal compartment syndrome
- Acute compartment syndrome
- Acute coronary syndrome, a form of chest pain due to reduced oxygen supply to the heart muscle
- Advanced Cataract Surgery, the modern method of cataract removal using phacoemulsification
- Alternate care site, a non-traditional medical treatment facility established in a public health crisis
- Antireticular cytotoxic serum, a experimental Soviet medical and lifespan extension treatment
- Atriocaval shunt, a surgical procedure
- 2-Amino-3-carboxymuconic semialdehyde, a chemical in tryptophan metabolism

=== Military technology ===
- ACS-3, the military version of Raybird-3, a Ukrainian UAV
- Aerial Common Sensor, a Lockheed Martin reconnaissance aircraft airframe for the US Army and Navy
- Army Combat Shirt, flame-resistant shirt developed for the US Army
- Attack Characterization System
- Auxiliary crane ship, a US Navy hull classification

=== Space technology ===
- Advanced Camera for Surveys, an instrument aboard the Hubble Space Telescope
- Advanced Composite Solar Sail System (ACS3), a NASA technology demonstration for future small spacecraft
- Attitude control system, a spacecraft system

=== Other uses in science and technology ===
- ACS, a taxonomic clade within Myzozoa
- Air cavity system, using air beneath a maritime vessel's hull to increase speed and fuel efficiency
- Anticenter shell, a supershell located outside of the galaxy

== Other uses ==
- Acroá language, an extinct Ge language of Brazil (language code "acs")
- Achinsk Airport in Krasnoyarsk Krai, Russia (IATA airport code ACS)
- Acs (surname)
- Advanced Communicator, Silver ("ACS"), Toastmasters International Recognition for advanced Communication training
- Alternative compensation system, a way to allow reproduction of digital copyrighted works while still paying the authors and copyright owners
- American Community Survey, a project of the US Census Bureau
- American Crime Story, an anthology television series
- Auxiliary crane ship, a US Navy hull classification

== See also ==
- Ács, a Hungarian town
