= Superbubble =

Cavity hundreds of light years across created by strong stellar winds in a galaxy

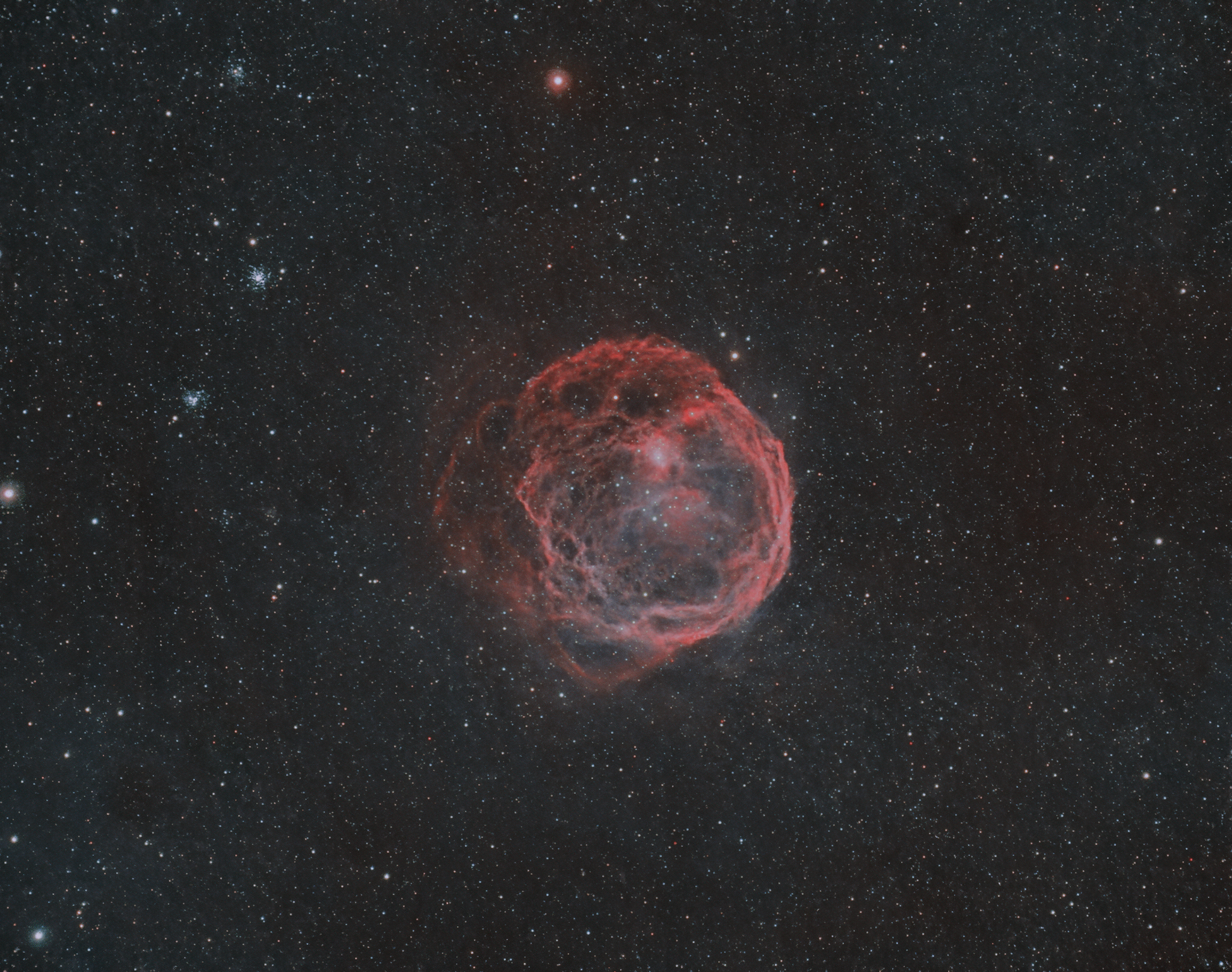
The superbubble Henize 70, also known as N70 or DEM301, in the Large Magellanic Cloud

In astronomy a superbubble or supershell is a cavity which is hundreds of light years across and is populated with hot (10^{6} K) gas atoms, less dense than the surrounding interstellar medium, blown against that medium and carved out by multiple supernovae and stellar winds. The winds, passage and gravity of newly born stars strip superbubbles of any other dust or gas. The Solar System lies near the center of an old superbubble, known as the Local Bubble, whose boundaries can be traced by a sudden rise in dust extinction of exterior stars at distances greater than a few hundred light years.

== Formation ==
The most massive stars, with masses ranging from eight to roughly one hundred solar masses and spectral types of O and early B, are usually found in groups called OB associations. Massive O stars have strong stellar winds, and most of these stars explode as supernovae at the end of their lives.

The strongest stellar winds release kinetic energy of 10^{51} ergs (10^{44} J) over the lifetime of a star, which is equivalent to a supernova explosion. These winds can form stellar wind bubbles dozens of light years across. Inside OB associations, the stars are close enough that their wind bubbles merge, forming a giant bubble called a superbubble. When stars die, supernova explosions, similarly, drive blast waves that can reach even larger sizes, with expansion velocities up to several hundred km s^{−1}. Stars in OB associations are not gravitationally bound, but they drift apart at small speeds (of around 20 km s^{−1}), and they exhaust their fuel rapidly (after a few millions of years). As a result, most of their supernova explosions occur within the cavity formed by the stellar wind bubbles. These explosions never form a visible supernova remnant, but instead expend their energy in the hot interior as sound waves. Both stellar winds and stellar explosions thus power the expansion of the superbubble in the interstellar medium.

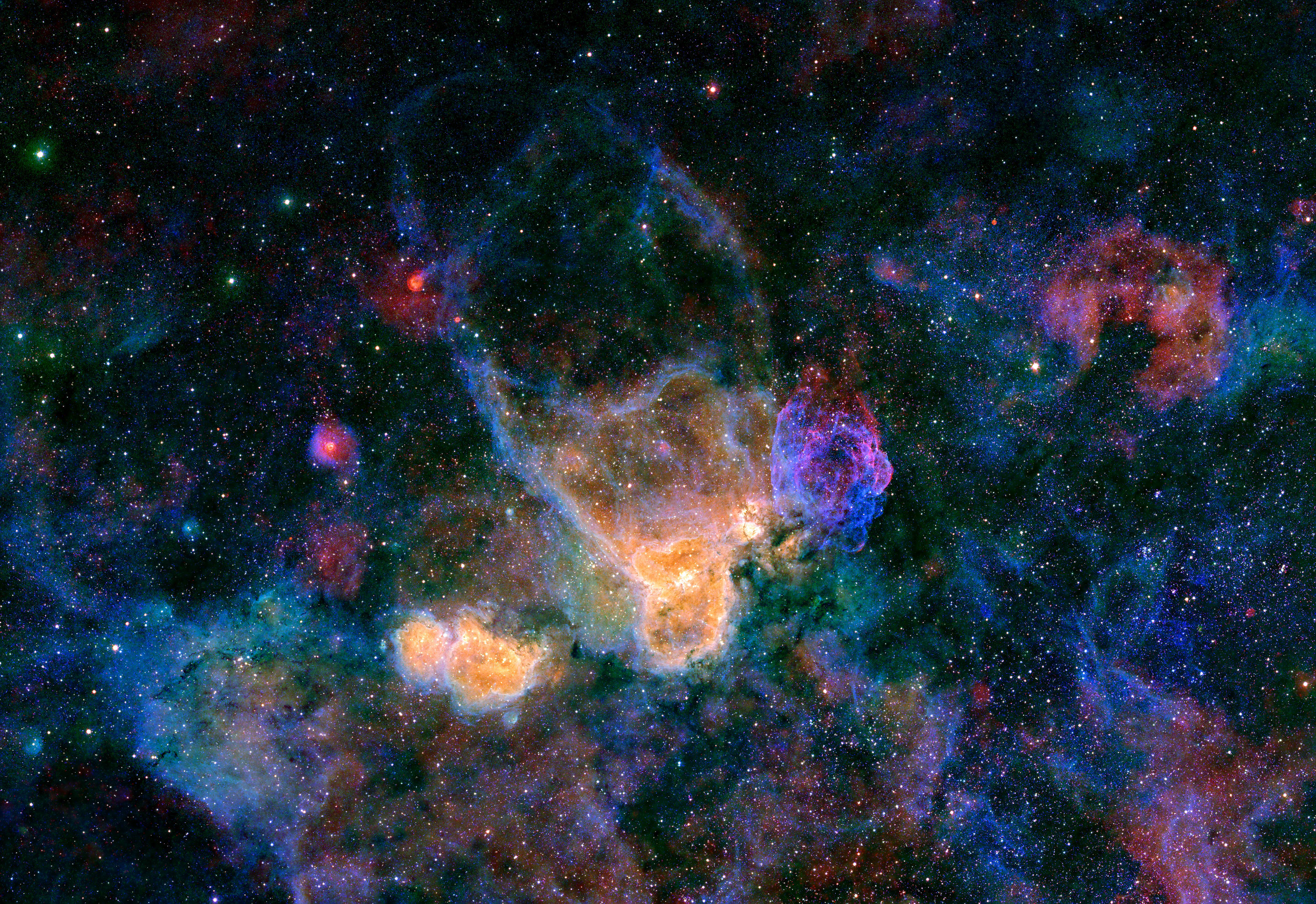
W4 superbubble/chimney in emission lines, as seen by the Northern Sky Narrowband Survey.

The interstellar gas swept up by superbubbles generally cools, forming a dense shell around the cavity. These shells were first observed in line emission at twenty-one centimeters from hydrogen, leading to the formulation of the theory of superbubble formation. They are also observed in X-ray emission from their hot interiors, in optical line emission from their ionized shells, and in infrared continuum emission from dust swept up in their shells. X-ray and visible emission are typically observed from younger superbubbles, while older, larger objects seen in twenty-one centimeters may even result from multiple superbubbles combining, and so are sometimes distinguished by calling them supershells.

Large enough superbubbles can blow through the entire galactic disk, releasing their energy into the surrounding galactic halo or even into the intergalactic medium. A candidate for such a structure, also referred to as a chimney, is the W4 superbubble (depicted on the right).

== Examples ==
- LHA 120-N 44 (N44) in the Large Magellanic Cloud.
- Anticenter shell, a supershell once called "Snickers"
- Carina Flare
- Henize 70
- Ophiuchus Superbubble
- The Scutum Supershell
- Orion-Eridanus Superbubble
- The Perseus-Taurus Shell
- The Local Bubble

== Image gallery ==
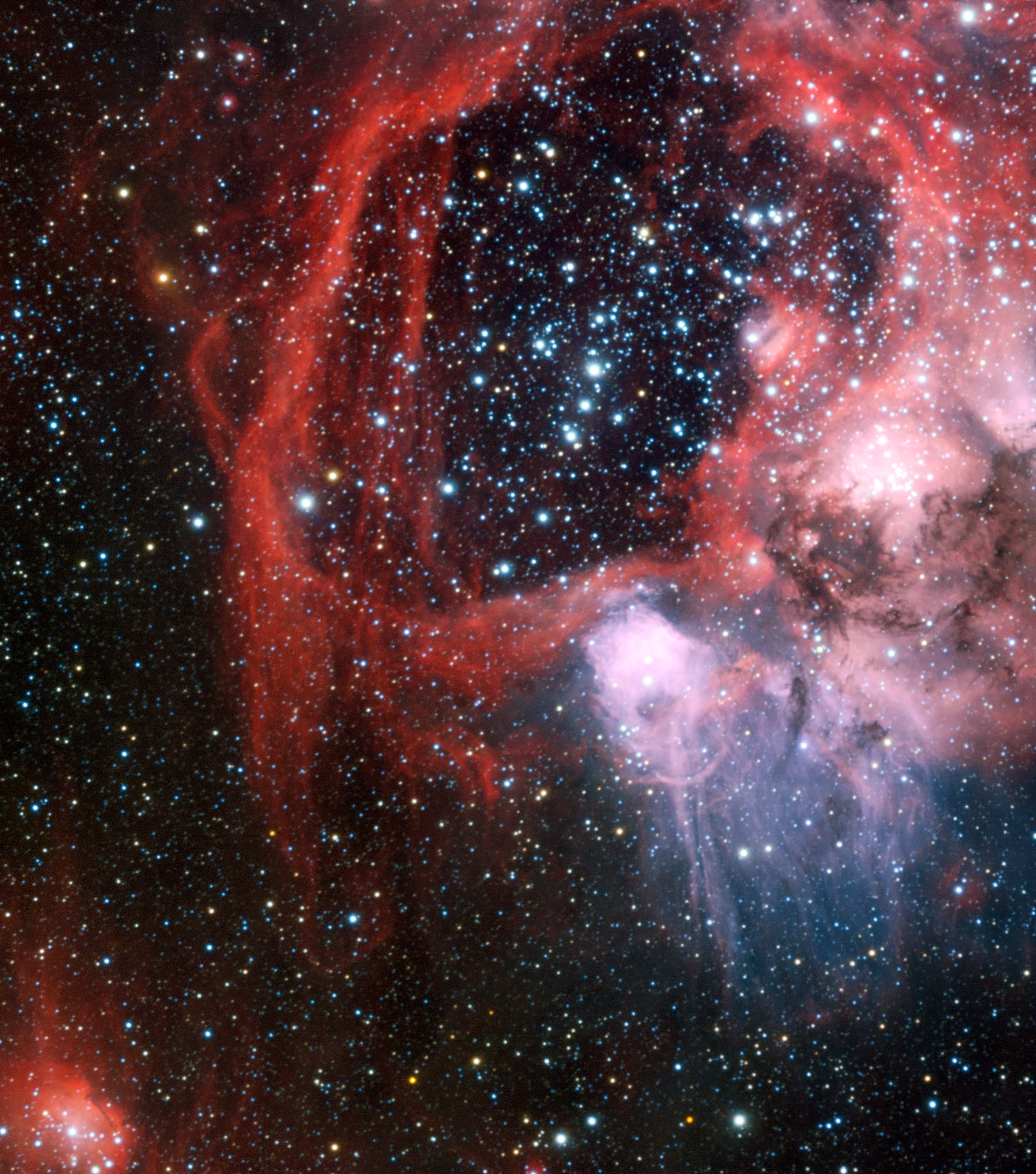
Very Large Telescope image of superbubble LHA 120-N 44 in the Large Magellanic Cloud. Credit: ESO/Manu Mejias.

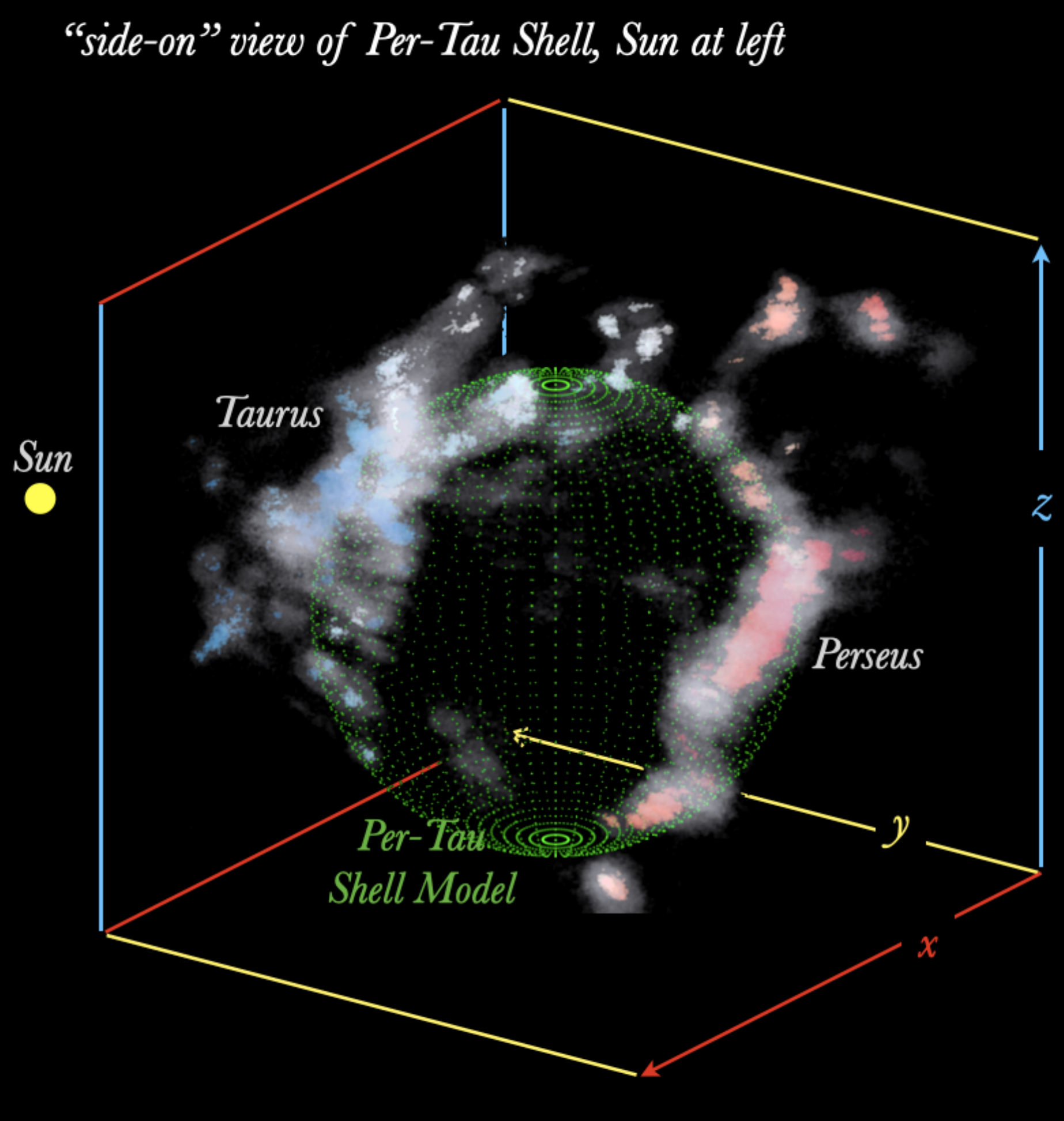
The Per-Tau Shell, a giant star-forming spherical shell with the Perseus and Taurus molecular clouds on its edge.

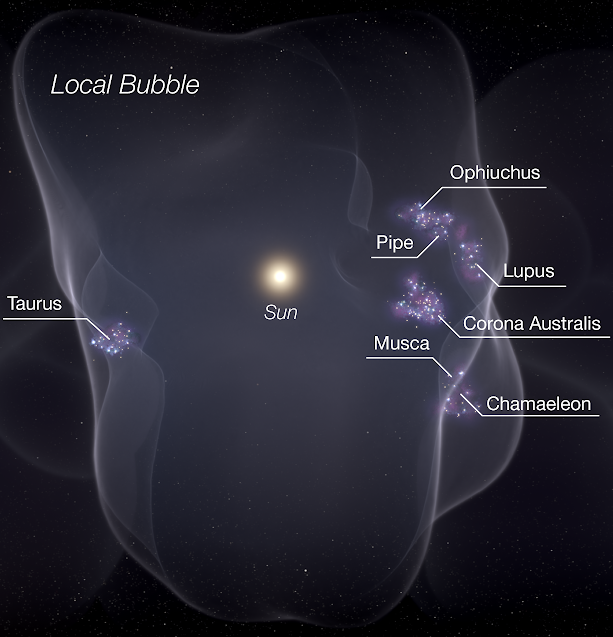
The Local Bubble, a ~1,000-light-years wide and ~14 Myr old superbubble, is driving nearly all recent star formation near the Sun.

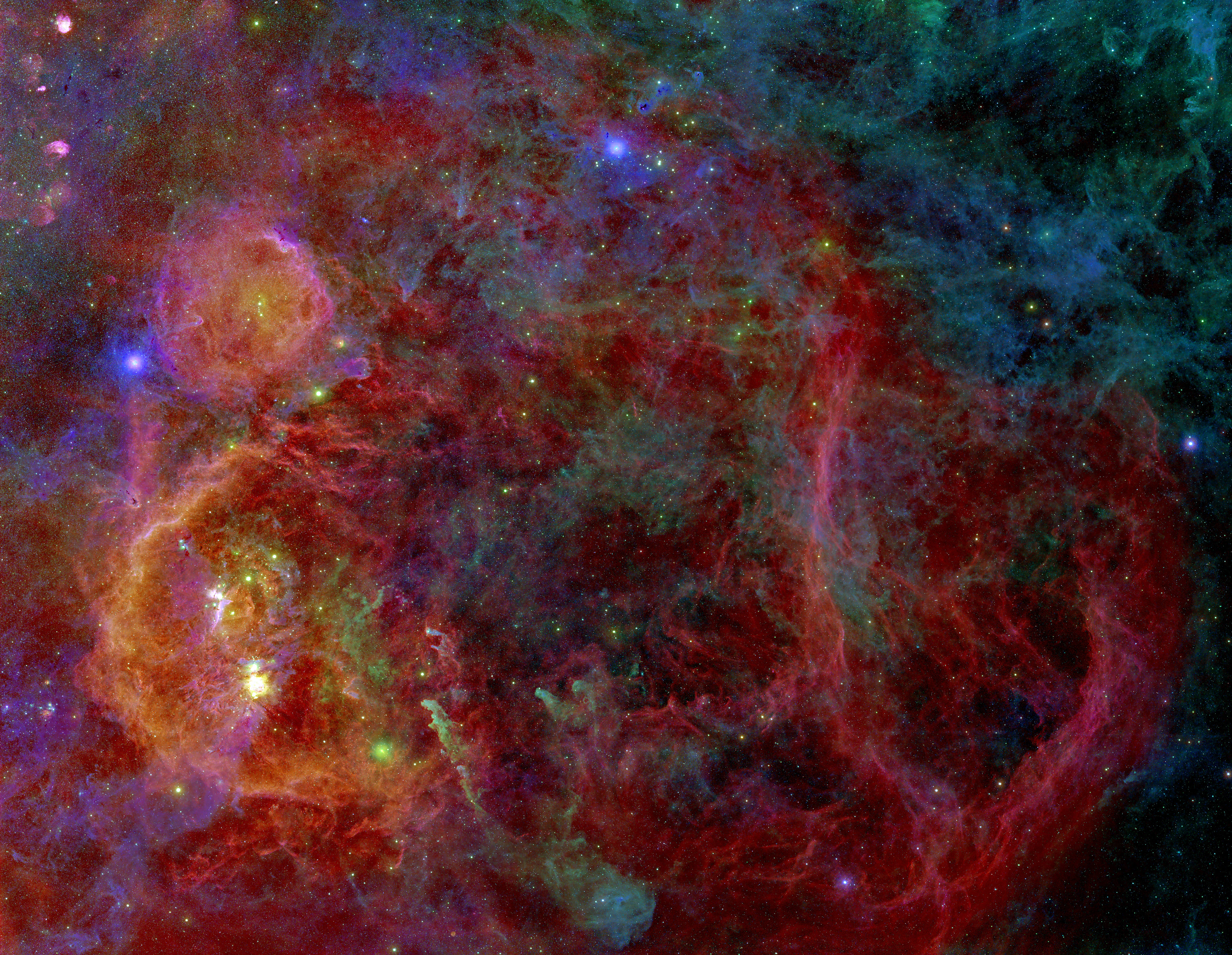
Orion–Eridanus Superbubble (the nearest superbubble) in emission lines, as seen by the Northern Sky Narrowband Survey.
