= József Ács =

József Ács may refer to:

- József Ács (painter) (1914–1990), Yugoslav painter, art teacher and art critic
- József Ács (sculptor) (1931–2023), Hungarian sculptor and medalist
- József Ács (musician) (born 1948), German composer, pianist and organist of Hungarian origin
- József Ács (author) (born 1965), Hungarian writer
