= N44 =

N44 may refer to:

- N44 (emission nebula), in the Large Magellanic Cloud
- A44 motorway (Netherlands)
- HDMS Lossen (N44), a minelayer of the Royal Danish Navy
- London Buses route N44
- Nebraska Highway 44, in the United States
- Robert J. Miller Air Park, in Ocean County, New Jersey, United States
- Sena language
