= PKS 0528+134 =

Blazar in the constellation Orion

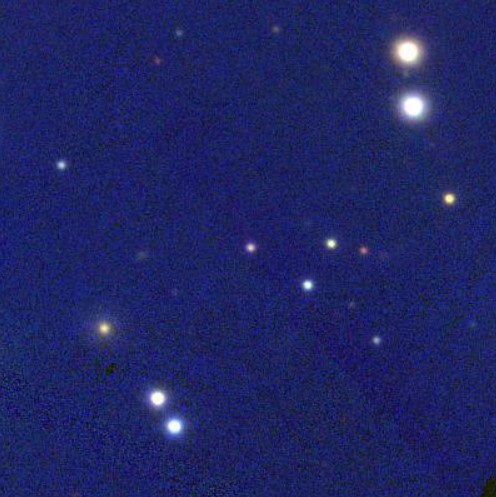
- The blazar PKS 0528+134.

Observation data (J2000.0 epoch)
- Constellation: Orion
- Right ascension: 05^{h} 30^{m} 56.4167^{s}
- Declination: +13° 31′ 55.150″
- Redshift: 2.060000
- Heliocentric radial velocity: 617,573 km/s
- Distance: 10.135 Gly
- Apparent magnitude (V): 20.00

Characteristics
- Type: LPQ, FSRQ; HPQ, Blazar

Other designations
- 2E 1289, INTREF 250, LEDA 2824388, TXS 0528+134, OHIO G 147, 1Jy 0528+134, NAIC 0528+134, QSO J0530+13

PKS 0528+134 is a distant blazar located in the Galactic anticenter towards the constellation of Orion. This is a compact radio quasar, classified as radio-loud with a redshift of (z) 2.07 yet having low polarization. It was first discovered in 1977 by astronomers as a radio source and contains a radio spectrum that appears as flat making it a flat-spectrum radio quasar. It has an optical brightness of 19.5.

== Description ==
PKS 0528+134 is found variable on the electromagnetic spectrum and a source of high energy gamma rays. It showed long-term variability on time scales at high radio frequencies. Between 1981 and 1982, PKS 0528+134 exhibited a drop in its 4.8, 8.0 and 14.5 GHz flux value by about 4-5 Jansky (Jy), with a lowest recorded flux of 1.5 Jy in 1990. A drastic increase in gamma ray emission was detected in PKS 0528+134 beginning 1991. That same year, it showed a nonthermal outburst suggesting a period of relativistic plasma being ejected. PKS 0528+134 also had two radio millimeter outbursts.

Between the months of July and December 2009, PKS 0528+134 reached a state of quiescence. When observed by astronomers, they found no traces of either significant flux or spectral variability in most radio bands although flux variability was discovered in optical regime, followed by a weak pattern of spectral softening. This suggests the accretion disk of PKS 0528+134 might play a role at the optical spectrum's blue end. Optical spectropolarimetry also suggests PKS 0528+134 has an extreme degree of polarization, indicating possibility of synchrotron radiation providing emission at the optical spectrum's red end.

Radio images made by the Very Long Baseline Interferometry at 22 GHz shows radio structure of PKS 0528+134 as a 5 mas extended one-sided jet with a more diffused northwest component at a position angle of 50° and two other components located in the west direction of various distances. At 43 GHz, the structure is further resolved into five components showing superluminal motions reaching high as 23 h^{−1} with increasing motions per distance from the core. An inverted core spectrum is also discovered. Very Long Baseline Array finds three of its components shows progressive acceleration with a strongly polarized northern knot feature. A new component is also found at higher frequencies.

The supermassive black hole mass of PKS 0528+134 is estimated to be 85 × 10^{8} M_{☉} based on an equation calculation integrated between the values of 3 and 30 MeV via flux measurements made by the Imaging Compton Telescope. A luminosity value of 4.1 × 10^{49} ergs has also been calculated for the object as well.
