= Henize 70 =

H II region in the Large Magellanic Cloud

Emission nebula
- Superbubble
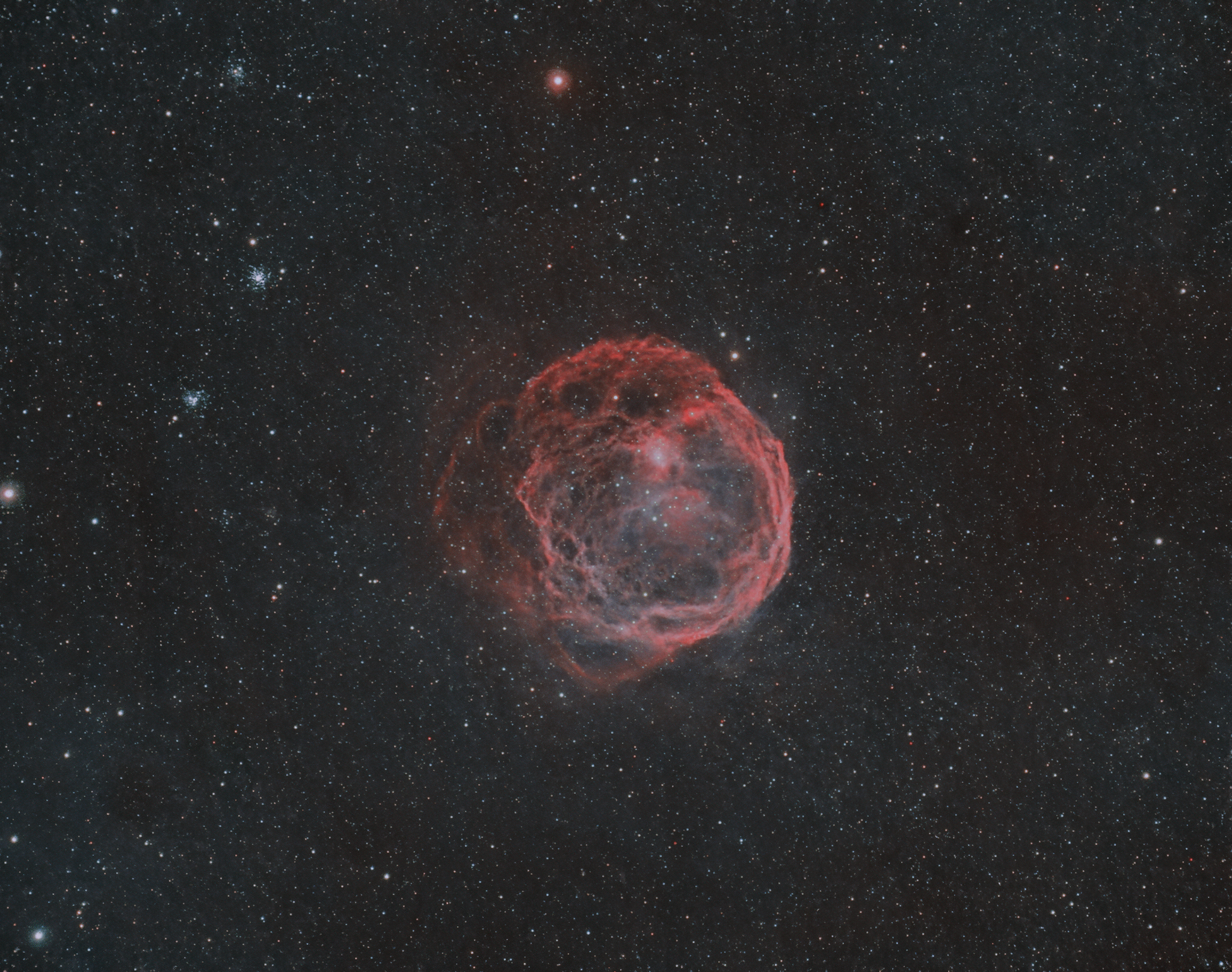
- Amateur photograph of Henize 70

Observation data: J2000 epoch
- Right ascension: 05^{h} 43^{m} 17.5^{s}
- Declination: −67° 50′ 48″
- Distance: ~50,000 pc
- Apparent dimensions (V): 7′ × 8′
- Constellation: Dorado

Physical characteristics
- Dimensions: 346 × 396 ly (Note: Using angular dimensions of 7’ × 8’ and a distance of ~170 kly. $d \times \sin{\theta}$)
- Notable features: Superbubble
- Designations: Henize 70, N70, LHA 120-N 70, DEM L 301, MCELS L-373

Henize 70 (N70) is a faint emission nebula and superbubble located in the Large Magellanic Cloud in the constellation of Dorado.

== Observation history ==
Henize 70 was first observed in 1950 in a survey of bright planetary nebulae. Based on appearance it was proposed that it might be a supernova remnant. In 1956, it was added to a catalogue of Hα emission stars and nebulae by Karl Gordon Henize, where it was described as an emission nebula rather than a planetary nebula.

== Origins ==
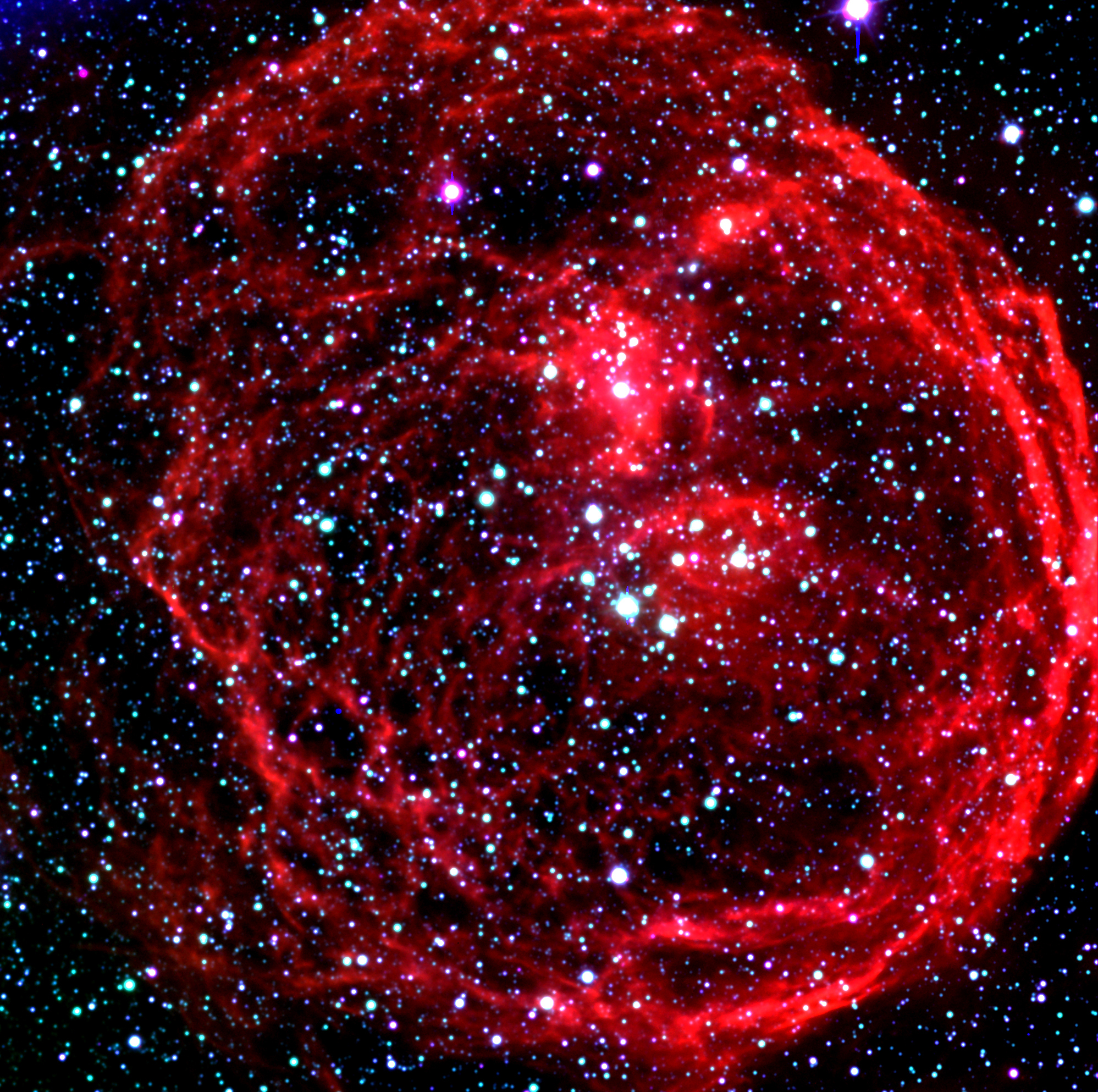
ESO image of Henize 70

A paper published in 1978 proposed that the formations of Henize 70 and other emission nebulae could be due to stellar winds. Later in 1981, a scientific article mentioned a higher likeliness of a supernova explosion forming the nebula instead of stellar winds. A 2014 study measured that Henize 70 featured high S_{II} and Hα ratios, indicating that it is not a supernova remnant.

Henize 70 has spectral line ratios relatively similar to that of supernova remnants due to having similar S_{II}/Hα line ratios although most supernova remnants have higher N_{II}/Hα line ratios.
