= József Ács (sculptor) =

Hungarian sculptor and medalist (1931–2023)

József Ács (10 February 1931 – 14 May 2023) was a Hungarian sculptor and medallist.

== Career ==
Ács studied at the Hungarian Academy of Fine Arts from 1952 to 1958. His work is primarily sculpture, but he also designed portrait busts and medals. In 1965 he was commissioned to produce a bronze bust of Alexander Graham Bell in Budapest. In 1968, he made a solo exhibition at the Cultural Center ("Művelődési Ház") of the Budapest neighborhood of Rákosligeti.

He was also an art critic and without a doubt one of the most prominent figures of pre and postwar painting in Yugoslavia. From 1953 to 1956 he was rector of the School of Applied Arts in Novi Sad, after which he was art critic for the daily newspaper Magyar Szó for the Hungarians of Vojvodina. In his paintings, Ács went through several stages of development, from Post-Impressionism to Surrealism and Abstraction. He exhibited outside Yugoslavia in places like Paris, Vienna, Szeged, Modena, Regensburg and Stuttgart.

Ács died on 14 May 2023, at the age of 92.

== Exhibitions (solo) ==
- 1968 • Rákosliget Cultural Center, Budapest

== Selected group exhibitions ==
- 1958, 1960, 1965, 1966, 1967 • Vásárhely Autumn Exhibitions
- 1960 • II. of the Studio of Young Artists. exhibition • 8th Hungarian Fine Arts Exhibition, Műcsarnok, Budapest
- 1962 • Among working people, Ernst Museum, Budapest
- 1966 • Artists of Angyalföldi II. exhibition, Budapest
- 1967 • 1st National Small Plastic Biennale, Pécs
- 1968 • IV. Balaton Summer Exhibition, Keszthely
- 1969 • II. National Small Plastic Biennale, Pécs
- 1972 • XIII. Summer Exhibition, Szeged
- 1976 • 5th National Small Plastic Biennale, Pécs
- 1978, 1983, 1996 • XVII. exhibition of district artists, Erdős Renée Ház, Budapest

== Gallery ==
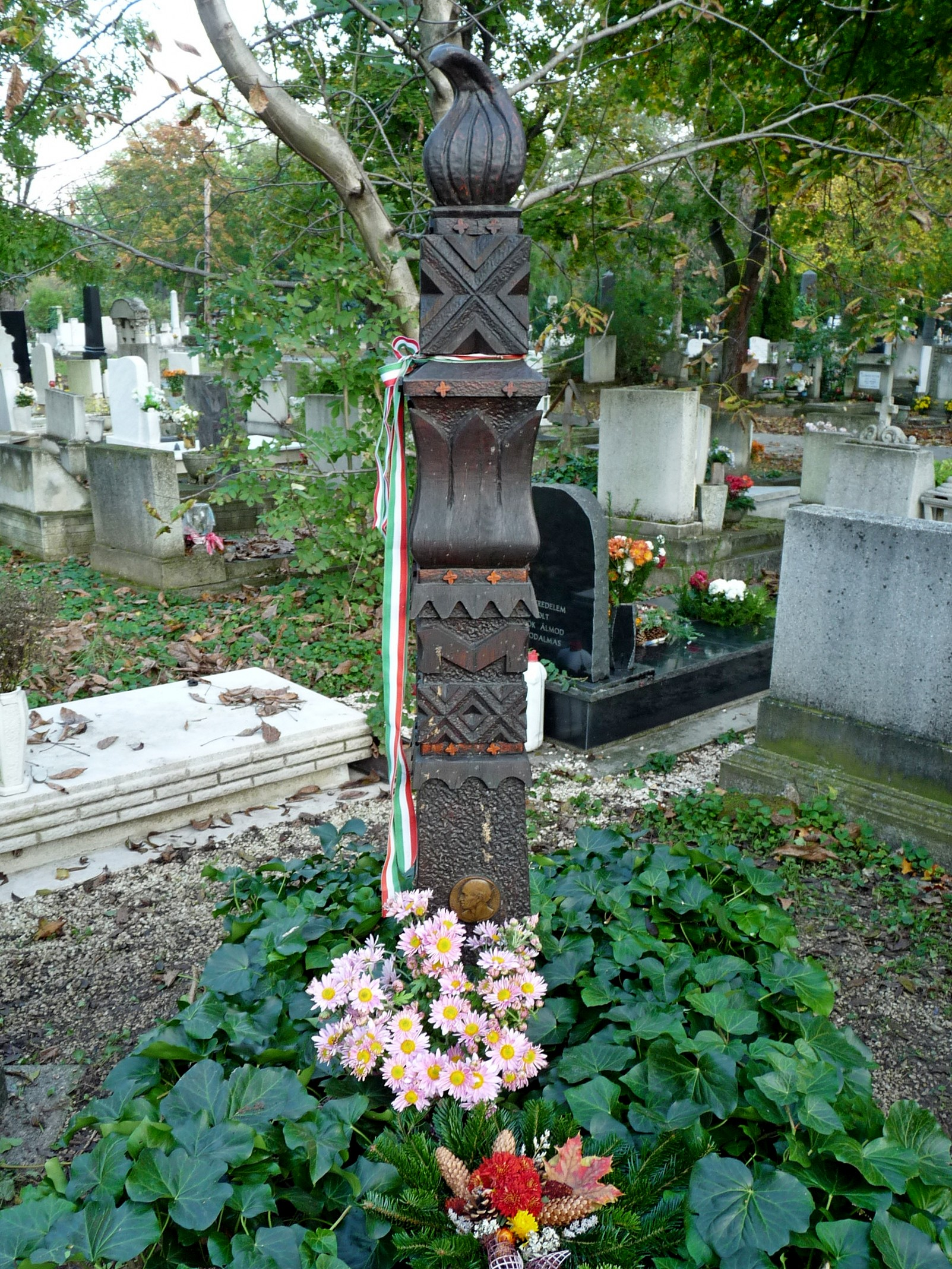
Grave of György Ugray (1908–1971) Hungarian sculptor, in the Óbuda cemetery (21/1). The wooden headboard (kopjafa) was carved by György Ugray Jr., while the bronze medal affixed to the column was made by József Ács (1972).

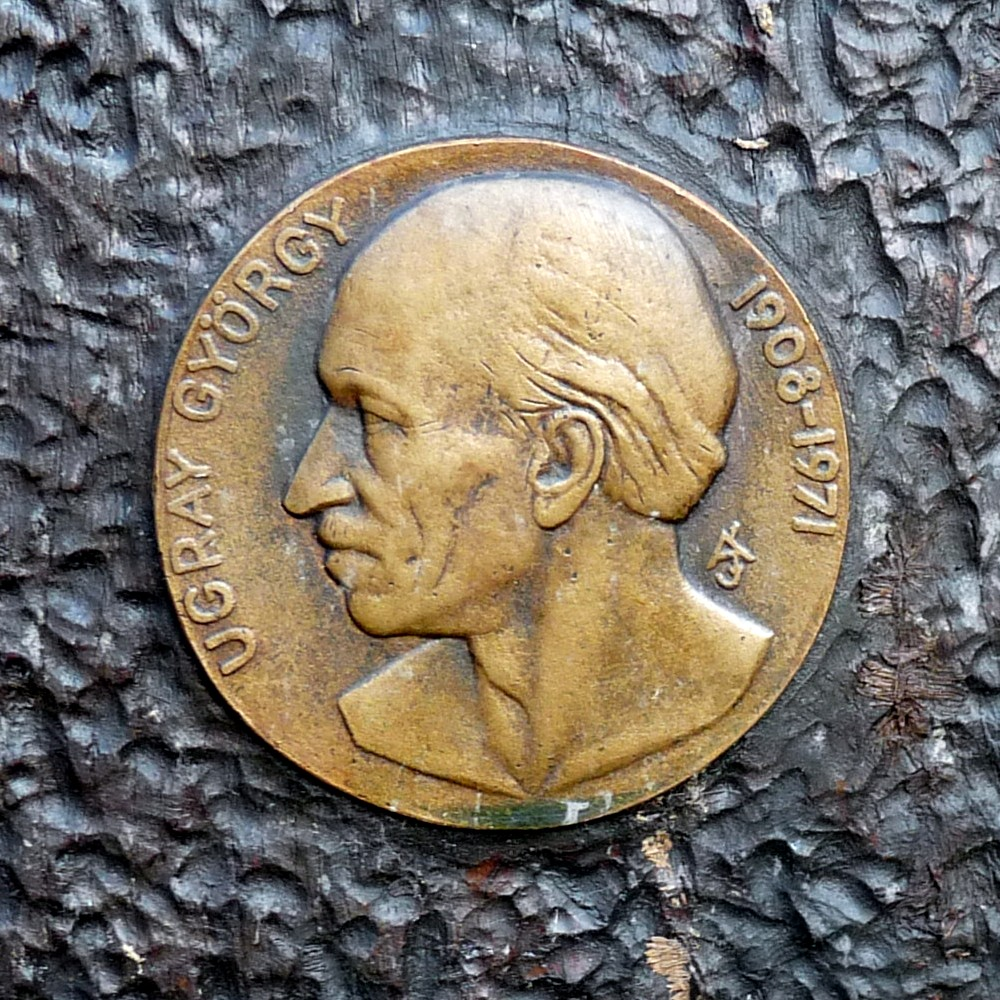
Portrait plaquette of György Ugray (1908-1971), a Hungarian sculptor, affixed to his wooden headboard (kopjafa) in the Óbuda cemetery. The author of the bronze plaquette is József Ács (1972).

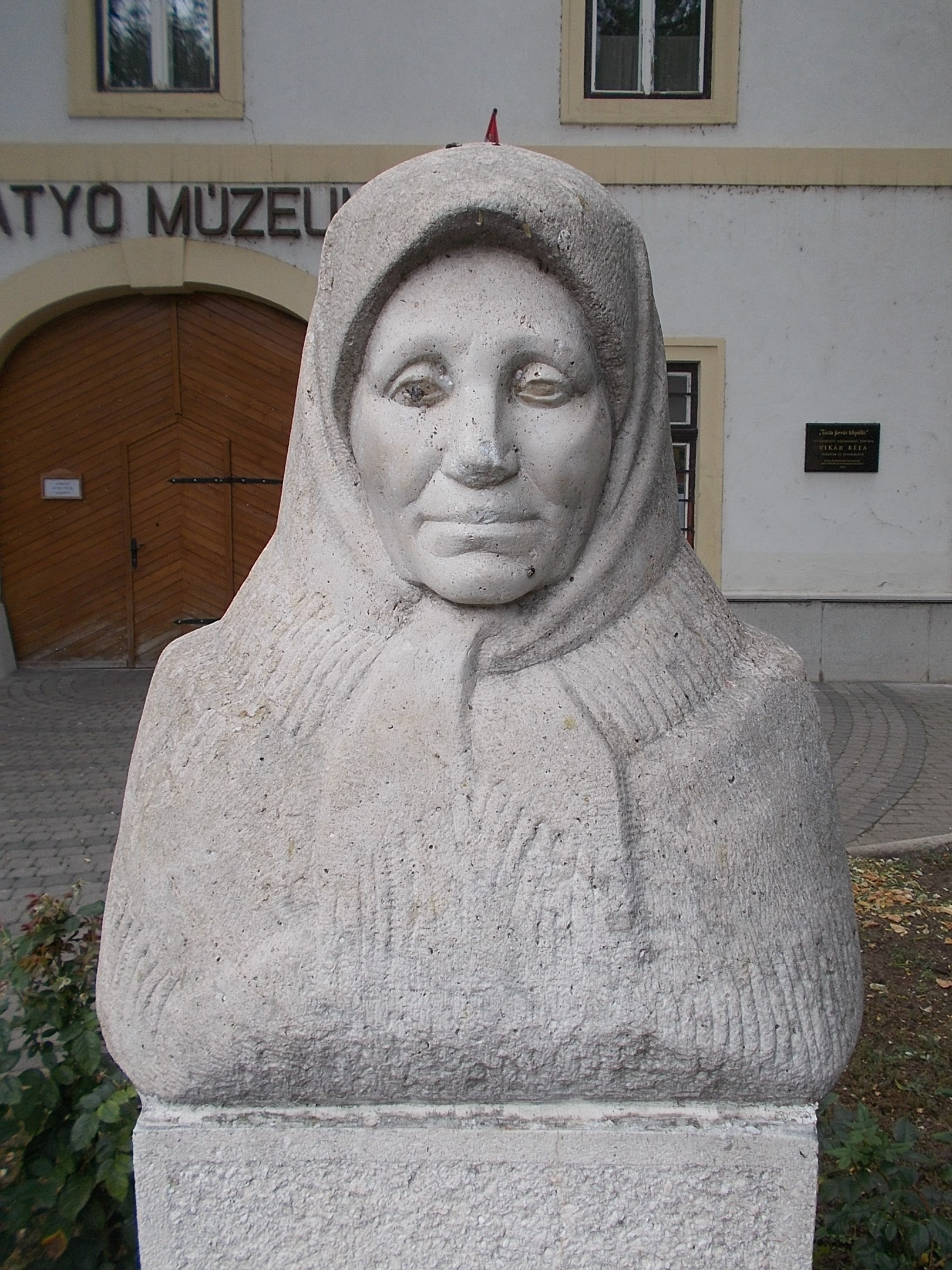
Bust of Kisjankó Bori by József Ács (1969 limestone bust). - Szent László square, Mezőkövesd, Borsod-Abaúj-Zemplén County, Hungary.

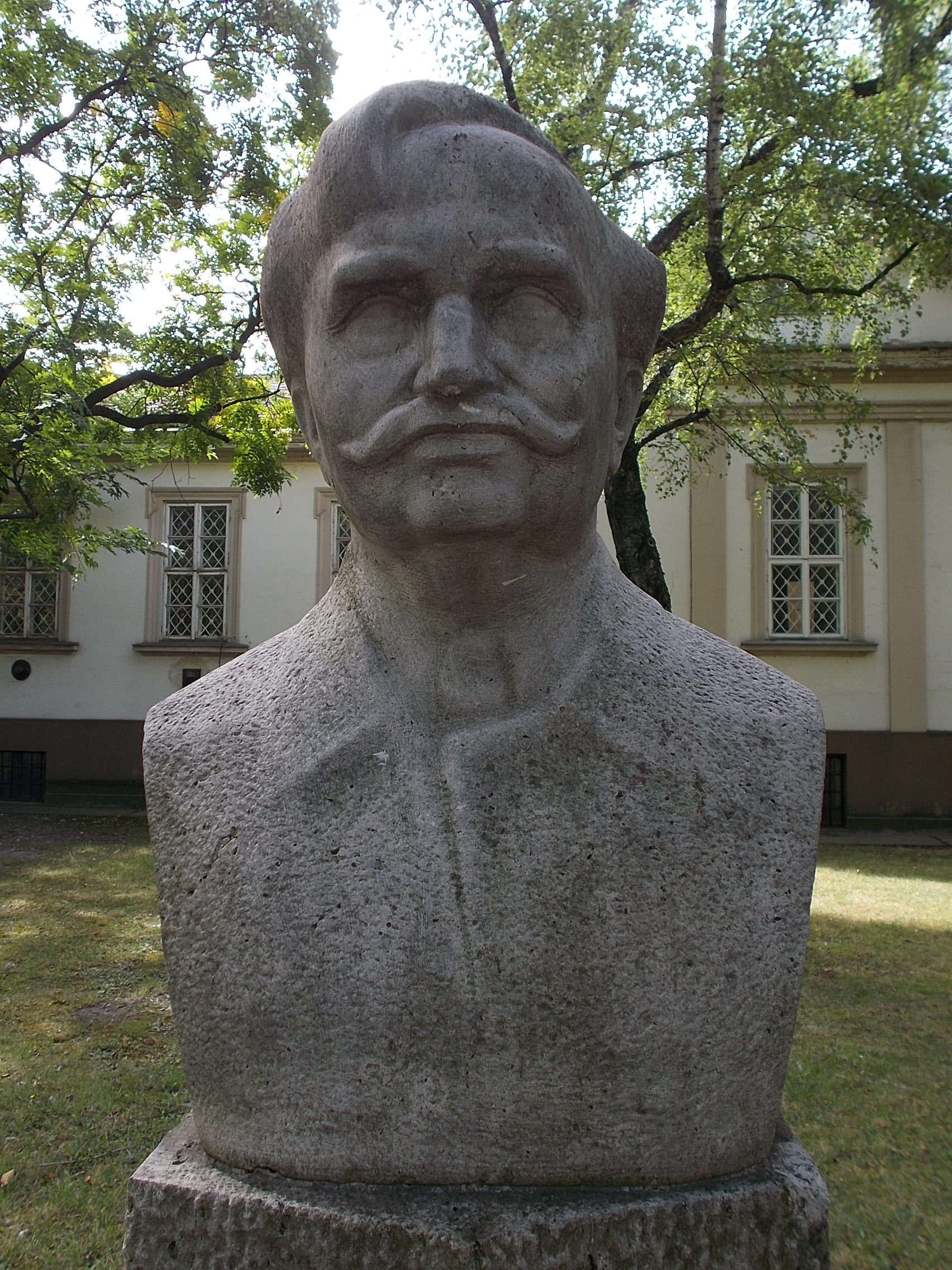
Bust of Imre Révész by József Ács . - Katona József Park, Kecskemét, Bács-Kiskun County, Hungary.

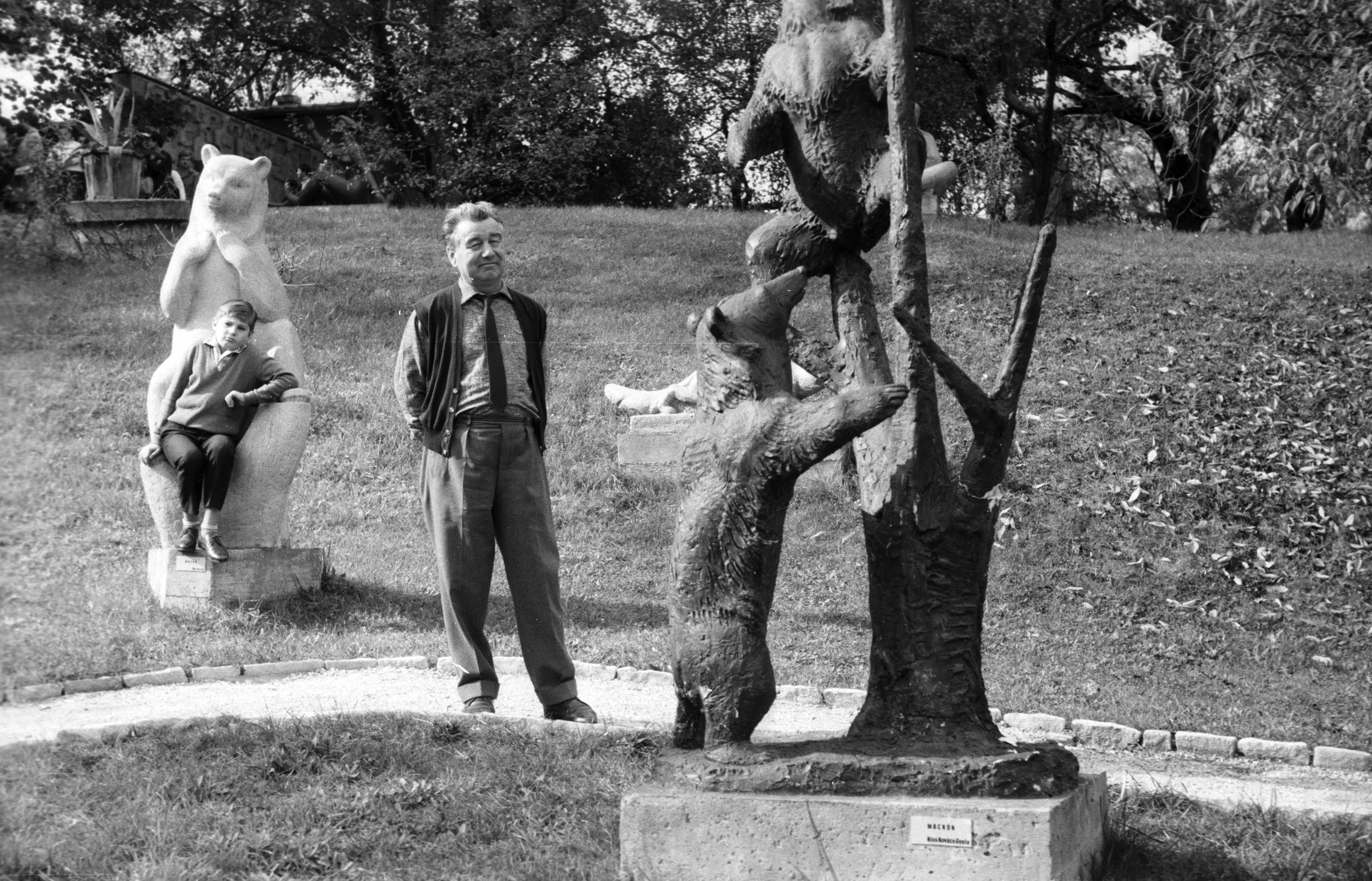
To the left is the statue, "Sitting Bear" by József Ács, Mézes (1961). To the right is the work of Gyula Kiss Kovács, Mackók (1957).
