= Ophiuchus Superbubble =

Astronomical phenomenon

The Ophiuchus Superbubble is an astronomical phenomenon located in the constellation Ophiuchus, with a center around ℓ ≈ 30 °. This giant superbubble was first discovered in a 2007 study of extraplanar neutral hydrogen in the disk-halo transition of the Galaxy. The top extends to galactic latitudes over 25°, a distance of about 7 kpc. The Green Bank radio telescope has measured more than 220,000 HI spectra both in and around this structure.

== Structure ==
The movable 110 meter antenna of a radio telescope made it possible to take pictures of several neighboring regions of the sky, resulting in a folded mosaic in which an area filled with hydrogen was highlighted. Near this area the interstellar gas is disturbed and many ejections are evident.

The total mass of HI in the system is ≈ 10^{6} M☉, with an equal mass of H^{+}. The base of the structure consists of HI "whiskers" measuring several hundred pc wide and its halo extends over more than 1 kpc. The "whiskers" have a vertical density structure suggesting that they are the walls of the bubble and were created by a lateral rather than an upward movement. They resemble the vertical streaks of dust seen on NGC 891.

== Geographical ==
The superbubble is located 23 thousand light-years from the Earth, and the object itself is "raised" 10 thousand light-years above the plane of the galaxy.

According to the Kompaneets model of an expanding bubble, the age of this system is ≈ 30 Ma, and its total energy content is ~ 10^53 erg. It may be at the stage when expansion stops and the shell begins to experience significant instabilities. This system offers an unprecedented opportunity to study several important phenomena at close range, including the evolution of superbubbles, turbulence in the HI shell, and the magnitude of the ionizing flux over the galactic disk.

== Formation hypothesis ==
The superbubble is hypothesized to be based on a massive cluster of young stars. The brightest of these stars exploded one after another, but since bright stars have a short lifespan (about 10 million years), a difference of a couple of million years essentially meant they all exploded at the same time. With a high degree of probability, the matter was "pushed" out of the galactic plane by such explosions, resulting in the inflation of the bubble. The interstellar matter itself is present in most galaxies and is mainly neutral or ionized hydrogen.

Such structures are capable of influencing the distribution of chemical elements in the galaxy: heavy nuclei that are born inside stars are ejected during an explosion together with gas, which - in the form of a "superbubble" - transports them over considerable distances.
