= Acs (surname) =

Ács (or simply Acs, without diacritics) is a Hungarian-language occupational surname literally meaning "carpenter". Notable people with this surname include:

- Gabor Acs (born 1926), Hungarian-born American architect
- Ilona Ács (1920–1976), Hungarian swimmer and Olympics competitor
- István Ács (1928–2018), Hungarian jurist and politician
- Johanna Acs (born 1992), German model and beauty pageant winner
- József Ács (disambiguation), several people
- Oszkár Ács (born 1969), Hungarian bass guitarist
- Péter Ács (born 1981), Hungarian chess grandmaster
- Zoltan Acs (born 1947), Austrian-born Hungarian and American economist
