= Scutum Supershell =

Superbubble in the Scutum-Centaurus arm

Nebula
- Superbubble
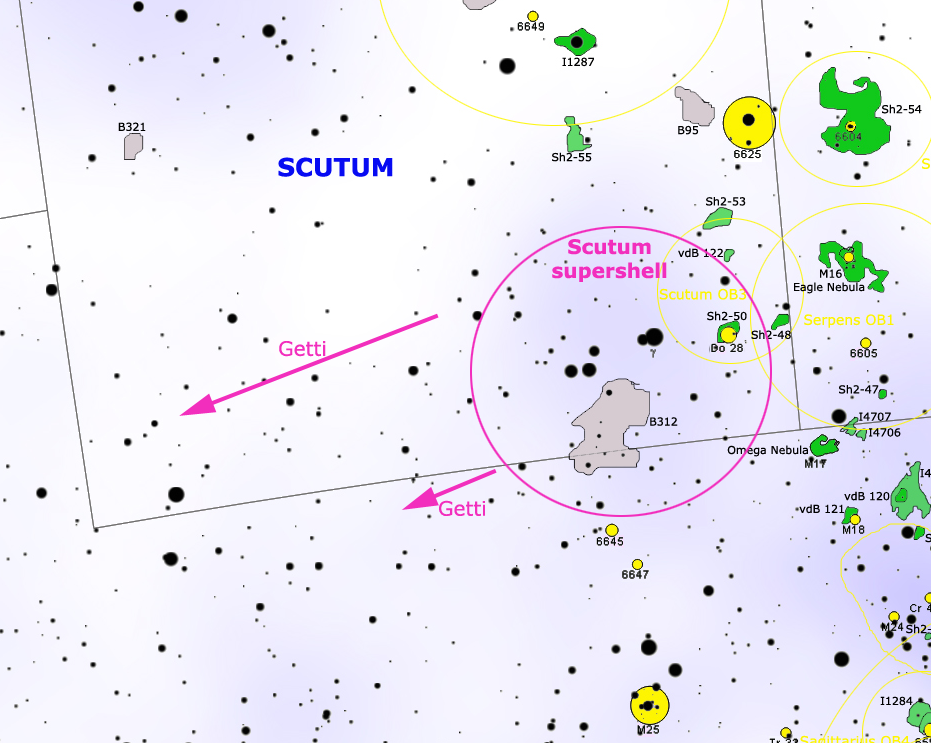
- Location of the Scutum Supershell on a map

Observation data: J2000 epoch
- Right ascension: 18^{h} 42^{m} 00^{s}
- Declination: −18° 00′ 00″
- Distance: ~11,000 ly
- Constellation: Scutum and Sagittarius

Physical characteristics
- Radius: ~472 ly
- Designations: GS 018–04+44

Scutum Supershell (also known as Scutum Superbubble) is a giant expanding bubble of hot gas and hydrogen in space. It is located ~11,000 ly away from the earth inside the Scutum-Centaurus Arm of the Milky Way. The superbubble is formed by exploding stars and strong cosmic winds. It was discovered by astronomer Matthew B. Callaway and his colleagues in 1999.

== Physical Structure ==
Scutum supershell is large and has a diameter of approximately 290 pc and extends about 400 pc from the galactic plane, which was derived from a kinematic distance of 3.3 kpc calculated from using D.P. Clemen's formula. Because the superbubble is not cleary distinguishable, a radius of ~29 pc is estimated. Studies indicate that the infrared emission shows the presence of molecular hydrogen in the high column density regions. The infrared emissions 100 μm and 60 μm are the main emission lines in infrared with surface brightness 6.23 MJy sr⁻¹ and 1.64 MJy sr⁻¹ respectively.

Scutum supershell is mostly visible through H I, with the top of the shell appearing to be blown away, leaving a column of neutral hydrogen (H I) and superheated gas pouring directly into the galactic plane at l = 18° and lying between b = -9° and b = -12°, which created a high-latitude cloud that has a distance of ~630 pc from the galactic plane. The high-latitude cloud has an estimated X-ray luminosity of ~1³⁶ ergs s⁻¹. The high-latitude cloud was formed through supernova remnants, H II regions, and OB associations. Two O-type Blue giant stars HD 175754 (O8II(n)((f))p) and HD 175876 (O6.5III(n)(f)) most likely formed in this very cloud and were ejected from it, or formed recently at their current distance. The Far Ultraviolet Spectroscopic Explorer (FUSE) detected highly ionized absorption lines like O IV, Si IV, and C IV near the blowout spot.

H II regions Sh 2-45 and Sh 2-55 are H II regions that dominate the Hα emissions with the brightest Hα feature located in Sh 2-45 which lies at +20 km s⁻¹. The close proximity of Sh 2-45 causes some confusion regarding membership in the superbubble. Sh 2-55 is most likely in the superbubble, as it has an H I column density of 1.21 x 10²² cm⁻¹ using conversion ratio from Diplas & Savage.

The galactic worms GW 14.9-1.6 and GW 16.9-3.8 are elongated vertical filamentary structures of neutral hydrogen (H I) that form the walls of the superbubble. GW 16.9-3.8 influences the rightmost edge of the bow-shock Hα emission and overlaps with [S II] line emission and both 60μm and 100μm infrared emission. Simulations show that the outflow and bow-shock are likely formed by many supernovae events. X-ray binary LS 5039 is also speculated as the contributing event from the supernova or hypernova and formation of a magnetar or black hole in the system.
