= Carina Flare =

Superbubble in the Carina–Sagittarius arm

Nebula
- Superbubble

Observation data: J2000 epoch
- Right ascension: 10^{h} 56^{m} 30.50^{s}
- Declination: −55° 16′ 35.2″
- Distance: ~8,480±1,305 ly
- Apparent dimensions (V): 750 x 1,174 ly
- Constellation: Carina
- Designations: GSH 287+04−17

Carina Flare is an H I and Molecular Superbubble in the Carina–Sagittarius Arm. The superbubble was discovered in 1999 using the NANTEN telescope by astronomers Yasuo Fukui and a research team from Nagoya University. The superbubble has a high latitude extension and main body.

== Structure ==
Carina Flare has a main body that forms a continuous ring with a gap between l≈289°.5 b≈5°.0 and l≈286°.5 b≈8°.0. This gap is ~200 pc wide with its center located at z ~280 pc. The left edge of the main body is mostly molecular gas in the form of a ridge called GMC G288.5+1.5. This ridge is seen between l≈288°.0 b≈0°.5 and l≈289°.5 b≈2°.0. Two bright HI filaments was seen to curve and meet at the right-hand wall of the main body, extending almost 2° (~90 pc) in length. The molecular clouds have a kinetic temperature of 350–800 K, while approximately 85% of the GMC G288.5+1.5 emission appears to be part of the Carina OB2 Supershell, with the remainder being related to the Carina Flare, this shows a MH2 ≈ 2.0±0.6 x 10⁵ M_{☉}. The main body was identified as having a diameter of ~230 x 360 pc and a distance of 2.6 ± 0.4 kpc. One project used the diameter to determine the Carina Flare is a rare HI-H2 galactic chimney. The western side of the shell has a molecular cloud known as G285.90+4.53 (or Cloud 16) that is ~250 pc above the galactic plane and has 51 clumps. The system temperatures of Cloud 16 range from 150–170 K.

Carina Flare has a gap that connects to the high latitude extension feature. Here the low brightness cavity extends almost 3° (~130 pc), the high latitude extension also has a faint cap at l≈289°.5 b≈9°.0 which corresponds to an altitude of z ~400 pc above the galactic plane. The extent of the cap is not known because it appears to blend in with the emissions from the surrounding regions like the Carina Nebula. The most prominent part of the high latitude extension is the HI–CO complex at l≈287° b≈9°. This structure has a sharp pointed tip located where the molecular component is concentrated, but flares out to the right extending over 4° (~200 pc) in length. The HI structures in the cap were identified to be part of the Carina Flare. This makes the Carina Flare superbubble one of the only galactic shells in which a part of the ionized component has been positively identified.
