= Carina OB2 =

OB association

Carina OB2 is a giant OB association in the constellation Carina. It contains anywhere from 91 to 157 stars, many of which are hot blue stars of spectral types B and O. It is located 3.1 kiloparsecs distant and is around 4 million years old.
