= N44 (emission nebula) =

Emission nebula in the constellation Dorado

Emission nebula
- superbubble
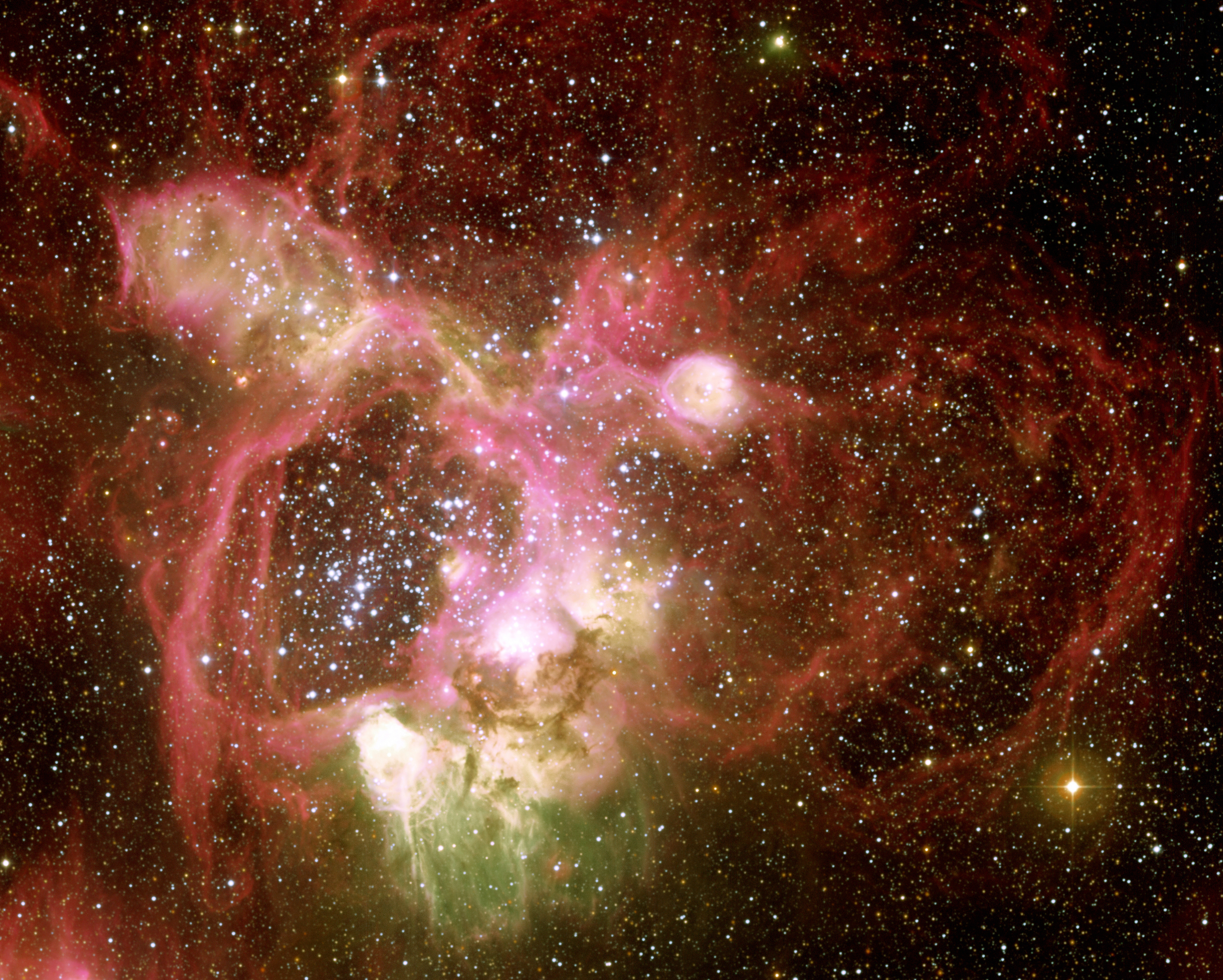
- The central region of N44

Observation data: J2000.0 epoch
- Right ascension: 05^{h} 22^{m} 06.9^{s}
- Declination: −67° 56′ 46″
- Distance: ~160,000-170,000 ly
- Constellation: Dorado

Physical characteristics
- Radius: ~500 ly

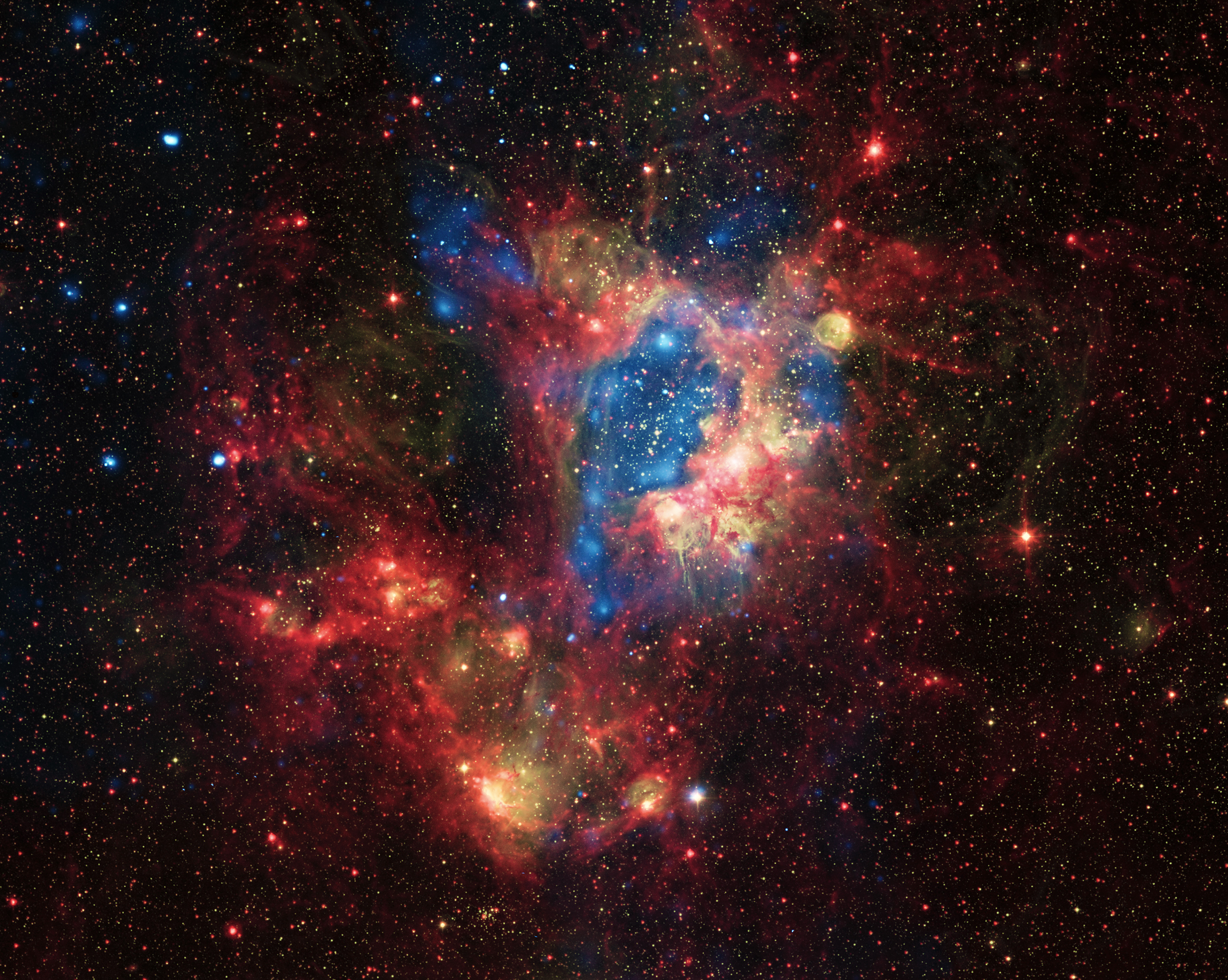
Picture combining views of N44 in visible light with images in infrared light and X-rays.

N44 is an emission nebula with superbubble structure located in the Large Magellanic Cloud, a satellite galaxy of the Milky Way in the constellation Dorado. Originally catalogued in Karl Henize's "Catalogue of H-alpha emission stars and nebulae in the Magellanic Clouds" of 1956, it is approximately 1,000 light-years wide and 160,000-170,000 light-years distant. N44 has a smaller bubble structure inside known as N44F. The superbubble structure of N44 itself is shaped by the radiation pressure of a 40-star group located near its center; the stars are blue-white, very luminous, and incredibly powerful. N44F has been shaped in a similar manner; it has a hot, massive central star with an unusually powerful stellar wind that moves at 7 million kilometers per hour. This is because it loses material at 100 million times the rate of the Sun, or approximately 1,000,000,000,000,000 tons per year. However, varying density in the N44 nebula has caused the formation of several dust pillars that may conceal star formation. This variable density is likely caused by previous supernovae in the vicinity of N44; many of the stars that have shaped it will eventually also end as supernovae. The past effects of supernovae are also confirmed by the fact that N44 emits x-rays.

N44 is classified as an emission nebula because it contains large regions of ionized hydrogen. However, the three strongest emission lines in the nebula are singly ionized oxygen atoms, which emit at an ultraviolet wavelength of 372.7 nm, doubly-ionized oxygen atoms, which emit at a blue-green wavelength of 500.7 nm, and neutral hydrogen atoms, which emit the hydrogen-alpha line at a red wavelength of 656.2 nm.

== Gallery ==
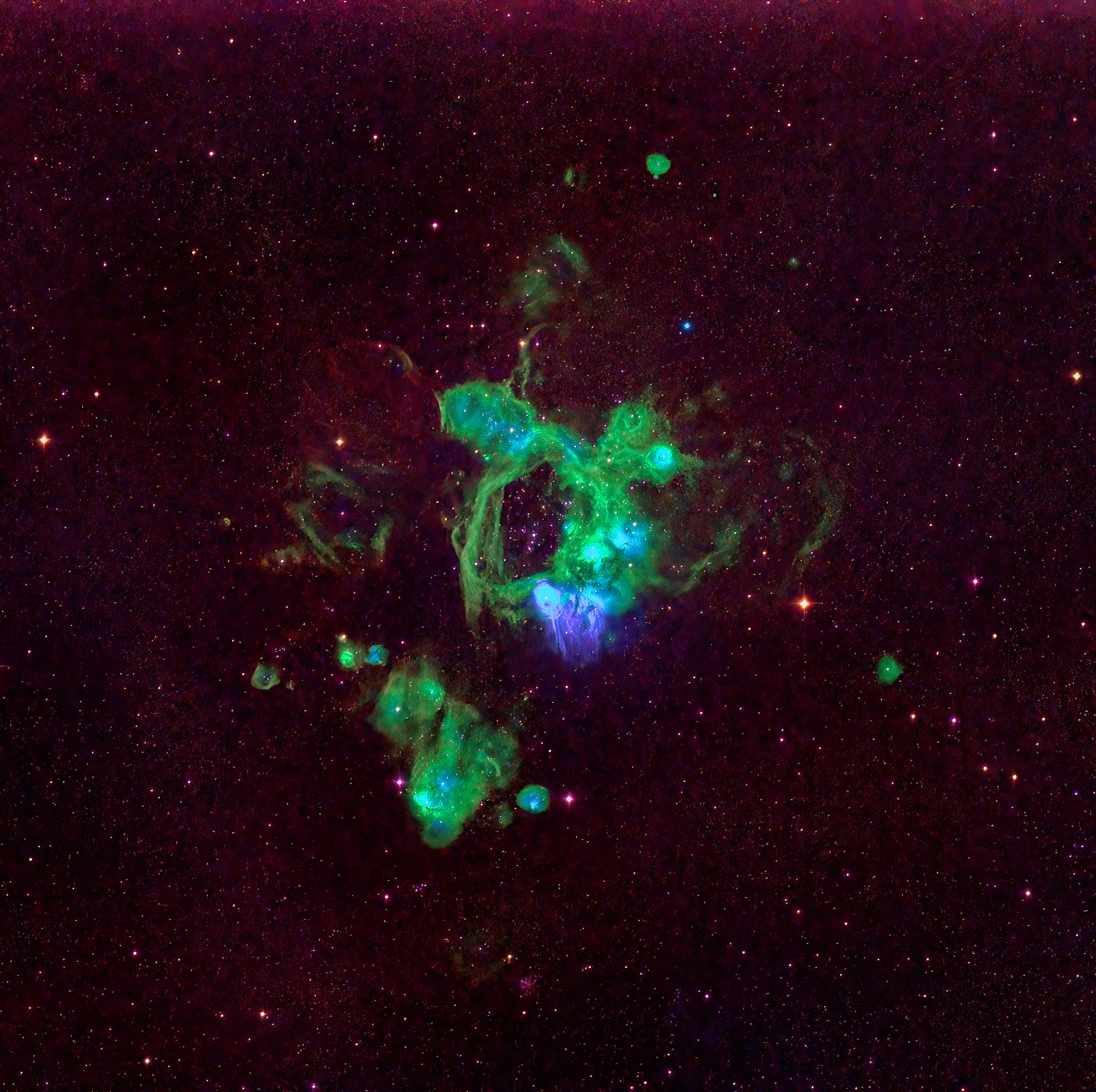
Amateur astronomer Ha/OIII/SII photo of N44
