= József Ács (painter) =

Yugoslav painter

József Ács (1914–1990) was a Yugoslav painter, art teacher and art critic. From 1953 to 1956 he was rector of the School of Applied Arts in Novi Sad, after which he was art critic for the daily newspaper Magyar Szó for the Hungarians of Vojvodina. In his paintings, Ács went through several stages of development, from Post-Impressionism to Surrealism. He exhibited outside Yugoslavia in places like Paris, Vienna, Szeged, Modena, Regensburg and Stuttgart.
