= Skyeton Raybird-3 =

Unmanned aircraft system

Raybird / ACS-3
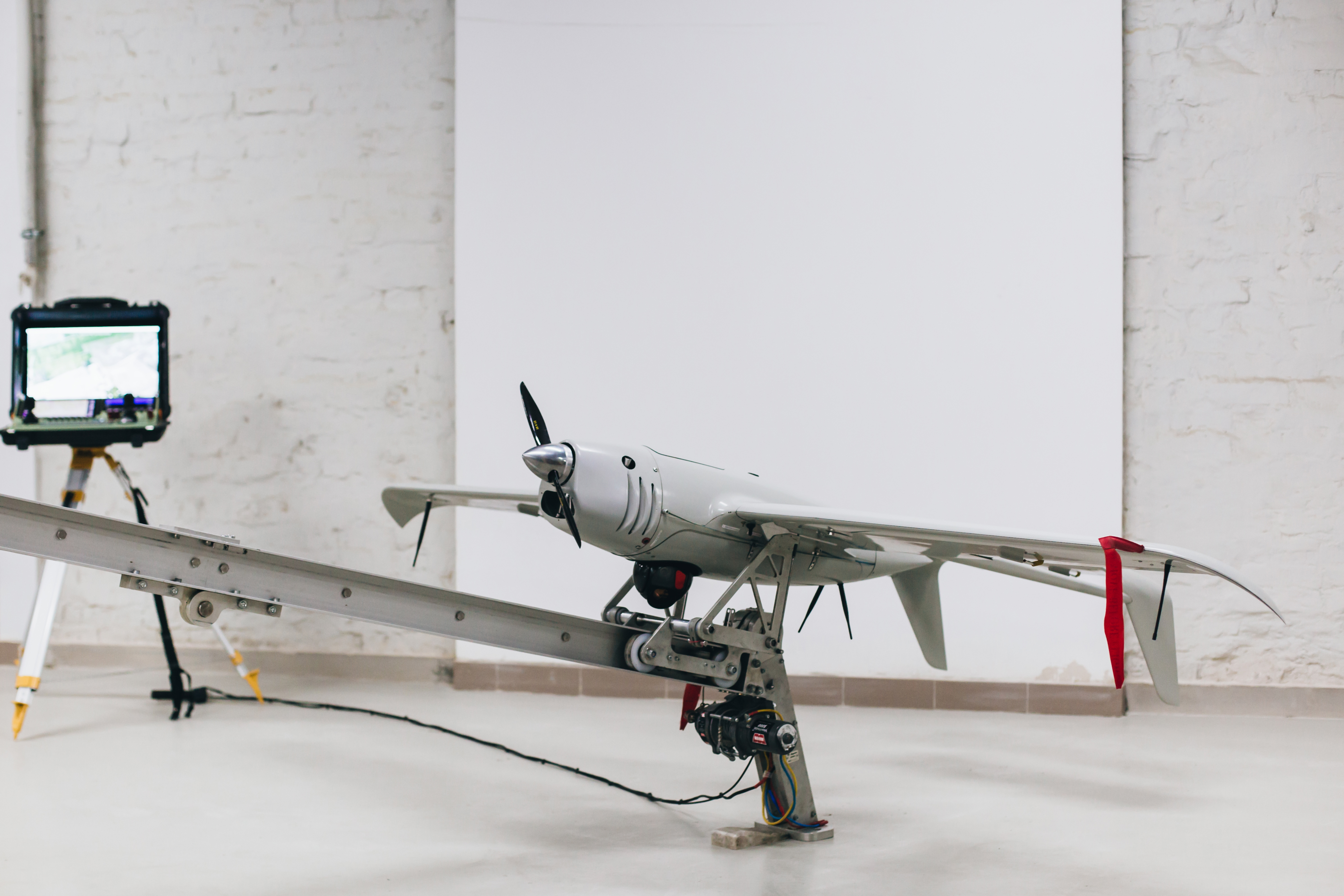
- Raybird in the starting position

General information
- Type: Unmanned aircraft system
- National origin: Ukraine
- Manufacturer: APC "Skyeton"
- Status: In service

Raybird (ACS-3) is an unmanned aircraft system designed for various long-term missions and ISTAR operations. It corresponds to the class I of NATO classification and the Armed Forces of Ukraine. (Note: Takeoff weight up to 150 kg, small tactical UAV.) Created by APC "Skyeton". Raybird is the name of the aviation system for dual-use; ACS-3 is the name of the military version.

== History of UAV creation and development ==
In 2014, the first prototype of fixed-wing UAV was developed, with a gasoline engine for surveillance and inspection missions.

Later, a number of state tests confirmed that the complex carries out necessary tasks in the conditions of counteraction to electronic warfare (EW) and meets the requirements for tactical drones.

In October 2020, an upgraded modification of the ACS-3M was introduced with a new injector engine, improved software, and an ability to mount a small radar with a synthesized aperture.

In March 2021, the launch of a UAV from a moving object (vehicle in motion) was demonstrated.

Since 2016, the UAV has been allowed to operate in the Armed Forces of Ukraine. Also, the UAV manufacturer is included in the register of executors of the state defense order of Ukraine.

== Design ==
Unmanned aerial system Raybird consists of an unmanned aerial vehicle, a portable ground control station, an antenna, and a catapult. (Note: Andriy Berezhnyi informs about ACS-3 in an extended configuration: 4 unmanned aerial vehicles, 2 ground control stations, 2 launch catapults, 2 transport bases (car), spare parts, tools and accessories, operational documentation.) The whole complex is transported in four containers. It takes less than 20 minutes to start.

UAV power plant is a single-cylinder four-stroke gasoline engine GF40 injector type with a capacity of 40 cm^{3} (manufactured by OS Engines), which drives the propeller. The engine operates in temperatures from −25 to +45 °C, its power is 3.8 hp (2.8 kW). The aircraft is launched by a mechanical catapult with a starting speed of 55 km/h. It lands on a parachute.

The UAV does not require manual entry of coordinates, flies on a pre-programmed route, and returns to the operator. The operator does not need to directly control the aircraft and the whole system operators under autopilot command at all times. The maximum distance of the control link is 240 km. In offline mode Raybird flies 2.5 thousand km at a maximum radius of 1 thousand km. Any number of aircraft can be connected to the control station, any number of operators can be connected to one aircraft.

=== Specifications of Raybird (modification of ACS-3M) ===
Name characteristics	Indicator
Wingspan	2960 mm
Flight altitude	up to 5.5 km
Flight duration	28+ hours
Speed (min / cruising / max)	80/110/140 km/h
Maximum takeoff weight	23 kg
Payload	up to 10 kg

== Areas of application ==
External videos
- Ukrainian Army UAV (9 series of TV show "Polygon" on UATV Channel) on YouTube
- ACS-3 from Skyeton: what a unique Ukrainian UAV is capable of (on Defense Express Channel) on YouTube
- Dünyanin en i̇yi̇ askeri s i̇haları (The world's best military drones) (on Tekno Trend Channel) on YouTube

The UAV can be used in a number of commercial and military tasks:

- Aerial photography
- Fire prevention
- Mapping
- Search and rescue operations
- ISTAR mission etc.
