= Anticenter shell =

Ordinary object

Anticenter Shell
Superbubble

Observation data: B1950.0 epoch
- Right ascension: 06^{h} 27^{m}
- Declination: +15°
- Distance: 55 k ly (17 k pc)
- Constellation: Orion and Gemini

The anticenter shell or anticenter superbubble is a region near the anticenter of the Milky Way Galaxy that emits 21 cm radiation. It is located at 06^{h} 27^{m} +15°, or l = 197°, b = +2° in galactic coordinates, near the border of the constellations Gemini and Orion. It is a supershell (a very large superbubble) within our galaxy that is spherical in shape and features jets of gas.

Discovered in 1970, this galactic object has subsequently been variously classified by researchers as a spiral arm of the Milky Way in 1972, a nearby tidally-stripped dwarf galaxy in 1975, and a high-velocity cloud in 1979.

The name Snickers for the anticenter shell arose from the description in 1975 by Christian Simonson, a University of Maryland astronomer who believed it to be a small "peanut" of a galaxy just outside the Milky Way. Simonson's colleagues coined the name Snickers (in reference to the American chocolate bars Milky Way and Snickers) due to its proximity to the Milky Way. Less popularly, the anticenter superbubble is also referred to as 0627-15 from its equatorial coordinates.

The anticenter shell is approximately 55,000 light years (17 kpc) from the Sun. Its dimensions are difficult to determine by radio observation due to its location near the Zone of Avoidance, the regions of the sky obscured by interstellar dust along the galactic equator.

== See also ==
- List of stellar streams
