= Kisjankó Bori =

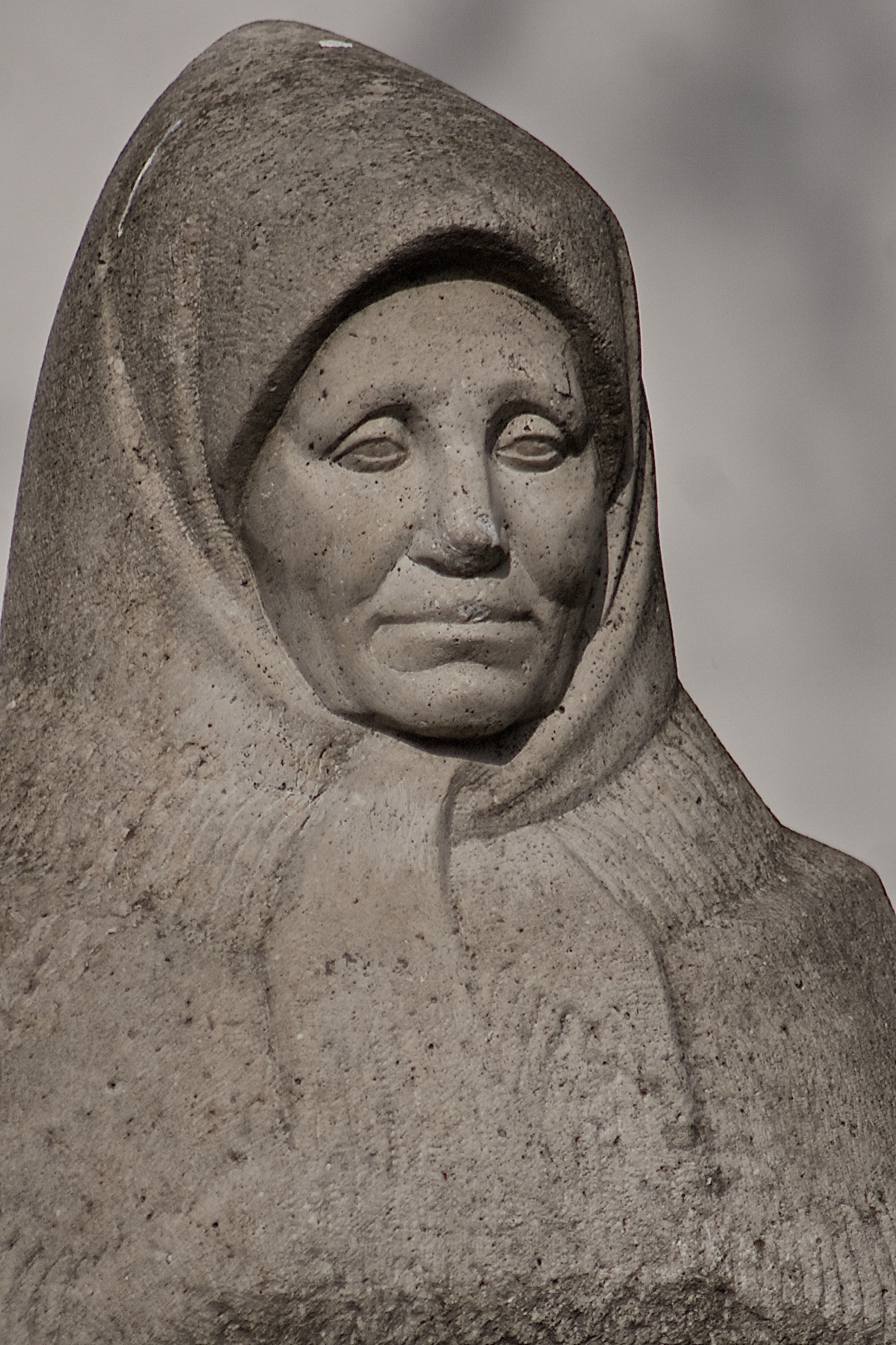
- Born: Borbála Molnár; 27 August 1876; Mezőkövesd, Hungary
- Died: 14 July 1954 (aged 77); Mezőkövesd, Hungary
- Occupation: folk embroiderer

Kisjankó Bori (27 August 1876 – 14 July 1954) was a Hungarian folk embroiderer.

== Biography ==
Bori was born as Borbála Molnár. Her grandfather, János Nagy, was a furrier. Due to his short stature, he was given the nickname Kisjankó. His daughter, Bori, worked in a store, and additionally embroidered and designed patterns. Her talent was inherited by her daughter Barbara Molnár, then Mártan Gaspar. After getting married, she gave birth to six children, two of whom died. She raised 4 sons. She designed new patterns. For her works, she was awarded the title of Master of Folk Art. In 2012, the art of the Matyó people, including folk embroidery, was added by UNESCO to the UNESCO Intangible Cultural Heritage Lists.

== Heritage ==
One of her descendants, physical education teacher Gáspár Gábor, on the basis of original drawings, patterns, embroidery and compositions, in 2017, in cooperation with Anna Burda, created a collection of clothes and souvenirs, which he named Kissing Roses-original matyó composition by Kisjankó Bori. Anna is a Hungarian designer who designed a collection of clothes for the Hungarian national team for the 2000 Summer Olympics.
