= Automobile Club of Switzerland =

Non-profit association

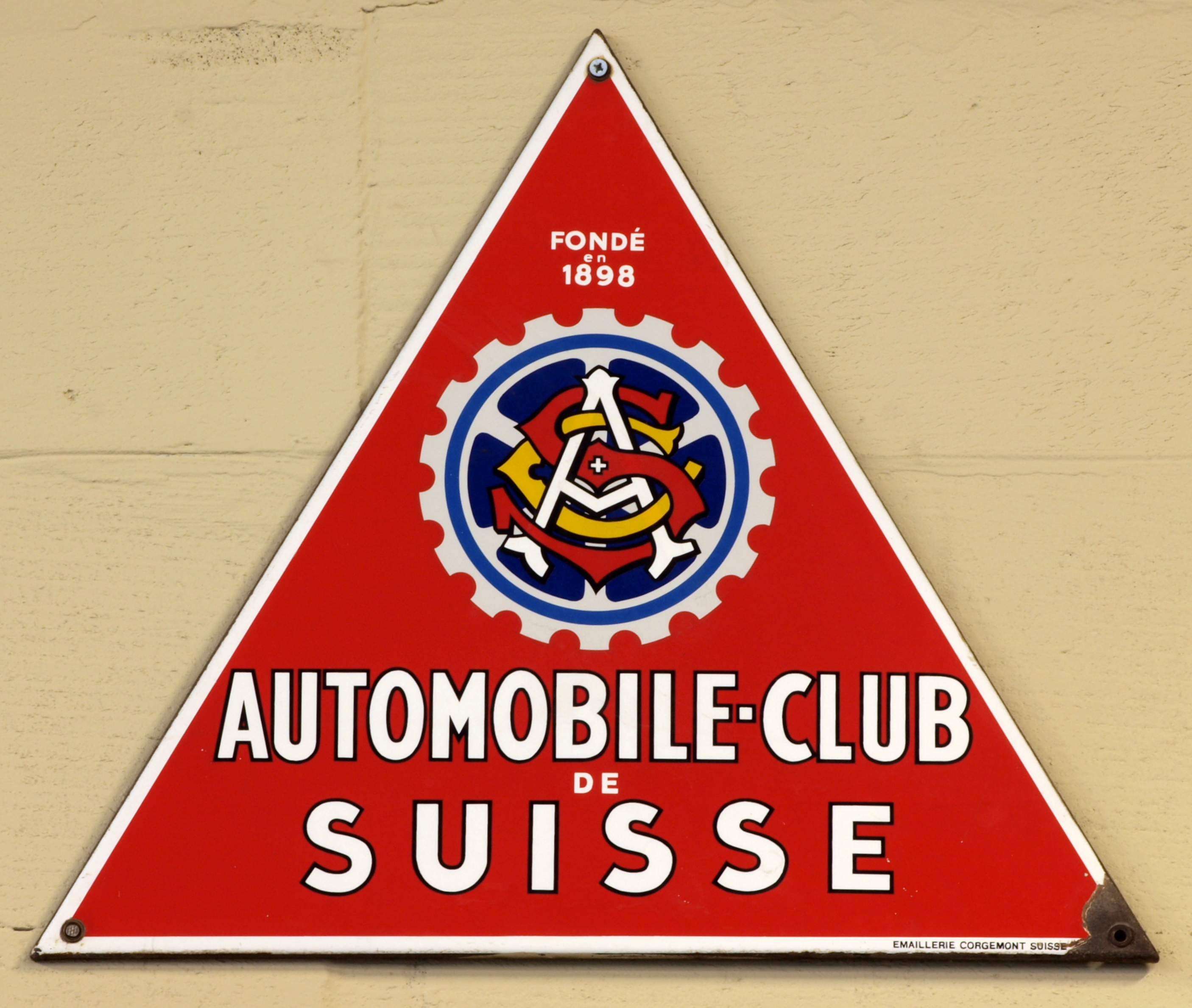
- Type: Automotive and Sports Association
- Founded: 6 December 1898
- Headquarters: Bern, Switzerland
- Key people: Thomas Hurter (President)

The Automobile Club of Switzerland (German: Automobil Club der Schweiz, French: Automobile Club suisse, Italian: Automobile Club svizzero; ACS) is a Swiss motorsport association founded in 1898. The association, co-founder of the International Automobile Federation, aims to defend the interests of motorists in transport policies, promote road safety and motor sports, and provide services to members.

== History ==
The ACS was founded on December 6, 1898, in Geneva, on the initiative of a group of members of the Touring Club Suisse who had switched from bicycles to cars. In its first decades of activity, the association's efforts were also aimed at promoting the acceptance of the new means of transport among the population and regulating road traffic.

In 1901 it organized the first time trial race in the Canton of Vaud and, starting in 1903, the association began to establish itself in the area with the birth of the local/cantonal sections of Basel and Montreux, and then extended its presence throughout the territory of the Confederation. In 1904 he participated in the founding congress in Paris of the Association Internationale des Automobile Clubs Reconnus, which later became the FIA.

The association co-founded the International Automobile Federation.

== Organization and aims ==
The Automobil Club der Schweiz / Automobile Club de Suisse (ACS) is based in Bern and comprises 19 autonomous sections, established on a cantonal/intercantonal basis, as well as a section in Liechtenstein.

The association aims to defend the interests of motorists in transport policies, promote road safety and motor sports, and provide services to members.
