= József Ács (author) =

Hungarian writer (born 1965)

József Ács (born 1965) is a Hungarian writer. Ács studied physics at the Eötvös Loránd University in Budapest. He completed his studies in 1990 and has since worked as a programmer. In 2004, he received the Nizzai-Kavics Poetry Prize, and since his poetry, prose, short plays and essays have appeared regularly in the monthly magazine Liget. Among his works are Helyben vagyunk (1993), Világítóudvar (2001), Orfeum az alvilágba (2005) and Történetek életre-halálra (2008).
