= Galactic anticenter =

Direction in space opposite the Galactic Center from Earth

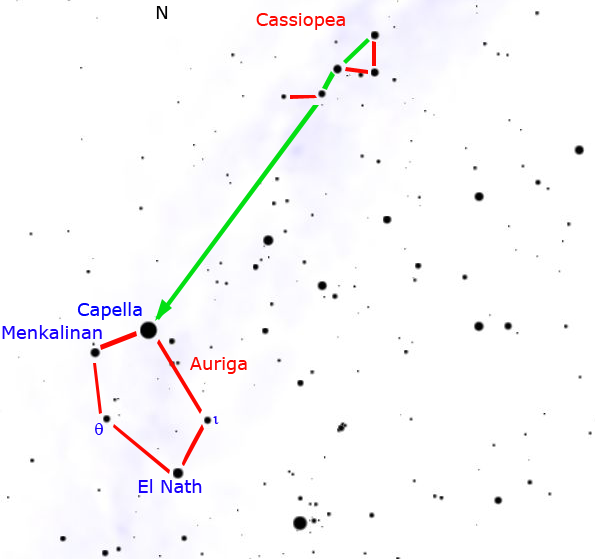
Map of the constellation Auriga, with Elnath at the bottom of the ring

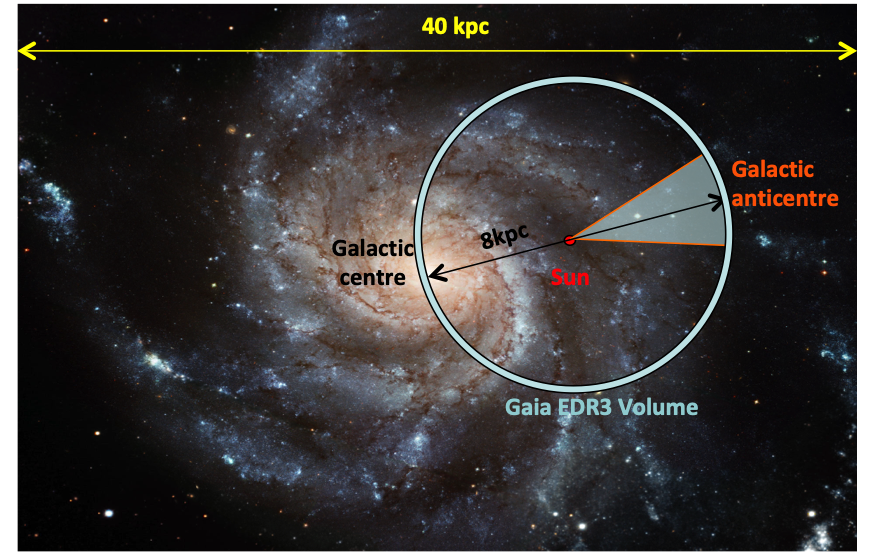
The Galactic Center and its anticenter from Earth's perspective

The galactic anticenter is a direction in space directly opposite to the Galactic Center, as viewed from Earth. This direction corresponds to a point on the celestial sphere.

From the perspective of an observer on Earth, the galactic anticenter is located in the constellation Auriga, and the Crab Nebula and the bright star Beta Tauri (Elnath) appear nearest this point. For binocular and telescope observers in dark sky locations, the magnitude 8.5 star HIP 27180 appears closest to this point.

== Location ==
In terms of the galactic coordinate system, the Galactic Center (in Sagittarius) corresponds to a longitude of 0°, while the anticenter is located exactly at 180°. In the equatorial coordinate system, the anticenter is found at roughly RA 05h 46m, dec +28° 56'.

== See also ==
- Anticenter shell
