= Perseus-Taurus Shell =

Cavity in the Orion arm

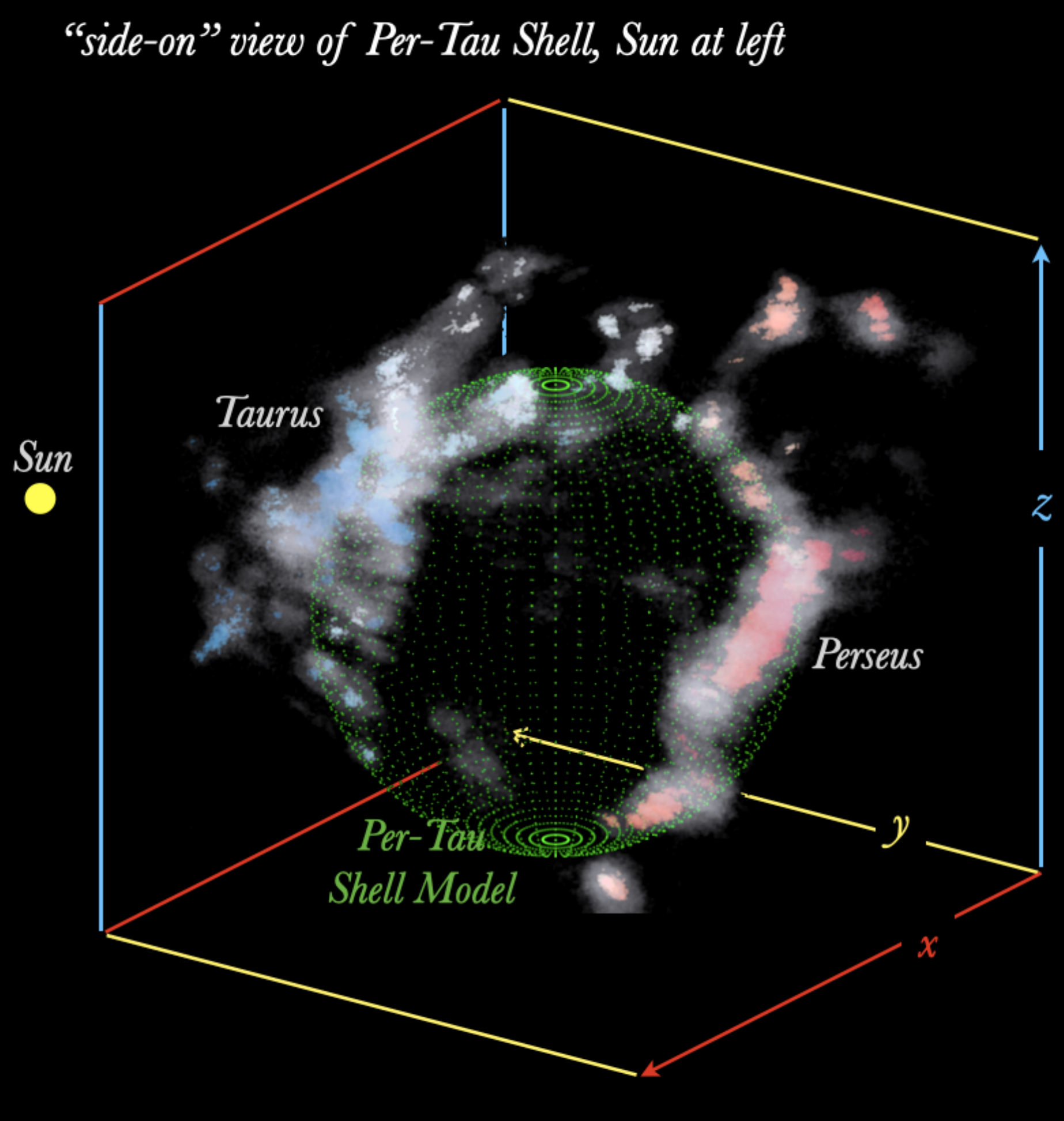
Side-on 3D view of the Per-Tau Shell, giant structure forming star-forming molecular clouds

The Perseus-Taurus Shell (also shortened to the Per-Tau shell) is a near-spherical cavity in the interstellar medium, 500 light-years wide, located in the Milky Way in the direction of the constellations Perseus and Taurus. A team from the Harvard Smithsonian Center for Astrophysics led by Catherine Zucker and Shmuel Bialy discovered the structure in 2021. Scientists believe that it appeared following the explosions of ancient supernovae. Molecular clouds surround the sphere-shape cavity.
