= Advanced Contact Solutions =

Philippine business process outsourcing company

Advanced Contact Solutions, Inc.
- Type: Public
- Industry: Business Process Outsourcing
- Founded: Metro Manila (1996)
- Defunct: 2010
- Headquarters: Makati, Philippines
- Number of locations: 5
- Area served: Multi-national
- Key people: Victor Joseph L. Estacio, MBA (President and CEO); Louis Carson B. Ganancial, PhD (Vice President for Business Research and Development); Kevin Michael James N. Fetalver (COO); Denise Alyssa B. Nadela, CPA (CFO); Haidee Elizabeth C. Enriquez (Vice President for Human Relations); Maxine Carlyle P. Salcedo (CMO)
- Services: Inbound; Outbound; Market Research
- Owner: Paxys Solutions Corporation

Advanced Contact Solutions, Inc. (ACS) is a business process outsourcing (BPO) company based in the Philippines.

== History ==
ACS started as a single-site, single-client company with only 300 seats in 1996 to five sites with 7,000 seats. ACS is the first publicly listed call center in the Philippine Stock Exchange. Its parent company is Paxys Solutions Corp. Also, ACS is an ISO 9001:2000 Quality Systems Certified. ACS provided services to companies in the United States, Canada, Australia, United Kingdom, and the Philippines.

Advanced Contact Solutions manages five call centres with about 7,000 seats in various cities in and near Manila, including Makati, Quezon City, and Lipa City. ACS is considered to be one of the 39 largest call centres in the Philippines. In 2007, ACS had a revenue of P2.6 billion. The company handled inbound calls and electronic mail from customers, provide outbound telemarketing services.

Advanced Contact Solutions is an active member of Contact Center Association of the Philippines (CCAP) and the Business Process Association of the Philippines (BPAP). ACS is a member of the American and British Chamber of Commerce in the Philippines. ACS is also a member of international associations such as American Teleservices Association (ATA), Direct Marketing Association (DMA), and The Society of Consumer Affairs Professionals Business (SOCAP) and others.

In November 2008, the company dismissed 889 employees (about one-fifth of its manpower) as it suffered a net loss of P100 million with revenues of P1.48 billion. The decision was prompted by diminishing business volume due to the 2008 financial crisis as well as emergence from bankruptcy of one of its business clients. The Philippine Stock Exchange said that Paxys had divested its callcenter, salary packaging, IT consulting, and software business.

== Technology ==
ACS has partnered with multiple carriers — both international and domestic. The company partnered with major US-based and Philippine telecommunication carriers using point-to-point DS3, E1, and T1 circuits.
