= List of stars in Ara =

This is the list of notable stars in the constellation Ara, sorted by decreasing brightness.

Name	B	Var	HD	HIP	RA	Dec	vis. mag.	abs. mag.	Dist. (ly)	Sp. class	Notes
β Ara	β		157244	85258	17^{h} 25^{m} 18.00^{s}	−55° 31′ 47.4″	2.84	−3.49	603	K0/1Ib	
α Ara	α		158427	85792	17^{h} 31^{m} 50.52^{s}	−49° 52′ 33.5″	2.84	−1.51	242	B2Vne	Choo, Tchou; λ Eri and γ Cas variable, V_{max} = 2.73^{m}, V_{min} = 3.00^{m}, P = 0.98127 d
ζ Ara	ζ		152786	83081	16^{h} 58^{m} 37.23^{s}	−55° 59′ 24.2″	3.12	−3.11	574	K5III	
γ Ara	γ		157246	85267	17^{h} 25^{m} 23.66^{s}	−56° 22′ 39.7″	3.31	−4.40	1136	B1Ib	
δ Ara	δ		158094	85727	17^{h} 31^{m} 05.98^{s}	−60° 41′ 01.0″	3.60	−0.19	187	B8V	
θ Ara	θ		165024	88714	18^{h} 06^{m} 37.88^{s}	−50° 05′ 29.2″	3.65	−3.81	1012	B2Ib	
η Ara	η		151249	82363	16^{h} 49^{m} 47.11^{s}	−59° 02′ 28.7″	3.77	−1.14	313	K5III	binary star
ε^{1} Ara	ε^{1}		152980	83153	16^{h} 59^{m} 35.05^{s}	−53° 09′ 37.8″	4.06	−0.79	304	K4III	
σ Ara	σ		159217	86092	17^{h} 35^{m} 39.61^{s}	−46° 30′ 20.1″	4.56	−0.80	385	A0V	
λ Ara	λ		160032	86486	17^{h} 40^{m} 23.73^{s}	−49° 24′ 54.6″	4.76	3.06	71	F3IV	suspected δ Sct variable
μ Ara	μ		160691	86796	17^{h} 44^{m} 08.72^{s}	−51° 50′ 00.9″	5.12	4.20	50	G3IV-V	Cervantes, has four planets (b, c, d, & e)
κ Ara	κ		157457	85312	17^{h} 26^{m} 00.03^{s}	−50° 38′ 00.7″	5.19	−0.24	398	K1III	a triple star system.
ι Ara	ι		157042	85079	17^{h} 23^{m} 16.08^{s}	−47° 28′ 05.4″	5.21	−1.51	721	B2IIIne	Be star, V_{max} = 5.18^{m}, V_{min} = 5.26^{m}, P = 0.5565 d
π Ara	π		159492	86305	17^{h} 38^{m} 05.57^{s}	−54° 30′ 00.3″	5.25	2.12	137	A7V	
ε^{2} Ara	ε^{2}		153580	83431	17^{h} 03^{m} 08.71^{s}	−53° 14′ 11.9″	5.27	3.17	86	F6V	
HD 157661			157661	85389	17^{h} 26^{m} 51.98^{s}	−45° 50′ 34.7″	5.28	−1.04	599	B8V	multiple star system
41 G. Ara			156274	84720	17^{h} 19^{m} 02.95^{s}	−46° 38′ 11.4″	5.47	5.75	29	G8V	binary star; suspected variable
ρ^{2}	ρ^{2}		152824	83057	16^{h} 58^{m} 17.95^{s}	−50° 38′ 27.9″	5.53	−0.50	523	B9IV	
HD 150898			150898	82171	16^{h} 47^{m} 19.66^{s}	−58° 20′ 29.0″	5.55	−3.48	2090	B0Iab	suspected variable
HD 150168	(φ) (Note: Labelled Phi Normae (φ Nor/φ Normae) by Bode in his Uranographia)		150168	81733	16^{h} 41^{m} 40.23^{s}	−49° 39′ 05.6″	5.62	−4.38	3260	B1II	
HD 153053			153053	83187	17^{h} 00^{m} 06.29^{s}	−54° 35′ 49.2″	5.64	2.12	165	A3V	
HD 150136			150136	81702	16^{h} 41^{m} 20.42^{s}	−48° 45′ 46.7″	5.65			O3.5If*+O6V	triple star; suspected rotating ellipsoidal variable, ΔV = 0.03^{m}
V539 Ara	ν^{1}	V539	161783	87314	17^{h} 50^{m} 28.39^{s}	−53° 36′ 44.6″	5.68	−1.33	823	B2V + B3V	Algol variable and slowly pulsating B star, V_{max} = 5.71^{m}, V_{min} = 6.24^{m}, P = 3.169094 d
HD 156838			156838	85147	17^{h} 24^{m} 01.08^{s}	−62° 51′ 50.9″	5.69	−2.82	1638	B2IV	
HD 157753	ω^{2} (Note: Labelled Omega^{2} Arae (ω^{2} Ara/ω^{2} Arae) by Bode in his Uranographia)		157753	85470	17^{h} 27^{m} 57.62^{s}	−52° 17′ 49.3″	5.72	0.81	312	K2III	
HD 153716	τ (Note: Labelled Tau Arae (τ Ara/τ Arae) by Bode in his Uranographia)		153716	83535	17^{h} 04^{m} 24.73^{s}	−57° 42′ 43.6″	5.73	−1.00	723	B5IV	
HD 150745			150745	82110	16^{h} 46^{m} 21.23^{s}	−58° 30′ 12.8″	5.74	−1.31	838	B2IV-V	
HD 156854			156854	85068	17^{h} 23^{m} 07.11^{s}	−56° 31′ 32.0″	5.76	0.27	409	G8/K0III	
HD 156942			156942	85169	17^{h} 24^{m} 18.80^{s}	−60° 40′ 25.6″	5.76	−0.92	706	B8Ib/II	
HD 160263			160263	86552	17^{h} 41^{m} 16.23^{s}	−46° 55′ 18.5″	5.78	−0.75	660	A0V	
HD 156768			156768	85049	17^{h} 22^{m} 55.23^{s}	−58° 00′ 37.0″	5.86	−1.05	786	G8Ib/II	
HD 154903			154903	84248	17^{h} 13^{m} 18.11^{s}	−67° 11′ 46.9″	5.87	0.87	327	K0III-IV	
HD 159463			159463	86248	17^{h} 37^{m} 27.31^{s}	−50° 03′ 34.1″	5.89	0.76	346	K0III-IV	
HD 157662			157662	85409	17^{h} 27^{m} 12.46^{s}	−50° 37′ 49.3″	5.90	−2.65	1672	B9II	
HD 151967			151967	82672	16^{h} 54^{m} 00.40^{s}	−57° 54′ 33.2″	5.91	−0.71	688	M0III	semiregular variable
HD 156091	ψ (Note: Labelled Psi Arae (ψ Ara/ψ Arae) by Bode in his Uranographia)		156091	84731	17^{h} 19^{m} 12.51^{s}	−59° 41′ 40.5″	5.93	−3.06	2050	K2IIICN...	
HD 157819			157819	85520	17^{h} 28^{m} 38.91^{s}	−55° 10′ 10.8″	5.93	−1.27	898	G8II/III	Binary
HD 152527			152527	82902	16^{h} 56^{m} 28.80^{s}	−52° 17′ 01.1″	5.94	1.01	315	A0III	
V854 Ara		V854	155035	84105	17^{h} 11^{m} 38.67^{s}	−48° 52′ 24.2″	5.94	−1.09	830	M1/M2III	slow irregular variable
V862 Ara		V862	158220	85751	17^{h} 31^{m} 23.28^{s}	−56° 55′ 15.47″	5.95	-3.14	2146	B7II-III	Be star
HD 150576	ξ (Note: Labelled Xi Arae (ξ Ara/ξ Arae) by Bode in his Uranographia)		150576	81966	16^{h} 44^{m} 39.75^{s}	−53° 09′ 08.2″	5.96	−0.66	688	G8III	
HD 153221			153221	83216	17^{h} 00^{m} 26.98^{s}	−48° 38′ 51.2″	5.98	0.60	389	G5IV	
HD 152082			152082	82806	16^{h} 55^{m} 24.68^{s}	−63° 16′ 10.7″	5.99	0.30	448	A0III	
HD 158476			158476	85788	17^{h} 31^{m} 49.10^{s}	−46° 02′ 12.4″	6.04	−2.91	2012	F8/G0Ib	suspected variable
HD 153791			153791	83481	17^{h} 03^{m} 41.68^{s}	−47° 09′ 38.1″	6.07	−0.33	620	A2/A3V	
HR 6384		V829	155341	84311	17^{h} 14^{m} 13.40^{s}	−56° 53′ 18.6″	6.08	−1.90	1283	M1/2II/III+A	semiregular variable, V_{max} = 6.02^{m}, V_{min} = 6.25^{m}, P = 50.58 d
HD 159018			159018	86064	17^{h} 35^{m} 19.91^{s}	−53° 21′ 10.4″	6.09	−1.50	1072	B9III	
HD 161420			161420	87174	17^{h} 48^{m} 38.08^{s}	−55° 24′ 06.6″	6.09	2.55	166	A9IV	
ν^{2} Ara	ν^{2}		161917	87379	17^{h} 51^{m} 11.03^{s}	−53° 07′ 49.0″	6.09	0.13	508	B9.5III/IV	
HD 162123	χ (Note: Labelled Chi Arae (χ Ara/χ Arae) by Bode in his Uranographia)		162123	87404	17^{h} 51^{m} 44.55^{s}	−45° 36′ 02.5″	6.09	−0.51	682	G6III	
HD 165493			165493	88859	18^{h} 08^{m} 30.11^{s}	−45° 46′ 01.1″	6.13	−0.86	815	B7/B8II	
HD 149485			149485	81507	16^{h} 38^{m} 52.71^{s}	−60° 59′ 25.1″	6.16	0.08	537	B8Vn	
HD 149837			149837	81657	16^{h} 40^{m} 50.41^{s}	−60° 26′ 46.6″	6.17	3.73	100	F2III-IV	
HD 157599	ω^{1} (Note: Labelled Omega^{1} Arae (ω^{1} Ara/ω^{1} Arae) by Bode in his Uranographia)		157599	85393	17^{h} 26^{m} 56.35^{s}	−51° 56′ 55.6″	6.17	0.26	495	B8/B9V	
HD 150421			150421	81847	16^{h} 43^{m} 03.57^{s}	−46° 04′ 13.0″	6.22			F5Iab	
HD 157524			157524	85480	17^{h} 28^{m} 07.88^{s}	−63° 02′ 10.3″	6.22	−0.68	782	B7/B8V	
V828 Ara		V828	153261	83323	17^{h} 01^{m} 47.39^{s}	−58° 57′ 29.6″	6.26	−2.96	2280	B2IVne	Be star, V_{max} = 6.11^{m}, V_{min} = 6.24^{m}
HD 158895			158895	86088	17^{h} 35^{m} 35.00^{s}	−59° 50′ 45.9″	6.26	−1.90	1399	B5II/III	
HD 163071			163071	87928	17^{h} 57^{m} 42.74^{s}	−56° 53′ 46.4″	6.26	−1.74	1299	B4III	
HD 156331			156331	84759	17^{h} 19^{m} 30.51^{s}	−50° 03′ 49.3″	6.27	2.54	182	F2III	
V626 Ara		V626	160342	86628	17^{h} 42^{m} 03.62^{s}	−50° 30′ 38.4″	6.28	−2.01	1482	M3III	slow irregular variable, V_{max} = 6.23^{m}, V_{min} = 6.46^{m}
V872 Ara		V872	149989	81650	16^{h} 40^{m} 44.39^{s}	−51° 28′ 42.9″	6.30	2.86	159	A9V	γ Dor variable
ρ^{1} Ara	ρ^{1}	V846	152478	82868	16^{h} 56^{m} 08.85^{s}	−50° 40′ 29.2″	6.30	−0.51	751	B3Vnpe	Be star
HD 158907			158907	85975	17^{h} 34^{m} 16.89^{s}	−48° 31′ 36.8″	6.32	0.52	470	G6/G8III	
HD 154555	υ (Note: Labelled Upsilon Arae (υ Ara/υ Arae) by Bode in his Uranographia)		154555	83984	17^{h} 10^{m} 06.28^{s}	−61° 40′ 31.6″	6.37	−1.87	1449	B8II/III	
HD 153201			153201	83269	17^{h} 01^{m} 07.03^{s}	−56° 33′ 18.1″	6.40	−1.40	1181	Ap...	
HD 153370	φ (Note: Labelled Phi Arae (φ Ara/φ Arae) by Bode in his Uranographia)		153370	83321	17^{h} 01^{m} 46.36^{s}	−51° 07′ 51.3″	6.43	1.45	323	A7V	
HD 151566			151566	82418	16^{h} 50^{m} 36.09^{s}	−50° 02′ 41.8″	6.45	2.07	245	A5+...	
HD 164896			164896	88675	18^{h} 06^{m} 09.21^{s}	−51° 44′ 38.0″	6.46	−1.89	1523	A2III	
HD 150897			150897	82091	16^{h} 46^{m} 06.38^{s}	−46° 31′ 54.9″	6.47	0.78	448	A1V	
HD 152220			152220	82723	16^{h} 54^{m} 31.55^{s}	−49° 42′ 38.8″	6.49	−1.68	1405	K1II	
HD 155951			155951	84700	17^{h} 18^{m} 51.78^{s}	−62° 52′ 28.3″	6.50	0.39	542	K1III	
HD 157832		V750	157832	85467	17^{h} 27^{m} 54.81^{s}	−47° 01′ 34.4″	6.65	-5.07	7200	B2Vne	γ Cas variable, V_{max} = 6.62^{m}, V_{min} = 6.68^{m}, P = 1.10406 d
HD 156411			156411	84787	17^{h} 19^{m} 51.40^{s}	−48° 32′ 57.5″	6.67	2.96	180	G1Vw...	Inquill, has a planet (b)
R Ara		R	149730	81589	16^{h} 39^{m} 44.74^{s}	−56° 59′ 39.8″	6.73	2.20	262	B9IV/V	Algol variable, V_{max} = 6.17^{m}, V_{min} = 7.32^{m}, P = 4.42522 d
HD 155555		V824	155555	84586	17^{h} 17^{m} 25.50^{s}	−66° 57′ 03.7″	6.77	4.18	102.5	G5IV+K0IV-V	RS CVn variable, ΔV = 0.07^{m}, P = 1.6816 d
HD 156385			156385	84757	17^{h} 19^{m} 29.90^{s}	−45° 38′ 23.9″	6.92			WC7.5	Wolf–Rayet star
HD 154857			154857	84069	17^{h} 11^{m} 15.72^{s}	−56° 40′ 50.9″	7.25	3.07	223	G5V	has 2 confirmed planets (b & c)
V535 Ara		V535	159441	86306	17^{h} 38^{m} 05.55^{s}	−56° 49′ 17.3″	7.36	2.02	381	A8V	W UMa variable, V_{max} = 7.17^{m}, V_{min} = 7.75^{m}, P = 0.62930098 d
HD 154672			154672	83983	17^{h} 10^{m} 04.91^{s}	−56° 26′ 57.4″	8.21	4.12	215	G3IV	has a planet (b)
RW Ara		RW	158830		17^{h} 34^{m} 49.23^{s}	−57° 08′ 50.5″	8.97			A1IV	Algol variable, V_{max} = 8.85^{m}, V_{min} = 11.45^{m}, P = 4.3674535 d
HD 152079			152079	82632	16^{h} 53^{m} 29.74^{s}	−46° 19′ 58.6″	9.20	4.55	278	G6V	has a planet (b)
Gliese 674				85523	17^{h} 28^{m} 39.95^{s}	−46° 53′ 42.7″	9.36	11.08	15	M2.5	has a planet (b)
Gliese 676A				85647	17^{h} 30^{m} 11.20^{s}	−51° 38′ 13.1″	9.59	8.55	53	M0	component of Gliese 676 system; has a planet (b)
S Ara		S		88064	17^{h} 59^{m} 10.75^{s}	−49° 26′ 00.5″	10.73	1.81	1980	A3	RR Lyr variable, V_{max} = 9.92^{m}, V_{min} = 11.24^{m}, P = 0.451848 d
SAO 244567		V839			17^{h} 16^{m} 21.08^{s}	−59° 29′ 23.3″	10.75	-2.96	18000	B3e	central star of Stingray Nebula
AE Ara		AE			17^{h} 41^{m} 04.91^{s}	−47° 03′ 27.0″	11.00			M2-5.5+Be	Z And variable, V_{max} = 11.0^{m}, V_{min} = 13.6^{m}, P = 803.4 d
CPD -56 8032		V837		83916	17^{h} 09^{m} 00.86^{s}	−56° 54′ 48.1″	11.04			WC10	central star of planetary nebula; Wolf–Rayet star V_{max} = 10.9^{m}, V_{min} = 12.4^{m}
AT Ara		AT			17^{h} 30^{m} 33.80^{s}	−46° 05′ 58.9″	11.5			K2+	SS Cyg variable, V_{max} = 11.5^{m}, V_{min} = 15.32^{m}, P = 0.37555 d
GX 339-4		V821			17^{h} 02^{m} 49.36^{s}	−48° 47′ 22.8″	15.5				X-ray nova, V_{max} = 15.4^{m}, V_{min} = 20.4^{m}, P = 1.7557 d
BPM 25114		V820			17^{h} 47^{m} 46.9^{s}	−52° 07′ 10″	15.62			DA:	variable white dwarf, V_{max} = 15.57^{m}, V_{min} = 15.74^{m}, P = 2.8391 d
Westerlund 1-26					16^{h} 47^{m} 05.40^{s}	−45° 50′ 36.8″	16.79			M5-6Ia	in Westerlund 1; one of the largest known stars
4U 1636-53		V801			16^{h} 40^{m} 55.5^{s}	−53° 45′ 05″	17.5			A1IV	X-ray burster, V_{max} = 16.5^{m}, V_{min} = 19.5^{m}, P = 0.15804693 d
SGR 1627-41					16^{h} 35^{m} 52.0^{s}	−47° 35′ 14.0″			11000		soft gamma repeater
Gliese 676B					17^{h} 30^{m} 11.2^{s}	−51° 38′ 13.1″				M3	component of Gliese 676 system
BF Ara		BF			17^{h} 38^{m} 21.33^{s}	−47° 10′ 41.5″					SU UMa variable
OY Ara		OY	149990		16^{h} 40^{m} 50.27^{s}	−52° 25′ 51.3″					nova and Algol variable
CXOU J164710.2-455216					16^{h} 47^{m} 10.20^{s}	−45° 52′ 16.8″					in Westerlund 1 Anomalous X-ray pulsar
PSR J1644-4559					16^{h} 44^{m} 49.28^{s}	−45° 59′ 09.5″					pulsar
XTE J1650-500					16^{h} 50^{m} 00.98^{s}	−49° 57′ 43.6″				K4V	Low-mass X-ray binary; black hole candidate
XTE J1701-462					17^{h} 00^{m} 58.46^{s}	−46° 11′ 08.6″					Low-mass X-ray binary
Table legend: • Name = Proper name • B = Bayer designation • F or/and G. = Flamsteed designation or Gould designation • Var = Variable star designation • HD = Henry Draper Catalogue designation number • HIP = Hipparcos Catalogue designation number • RA = Right ascension for the Epoch/Equinox J2000.0 • Dec = Declination for the Epoch/Equinox J2000.0 • vis. mag. = visual magnitude (m or m_{v}), also known as apparent magnitude • abs. mag. = absolute magnitude (M_{v}) • Dist. (ly) = Distance in light-years from Earth • Sp. class = Spectral class of the star in the stellar classification system • Notes = Common name(s) or alternate name(s); comments; notable properties [for example: multiple star status, range of variability if it is a variable star, exoplanets, etc.]

== See also ==
- List of stars by constellation
