= Rho Arae =

The Bayer designation Rho Arae (ρ Ara / ρ Arae) is shared by two star systems, in the constellation Ara:

- ρ¹ Arae
- ρ² Arae

It is not to be confused with the variable star R Arae.
