= Nu Arae =

Nu Arae (ν Arae / ν Ara) is shared by two star systems in the constellation Ara:

- ν^{1} Arae
- ν^{2} Arae

They are separated by 0.49° on the heavens. The stars are also sometimes referred to Upsilon Arae (υ^{1} and υ^{2} Arae), but more generally unlettered.
