= HD 154857 c =

Extrasolar planet in the constellation Ara

Discovery
- Discovered by: O’Toole
- Discovery site: Australia
- Discovery date: 9 February 2007
- Detection method: Doppler spectroscopy

Orbital characteristics
- Semi-major axis: 5.36 AU (802,000,000 km)
- Eccentricity: 0.06
- Orbital period (sidereal): 3470 d 9.5 y
- Semi-amplitude: >23
- Star: HD 154857

HD 154857 c is an extrasolar planet located approximately 224 light-years away in the constellation of Ara, orbiting the star HD 154857. This planet takes about 3470 days (9.5 years) to orbit the star.

The first signs of this planet were noticed on 9 February 2007 by O’Toole in Australia using the method Doppler spectroscopy, along with HD 23127 b and HD 159868 b. The orbit had not yet been completely observed, so the values quoted were lower limits. The previously unconstrained orbital period and minimum mass were constrained in January 2014.

== See also ==
- HD 154857 b
