= NGC 6193 =

Open star cluster in the constellation Ara

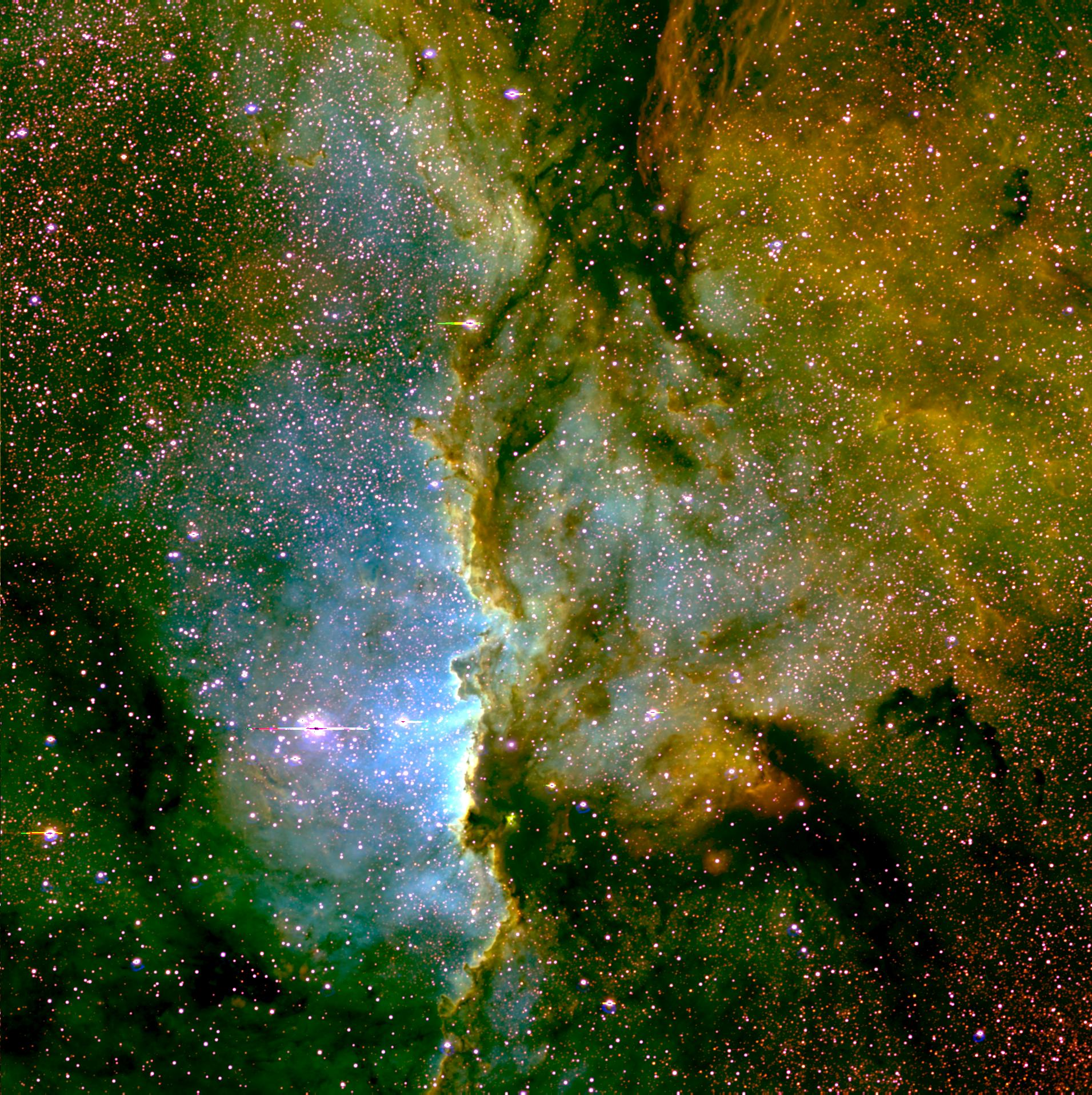
- NGC 6193 and the nebula NGC 6188

Observation data (J2000 epoch)
- Right ascension: 16^{h} 41^{m} 20^{s}
- Declination: −48° 45′ 48″
- Distance: 3765.3 ly (1155 pc)
- Apparent magnitude (V): 5.2
- Apparent dimensions (V): 15′

Physical characteristics
- Estimated age: 3 million years
- Other designations: C 1637-486, Cl VDBH 195, OCl 975, Dun 413, Cr 310, ESO 226-SC020, Lund 716, h 3642, GC 4225, Caldwell 82

Associations
- Constellation: Ara

NGC 6193 (also known as Caldwell 82 or the Firebird Cluster) is open cluster containing 27 stars in the constellation Ara, visible to the unaided eye. NGC 6193 lies at the center of the Ara OB1 association, which extends over a square degree. The cluster is associated with (and provides the energizing radiation for) neighboring regions of the nebulosity NGC 6188.

== Cluster members ==
NGC 6193 is dominated by two O class multiple star systems within 10" of each other at the centre of the cluster, and a probable binary B0 giant. There are at least 20 other early B stars in the cluster, of 9th and 10th magnitude.

#	Name	Right ascension	Declination	m_{V}	Spectral type	Comment
56	HD 150136	16^{h} 41^{m} 20.4149^{s}	−48° 45′ 46.644″	5.62	O3−3.5 V + O5.5−6 V + O6.5−7 V	Triple system
55	HD 150135	16^{h} 41^{m} 19.4537^{s}	−48° 45′ 47.585″	6.89	O6.5V((f))z	Binary
45	HD 150041	16^{h} 40^{m} 44.5820^{s}	−48° 45′ 22.214″	7.06	B0III	Variable
37	HD 149834	16^{h} 39^{m} 30.6704^{s}	−48° 51′ 02.511″	9.17	B2V	Binary?
59	CD-48 11080	16^{h} 41^{m} 36.3084^{s}	−48° 47′ 14.904″	10.32	B4V	
	CD-48 11077	16^{h} 41^{m} 34.91^{s}	−48° 46′ 24.2″	10.42	B2.5V	
58	CD-48 11075	16^{h} 41^{m} 33.21^{s}	−48° 45′ 06.6″	10.05	B2.5V	
54	CD-48 11071	16^{h} 41^{m} 25.8569^{s}	−48° 45′ 14.265″	8.45	B1V	Binary
53	CD-48 11069	16^{h} 41^{m} 22.10^{s}	−48° 44′ 57″	9.55	B1V	
40	CD-48 11039	16^{h} 40^{m} 00.752^{s}	−48° 47′ 02.41″	11.02	B3V	
42	CD-48 11046	16^{h} 40^{m} 20.94^{s}	−48° 54′ 56.2″	10.91	B2.5V	
43	CD-48 11051	16^{h} 40^{m} 33.8837^{s}	−48° 53′ 16.19″	10.39	B1h	
	CD-48 11060	16^{h} 40^{m} 43^{s}	−48° 48.8′	10.71	B3V	
47	CD-48 11061	16^{h} 40^{m} 53.26^{s}	−48° 45′ 35.2″	11.21	B3.5V	binary
50	CD-48 11062	16^{h} 41^{m} 02.49^{s}	−48° 53′ 49.7″	11.42	B3.5V	
52	CD-48 11065	16^{h} 41^{m} 08.48^{s}	−48° 52′ 21.6″	11.06	B2.5V	Wrongly cross-referenced to HD 150136 in Herbst
57	CD-48 11076	16^{h} 41^{m} 33.0589^{s}	−48° 33′ 59.651″	10.10	B2V	
63	CD-48 11082	16^{h} 41^{m} 6.3148^{s}	−48° 47′ 41.527″	10.38	B2V	
65	CD-48 11086	16^{h} 41^{m} 54.83^{s}	−48° 45′ 22.8″	10.38	B2.5V	
66	CD-48 11088	16^{h} 42^{m} 00.47^{s}	−48° 42′ 32.5″	10.05	B2.5V	
67	CD-48 11090	16^{h} 42^{m} 05.69^{s}	−48° 42′ 56.8″	10.59	B2.5V	

== Image gallery ==
Star cluster NGC 6193 and nebula NGC 6188.

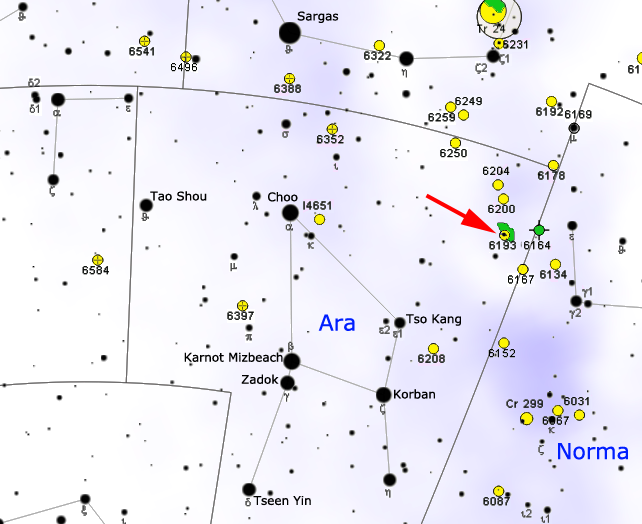
Map showing the location of NGC 6193.
