= NGC 6188 =

Emission nebula in the constellation Ara

Emission nebula
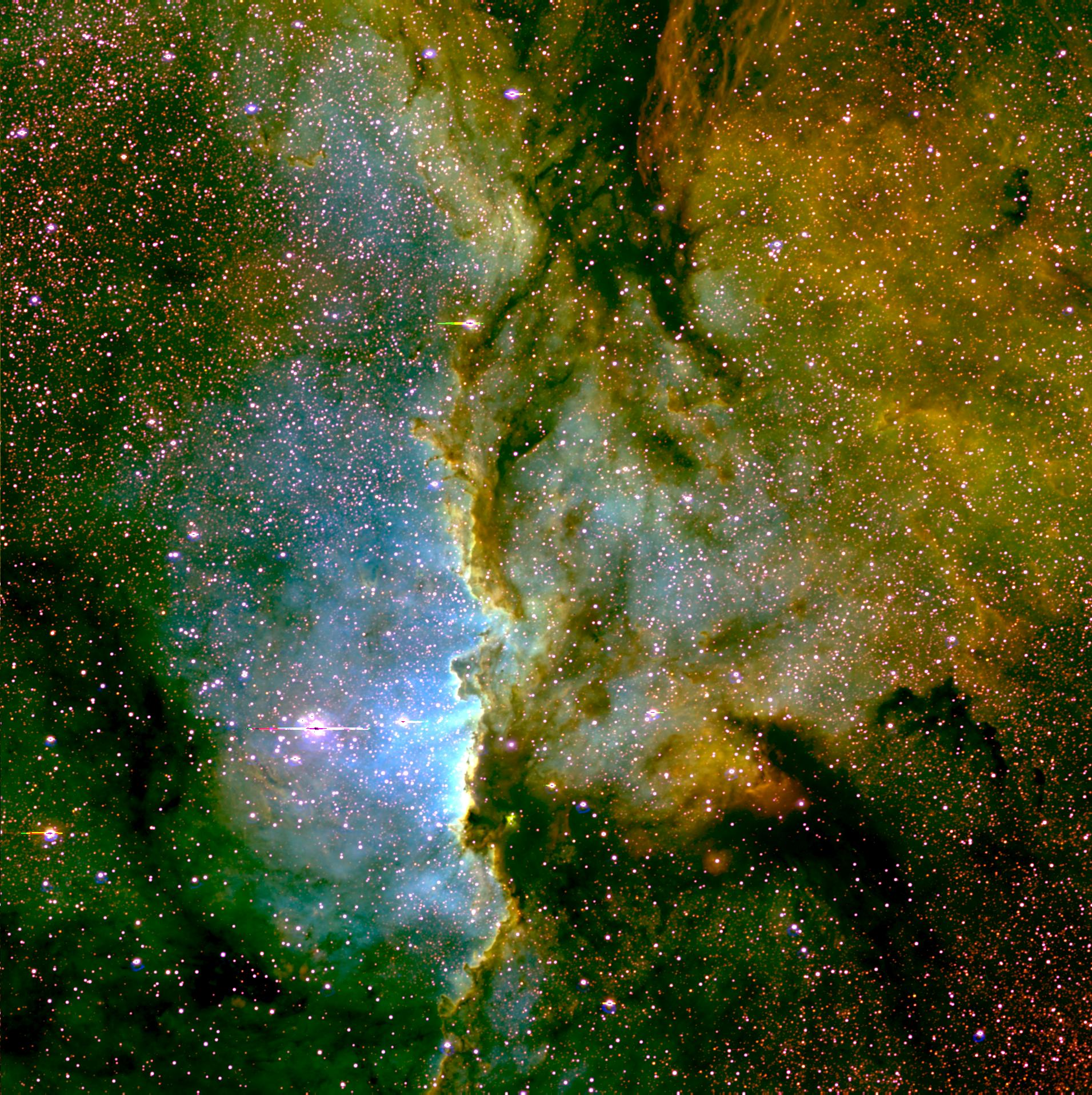
- NGC 6188 and the associated star cluster NGC 6193

Observation data: J2000.0 epoch
- Right ascension: 16^{h} 40^{m} 05^{s}
- Declination: −48° 47′
- Distance: 4,000 ly
- Apparent dimensions (V): 20 x 12 arcmins
- Constellation: Ara

Physical characteristics
- Radius: 300 ly

NGC 6188, also known as the Firebird Nebula, is an emission nebula located about 4,000 light years away in the constellation Ara. The bright open cluster NGC 6193, visible to the naked eye, is responsible for a region of reflection nebulosity within NGC 6188.

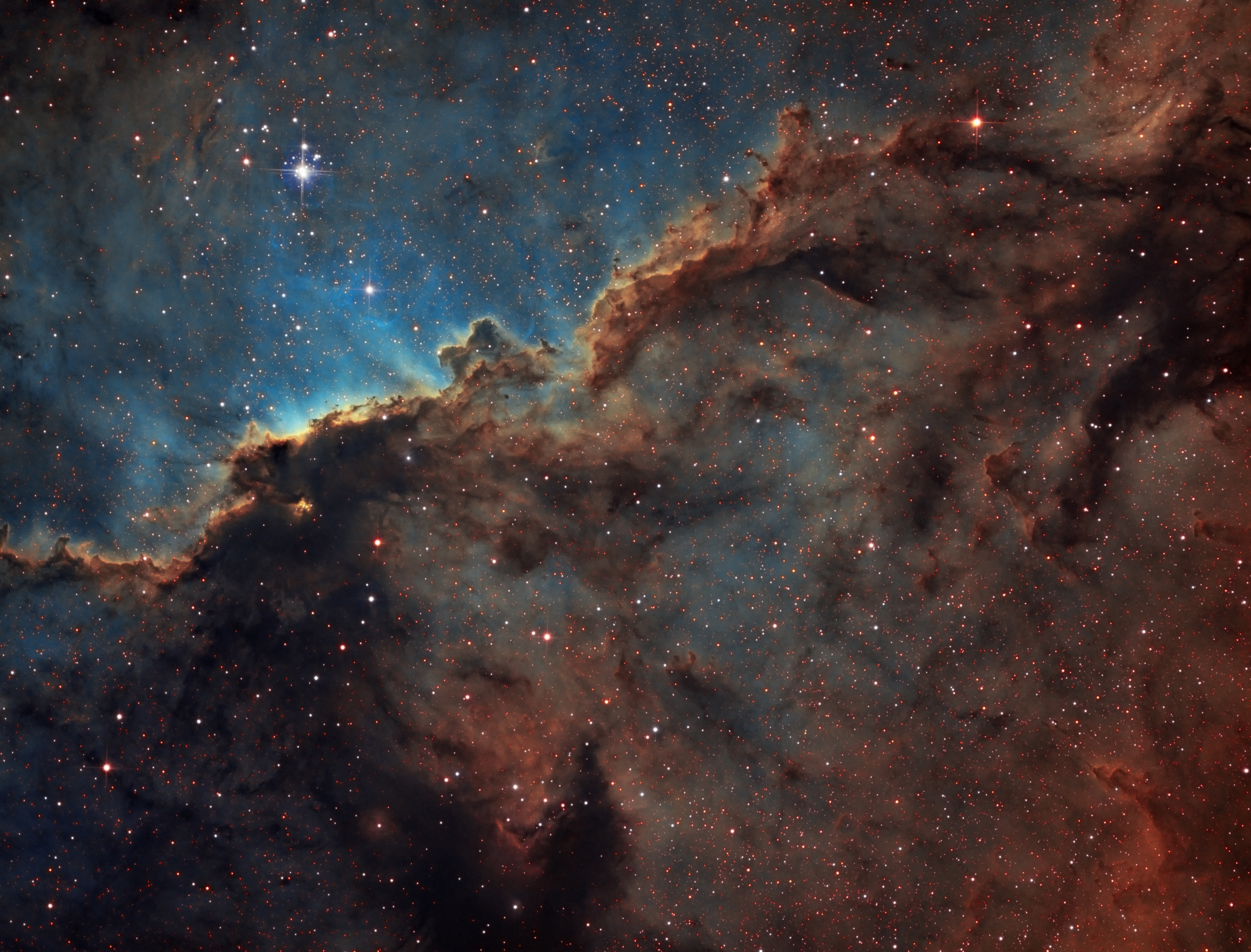
Astrophotography of the NGC6188 nebula in narrowband technique and Hubble palette (SHO).

NGC 6188 is a star forming nebula, and is sculpted by the massive, young stars that have recently formed there – some are only a few million years old. This spark of formation was probably caused when the last batch of stars went supernova.
