= HD 158476 =

F-type supergiant star in the constellation Ara

- Location of HD 158476 (circled)

Observation data Epoch J2000 Equinox ICRS
- Constellation: Ara
- Right ascension: 17^{h} 31^{m} 49.09850^{s}
- Declination: −46° 02′ 12.4311″
- Apparent magnitude (V): 6.048

Characteristics
- Spectral type: F8/G0Ib
- B−V color index: +0.83

Astrometry
Radial velocity (R_{v})	−29.0 km/s
Proper motion (μ)	RA: +1.810 mas/yr Dec.: −3.806 mas/yr
Parallax (π)	1.7610±0.0460 mas
Distance	1,850 ± 50 ly (570 ± 10 pc)
Absolute magnitude (M_{V})	−2.13

Details
Mass	5.8 M_{☉}
Radius	38 R_{☉}
Luminosity	1,142 L_{☉}
Surface gravity (log g)	1.89 cgs
Temperature	5,305 K
Rotational velocity (v sin i)	9.5 km/s

Other designations
- CD−45°11626, HD 158476, HIP 85788, HR 6513, SAO 228075

Database references
SIMBAD	data

HD 158476 is a supergiant star in the southern constellation of Ara. There is a faint magnitude 10.5 companion at an angular separation of 20.0″ along a position angle of 209° (as of 2013).
