= HD 153370 =

Star in the constellation Ara

Observation data Epoch J2000 Equinox ICRS
- Constellation: Ara
- Right ascension: 17^{h} 01^{m} 46.35181^{s}
- Declination: −51° 07′ 51.7016″
- Apparent magnitude (V): 6.45 (7.23 + 7.27)

Characteristics
- Spectral type: A7V
- B−V color index: +0.27

Astrometry
Radial velocity (R_{v})	−27.90±1.78 km/s
Proper motion (μ)	RA: −10.62 mas/yr Dec.: −45.64 mas/yr
Parallax (π)	9.57±0.86 mas
Distance	340 ± 30 ly (104 ± 9 pc)
Absolute magnitude (M_{V})	+1.36

Orbit
Period (P)	62.29 yr
Semi-major axis (a)	0.2550″
Eccentricity (e)	0.67

Details

A
Mass	2.3 M_{☉}

B
Mass	2.1 M_{☉}

Other designations
- CD−50°10955, HD 153370, HIP 83321, HR 6312, SAO 244370

Database references
SIMBAD	data

HD 153370 is binary star in the southern constellation of Ara.
