= HD 153221 =

Double star in the constellation Ara

Observation data Epoch J2000 Equinox J2000
- Constellation: Ara
- Right ascension: 17^{h} 00^{m} 26.95941^{s}
- Declination: −48° 38′ 51.9319″
- Apparent magnitude (V): 6.00 (6.34 + 7.69)

Characteristics
- Spectral type: G8/K0 III + G
- B−V color index: +0.88

Astrometry
Radial velocity (R_{v})	−28.6 km/s
Proper motion (μ)	RA: −17.93 mas/yr Dec.: −80.49 mas/yr
Parallax (π)	9.36±0.75 mas
Distance	350 ± 30 ly (107 ± 9 pc)
Absolute magnitude (M_{V})	+0.85

Details
Luminosity	49.5 L_{☉}
Temperature	4,993 K
Rotational velocity (v sin i)	4.4 km/s

Other designations
- CD−48°11360, HD 153221, HIP 83216, HR 6300, SAO 227542

Database references
SIMBAD	data

HD 153221 is a double star in the southern constellation of Ara. As of 2012, the pair have an angular separation of 1.10″ along a position angle of 172°.
