= Kappa Arae =

Star in the constellation Ara

- The location of κ Arae (circled)

Observation data Epoch J2000 Equinox ICRS
- Constellation: Ara
- Right ascension: 17^{h} 26^{m} 00.043^{s}
- Declination: −50° 38′ 00.62″
- Apparent magnitude (V): 5.200±0.009

Characteristics
- Evolutionary stage: Giant
- Spectral type: G8 III
- B−V color index: +1.03±0.01

Astrometry
Radial velocity (R_{v})	+17.8±0.1 km/s
Proper motion (μ)	RA: +13.004 mas/yr Dec.: +7.554 mas/yr
Parallax (π)	7.5862±0.0741 mas
Distance	430 ± 4 ly (132 ± 1 pc)
Absolute magnitude (M_{V})	−0.49±0.06

Details
Mass	3.23±0.24 M_{☉}
Radius	18.22±0.60 R_{☉}
Luminosity	166.1±8.9 L_{☉}
Surface gravity (log g)	2.56±0.15 cgs
Temperature	4,855±48 K
Metallicity [Fe/H]	−0.058±0.037 dex
Rotational velocity (v sin i)	1.0 km/s

Other designations
- κ Ara, κ Arae, CD−50°11269, GC 23552, HD 157457, HIP 85312, HR 6468, SAO 244734, PPM 244734, WDS J17260-5038A, TIC 214455108

Database references
SIMBAD	data

Kappa Arae is a single star in the southern constellation of Ara. Its name is a Bayer designation that is Latinized from κ Arae, and abbreviated Kappa Ara or κ Ara. With an apparent visual magnitude of 5.20, this star is faintly visible to the naked eye. Based upon parallax measurements, it is approximately 430 light-years (130 parsecs) distant from Earth, give or take a 4 light-year margin of error. It is receding from the Sun with a radial velocity of +17.8 km/s.

This is a giant star with a stellar classification of G8 III, having exhausted the hydrogen at its core and evolved away from the main sequence. With 3.2 times the mass of the Sun, its outer envelope has expanded to about 18 times the Sun's radius. It is radiating 166 times the luminosity of the Sun from its photosphere at an effective temperature of 4,855 K. This is hot enough for it to shine with the golden-hued glow of a G-type star. It is a source for coronal X-ray emission and has been reported as a mild barium star, although the latter is questionable.

Kappa Arae has two 14th magnitude optical companions that are at an angular distance of 25 and 30 arcseconds.
