= HD 150136 =

Multiple star system in the constellation Ara

- Location of HD 150136 (circled)

Observation data Epoch J2000 Equinox ICRS
- Constellation: Ara
- Right ascension: 16^{h} 41^{m} 20.41559^{s}
- Declination: −48° 45′ 46.7305″
- Apparent magnitude (V): 5.54

Characteristics
- Spectral type: O3 V((f*)) - O3.5 V((f+)) + O5.5-6 V((f)) + O6.5-7 V((f))
- U−B color index: −0.76
- B−V color index: +0.20

Astrometry
Radial velocity (R_{v})	−27 km/s
Proper motion (μ)	RA: +2.514 mas/yr Dec.: −4.309 mas/yr
Parallax (π)	0.6934±0.0484 mas
Distance	4,310 ± 390 ly (1,320 ± 120 pc) ly
Absolute magnitude (M_{V})	−6.47 (−5.91 + −4.90 + −4.44)

Orbit
Primary	Primary
Name	Secondary
Period (P)	2.67454 days
Semi-major axis (a)	38.2 R_{☉}
Eccentricity (e)	0
Inclination (i)	53°
Semi-amplitude (K_{1}) (primary)	208.3 km/s
Semi-amplitude (K_{2}) (secondary)	334.5 km/s

Orbit
Primary	Primary/Secondary
Name	Tertiary
Period (P)	3069 d
Semi-major axis (a)	16.918" (20.9 AU)
Eccentricity (e)	0.6780
Inclination (i)	106.11°
Semi-amplitude (K_{1}) (primary)	22.1 km/s
Semi-amplitude (K_{2}) (secondary)	70.6 km/s

Details

Primary
Mass	54 M_{☉}
Radius	12.13 R_{☉}
Luminosity	724,000 L_{☉}
Surface gravity (log g)	4.00 cgs
Temperature	46,500 K
Rotational velocity (v sin i)	171 km/s

Secondary
Mass	34 M_{☉}
Radius	9.54 R_{☉}
Luminosity	209,000 L_{☉}
Surface gravity (log g)	4.00 cgs
Temperature	40,000 K
Rotational velocity (v sin i)	136 km/s
Age	0-2 Myr

Tertiary
Mass	27.1 M_{☉}
Radius	8.24 R_{☉}
Luminosity	102,000 L_{☉}
Surface gravity (log g)	3.50 cgs
Temperature	36,000 K
Rotational velocity (v sin i)	72 km/s
Age	1-3 Myr

Other designations
- HD 150136, CD−48°11070, HIP 81702, HR 6187, SAO 227049, WDS J16413-4846

Database references
SIMBAD	data

HD 150136 is a multiple star system in the southern constellation of Ara, around 4,300 light years away. It is the brightest member of the faint open cluster NGC 6193, part of the Ara OB1 association.

== System ==
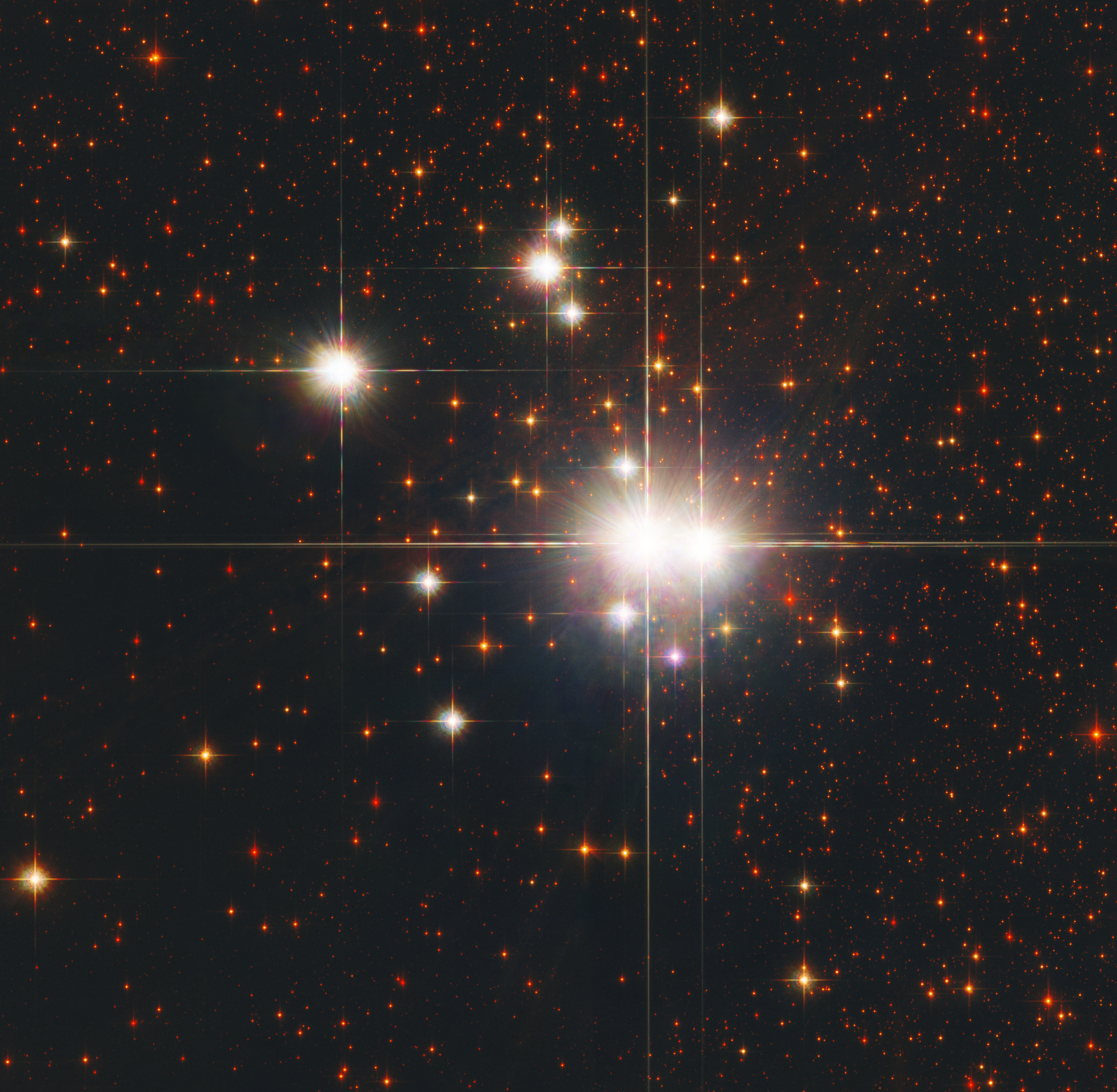
Closeup of the NGC 6193 cluster, resolving HD 150136 and HD 150135

HD 150136 is listed in the Washington Double Star Catalog as having seven visual components within 30 arcseconds. Component A is a close triple system containing three massive class O main sequence stars. The brightest companion is catalogued individually as HD 150135 as well as component C of the multiple system, separated by only 10 arcseconds. It is another O class spectroscopic binary and also a member of NGC 6193. The other catalogued components are all 10th to 12th magnitude, similar to many other stars known to be members of NGC 6193.

The primary star consists of a double-lined spectroscopic binary with a more distant tertiary companion. The third star is orbiting the other two with a period of 8.2 years, an eccentricity of 0.73, and an inclination of 108°. The close binary stars are separated by hardly more than their own diameters and orbit in less than 3 days, but the third is separated enough to have been resolved visually by VLTI. The measured separation in 2012 was 9 milli-arcseconds, corresponding to 11-12 AU.

== Properties ==
All three (four, including HD 150135) of the brightest stars are massive luminous O class main sequence stars, 27 to 54 times as massive as the Sun. They are around 10 times the size of the Sun, but 6-8 times hotter and each is over 100,000 times as luminous. The primary star is the closest O3 star to Earth, 46,500 K, visually 18,000 times as bright as the sun, but because of its high temperature it is around three quarters of a million times more luminous including all wavelengths.

== See also ==
- List of most massive stars
