= HD 151967 =

Star in the constellation Ara

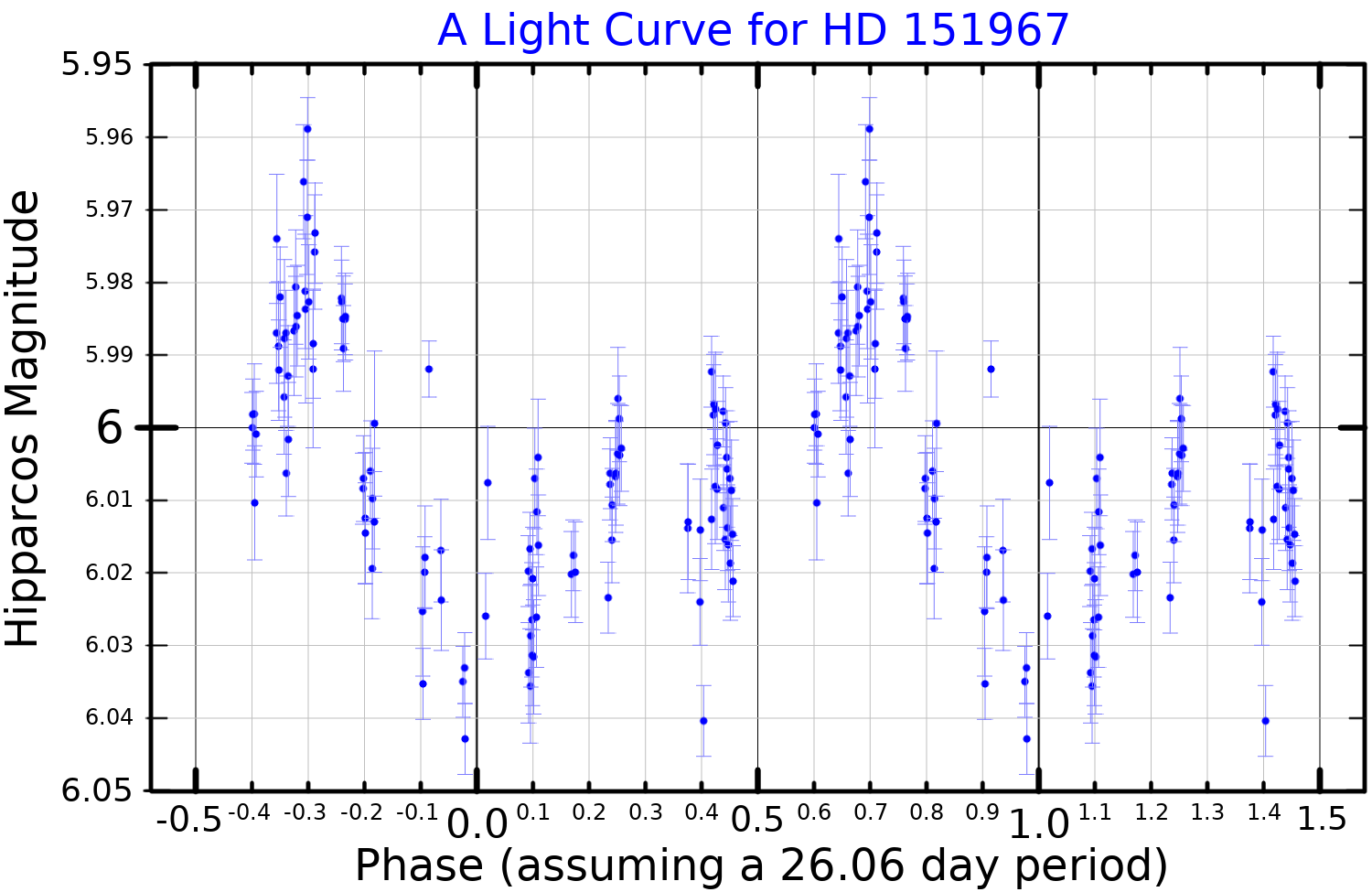
- A light curve for HD 151967, plotted from Hipparcos data.

Observation data Epoch J2000 Equinox ICRS
- Constellation: Ara
- Right ascension: 16^{h} 54^{m} 00.36029^{s}
- Declination: −57° 54′ 34.2317″
- Apparent magnitude (V): 5.92

Characteristics
- Evolutionary stage: AGB
- Spectral type: M1III
- U−B color index: +1.92
- B−V color index: +1.60
- Variable type: Suspected

Astrometry
Radial velocity (R_{v})	−40.7 km/s
Proper motion (μ)	RA: −40.18 mas/yr Dec.: −123.26 mas/yr
Parallax (π)	4.60±0.47 mas
Distance	approx. 710 ly (approx. 220 pc)
Absolute magnitude (M_{V})	−0.75

Details
Mass	1.4 M_{☉}
Radius	45 R_{☉}
Luminosity	419 L_{☉}
Temperature	3,886 K

Other designations
- CPD−57°8157, HD 151967, HR 6251, HIP 82672, SAO 244245

Database references
SIMBAD	data

HD 151967 is suspected variable star in the southern constellation of Ara. It is a sixth magnitude star, which means it is just visible to the naked eye in dark skies. Parallax measurements place it at a distance of approximately 710 light years from the Earth.

This is a red giant with a stellar classification of M1III; it has expanded to 53 times the radius of the Sun and radiates 637 times the Sun's luminosity. The star varies in brightness by an amplitude of 0.0156 in magnitude over a period of 26 days. The effective temperature of the outer atmosphere is 3,839 K, giving it the ruddy hue of an M-type star.
