= HD 158220 =

Star in the constellation Ara

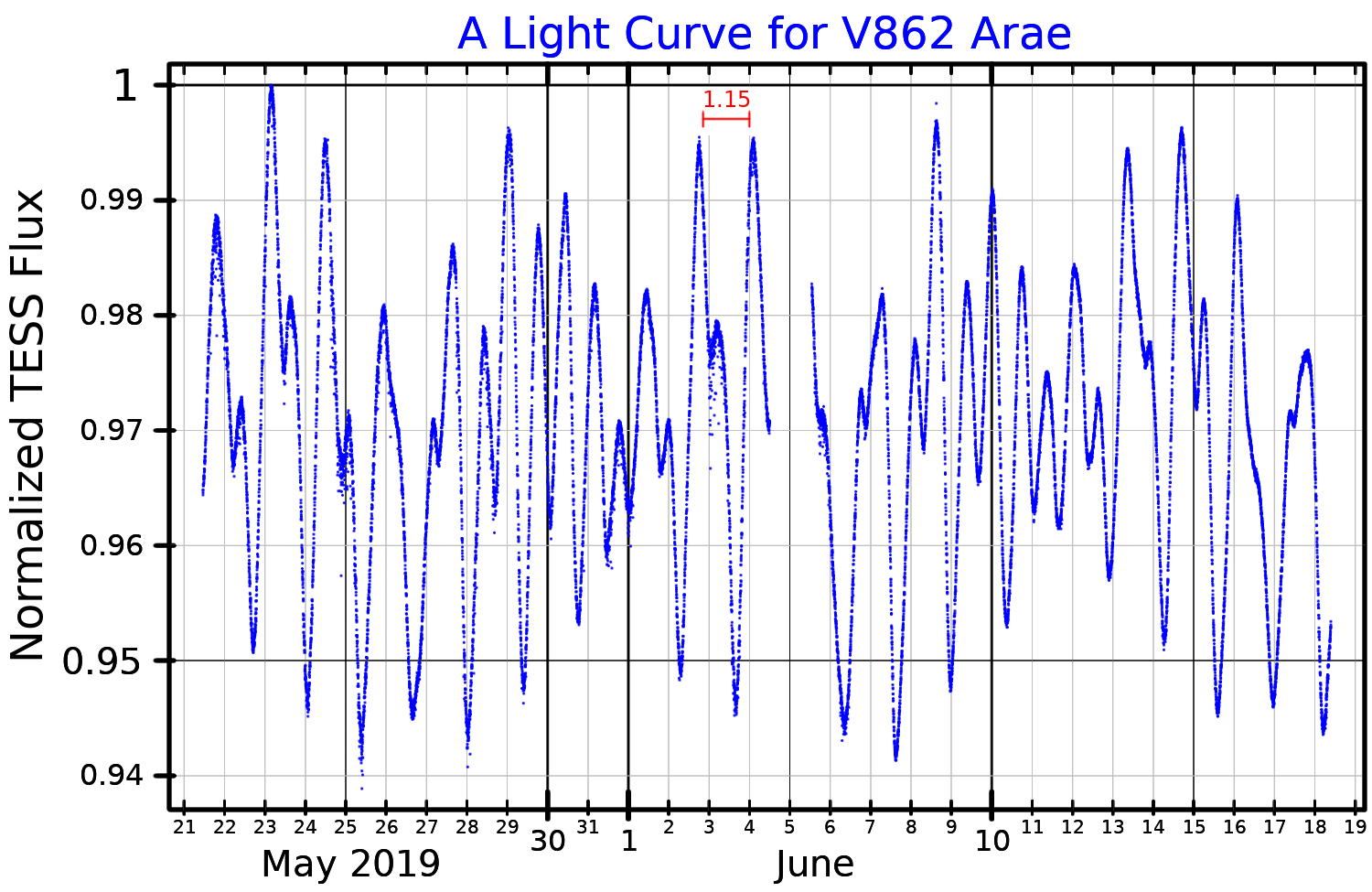
- A light curve for V862 Arae, plotted from TESS data. The 1.15 day period is marked in red.

Observation data Epoch J2000 Equinox ICRS
- Constellation: Ara
- Right ascension: 17^{h} 31^{m} 23.28387^{s}
- Declination: −56° 55′ 15.4672″
- Apparent magnitude (V): 5.95

Characteristics
- Spectral type: B7II-III
- B−V color index: −0.08
- Variable type: Be star

Astrometry
Radial velocity (R_{v})	−3 km/s
Proper motion (μ)	RA: −0.29 mas/yr Dec.: −3.72 mas/yr
Parallax (π)	1.78±0.34 mas
Distance	approx. 1,800 ly (approx. 600 pc)

Details
Luminosity	1,176 L_{☉}
Temperature	9,657 K

Other designations
- V862 Arae, CD−56°6893, HD 158220, HIP 85751, HR 6505, SAO 244808.

Database references
SIMBAD	data

HD 158220 is a giant Be star in the southern constellation of Ara. Its apparent magnitude is 5.9, making it faintly visible to the naked eye under good observing conditions. This is a pulsating variable star that changes brightness by an amplitude of 0.030 magnitude over a period of 1.15 days.

The Hipparcos data revealed that HD 158220 is a variable star. It was given its variable star designation, V862 Arae, in 1999.
