= HD 152082 =

Star in the constellation Ara

Observation data Epoch J2000 Equinox ICRS
- Constellation: Ara
- Right ascension: 16^{h} 55^{m} 24.68960^{s}
- Declination: −63° 16′ 10.7758″
- Apparent magnitude (V): 6.02

Characteristics
- Spectral type: A0III
- B−V color index: 0.05

Astrometry
Radial velocity (R_{v})	−8.60 km/s
Proper motion (μ)	RA: 8.57 mas/yr Dec.: -14.09 mas/yr
Parallax (π)	6.94±0.39 mas
Distance	470 ± 30 ly (144 ± 8 pc)
Absolute magnitude (M_{V})	+0.21

Details
Mass	2.2 M_{☉}
Radius	4.5 R_{☉}
Luminosity	112 L_{☉}
Surface gravity (log g)	3.48 cgs
Temperature	8,840 K
Rotation	27.15 days
Age	352 Myr

Other designations
- CD−63°1237, HD 152082, HIP 82806, HR 6253, SAO 253734

Database references
SIMBAD	data

HD 152082 is an A-type shell star in the southern constellation of Ara. It is a giant star that has expanded away from the main sequence and is now 4.5 times larger than the Sun and 112 times as luminous.

HD 152082 has a thirteenth magnitude companion at an angular separation of 6.8″ along a position angle of 329° (as of 2000), but it has a much smaller parallax than the brighter star and is much further away.
