= Stingray Nebula =

Planetary nebula in the constellation Ara

Emission nebula
- Planetary nebula
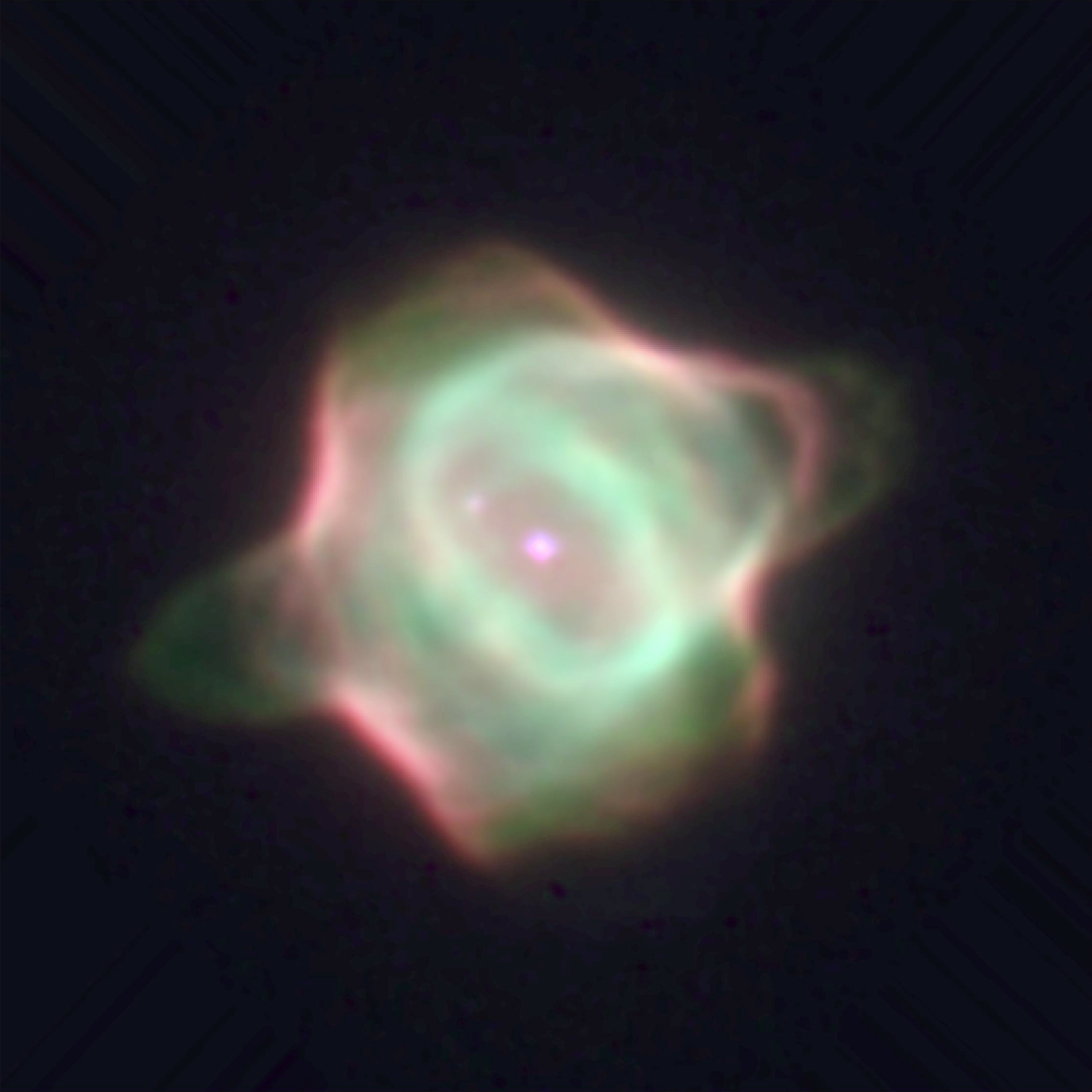
- Hubble Space Telescope photograph (Credit: M. Bobrowsky and NASA)

Observation data: J2000 epoch
- Right ascension: 17^{h} 16^{m} 21.071^{s}
- Declination: −59° 29′ 23.64″
- Distance: 18,000 ly (5,600 pc)
- Apparent magnitude (V): 10.75
- Apparent dimensions (V): 1″.6
- Constellation: Ara

Physical characteristics
- Radius: 0.08 ly
- Designations: PN G331.3-12.1, Hen 3-1357

The Stingray Nebula (Hen 3-1357) is the youngest-known planetary nebula, having appeared in the 1980s. The nebula is located in the direction of the southern constellation Ara (the Altar), and is located 18,000 light-years (5,600 parsecs) away. Although it is some 130 times the size of the Solar System (as measured from the semi-major axis of Pluto at 39.482 AU), the Stingray Nebula is only about one tenth the size of most other known planetary nebulae. The central star of the nebula is the fast-evolving star SAO 244567. Until the early 1970s, it was observed on Earth as a preplanetary nebula in which the gas had not yet become hot and ionized.

The image of the nebula shows how the older outer shells of gas are acting as a collimator for the more recent gas outflow from the central star—an important observation, as this process has not been well understood.

== History ==
Prior to the discovery of the nebula, its central star was known as He 3-1357, which Karl Gordon Henize classified as an A- or B-type Hα emission-line star in 1976. It was observed in 1971 to be post-asymptotic giant branch B1 or B2 supergiant. Planetary nebula emission lines were identified in this star in 1989 by the International Ultraviolet Explorer. As the nebula would be newly formed and very small, ground-based observations were not able to resolve it; so Matt Bobrowsky observed it with the Hubble Space Telescope, discovering the nebula, which he named the "Stingray Nebula".

In 1993, M. Parthasarathy et al. looked at the history of measurements of the brightness of the central star, and concluded that it was fading in the optical region of the spectrum. It was given its variable star designation, V839 Arae, in 1997.

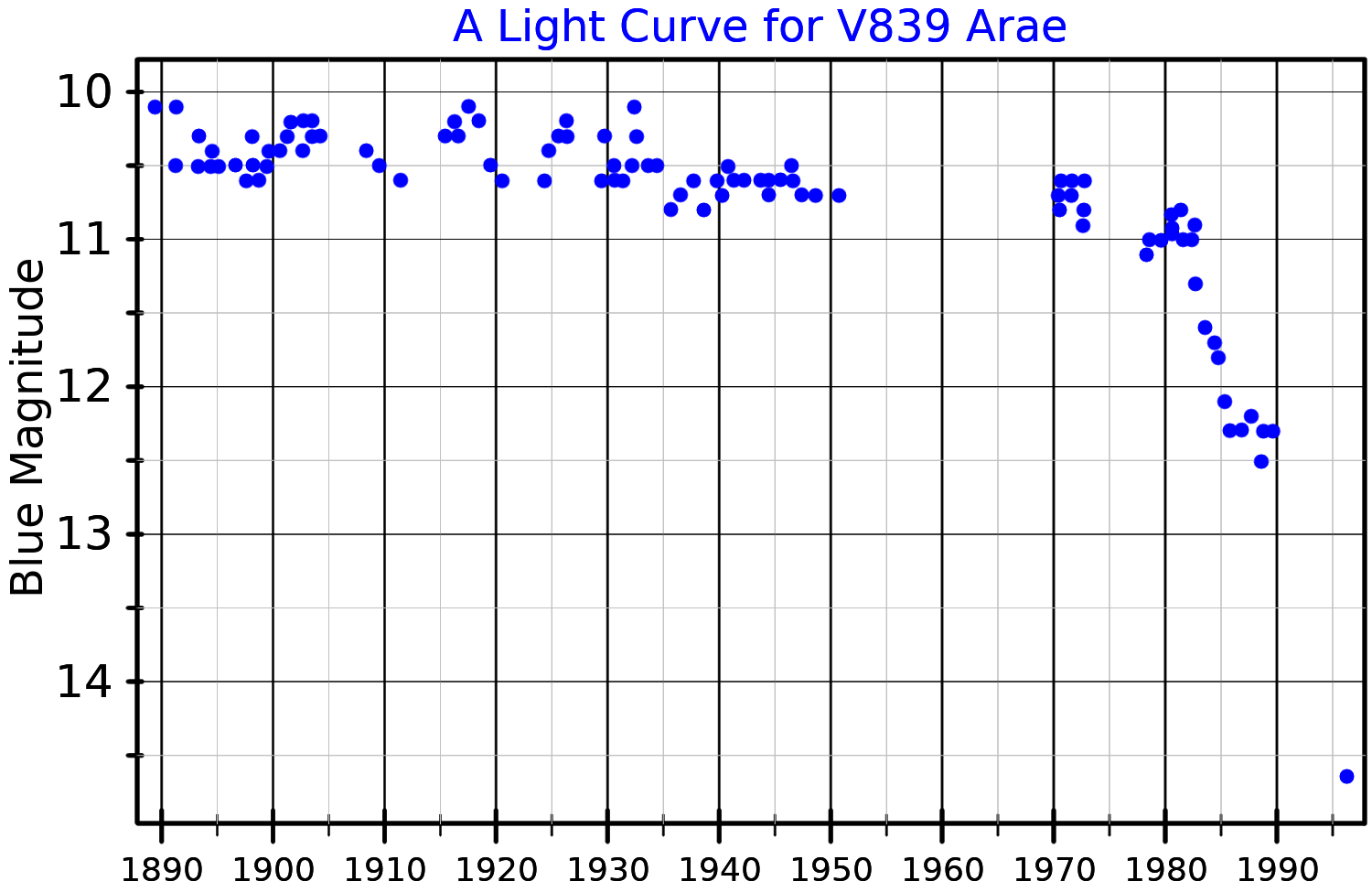
A blue band light curve for V839 Arae (the central star of the Stingray Nebula) adapted from Schaefer and Edwards (2015)

In 1995 the central planetary nebula nucleus was observed as a DA white dwarf, having seemingly faded by a factor of three between 1987 and 1995. The white dwarf has an estimated mass of 0.6 M_{☉} and luminosity of 3,000 L_{☉} and has an observed companion star separated by 0.3 arcsecond. The mass of the nebula is estimated as 0.015 M_{☉}.

In 1998 Bobrowsky et al. described how the Hubble Space Telescope observations revealed a 17th-magnitude companion to the Stingray's 15th-magnitude central star.

The central star is unusual in that it has brightened and faded over a period of 20 years. Its temperature went up by 40,000 °C. An explanation for this is that it has undergone a helium flash.

In January 2021, NASA discovered that the nebula had been fading since the 1990s, when it reached its peak brightness. Previously photoionized, the positive ions of the nebula have been recombining with the electrons. In a NASA statement a team member, Martín A. Guerrero of the Instituto de Astrofísica de Andalucía in Granada, Spain, said: "This is very, very dramatic, and very weird. What we're witnessing is a nebula's evolution in real time. In a span of years, we see variations in the nebula. We have not seen that before with the clarity we get with this view."

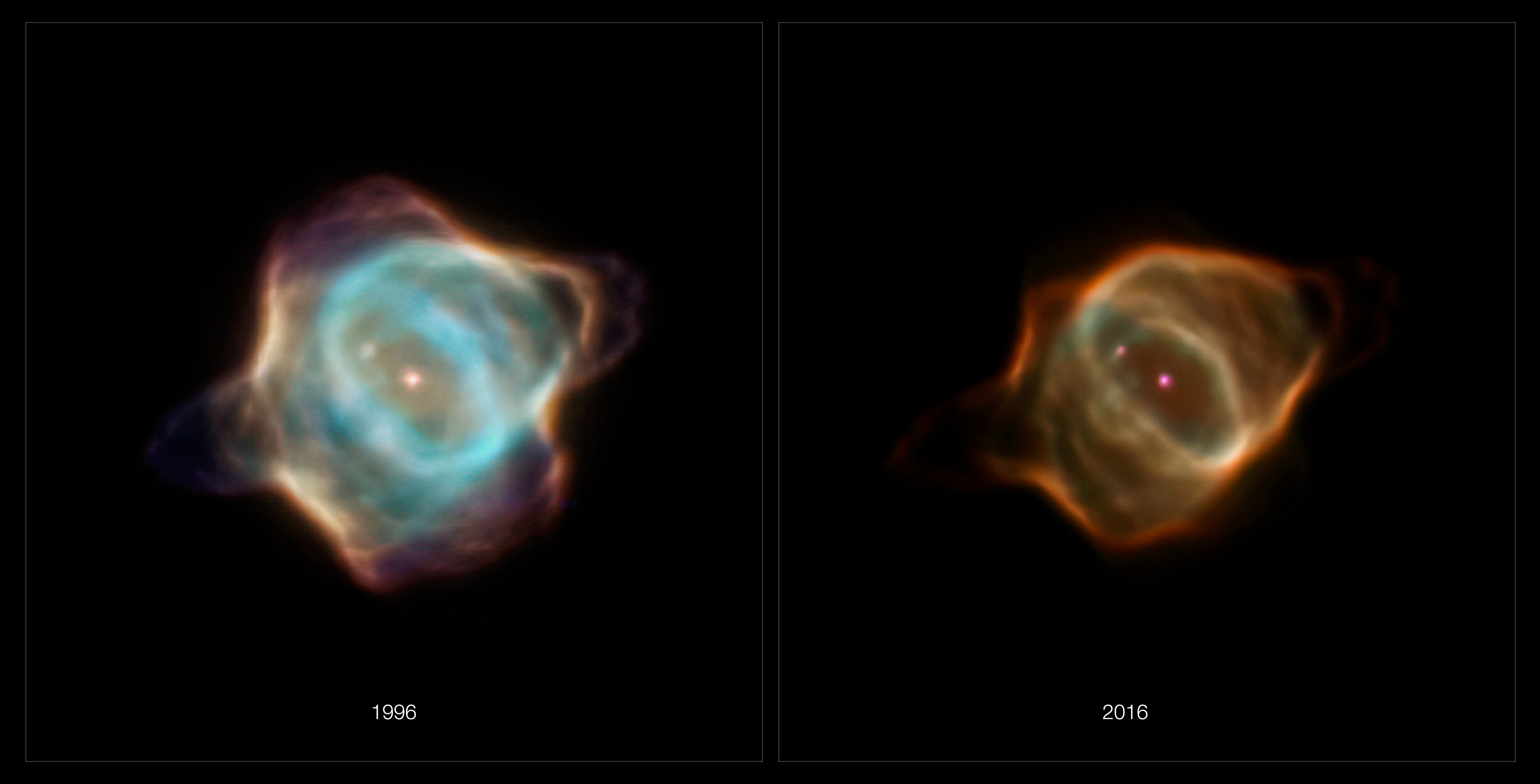
Two images captured in 1996 and 2016 show the nebula dimming and changing shape.
