= HR 6384 =

Star in the constellation Ara

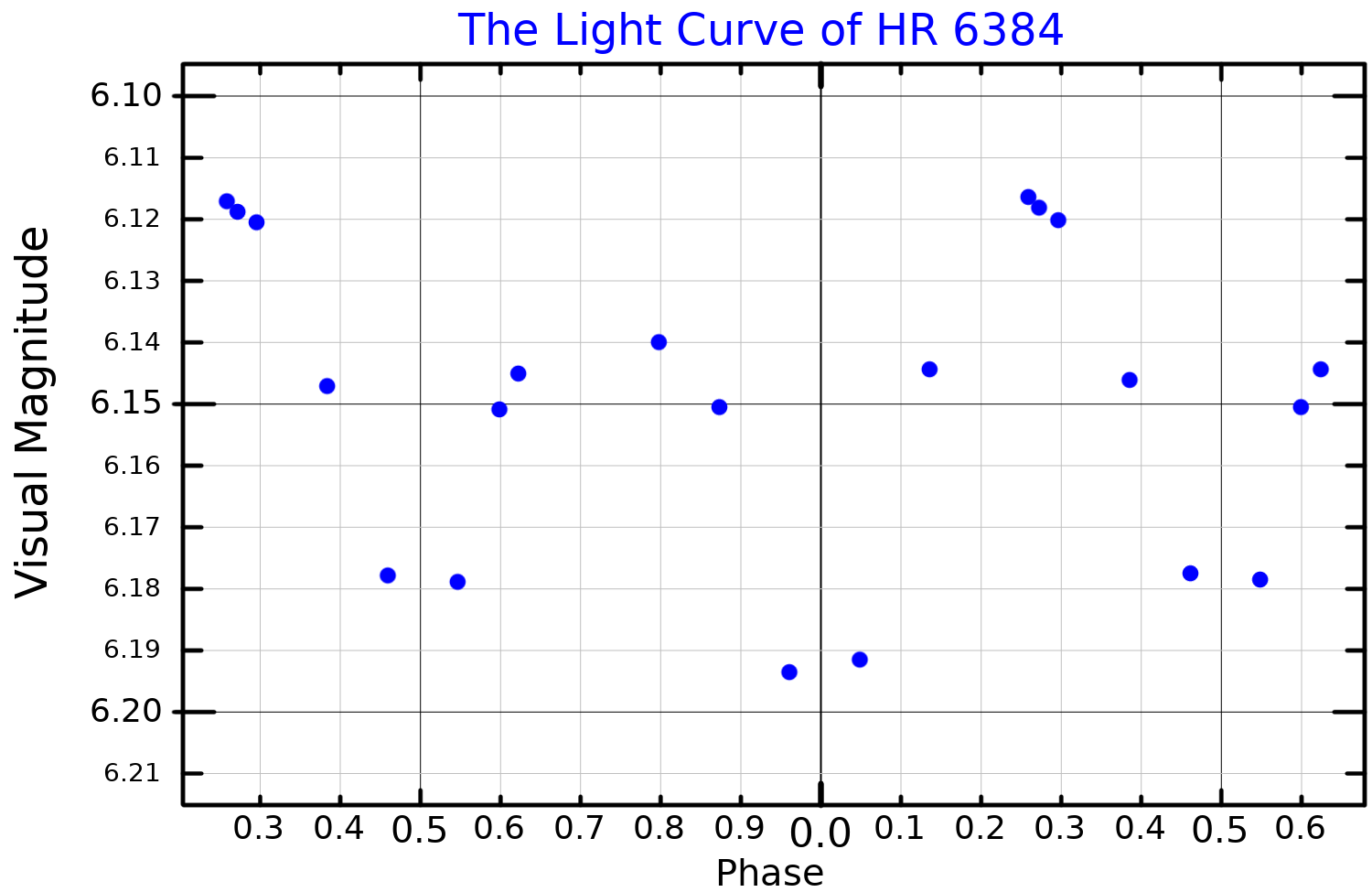
- The visual band light curve of HR 6384, adapted from Walker et al. (1985)

Observation data Epoch J2000 Equinox J2000
- Constellation: Ara
- Right ascension: 17^{h} 14^{m} 13.40536^{s}
- Declination: −56° 53′ 18.6897″
- Apparent magnitude (V): 6.153

Characteristics
- Evolutionary stage: AGB
- Spectral type: M1/M2II/III + A
- U−B color index: +1.340
- B−V color index: +1.787
- Variable type: ellipsoidal variable

Astrometry
Radial velocity (R_{v})	−34.0±4.0 km/s
Proper motion (μ)	RA: +2.760 mas/yr Dec.: −7.033 mas/yr
Parallax (π)	2.2407±0.1939 mas
Distance	1,500 ± 100 ly (450 ± 40 pc)
Absolute magnitude (M_{V})	−2.20

Details
Radius	160.39+9.31 −23.02 R_{☉}
Luminosity	3,732±368 L_{☉}
Temperature	3,562+287 −99 K

Other designations
- V829 Ara, CD−56°6744, HD 155341, HIP 84311, HR 6384, SAO 244539

Database references
SIMBAD	data

HR 6384 is a binary star system in the southern constellation of Ara, the Altar. The system is faintly visible to the naked eye with a combined apparent visual magnitude that fluctuates around 6.153, and it is located at a distance of approximately 1,300 light-years (400 parsecs) from the Sun. It is drifting closer with a radial velocity of around −34 km/s.

In 1985, W. S. G. Walker et al. announced that HR 6384 is a variable star, based on three color photometry undertaken at Auckland Observatory in New Zealand. It was given its variable star designation, V829 Arae, in 1987.

The system appears to be a close, interacting binary with a hot secondary component of class A or hotter. It forms a suspected ellipsoidal variable with a period of 80 days and an amplitude variation of 0.08 in magnitude. The primary component is an aging red giant/bright giant with a stellar classification of M1/M2II/III, currently on the asymptotic giant branch. With the supply of hydrogen at its core exhausted, it has expanded to 160 times the girth of the Sun. It is radiating 3,562 times the luminosity of the Sun from its enlarged photosphere at an effective temperature of 3,562 K.
