= HD 150576 =

Star in the constellation Ara

Observation data Epoch J2000 Equinox ICRS
- Constellation: Ara
- Right ascension: 16^{h} 44^{m} 39.74420^{s}
- Declination: −53° 09′ 08.3343″
- Apparent magnitude (V): 5.96

Characteristics
- Spectral type: G8III
- B−V color index: +1.26

Astrometry
Radial velocity (R_{v})	−2.4 km/s
Proper motion (μ)	RA: −10.00 mas/yr Dec.: −10.42 mas/yr
Parallax (π)	4.48±0.39 mas
Distance	730 ± 60 ly (220 ± 20 pc)
Absolute magnitude (M_{V})	−0.76

Details
Mass	2.3 M_{☉}
Radius	33 R_{☉}
Luminosity	403 L_{☉}
Surface gravity (log g)	2.33 cgs
Temperature	4,476 K
Metallicity [Fe/H]	−0.18 dex
Rotational velocity (v sin i)	4.2 km/s

Other designations
- FK5 3327, HD 150576, HIP 81966, HR 6207, SAO 244106

Database references
SIMBAD	data

HD 150576 is a double star in the southern constellation of Ara. It has a twelfth magnitude companion at an angular separation of 28.3″ along a position angle of 39° (as of 2000).
