= Pi Arae =

Star in the constellation Ara

- Location of π Arae (dot within red circle)

Observation data Epoch J2000 Equinox J2000
- Constellation: Ara
- Right ascension: 17^{h} 38^{m} 05.515^{s}
- Declination: −54° 30′ 01.56″
- Apparent magnitude (V): +5.25

Characteristics
- Spectral type: A5 IV-V
- B−V color index: +0.20

Astrometry
Radial velocity (R_{v})	−2.11±0.22 km/s
Proper motion (μ)	RA: −50.775 mas/yr Dec.: −149.745 mas/yr
Parallax (π)	24.3817±0.0805 mas
Distance	133.8 ± 0.4 ly (41.0 ± 0.1 pc)
Absolute magnitude (M_{V})	+2.01

Details
Mass	1.73 M_{☉}
Radius	1.90 R_{☉}
Luminosity	13.3 L_{☉}
Surface gravity (log g)	4.36 cgs
Temperature	8,215±279 K
Metallicity [Fe/H]	+0.13 dex
Rotational velocity (v sin i)	54.1±0.4 km/s
Age	319 Myr

Other designations
- π Ara, CPD−54°8403, GC 23862, GJ 683, HD 159492, HIP 86305, HR 6549, SAO 244896, PPM 346165

Database references
SIMBAD	data

Pi Arae is a star in the southern constellation of Ara. Its name is a Bayer designation that is Latinized from π Arae, and abbreviated Pi Ara or π Ara. This star is faintly visible to the naked eye with an apparent visual magnitude of +5.25. Based upon an annual parallax shift of 24.38 mas as seen from Earth, it is located 134 light-years (41 pc) from the Sun. It is moving closer to the Sun with a radial velocity of −2 km/s.

The stellar classification of this star is A5 IV-V, indicating the spectrum displays the hybrid features of both a main sequence and a more evolved subgiant star. Pi Arae is an estimated 319 million years old and is spinning with a projected rotational velocity of 54.1 km/s. The star has 1.73 times the mass of the Sun and 1.90 times the Sun's radius. It is radiating 13.3 times the Sun's luminosity from its photosphere at an effective temperature of about 8,215 K.

Pi Arae displays an excess emission of infrared radiation, which may be explained by circumstellar dust. The thermal emission matches a two component model, consisting of an inner disk of warm crystalline silicate dust and an outer colder disk of dirty ice. The inner disk has a temperature of 173 K and is orbiting roughly 9.1 AU from the host star. The outer disk is 77 K and orbits at a distance of about 117.3 AU. The small size of some of the dust grains indicate the inner disk may have formed relatively recently from collisions between orbiting planetesimals.

Located 55 arc minutes to the north of Pi Arae is the globular cluster NGC 6397.
