= HD 157819 =

Star in the constellation Ara

Observation data Epoch J2000 Equinox ICRS
- Constellation: Ara
- Right ascension: 17^{h} 28^{m} 38.91416^{s}
- Declination: −55° 10′ 10.8720″
- Apparent magnitude (V): 5.94

Characteristics
- Spectral type: G8 II-III
- B−V color index: +1.11

Astrometry
Radial velocity (R_{v})	−12.6±0.4 km/s
Proper motion (μ)	RA: +2.52 mas/yr Dec.: −8.92 mas/yr
Parallax (π)	3.31±0.41 mas
Distance	approx. 1,000 ly (approx. 300 pc)
Absolute magnitude (M_{V})	−2.9

Details
Mass	2.5 M_{☉}
Radius	31 R_{☉}
Luminosity	444 L_{☉}
Surface gravity (log g)	2.22 cgs
Temperature	4,895 K
Metallicity [Fe/H]	−0.13 dex
Rotational velocity (v sin i)	6.4 km/s

Other designations
- HD 157819, HIP 85520, HR 6487, SAO 244770

Database references
SIMBAD	data

HD 157819 is the Henry Draper Catalogue designation for a star in the southern constellation of Ara. It is faintly visible to the naked eye at an apparent visual magnitude of 5.94 and is approximately 1,000 light-years (310 parsecs) distant from the Earth. The spectrum of this star fits a stellar classification of G8 II-III, indicating it is a G-type star that is somewhere between a giant and bright giant.
