= HD 165493 =

Star in the constellation Ara

Observation data Epoch J2000 Equinox ICRS
- Constellation: Ara
- Right ascension: 18^{h} 08^{m} 30.10807^{s}
- Declination: −45° 46′ 01.2534″
- Apparent magnitude (V): 6.153 (6.15 + 9.55)

Characteristics
- Spectral type: B7.5II
- U−B color index: −0.49
- B−V color index: −0.08

Astrometry
Radial velocity (R_{v})	−35.0±4.3 km/s
Proper motion (μ)	RA: −2.88 mas/yr Dec.: −17.29 mas/yr
Parallax (π)	3.68±0.60 mas
Distance	approx. 900 ly (approx. 270 pc)
Absolute magnitude (M_{V})	−0.97

Details

HD 165493 A
Mass	4.2 M_{☉}
Radius	5.4 R_{☉}
Luminosity	521 L_{☉}
Surface gravity (log g)	3,58 cgs
Temperature	12,849 K

Other designations
- CD−45 12215, HD 165493, HIP 88859, HR 6759, SAO 228734, WDS J18085-4546AB

Database references
SIMBAD	data
- B

HD 165493 is double star in the southern constellation of Ara. As of 2011, the two components have an angular separation of 4″ along a position angle of 257°.
