= HD 157753 =

Star in the constellation Ara

Observation data Epoch J2000 Equinox ICRS
- Constellation: Ara
- Right ascension: 17^{h} 27^{m} 57.60133^{s}
- Declination: −52° 17′ 49.7149″
- Apparent magnitude (V): 5.75

Characteristics
- Spectral type: K2III
- B−V color index: +1.17

Astrometry
Radial velocity (R_{v})	−8.70 km/s
Proper motion (μ)	RA: −5.244 mas/yr Dec.: −72.181 mas/yr
Parallax (π)	9.2351±0.0635 mas
Distance	353 ± 2 ly (108.3 ± 0.7 pc)
Absolute magnitude (M_{V})	+0.53

Details
Mass	1.4 M_{☉}
Radius	15 R_{☉}
Luminosity	68 L_{☉}
Surface gravity (log g)	2.46 cgs
Temperature	4,330 K
Metallicity [Fe/H]	−0.06 dex
Rotational velocity (v sin i)	<1.0 km/s

Other designations
- FK5 3386, HD 157753, HIP 85470, HR 6483, SAO 244763

Database references
SIMBAD	data

HD 157753 is giant star in the southern constellation of Ara. It may be an astrometric binary, and it has a faint, magnitude 13 companion at an angular separation of 31.5″ along a position angle of 356° (as of 2000).
