= HD 156331 =

Star in the constellation Ara

Observation data Epoch J2000 Equinox ICRS
- Constellation: Ara
- Right ascension: 17^{h} 19^{m} 30.51713^{s}
- Declination: −50° 03′ 49.5490″
- Apparent magnitude (V): 6.27 (7.0 + 7.0)

Characteristics
- Spectral type: F8III + B9V
- B−V color index: +0.41

Astrometry
Radial velocity (R_{v})	+10.50±1.2 km/s
Proper motion (μ)	RA: +8.76 mas/yr Dec.: −32.86 mas/yr
Parallax (π)	16.94±0.51 mas
Distance	193 ± 6 ly (59 ± 2 pc)
Absolute magnitude (M_{V})	+2.42

Other designations
- CD−49°11324, HD 156331, HIP 84759, HR 6423, SAO 244631

Database references
SIMBAD	data

HD 156331 is double star in the southern constellation of Ara. As of 2014, the pair have an angular separation of less than an arc second along a position angle of 49°.
