= HD 156768 =

Double star in the constellation Ara

Observation data Epoch J2000 Equinox J2000
Constellation	Ara
- A
Right ascension	17^{h} 22^{m} 55.22140^{s}
Declination	−58° 00′ 37.1789″
- Apparent magnitude (V): 6.1
- B
Right ascension	17^{h} 22^{m} 55.20446^{s}
Declination	−58° 00′ 38.9718″
- Apparent magnitude (V): 9.6

Characteristics

A
- Spectral type: G8Ib/II
- U−B color index: +0.86
- B−V color index: +1.07

B
- B−V color index: +0.39

Astrometry
Absolute magnitude (M_{V})	−1.69

A
Radial velocity (R_{v})	−9.42±0.13 km/s
Proper motion (μ)	RA: −5.959 mas/yr Dec.: −15.651 mas/yr
Parallax (π)	3.1386±0.0412 mas
Distance	1,040 ± 10 ly (319 ± 4 pc)

B
Radial velocity (R_{v})	−9.80±0.20 km/s
Proper motion (μ)	RA: −6.006 mas/yr Dec.: −14.316 mas/yr
Parallax (π)	2.9305±0.0404 mas
Distance	1,110 ± 20 ly (341 ± 5 pc)

Details

HD 156768 A
Mass	4.5 M_{☉}
Radius	37 R_{☉}
Luminosity	527 L_{☉}
Surface gravity (log g)	1.76 cgs
Temperature	4,580 K
Rotational velocity (v sin i)	2.6±1.0 km/s

HD 156768 B
Mass	1.6 M_{☉}
Surface gravity (log g)	3.79 cgs
Temperature	6,592 K
Metallicity [Fe/H]	−0.11 dex

Other designations
- CPD−57°8478, HD 156768, HIP 85049, HR 6438, SAO 244678

Database references
SIMBAD	data

HD 156768 is a double star in the southern constellation of Ara, with a combined apparent magnitude of 5.86. The brighter component is a sixth magnitude bright giant or supergiant star with a stellar classification of G8Ib/II. The magnitude 9.6 companion lies at an angular separation of 1.81″ along a position angle of 184°.
