= HD 151566 =

Double Star in the constellation Ara

Observation data Epoch J2000 Equinox J2000
- Constellation: Ara
- Right ascension: 16^{h} 50^{m} 36.07960^{s}
- Declination: −50° 02′ 41.8040″
- Apparent magnitude (V): 6.45 (7.17 + 7.33)‍

Characteristics
- Spectral type: A5III + F7III
- U−B color index: +0.07
- B−V color index: +0.33

Astrometry
| Radial velocity (R_{v}) | 24.6±1.6 km/s |
| Proper motion (μ) | RA: -7.97 mas/yr Dec.: -2.84 mas/yr |
| Parallax (π) | 6.19±1.22 mas |
| Distance | approx. 500 ly (approx. 160 pc) |
| Absolute magnitude (M_{V}) | +0.51 |

Details

A
| Mass | 1.8 M_{☉} |
| Radius | 2.6 R_{☉} |
| Luminosity | 15 L_{☉} |
| Temperature | 7,053 K |
| Age | 1.3 Gyr |

B
| Mass | 1.6 M_{☉} |
| Radius | 2.7 R_{☉} |
| Luminosity | 18 L_{☉} |
| Surface gravity (log g) | 3.78 cgs |
| Temperature | 7,217 K |

Other designations
- CD−49°10998, HD 151566, HIP 82418, HR 6236

Database references
| SIMBAD | data |

HD 151566 is double star in the southern constellation of Ara. As of 1991, the pair had an angular separation of 3.10″ along a position angle of 42°.
