= HD 153053 =

Star in the constellation Ara

Observation data Epoch J2000 Equinox J2000
- Constellation: Ara
- Right ascension: 17^{h} 00^{m} 06.27939^{s}
- Declination: −54° 35′ 49.8371″
- Apparent magnitude (V): 5.65

Characteristics
- Evolutionary stage: main sequence
- Spectral type: A5 IV-V
- U−B color index: 0.1
- B−V color index: +0.19

Astrometry
Radial velocity (R_{v})	−20.2 km/s
Proper motion (μ)	RA: −7.70 mas/yr Dec.: −72.18 mas/yr
Parallax (π)	19.30±0.35 mas
Distance	169 ± 3 ly (51.8 ± 0.9 pc)
Absolute magnitude (M_{V})	+2.07

Details
Mass	1.8 M_{☉}
Luminosity	12.3 L_{☉}
Temperature	8,000 K
Rotational velocity (v sin i)	102.8±0.7 km/s
Age	420 Myr

Other designations
- CPD−54°7947, HD 153053, HIP 83187, HR 6297, SAO 244338

Database references
SIMBAD	data

HD 153053 is double star in the southern constellation of Ara. The brighter component is an A-type main sequence star that may be evolving into a subgiant. It has a twelfth magnitude visual companion at an angular separation of 24.7″ along a position angle of 52°. Mostly likely the two are isolated stars that happen to lie near the same line of sight.

This star displays an excess emission of infrared radiation, suggesting the presence of a disk of dusty debris. This disk is orbiting at a radius of 49 AU from the host star.
