= HD 153791 =

Star in the constellation Ara

Observation data Epoch J2000 Equinox ICRS
- Constellation: Ara
- Right ascension: 17^{h} 03^{m} 41.68344^{s}
- Declination: −47° 09′ 38.0565″
- Apparent magnitude (V): 6.07

Characteristics
- Spectral type: A5V
- B−V color index: +0.07

Astrometry
Radial velocity (R_{v})	3.8±0.5 km/s
Proper motion (μ)	RA: +0.04 mas/yr Dec.: +5.36 mas/yr
Parallax (π)	6.61±0.44 mas
Distance	490 ± 30 ly (150 ± 10 pc)
Absolute magnitude (M_{V})	+0.18

Details
Luminosity	66.6 L_{☉}
Temperature	8,346 K
Rotational velocity (v sin i)	70 km/s

Other designations
- CD−46°11191, HD 153791, HIP 83481, HR 6323, SAO 227588

Database references
SIMBAD	data

HD 153791 is a double star in the southern constellation of Ara. The primary is a sixth magnitude A-type main sequence star. It has a magnitude 12.3 companion at an angular separation of 6.0″ along a position angle of 249°, as of 1999.
