= HD 157661 =

Star in the constellation Ara

Observation data Epoch J2000 Equinox ICRS
- Constellation: Ara
- HD 157661
- Right ascension: 17^{h} 26^{m} 51.97802^{s}
- Declination: −45° 50′ 34.9096″
- Apparent magnitude (V): 5.70/6.46
- HD 157649
- Right ascension: 17^{h} 26^{m} 44.66241^{s}
- Declination: −45° 49′ 26.0995″
- Apparent magnitude (V): 7.11

Characteristics

HD 157661
- Spectral type: B7V + B9.5V
- U−B color index: −0.34
- B−V color index: −0.07

HD 157649
- Spectral type: B9.5V

Astrometry

HD 157661
Radial velocity (R_{v})	+8 km/s
Proper motion (μ)	RA: −6.46 mas/yr Dec.: −27.91 mas/yr
Parallax (π)	5.13±0.72 mas
Distance	approx. 640 ly (approx. 190 pc)
Absolute magnitude (M_{V})	−1.12

HD 157649
Proper motion (μ)	RA: −5.818 mas/yr Dec.: −28.942 mas/yr
Parallax (π)	5.2246±0.0657 mas
Distance	624 ± 8 ly (191 ± 2 pc)

Details

A
Mass	3.03 M_{☉}
Radius	4.49 R_{☉}
Luminosity	317 L_{☉}
Surface gravity (log g)	3.61 cgs
Temperature	11,493 K

B
Mass	3.31 M_{☉}

HD 157649
Mass	2.65 M_{☉}
Radius	2.88 R_{☉}
Luminosity	69 L_{☉}
Surface gravity (log g)	3.85 cgs
Temperature	10,189 K
Rotation	27.152 days
Age	327 Myr

Other designations
- HD 157661: CD−45 11531, HD 157661, HIP 85389, HR 6477
- HD 157649: CD−45 11527, HD 157649

Database references
SIMBAD	data
- A
- B
- HD 157649

HD 157661 is the Henry Draper Catalogue designation for a likely triple star in the southern constellation of Ara. With a measured annual parallax of 5.13 mas, is located at a distance of approximately 640 light-years (200 parsecs) from Earth. The combined apparent visual magnitude of the stars is 5.29, which means it is faintly visible to the naked eye.

The inner components of this system consist of a pair of B-type main sequence stars. The brighter star has a magnitude of 5.70 and a stellar classification of B7 V. At an angular separation of 2.115 arcseconds is the magnitude 6.46 secondary component, which has a classification of B9.5 V. The third member of the system is HD 157649, a 7.6 magnitude A-type star at a separation of 103 arcseconds.
