= HD 154857 =

Star in the constellation of Ara

Observation data Epoch J2000 Equinox ICRS
- Constellation: Ara
- Right ascension: 17^{h} 11^{m} 15.72205^{s}
- Declination: −56° 40′ 50.8712″
- Apparent magnitude (V): 7.25

Characteristics
- Evolutionary stage: subgiant
- Spectral type: G5IV-V
- B−V color index: 0.699±0.001
- Variable type: Constant

Astrometry
Radial velocity (R_{v})	+28.10±0.12 km/s
Proper motion (μ)	RA: +87.442 mas/yr Dec.: −55.861 mas/yr
Parallax (π)	15.8176±0.0197 mas
Distance	206.2 ± 0.3 ly (63.22 ± 0.08 pc)
Absolute magnitude (M_{V})	3.07

Details
Mass	1.718+0.03 −0.022 M_{☉}
Radius	2.1±0.1 R_{☉}
Luminosity	4.4±0.3 L_{☉}
Surface gravity (log g)	3.83±0.03 cgs
Temperature	5,740±46 K
Metallicity [Fe/H]	−0.26±0.01 dex
Rotational velocity (v sin i)	1.44±0.50 km/s
Age	5.8±0.5 Gyr

Other designations
- CD−56°6717, CPD−56°8059, GC 23146, HD 154857, HIP 84069, SAO 244491, PPM 345752, TYC 8735-1682-1, GSC 08735-01682

Database references
SIMBAD	data

HD 154857 is a star with two exoplanetary companions in the southern constellation of Ara. It is too dim to be visible with the naked eye having an apparent visual magnitude of 7.25. The star is located at a distance of 206 light years from the Sun based on parallax measurements, and is drifting further away with a radial velocity of +28 km/s.

This is a G-type star with a stellar classification of G5IV-V. The absolute magnitude of this star is two magnitudes above the main sequence, which suggests that the star is evolving toward the subgiant stage. It is a metal-poor thin disk star approximately six billion years old and is chromopherically quiet although not in a Maunder Minimum state. The star is larger, more massive, and more luminous than the Sun. It is spinning with a projected rotational velocity of 1.4 km/s.

== Planetary system ==
The discovery of one confirmed and one unconfirmed Jovian exoplanet was reported in 2004 and 2007 respectively. The first planet HD 154857 b has mass >1.8 times that of Jupiter. It orbits the star 20% further than Earth-Sun distance, taking 409 days with 47% eccentricity. The additional object (HD 154857 c) was confirmed as a planetary companion in January 2014.

The HD 154857 planetary system
Companion (in order from star)	Mass	Semimajor axis (AU)	Orbital period (days)	Eccentricity	Inclination (°)	Radius
b	≥ 2.24±0.05 M_{J}	1.291±0.008	408.6±0.5	0.06±0.05	—	—
c	≥ 2.58±0.16 M_{J}	5.36±0.09	3,452±105	0.06±0.05	—	—

== See also ==
- List of extrasolar planets
