= HD 153261 =

Star in the constellation Ara

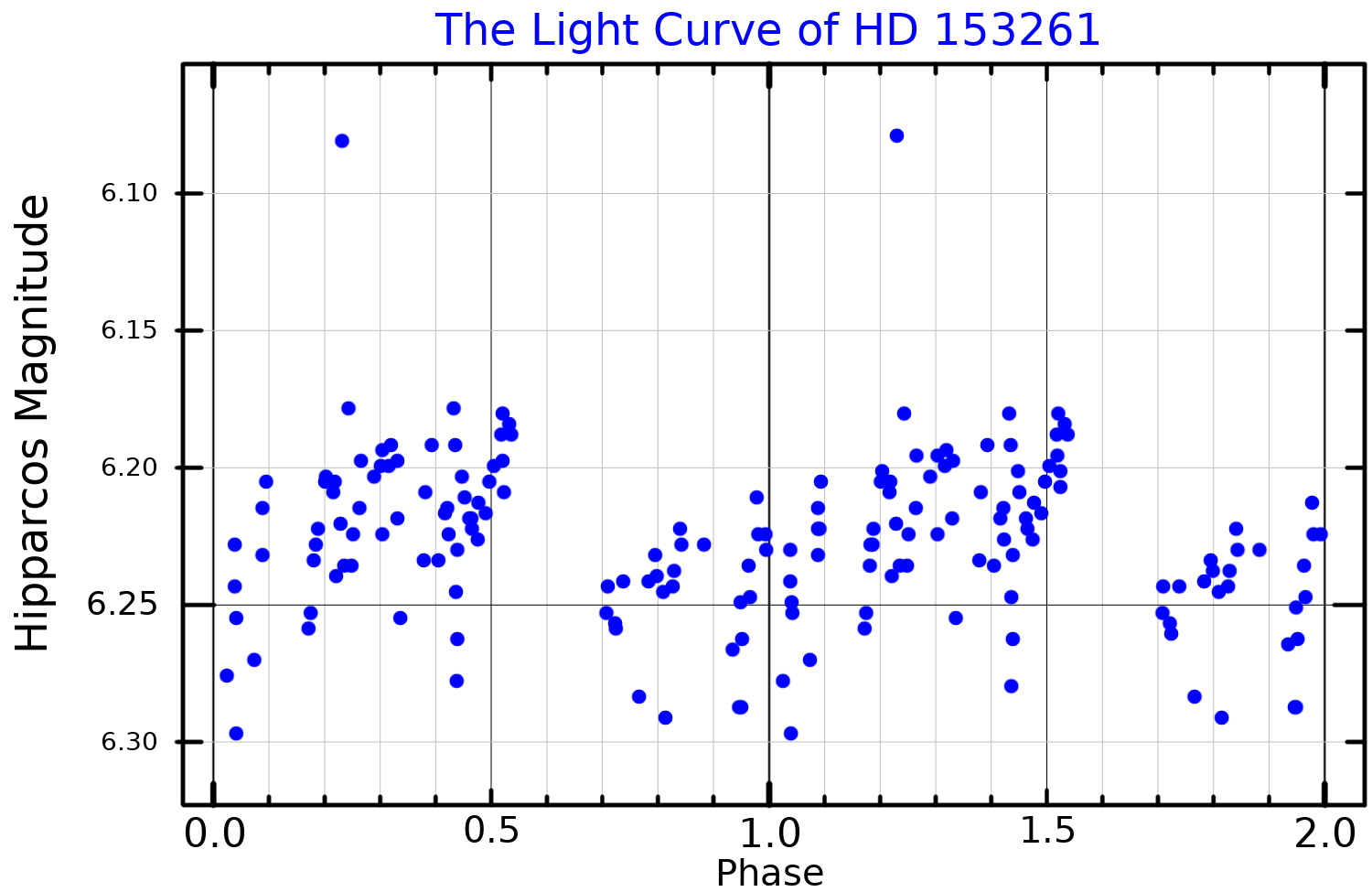
- A light curve for HD 153261 from Hipparcos data, adapted from Lefèvre et al. (2009)

Observation data Epoch J2000 Equinox J2000
- Constellation: Ara
- Right ascension: 17^{h} 01^{m} 47.3875^{s}
- Declination: –58° 57′ 29.681″
- Apparent magnitude (V): 6.137

Characteristics
- Spectral type: B1 V:ne or B2 IVne
- U−B color index: –0.956
- B−V color index: –0.078

Astrometry
Radial velocity (R_{v})	–6 km/s
Proper motion (μ)	RA: –2.91 mas/yr Dec.: –9.01 mas/yr
Parallax (π)	2.32±0.38 mas
Distance	approx. 1,400 ly (approx. 430 pc)

Details
Mass	10.1 ± 0.3 M_{☉}
Radius	4.5 R_{☉}
Luminosity (bolometric)	11,045 L_{☉}
Temperature	21,150 K
Age	20.4 ± 0.4 Myr

Other designations
- CD–58 6607, HD 153261, HIP 83323, HR 6304, SAO 244362, V828 Arae.

Database references
SIMBAD	data

HD 153261 is the Henry Draper Catalogue designation for a star in the southern constellation of Ara. It has an apparent visual magnitude of 6.137, placing it near the threshold of naked eye visibility. According to the Bortle Dark-Sky Scale, it can be viewed from dark suburban or rural skies. Based upon an annual parallax shift of just 2.32 mas, it is located at a distance of around 1,400 light-years (430 parsecs) from Earth.

In 1983, Christopher Stagg reported that he suspected that HD 153261 is a variable star, and his later observations confirmed that it is in fact variable. HD 153261 was given its variable star designation, V828 Arae, in 1987.

This star has been catalogued with a stellar classification of B1 V:ne or B2 IVne, indicating that it is either a main sequence or a subgiant star. The 'n' indicates a nebulous spectrum created by the Doppler shift-broadened absorption lines from a rapid rotation, while the 'e' means this is a Be star, with the spectrum showing emission lines from hot, circumstellar gas. HD 153261 displays some variability with an amplitude of 0.090 in magnitude, and is a suspected spectroscopic binary.

HD 153261 is a large star with over ten times the Sun's mass and around 4.5 the radius of the Sun. It shines with more than 11,000 times the brightness of the Sun, with this energy being radiated into space at an effective temperature of 21,150 K. At this heat, it glows with the blue-white hue of a B-type star.
