= HD 153201 =

Star in the constellation Ara

Observation data Epoch J2000 Equinox ICRS
- Constellation: Ara
- Right ascension: 17^{h} 01^{m} 07.02279^{s}
- Declination: −56° 33′ 18.2902″
- Apparent magnitude (V): 6.38

Characteristics
- Spectral type: B9 Si
- B−V color index: 0.06
- Variable type: α^{2} CVn

Astrometry
Radial velocity (R_{v})	0.2 km/s
Proper motion (μ)	RA: −3.88 mas/yr Dec.: −27.06 mas/yr
Parallax (π)	4.99±0.71 mas
Distance	approx. 650 ly (approx. 200 pc)

Details
Mass	2.7 M_{☉}
Radius	4.1 R_{☉}
Luminosity	175 L_{☉}
Surface gravity (log g)	3.63 cgs
Temperature	10.342 K
Rotation	27.15 days
Rotational velocity (v sin i)	45 km/s
Age	186 Myr

Other designations
- CD−56°6647, HD 153201, HIP 83269, SAO 244356

Database references
SIMBAD	data

HD 153201 is a Bp star in the southern constellation of Ara. It is chemically peculiar star that displays an anomalous abundance of the element silicon in its spectrum. This is a suspected variable star of the type known as Alpha^{2} Canum Venaticorum. There is a magnitude 9.86 companion star at an angular separation of 2.30″ along a position angle of 131°.
