= HD 156091 =

Double star in the constellation Ara

Observation data Epoch J2000 Equinox J2000
- Constellation: Ara
- Right ascension: 17^{h} 19^{m} 12.50730^{s}
- Declination: −59° 41′ 40.5989″
- Apparent magnitude (V): 5.91 (5.91 + 13.00)

Characteristics
- Spectral type: K2 IIICNIB/II
- B−V color index: 1.37

Astrometry
Radial velocity (R_{v})	−5.0±0.4 km/s
Proper motion (μ)	RA: −3.15 mas/yr Dec.: −8.05 mas/yr
Parallax (π)	1.31±0.36 mas
Distance	approx. 2,500 ly (approx. 800 pc)
Absolute magnitude (M_{V})	−0.11

Details
Mass	8.4±1.0 M_{☉}
Luminosity	4,266 L_{☉}
Temperature	4,306 K
Age	33.7±8.6 Myr

Other designations
- CD−59°6506, HD 156091, HIP 84731, HR 6408, SAO 244613

Database references
SIMBAD	data

HD 156091 is a double star in the southern constellation of Ara. The primary is a sixth magnitude giant star with stronger than normal lines of carbon, nitrogen, and barium in its spectrum. The companion is a 13th magnitude star at an angular separation of 27.4″ along a position angle of 275°, as of 2000.
