= S Arae =

Variable star in the constellation Ara

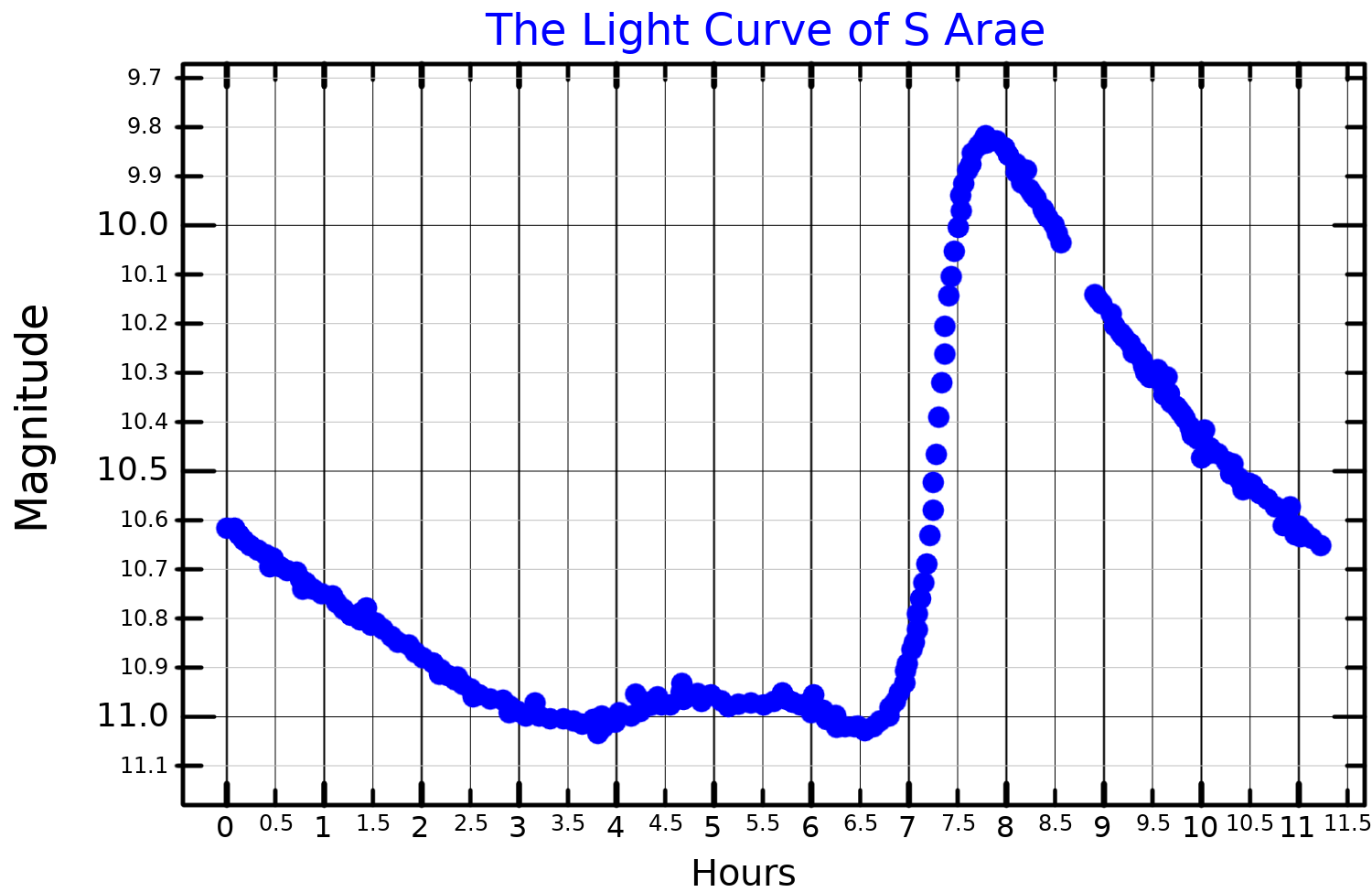
- A light curve for S Arae, adapted from Chadid et al. (2010)

Observation data Epoch J2000.0 Equinox J2000.0 (ICRS)
- Constellation: Ara
- Right ascension: 17^{h} 59^{m} 10.7311^{s}
- Declination: −49° 26′ 00.453″
- Apparent magnitude (V): 9.92 to 11.24

Characteristics
- Spectral type: A3 II
- B−V color index: 0.9
- Variable type: RRab

Astrometry
Radial velocity (R_{v})	185 ± 655.35 km/s
Proper motion (μ)	RA: −26.24 mas/yr Dec.: −8.44 mas/yr
Parallax (π)	1.1191±0.0431 mas
Distance	2,900 ± 100 ly (890 ± 30 pc)
Absolute magnitude (M_{V})	+0.78 – +0.93

Details
Mass	0.51 – 0.62 M_{☉}
Radius	3.01 R_{☉}
Luminosity	27 L_{☉}
Surface gravity (log g)	+2.9 cgs
Temperature	6,563 K
Metallicity [Fe/H]	−0.90 dex

Other designations
- S Ara, CD−49°11833, CPD−49°10361, HIP 88064

Database references
SIMBAD	data

S Arae (S Ara) is an RR Lyrae-type pulsating variable star in the constellation of Ara. It has an apparent visual magnitude which varies between 9.92 and 11.24 during its 10.85-hour pulsation period, and it exhibits the Blazhko effect.

In 1896 David Gill and Jacobus Kapteyn announced that the variability of the as yet unnamed star was "all but proved" by the Cape Carte du Ciel photographic plates. In 1900, Robert T. A. Innes confirmed that the star, by then named CPD-49 10361, is a variable. It was listed with its modern variable star designation, S Arae, in Annie Jump Cannon's 1907 Second Catalogue of Variable Stars.

It was originally thought that S Arae was a binary whose brightness changes were caused by eclipses. In 1918, Harlow Shapley included it within the Cepheid variable star class. By 1939 it had been classified as an RR Lyrae variable.

S Arae's large negative declination makes it a circumpolar star in Antarctica. Such a star can be monitored continuously for much of the southern hemisphere's winter, allowing a long period of observation without gaps due to daylight. It was the first star to be monitored that way at Dome C. RRab type stars, like S Arae, are fundamental mode pulsating stars that have asymmetric light curves which rise to maximum brightness rapidly then fade more slowly. The Blazhko effect modulation period for this star is 47.264 days (about 105 times longer than the main pulsation period), and three other periodicities have been detected in the light curve.
