= HD 149837 =

Binary star in the constellation Ara

Observation data Epoch J2000 Equinox J2000
Constellation	Ara
- A
Right ascension	16^{h} 40^{m} 50.48327^{s}
Declination	−60° 26′ 47.2071″
- Apparent magnitude (V): 6.18
- B
Right ascension	16^{h} 40^{m} 50.61454^{s}
Declination	−60° 26′ 45.8673″
- Apparent magnitude (V): 8.98

Characteristics

A
- Evolutionary stage: main sequence
- Spectral type: F6V
- Apparent magnitude (B): 6.660
- Apparent magnitude (J): 5.217
- Apparent magnitude (H): 4.969
- Apparent magnitude (K): 4.886
- B−V color index: +0.17

Astrometry

A
Radial velocity (R_{v})	3.9±0.2 km/s
Proper motion (μ)	RA: +59.084 mas/yr Dec.: −73.274 mas/yr
Parallax (π)	31.3707±0.0212 mas
Distance	103.97 ± 0.07 ly (31.88 ± 0.02 pc)
Absolute magnitude (M_{V})	+3.69

B
Proper motion (μ)	RA: +57.834 mas/yr Dec.: −76.449 mas/yr
Parallax (π)	31.3785±0.0402 mas
Distance	103.9 ± 0.1 ly (31.87 ± 0.04 pc)

Details

A
Mass	1.25 M_{☉}
Radius	1.348 R_{☉}
Luminosity	2.634 L_{☉}
Surface gravity (log g)	4.16 cgs
Temperature	6,401±80 K
Metallicity [Fe/H]	−0.08 dex
Age	2.90 Gyr

B
Mass	0.79 M_{☉}
Radius	0.67 R_{☉}
Luminosity	0.248 L_{☉}
Temperature	4,987 K

Other designations
- CD−60°6381, HD 149837, HIP 81657, HR 6177, SAO 253651

Database references
SIMBAD	data
- B

HD 149837 is a binary star in the southern constellation of Ara. Parallax measurements give a distance of 103.9 light-years.

The components of this system have an estimated separation of 45.8 astronomical units. The primary, of apparent magnitude +6.24, can be viewed to the naked eye only from sufficiently dark skies, far from light pollution. Its spectrum mathces a class of F6V, making it a F-type main-sequence star. Around 1.25 times more massive than the Sun and 2.9 billion years old, it has 1.35 times the Sun's radius and irradiates 2.6 times the Sun's luminosity from its photosphere at an effective temperature of 6,401 K.

The secondary's apparent magnitude is 8.98, too faint to be viewed with the naked eye. It has 0.79 times the mass of the Sun, 0.67 times the radius and irradiates 25% of its luminosity at an effective temperature of 4,987 K.
