= HD 157662 =

Star in the constellation Ara

Observation data Epoch J2000 Equinox ICRS
- Constellation: Ara
- Right ascension: 17^{h} 27^{m} 12.46093^{s}
- Declination: −50° 37′ 49.3379″
- Apparent magnitude (V): 5.905

Characteristics
- Spectral type: B9II
- U−B color index: +0.055
- B−V color index: +0.105

Astrometry
Radial velocity (R_{v})	+11.0 km/s
Proper motion (μ)	RA: +0.19 mas/yr Dec.: −2.53 mas/yr
Parallax (π)	1.10±0.38 mas
Distance	approx. 3,000 ly (approx. 900 pc)

Details
Mass	7.87±1.68 M_{☉}
Luminosity	8,214 L_{☉}
Temperature	10,650 K

Other designations
- CD−50°11283, HD 157662, HIP 85409, HR 6478, SAO 244755

Database references
SIMBAD	data

HD 157662 is a bright giant star in the southern constellation of Ara. It has a magnitude 10.91 companion at an angular separation of 76.4″ along a position angle of 159°.
