= HD 160342 =

Star in the constellation Ara

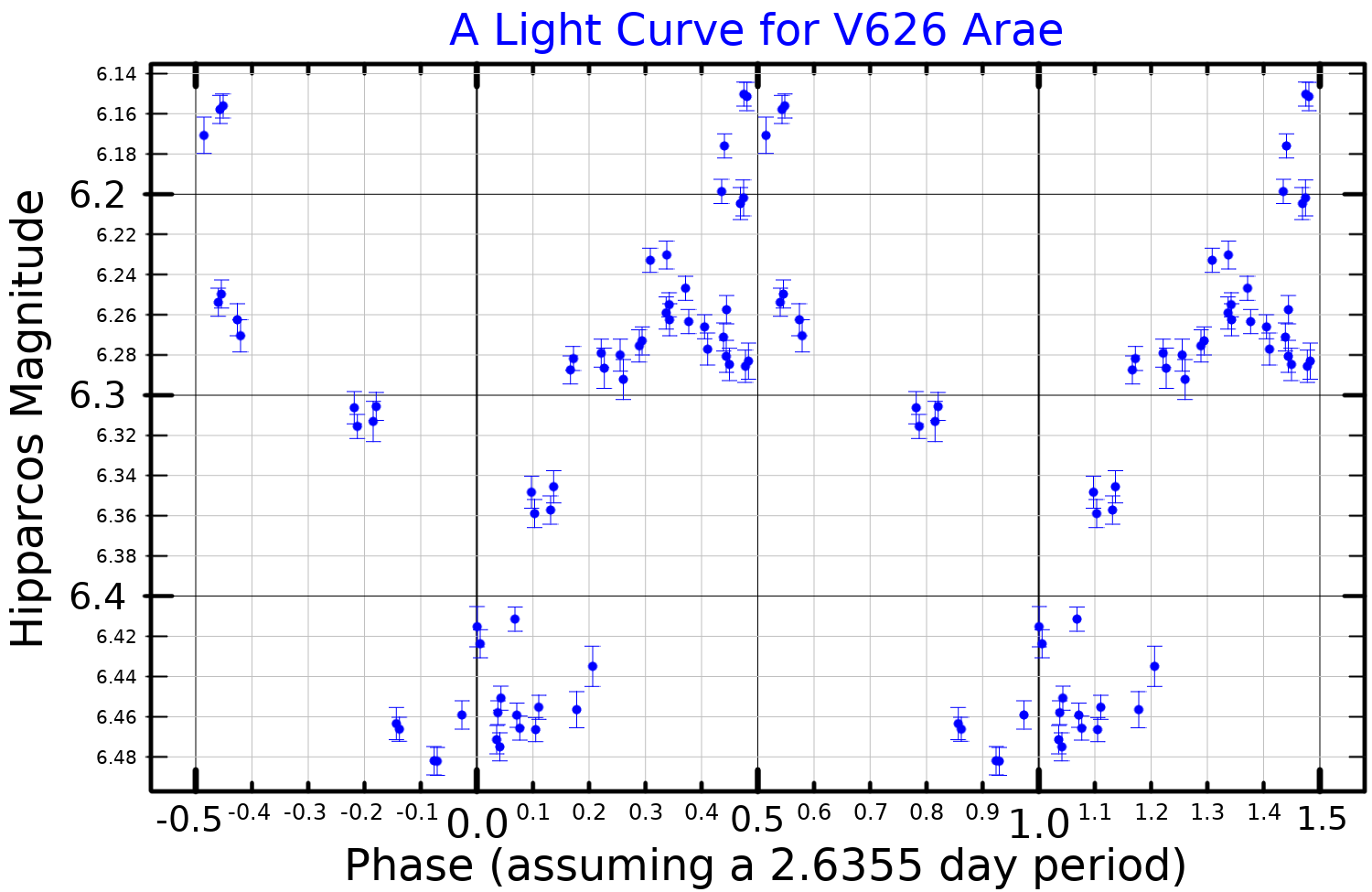
- A light curve for V626 Arae, plotted from Hipparcos data

Observation data Epoch J2000 Equinox ICRS
- Constellation: Ara
- Right ascension: 17^{h} 42^{m} 03.62014^{s}
- Declination: −50° 30′ 38.5331″
- Apparent magnitude (V): 6.23 - 6.46

Characteristics
- Spectral type: M3 III
- U−B color index: +1.96
- B−V color index: +1.73
- R−I color index: 0.85
- Variable type: LB

Astrometry
Radial velocity (R_{v})	−27.1±0.4 km/s
Proper motion (μ)	RA: +3.096 mas/yr Dec.: −15.788 mas/yr
Parallax (π)	3.4132±0.0864 mas
Distance	960 ± 20 ly (293 ± 7 pc)
Absolute magnitude (M_{V})	−0.45

Details
Mass	1.1 M_{☉}
Radius	95 R_{☉}
Luminosity	2,002 L_{☉}
Surface gravity (log g)	0.48 cgs
Temperature	3,479 K
Metallicity [Fe/H]	−0.05 dex

Other designations
- CD−50°11474, HD 160342, HIP 86628, HR 6576, SAO 244954, V626 Arae.

Database references
SIMBAD	data

HD 160342 is a star in the southern constellation of Ara. HD 160342 is its Henry Draper Catalogue designation. It has an apparent visual magnitude of 6.35, making it very faintly visible to the naked eye under ideal observing conditions. Based upon parallax measurements, is approximately 960 light-years (293 parsecs) distant from Earth.

In 1971, P. M. Corben announced that HD 160342 is a variable star, a discovery made using a telescope equipped with a photoelectric photometer at the Royal Observatory in South Africa. It was given its variable star designation, V626 Arae, in 1973.

With a stellar classification of M3 III, this is an evolved red giant that is on the asymptotic giant branch. It is a variable star that is classified as irregular, although changes in brightness of 0.1127 magnitudes at the rate of 0.37943 cycles per day (once every 2.6 days) have been detected in Hipparcos photometry.
