= Nu2 Arae =

Star in the constellation Ara

Nu^{2} Arae
- Location of ν^{2} Arae (circled)

Observation data Epoch J2000.0 Equinox J2000.0
- Constellation: Ara
- Right ascension: 17^{h} 51^{m} 11.045^{s}
- Declination: −53° 07′ 48.97″
- Apparent magnitude (V): 6.10

Characteristics
- Evolutionary stage: Main sequence
- Spectral type: B9.5 III-IV
- B−V color index: +0.010±0.004

Astrometry
Radial velocity (R_{v})	+18.8±1.2 km/s
Proper motion (μ)	RA: +14.823 mas/yr Dec.: +0.415 mas/yr
Parallax (π)	5.7871±0.0418 mas
Distance	564 ± 4 ly (173 ± 1 pc)
Absolute magnitude (M_{V})	+0.14

Details
Mass	2.4±0.3 M_{☉}
Radius	3.9±0.1 R_{☉}
Luminosity	117±9 L_{☉}
Surface gravity (log g)	3.64±0.06 cgs
Temperature	9,586±194 K

Other designations
- ν^{2} Arae, CD−53°7430, GC 24208, HD 161917, HIP 87379, HR 6632, SAO 245072, PPM 346364, TIC 397039557

Database references
SIMBAD	data

Nu^{2} Arae is a star in the southern constellation of Ara. Its name is a Bayer designation that is Latinized from ν^{2} Arae, and abbreviated Nu^{2} Ara or ν^{2} Ara. This star is faintly visible to the naked eye with an apparent visual magnitude of 6.10. Based on parallax measurements, it is located at a distance of approximately 564 light-years (173 parsecs) from the Earth. It is drifting further away from the Sun with a radial velocity of +19 km/s.

The stellar classification of B9.5 III-IV shows this to be a B-type star with a spectrum that displays features of both the subgiant and giant star stages. Stellar models predict this is a main sequence (dwarf) star with 2.4 times the mass of the Sun and 3.9 times the Sun's radius. It is radiating 117 times the luminosity of the Sun from its photosphere at an effective temperature of 9,586 K.

The star is sometimes referred as Upsilon^{2} Arae (υ^{2} Arae).
