= HD 154857 b =

Extrasolar planet orbiting HD 154857

Discovery
- Discovered by: McCarthy et al. AAT; Australia
- Discovery site: AAPS
- Discovery date: 2004
- Detection method: Radial velocity

Orbital characteristics
- Apastron: 1.8 AU (270,000,000 km)
- Periastron: 0.64 AU (96,000,000 km)
- Semi-major axis: 1.2 ± 0.2 AU (180,000,000 ± 30,000,000 km)
- Eccentricity: 0.47±0.02
- Orbital period (sidereal): 409±1 d 1.12 y
- Time of periastron: 2450346±5
- Argument of periastron: 59±4
- Semi-amplitude: 50.4±1
- Star: HD 154857

Physical characteristics
- Mass: >1.8±0.4 M_{J} (>570±100 M_{🜨})

HD 154857 b is an extrasolar planet approximately 224 light years away in the constellation of Ara. This is a gas giant mass that orbits the star in an eccentric orbit. This planet was detected by using Anglo-Australian Telescope (AAT) UCLE spectrometer.
