= R Arae =

Variable star in the constellation Ara

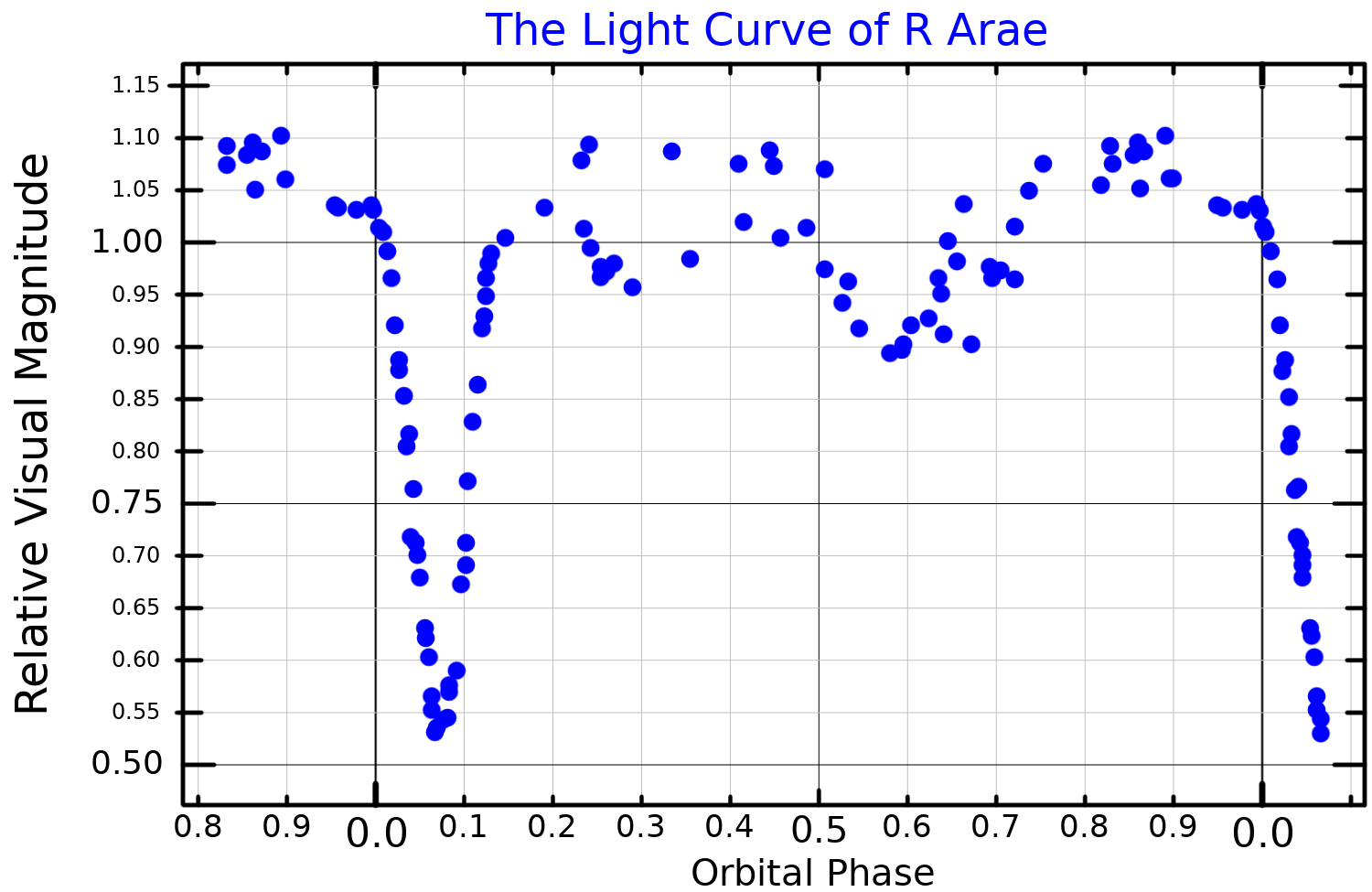
- A visual band light curve for R Arae, adapted from Blane et al. (2019)

Observation data Epoch J2000 Equinox ICRS
- Constellation: Ara
- Right ascension: 16^{h} 39^{m} 44.726^{s}
- Declination: −56° 59′ 39.92″
- Apparent magnitude (V): 6.17 (- 6.20) - 7.32

Characteristics
- Spectral type: B9Vp (B5V + F1IV)
- B−V color index: 0.10
- Variable type: Algol

Astrometry
Radial velocity (R_{v})	+5.5 km/s
Proper motion (μ)	RA: −4.991 mas/yr Dec.: −17.810 mas/yr
Parallax (π)	3.3603±0.0647 mas
Distance	970 ± 20 ly (298 ± 6 pc)
Absolute magnitude (M_{V})	−0.48 + 0.00

Orbit
Period (P)	4.425 d
Eccentricity (e)	0
Inclination (i)	78.0°
Semi-amplitude (K_{1}) (primary)	55.3 km/s
Semi-amplitude (K_{2}) (secondary)	181.6 km/s

Details

A
Mass	5.0 M_{☉}
Radius	3.41 R_{☉}
Luminosity	257 L_{☉}
Surface gravity (log g)	4.07 cgs
Temperature	12,500 K
Rotational velocity (v sin i)	202 km/s

B
Mass	1.5 M_{☉}
Radius	5.97 R_{☉}
Luminosity	78 L_{☉}
Surface gravity (log g)	3.07 cgs
Temperature	7,000 K
Rotational velocity (v sin i)	73 km/s

Other designations
- AAVSO 1631-56, CD−56°6482, HD 149730, HIP 81589, SAO 244037

Database references
SIMBAD	data

R Arae is an Algol-type eclipsing binary in the constellation Ara. Located approximately 298 parsecs (970 ly) distant, it normally shines at magnitude 6.17, but during eclipses can fall as low as magnitude 7.32. When an eclipse is not occurring, it will be faintly visible to the naked eye under ideal observing conditions.

In 1892, R Ara was discovered to be an eclipsing binary by Alexander William Roberts at Lovedale observatory in South Africa. The discovery was published in 1894. Roberts referred to the star as "(5949) Arae", its designation as an unconfirmed variable star in Seth Carlo Chandler's catalog of variable stars. It was listed with its modern variable star designation, R Arae, in Annie Jump Cannon's 1907 Second Catalogue of Variable Stars.

It has been suggested by multiple studies that mass transfer is occurring between the two stars of this system, and the period of eclipses seems to be increasing over time. The primary is a blue-white main sequence star of spectral type B5V that is 5 times as massive as the Sun, while the secondary is a yellow-white star of spectral type F1IV that is 1.5 times as massive as the Sun. Stellar material is being stripped off the secondary and accreting on the primary.

R Arae has an 8th-magnitude companion 3″ away. The companion star is at a similar distance.
