= Rho2 Arae =

Star in the constellation Ara

Rho^{2} Arae
- The location of ρ^{2} Arae (circled)

Observation data Epoch J2000 Equinox J2000
- Constellation: Ara
- Right ascension: 16^{h} 58^{m} 17.940^{s}
- Declination: −50° 38′ 28.27″
- Apparent magnitude (V): 5.54

Characteristics
- Spectral type: B9 IV or B9 V
- B−V color index: +0.02

Astrometry
Radial velocity (R_{v})	−44.0±4.3 km/s
Proper motion (μ)	RA: −9.758 mas/yr Dec.: −38.302 mas/yr
Parallax (π)	5.2105±0.0656 mas
Distance	626 ± 8 ly (192 ± 2 pc)
Absolute magnitude (M_{V})	−0.47

Details
Mass	3.42±0.10 M_{☉}
Radius	5.104 R_{☉}
Luminosity	238^{+34}_{−30} L_{☉}
Temperature	10,520±49 K
Rotational velocity (v sin i)	302 km/s

Other designations
- ρ^{2} Ara, CD50°10924, FK5 1444, GC 22841, HD 152824, HIP 83057, HR 6289, SAO 244313, PPM 345560

Database references
SIMBAD	data

Rho^{2} Arae is a star in the southern constellation of Ara. Its name is a Bayer designation that is Latinized from ρ^{2} Arae, and abbreviated Rho^{2} Ara or ρ^{2} Ara. It received this designation when the star was catalogued by Bode in his Uranographia. This is a rather dim naked eye star with an apparent visual magnitude of 5.54. Based upon an annual parallax shift of 6.28 mas, it is around 628 light-years (193 pc) distant from the Sun, give or take a 8-light-year margin of error. The star is drifting closer to the Sun with a radial velocity of −44 km/s.

The spectrum of this star matches a stellar classification of B9 IV or B9 V. The IV luminosity class suggests the star is in the subgiant stage, while a V class means it is a main-sequence star like the Sun. In the latter case, it is close to entering the subgiant stage at an estimated 93% of the way through its lifespan on the main sequence.

Rho^{2} Arae has more than three times the mass of the Sun and 5.1 times the Sun's radius. It is radiating 238 times the Sun's luminosity from the star's photosphere at an effective temperature of 10,520 K, giving it the blue-white hue of a B-type star. The star is spinning rapidly with a projected rotational velocity of 302 km/s.
