= Ara in Chinese astronomy =

According to traditional Chinese uranography, the modern constellation Ara is located within the eastern quadrant of the sky, which is symbolized as the Azure Dragon of the East (東方青龍, Dōng Fāng Qīng Lóng).

The name of the western constellation in modern Chinese is 天壇座 (tiān tán zuò), meaning "the heaven altar constellation".

== Stars ==
The map of Chinese constellation in constellation Ara area consists of :

Four Symbols	Mansion (Chinese name)	Romanization	Translation	Asterisms (Chinese name)	Romanization	Translation	Western star name	Chinese star name	Romanization	Translation
Azure Dragon of the East (東方青龍)	尾	Wěi	Tail	龜	Guī	Tortoise				
Azure Dragon of the East (東方青龍)	尾	Wěi	Tail	龜	Guī	Tortoise	ε^{1} Ara	龜一	Guīyī	1st star
Azure Dragon of the East (東方青龍)	尾	Wěi	Tail	龜	Guī	Tortoise	γ Ara	龜二	Guīèr	2nd star
Azure Dragon of the East (東方青龍)	尾	Wěi	Tail	龜	Guī	Tortoise	δ Ara	龜三	Guīsān	3rd star
Azure Dragon of the East (東方青龍)	尾	Wěi	Tail	龜	Guī	Tortoise	η Ara	龜四	Guīsì	4th star
Azure Dragon of the East (東方青龍)	尾	Wěi	Tail	龜	Guī	Tortoise	ζ Ara	龜五	Guīwǔ	5th star
Azure Dragon of the East (東方青龍)	箕	Jī	Winnowing Basket	杵	Chǔ	Pestle				
Azure Dragon of the East (東方青龍)	箕	Jī	Winnowing Basket	杵	Chǔ	Pestle	σ Ara	杵一	Chǔyī	1st star
Azure Dragon of the East (東方青龍)	箕	Jī	Winnowing Basket	杵	Chǔ	Pestle	α Ara	杵二	Chǔèr	2nd star
Azure Dragon of the East (東方青龍)	箕	Jī	Winnowing Basket	杵	Chǔ	Pestle	β Ara	杵三	Chǔsān	3rd star
Azure Dragon of the East (東方青龍)	箕	Jī	Winnowing Basket	杵	Chǔ	Pestle	θ Ara	杵增一	Chǔzēngyī	1st additional star

== See also ==
- Chinese astronomy
- Traditional Chinese star names
- Chinese constellations
