= Epsilon Arae =

The Bayer designation Epsilon Arae (ε Ara / ε Arae) is shared by two star systems, both in the constellation Ara:

- ε^{1} Arae
- ε^{2} Arae

They are separated by 0.54° on the sky.
