= Zeta Arae =

Star in the constellation Ara

ζ Arae
- Location of ζ Arae (circled)

Observation data Epoch J2000 Equinox ICRS
- Constellation: Ara
- Right ascension: 16^{h} 58^{m} 37.213^{s}
- Declination: −55° 59′ 24.50″
- Apparent magnitude (V): 3.13

Characteristics
- Evolutionary stage: AGB
- Spectral type: K3 III
- U−B color index: +1.96
- B−V color index: +1.60

Astrometry
Radial velocity (R_{v})	−6.0±0.6 km/s
Proper motion (μ)	RA: −17.518 mas/yr Dec.: −36.120 mas/yr
Parallax (π)	5.7725±0.1727 mas
Distance	570 ± 20 ly (173 ± 5 pc)
Absolute magnitude (M_{V})	−3.95

Details
Mass	7–8 M_{☉}
Radius	114±4 R_{☉}
Luminosity	3,800^{+464}_{−414} L_{☉}
Surface gravity (log g)	1.200±0.004 cgs
Temperature	4,246^{+99}_{−96} K
Metallicity [Fe/H]	−0.40 dex

Other designations
- Tseen Yin, ζ Arae, CPD−55°7766, FK5 631, GC 22845, GJ 9581, HD 152786, HIP 83081, HR 6285, SAO 244315, PPM 345563

Database references
SIMBAD	data
ARICNS	data

Zeta Arae is the third-brightest star in the southern constellation Ara. Its name is a Bayer designation that is Latinized from ζ Arae, and abbreviated Zeta Ara or ζ Ara. The apparent visual magnitude of this star is 3.1, which can be seen with the naked eye from suburban skies in the southern hemisphere. From the parallax measurements, it is located at a distance of approximately 490 light-years (150 parsecs) from Earth. The star is drifting closer to the Sun with a radial velocity of 6 km/s.

The spectrum of this star matches a stellar classification of K3 III. The luminosity class of 'III' indicates this is a giant star that has exhausted the hydrogen at its core and evolved away from the main sequence. However, some studies have suggested it is instead a supergiant. The star has 7-8 times the mass of the Sun and has expanded to 114 times the Sun's girth. It is radiating 3,800 times the luminosity of the Sun from its photosphere at an effective temperature of 4,246 K, giving it the orange hue of a K-type star.

In 1997, an excess of infrared emission was announced that may indicate circumstellar matter. However, a 2015 study found no excess. A candidate gravitationally bound companion was announced in 2022. This object lies at an angular separation of 138.4″ from Zeta Arae, which is equivalent to a projected separation of 20.63×10^{3} au.

== Nomenclature ==
In Chinese, 龜 (Guī), meaning Tortoise, refers to an asterism consisting of ζ Arae, ε^{1} Arae, γ Arae, δ Arae and η Arae. Consequently, the Chinese name for ζ Arae itself is 龜五 (Guī wǔ, English: the Fifth Star of Tortoise.)

R. H. Allen called it Tseen Yin /ˌsiːnˈjɪn/, together with δ Arae, from the Chinese 天陰 (Mandarin pronunciation tiānyīn) "dark sky". However, 天陰 is in Aries. so Allen probably confused constellation "Ara" with "Ari".
