= Alpha Arae =

Star in the constellation Ara

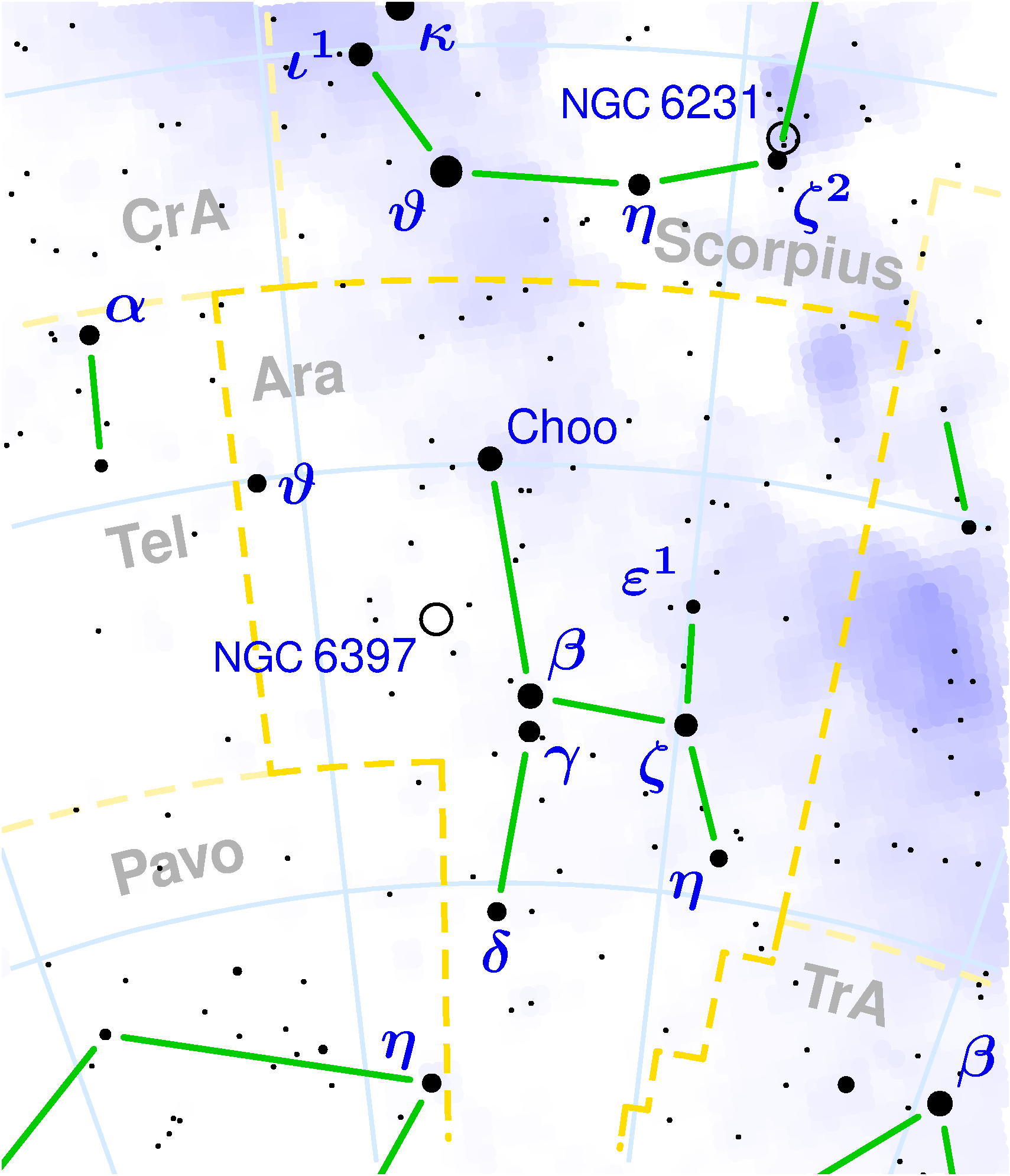
- α Arae (Choo) in the constellation Ara.

Observation data Epoch J2000.0 Equinox J2000.0 (ICRS)
- Constellation: Ara
- Right ascension: 17^{h} 31^{m} 50.49153^{s}
- Declination: −49° 52′ 34.1220″
- Apparent magnitude (V): 2.93 (2.76 to 2.90)

Characteristics
- Spectral type: B2 Vne
- U−B color index: −0.72
- B−V color index: −0.16
- R−I color index: −0.24
- Variable type: BE

Astrometry
Radial velocity (R_{v})	0 km/s
Proper motion (μ)	RA: −33.27 mas/yr Dec.: −67.22 mas/yr
Parallax (π)	12.20±0.85 mas
Distance	270 ± 20 ly (82 ± 6 pc)
Absolute magnitude (M_{V})	−1.72

Details
Mass	9.6 M_{☉}
Radius	4.5 R_{☉}
Luminosity (bolometric)	5,800 L_{☉}
Surface gravity (log g)	3.99 cgs
Temperature	18,044 K
Rotational velocity (v sin i)	375 km/s

Other designations
- Choo, α Arae, α Ara, NSV 8999, CD−49°11511, FK5 651, GC 23708, HD 158427, HIP 85792, HR 6510, SAO 228069, PPM 323069, WDS J17318-4953A

Database references
SIMBAD	data

Alpha Arae, is the second brightest star in the southern constellation of Ara. Its name is a Bayer designation that is Latinized from α Arae, and abbreviated Alpha Ara or α Ara. With an average apparent visual magnitude 2.93, it is readily visible to the naked eye from the southern hemisphere. This star is close enough to the Earth that its distance can be estimated using parallax data collected during the Hipparcos mission. It is around 270 light-years (83 parsecs) away, with a 7% margin of error. The visual magnitude of the star is diminished by 0.10 magnitudes as a result of extinction from intervening gas and dust.

== Properties ==
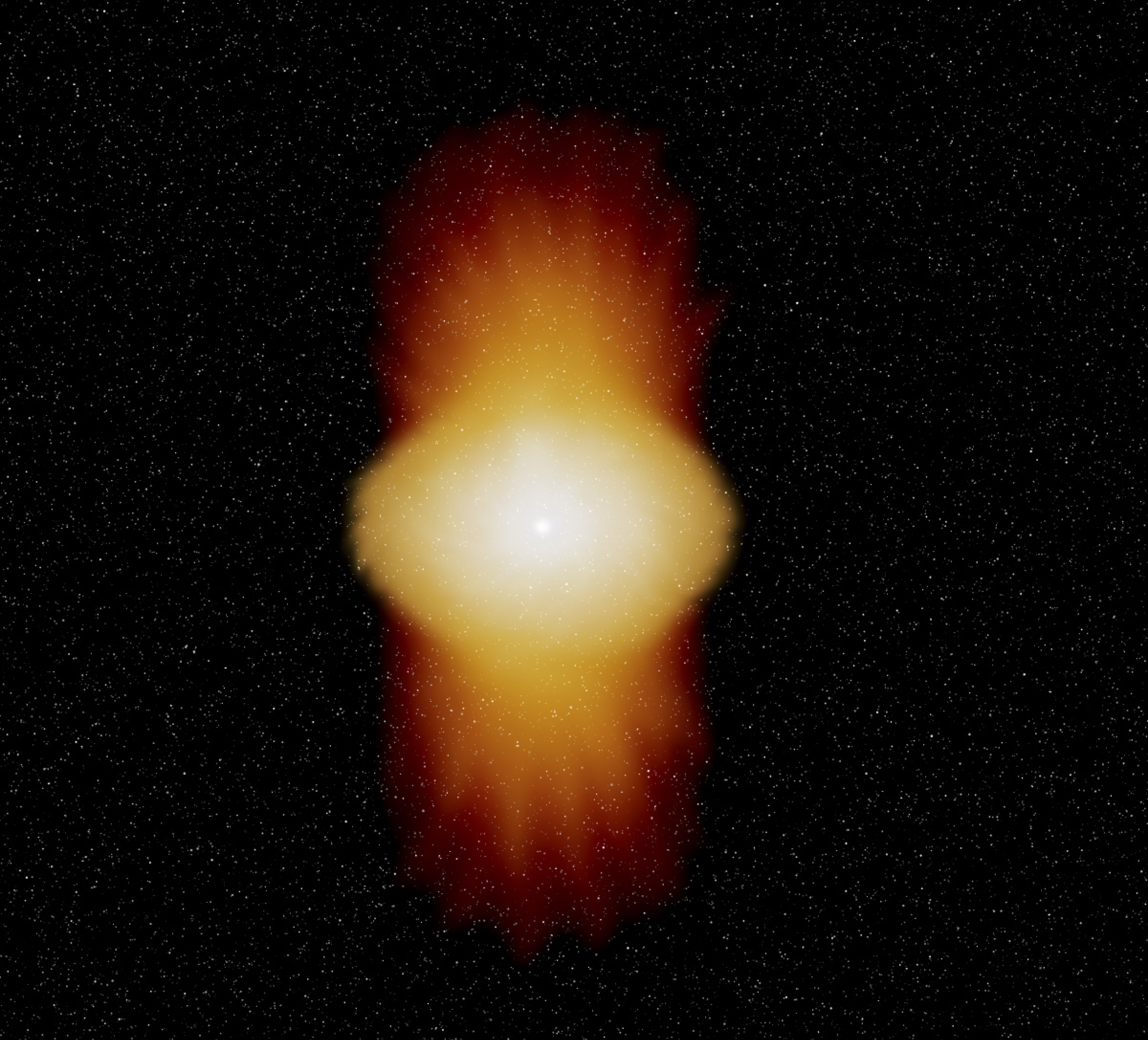
Artistic impression of the disk around Alpha Arae

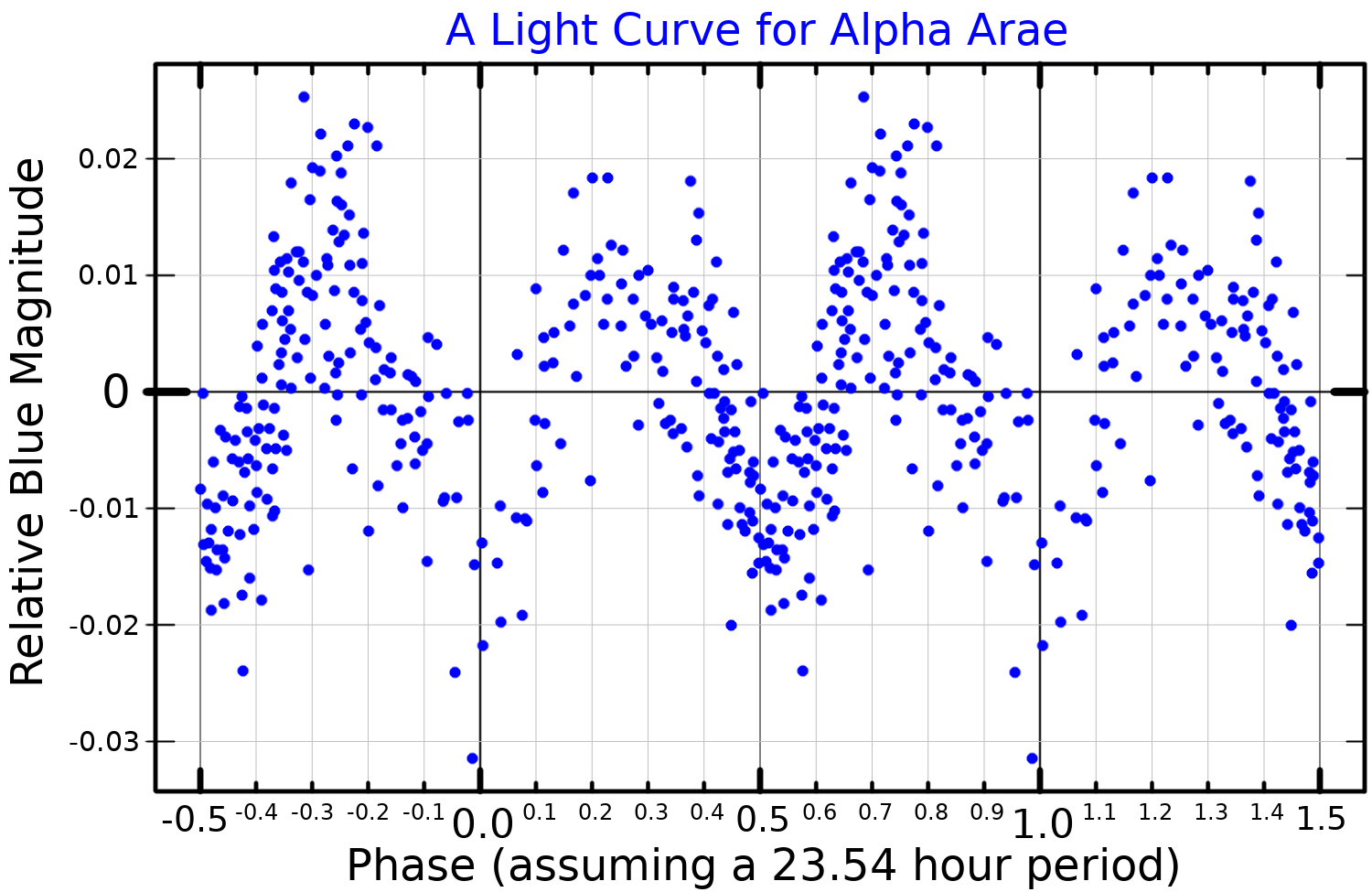
A blue-light light curve for Alpha Arae, adapted from Cuypers et al. (1989)

Alpha Arae has a stellar classification of B2 Vne, indicating that it is a massive B-type main sequence star. The 'n' notation in the suffix indicates that the absorption lines in the star's spectrum appear spread out and nebulous because of the Doppler effect from rapid rotation. The measured projected rotational velocity has been measured as high as 375 km s^{−1}. Meilland et al. (2007) estimate the pole of the star is inclined by 55° to the line of sight, yielding an equatorial azimuthal velocity of 470 km s^{−1}. This is close to the critical velocity where the star would start to break up. The rapid rotation is causing a pronounced equatorial bulge of about 2.4–2.7 times the polar radius.

It is a Be star, as indicated by the 'e' notation in the star's classification. This indicates that emission lines are observed in the spectrum, which is coming from a disk of material ejected from the star because of its rapid rotation. In 2003 and 2005, Alpha Arae was observed by infrared interferometry, using the MIDI and AMBER instruments at the VLT Interferometer. The results, published in 2005 and 2007, appear to show that Alpha Arae is surrounded by a dense equatorial disk of material in Keplerian (rather than uniform) rotation, and that it is losing mass by a polar stellar wind with a terminal velocity of approximately 1,000 km/s. There is also some evidence that Alpha Arae is orbited by a companion at 0.7 AU.

This star is around 9.6 times as massive as the Sun, and has an average of 4.5 times its radius. It is 5,800 times as luminous as the Sun, its energy emitted from its outer envelope at an effective temperature of 18,044 K. This heat gives Alpha Arae the blue-white hue that is characteristic of B-type stars. It is a variable star with a magnitude that varies between 2.76^{m} and 2.90^{m}. The General Catalogue of Variable Stars classifies it only as BE, indicating that it is a variable Be star but not obviously a Gamma Cassiopeiae variable. The International Variable Star Index defines it as GCAS + LERI, showing both rapid periodic variation and slow irregular eruptions.

Alpha Arae has a visual companion star, CCDM J17318-4953B, located approximately 50 arcseconds away along a position angle of 168°, with an apparent visual magnitude of about 11. The two stars appear close to each other by coincidence and are not physically close in space.

== In culture ==
With β and σ Ara it forms the Chinese asterism Choo (pinyin: chǔ, 杵), "pestle" in traditional Chinese astronomy. It was the second star of Choo (杵二), but R. H. Allen used the name Choo for this star only. Patrick Moore lists Choo as a proper name for this star in his star catalogue of the constellation Ara. This name is also given the French spelling Tchou. There is another Choo in the constellation Pegasus.

In Chinese, 杵 (Chǔ), meaning Pestle, refers to an asterism consisting of α Arae, σ Arae and β Arae. Consequently, the Chinese name for α Arae itself is 杵二 (Chǔ èr, English: the Second Star of Pestle).

== See also ==
- Traditional Chinese star names in Ara
- Traditional Chinese star names in Pegasus
