= Gliese 674 b =

Mini-Neptune orbiting Gliese 674

Discovery
- Discovered by: Bonfils et al.
- Discovery site: ESO
- Discovery date: January 7, 2007
- Detection method: HARPS

Orbital characteristics
- Semi-major axis: 0.03867087(15) AU
- Eccentricity: 0.242+0.012 −0.013
- Orbital period (sidereal): 4.69502±0.00003 d
- Time of periastron: 2453160.26±0.04
- Argument of periastron: 138.1°±2.9°
- Semi-amplitude: 8.68+0.11 −0.12 m/s
- Star: Gliese 674

Physical characteristics
- Mass: ≥10.95±0.14 M_{🜨}

Gliese 674 b is an extrasolar planet approximately 15 light years away in the constellation of Ara. This planet orbits tightly around Gliese 674. It is a sub-Neptune-or-Uranus-mass planet either gaseous or rocky. It orbits as close as 0.039 AU from the star and takes only 4.6938 days to orbit. This planet has a similar eccentricity to Mercury (e=0.2). The discovery of the planet was announced on January 7, 2007 by using the HARPS spectrograph mounted on the ESO's 3.6 meter telescope at La Silla, Chile.
