= NGC 6328 =

Galaxy in the constellation Ara

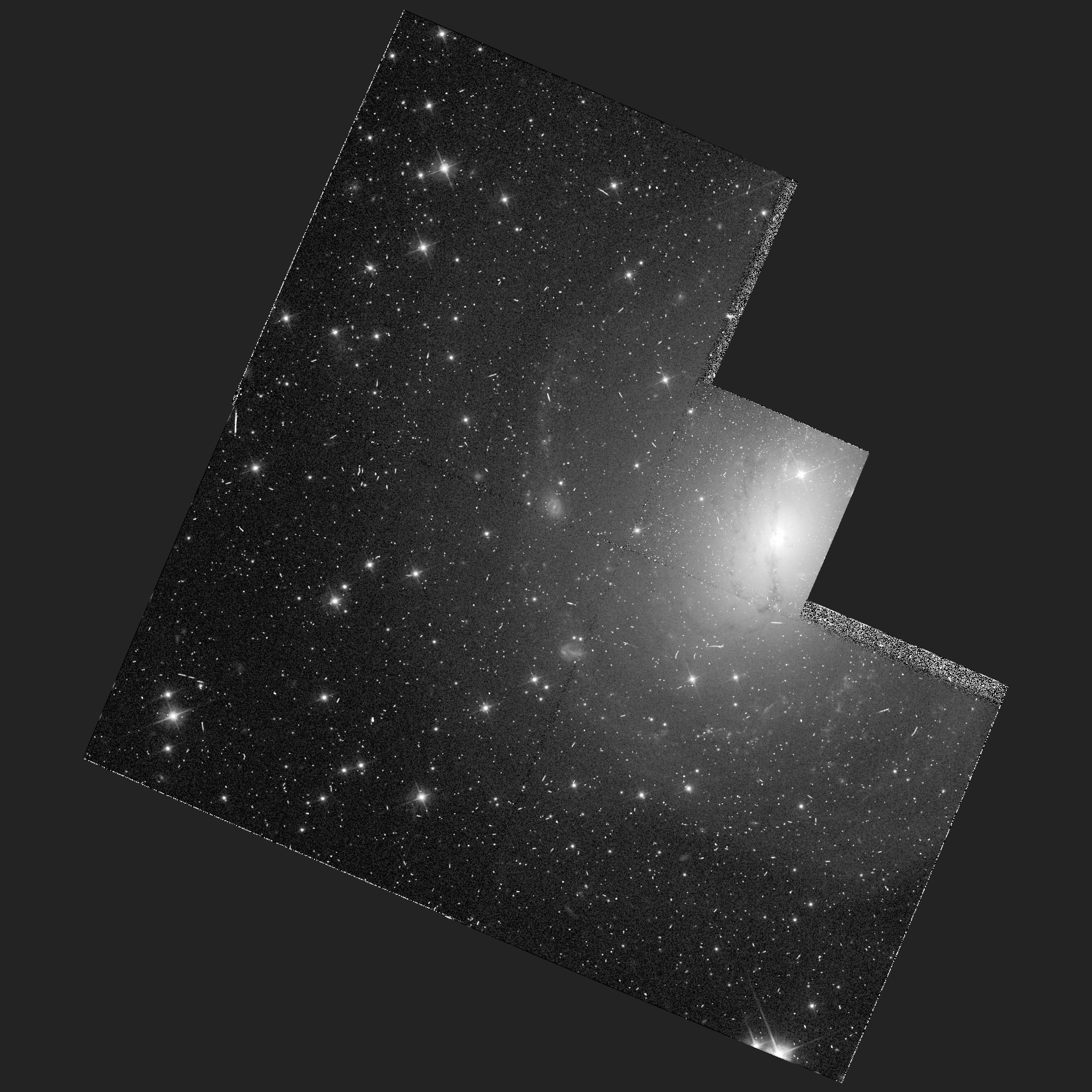
- NGC 6328 as seen through the Hubble Space Telescope

Observation data (J2000 epoch)
- Constellation: Ara
- Right ascension: 17^{h} 23^{m} 41.0^{s}
- Declination: −65° 00′ 37″
- Redshift: 0.014428±0.000023
- Heliocentric radial velocity: 4325±7 km/s
- Galactocentric velocity: 4209±8 km/s
- Distance: 198.6 million light years (60.9 million parsecs)
- Apparent magnitude (V): 12.4

Characteristics
- Type: SAB(s)ab
- Size: 139,000 light years
- Apparent size (V): 2.40′ × 1.4′

Other designations
- ESO 102-3, AM 1718-645 and PGC 60198
- References: NASA/IPAC extragalactic database, http://spider.seds.org/

NGC 6328 is an intermediate spiral galaxy located in the constellation Ara. It is classified as SAB(s)ab in the galaxy morphological classification scheme and was discovered by the British astronomer John Herschel on 2 May 1835. NGC 6328 is located at about 199 million light years away from Earth.

== See also ==
- List of NGC objects (6001–7000)
- List of NGC objects
