= Epsilon2 Arae =

Star in the constellation Ara

Epsilon^{2} Arae
- The location of ε^{2} Arae (circled)

Observation data Epoch J2000 Equinox ICRS
- Constellation: Ara
- Right ascension: 17^{h} 03^{m} 08.754^{s}
- Declination: −53° 14′ 12.97″
- Apparent magnitude (V): 5.270 (5.44 + 8.65)

Characteristics
- Spectral type: F5 V Fe+0.5 + DA3.2
- U−B color index: +0.015
- B−V color index: +0.498±0.005

Astrometry
Radial velocity (R_{v})	+4.9 km/s
Proper motion (μ)	RA: −22.409 mas/yr Dec.: −143.793 mas/yr
Parallax (π)	37.3696±0.1347 mas
Distance	87.3 ± 0.3 ly (26.76 ± 0.10 pc)
Absolute magnitude (M_{V})	3.27

Orbit
Primary	ε^{2} Ara Aa
Name	ε^{2} Ara Ab
Period (P)	41.3 yr
Semi-major axis (a)	0.589″
Eccentricity (e)	0.622
Inclination (i)	133.8°
Longitude of the node (Ω)	73.6°

Details

ε^{2} Ara Aa
Mass	1.40^{+0.01}_{−0.02} M_{☉}
Radius	1.8 R_{☉}
Luminosity	4.56 L_{☉}
Surface gravity (log g)	4.29 cgs
Temperature	6,577 K
Metallicity [Fe/H]	+0.02 dex
Rotational velocity (v sin i)	45.4 km/s
Age	1.77^{+0.29}_{−0.26} Gyr

ε^{2} Ara C
Mass	0.66±0.07 M_{☉}
Radius	0.0124±0.0003 R_{☉}
Surface gravity (log g)	8.07±0.04 cgs
Temperature	15,507±230 K

Other designations
- CPD−53°8316, GC 22956, GJ 3985, HD 153580, HIP 83431, HR 6314, SAO 244388, PPM 345633, WDS J17031-5314A

Database references
SIMBAD	data

Epsilon^{2} Arae is a double star in the southern constellation of Ara. Its name is a Bayer designation that is Latinized from ε^{2} Arae, and abbreviated Epsilon^{2} Ara or ε^{2} Ara. Based on parallax measurements, it is 89 light-years (27 parsecs) distant from Earth. With a combined apparent visual magnitude of 5.27, this system is faintly visible to the naked eye as a point of light.

The brighter star is a magnitude 5.44 F-type main sequence star with a stellar classification of F5 V Fe+0.5. The Fe+0.5 notation indicates that it has a somewhat higher than normal abundance of iron. It has an estimated age of 1.8 billion years and a relatively high rate of rotation with a projected rotational velocity of 45 km/s. This star has 1.4 times the mass of the Sun and 1.8 times the Sun's radius. It is radiating 4.56 times the luminosity of the Sun from its photosphere at an effective temperature of 6,577 K. The metallicity of the star, a measure of the abundance of more massive elements, is similar to the Sun. It is a candidate pulsating star.

There is a magnitude 8.65 stellar companion, component Ab, at an angular separation of 0.590 arcseconds. The pair have an estimated orbital period of 41.3 years. A common proper motion white dwarf companion, WD 1659-53, lies at an angular separation of 113.76″. Designated component C, it is magnitude 13.47 with a classification of DA3.2.
