= NGC 6362 =

Globular cluster in the constellation Ara

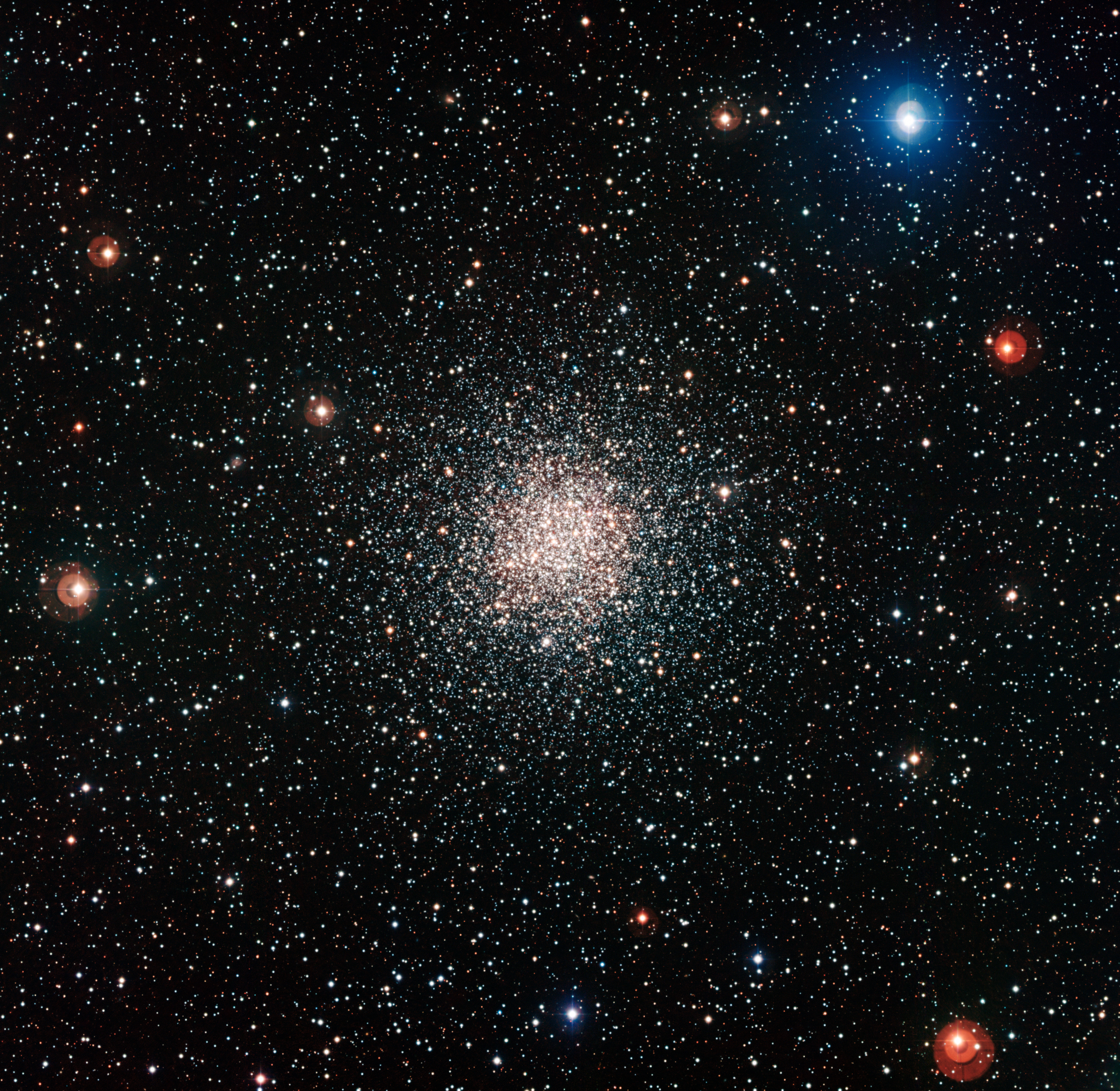
- NGC 6362

Observation data (J2000 epoch)
- Class: X
- Constellation: Ara
- Right ascension: 17^{h} 31^{m} 54.99^{s}
- Declination: –67° 02′ 54.0″
- Distance: 24.8 kly (7.6 kpc)
- Apparent magnitude (V): +8.3
- Apparent dimensions (V): 9'

Physical characteristics
- Metallicity: [Fe/H] = –0.99 dex
- Estimated age: 13.57 Gyr
- Other designations: GCl 66, C 1726-670

NGC 6362 is a globular cluster in the constellation Ara, lying close to Apus in the southern sky. A telescope with a 150mm primary mirror is required to resolve the stars within this irregularly shaped cluster. British astronomer James Dunlop first observed the cluster on 30 June 1826. It is located about 25,000 light-years from Earth and contains a number of blue stragglers.

== Gallery ==
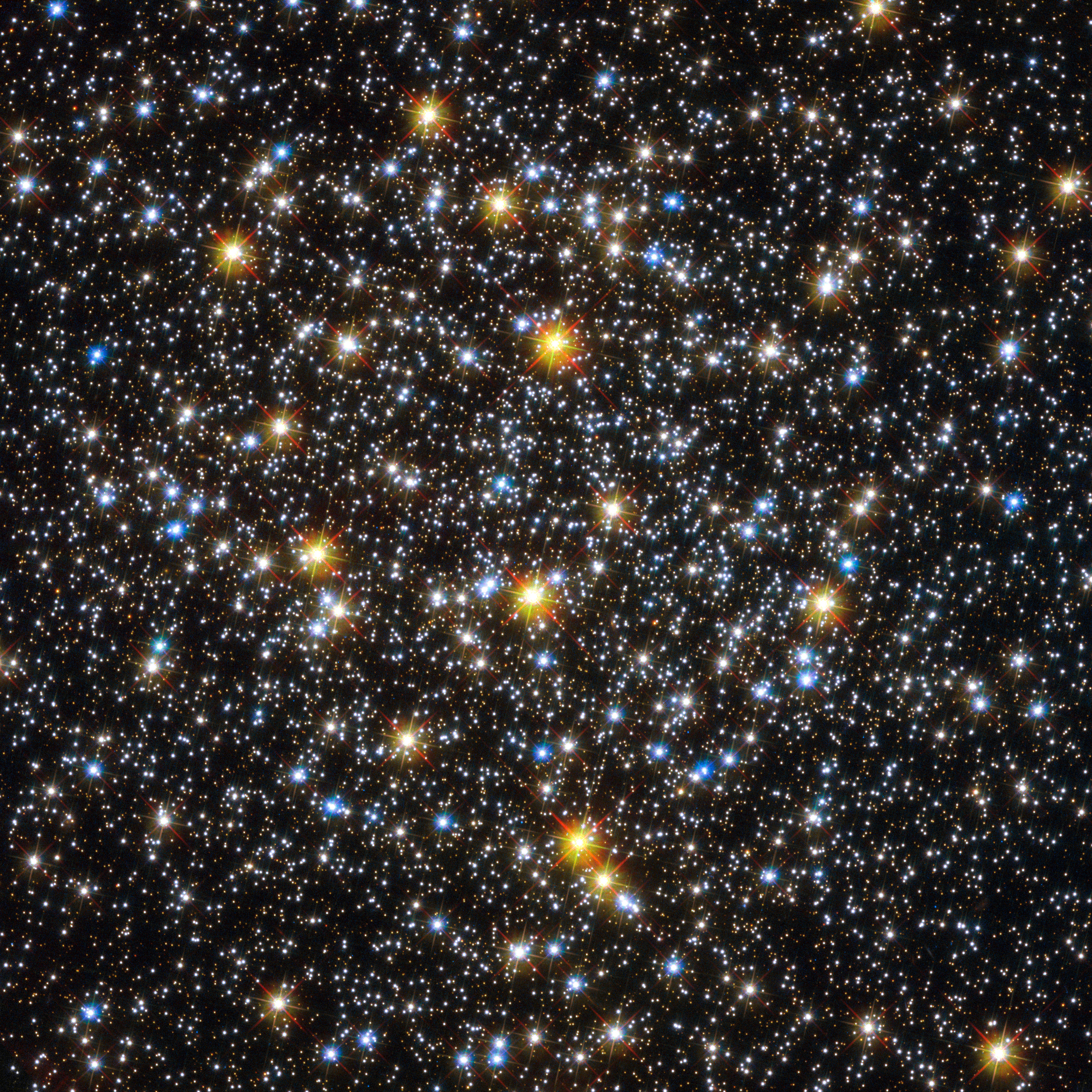
Detailed view of NGC 6362 globular cluster.
