= Gliese 674 =

Star in the constellation Ara

- Location of Gliese 674 in the constellation Ara

Observation data Epoch J2000 Equinox ICRS
- Constellation: Ara
- Right ascension: 17^{h} 28^{m} 39.94558^{s}
- Declination: –46° 53′ 42.6881″
- Apparent magnitude (V): 9.38

Characteristics
- Evolutionary stage: main sequence
- Spectral type: M3V
- U−B color index: 1.20
- B−V color index: 1.553±0.017
- R−I color index: 1.33

Astrometry
Radial velocity (R_{v})	−2.904±0.0004 km/s
Proper motion (μ)	RA: 572.568(40) mas/yr Dec.: −880.583(27) mas/yr
Parallax (π)	219.6463±0.0262 mas
Distance	14.849 ± 0.002 ly (4.5528 ± 0.0005 pc)
Absolute magnitude (M_{V})	11.09

Details
Mass	0.353±0.008 M_{☉}
Radius	0.361+0.012 −0.011 R_{☉}
Luminosity	0.01575±0.00037 L_{☉}
Temperature	3,404+59 −57 K
Metallicity [Fe/H]	−0.30±0.08 dex
Rotation	32.9±0.1 d
Rotational velocity (v sin i)	3.2±1.2 km/s
Age	0.1–1.0 Gyr

Other designations
- CD−46°11540, GJ 674, HIP 85523, LFT 1351, LHS 449, LPM 645, LTT 6942

Database references
SIMBAD	The star
- b
Exoplanet Archive	data
ARICNS	data

Gliese 674 (GJ 674) is a red dwarf star with an exoplanetary companion in the southern constellation of Ara. It is too faint to be visible to the naked eye, having an apparent visual magnitude of 9.38 and an absolute magnitude of 11.09. The system is located at a distance of 14.85 light-years from the Sun based on parallax measurements, but is drifting closer with a radial velocity of −2.9 km/s. It is a candidate member of the 200 million year old Castor stream of co-moving stars.

== Description ==
GJ 674 is a low-mass M-type main-sequence star with a stellar classification of M3V. The star is weakly active and show star spots on a regular basis. Even low activity red dwarfs can flare, and in 2018 this star was observed emitting a hot ultraviolet flare with a total energy of 5.6×10^{23} Joules and a duration of a few hours. GJ 674 is at an intermediate stage of spin-down with a rotation period of 33.4 days, suggesting an age of up to a few billion years. It is smaller and less massive than the Sun, and is radiating just 1.6% of the Sun's luminosity from its photosphere at an effective temperature of 3,404 K.

== Planetary system ==
On January 7, 2007, Bonfils et al. used the HARPS spectrograph in ESO and found an intermediate mass planet orbiting close to the red dwarf star in an eccentric orbit. This system is a promising candidate for detecting radio emission caused by interaction between the planet and the stellar wind. No additional planets were found as of 2024.

The Gliese 674 planetary system
Companion (in order from star)	Mass	Semimajor axis (AU)	Orbital period (days)	Eccentricity	Inclination (°)	Radius
b	≥10.95±0.14 M_{🜨}	0.03867087(15)	4.69502±0.00003	0.242+0.012 −0.013	—	—

== See also ==
- List of nearest stars and brown dwarfs
- Lists of exoplanets
