= Delta Arae =

Star in the constellation Ara

- δ Arae (circled) in the Ara Constellation

Observation data Epoch J2000 Equinox ICRS
- Constellation: Ara
- Right ascension: 17^{h} 31^{m} 05.91272^{s}
- Declination: −60° 41′ 01.8522″
- Apparent magnitude (V): 3.62

Characteristics
- Spectral type: B8 Vn + G8 V
- U−B color index: −0.31
- B−V color index: −0.10

Astrometry
Radial velocity (R_{v})	+10 km/s
Proper motion (μ)	RA: −54.01 mas/yr Dec.: −99.25 mas/yr
Parallax (π)	16.48±0.34 mas
Distance	198 ± 4 ly (61 ± 1 pc)
Absolute magnitude (M_{V})	−0.31

Orbit
Primary	A
Name	B
Period (P)	2.46697±0.00500 yr
Semi-major axis (a)	48.7±0.2 mas
Eccentricity (e)	0.7380±0.0264
Inclination (i)	90.32±0.97°
Longitude of the node (Ω)	127.13±0.91°
Argument of periastron (ω) (secondary)	347.80±1.05°

Details

δ Ara A
Mass	3.56 M_{☉}
Radius	3.12±0.15 R_{☉}
Luminosity	214 L_{☉}
Surface gravity (log g)	3.81±0.06 cgs
Temperature	13,882 K
Rotational velocity (v sin i)	255 km/s
Age	125 Myr

δ Ara B
Temperature	4,129 K

Other designations
- δ Ara, CPD−60°6842, FK5 648, GC 23681, HD 158094, HIP 85727, HR 6500, SAO 253945, PPM 362756, WDS J17311-6041A

Database references
SIMBAD	data

Delta Arae is a binary star in the southern constellation Ara. Its name is a Bayer designation that is Latinized from δ Arae, and abbreviated Delta Ara or δ Ara. This system has an apparent visual magnitude of 3.62 and is visible to the naked eye as a point of light. Based upon an annual parallax of 16.48 mas, it is about 198 light-years (61 parsecs) distant from the Earth.

== Characteristics ==
This is an astrometric binary system, identified using data from the Gaia spacecraft. The components have an orbital period of about 2.47 years and a high orbital eccentricity of 0.7380. The orbit is nearly edge-on relative to Earth.

The brighter component is an intermediate-mass B-type main sequence star with a stellar classification of B8 Vn. The 'n' suffix indicates the absorption lines are spread out broadly because the star is spinning rapidly. It has a projected rotational velocity of 255 km/s, resulting in an equatorial bulge with a radius 13% larger than the polar radius. The star has 3.56 times the mass and 3.1 times the radius of the Sun. It is radiating 214 times the luminosity of the Sun from its photosphere at an effective temperature of 13,882 K.

The secondary is 1.27 times fainter than the primary at Gaia's G-band, it has 2.03 times the mass of the Sun and an effective temperature of 9,161 K.

There is a magnitude 9.5 companion G-type main sequence star that may (17% chance) form a gravitationally bound system with Delta Arae. A 12th magnitude optical companion is located 47.4 arcseconds away along a position angle of 313°.

== Etymology ==
Delta Arae was known as 龜三 (meaning: "the 3rd (star) of Guī") in traditional Chinese astronomy.

Allen erroneously called both Delta and Zeta Arae "Tseen Yin" (天陰). He probably confused the constellation "Ara" with "Ari", as 天陰 is actually in Aries.

== See also ==
- Ara (Chinese astronomy)
- Aries (Chinese astronomy)
