= Beta Arae =

Star in the constellation Ara

β Arae
- Location of β Arae (circled)

Observation data Epoch J2000 Equinox ICRS
- Constellation: Ara
- Right ascension: 17^{h} 25^{m} 17.989^{s}
- Declination: −55° 31′ 47.57″
- Apparent magnitude (V): 2.84

Characteristics
- Evolutionary stage: Red supergiant
- Spectral type: K0/1Ib
- U−B color index: +1.56
- B−V color index: +1.46

Astrometry
Radial velocity (R_{v})	−0.3±0.2 km/s
Proper motion (μ)	RA: −8.51 mas/yr Dec.: −25.24 mas/yr
Parallax (π)	4.5601±0.2077 mas
Distance	714+39 −34 ly (218.8+12.0 −10.4 pc)
Absolute magnitude (M_{V})	−3.494

Details
Mass	5.89±0.07 or 7.89±0.4 M_{☉}
Radius	141.4±6.6 R_{☉}
Luminosity	5,774±535 L_{☉}
Surface gravity (log g)	0.97±0.06 cgs
Temperature	4,232±17 K
Metallicity [Fe/H]	0.5±0.1 dex
Rotational velocity (v sin i)	5.4±1.0 km/s
Age	50.1±4.4 Myr

Other designations
- CPD−55°8100, FK5 645, GC 23515, HD 157244, HIP 85258, HR 6461, SAO 244725, PPM 345989

Database references
SIMBAD	data

Beta Arae is the brightest star in the constellation of Ara. This is a very luminous, relatively young red supergiant with an apparent visual magnitude of 2.84 and an absolute magnitude of −3.494. Its name is a Bayer designation that is Latinized from β Arae, and abbreviated Beta Ara or β Ara. Based on a photogeometric estimation method, it is 710 light-years away, a distance of which interstellar extinction in the line of sight reduces its apparent magnitude by 0.193 magnitudes.

== Characteristics ==
The spectrum of this star matches a stellar classification of K0/1 Ib, with the luminosity class notation 'Ib' indicating that the star is a supergiant. It has an age estimated at 50 million years, having spent much of its life as a B-type star. Currently, it has expanded to 141 times the Sun's size and is 5,800 times more luminous. Beta Arae is radiating energy from its outer envelope at an effective temperature of 4,200 K, which causes it to take on the orange hue of a K-type star. This enlarged star appears to be rotating slowly with a projected rotational velocity of about 5 km/s. The abundance of elements other than hydrogen and helium, its metallicity, is more than three times that of the Sun. (Note: The abundance is estimated by taking [Fe/H] to the power of ten: 10^{[Fe/H]} = 10^{+0.5} = 3.1)

== Nomenclature ==
Beta Arae is the star's Bayer designation. Other designations include HD 157244 (from the Henry Draper Catalogue), HIP 85258 (from the Hipparcos catalogue) and HR 6461 (from the Bright Star Catalogue).

In Turkish, this star is rarely called Vasat-ül-cemre, from Arabic وسط الجمر (wasaṭ al-jamar) meaning "middle of the embers." The constellation Ara is named in Arabic المجمرة (al-mijmarah), meaning brazier/incense-burner. In Chinese, 杵 (Chǔ), meaning Pestle, refers to an asterism of β, σ and α Arae. The Chinese name for β Arae is 杵三 (Chǔ sān, English: the Third Star of Pestle.)
