= NGC 6208 =

Open star cluster in the constellation Ara

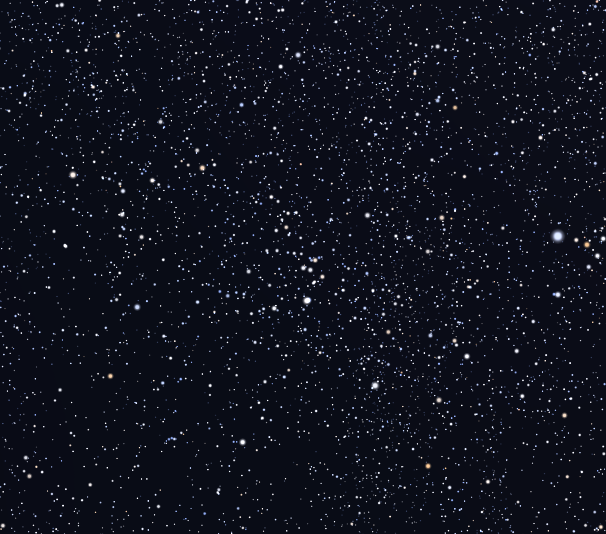
- NGC 6208 (taken from Stellarium)

Observation data (J2000 epoch)
- Right ascension: 16^{h} 49^{m} 28.(0)^{s}
- Declination: −53° 43′ 4(2)″
- Distance: 3,060 ly (939 pc)
- Apparent magnitude (V): 7.2
- Apparent dimensions (V): 18′

Physical characteristics
- Estimated age: 1.17 Gyr
- Other designations: C1645-537, Collinder 313, VDBH 198

Associations
- Constellation: Ara

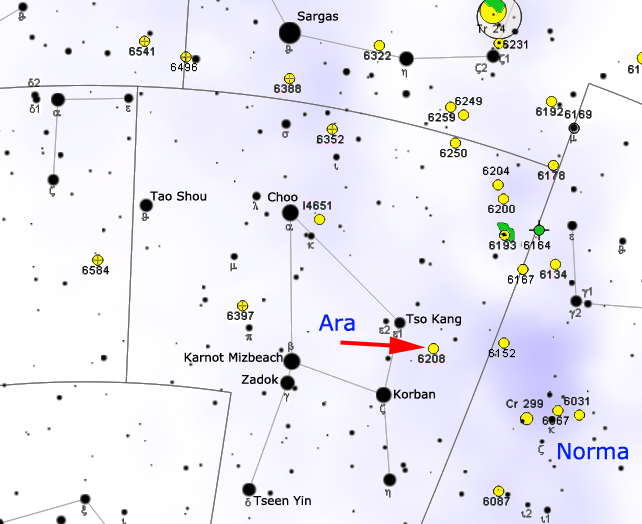
Map showing the location of NGC 6208

NGC 6208 is an open cluster in the southern constellation of Ara. With an age of 1.17 Gigayears, it is one of the oldest known open clusters.
