= IC 1266 =

Planetary nebula in the constellation Ara

Nebula
- Planetary nebula
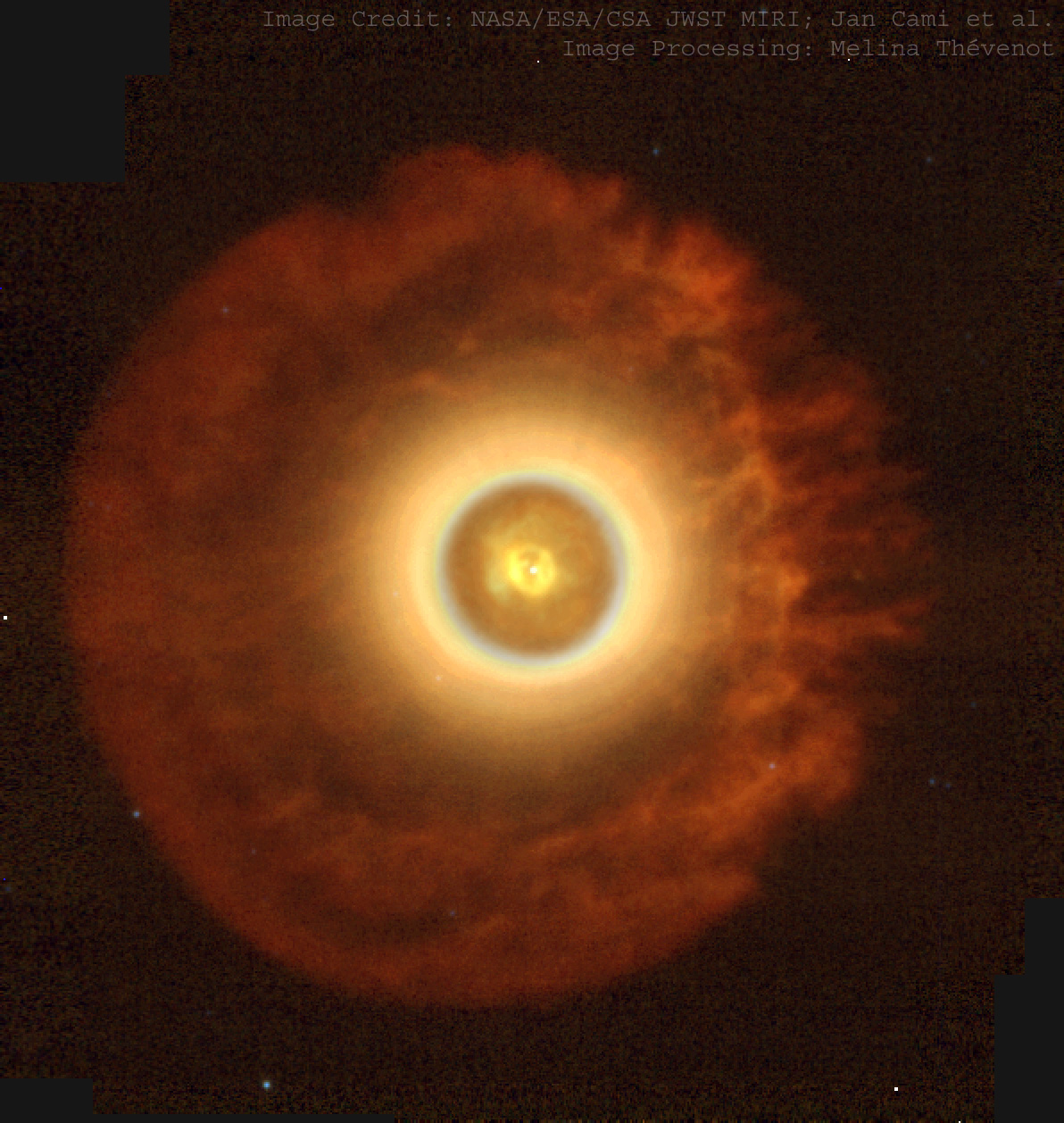
- Tc 1 nebula imaged by the James Webb Space Telescope MIRI instrument

Observation data: J2000.0 epoch
- Right ascension: 17^{h} 45^{m} 35.29^{s}
- Declination: −46° 05′ 23.7″
- Distance: 12,400 ly
- Constellation: Ara
- Designations: IC 1266, Tc 1

IC 1266 (also known as Tc 1, Thackeray 1) is a planetary nebula located in the constellation of Ara. Discovered in 1894 by astronomer Williamina Fleming, IC 1266 lies approximately 12,400 light-years from Earth and is best observed from the Southern Hemisphere.

== Observation and characteristics ==
IC 1266 has an apparent visual magnitude of 11.2 and spans about 0.2 arcminutes in diameter, making it one of the smaller known planetary nebulae. The central star is an O-type star HD 161044 and has a P Cygni type profile.

Spectroscopic and other studies reveal low-excitation lines typical of young planetary nebulae, with abundances of elements and molecules are found like the first fullerenes in space like C_{60} and C_{70} were discovered in this nebula in 2010 using the Spitzer Space Telescope. These molecules are therefore the largest found in space. Hydrogenated amorphous carbon grains were suggested to cause emission features in the infrared in IC 1266. These grains may be related to the formation of the fullerenes.

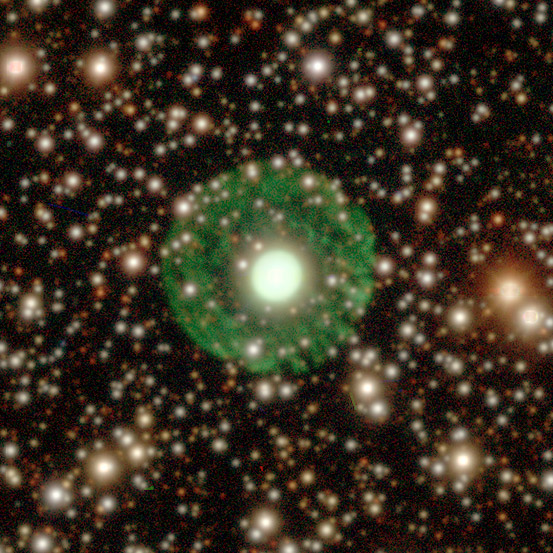
IC 1266 imaged by DECaPS

== Amateur astronomers ==
Amateur astronomers, looking for IC 1266 / Thackeray 1, could use HD 160715 and HD 160917 as guidestars. Both stars shine at magnitude + 7 and are, as seen from Earth, located immediately westnorthwest of IC 1266. A little less than 2 degrees westsouthwest of IC 1266 is the location of the star Sigma Arae (σ Arae). IC 1266 is located half a degree south of Eugène Joseph Delporte's boundary between the constellations Ara and Scorpius.
