= NGC 6250 =

Cluster of stars in the southern constellation of Ara

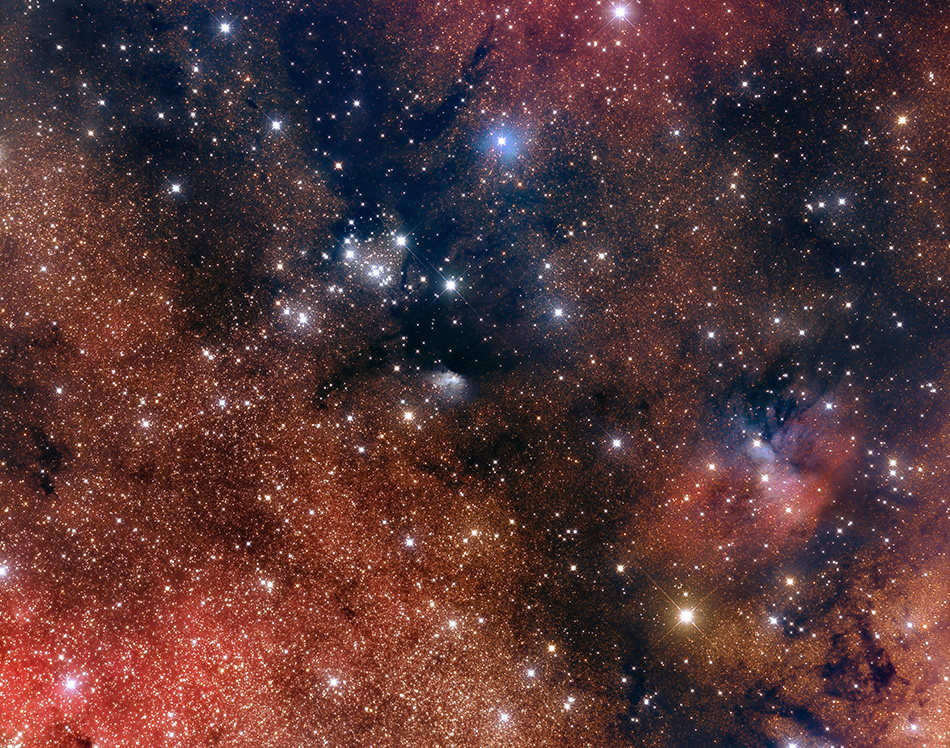

Observation data (J2000 epoch)
- Right ascension: 16^{h} 57^{m} 58.(0)^{s}
- Declination: −45° 56′ 3(6)″
- Distance: 2,820 ly (865 pc)
- Apparent magnitude (V): 5.9
- Apparent dimensions (V): 10′

Physical characteristics
- Estimated age: 14 Ma
- Other designations: NGC 6250, Cr 320, C 1654-457, ESO 277-SC20, OCL 991, VDBH 206.

Associations
- Constellation: Ara

NGC 6250 is an open cluster of stars in the southern constellation of Ara, near the border with Scorpius. It was discovered by English astronomer John Herschel on July 1, 1834. This cluster has an apparent visual magnitude of 5.9 and spans an angular diameter of 10′, with the brightest member being of magnitude 7.6. About 15 members are visible with binoculars or a small telescope. NGC 6250 is located at a distance of 2,820 ly (865 pc) from the Sun, and is approaching with a mean radial velocity of −10±6 km/s.

The Trumpler classification of NGC 6250 is II 3 r, indicating a rich cluster of stars (r) with a slightly disparate grouping (II) and a large brightness range (3). This is a young cluster with an estimated age of 14 million years. Seven cluster members are B-type stars, and three are illuminating reflection nebulae. Two magnetic chemically peculiar stars (CP2) and two candidate Lambda Boötis stars have been identified as members. The metallicity of the cluster members is consistent with the Sun.
