= NGC 6397 =

Globular cluster of stars in the Milky Way

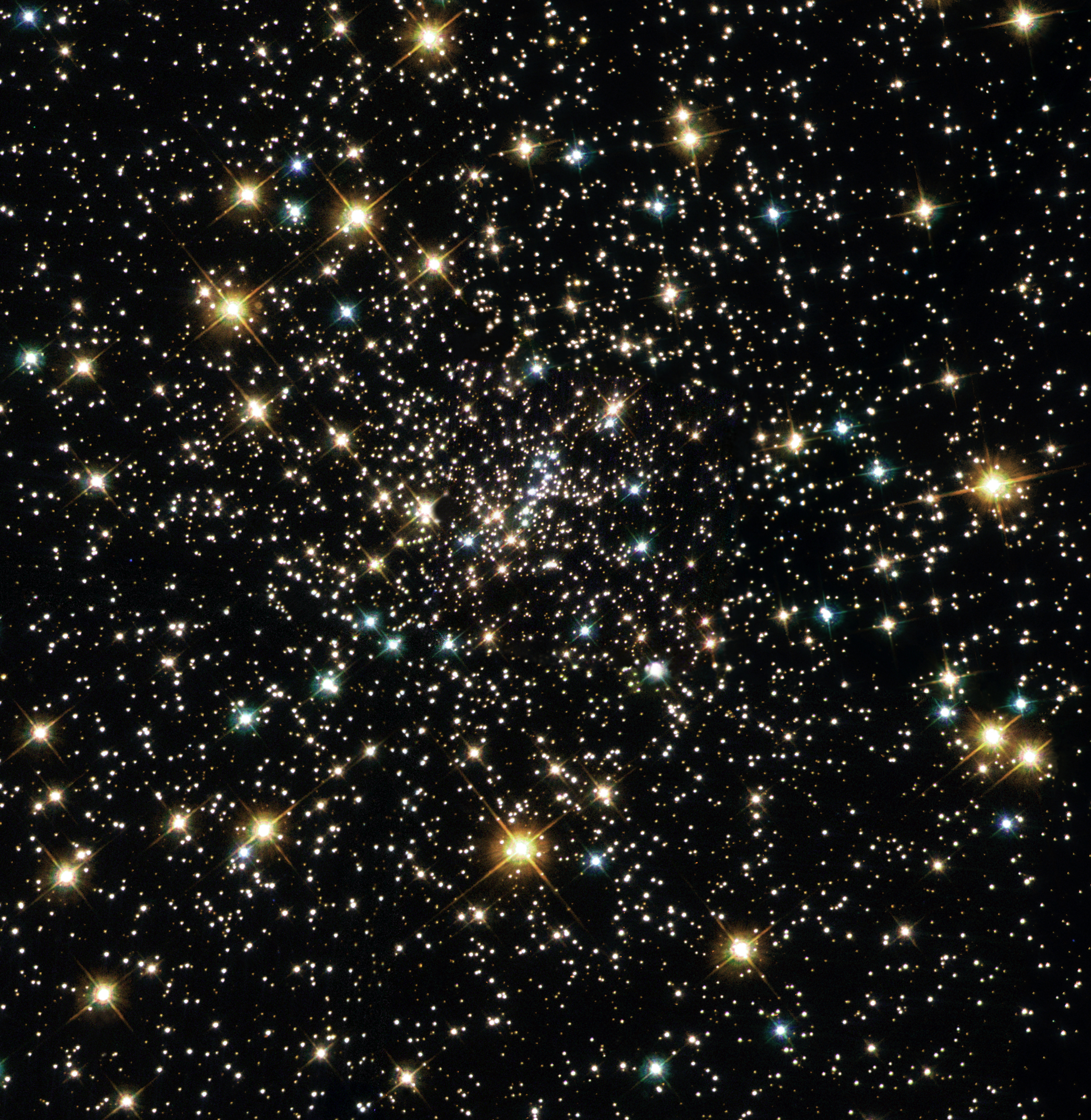
- A Hubble Space Telescope (HST) image of NGC 6397

Observation data (J2000 epoch)
- Class: IX
- Constellation: Ara
- Right ascension: 17^{h} 40^{m} 42.09^{s}
- Declination: –53° 40′ 27.6″
- Distance: 7.8 kly (2.4 kpc)
- Apparent magnitude (V): +6.68
- Apparent dimensions (V): 32.0′

Physical characteristics
- Mass: 1.14×10^{5} M_{☉}
- Radius: 36 ly
- V_{HB}: 14.2
- Metallicity: [Fe/H] = –1.76 dex
- Estimated age: 13.4 ± 0.8 Gyr
- Notable features: Second closest globular cluster
- Other designations: GCl 74, Lacaille III.11, Dunlop 366, Bennett 98, Caldwell 86

NGC 6397 (also known as Caldwell 86) is a globular cluster in the constellation Ara that was discovered by French astronomer Nicolas-Louis de Lacaille in 1752. It is located about 7,800 light-years from Earth, making it one of the two nearest globular clusters to Earth (the other one being Messier 4). The cluster contains around 400,000 stars, and can be seen with the naked eye under good observing conditions.

NGC 6397 is one of at least 20 globular clusters of the Milky Way Galaxy that have undergone a core collapse, meaning that the core has contracted to a very dense stellar agglomeration.

== Astronomical research ==
=== Estimating the age of the Milky Way ===
In 2004, a team of astronomers focused on the cluster to estimate the age of the Milky Way Galaxy. They used the UV-Visual Echelle Spectrograph of the Very Large Telescope at Cerro Paranal to measure the beryllium content of two stars in the cluster. This allowed them to deduce the time elapsed between the rise of the first generation of stars in the entire Galaxy and the first generation of stars in the cluster. This, added to the estimated age of the stars in the cluster, gives an estimate for the age for the Galaxy: about 13.6 billion years, which is nearly as old as the universe itself. This estimate assumes that the NGC 6397 is not older than the Milky Way.

=== Lower mass limit for stars ===
In 2006, a study of NGC 6397 using the Hubble Space Telescope was published that showed a clear lower limit in the brightness of the cluster's population of faint stars. The authors deduce that this indicates a lower limit for the mass necessary for stars to develop a core capable of fusion: roughly 0.083 times the mass of the Sun.

=== Black holes and white dwarfs ===
In February 2021, the core of NGC 6397 was reported to contain a relatively dense concentration of compact objects (white dwarfs, neutron stars and black holes), based on the movement of stars near the core derived from data gathered by the Hubble Space Telescope and the European Space Agency's Gaia spacecraft. The respective study argued that black holes could dominate the mass budget of this concentration, if the black holes were not ejected by means of dynamical interactions. Indeed, another group of scientists shortly responded, claiming that because NGC 6397 has undergone core collapse, it should have started dense enough to speed its rates of dynamical interactions, and its original black hole population should be almost entirely gone. This group provided dynamical simulations that showed that a concentration of white dwarfs could explain the first measurement.

Finally, in 2022, a work was published by the former scientists, along with one of the leaders of the latter group, and other experts of Hubble and Gaia data. This new work showed that the fits of the central mass excess in NGC 6397 from observed data agreed remarkably well with numerical simulations accounting for a population of hundreds of massive white dwarfs, and essentially no black holes.

=== Distant globular clusters ===
Hubble pictures revealed many distant globular clusters in galaxies far behind NGC 6397.

== Gallery ==
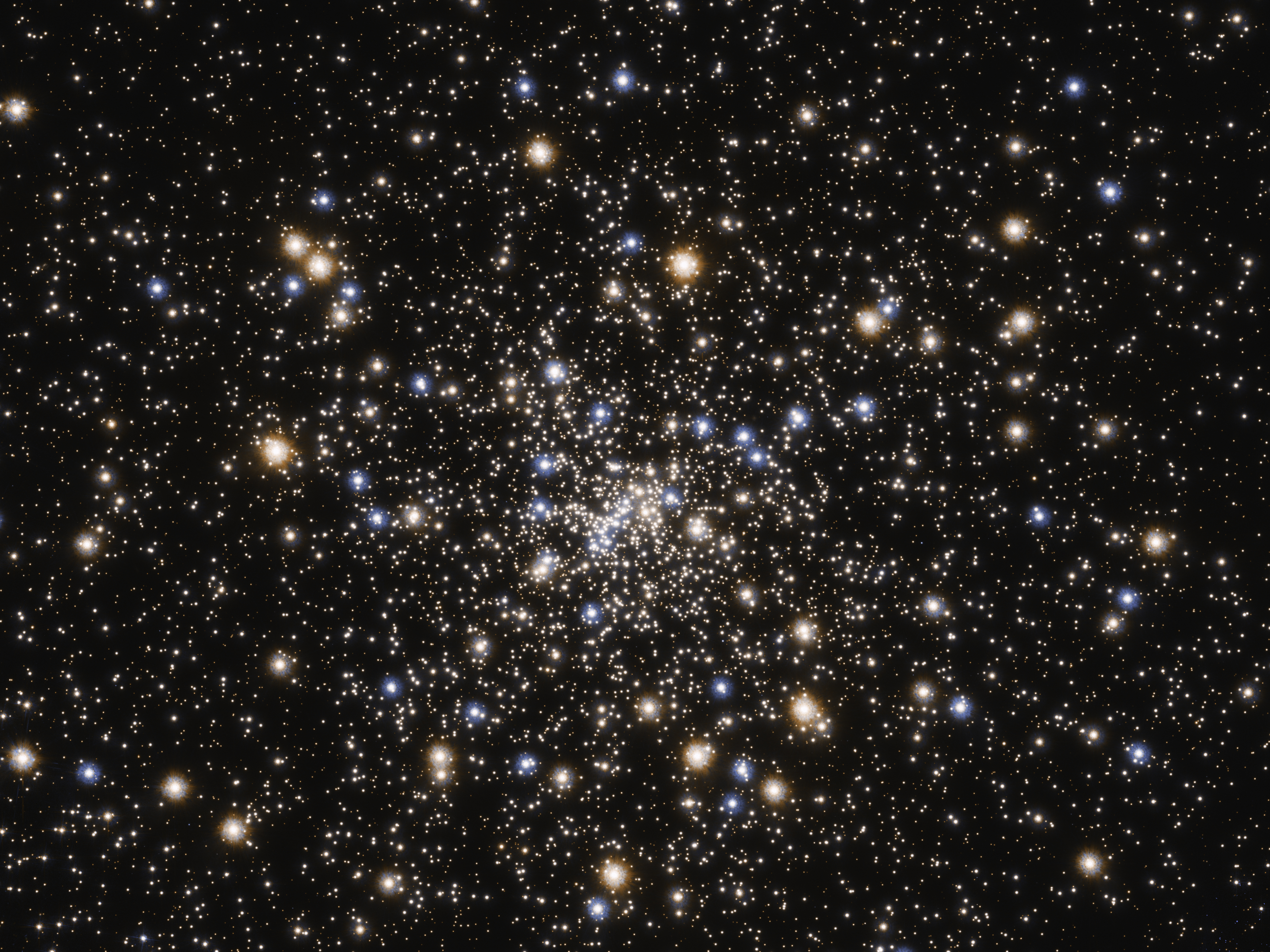
Hubble's view of globular cluster NGC 6397

NGC 6397 region double observation HST and JWST

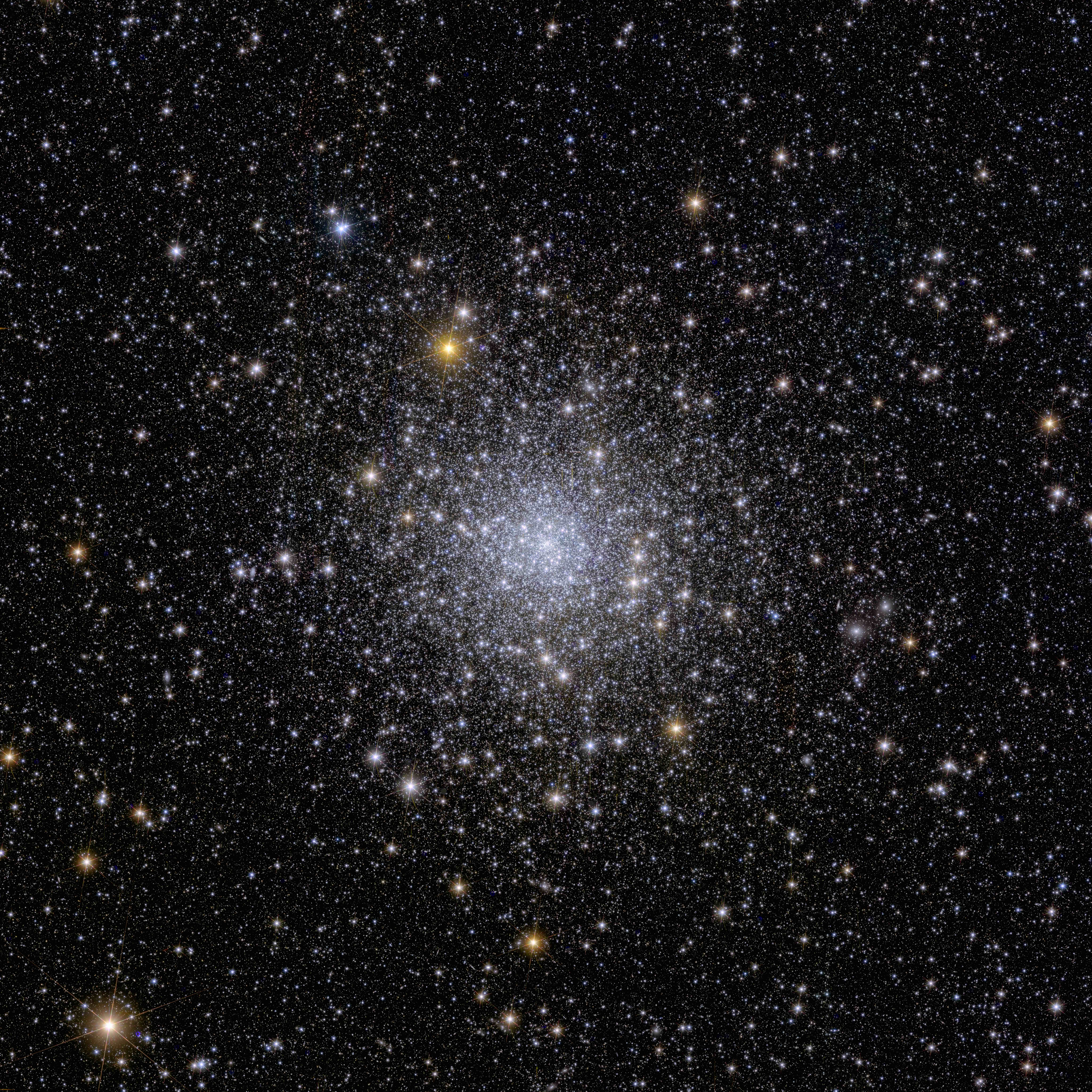
NGC 6397 imaged by Euclid

== See also ==
- List of brightest stars
- List of nearest bright stars
- Lists of stars
- Historical brightest stars
