= NGC 6215 =

Galaxy in the constellation Ara

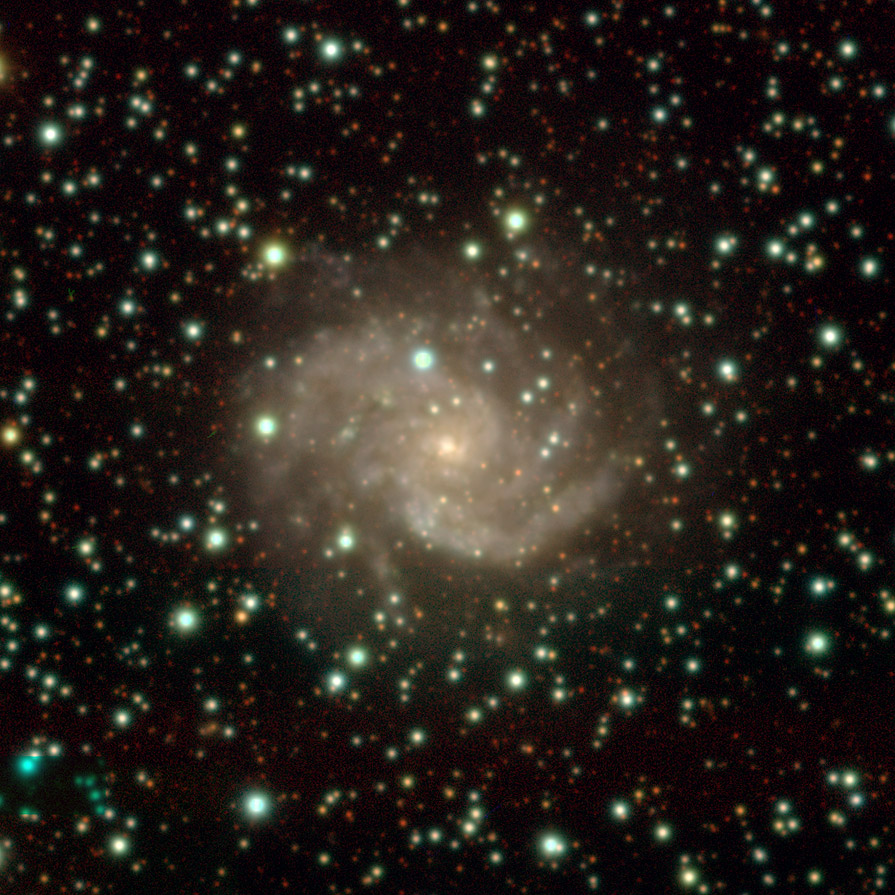
- NGC 6215 with DECaPS

Observation data (J2000 epoch)
- Constellation: Ara
- Right ascension: 16^{h} 51^{m} 06.811^{s}
- Declination: −58° 59′ 36.46″
- Redshift: 0.005204
- Heliocentric radial velocity: 1552 km/s
- Apparent magnitude (V): 11.2

Characteristics
- Type: SA(s)c
- Size: 46,000 light years
- Apparent size (V): 2.10′ x 1.80′

Other designations
- ESO 137-46, PGC 59112, h 3647, GC 4235, IRAS 16467-5854

NGC 6215 (also known as PGC 59112) is a spiral galaxy located in the constellation Ara. It is designated as SA(s)c in the galaxy morphological classification scheme. It was discovered by astronomer John Herschel on 9 July 1836.

== Galaxy group information ==
NGC 6215 is part of galaxy group NGC 6221/15, which includes barred spiral galaxy NGC 6221 and three dwarf galaxies. A double-stranded bridge of neutral hydrogen gas connects NGC 6215 and 6221 as a result of their interaction, and Dwarf 3 of the three dwarf galaxies may have formed from the bridging gas.

== See also ==
- List of NGC objects (6001-7000)
- List of NGC objects
