= NGC 6204 =

Open cluster in the constellation Ara

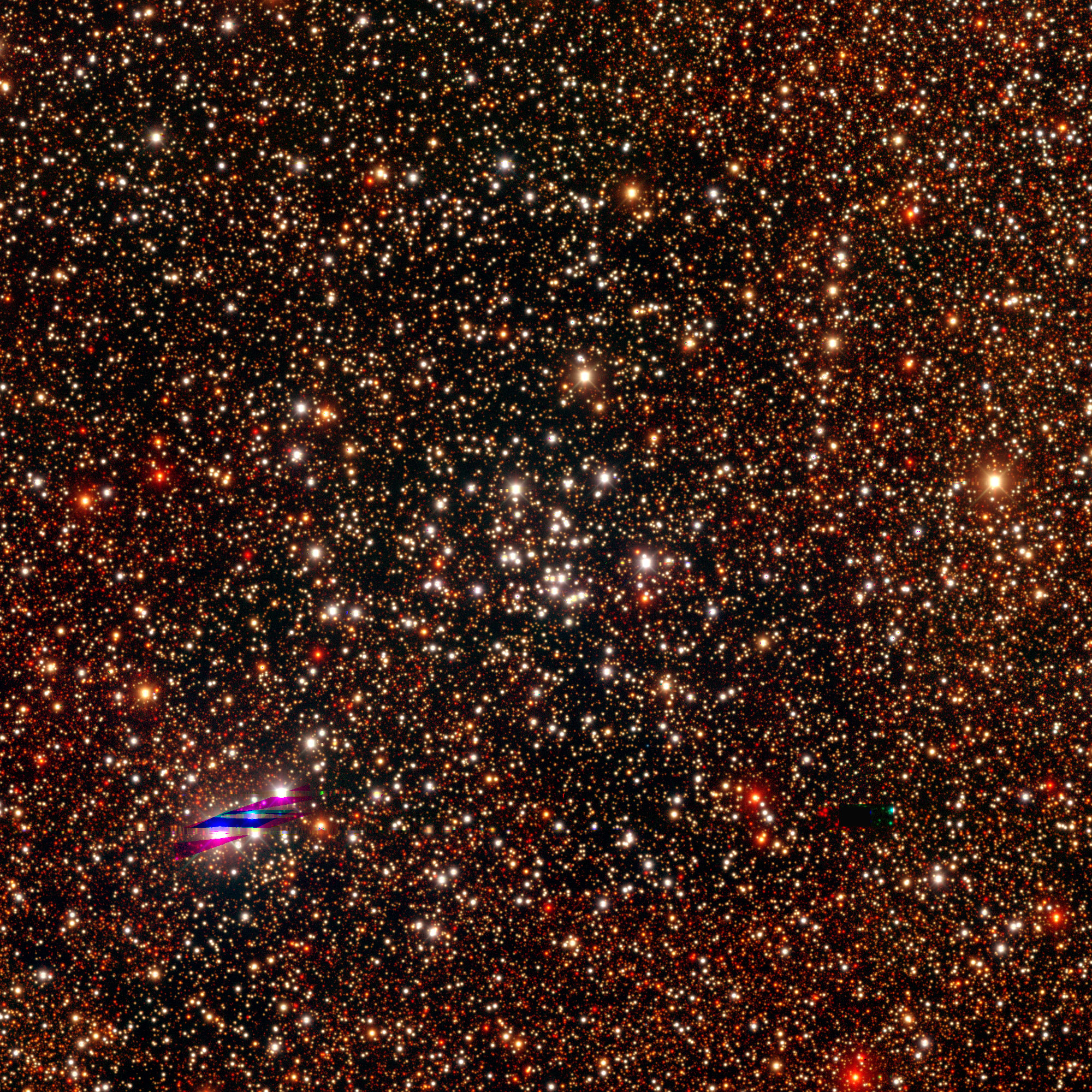
- NGC 6204; Credit: DECaPS

Observation data (J2000 epoch)
- Right ascension: 16^{h} 46^{m} 08.(4)^{s}
- Declination: −47° 01′ 1(2)″
- Distance: 3,540 ly (1,085 pc)
- Apparent magnitude (V): 8.2
- Apparent dimensions (V): 6′

Physical characteristics
- Other designations: Collinder 312, Lund 723

Associations
- Constellation: Ara

NGC 6204 is an open cluster in the constellation Ara, lying close to the galactic equator. It is 3,540 ly (1,085 pc) distant from Earth. The cluster was discovered on 13 May 1826 by British astronomer James Dunlop.

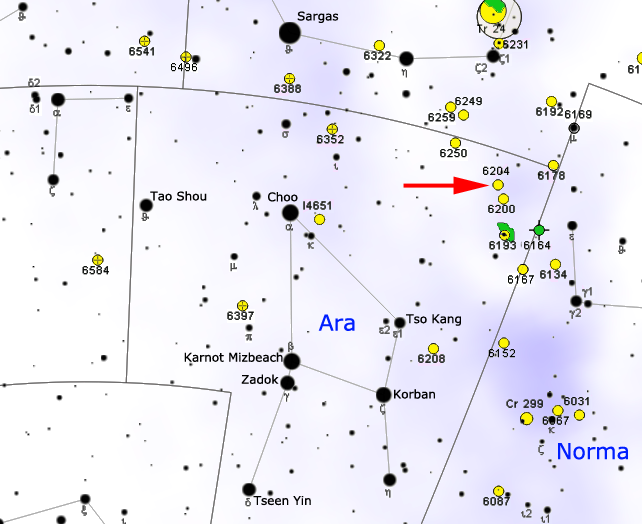
Map showing the location of NGC 6204
