= A. David Thackeray =

South African astronomer

Andrew David Thackeray (19 June 1910 – 21 February 1978), was an astronomer trained at Cambridge University. He served as director of the Radcliffe Observatory for 23 years.

== Career ==
Thackeray went to school at Eton College, where he observed meteors for the British Astronomical Association. He went on to study mathematics at King's College, Cambridge. He received a PhD on theoretical stellar spectroscopy in 1937 from the Solar Physics Laboratory in Cambridge. During his studies he worked at the Mount Wilson Observatory in California from 1934 to 1936. He was Assistant Director of the Solar Physics Observatory at Cambridge Observatory from 1937 to 1948. He was then director of the Radcliffe Observatory, Pretoria from 1951 until it was merged with the Royal Observatory, Cape of Good Hope in 1974 to form the South African Astronomical Observatory. He became an honorary professor of the University of Cape Town and, a few days before his death, an Associate of the Royal Astronomical Society.

== Research ==
He specialized in stellar spectroscopy. At a conference of the International Astronomical Union in Rome in 1952, he presented results of studies of variable stars in the Magellanic Clouds, indicating that the perceived age and size of the universe had to be doubled. He was the discoverer of Thackeray's Globules in 1950. Planetary nebula IC 1266 is also known as Tc 1 (Thackeray 1).

== Personal life ==
He was born on 19 June 1910 in Chelsea, London. His father was the classical scholar Henry St. John Thackeray. He died in an accident on 21 February 1978. He was a nephew of Mary Acworth Evershed.

== Published works ==
- Astronomical spectroscopy. London: Eyre & Spottiswood. 1961. p. 256. ISBN 978-0-02-419850-1.
- Feast, M. W.; Thackeray, A. D.; Wesselink, A. J. (1960). "The Brightest Stars in the Magellanic Clouds". Monthly Notices of the Royal Astronomical Society. 121 (4): 337–385. Bibcode:1960MNRAS.121..337F. doi:10.1093/mnras/121.4.337. ISSN 0035-8711.
