= NGC 6221 =

Galaxy in the constellation Ara

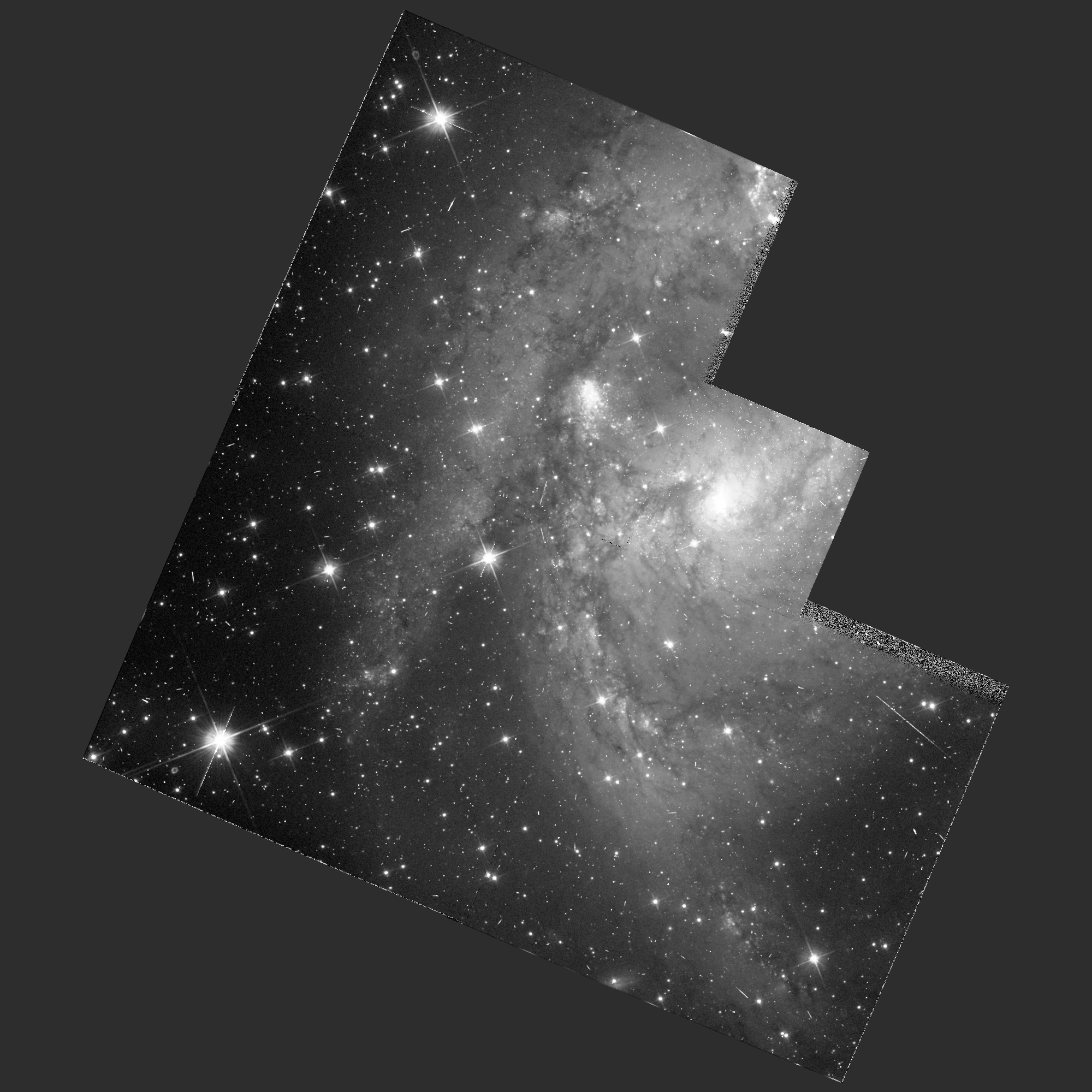
- NGC 6221 as seen through the Hubble Space Telescope

Observation data (J2000 epoch)
- Constellation: Ara
- Right ascension: 16^{h} 52^{m} 46.1^{s}
- Declination: −59° 13′ 07″
- Redshift: 0.004999±0.000017
- Heliocentric radial velocity: 1499±5 km/s
- Galactocentric velocity: 1390±7 km/s
- Apparent magnitude (V): 9.28
- Absolute magnitude (V): −20.97

Characteristics
- Type: SB(s)bc
- Size: 70,000 light years
- Apparent size (V): 3.5′ × 2.5′

Other designations
- ESO 138-3, AM 1648-590, IRAS16484-5908 and PGC 59175
- References: NASA/IPAC extragalactic datatbase, http://spider.seds.org/

NGC 6221 (also known as PGC 59175) is a barred spiral galaxy located in the constellation Ara. In de Vaucouleurs' galaxy morphological classification scheme, it is classified as SB(s)bc and was discovered by British astronomer John Herschel on 3 May 1835. NGC 6221 is located at about 69 million light years from Earth.

== Galaxy group information ==
NGC 6221 is part of galaxy group NGC 6221/15, which includes spiral galaxy NGC 6215 and three dwarf galaxies. Interactions between NGC 6221 and NGC 6215 form a double-stranded bridge of neutral hydrogen gas over a projected distance of 100 kpc; Dwarf 3 of the three dwarf galaxies may have formed from the bridging gas.

== Supernovae ==
Two supernovae have been observed in NGC 6221:

- SN 1990W (Type Ib/Ic, mag. 15) was discovered by Robert Evans on 16 August 1990.
- SN 2024pxg (Type II, mag. 15.1) was discovered by the Distance Less Than 40 Mpc Survey (DLT40) on 23 July 2024.

== See also ==
- List of NGC objects (6001–7000)
- New General Catalogue
