= NGC 6326 =

Planetary nebula in the constellation Ara

Emission nebula
- Planetary nebula
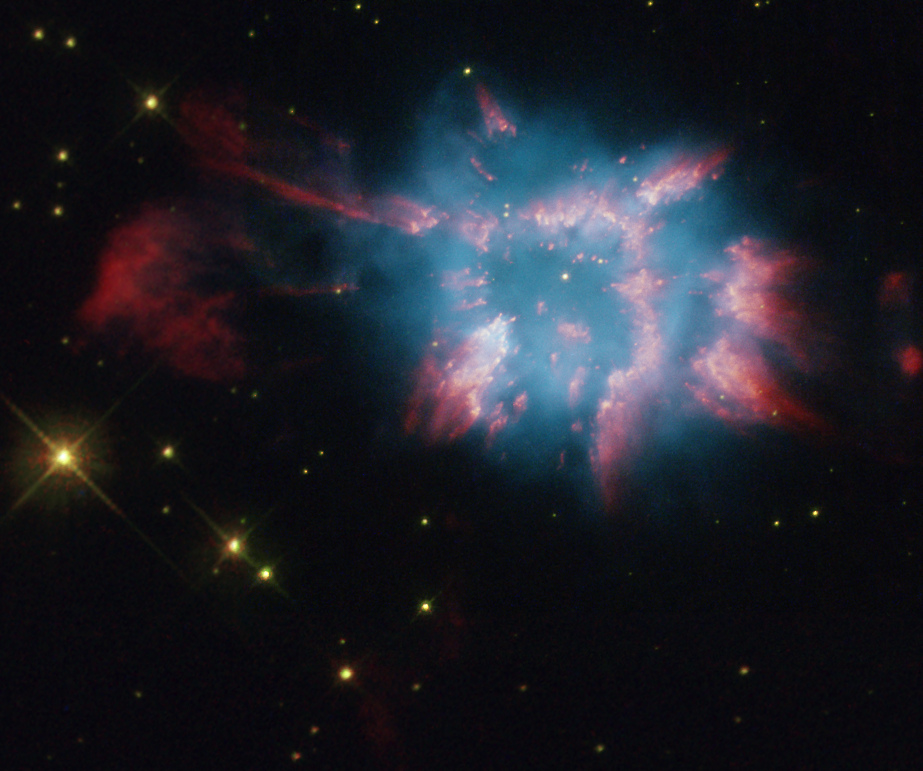
- NGC 6326 as seen through the Hubble Space Telescope

Observation data: J2000 epoch
- Right ascension: 17^{h} 20^{m} 46.3^{s}
- Declination: −51° 45′ 16″
- Apparent magnitude (V): 12.2
- Apparent dimensions (V): 0.32′
- Constellation: Ara

Physical characteristics
- Radius: 0.5 ly
- Designations: PK 338-8.1, ESO 228-PN1, AM 1716-514 and CS=13.5

NGC 6326 is a complex and irregularly structured planetary nebula located in the constellation Ara. It was discovered by Scottish astronomer James Dunlop on 26 August 1826. NGC 6326 is the result of the ejected material from the central binary star, which is nearing the end of its life. The blue and red color is due to the amount of radiation the star releases, thus causing the gasses to glow. NGC 6326 is located at about 11,000 light years away from Earth.

== See also ==
- List of NGC objects (6001–7000)
- List of NGC objects
