= NGC 6200 =

Open star cluster in the constellation Ara

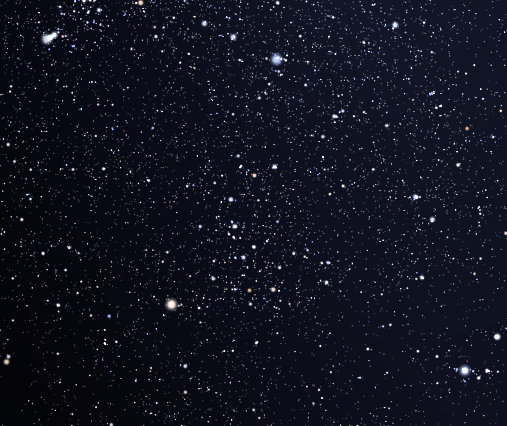
- NGC 6200 (taken with Stellarium)

Observation data (J2000 epoch)
- Right ascension: 16^{h} 44^{m} 06.(0)^{s}
- Declination: −47° 28′ (00)″
- Distance: 6,700 ly (2,054 pc)
- Apparent magnitude (V): 7.4
- Apparent dimensions (V): 12′

Physical characteristics
- Radius: 11.7 ly
- Other designations: Cr 311, C1640-473, ESO 277-SC8, OCL 978

Associations
- Constellation: Ara

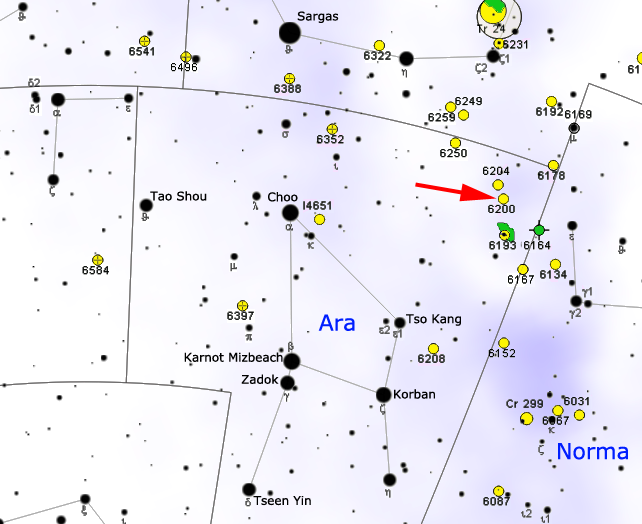
Map showing the location of NGC 6200

NGC 6200 is an open cluster in the constellation Ara, lying close to the galactic equator. It contains one β Cephei variable.
