= Eta Arae =

Star in the constellation Ara

- The location of η Arae (circled)

Observation data Epoch J2000 Equinox ICRS
- Constellation: Ara
- Right ascension: 16^{h} 49^{m} 47.156^{s}
- Declination: −59° 02′ 28.97″
- Apparent magnitude (V): 3.76

Characteristics
- Spectral type: K5 III
- U−B color index: +1.93
- B−V color index: +1.57

Astrometry
Radial velocity (R_{v})	+9.00±0.14 km/s
Proper motion (μ)	RA: +38.990 mas/yr Dec.: −26.095 mas/yr
Parallax (π)	10.6993±0.1289 mas
Distance	305 ± 4 ly (93 ± 1 pc)
Absolute magnitude (M_{V})	−1.14±0.14

Details
Mass	1.12±0.16 M_{☉}
Radius	40.44±2.62 R_{☉}
Luminosity	575 L_{☉}
Surface gravity (log g)	1.06±0.06 cgs
Temperature	4,147±29 K
Metallicity [Fe/H]	−0.47±0.03 dex
Rotational velocity (v sin i)	1.55±0.55 km/s
Age	4.98±1.86 Gyr

Other designations
- η Ara, CPD−58°6906, FK5 1435, HD 151249, HIP 82363, HR 6229, SAO 244168, WDS J16498-5902A

Database references
SIMBAD	data

Eta Arae is a single star in the southern constellation of Ara. Its name is a Bayer designation that is Latinized from η Arae, and abbreviated Eta Ara or η Ara. This star is visible to the naked eye with an apparent visual magnitude of 3.76. Based on parallax measurements, it is approximately 305 light-years (94 parsecs) distance from Earth. The star is moving away from the Sun with a radial velocity of +9 km/s.

The spectrum of this star matches a stellar classification of K5 III, indicating that, at an estimated age of five billion years, it has reached the giant star stage of its evolution. With 1.12 times the mass of the Sun, it has an outer envelope that has expanded to 40 times the Sun's radius. The star is now spinning so slowly that it takes more than eleven years to complete a single rotation. Eta Arae is radiating energy into space from its photosphere with 575 times the Sun's luminosity at an effective temperature of 4,147 K, giving it the orange-hued glow of a K-type star.

It has a magnitude 13.5 optical companion, located 23.4 arcseconds away along a position angle of 118°, as of 2000.
