= Gamma Arae =

Star in the constellation Ara

γ Arae
- Location of γ Arae (circled)

Observation data Epoch J2000 Equinox J2000
- Constellation: Ara
- Right ascension: 17^{h} 25^{m} 23.65931^{s}
- Declination: −56° 22′ 39.8148″
- Apparent magnitude (V): 3.34

Characteristics
- Spectral type: B1 Ib
- U−B color index: −0.96
- B−V color index: −0.13

Astrometry
Radial velocity (R_{v})	−3±2.9 km/s
Proper motion (μ)	RA: −0.44 mas/yr Dec.: −15.77 mas/yr
Parallax (π)	2.93±0.16 mas
Distance	1,110 ± 60 ly (340 ± 20 pc)
Absolute magnitude (M_{V})	−5.8

Details
Mass	12.5 M_{☉} 19 M_{☉}
Radius	14.20±0.28 R_{☉}
Luminosity	120,000 L_{☉}
Surface gravity (log g)	3.50±0.04 cgs
Temperature	21,240±212 K
Rotation	4.8 days
Rotational velocity (v sin i)	269±11 km/s
Age	15.7±0.1 Myr

Other designations
- γ Ara, CPD−56°8225, GC 23517, HD 157246, HIP 85267, HR 6462, SAO 244726, PPM 345992, WDS J17254-5623A

Database references
SIMBAD	data

Gamma Arae is a massive star in the southern constellation of Ara. Its name is a Bayer designation that is Latinized from γ Arae, and abbreviated Gamma Ara or γ Ara. With an apparent visual magnitude of 3.3, it is the fourth-brightest star in the constellation and is readily visible to the naked eye. From parallax measurements made during the Hipparcos mission, the distance to this star can be estimated as 1,110 light-years (340 parsecs) from Earth.

The proper motion of this star traces back to the Scorpius region of the Galactic Plane, about 20–25° away. Gamma Arae has an optical companion located at an angular separation of 17.9 arcseconds, which is an A-type main sequence star with an apparent magnitude of 10.5.

== Properties ==
This is an enormous star with 14 times the radius of the Sun. It is radiating 120,000 as much energy as the Sun from its outer envelope at an effective temperature of 21,240 K. This heat gives the star the blue-white glow of a B-type star. The spectrum shows it to match a stellar classification of B1 Ib, with the luminosity class of 'Ib' indicating this is a lower luminosity supergiant star. It is a relatively young body, with an estimated age of around 15.7 million years.

Gamma Arae is rotating rapidly with a projected rotational velocity of 269 km s^{−1}, causing it to complete a full rotation about every 4.8 days. In the spectrum of this star, this high rate of spin is causing absorption lines to blend together because of the Doppler effect, making them more difficult to analyze. It is a periodically variable star that undergoes non-radial pulsations with a primary period of 1.1811 days and a secondary period of 0.1281 days.

There is some disagreement about the mass of this star in the literature. Tetzlaff et al. (2011) estimate the mass as 12.5±0.6 solar masses, while Fraser et al. (2010) give a mass of around 19 and Lefever et al. (2007) lists a value of 25. It is shedding mass through its stellar wind at the rate of 3.0×10^{−8} solar masses per year, which is equivalent to losing the mass of the Sun every 33 million years. The wind is being affected by the star's rapid rotation, resulting in an enhanced outflow along the equator.
