= Sigma Arae =

Star in the constellation Ara

- The location of σ Arae (circled)

Observation data Epoch J2000 Equinox ICRS
- Constellation: Ara
- Right ascension: 17^{h} 35^{m} 39.591^{s}
- Declination: −46° 30′ 20.46″
- Apparent magnitude (V): +4.575

Characteristics
- Spectral type: A0 V
- U−B color index: −0.064
- B−V color index: −0.027

Astrometry
Radial velocity (R_{v})	−9.28±0.33 km/s
Proper motion (μ)	RA: −25.046 mas/yr Dec.: −38.30 mas/yr
Parallax (π)	8.5285±0.1394 mas
Distance	382 ± 6 ly (117 ± 2 pc)
Absolute magnitude (M_{V})	1.40

Details
Mass	2.56±0.35 M_{☉}
Radius	4.90±0.22 R_{☉}
Luminosity	215±22 L_{☉}
Surface gravity (log g)	3.47±0.07 cgs
Temperature	9,986±206 K

Other designations
- σ Arae, CD−46 11661, GC 23815, HD 159217, HIP 86092, HR 6537, SAO 228162, PPM 323154, TIC 16245795

Database references
SIMBAD	data

Sigma Arae is a star in the southern constellation of Ara. Its name is a Bayer designation that is Latinized from σ Arae, and abbreviated Sigma Ara or σ Ara. This star is visible to the naked eye with an apparent visual magnitude of +4.575. The distance to this star, based upon an annual parallax shift of 8.53 mas, is approximately 382 light-years (117 pc). It is drifting closer to the Sun with a radial velocity of −9 km/s.

This is an A-type main sequence star with a stellar classification of A0 V. It has 2.6 times the mass of the Sun and 4.9 times the Sun's radius. The star is radiating 215 times the luminosity of the Sun from its photosphere at an effective temperature of 9,986 K. Unusually for an A-type star, X-ray emissions with a luminosity of 4.6×10^{29} erg s^{−1} have been detected from Sigma Arae. Normally this is explained by the presence of a lower mass orbiting companion star. However, such a scenario does not appear to hold true for this star. Instead, the signature of a surface magnetic field has been detected with a strength of roughly 128±73 Gauss, indicating the source of the X-rays may be surface magnetic activity.

A little less than 2 degrees eastnortheast of σ Arae is the location of planetary nebula IC 1266 (Tc 1, Thackeray 1).
