= Epsilon1 Arae =

Star in the constellation Ara

Epsilon^{1} Arae
- The location of ε^{1} Arae (circled)

Observation data Epoch J2000.0 Equinox ICRS
- Constellation: Ara
- Right ascension: 16^{h} 59^{m} 35.048^{s}
- Declination: −53° 09′ 37.58″
- Apparent magnitude (V): +4.068

Characteristics
- Spectral type: K3 III
- U−B color index: +1.71
- B−V color index: +1.45

Astrometry
Radial velocity (R_{v})	+23.85±0.03 km/s
Proper motion (μ)	RA: +1.015 mas/yr Dec.: +21.455 mas/yr
Parallax (π)	8.8520±0.1517 mas
Distance	368 ± 6 ly (113 ± 2 pc)
Absolute magnitude (M_{V})	−0.79±0.16

Details
Mass	1.63±0.21 M_{☉}
Radius	29.52±2.45 R_{☉}
Luminosity	347^{+90}_{−71} L_{☉}
Surface gravity (log g)	1.85±0.07 cgs
Temperature	4,302±45 K
Metallicity [Fe/H]	−0.19±0.06 dex
Rotational velocity (v sin i)	4.20±0.45 km/s
Age	1.82±0.60 Gyr

Other designations
- CPD−52°10372, FK5 632, GC 22869, HD 152980, HIP 83153, HR 6295, SAO 244331, PPM 345574

Database references
SIMBAD	data

Epsilon^{1} Arae is a star in the southern constellation Ara, the Altar. Its name is a Bayer designation that is Latinized from ε^{1} Arae, and abbreviated Epsilon^{1} Ara or ε^{1} Ara. This star is visible to the naked eye with an apparent visual magnitude of +4.1 Based upon an annual parallax shift of 8.85 mas, this star is approximately 368 light-years (113 parsecs) distant from the Earth. It is drifting further away with a radial velocity of +24 km/s.

ε^{1} Arae is an evolved giant star with a stellar classification of K3 III. It is around 63% more massive than the Sun. At an age of about 1.8 billion years, the outer envelope of the star has expanded to almost 30 times the Sun's radius. It is radiating 347 times the luminosity of the Sun from its photosphere at an effective temperature of 4,302 K, giving it the orange-hued glow of a K-type star.

ε^{1} Arae was known as 龜一(spelled as "Guī yī", meaning: "the 1st (star) of Guī") in traditional Chinese astronomy. Allen erroneously called it Tso Kang (左更). He probably confused the constellation "Ara" with "Ari", as Tso Kang is actually in Aries.
