= Ara (constellation) =

Constellation in the southern celestial hemisphere

- Constellation
- List of stars in Ara
- Abbreviation: Ara
- Genitive: Arae
- Pronunciation: /ˈɛərə/, genitive /ˈɛəriː/ (Note: Random House Dictionary)
- Symbolism: the Altar
- Right ascension: 16^{h} 34^{m} 16.9497^{s}–18^{h} 10^{m} 41.3407^{s}
- Declination: −45.4859734°–−67.6905823°
- Area: 237 sq. deg. (63rd)
- Main stars: 8
- Bayer/Flamsteed stars: 17
- Stars brighter than 3.00^{m}: 2
- Stars within 10.00 pc (32.62 ly): 3
- Brightest star: β Ara (2.84^{m})
- Nearest star: Gliese 674
- Messier objects: 0
- Meteor showers: 0
- Bordering constellations: Corona Australis; Scorpius; Norma; Triangulum Australe; Apus; Pavo; Telescopium
- Visible at latitudes between +22° and −90°. Best visible at 21:00 (9 p.m.) during the month of July.

Ara (Latin for "the Altar") is a southern constellation between Scorpius, Telescopium, Triangulum Australe, and Norma. Under its Greek name Βωμός, Bōmǒs, it was one of the 48 classical constellations described by the 2nd-century astronomer Ptolemy, and it remains one of the 88 modern constellations designated by the International Astronomical Union.

The orange supergiant Beta Arae is the brightest star in Ara, with a near-constant apparent magnitude of 2.85, and is marginally brighter than the blue-white Alpha Arae. Seven star systems are known to host planets. Sunlike Mu Arae hosts four known planets. Gliese 676 is a (gravity-paired) binary red dwarf system with four known planets.

The Milky Way crosses the northwestern part of Ara. Within the constellation is Westerlund 1, a super star cluster that contains the red supergiant Westerlund 1-26, one of the largest stars known.

== History ==
In ancient Greek mythology, Ara was identified as the altar where the gods first made offerings and formed an alliance before defeating the Titans. One of the southernmost constellations depicted by Ptolemy, it had been recorded by Aratus in 270 BC as lying close to the horizon, and the Almagest portrays stars as far south as Gamma Arae. Professor Bradley Schaefer proposes such Ancients must have been able to see as far south as Zeta Arae, for a pattern that looked like an altar.

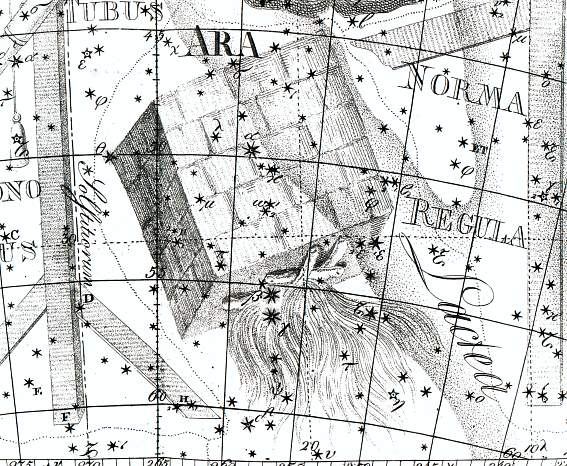
Johann Elert Bode's illustration of Ara, from his Uranographia (1801)

In illustrations, Ara is usually depicted as compact classical altar with its smoke 'rising' southward. However, depictions often vary. In the early days of printing, a 1482 woodcut of Gaius Julius Hyginus's classic Poeticon Astronomicon depicts the altar as surrounded by demons. Johann Bayer in 1603 depicted Ara as an altar with burning incense. Indeed, frankincense burners were common throughout the Levant especially in the Yemen, where they are known as Mabkhara. This required live coals or burning embers called Jamra', in order to burn the incense. Willem Blaeu, a Dutch uranographer of the 16th and 17th centuries, drew Ara as an altar for sacrifices, with a burning animal offering unusually whose smoke rises northward, represented by Alpha Arae.

The Castle of Knowledge by Robert Record of 1556 lists the constellation stating that "Under the Scorpions tayle, standeth the Altar."; a decade later a translation of a fairly recent mainly astrological work by Marcellus Palingenius of 1565, by Barnabe Googe states "Here mayst thou both the Altar, and the myghty Cup beholde."

== Characteristics ==
Covering 237.1 square degrees and hence 0.575% of the sky, Ara ranks 63rd of the 88 modern constellations by area. Its position in the Southern Celestial Hemisphere means that the whole constellation is visible to observers south of 22°N. (Note: Although parts of the constellation technically rise above the horizon to observers between the 22°N and 44°N, stars within a few degrees of the horizon are to all intents and purposes unobservable.) Scorpius runs along the length of its northern border, while Norma and Triangulum Australe border it to the west, Apus to the south, and Pavo and Telescopium to the east respectively. The three-letter abbreviation for the constellation, as adopted by the International Astronomical Union, is "Ara". The official constellation boundaries, as set by Belgian astronomer Eugène Delporte in 1930, (Note: Delporte had proposed standardising the constellation boundaries to the International Astronomical Union, who had agreed and gave him the lead role) are defined by a polygon of twelve segments. In the equatorial coordinate system, the right ascension coordinates of these borders lie between 16^{h} 36.1^{m} and 18^{h} 10.4^{m} , while the declination coordinates are between −45.49° and −67.69°.

== Features ==
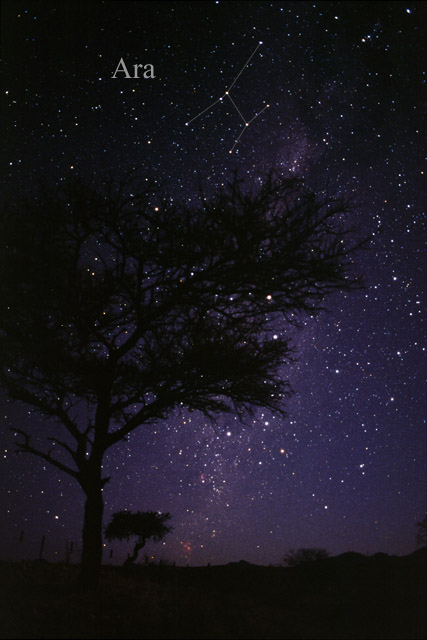
The constellation Ara as it can be seen by the naked eye.

=== Stars ===
Bayer gave eight stars Bayer designations, labelling them Alpha through to Theta, though he had never seen the constellation directly as it never rises above the horizon in Germany. After charting the southern constellations, French astronomer Nicolas-Louis de Lacaille recharted the stars of Ara from Alpha through to Sigma, including three pairs of stars next to each other as Epsilon, Kappa and Nu, and omitted Omicron and Xi.

Ara contains part of the Milky Way to the south of Scorpius and thus has rich star fields. Within the constellation's borders, there are 71 stars brighter than or equal to apparent magnitude 6.5. (Note: Objects of magnitude 6.5 are among the faintest visible to the unaided eye in suburban-rural transition night skies.)

Beta Arae, apparent magnitude 2.85, is the brightest star in the constellation, about 0.1 mag brighter than Alpha Arae although the difference in brightness between the two is undetectable by the unaided eye. Beta is an orange-hued star of spectral type K3Ib-IIa that has been classified as a supergiant or bright giant, and lies around 650 light-years from Earth. It is over 8 times as massive and 5,636 times as luminous as the Sun. Close to Beta Arae is Gamma Arae, a blue-hued supergiant of spectral type B1Ib. Of apparent magnitude 3.3, it is 1110 ± 60 light-years from Earth. It has been estimated to be between 12.5 and 25 times as massive as the Sun, and have around 120,000 times its luminosity.

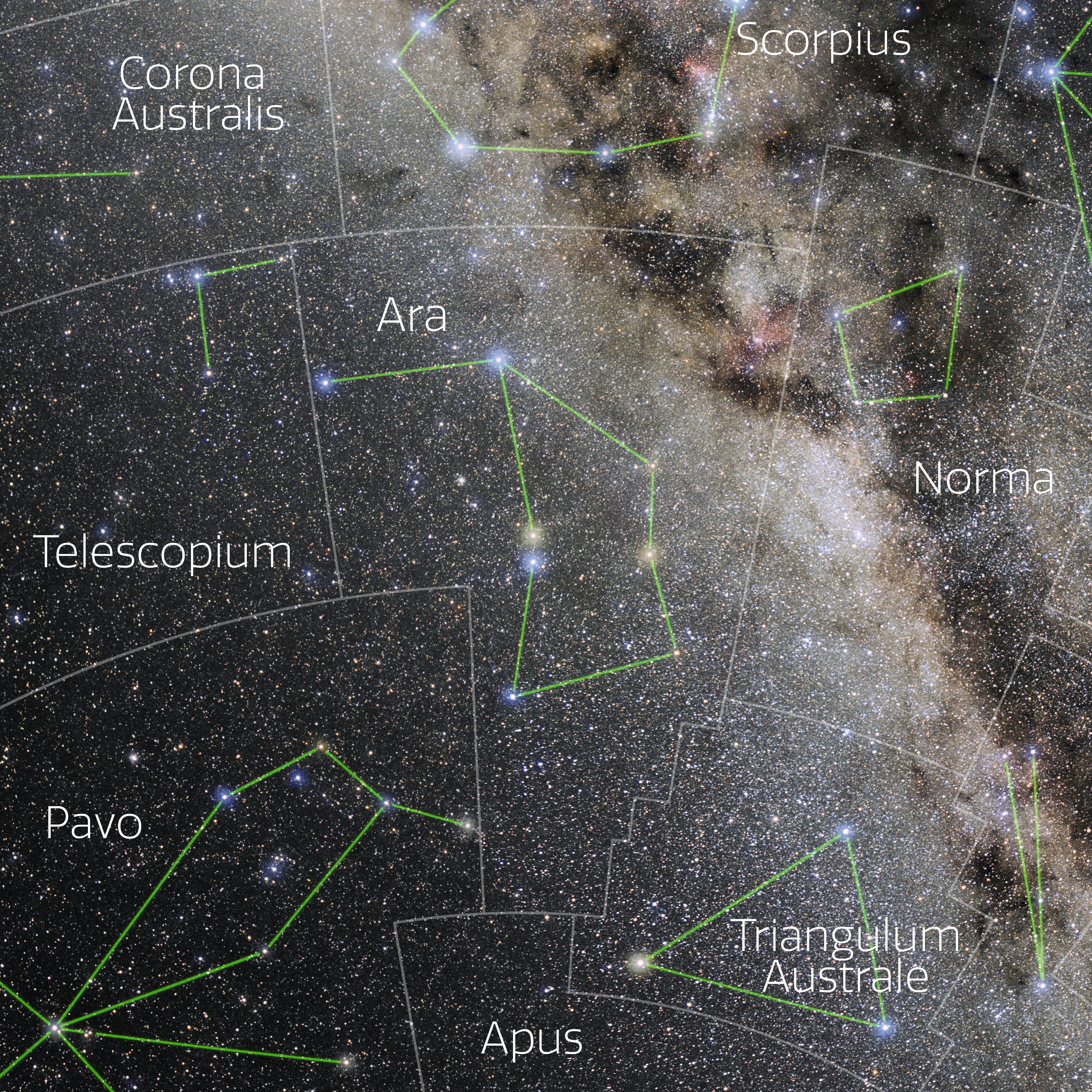
The constellation Ara showing the IAU boundaries, the constellation stick figure, and labels for its brightest stars. Astrophotograph by Eckhard Slawik, from NOIRLab's 88 Constellations project.

Alpha Arae is a blue-white main sequence star of magnitude 2.95, that is 270 ± 20 light-years from Earth. This star is around 9.6 times as massive as the Sun, and has an average of 4.5 times its radius. It is 5,800 times as luminous as the Sun, its energy emitted from its outer envelope at an effective temperature of 18,044 K. A Be star, Alpha Arae is surrounded by a dense equatorial disk of material in Keplerian (rather than uniform) rotation. The star is losing mass by a polar stellar wind with a terminal velocity of approximately 1,000 km/s.

The third brightest star in Ara at magnitude 3.13 is Zeta Arae, an orange giant of spectral type K3III that is located 490 ± 10 light-years from Earth. Around 7–8 times as massive as the Sun, it has swollen to a diameter around 114 times that of the Sun and is 3800 times as luminous. Were it not dimmer by intervening interstellar dust, it would be significantly brighter at magnitude 2.11.

Delta Arae is a blue-white main sequence star of spectral type B8Vn and magnitude 3.6, 198 ± 4 light-years from Earth. It is around 3.56 times as massive as the Sun.

Epsilon^{1} Arae is an orange giant of apparent magnitude 4.1, 360 ± 10 light-years distant from Earth. It is around 74% more massive than the Sun. At an age of about 1.7 billion years, the outer envelope of the star has expanded to almost 34 times the Sun's radius.

Eta Arae is an orange giant of apparent magnitude 3.76, located 299 ± 5 light-years distant from Earth. Estimated to be around five billion years old, it has reached the giant star stage of its evolution. With 1.12 times the mass of the Sun, it has an outer envelope that has expanded to 40 times the Sun's radius. The star is now spinning so slowly that it takes more than eleven years to complete a single rotation.

GX 339-4 (V821 Arae) is a moderately strong variable galactic low-mass X-ray binary (LMXB) source and black-hole candidate that flares from time to time. From spectroscopic measurements, the mass of the black-hole was found to be at least of 5.8 solar masses.

Exoplanets have been discovered in seven star systems in the constellation. Mu Arae (Cervantes) is a sunlike star that hosts four planets. HD 152079 is a sunlike star with a jupiter-like planet with an orbital period of 2097 ± 930 days. HD 154672 is an ageing sunlike star with a Hot Jupiter. HD 154857 is a sunlike star with one confirmed and one suspected planet. HD 156411 is a star hotter and larger than the sun with a gas giant planet in orbit. Gliese 674 is a nearby red dwarf star with a planet. Gliese 676 is a binary star system composed of two red dwarfs with four planets.

=== Deep-sky objects ===
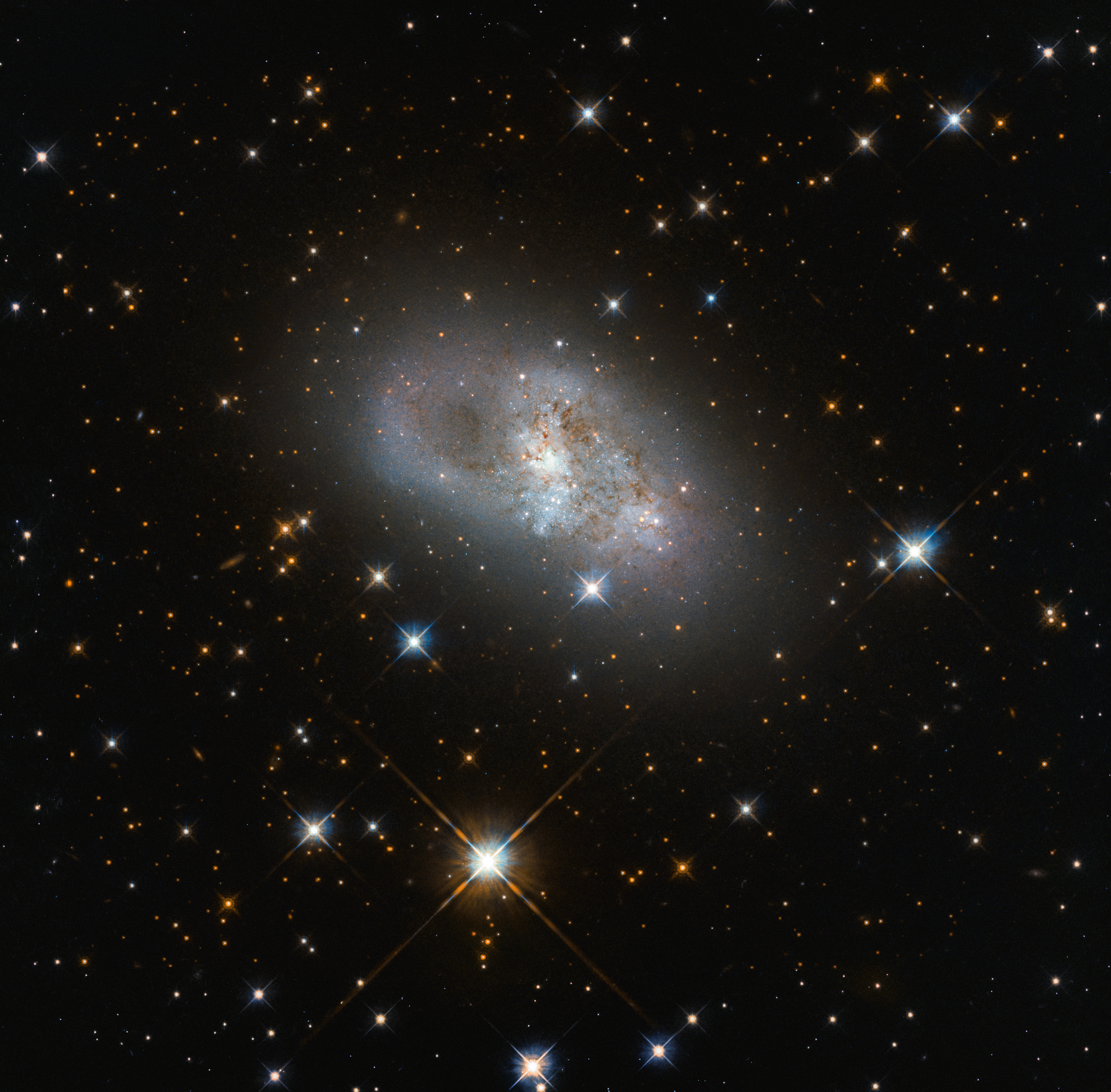
IC 4653 galaxy taken by Hubble.

The northwest corner of Ara is crossed by the galactic plane of the Milky Way and contains several open clusters (notably NGC 6200) and diffuse nebulae (including the bright cluster/nebula pair NGC 6188 and NGC 6193). The brightest of the globular clusters, sixth magnitude NGC 6397, lies at a distance of just 6,500 light-years (6.1×10^{16} km), making it one of the closest globular clusters to the Solar System.

Ara also contains Westerlund 1, a super star cluster containing itself the possible red supergiant Westerlund 1-237 and the red supergiant Westerlund 1-26. The latter is one of the largest stars known with an estimate varying between 1,168 R_{☉} and 2,519 R_{☉}.

Although Ara lies close to the heart of the Milky Way, two spiral galaxies (NGC 6215 and NGC 6221) are visible near star Eta Arae.

==== Open clusters ====
- NGC 6193 is an open cluster containing approximately 30 stars with an overall magnitude of 5.0 and a size of 0.25 square degrees, about half the size of the full Moon. It is approximately 4200 light-years from Earth. It has one bright member, a double star with a blue-white hued primary of magnitude 5.6 and a secondary of magnitude 6.9. NGC 6193 is surrounded by NGC 6188, a faint nebula only normally visible in long-exposure photographs.
- NGC 6200
- NGC 6204
- NGC 6208
- NGC 6250
- NGC 6253
- IC 4651

==== Globular clusters ====
- NGC 6352
- NGC 6362
- NGC 6397 is a globular cluster with an overall magnitude of 6.0; it is visible to the naked eye under exceptionally dark skies and is normally visible in binoculars. It is a fairly close globular cluster, at a distance of 10,500 light-years.

=== Planetary Nebulae ===
- The Stingray Nebula (Hen 3–1357), the youngest known planetary nebula as of 2010, formed in Ara; the light from its formation was first observable around 1987.
- NGC 6326. A planetary nebula that might have a binary system at its center.
- IC 1266. Also known as Thackeray 1 (Tc 1).

== Equivalents ==
In Chinese astronomy, the stars of the constellation Ara lie within The Azure Dragon of the East (東方青龍, Dōng Fāng Qīng Lóng). Five stars of Ara formed Guī (龜), a tortoise, while another three formed Chǔ (杵), a pestle.

The Wardaman people of the Northern Territory in Australia saw the stars of Ara and the neighbouring constellation Pavo as flying foxes.

== Bibliography ==
- Dunlop, Storm (2005). Atlas of the Night Sky. Collins. ISBN 978-0-00-717223-8.
- Ridpath, Ian; Tirion, Wil (2001). Stars and Planets Guide. Princeton University Press. ISBN 978-0-691-08913-3.
- Ridpath, Ian; Tirion, Wil (2007). Stars and Planets Guide (4th ed.). Princeton University Press. ISBN 978-0-691-13556-4.
- Staal, Julius D.W. (1988). The New Patterns in the Sky. McDonald and Woodward Publishing Company. ISBN 978-0-939923-04-5.
- Wagman, Morton (2003). Lost Stars: Lost, Missing and Troublesome Stars from the Catalogues of Johannes Bayer, Nicholas Louis de Lacaille, John Flamsteed, and Sundry Others. Blacksburg, VA: The McDonald & Woodward Publishing Company. ISBN 978-0-939923-78-6.

Online sources

- "AEEA (Activities of Exhibition and Education in Astronomy) 天文教育資訊網 2006 年 7 月 1 日" (in Chinese). 2006.
- Ridpath, Ian. "Ara". Star Tales.
