= List of discoverers of Messier objects =

This is a list of each Messier object, its discovery year and its first discoverer who published/recorded their findings. Most of the Messier Objects were discovered between the years 1654 and 1782 AD, amongst some outliers.

Messier object	Discoverer	Year
Messier 1	John Bevis	1731
Messier 2	Jean-Dominique Maraldi	1746
Messier 3	Charles Messier	1764
Messier 4	Philippe Loys de Chéseaux	1745
Messier 5	Gottfried Kirch	1702
Messier 6	Giovanni Battista Hodierna	1654
Messier 7	Claudius Ptolemy	130
Messier 8	Giovanni Battista Hodierna	1654
Messier 9	Charles Messier	1764
Messier 10	Charles Messier	1764
Messier 11	Charles Messier	1764
Messier 12	Charles Messier	1764
Messier 13	Edmond Halley	1714
Messier 14	Charles Messier	1764
Messier 15	Jean-Dominique Maraldi	1746
Messier 16	Philippe Loys de Chéseaux	1745-6
Messier 17	Philippe Loys de Chéseaux	1745
Messier 18	Charles Messier	1764
Messier 19	Charles Messier	1764
Messier 20	Charles Messier	1764
Messier 21	Charles Messier	1764
Messier 22	Johann Abraham Ihle	1665
Messier 23	Charles Messier	1764
Messier 24	Charles Messier	1764
Messier 25	Philippe Loys de Chéseaux	1745
Messier 26	Charles Messier	1764
Messier 27	Charles Messier	1764
Messier 28	Charles Messier	1764
Messier 29	Charles Messier	1764
Messier 30	Charles Messier	1764
Messier 31	Al-Sufi	964 (Note: M 31 is visible to the naked eye, however Al-Sufi was the first know person to make note of the object. It would not be observed with a telescope until 1612, by Simon Marius.)
Messier 32	Guillaume Le Gentil	1749
Messier 33	Giovanni Battista Hodierna	1654
Messier 34	Giovanni Battista Hodierna	1654
Messier 35	Philippe Loys de Chéseaux	1745
Messier 36	Giovanni Battista Hodierna	1654
Messier 37	Charles Messier	1764
Messier 38	Giovanni Battista Hodierna	1654
Messier 39	Guillaume Le Gentil	1749
Messier 40	Charles Messier	1764
Messier 41	Giovanni Battista Hodierna	1654
Messier 42	Nicolas-Claude Fabri de Peiresc	1610
Messier 43	Jean-Jacques d'Ortous de Mairan	1731
Messier 44	Galileo Galilei	1609
Messier 45	Galileo Galilei	1610
Messier 46	Charles Messier	1771
Messier 47	Giovanni Battista Hodierna	1654
Messier 48	Charles Messier	1771
Messier 49	Charles Messier	1777
Messier 50	Giovanni Domenico Cassini	1711
Messier 51	Charles Messier	1773
Messier 52	Charles Messier	1774
Messier 53	Johann Elert Bode	1775
Messier 54	Charles Messier	1778
Messier 55	Nicolas Louis de Lacaille	1752
Messier 56	Charles Messier	1779
Messier 57	Charles Messier	1779
Messier 58	Charles Messier	1779
Messier 59	Johann Gottfried Koehler	1779
Messier 60	Johann Gottfried Koehler	1779
Messier 61	Barnaba Oriani	1779
Messier 62	Charles Messier	1772
Messier 63	Pierre Méchain	1779
Messier 64	Edward Pigott	1779
Messier 65	Charles Messier	1780
Messier 66	Charles Messier	1780
Messier 67	Johann Gottfried Koehler	1779
Messier 68	Charles Messier	1780
Messier 69	Charles Messier	1780
Messier 70	Charles Messier	1780
Messier 71	Philippe Loys de Chéseaux	1745
Messier 72	Pierre Méchain	1781
Messier 73	Charles Messier	1781
Messier 74	Pierre Méchain	1780
Messier 75	Pierre Méchain	1780
Messier 76	Pierre Méchain	1780
Messier 77	Pierre Méchain	1780
Messier 78	Pierre Méchain	1780
Messier 79	Pierre Méchain	1780
Messier 80	Charles Messier	1781
Messier 81	Johann Elert Bode	1774
Messier 82	Johann Elert Bode	1774
Messier 83	Nicolas Louis de Lacaille	1752
Messier 84	Charles Messier	1781
Messier 85	Pierre Méchain	1781
Messier 86	Charles Messier	1781
Messier 87	Charles Messier	1781
Messier 88	Charles Messier	1781
Messier 89	Charles Messier	1781
Messier 90	Charles Messier	1781
Messier 91	Charles Messier	1781
Messier 92	Johann Elert Bode	1777
Messier 93	Charles Messier	1781
Messier 94	Pierre Méchain	1781
Messier 95	Pierre Méchain	1781
Messier 96	Pierre Méchain	1781
Messier 97	Pierre Méchain	1781
Messier 98	Pierre Méchain	1781
Messier 99	Pierre Méchain	1781
Messier 100	Pierre Méchain	1781
Messier 101	Pierre Méchain	1781
Messier 102	Pierre Méchain	1781
Messier 103	Pierre Méchain	1781
Messier 104	Pierre Méchain	1781
Messier 105	Pierre Méchain	1781
Messier 106	Pierre Méchain	1781
Messier 107	Pierre Méchain	1782
Messier 108	Pierre Méchain	1782
Messier 109	Pierre Méchain	1781
Messier 110	Charles Messier	1773
