= Carina–Sagittarius Arm =

Minor spiral arm of the Milky Way Galaxy and one of its most pronounced arms

Observed structure of the Milky Way's spiral arms

The Carina–Sagittarius Arm (also known as the Sagittarius Arm or Sagittarius–Carina Arm, labeled -I) is generally thought to be a minor spiral arm of the Milky Way galaxy. Each spiral arm is a long, diffuse curving streamer of stars that radiates from the Galactic Center. These gigantic structures are often composed of billions of stars and thousands of gas clouds. The Carina–Sagittarius Arm is one of the most pronounced arms in our galaxy as many HII regions, young stars and giant molecular clouds are concentrated in it.

The Milky Way is a barred spiral galaxy, consisting of a central crossbar and bulge from which two major and several minor spiral arms radiate outwards. This arm lies between two major spiral arms, the Scutum–Centaurus Arm, the near part of which is visible looking inward, i.e. toward the Galactic Center with the rest beyond the galactic central bulge, and the Perseus Arm, similar in size and shape but locally much closer looking outward, away from the bright, immediately obvious extent of the Milky Way in a perfect observational sky. It is named for its proximity to the constellations Sagittarius and Carina as seen in the night sky from Earth, in the direction of the Galactic Center.

The arm dissipates near its middle, shortly after reaching its maximal angle, viewed from the Solar System, from the Galactic Center of about 80°. Extending from the galaxy's central bar is the Sagittarius Arm (Sagittarius bar). Beyond the dissipated zone it is the Carina Arm.

== Geometry ==
A study was done with the measured parallaxes and motions of 10 regions in the Sagittarius arm where massive stars are formed. Data was gathered using the BeSSeL Survey with the VLBA, and the results were synthesized to discover the physical properties of these sections (called the Galactocentric azimuth, around −2 and 65 degrees). The results were that the spiral pitch angle of the arms is 7.3 ± 1.5 degrees, and the half-width of the arms of the Milky Way were found to be 0.2 kpc. The nearest part to the Sun is around 1.4 ± 0.2 kpc away.

== Minor arm ==
In 2008, infrared observations with the Spitzer Space Telescope showed that the Carina–Sagittarius Arm has a relative paucity of young stars, in contrast with the Scutum-Centaurus Arm and Perseus Arm. This suggests that the Carina–Sagittarius Arm is a minor arm, along with the Norma Arm (Outer Arm). These two appear to be mostly concentrations of gas, sparsely sprinkled with pockets of newly formed stars.

== Visible objects ==
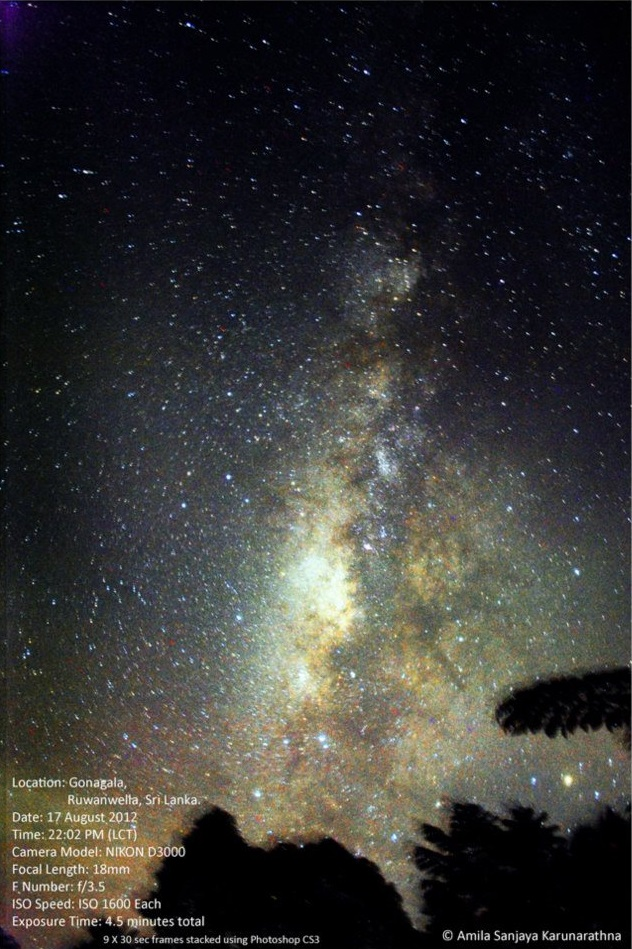
In front of, above and below the Galactic Center much visible dust appears from the Scutum-Centaurus Arm, some dust and nebulae in the Sagittarius Arm and many stars and objects from our own arm.

A number of Messier objects and other objects visible through an amateur's telescope or binoculars are found in the Sagittarius Arm (here listed approximately in order from east to west along the arm):

- M11, the Wild Duck Cluster in Scutum (RA 18h 51m)
- Open Cluster M26 in Scutum (RA 18h 45m)
- M16, the Eagle Nebula in Serpens (RA 18h 19m)
- M17, the Omega Nebula in Sagittarius (RA 18h 20.4m)
- Open Cluster M18 in Sagittarius (RA 18h 19.9m)
- Globular Cluster M55 in Sagittarius (RA 19h 40m)
- M24, the Small Sagittarius Star Cloud (RA 18h 17m)
- Open Cluster M21 in Sagittarius (RA 18h 5m)
- M8, the Lagoon Nebula in Sagittarius (RA 18h 4m)
- NGC 3372, the Carina Nebula in Carina (RA 10h 45m)

== See also ==
- Galactic disc
