= Perseus Arm =

One of two major spiral arms of the Milky Way galaxy

Observed structure of the Milky Way's spiral arms.

The Perseus Arm is one of two major spiral arms of the Milky Way galaxy. The second major arm is called the Scutum–Centaurus Arm. The Perseus Arm begins from the distal end of the long Milky Way central bar. Previously thought to be 13,000 light-years away from Earth, research published in 2005 has suggested that it is less than half that distance, estimated at 6,400 light years, from the Solar System.

== Overview ==
The Milky Way is a barred spiral galaxy with two major arms and a number of minor arms or spurs. The Perseus Spiral Arm, with a radius of approximately 10.7 kiloparsecs, is located between the minor Cygnus and Carina–Sagittarius Arms. It is named after the constellation Perseus in which it lies as seen from Earth.

Scientists in two large radio astronomy projects – the Japanese VLBI Exploration of Radio Astrometry (VERA), which launched its efforts in 2001, and the Bar and Spiral Structure Legacy (BeSSeL) Survey, which launched its efforts in 2010, – made great efforts over about 20 years to measure the trigonometric parallaxes toward about 200 water vapor (H_{2}O) and methanol (CH_{3}OH) masers in massive star-forming regions in the Milky Way. They have employed these parallax measurements to delineate the forms of spiral arms from the Galactic longitude 2 to 240 degrees and extended the spiral arm traces into the portion of the Milky Way seen from the Southern Hemisphere using tangencies along some arms based on carbon monoxide emission. The image clearly presents the Milky Way as a barred spiral galaxy with fairly symmetric four major arms and some extra arm segments and spurs.

The Perseus Arm is one of the four major arms. The arm is more than 60 kpc long and about 1 kpc wide, and the spiral extension in the pitch angle is around 9 degrees.

There is speculation that the local spur known as the Orion–Cygnus Arm, which includes the Solar System and Earth and is located inside of the Perseus Arm, or is a branch of it, but this is unconfirmed.

The Perseus Arm contains the Double Cluster and a number of Messier objects:

- The Crab Nebula (M1)
- Open Cluster M36
- Open Cluster M37
- Open Cluster M38
- Open Cluster M52
- Open Cluster M103.

== See also ==
- Galactic disc
- List of Messier objects
