= Messier 91 =

Galaxy in the constellation Coma Berenices

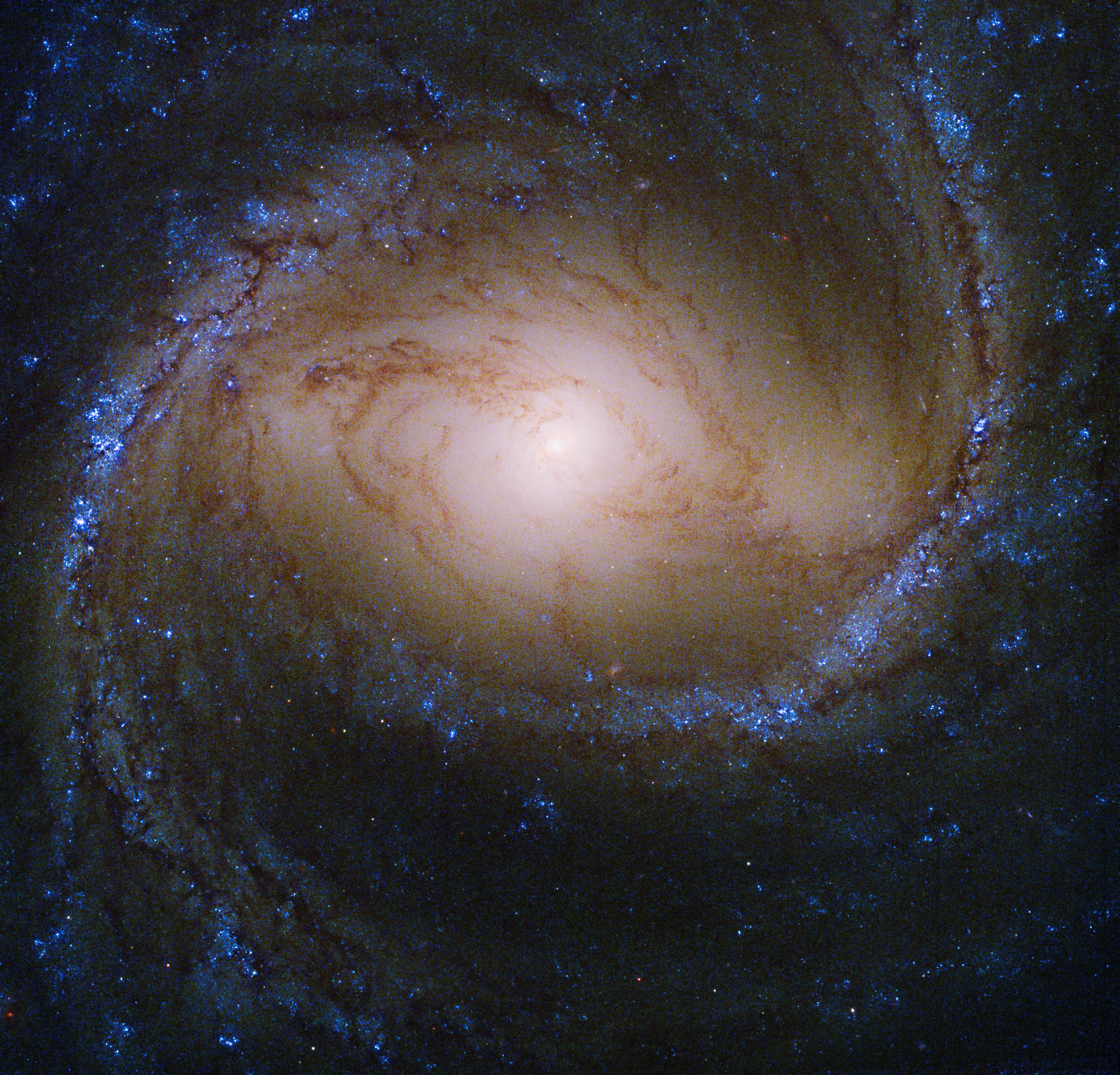
- Spiral Galaxy Messier 91 imaged by the Hubble Space Telescope

Observation data (J2000 epoch)
- Constellation: Coma Berenices
- Right ascension: 12^{h} 35^{m} 26.4^{s}
- Declination: +14° 29′ 47″
- Redshift: 486 ± 4 km/s
- Distance: 63 ± 16 Mly (19 ± 5 Mpc)
- Apparent magnitude (V): 10.2

Characteristics
- Type: SBb(rs)
- Size: 105,500 ly (32.36 kpc) (estimated)
- Apparent size (V): 5.4′ × 4.3′

Other designations
- NGC 4548, UGC 7753, PGC 41934

Messier 91 (also known as NGC 4548 or M91) is a barred spiral galaxy that is found in the south of Coma Berenices. It is in the local supercluster and is part of the Virgo Cluster of galaxies. It is about 63 million light-years away from the Milky Way. It was the last of a group of eight "nebulae" – the term 'galaxy' only coming into use for these objects once it was realized in the 20th century that they were extragalactic – discovered by Charles Messier in 1781. It is the faintest object in the Messier catalog, with an apparent magnitude of 10.2.

As a result of a bookkeeping error by Messier, M91 was for a long time one of the few missing entries in the Messier catalog, not matching any known object in the sky. It was not until 1969 that amateur astronomer William C. Williams realized that M91 was NGC 4548, which was catalogued by William Herschel in 1784. Some sources contend the nearby spiral galaxy NGC 4571 was considered as a candidate for this object by Herschel.

== Observation history ==
The object was discovered in 1781 (Note: on March 18) by Messier who described it as nebula without stars, fainter than M90. Messier mistakenly logged its position from Messier 58, where in fact it should have been Messier 89. William Herschel observed the same object in 1784. (Note: On April 8)

In 1969 Williams solved this lost Messier object by measuring its right ascension and declination relative to those of the nearby galaxy M89 (notable reference stars angularly nearby are sparse) – rather than M58, a 9th-magnitude galaxy which Messier recorded in 1778. This amended night sky "star-hopping" reference point matches Messier's figures to 0.1 of an arcminute (′) in right ascension and 1′ in declination, a sixtieth of a degree.

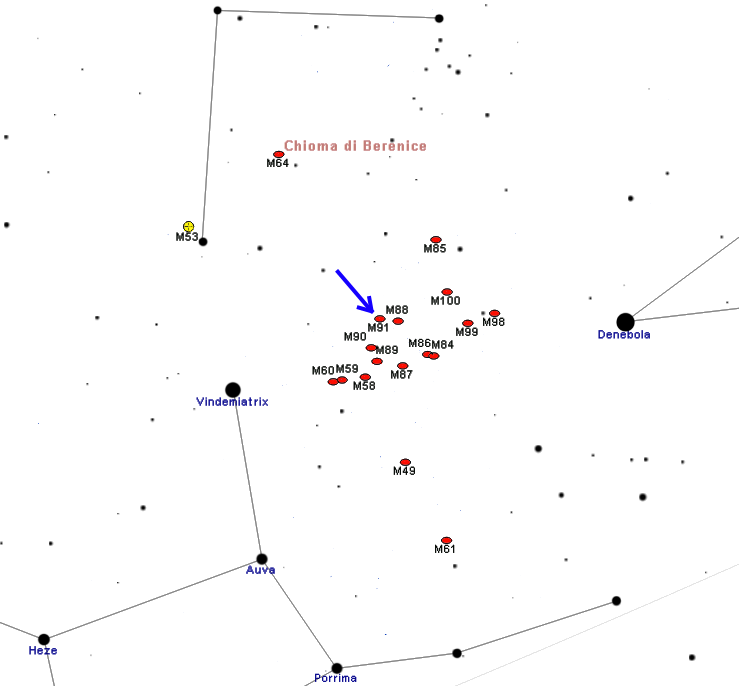
Location of M91

== Features ==
Inclusion of Messier 91 in the Virgo cluster was confirmed in 1997 from observing Cepheid variables which place it at 52±6 million light years away.

M91 can be amongst the most difficult of Messier objects to find and view "M91 is big, with reasonably high total brightness but pretty low surface brightness. Its large size makes it prominent under dark skies, where the lowish surface brightness is a non-issue. It can be quite challenging to spot in light-polluted skies. M91 is right up there with M33, M74, and M101 as a candidate for most difficult Messier object under suburban skies."

When found and viewed, Its bar is conspicuous – it is seen with position angle of 65 to 245 degrees when being measured from the North direction to the East.

There is a countering peculiar (local) velocity toward us through the Virgo cluster of about 700 km/s within the cluster's recession velocity of about 1100 km/s, which produces its observed recessional velocity of only about 400 km/s.

Messier 91 is also classified as an anemic galaxy, that is: a spiral galaxy with little star formation and gas compared with other galaxies of its type.

== See also ==
- List of Messier objects
