= Messier 108 =

Galaxy in the constellation Ursa Major

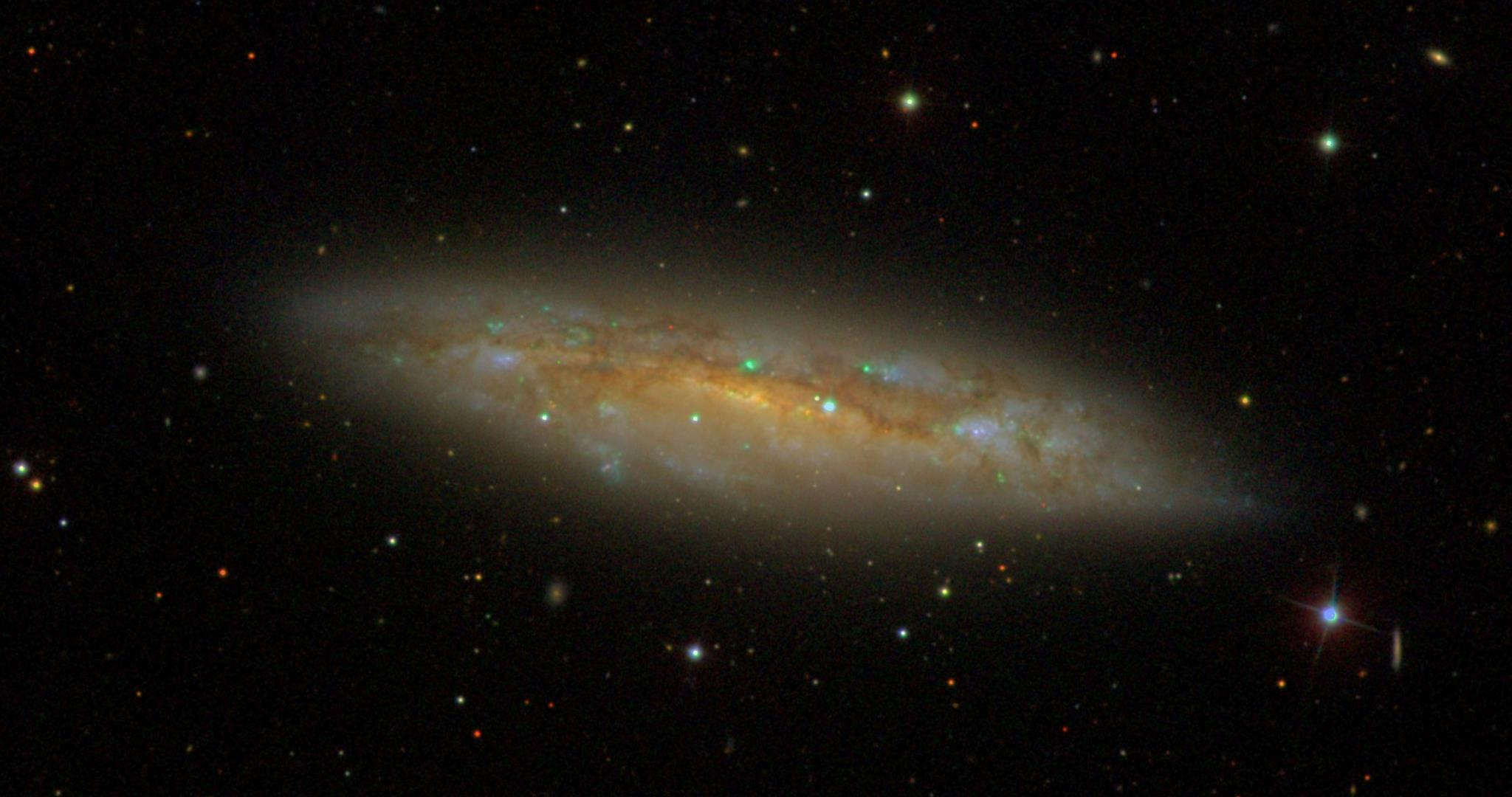
- M108 imaged by the Sloan Digital Sky Survey

Observation data (J2000 epoch)
- Constellation: Ursa Major
- Right ascension: 11^{h} 11^{m} 31.0^{s}
- Declination: +55° 40′ 27″
- Redshift: 696.1 ± 0.6 km/s
- Distance: 14.1 Mpc (46 Mly)
- Apparent magnitude (V): 10.0

Characteristics
- Type: SB(s)cd
- Apparent size (V): 8′.7 × 2′.2

Other designations
- NGC 3556, PGC 34030, UGC 6225

Messier 108 (also known as NGC 3556, nicknamed the Surfboard Galaxy) is a barred spiral galaxy about 46 million light-years away from Earth in the northern constellation Ursa Major. It was discovered by Pierre Méchain in 1781 or 1782. From the Earth, this galaxy is seen almost edge-on.

This galaxy is an isolated member of the Ursa Major Cloud of galaxies in the local supercluster. It has a morphological classification of type SBbc in the de Vaucouleurs system, which means it is a barred spiral galaxy with somewhat loosely wound arms. The maximum angular size of the galaxy in the optical band is 11′.1 × 4′.6, and it is inclined 75° to the line of sight.

This galaxy has an estimated mass of 125 billion solar masses (M_{☉}) (Note: Using an assumed distance of 7.1 Megaparsec to Messier 108, based on a 1986 study.) and bears about 290 ± 80 globular clusters. Examination of the distribution of neutral hydrogen in this galaxy shows discrete shells of expanding gas extending for several kiloparsecs, known as H1 supershells. These may be driven by currents of dark matter, dust and gas contributing to large star formation, having caused supernovae explosions. Alternatively they may result from an infall from the intergalactic medium or arise from radio jets.

Observations with the Chandra X-ray Observatory have identified 83 X-ray sources, including a source at the nucleus. The brightest of these is consistent with an intermediate-mass black hole accreting matter. The galaxy is also emitting a diffuse soft X-ray radiation within 2.6 arcminutes of the optical galaxy. (Note: This is the angular size of the feature as it appears on the sky. The physical size depends on the distance to Messier 108, which is more difficult to measure. At the time of the study that discovered this feature (in 2003), the accepted distance to Messier 108 was based on a 1988 work, which gave a value of 14.1 Megaparsec (Mpc). This has been substantially revised down to 8.8 Mpc in a 2014 study. At 14.1 Mpc, an angular size of 2.6 arcminutes would correspond to a physical size of $2.6/60 \cdot \pi/180 \cdot 14100=10.7$ kpc, or roughly 10 kiloparsec (kpc), which is the value given in the 2003 study. Using the more recent distance estimate, this would be $2.6/60 \cdot \pi/180 \cdot 8800=6.7$ kpc. Compare the list of distance measurements in the NASA/IPAC Extragalactic Database.) The spectrum of the source at the core is consistent with an active galactic nucleus, but an examination with the Spitzer Space Telescope showed no indication of activity. The supermassive black hole at the core has an estimated mass of 24 million solar masses (M_{☉}).

== Supernovae ==
Four supernovae have been observed in M108:

- SN 1969B (type unknown, mag. 16) was discovered by Paul Wild on 6 February 1969, and independently by Balázs on 10 February 1969. It reached a brightness of mag. 13.9.
- SPIRITS 16tn was discovered by the Spitzer Space Telescope in August 2016. The supernova was only visible in infrared light, because it was heavily obscured by dust. Its extinction was estimated to be 8–9 mag, making it one of the most heavily obscured supernovae ever observed.
- SN 2023dbc (Type Ic, mag. 17) was discovered by the Zwicky Transient Facility on 13 March 2023. 2023dbc is likely a stripped-envelope supernova as there is no evidence for hydrogen in these spectra beyond narrow emission associated with the underlying HII region. It is among the nearest Type Ic supernovae discovered to date.
- SN 2025ahqr (Type Iax[02cx-like], mag. 20.0269) was discovered by the Zwicky Transient Facility on 23 November 2025. It is highly reddened, suggesting that it is strongly extincted by dust. At the time of discovery, it is the closest low luminosity Type Iax supernova known.

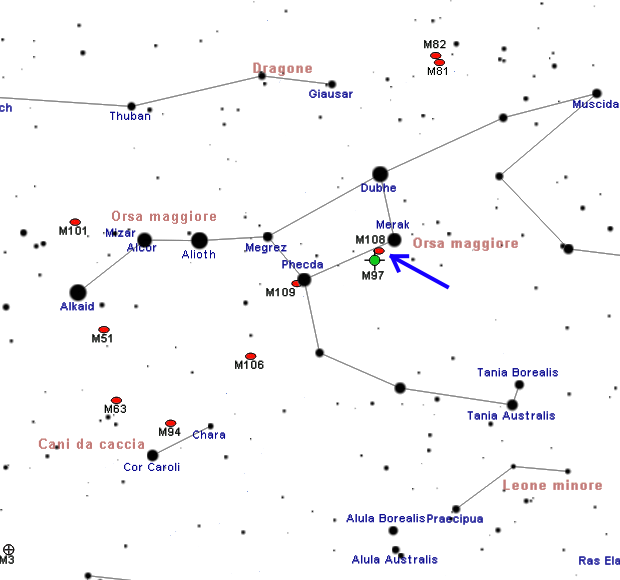
Location of M108

== See also ==
- List of Messier objects
- NGC 2403 - a similar spiral galaxy
- NGC 4631 - a similar spiral galaxy
- NGC 7793 - a similar spiral galaxy
