= Messier 98 =

Intermediate spiral galaxy in the constellation Coma Berenices

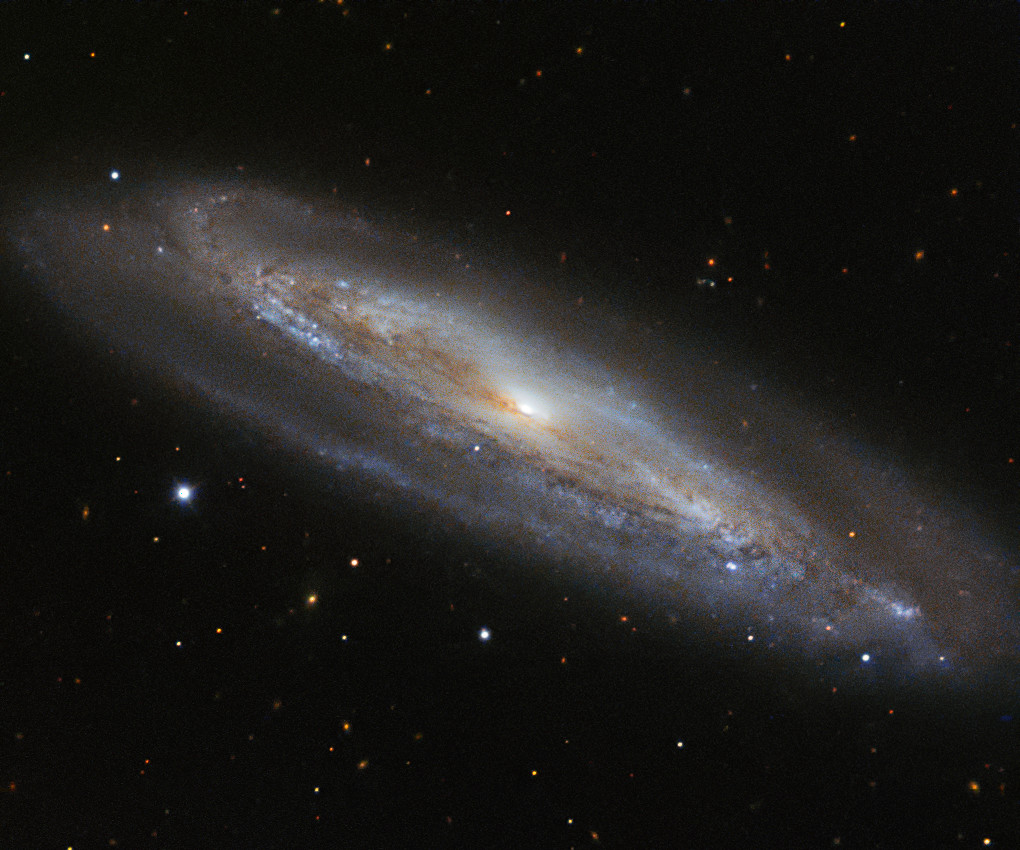
- Galaxy Messier 98 by ESO New Technology Telescope

Observation data (J2000 epoch)
- Constellation: Coma Berenices
- Right ascension: 12^{h} 13^{m} 48.292^{s}
- Declination: +14° 54′ 01.69″
- Redshift: −0.000474
- Heliocentric radial velocity: −142 ± 4 km/s
- Distance: 44.4 million light years (13.6 Mpc)
- Apparent magnitude (V): 10.1

Characteristics
- Type: SAB(s)ab
- Apparent size (V): 9′.8 × 2′.8

Other designations
- NGC 4192, UGC 7231, PGC 39028

Messier 98, M98 or NGC 4192 is an intermediate spiral galaxy about 44.4 million light-years away in slightly northerly Coma Berenices, about 6° to the east of the bright star Denebola (Beta Leonis). It was discovered by French astronomer Pierre Méchain on 1781, (Note: 15 March) along with nearby M99 and M100, and was catalogued by compatriot Charles Messier 29 days later in his Catalogue des Nébuleuses & des amas d'Étoiles. It has a blueshift, denoting ignoring of its fast other movement (vectors of proper motion), it is approaching at about 140 km/s.

The morphological classification of this galaxy is SAB(s)ab, which indicates it is a spiral galaxy that displays mixed barred and non-barred features with intermediate to tightly wound arms and no ring. It is highly inclined to the line of sight at an angle of 74° and has a maximum rotation velocity of 236 km/s. The combined mass of the stars in this galaxy is an estimated 76 billion (7.6 × 10^{10}) times the mass of the Sun. It contains about 4.3 billion solar masses of neutral hydrogen and 85 million solar masses in dust. The nucleus is active, displaying characteristics of a "transition" type object. That is, it shows properties of a LINER-type galaxy intermixed with an H II region around the nucleus.

Messier 98 is a member of the Virgo Cluster, which is a large cluster of galaxies, part of the local supercluster.

About 750 million years ago, it may have interacted with the large spiral galaxy Messier 99. These are now separated by 1,300,000 ly (400,000 pc).

== See also ==
- List of Messier objects
- Messier 86, another blueshifted galaxy
