= Messier 107 =

Globular cluster in Ophiuchus

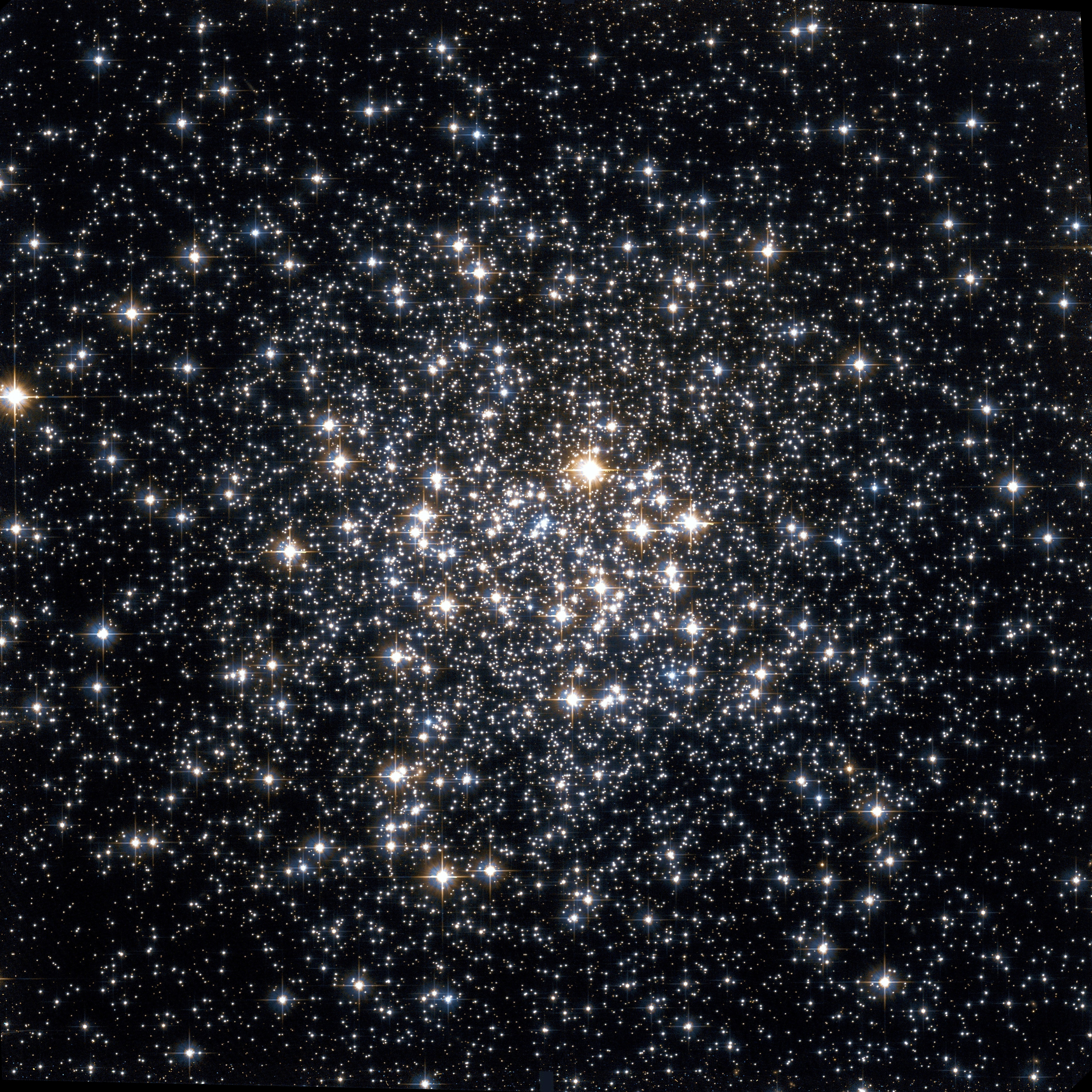
- M107 from Hubble Space Telescope; 3.5′ view

Observation data (J2000 epoch)
- Class: X
- Right ascension: 16^{h} 32^{m} 31.86^{s}
- Declination: –13° 03′ 13.6″
- Distance: 20.9 kly (6.4 kpc)
- Apparent magnitude (V): 7.9
- Apparent dimensions (V): 10′

Physical characteristics
- Mass: 1.82×10^{5} M_{☉}
- Radius: 30 ly
- Metallicity: [Fe/H] = –0.95 dex
- Estimated age: 13.95 Gyr
- Other designations: C 1629-129, GCl 44, M 107, NGC 6171

Messier 107 or M107, also known as NGC 6171 or the Crucifix Cluster, is a very loose globular cluster close to the equator in Ophiuchus, and is the last such object in the Messier Catalogue.

== Observational history, namings and guide ==
It was discovered by Pierre Méchain in April 1782, then independently by William Herschel in 1793. Herschel's son, John, in his 1864 General Catalogue, described it as a "globular cluster of stars, large, very rich, very much compressed, round, well resolved, clearly consisting of stars". It was not until 1947 that Helen Sawyer Hogg added it and three other objects found by Méchain to the modern Catalogue, the latter having contributed several of the suggested observation objects which Messier had verified and added. The cluster is to be found 2.5° south and slightly west of the star Zeta Ophiuchi.

== Properties ==
M107 is close to the galactic plane and about 20,900 light-years from Earth and 9,800 ly (3,000 pc) from the Galactic Center. Its orbit is partly as far out as the galactic halo, as is between 9,200–12,400 ly (2,820–3,790 pc) from the Galactic Center, the lower figure, the "perigalactic distance" sees it enter and leave the galactic bar. There are 22 known RR Lyrae variable stars in this cluster and a probable SX Phoenicis variable.

== See also ==
- List of Messier objects
