= Messier 29 =

Open cluster in the constellation Cygnus

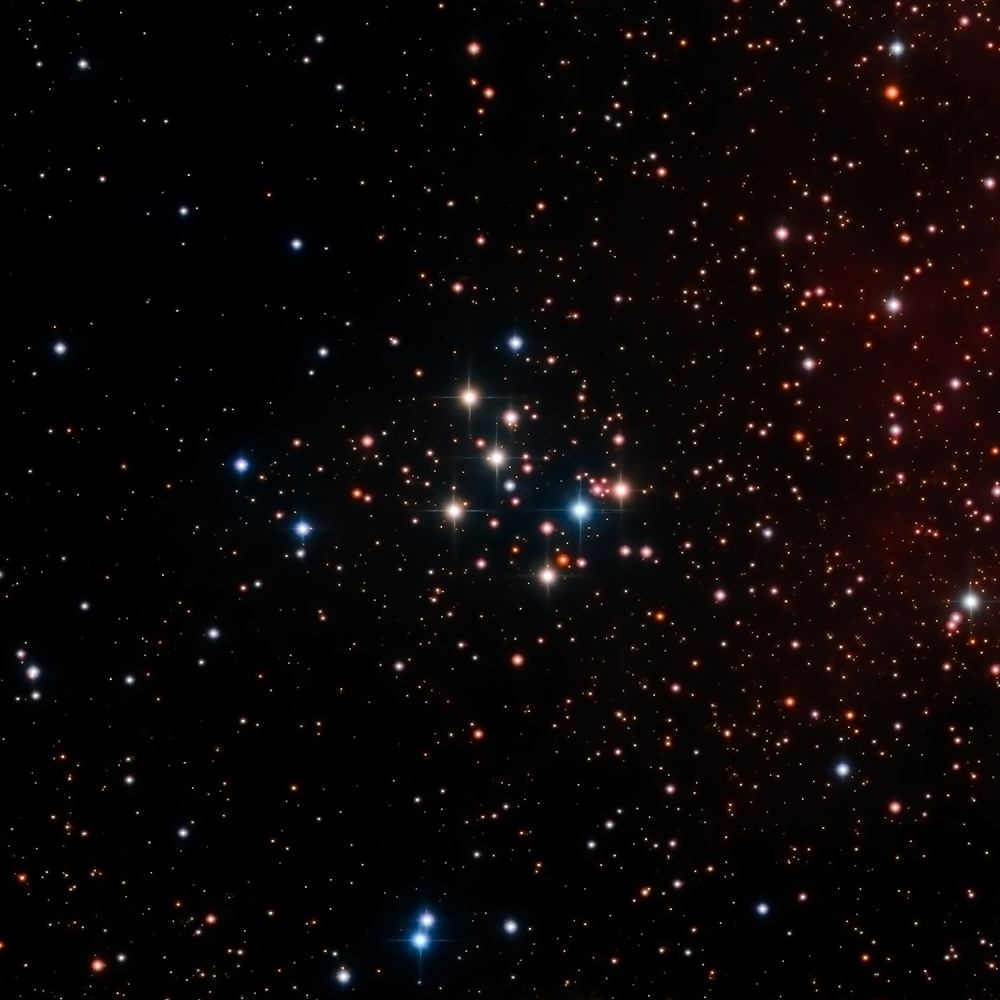
- Open cluster Messier 29 in Cygnus, conventionally taken (as looking at the object on the southern horizon). Very broad reddish nebulosity is noticeable to the west.

Observation data (J2000 epoch)
- Right ascension: 20^{h} 23^{m} 56^{s}
- Declination: +38° 31′ 24″
- Distance: 5,240 ly (1,608 pc)
- Apparent magnitude (V): 7.1
- Apparent dimensions (V): 7.0′

Physical characteristics
- Mass: 580–1,090 M_{☉}
- Estimated age: 13.2 Myr
- Other designations: M29, NGC 6913, Cr 422, OCl 168

Associations
- Constellation: Cygnus

Messier 29 or M29, also known as NGC 6913 or the Cooling Tower Cluster, is a quite small, bright open cluster of stars just south of the central bright star Gamma Cygni of a northerly zone of the sky, Cygnus. It was discovered by Charles Messier in 1764, and can be seen from Earth by using binoculars.

M29 is well within the several degrees of the arms and bulge of the Milky Way. It is at least many hundreds of light years short of the yardstick distance to the Galactic Center, as is between 4,000 and 7,200 light years away. A 1998 popular work gives a value within this range. (Note: Namely 6000 light years) Data from Gaia EDR3 gives a parallactic distance of about 5,240 light years. The uncertainty is due to poorly known absorption of the cluster's light. Its extinction greatly is from faint surrounding nebulosity and other foreground interstellar matter of this cross-section of the spiral arms (see Orion–Cygnus Arm, which is our local arm).

According to the Sky Catalogue, M29 is included in the Cygnus OB1 association, and the radial velocity component of three-dimensional motion, by default factoring in the solar system's current trajectory, is one of approaching at 28 km/s (noted, thus, as negative). Its age is estimated at 10 million years, as its five hottest stars are all giants of spectral class B0. Kepple and his associates give the apparent brightness of the brightest star as eighth magnitude of in the mid-wavelength (and frequency) "visual" band. (Note: Specifically at a V-band magnitude of 8.59)

The cluster's absolute magnitude is estimated at −8.2, a luminosity of 160,000 solar luminosities (L_{☉}). The linear diameter was estimated at only 11 light years. Its Trumpler class is III,3,p,n (as it is associated with nebulosity), although Götz gives, differently, II,3,m, and Kepple gives I,2,m,n. The Sky Catalogue lists it with 50 member stars; earlier Becvar estimated 20 members.

North of 47 degrees north, the cluster is for part or all of the day above the horizon. It can be made out in binoculars in a good sky. In telescopes, lowest powers are best. The brightest of its stars form a "stubby dipper", per Mallas. The four brightest stars form a quadrilateral, and another set a small triangle just north of the northernmost of the four. It is often known as the "cooling tower" due to its resemblance to the hyperboloid-shaped structures. A few fainter stars are around them, but the cluster appears quite isolated, especially in smaller telescopes. In photographs, many faint Milky Way background stars appear.

Messier 29 can be found quite easily as it is about 1.7 degrees south (Note: Specifically -by-east) of Gamma or 37 Cygni (Sadr). Angularly close, and almost certainly nearby in space, is diffuse nebulosity.

The especially hot binary Wolf–Rayet star WR 143 (WC4+Be) (HD 195177) can be found near this cluster.

== See also ==
- List of Messier objects
