= Messier 58 =

Galaxy in the constellation Virgo

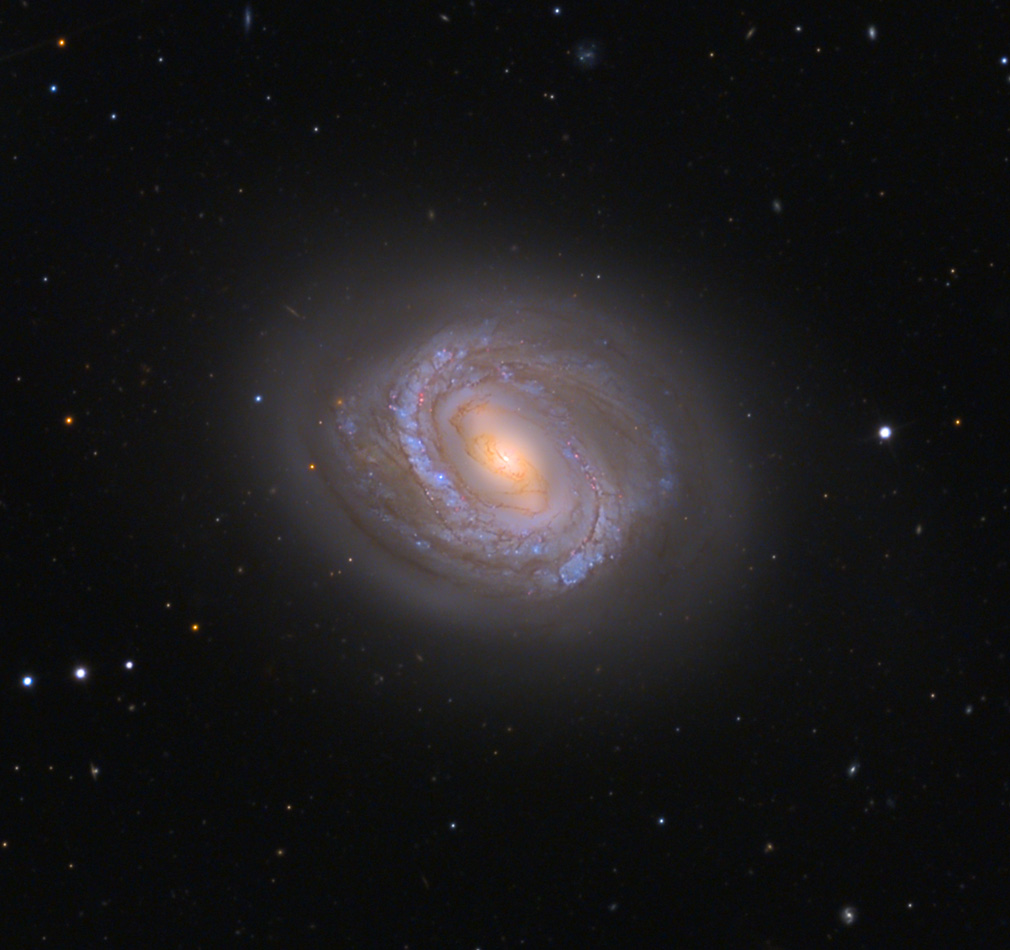

Observation data (J2000 epoch)
- Constellation: Virgo
- Right ascension: 12^{h} 37^{m} 43.522^{s}
- Declination: +11° 49′ 05.498″
- Redshift: 0.00506
- Heliocentric radial velocity: 1517 ± 1 km/s
- Distance: 21 megaparsecs (68 million light-years)
- Apparent magnitude (V): 9.7

Characteristics
- Type: SAB(rs)b; LINER Sy 1.9
- Size: 40.72 kiloparsecs (133,000 light-years) diameter; 2MASS K-band total isophote
- Apparent size (V): 5.9′ × 4.7′

Other designations
- NGC 4579, UGC 7796, PGC 42168, VCC 1727, GC 3121

Messier 58 (also known as M58 and NGC 4579) is an intermediate barred spiral galaxy with a weak inner ring structure located within the constellation Virgo, approximately 68 million light-years away from Earth. It was discovered by Charles Messier on April 15, 1779 and is one of four barred spiral galaxies that appear in Messier's catalogue. (Note: The other barred spiral galaxies in Messier's catalogue are Messier 91, Messier 95 and Messier 109) M58 is one of the brightest galaxies in the Virgo Cluster. From 1779 it was arguably (though unknown at that time) the farthest known astronomical object until the release of the New General Catalogue in the 1880s and even more so the publishing of redshift values in the 1920s.

== Early observations ==
Charles Messier discovered Messier 58, along with the elliptical galaxies Messier 59 and Messier 60, on April 15, 1779. M58 was reported on the chart of the Comet of 1779 as it was almost on the same parallel as the star Epsilon Virginis. Messier described M58 as a very faint nebula in Virgo which would disappear in the slightest amount of light he used to illuminate the micrometer wires. This description was later contradicted by John Herschel's observations in 1833 where he described it as a very bright galaxy, especially towards the middle. Herschel's observations were also similar to the descriptions of both John Dreyer and William Henry Smyth who said that M58 was a bright galaxy, mottled, irregularly round and very much brighter toward the middle.

== Characteristics ==
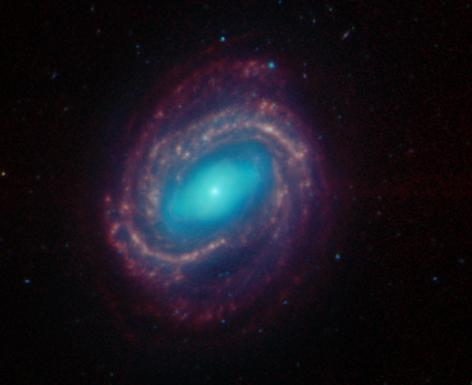
An infrared image of M58 taken by the Spitzer Space Telescope (SST)

Like many other spiral galaxies of the Virgo Cluster (e.g. Messier 90), Messier 58 is an anemic galaxy with low star formation activity concentrated within the galaxy's optical disk, and relatively little neutral hydrogen, also located inside its disk, concentrated in clumps, compared with other galaxies of similar morphological type. This deficiency of gas is believed to be caused by interactions with Virgo's intracluster medium.

Messier 58 has a low-luminosity active galactic nucleus, where a starburst may be present as well as a supermassive black hole with a mass of around 70 million solar masses. It is also one of the very few galaxies known to possess a UCNR (ultra-compact nuclear ring), a series of star-forming regions located in a very small ring around the center of the galaxy. This led to its being dubbed the "ring bearer galaxy" by the popular astronomy YouTube program "Deep Sky videos".

== Supernovae ==
Two supernovae have been observed in the M58 galaxy:

- SN 1988A (Type II, mag. 13.5) was discovered by Kaoru Ikeya, Robert Evans, Christian Pollas and Shingo Horiguchi on January 18, 1988. It was found 40 arcseconds south of the galaxy center.
- SN 1989M (Type Ia, mag. 12.2) was discovered by Givi N. Kimeridze on 28 June 1989. It was found 33 arcseconds north and 44 arcseconds west of M58's nucleus.

== See also ==
- List of Messier objects
- Messier 91
- Messier 88
- Messier 109
- Messier 100
- NGC 4536
