= Messier 89 =

Elliptical galaxy in the constellation Virgo

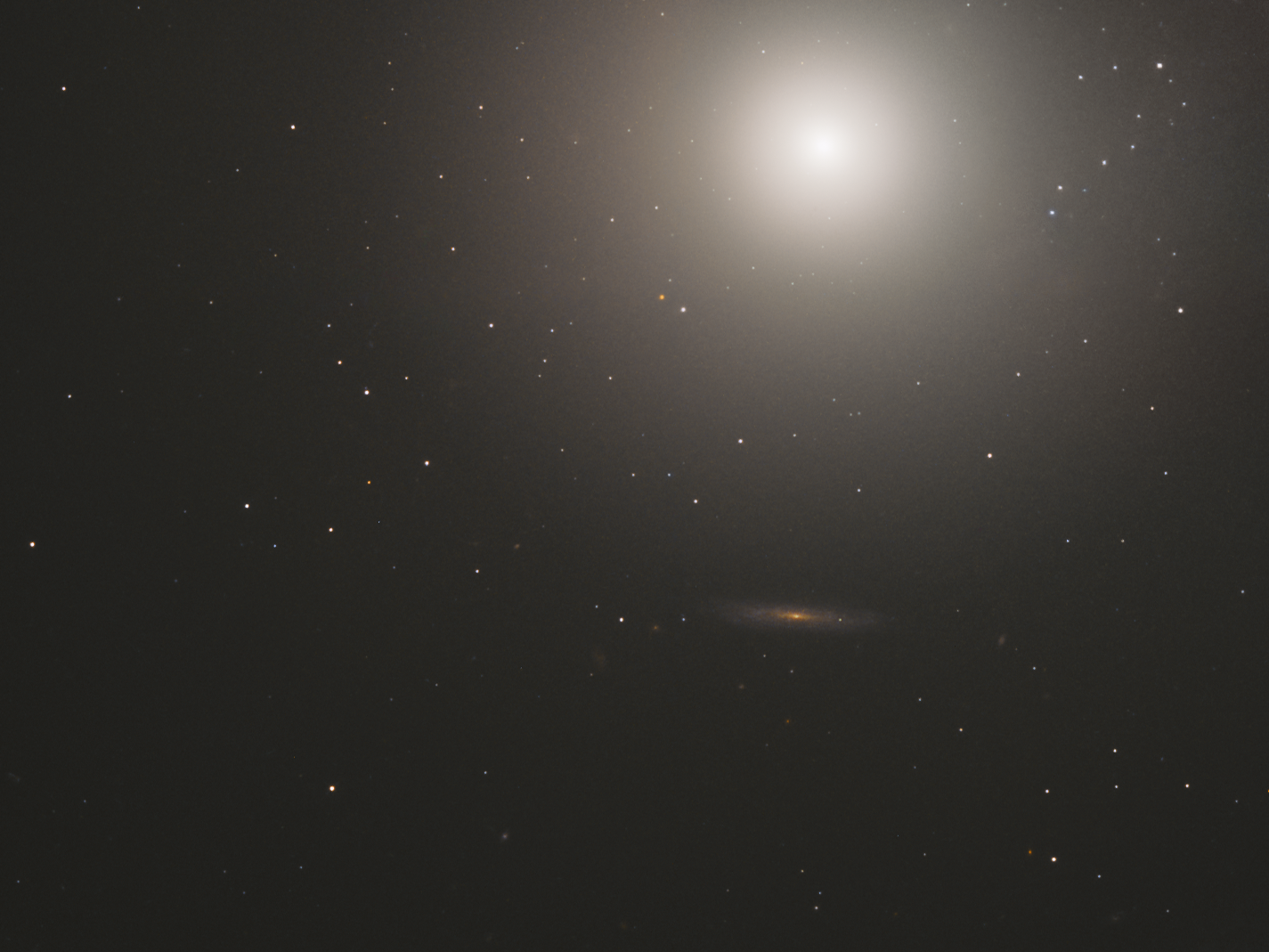
- M89 by Hubble Space Telescope.

Observation data (J2000 epoch)
- Constellation: Virgo
- Right ascension: 12^{h} 35^{m} 39.8^{s}
- Declination: +12° 33′ 23″
- Redshift: 0.001134±0.000014
- Heliocentric radial velocity: 340±4 km/s
- Galactocentric velocity: 290±5 km/s
- Distance: 50 ± 3 Mly (15.33 ± 0.92 Mpc)
- Apparent magnitude (V): 9.8

Characteristics
- Type: E, LINER, H_{II}Sy2
- Apparent size (V): 5.1 × 4.7 moa

Other designations
- NGC 4552, UGC 7760, PGC 41968
- References: SIMBAD: Search M89

Messier 89 (M89 for short, also known as NGC 4552) is an elliptical galaxy in the constellation Virgo. It was discovered by Charles Messier on March 18, 1781. M89 is a member of the Virgo Cluster of galaxies.

== Features ==
Current observations allow the possibility that M89 may be nearly perfectly spherical. Distinct flattening as ellipsoids is found in all easily measurable comparators up to a few times of its distance. The alternative explanation is that it is an ellipsoid oriented so that it appears spherical to an observer on Earth.

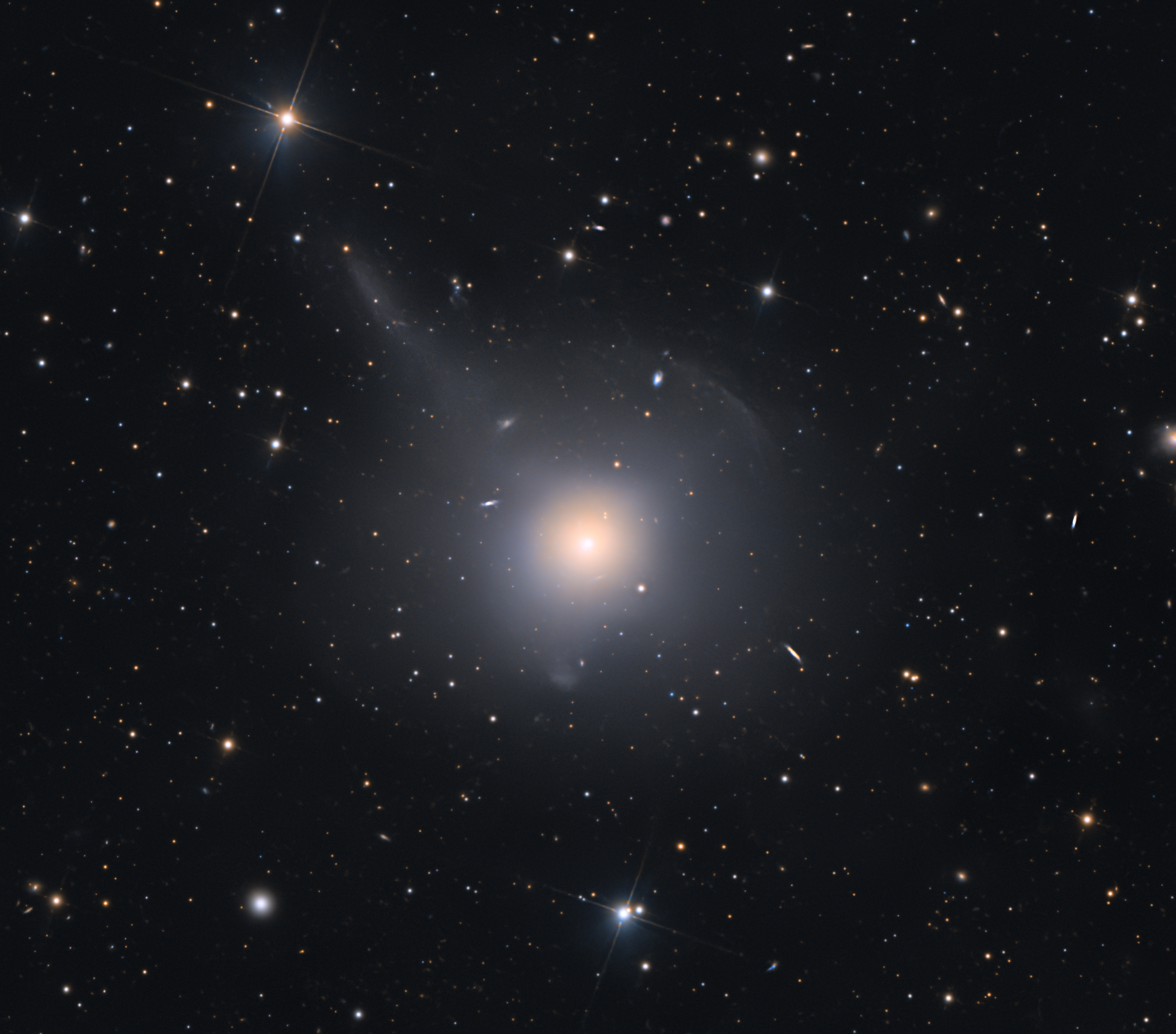
Long exposures of M89 reveal a distinct tidal stream extending roughly 100,000 light-years outward from the galaxy.

The galaxy features a surrounding structure of gas and dust, extending up to 150,000 light-years and jets of heated particles up to two-thirds of that. This indicates that it may have once been an active quasar or radio galaxy. M89 has an extensive and complex system of surrounding shells and plumes, indicating that it has seen one or several notable mergers.

Chandra studies in the wavelength of the X-Rays show two ring-like structures of hot gas in M89's nucleus, suggesting an outburst there 1 to 2 million years ago as well as ram-pressure stripping acting on the galaxy as it moves through Virgo's intracluster medium. The supermassive black hole at the core has a mass of (4.8±0.8)×10^{8} M_{☉}.

M89 also has a large array of globular clusters. A 2006 survey estimates that there are 2,000 ± 700 of these within 25′. This compares to 150 to 200 of these thought (among which many proven) to surround the Milky Way.

== Gallery ==
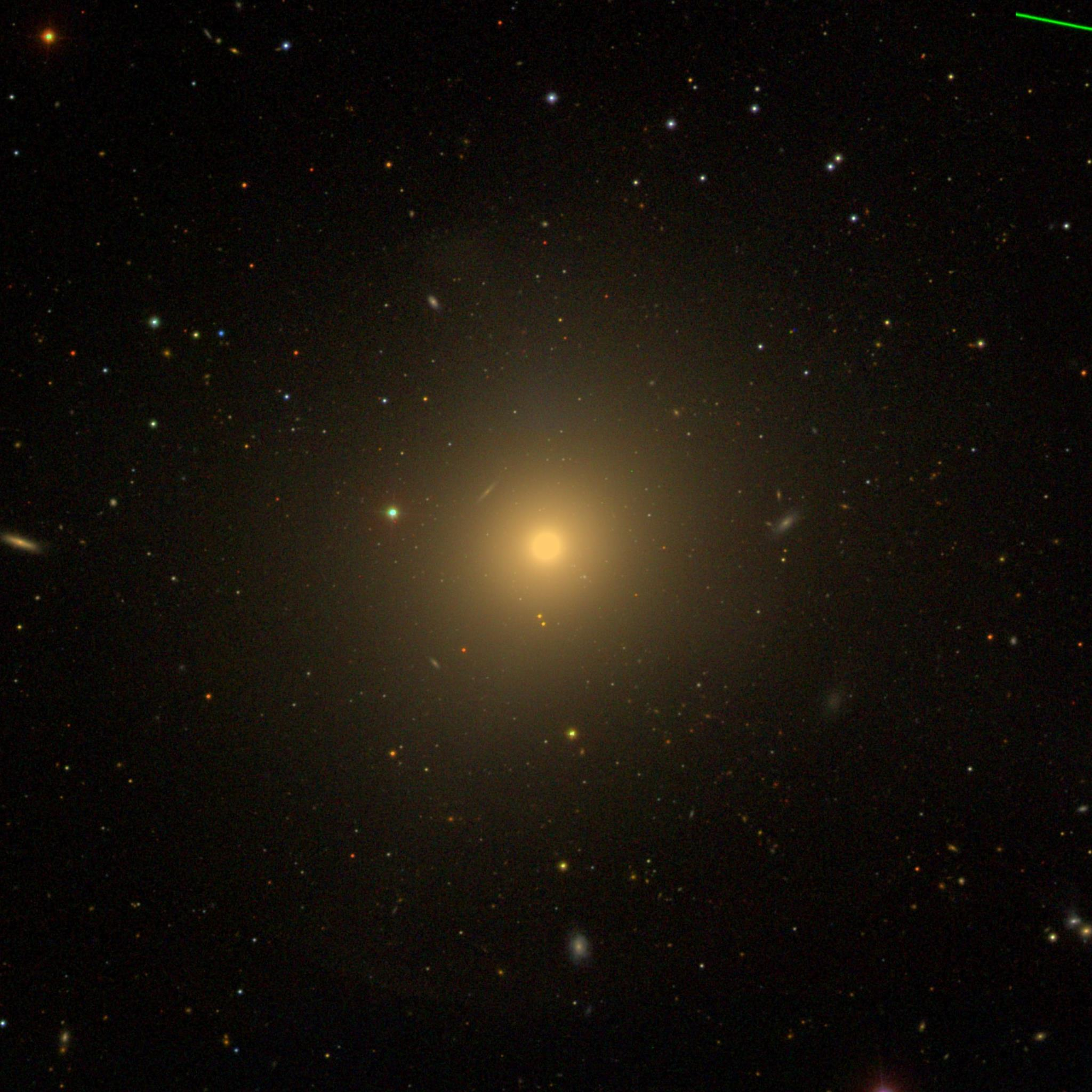
Messier 89 by the Sloan Digital Sky Survey

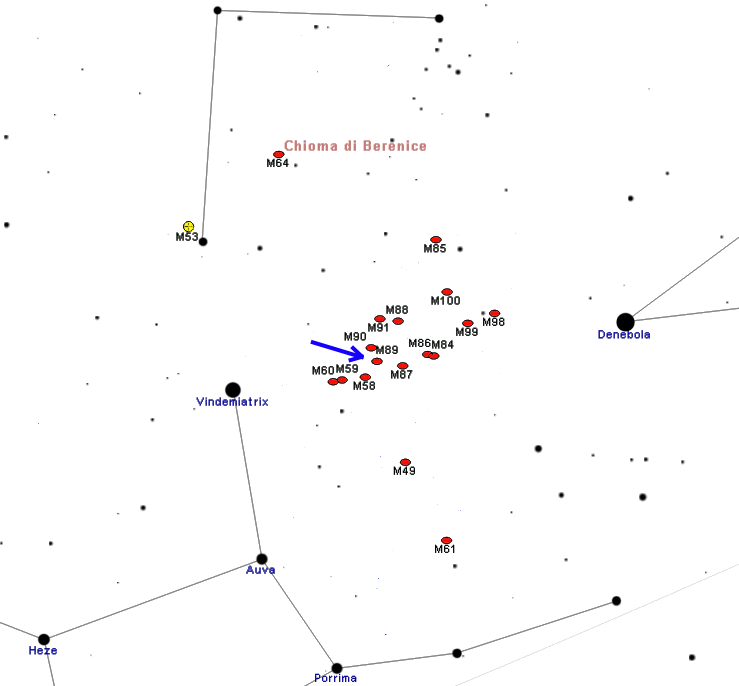
Map of M89

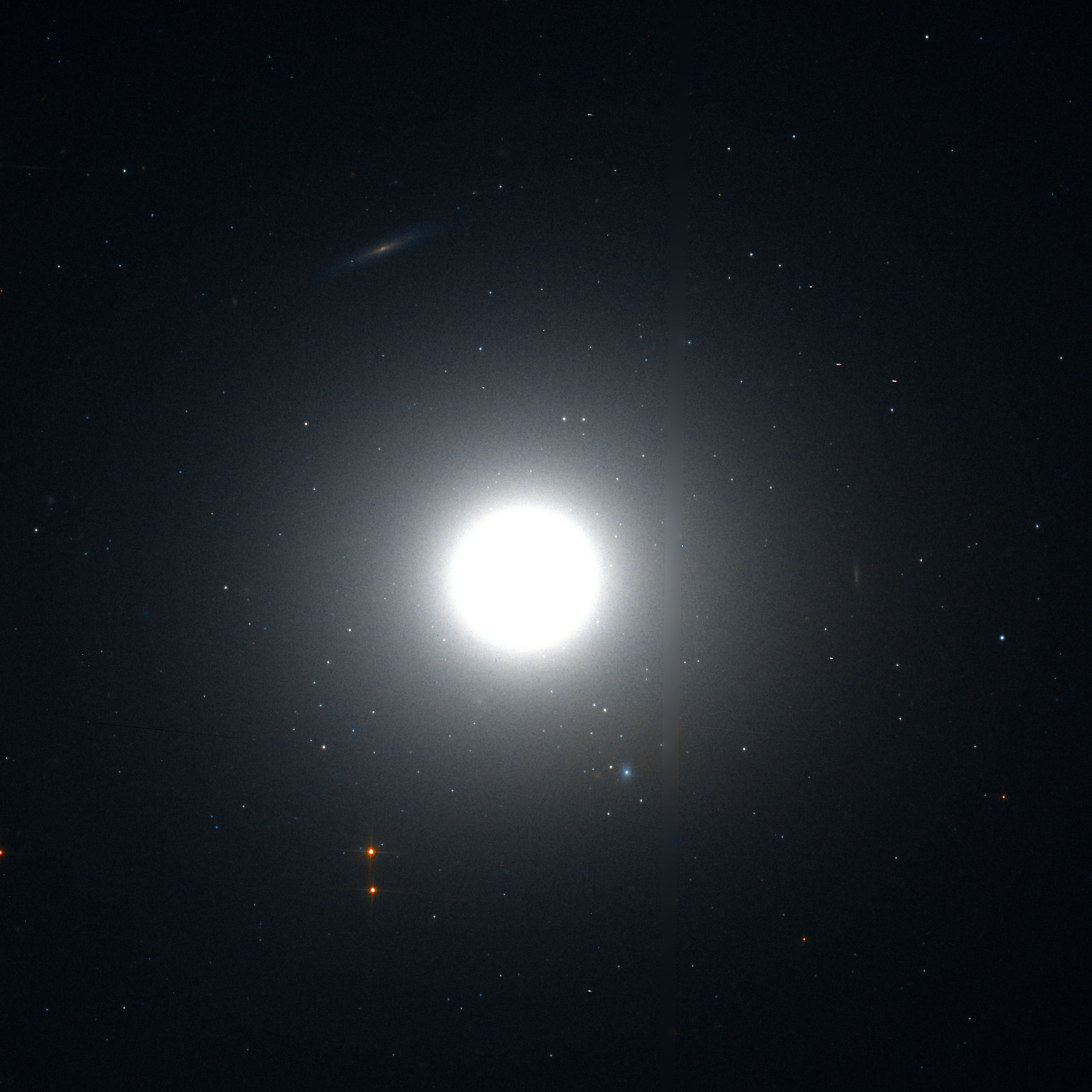
HST image of M89

== See also ==
- List of Messier objects
