= Messier 23 =

Open cluster in Sagittarius

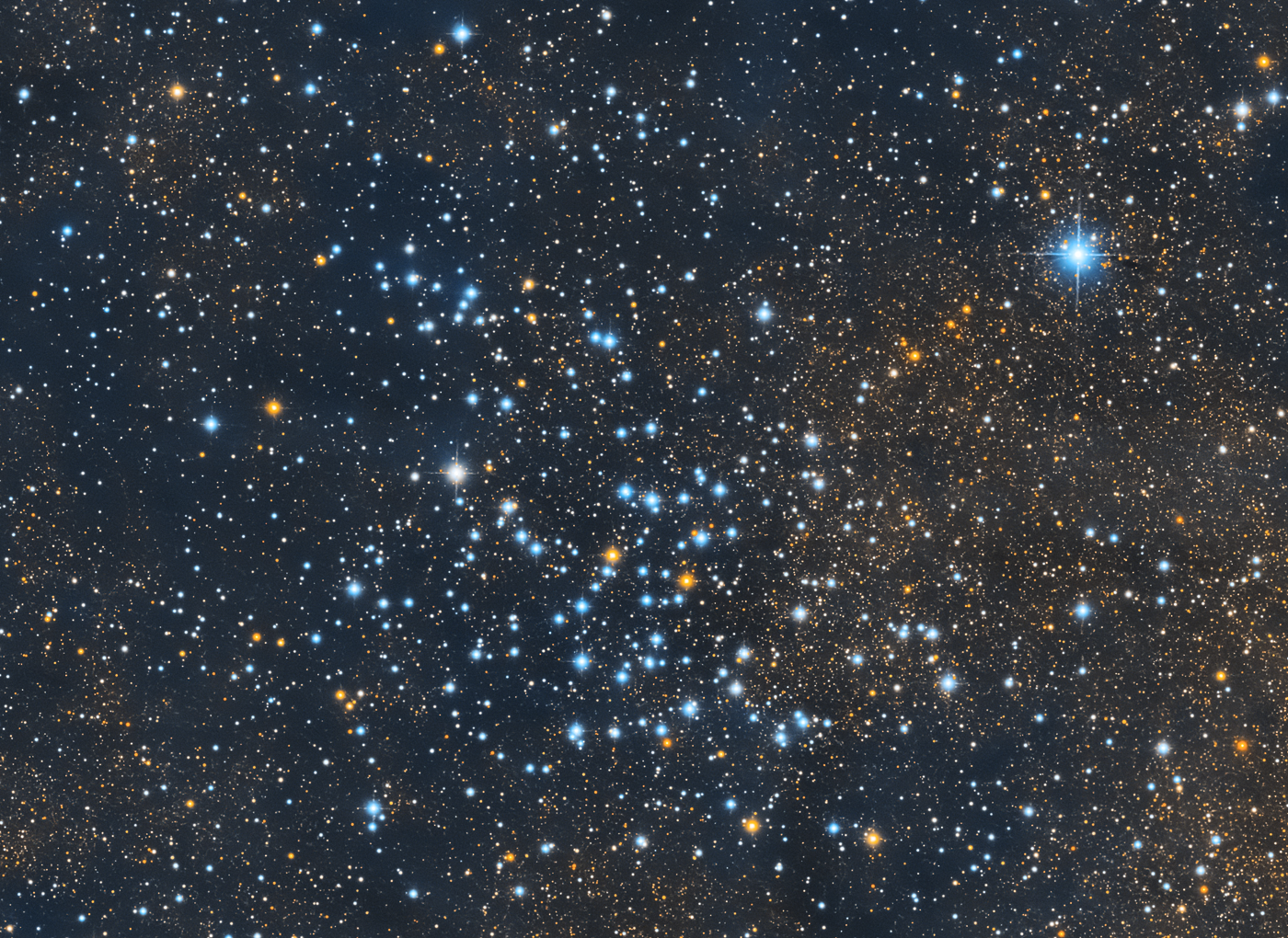
- Open cluster Messier 23 in Sagittarius

Observation data (J2000 epoch)
- Right ascension: 17^{h} 57^{m} 04^{s}
- Declination: −18° 59′ 06″
- Distance: 2,050 ly (628 pc)
- Apparent magnitude (V): 5.5
- Apparent dimensions (V): 35′

Physical characteristics
- Mass: 1,206 M_{☉}
- Radius: 8 ly
- Estimated age: 330±100 myr
- Other designations: M23, NGC 6494, Cr 356, C 1753-190

Associations
- Constellation: Sagittarius

Messier 23, also known as NGC 6494, is an open cluster of stars in the northwest of the southern constellation of Sagittarius. It was discovered by Charles Messier in 1764. (Note: On June 20) It can be found in good conditions with binoculars or a modestly sized telescope. It is in front of "an extensive gas and dust network", which there may be no inter-association. It is within 5° the sun's position (namely in mid-December) so can be occulted by the moon.

The cluster is centered about 2,050 light years away. Estimates for the number of its members range from 169 up to 414, with a directly-counted mass of 1,206 M_{☉}; 1,332 M_{☉} by application of the virial theorem. The cluster is around 330 million years old with a near-solar metallicity of [Fe/H] = −0.04. The brightest component (lucida) is of magnitude 9.3. Five of the cluster members are candidate red giants, while orange variable VV Sgr in the far south, (Note: east of blue-white 7th magnitude fellow member HD 163427) is a candidate asymptotic giant branch star.

A 6th-magnitude star, shown in the top-right corner, figures in the far north-west as a foreground star – HD 163245 (HR 6679). Its parallax shift is 9.8912±0.0518 mas, having taken into account proper motion, which means it is about 101 parsecs (330 ly) away.

== Gallery ==
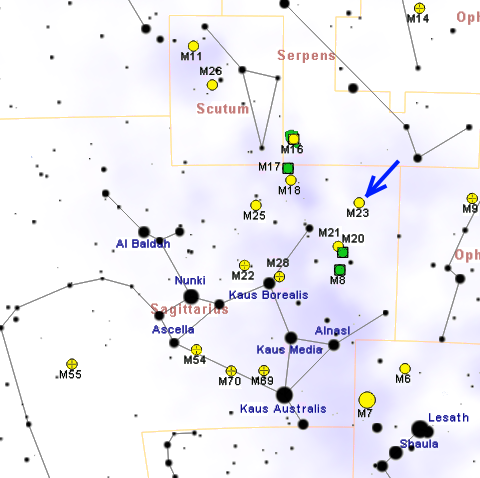
Map showing the location of M23

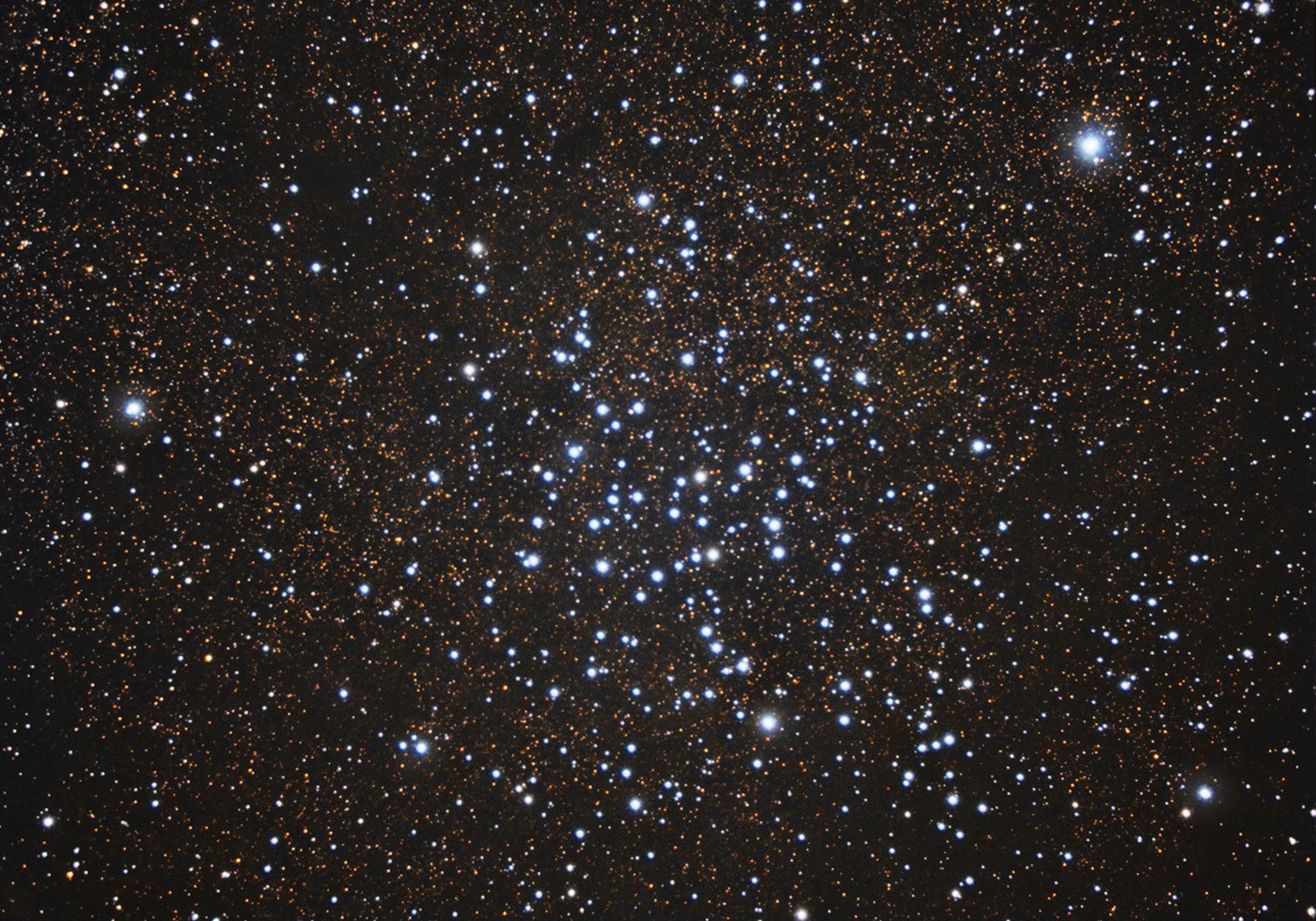
Open cluster Messier 23 in Sagittarius

== See also ==
- List of Messier objects
