= Little Dumbbell Nebula =

Planetary nebula in the constellation Perseus

Emission nebula
- Planetary nebula
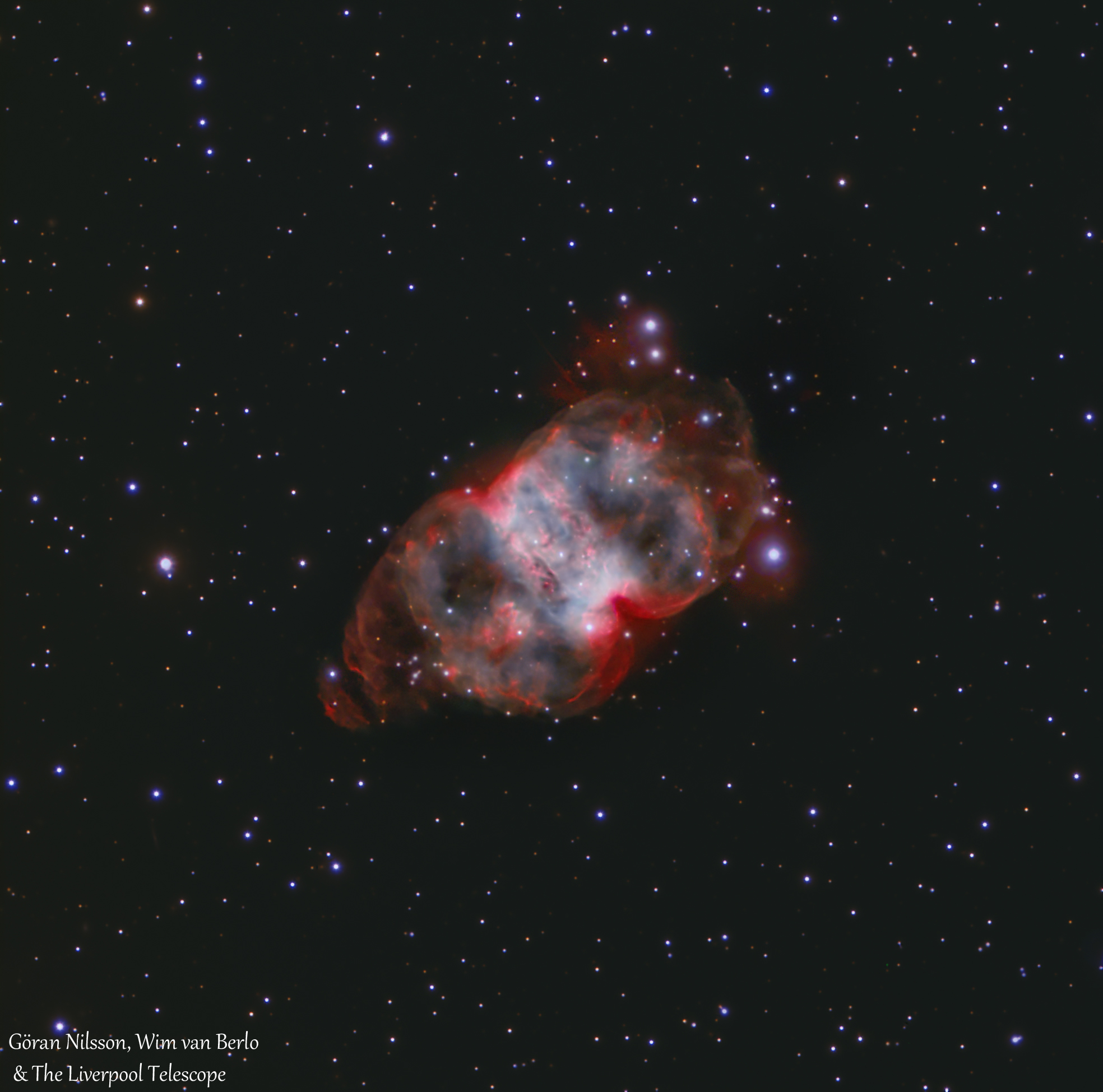
- Color composite image of the Little Dumbbell Nebula taken by the Liverpool Telescope

Observation data: J2000.0 epoch
- Right ascension: 01^{h} 42.4^{m}
- Declination: +51° 34′ 31″
- Distance: 2 500 ly (780 pc)
- Apparent magnitude (V): +10.1
- Apparent dimensions (V): 2.7 × 1.8 arcmin (′)
- Constellation: Perseus

Physical characteristics
- Radius: 0.617 ly
- Designations: M76, NGC 650/651

The Little Dumbbell Nebula, also known as Messier 76, NGC 650/651, the Barbell Nebula, or the Cork Nebula, is a planetary nebula in the northern constellation of Perseus. It was discovered by Pierre Méchain in 1780 and included in Charles Messier's catalog of comet-like objects as number 76. It was first classified as a planetary nebula in 1918 by the astronomer Heber Doust Curtis. However, others might have previously recognized it as a planetary nebula; for example, William Huggins found its spectrum indicated it was a nebula (instead of a galaxy or a star cluster); and Isaac Roberts in 1891 suggested that M76 might be similar to the Ring Nebula (M57), as seen instead from the side view.

M76 is currently classed as a type of bipolar planetary nebula (BPN), composed of a ring which we see edge-on as the central bar structure, and two lobes on either opening of the ring. The progenitor star ejected the ring when it was in the asymptotic giant branch, before it had become a planetary nebula. Soon afterward the star expelled the rest of its outer layers, creating the two lobes, and leaving a white dwarf as the remnant of the star's core. Distance to M76 is currently estimated to be 780 parsecs or 2,500 light years, making the average dimensions about 0.378 pc. (1.23 ly.) across.

The total nebula shines at the apparent magnitude of +10.1 with its central white dwarf or planetary nebula nucleus (PNN) at +15.9v (16.1B) magnitude. The nucleus has a surface temperature of about 88,400 K. It has a radial velocity of −19.1km/s.

The Little Dumbbell Nebula derives its common name from its resemblance to the Dumbbell Nebula (M27) in the constellation of Vulpecula. It was originally thought to consist of two separate emission nebulae so it bears the New General Catalogue numbers NGC 650 and 651.

== See also ==
- The Dumbbell (M27), Ring (M57), and Helix (NGC 7293) Nebulae (three other nebulae of the same type as M76)
- List of Messier objects
- List of planetary nebulae
