= Messier 21 =

Open cluster in the constellation Sagittarius

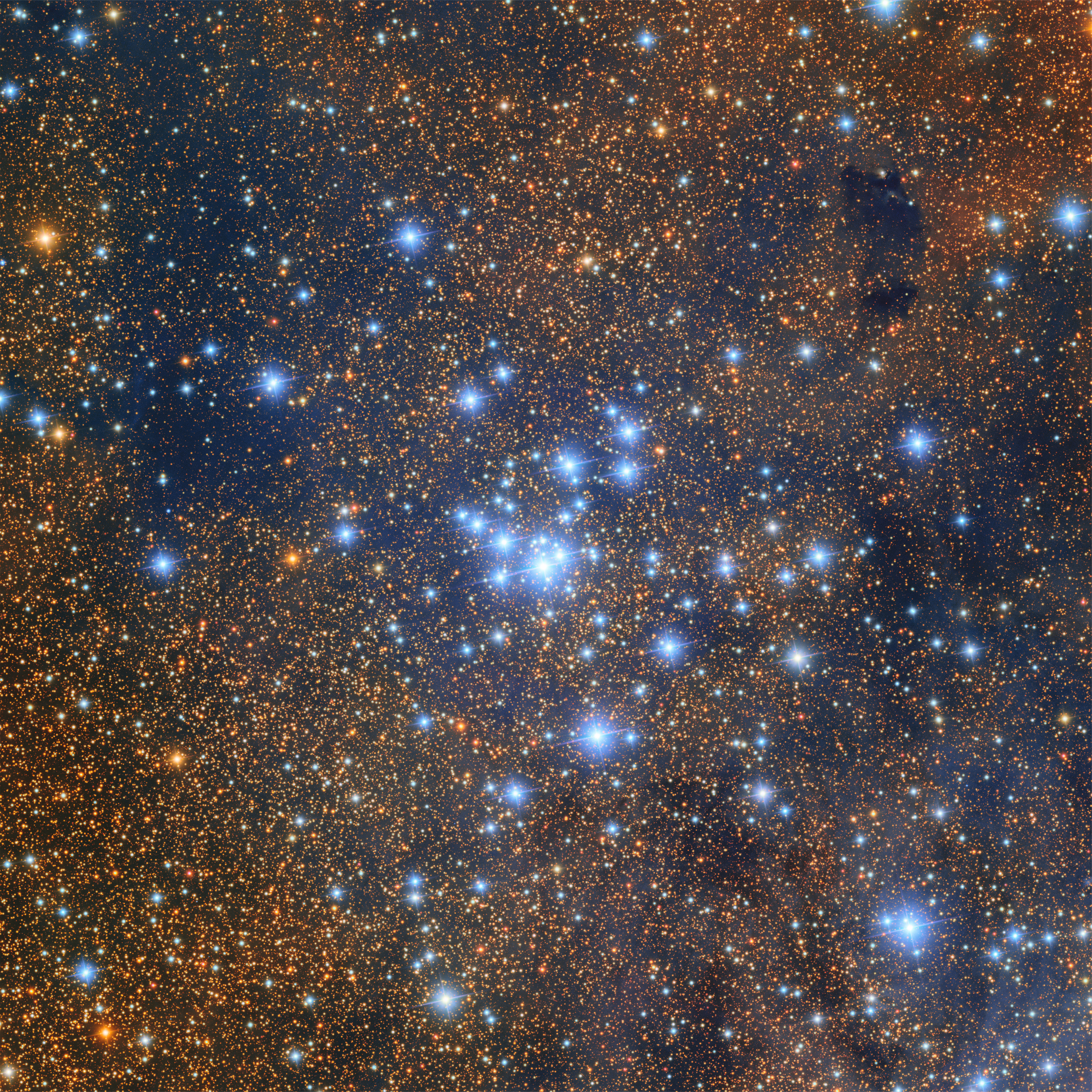
- Messier 21 imaged by the Vera C. Rubin Observatory

Observation data (J2000.0 epoch)
- Right ascension: 18^{h} 04^{m} 13.0^{s}
- Declination: −22° 29′ 24″
- Distance: 3,930 ly (1,205 pc)
- Apparent magnitude (V): 6.5
- Apparent dimensions (V): 14.0′

Physical characteristics
- Mass: 783.4 M_{☉}
- Radius: 12 ly (3.6 pc)
- Estimated age: 6.6×10^{6} years
- Other designations: M21, NGC 6531, Cr 363, OCl 26.0

Associations

Messier 21 or M21, also designated NGC 6531 or Webb's Cross, is an open cluster of stars located to the north-east of Sagittarius in the night sky, close to the Messier objects M20 to M25 (except M24). It was discovered and catalogued by Charles Messier on June 5, 1764. This cluster is relatively young and tightly packed. A few blue giant stars have been identified in the cluster, but Messier 21 is composed mainly of small dim stars. With a magnitude of 6.5, M21 is not visible to the naked eye; however, with the smallest binoculars it can be easily spotted on a dark night. The cluster is positioned near the Trifid Nebula (NGC 6514), but is not associated with that nebulosity. It forms part of the Sagittarius OB1 association.

This cluster is located 1,205 pc away from Earth with an extinction of 0.87. Messier 21 is around 6.6 million years old with a mass of 783.4 M_{☉}. It has a tidal radius of 11.7 pc, with a nucleus radius of 1.6±0.1 pc and a coronal radius of 3.6±0.2 pc. There are at least 105±11 members within the coronal radius down to visual magnitude 15.5, including many early B-type stars. An estimated 40–60 of the observed low-mass members are expected to be pre-main-sequence stars, with 26 candidates identified based upon hydrogen alpha emission and the presence of lithium in the spectrum. The stars in the cluster do not show a significant spread in ages, suggesting that the star formation was triggered all at once.

As of January 2022, Messier 21 is one of the few remaining objects within the Messier Catalog to not have been photographed by the Hubble Space Telescope.

== Gallery ==
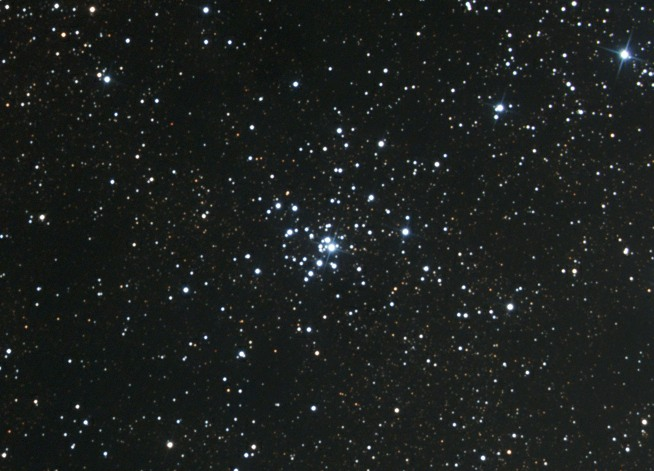
Open cluster Messier 21 in Sagittarius imaged by John Saunders

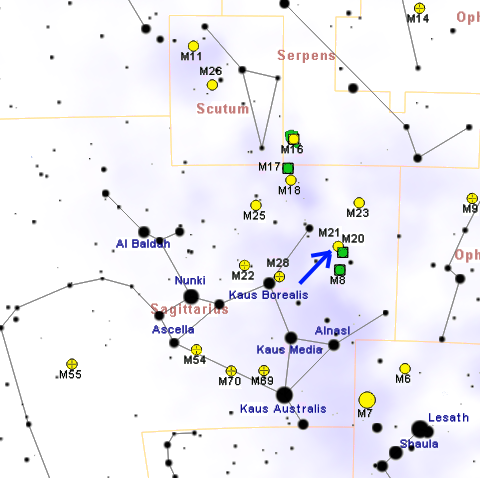
Map showing the location of M21

== See also ==
- List of Messier objects
