= Messier 55 =

Globular cluster in the constellation Sagittarius

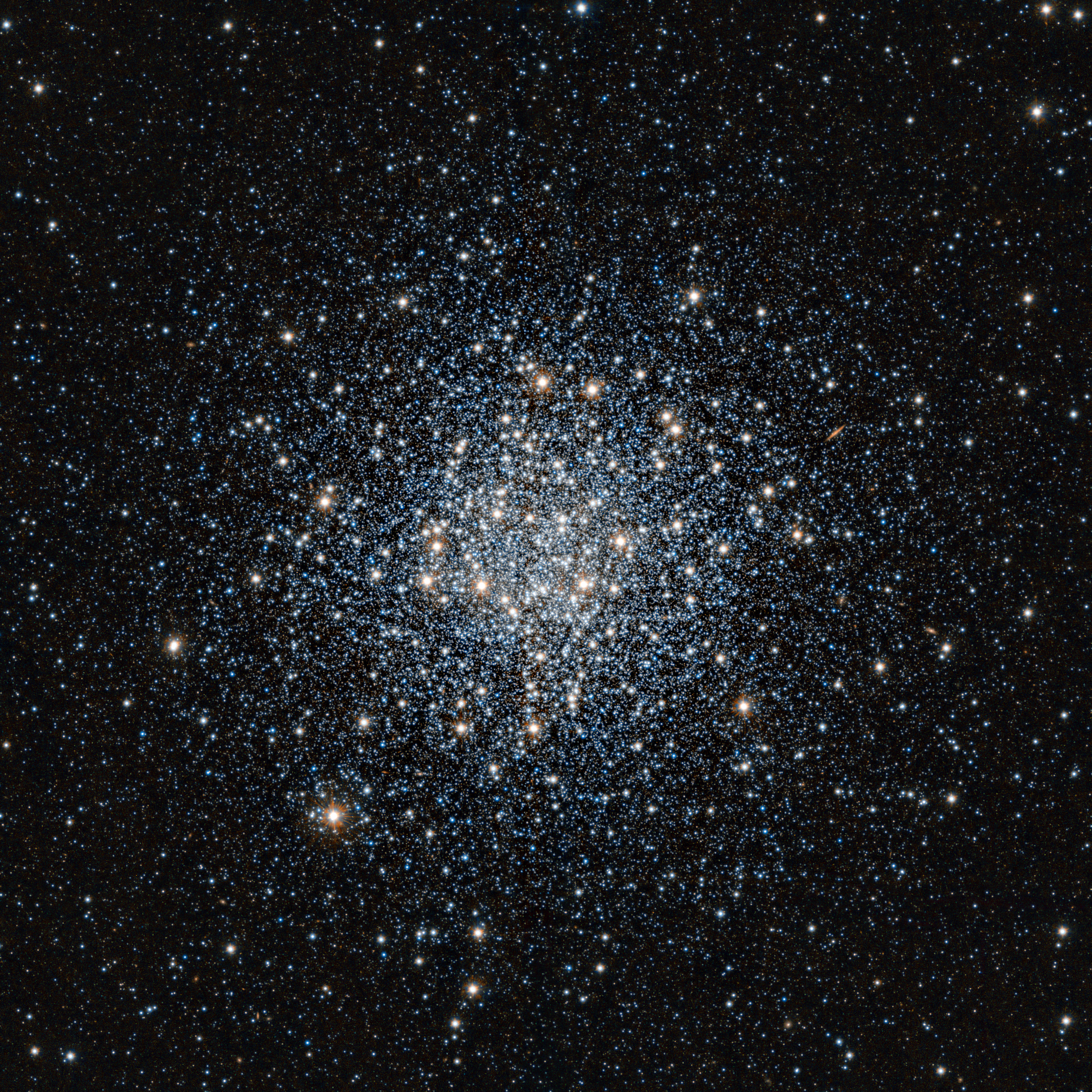
- Globular cluster Messier 55 in Sagittarius

Observation data (J2000 epoch)
- Class: XI
- Constellation: Sagittarius
- Right ascension: 19^{h} 39^{m} 59.71^{s}
- Declination: −30° 57′ 53.1″
- Distance: 17.6 kly (5.4 kpc)
- Apparent magnitude (V): 6.3
- Apparent dimensions (V): 19.0′

Physical characteristics
- Mass: 2.69×10^{5} M_{☉}
- Radius: 48 ly
- Metallicity: [Fe/H] = –1.94 dex
- Estimated age: 12.3 Gyr
- Other designations: M55, NGC 6809, GCl 113, C 1936-310

Messier 55 (also known as M55, NGC 6809, or Specter Cluster) is a globular cluster in the south of the constellation Sagittarius. It was discovered by Nicolas Louis de Lacaille in 1752 (Note: On June 16th) while observing from what today is South Africa. Starting in 1754, Charles Messier made several attempts to find this object from Paris but its low declination meant from there it rises daily very little above the horizon, hampering observation. (Note: Specifically in the south of this constellation which makes it visible from everywhere below about the 50th parallel north. However the Sun passes through Sagittarius (or technically the Earth orbits so as to make the Sun seem to do so) throughout December. This also makes the cluster mostly risen during day, not night, in the nearest months.) He observed and catalogued it in 1778. The cluster can be seen with 50 mm binoculars; resolving individual stars needs a medium-sized telescope.

It is about 17,600 light-years away from Earth. It contains about 269,000 solar masses (M_{☉}). As with other Milky Way globular clusters, it has few elements other than hydrogen and helium compared to the Sun. Messier 55 therefore has "low metallicity". This quantity is normally listed as the base 10 logarithm of the proportion of the Sun; for NGC 6809 the metallicity is given by: [Fe/H] = −1.94 dex, whereby −2 would be 100 times less iron than the Sun. This means the cluster has 1.1% of the proportion of the Sun's iron compared to hydrogen and helium.

Only about 55 variable stars have been found in the central part of M55.

== Gallery ==
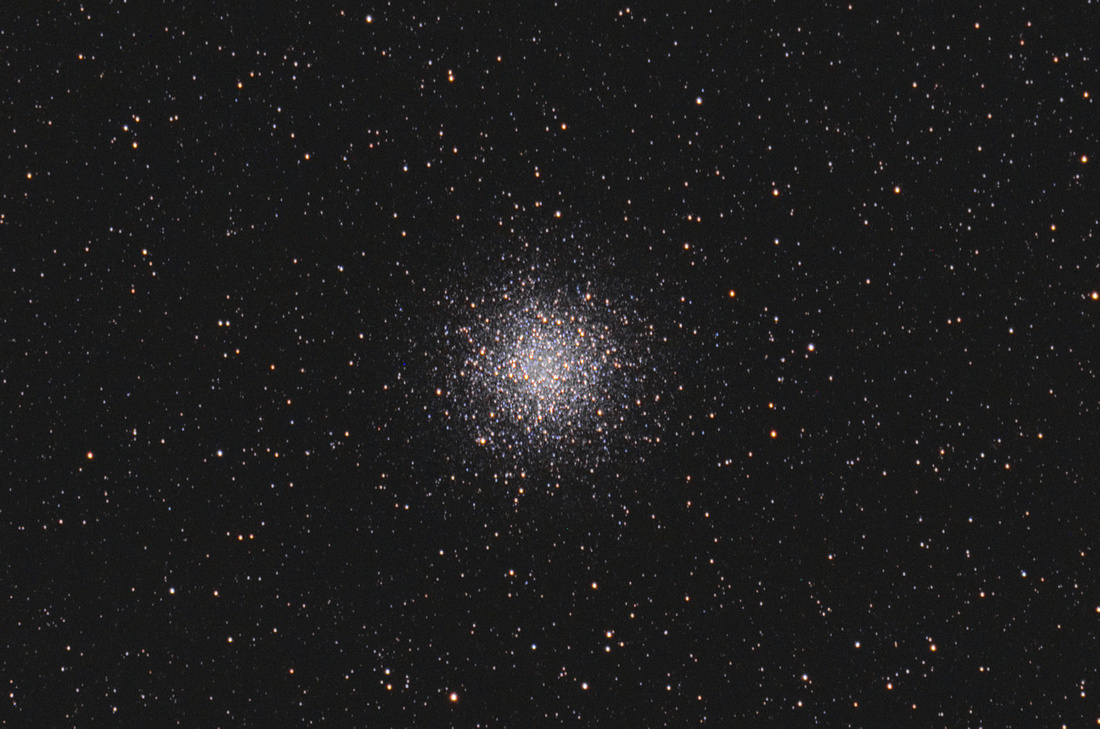
Messier 55, wide field view

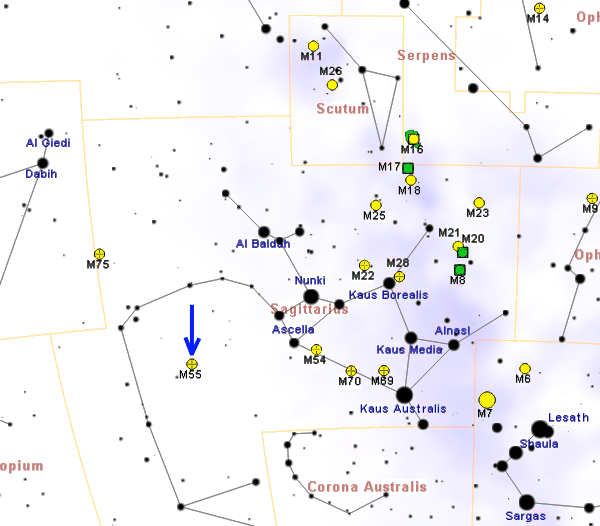
Map showing the location of M55

== See also ==
- List of Messier objects
