= Messier object =

Astronomical objects catalogued by Charles Messier

Messier Catalog
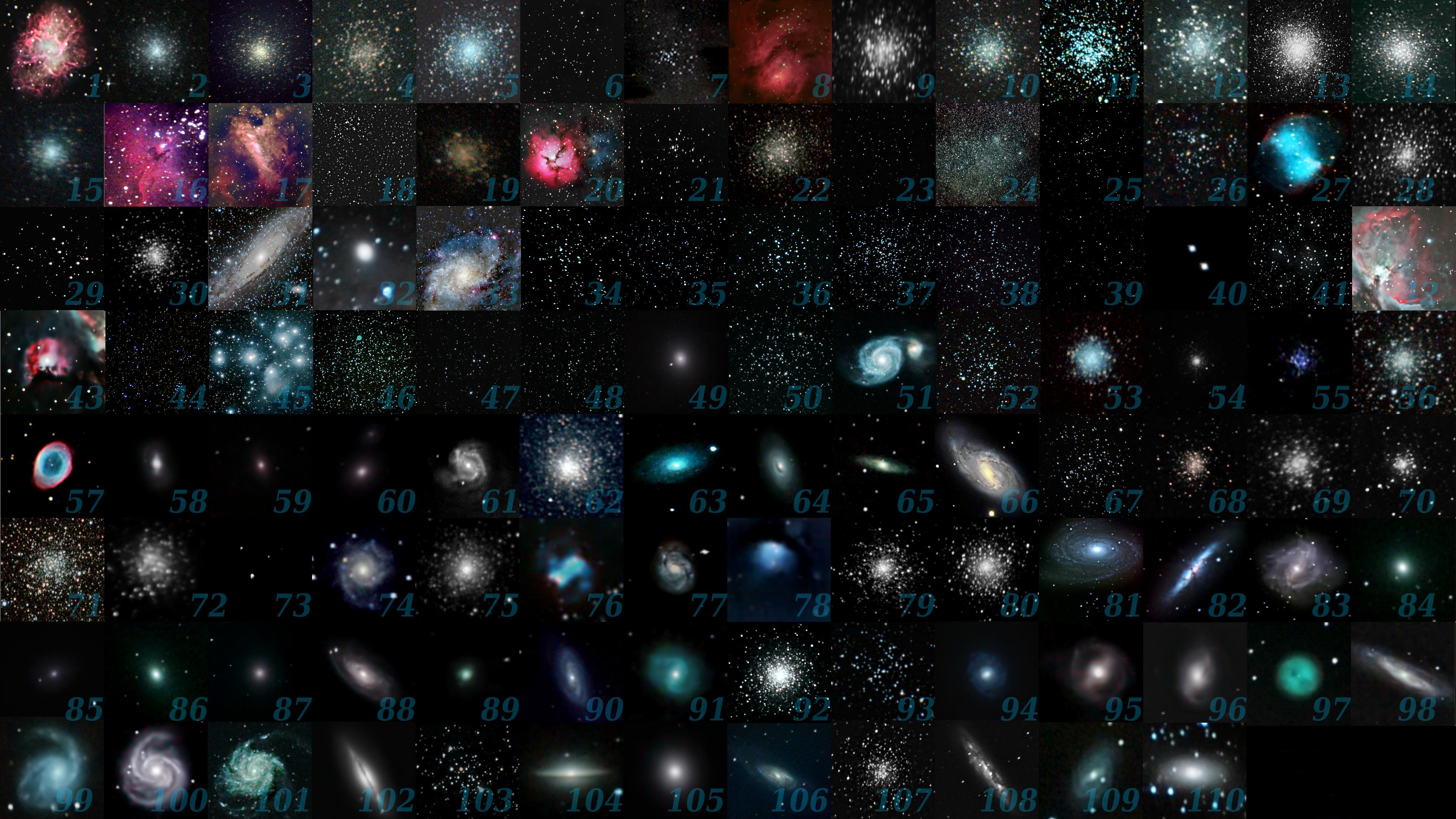
- All Messier objects
- Alternative names: Messier Catalogue
- Survey type: Astronomical catalogue
- Named after: Charles Messier
- Published: 1774 (preliminary version)
- Related media on Commons

The Messier objects are a set of 110 astronomical objects catalogued by the French astronomer Charles Messier in his Catalogue des Nébuleuses et des Amas d'Étoiles (Catalogue of Nebulae and Star Clusters). Because Messier was interested only in finding comets, he created a list of those non-comet objects that frustrated his hunt for them. This list, which Messier created in collaboration with his assistant Pierre Méchain, is now known as the Messier catalogue. The Messier catalogue is one of the most famous lists of astronomical objects, and many objects on the list are still referenced by their Messier numbers. The catalogue includes most of the astronomical deep-sky objects that can be easily observed from Earth's Northern Hemisphere; many Messier objects are popular targets for amateur astronomers.

A preliminary version of the catalogue first appeared in 1774 in the Memoirs of the French Academy of Sciences for the year 1771. The first version of Messier's catalogue contained 45 objects, which were not numbered. Eighteen of the objects were discovered by Messier; the rest had been previously observed by other astronomers. By 1780 the catalogue had increased to 70 objects. The final version of the catalogue containing 103 objects was published in 1781 in the Connaissance des Temps for the year 1784. However, due to what was thought for a long time to be the incorrect addition of Messier 102, the total number remained 102. Other astronomers, using side notes in Messier's texts, eventually expanded the list to 110 objects.

The catalogue consists of a diverse range of astronomical objects, from star clusters and nebulae to galaxies. For example, Messier 1 is a supernova remnant, known as the Crab Nebula, and the great spiral Andromeda Galaxy is M31. Further inclusions followed.

== Lists and editions ==
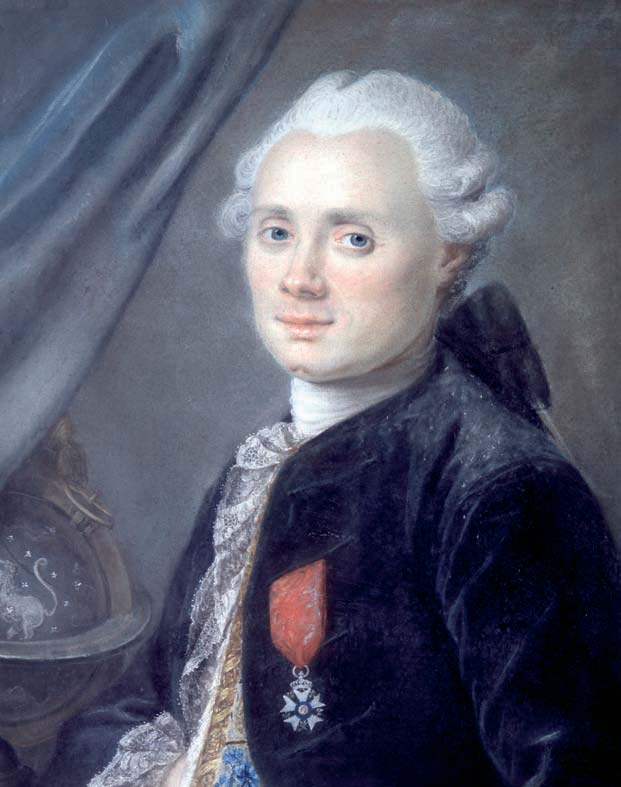
Charles Messier

The first edition of 1774 covered 45 objects (M1 to M45). The total list published by Messier in 1781 contained 103 objects, but the list was expanded through successive additions by other astronomers, motivated by notes in Messier's and Méchain's texts indicating that at least one of them knew of the additional objects. The first such addition came from Nicolas Camille Flammarion in 1921, who added Messier 104 after finding a note Messier made in a copy of the 1781 edition of the catalogue. M105 to M107 were added by Helen Sawyer Hogg in 1947, M108 and M109 by Owen Gingerich in 1960, and M110 by Kenneth Glyn Jones in 1967. M102 was observed by Méchain, who communicated his notes to Messier. Méchain later concluded that this object was simply a re-observation of M101, though some sources suggest that the object Méchain observed was the galaxy NGC 5866 and identify that as M102.

Messier's final catalogue was included in the Connaissance des Temps pour l'Année 1784 [Knowledge of the Times for the Year 1784], the French official yearly publication of astronomical ephemerides.

Messier lived and conducted his astronomical work at the Hôtel de Cluny (now the Musée national du Moyen Âge), in Paris, France. The list he compiled contains only objects found in the sky area he could observe from the north celestial pole to a celestial latitude of about −35.7°. He did not observe or list objects visible only from farther south, such as the Large and Small Magellanic Clouds.

== Observations ==
The Messier catalogue comprises nearly all of the most spectacular examples of the five types of deep-sky object – diffuse nebulae, planetary nebulae, open clusters, globular clusters, and galaxies – visible from European latitudes. Furthermore, almost all of the Messier objects are among the closest to Earth in their respective classes, which makes them heavily studied with professional class instruments that today can resolve small and visually significant details in them. A summary of the astrophysics of each Messier object can be found in the Concise Catalog of Deep-sky Objects.

Since these objects could be observed visually with the relatively small-aperture refracting telescope (approximately 100 mm ≈ 4 inches) used by Messier to study the sky from downtown Paris, they are among the brightest and thus most attractive astronomical objects (of the class popularly called deep-sky objects) observable from Earth, and are popular targets for visual study and astrophotography available to modern amateur astronomers using larger aperture equipment. In early spring, astronomers sometimes gather for "Messier marathons", when all of the objects can be viewed over a single night.

== Messier objects ==
Open cluster
Globular cluster
Diffuse nebula
Planetary nebula
Supernova remnant
Galaxy
Other

Messier no.	NGC/IC no.	Common name	Image	Object type	Distance (kly)	Constellation	Apparent magnitude	Apparent dimensions	Right ascension	Declination
M1	NGC 1952	Crab Nebula		Supernova remnant	4.9–8.1	Taurus	8.4	420″ × 290″	05^{h} 34^{m} 31.9^{s}	+22° 00′ 52.2″
M2	NGC 7089	—		Globular cluster	33	Aquarius	6.5	16′	21^{h} 33^{m} 27.0^{s}	−00° 49′ 23.7″
M3	NGC 5272	—		Globular cluster	33.9	Canes Venatici	6.2	18′	13^{h} 42^{m} 11.6^{s}	+28° 22′ 38.2″
M4	NGC 6121	Spider Globular Cluster		Globular cluster	7.2	Scorpius	5.6	26′	16^{h} 23^{m} 35.2^{s}	−26° 31′ 32.7″
M5	NGC 5904	Rose Cluster		Globular cluster	24.5	Serpens	5.6	23′	15^{h} 18^{m} 33.2^{s}	+02° 04′ 51.7″
M6	NGC 6405	Butterfly Cluster		Open cluster	1.6	Scorpius	4.2	25′	17^{h} 40.1^{m}	−32° 13′
M7	NGC 6475	Ptolemy's Cluster		Open cluster	0.65–1.31	Scorpius	3.3	80′	17^{h} 53^{m} 51.2^{s}	−34° 47′ 34″
M8	NGC 6523	Lagoon Nebula		Nebula with cluster	4.1	Sagittarius	4.6	90′ × 40′	18^{h} 03^{m} 37^{s}	−24° 23′ 12″
M9	NGC 6333	—		Globular cluster	25.8	Ophiuchus	7.7	9.3′	17^{h} 19^{m} 11.8^{s}	−18° 30′ 58.5″
M10	NGC 6254	—		Globular cluster	14.3	Ophiuchus	6.6	20′	16^{h} 57^{m} 8.9^{s}	−04° 05′ 58.1″
M11	NGC 6705	Wild Duck Cluster		Open cluster	6.2	Scutum	5.8	22.8′	18^{h} 51.1^{m}	−06° 16′
M12	NGC 6218	—		Globular cluster	15.7	Ophiuchus	6.7	16′	16^{h} 47^{m} 14.2^{s}	−01° 56′ 54.7″
M13	NGC 6205	Great Hercules Cluster		Globular cluster	22.2	Hercules	5.8	20′	16^{h} 41^{m} 41.2^{s}	+36° 27′ 35.5″
M14	NGC 6402	—		Globular cluster	30.3	Ophiuchus	7.6	11′	17^{h} 37^{m} 36.2^{s}	−03° 14′ 45.3″
M15	NGC 7078	Great Pegasus Cluster		Globular cluster	33	Pegasus	6.2	18′	21^{h} 29^{m} 58.3^{s}	+12° 10′ 01.2″
M16	NGC 6611	Eagle Nebula		H II region nebula with cluster	7	Serpens	6.4	70′ × 50′	18^{h} 18^{m} 48^{s}	−13° 49′
M17	NGC 6618	Omega, Swan, Horseshoe, Lobster, or Checkmark Nebula		H II region nebula with cluster	5–6	Sagittarius	6.0	11′	18^{h} 20^{m} 26^{s}	−16° 10′ 36″
M18	NGC 6613	Black Swan Cluster		Open cluster	4.9	Sagittarius	7.5	9.8′	18^{h} 19.9^{m}	−17° 08′
M19	NGC 6273	—		Globular cluster	28.7	Ophiuchus	6.8	17′	17^{h} 02^{m} 37.7^{s}	−26° 16′ 04.6″
M20	NGC 6514	Trifid Nebula		H II region nebula with cluster	5.2	Sagittarius	6.3	28′	18^{h} 02^{m} 23^{s}	−23° 01′ 48″
M21	NGC 6531	Webb's Cross Cluster		Open cluster	4.25	Sagittarius	6.5	14′	18^{h} 04.6^{m}	−22° 30′
M22	NGC 6656	Great Sagittarius Cluster		Globular cluster	9.6–11.6	Sagittarius	5.1	32′	18^{h} 36^{m} 23.9^{s}	−23° 54′ 17.1″
M23	NGC 6494	—		Open cluster	2.15	Sagittarius	5.5	35′	17^{h} 56.8^{m}	−19° 01′
M24	IC 4715	Small Sagittarius Star Cloud		Milky Way star cloud	~10	Sagittarius	2.5	2°x1°	18^{h} 17^{m}	−18° 33′
M25	IC 4725	—		Open cluster	2.0	Sagittarius	4.6	36′	18^{h} 31.6^{m}	−19° 15′
M26	NGC 6694	—		Open cluster	5.0	Scutum	8.0	14′	18^{h} 45.2^{m}	−09° 24′
M27	NGC 6853	Dumbbell Nebula		Planetary nebula	1.148–1.52	Vulpecula	7.4	8.0′ × 5.6′	19^{h} 59^{m} 36.3^{s}	+22° 43′ 16.1″
M28	NGC 6626	—		Globular cluster	17.9	Sagittarius	6.8	11.2′	18^{h} 24^{m} 32.9^{s}	−24° 52′ 11.4″
M29	NGC 6913	Cooling Tower Cluster		Open cluster	7.2	Cygnus	7.1	7′	20^{h} 23^{m} 56^{s}	+38° 31′ 24″
M30	NGC 7099	Jellyfish Cluster		Globular cluster	27.8–31	Capricornus	7.2	12′	21^{h} 40^{m} 22.1^{s}	−23° 10′ 47.5″
M31	NGC 224	Andromeda Galaxy		Spiral galaxy	2,430–2,650	Andromeda	3.4	3.17° × 1°	00^{h} 42^{m} 44.3^{s}	+41° 16′ 09″
M32	NGC 221	Andromeda Satellite #1		Dwarf elliptical galaxy	2,410–2,570	Andromeda	8.1	8.7′ × 6.5′	00^{h} 42^{m} 41.8^{s}	+40° 51′ 55″
M33	NGC 598	Triangulum/Pinwheel Galaxy		Spiral galaxy	2,380–3,070	Triangulum	5.7	70.8′ × 41.7′	01^{h} 33^{m} 50.0^{s}	+30° 39′ 36.7″
M34	NGC 1039	Spiral Cluster		Open cluster	1.5	Perseus	5.5	35′	02^{h} 42.1^{m}	+42° 46′
M35	NGC 2168	Shoe-Buckle Cluster		Open cluster	2.8	Gemini	5.3	28′	06^{h} 09.1^{m}	+24° 21′
M36	NGC 1960	Pinwheel Cluster		Open cluster	4.1	Auriga	6.3	12′	05^{h} 36^{m} 12^{s}	+34° 08′ 04″
M37	NGC 2099	Salt and Pepper Cluster		Open cluster	4.511	Auriga	6.2	24′	05^{h} 52^{m} 18^{s}	+32° 33′ 02″
M38	NGC 1912	Starfish Cluster		Open cluster	4.2	Auriga	7.4	21′	05^{h} 28^{m} 42^{s}	+35° 51′ 18″
M39	NGC 7092	Pyramid Cluster		Open cluster	0.8244	Cygnus	4.6	29′	21^{h} 31^{m} 42^{s}	+48° 26′ 00″
M40	—	Winnecke 4		Optical Double	0.51	Ursa Major	8.4	51.7″	12^{h} 22^{m} 12.5^{s}	+58° 04′ 59″
M41	NGC 2287	Little Beehive Cluster		Open cluster	2.3	Canis Major	4.5	38′	06^{h} 46.0^{m}	−20° 46′
M42	NGC 1976	Great Orion Nebula		H II region nebula	1.324–1.364	Orion	4.0	65′ × 60′	05^{h} 35^{m} 17.3^{s}	−05° 23′ 28″
M43	NGC 1982	De Mairan's Nebula		H II region nebula (part of the Orion Nebula)	1.3	Orion	9.0	20′ × 15′	05^{h} 35.6^{m}	−05° 16′
M44	NGC 2632	Beehive Cluster or Praesepe		Open cluster	0.577	Cancer	3.7	95′	08^{h} 40.4^{m}	+19° 59′
M45	—	Pleiades, Seven Sisters or Subaru		Open cluster	0.39–0.46	Taurus	1.6	2°	03^{h} 47^{m} 24^{s}	+24° 07′ 00″
M46	NGC 2437	—		Open cluster	5.4	Puppis	6.0	22.8′	07^{h} 41.8^{m}	−14° 49′
M47	NGC 2422	—		Open cluster	1.6	Puppis	4.4	30′	07^{h} 36.6^{m}	−14° 30′
M48	NGC 2548	—		Open cluster	1.5	Hydra	5.5	30′	08^{h} 13.7^{m}	−05° 45′
M49	NGC 4472	—		Elliptical galaxy	53,600–58,200	Virgo	8.4	10.2′ × 8.3′	12^{h} 29^{m} 46.7^{s}	+08° 00′ 02″
M50	NGC 2323	Heart-Shaped Cluster		Open cluster	3.2	Monoceros	5.9	16′	07^{h} 03.2^{m}	−08° 20′
M51	NGC 5194, NGC 5195	Whirlpool Galaxy		Spiral galaxy	19,000–27,000	Canes Venatici	8.4	11.2′ × 6.9′	13^{h} 29^{m} 52.7^{s}	+47° 11′ 43″
M52	NGC 7654	Scorpion Cluster		Open cluster	5.0	Cassiopeia	7.3	13′	23^{h} 24.2^{m}	+61° 35′
M53	NGC 5024	—		Globular cluster	58	Coma Berenices	7.6	13′	13^{h} 12^{m} 55.3^{s}	+18° 10′ 05.4″
M54	NGC 6715	—		Globular cluster	87.4	Sagittarius	7.6	12′	18^{h} 55^{m} 03.3^{s}	−30° 28′ 47.5″
M55	NGC 6809	Specter Cluster		Globular cluster	17.6	Sagittarius	6.3	19′	19^{h} 39^{m} 59.7^{s}	−30° 57′ 53.1″
M56	NGC 6779	—		Globular cluster	32.9	Lyra	8.3	8.8′	19^{h} 16^{m} 35.6^{s}	+30° 11′ 00.5″
M57	NGC 6720	Ring Nebula		Planetary nebula	1.6–3.8	Lyra	8.8	230″ × 230″	18^{h} 53^{m} 35.1^{s}	+33° 01′ 45.0″
M58	NGC 4579	—		Barred Spiral galaxy	~63,000	Virgo	9.7	5.9′ × 4.7′	12^{h} 37^{m} 43.5^{s}	+11° 49′ 05″
M59	NGC 4621	—		Elliptical galaxy	55,000–65,000	Virgo	9.6	5.4′ × 3.7′	12^{h} 42^{m} 02.3^{s}	+11° 38′ 49″
M60	NGC 4649	—		Elliptical galaxy	51,000–59,000	Virgo	8.8	7.4′ × 6.0′	12^{h} 43^{m} 39.6^{s}	+11° 33′ 09″
M61	NGC 4303	Swelling Spiral Galaxy		Spiral galaxy	50,200–54,800	Virgo	9.7	6.5′ × 5.8′	12^{h} 21^{m} 54.9^{s}	+04° 28′ 25″
M62	NGC 6266	Flickering Globular		Globular cluster	22.2	Ophiuchus	6.5	15′	17^{h} 01^{m} 12.6^{s}	−30° 06′ 44.5″
M63	NGC 5055	Sunflower Galaxy		Spiral galaxy	37,000	Canes Venatici	8.6	12.6′ × 7.2′	13^{h} 15^{m} 49.3^{s}	+42° 01′ 45″
M64	NGC 4826	Black Eye Galaxy		Spiral galaxy	22,000–26,000	Coma Berenices	8.5	10.7′ × 5.1′	12^{h} 56^{m} 43.7^{s}	+21° 40′ 58″
M65	NGC 3623	Leo Triplet		Barred Spiral galaxy	41,000–42,000	Leo	9.3	8.7′ × 2.5′	11^{h} 18^{m} 55.9^{s}	+13° 05′ 32″
M66	NGC 3627	Leo Triplet		Barred Spiral galaxy	31,000–41,000	Leo	8.9	9.1′ × 4.2′	11^{h} 20^{m} 15.0^{s}	+12° 59′ 30″
M67	NGC 2682	King Cobra or Golden Eye Cluster		Open cluster	2.61–2.93	Cancer	6.1	30′	08^{h} 51.3^{m}	+11° 49′
M68	NGC 4590	—		Globular cluster	33.6	Hydra	7.8	11′	12^{h} 39^{m} 28.0^{s}	−26° 44′ 38.6″
M69	NGC 6637	—		Globular cluster	29.7	Sagittarius	7.6	10.8′	18^{h} 31^{m} 23.1^{s}	−32° 20′ 53.1″
M70	NGC 6681	—		Globular cluster	29.4	Sagittarius	7.9	8′	18^{h} 43^{m} 12.8^{s}	−32° 17′ 31.6″
M71	NGC 6838	Angelfish Cluster		Globular cluster	13.0	Sagitta	8.2	7.2′	19^{h} 53^{m} 46.5^{s}	+18° 46′ 45.1″
M72	NGC 6981	—		Globular cluster	53.40–55.74	Aquarius	9.3	6.6′	20^{h} 53^{m} 27.7^{s}	−12° 32′ 14.3″
M73	NGC 6994	—		Asterism	~2.5	Aquarius	9.0	2.8′	20^{h} 58^{m} 54^{s}	−12° 38′
M74	NGC 628	Phantom Galaxy		Spiral galaxy	24,000–36,000	Pisces	9.4	10.5′ × 9.5′	01^{h} 36^{m} 41.8^{s}	+15° 47′ 01″
M75	NGC 6864	—		Globular cluster	67.5	Sagittarius	8.5	6.8′	20^{h} 06^{m} 04.8^{s}	−21° 55′ 16.2″
M76	NGC 650, NGC 651	Little Dumbbell Nebula		Planetary nebula	2.5	Perseus	10.1	2.7′ × 1.8′	01^{h} 42.4^{m}	+51° 34′ 31″
M77	NGC 1068	Cetus A or Squid Galaxy		Spiral galaxy	47,000	Cetus	8.9	7.1′ × 6.0′	02^{h} 42^{m} 40.7^{s}	−00° 00′ 48″
M78	NGC 2068	—		Diffuse nebula	1.6	Orion	8.3	8′ × 6′	05^{h} 46^{m} 46.7^{s}	+00° 00′ 50″
M79	NGC 1904	—		Globular cluster	41	Lepus	7.7	8.7′	05^{h} 24^{m} 10.6^{s}	−24° 31′ 27.3″
M80	NGC 6093	—		Globular cluster	32.6	Scorpius	7.3	10′	16^{h} 17^{m} 02.4^{s}	−22° 58′ 33.9″
M81	NGC 3031	Bode's Galaxy		Spiral galaxy	11,400–12,200	Ursa Major	6.9	26.9′ × 14.1′	09^{h} 55^{m} 33.2^{s}	+69° 03′ 55″
M82	NGC 3034	Cigar Galaxy		Starburst galaxy	10,700–12,300	Ursa Major	8.4	11.2′ × 4.3′	09^{h} 55^{m} 52.2^{s}	+69° 40′ 47″
M83	NGC 5236	Southern Pinwheel Galaxy		Barred Spiral galaxy	14,700	Hydra	7.6	12.9′ × 11.5′	13^{h} 37^{m} 00.9^{s}	−29° 51′ 57″
M84	NGC 4374	—		Lenticular galaxy	57,000–63,000	Virgo	9.1	6.5′ × 5.6′	12^{h} 25^{m} 03.7^{s}	+12° 53′ 13″
M85	NGC 4382	—		Lenticular galaxy	56,000–64,000	Coma Berenices	9.1	7.1′ × 5.5′	12^{h} 25^{m} 24.0^{s}	+18° 11′ 28″
M86	NGC 4406	—		Lenticular galaxy	49,000–55,000	Virgo	8.9	8.9′ × 5.8′	12^{h} 26^{m} 11.7^{s}	+12° 56′ 46″
M87	NGC 4486	Virgo A		Elliptical galaxy	51,870–55,130	Virgo	8.6	7.2′ × 6.8′	12^{h} 30^{m} 49.4^{s}	+12° 23′ 28.0″
M88	NGC 4501	—		Spiral galaxy	39,000–56,000	Coma Berenices	9.6	6.9′ × 3.7′	12^{h} 31^{m} 59.2^{s}	+14° 25′ 14″
M89	NGC 4552	—		Elliptical galaxy	47,000–53,000	Virgo	9.8	5.1′ × 4.7′	12^{h} 35^{m} 39.8^{s}	+12° 33′ 23″
M90	NGC 4569	Carabin Galaxy		Spiral galaxy	55,900–61,500	Virgo	9.5	9.5′ × 4.4′	12^{h} 36^{m} 49.8^{s}	+13° 09′ 46″
M91	NGC 4548	—		Barred Spiral galaxy	47,000–79,000	Coma Berenices	10.2	5.4′ × 4.3′	12^{h} 35^{m} 26.4^{s}	+14° 29′ 47″
M92	NGC 6341	—		Globular cluster	26.7	Hercules	6.4	14′	17^{h} 17^{m} 07.4^{s}	+43° 08′ 09.4″
M93	NGC 2447	Critter Cluster		Open cluster	3.6	Puppis	6.0	10′	07^{h} 44.6^{m}	−23° 52′
M94	NGC 4736	Crocodile Eye or Cat's Eye Galaxy		Spiral galaxy	14,700–17,300	Canes Venatici	8.2	11.2′ × 9.1′	12^{h} 50^{m} 53.1^{s}	+41° 07′ 14″
M95	NGC 3351	—		Barred Spiral galaxy	31,200–34,000	Leo	9.7	3.1′ × 2.9′	10^{h} 43^{m} 57.7^{s}	+11° 42′ 14″
M96	NGC 3368	—		Spiral galaxy	28,000–34,000	Leo	9.2	7.6′ × 5.2′	10^{h} 46^{m} 45.7^{s}	+11° 49′ 12″
M97	NGC 3587	Owl Nebula		Planetary nebula	2.03	Ursa Major	9.9	3.4′ × 3.3′	11^{h} 14^{m} 47.7^{s}	+55° 01′ 08.5″
M98	NGC 4192	—		Spiral galaxy	44,400	Coma Berenices	10.1	9.8′ × 2.8′	12^{h} 13^{m} 48.3^{s}	+14° 54′ 01.7″
M99	NGC 4254	St. Catherine's Wheel		Spiral galaxy	44,700–55,700	Coma Berenices	9.9	5.4′ × 4.7′	12^{h} 18^{m} 49.6^{s}	+14° 24′ 59″
M100	NGC 4321	Mirror Galaxy		Spiral galaxy	55,000	Coma Berenices	9.3	7.4′ × 6.3′	12^{h} 22^{m} 54.9^{s}	+15° 49′ 21″
M101	NGC 5457	Pinwheel Galaxy		Spiral galaxy	19,100–22,400	Ursa Major	7.9	28.8′ × 26.9′	14^{h} 03^{m} 12.6^{s}	+54° 20′ 57″
M102	NGC 5866	Spindle Galaxy		Lenticular galaxy	50,000	Draco	9.9	4.7′ × 1.9′	15^{h} 06^{m} 29.5^{s}	+55° 45′ 48″
M103	NGC 581	—		Open cluster	10	Cassiopeia	7.4	6′	01^{h} 33.2^{m}	+60° 42′
M104	NGC 4594	Sombrero Galaxy		Spiral galaxy	28,700–30,900	Virgo	8.0	9′ × 4′	12^{h} 39^{m} 59.4^{s}	−11° 37′ 23″
M105	NGC 3379	—		Elliptical galaxy	30,400–33,600	Leo	9.3	5.4′ × 4.8′	10^{h} 47^{m} 49.6^{s}	+12° 34′ 54″
M106	NGC 4258	—		Spiral galaxy	22,200–25,200	Canes Venatici	8.4	18.6′ × 7.2′	12^{h} 18^{m} 57.5^{s}	+47° 18′ 14″
M107	NGC 6171	Crucifix Cluster		Globular cluster	20.9	Ophiuchus	7.9	10′	16^{h} 32^{m} 31.9^{s}	−13° 03′ 13.6″
M108	NGC 3556	Surfboard Galaxy		Barred Spiral galaxy	46,000	Ursa Major	10.0	8.7′ × 2.2′	11^{h} 11^{m} 31.0^{s}	+55° 40′ 27″
M109	NGC 3992	Vacuum Cleaner Galaxy		Barred Spiral galaxy	59,500–107,500	Ursa Major	9.8	7.6′ × 4.7′	11^{h} 57^{m} 36.0^{s}	+53° 22′ 28″
M110	NGC 205	Andromeda Satellite #2		Dwarf elliptical galaxy	2,600–2,780	Andromeda	8.5	21.9′ × 11.0′	00^{h} 40^{m} 22.1^{s}	+41° 41′ 07″

== Star chart of Messier objects ==
Star chart depicting the Messier objects plotted on a rectangular grid representing right ascension and declination

== See also ==
- Lists of astronomical objects
- Caldwell catalogue
- Deep-sky object
- Herschel 400 Catalogue
- New General Catalogue
