= SN 2011dh =

Supernova in the Whirlpool Galaxy

- Event type: Supernova
- IIb
- Date: 31 May 2011
- Constellation: Canes Venatici
- Right ascension: 13^{h} 30^{m} 05.08^{s}
- Declination: +47° 10′ 11.2″
- Epoch: J2000
- Host: Whirlpool Galaxy (M51)
- Progenitor: ?
- Progenitor type: yellow supergiant
- Colour (B-V): ?
- Peak apparent magnitude: 12.1
- Other designations: SN 2011dh, [RMS2015] J133005+471010

SN 2011dh was a supernova in the Whirlpool Galaxy (M51). It was discovered on 31 May 2011, with an apparent magnitude 13.5. and confirmed by several sources, including the Palomar Transient Factory. A candidate progenitor was detected in Hubble Space Telescope images. The progenitor may have been a highly luminous yellow supergiant with an initial mass of 18-24 solar masses. The supernova peaked near apparent magnitude 12.1 on 19 June 2011. Emission spectra indicated that the explosion was a type II supernova, in which a massive star collapses once nuclear fusion has ceased in its core.

SN2011dh was the third supernova to be recorded in the Whirlpool galaxy since 1994 (following SN 1994I and SN 2005cs). The supernova frequency in the Milky Way is estimated to be around one event every 40 years.
