= M51 Group =

Galaxy cluster in constellation Canes Venatici

- The Whirlpool Galaxy (M51A), the brightest member of the M51 Group, and M51B, the companion to the Whirlpool Galaxy.

Observation data (Epoch J2000)
- Constellation: Canes Venatici
- Right ascension: 13^{h} 24^{m}
- Declination: 46° 13′
- Brightest member: Whirlpool Galaxy (M51A)
- Number of galaxies: 7–17

Other designations
- NGC 5194 Group, LGG 347, NOGG H 712, NOGG P1 723, NOGG P2 739

The M51 Group is a group of galaxies located in Canes Venatici. The group is named after the brightest galaxy in the group, the Whirlpool Galaxy (M51A). Other notable members include the companion galaxy to the Whirlpool Galaxy (M51B) and the Sunflower Galaxy (M63).

The M51 Group lies within Coma–Sculptor Cloud.

== Members ==
The table below lists galaxies that have been consistently identified as group members in the Nearby Galaxies Catalog, the survey of Fouque et al., the Lyons Groups of Galaxies (LGG) Catalog, and the three group lists created from the Nearby Optical Galaxy sample of Giuricin et al.

Members of the M51 Group
| Name | Type | R.A. (J2000) | Dec. (J2000) | Redshift (km/s) | Apparent Magnitude |
|---|---|---|---|---|---|
| Whirlpool Galaxy (M51A) | SA(s)bc pec | 13^{h} 29^{m} 52.7^{s} | +47° 11′ 43″ | 463 ± 3 | 9.0 |
| M51B (NGC 5195) | SB0 pec | 13^{h} 29^{m} 59.6^{s} | +47° 15′ 58″ | 465 ± 10 | 10.5 |
| NGC 5023 | Scd | 13^{h} 12^{m} 12.6^{s} | +44° 02′ 28″ | 407 ± 1 | 12.9 |
| NGC 5229 | SB(s)d | 13^{h} 34^{m} 02.8^{s} | +47° 54′ 56″ | 364 ± 8 | 14.3 |
| Sunflower Galaxy (M63) | SA(rs)bc | 13^{h} 15^{m} 49.3^{s} | +42° 01′ 45″ | 504 ± 4 | 9.3 |
| UGC 8313 | SB(s)c | 13^{h} 13^{m} 53.9^{s} | +42° 12′ 31″ | 593 ± 4 | 14.4 |
| UGC 8331 | IAm | 13^{h} 15^{m} 30.3^{s} | +47° 29′ 56″ | 260 ± 5 | 14.6 |

Other probable members (galaxies listed in two or more of the lists from the above references) include IC 4263 and UGC 8320. The exact membership is somewhat uncertain.

== Nearby Groups ==
The M51 Group is located to the southeast of the M101 Group and the NGC 5866 Group. The distances to these three groups (as determined from the distances to the individual member galaxies) are similar, which suggests that the M51 Group, the M101 Group, and the NGC 5866 Group are actually part of a large, loose, elongated structure. However, most group identification methods (including those used by the references cited above) identify these three groups as separate entities.

== See also ==
- Virgo Supercluster
