= NGC 3521 =

Intermediate spiral galaxy in the constellation Leo similar to the Milky Way

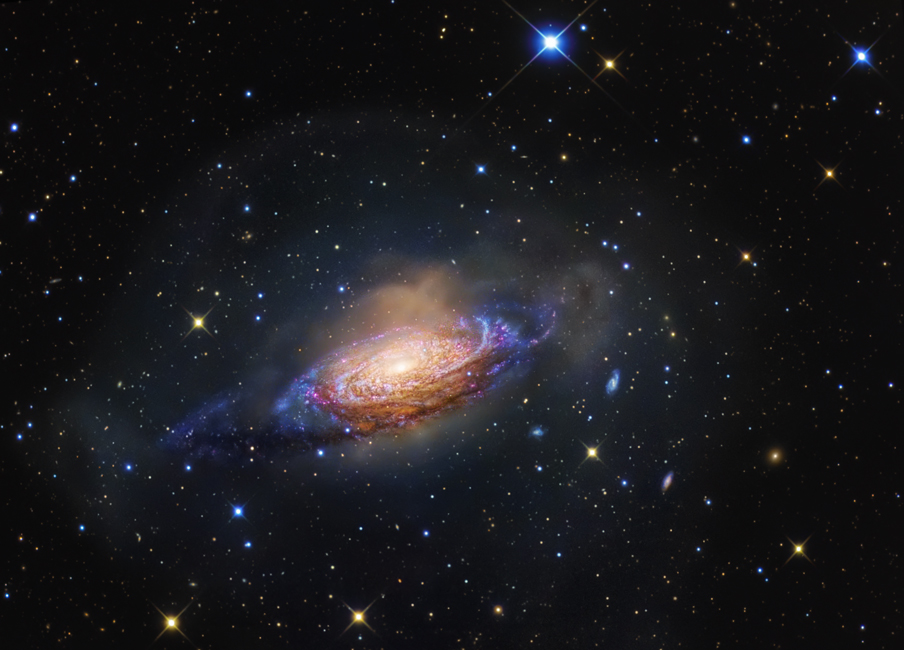
- NGC 3521 imaged by R Jay GaBany

Observation data (J2000 epoch)
- Constellation: Leo
- Right ascension: 11^{h} 05^{m} 48.581^{s}
- Declination: –00° 02′ 09.11″
- Redshift: 0.002672
- Heliocentric radial velocity: 801 km/s
- Distance: 37.17 ± 1.83 Mly (11.395 ± 0.56 Mpc)
- Apparent magnitude (V): 9.2

Characteristics
- Type: SAB(rs)bc
- Size: ~146,000 ly (44.75 kpc) (estimated)
- Apparent size (V): 11.2′ × 5.4′
- Notable features: HII LINER

Other designations
- Bubble Galaxy, IRAS 11032+0014, UGC 6150, MCG +00-28-030, PGC 33550, CGCG 010-074

NGC 3521, also known as the Bubble Galaxy, is a flocculent intermediate spiral galaxy located in the constellation Leo. Its velocity with respect to the cosmic microwave background is 1,167 ± 26 km/s, which corresponds to a Hubble distance of 56.1 ± 4.1 Mly (17.21 ± 1.26 Mpc). However, 26 non-redshift measurements give a much closer distance of 37.17 ± 1.83 Mly (11.395 ± 0.56 Mpc). It was discovered by German-British astronomer William Herschel on 22 February 1784.

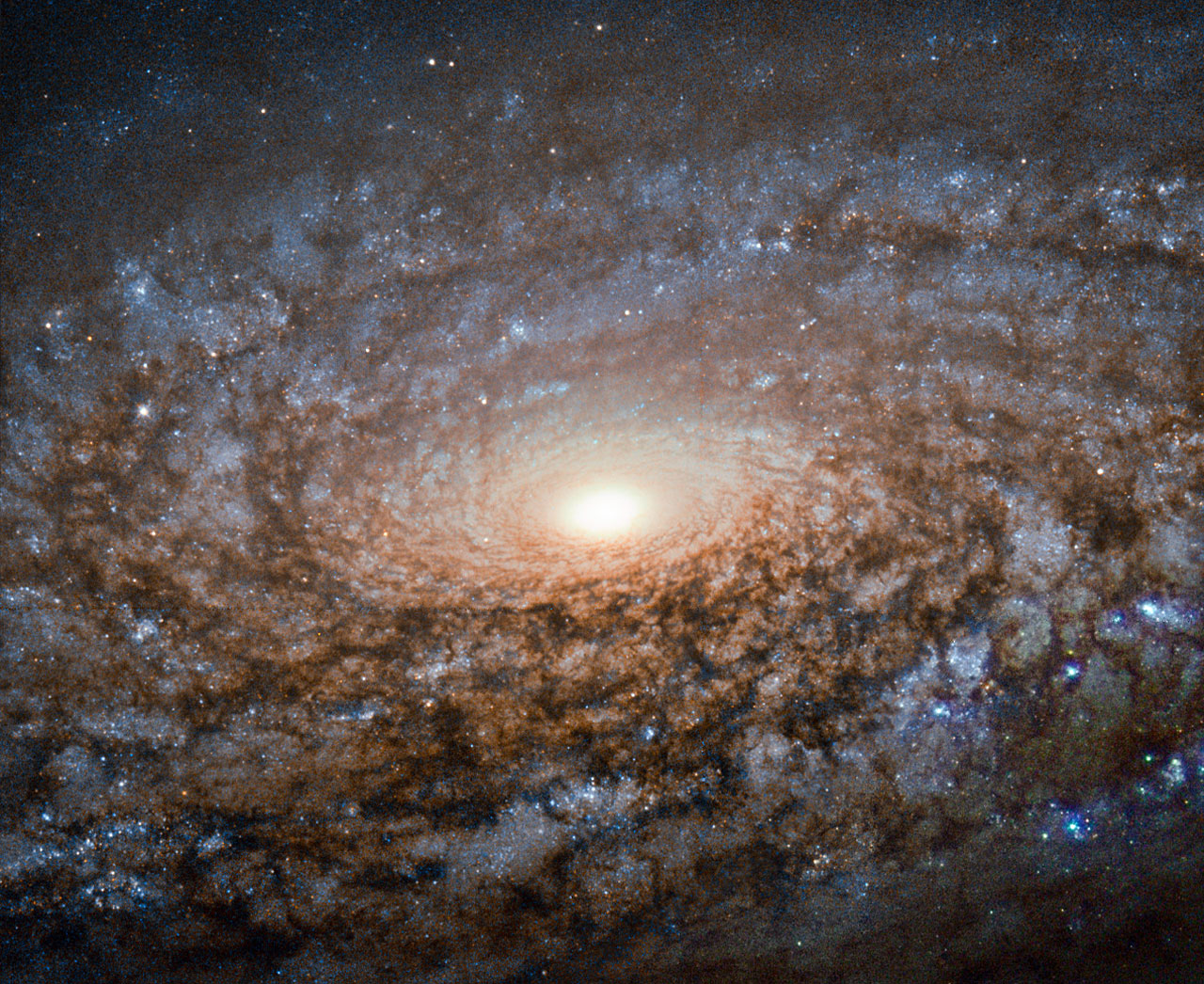
NGC 3521 imaged by the Hubble Space Telescope

NGC 3521 has a morphological classification of SAB(rs)bc, which indicates that it is a spiral galaxy with a trace of a bar structure (SAB), a weak inner ring (rs), and moderate to loosely wound arm structure (bc). The bar structure is difficult to discern, both because it has a low ellipticity and the galaxy is at a high inclination of 72.7° to the line of sight. The relatively bright bulge is nearly 3/4 the size of the bar, which may indicate the former is quite massive. The nucleus of this galaxy is classified as an HII LINER, as there is an H II region at the core and the nucleus forms a low-ionization nuclear emission-line region.

NGC 3521 is structurally similar to the Milky Way; additionally, its supermassive black hole has a similar mass to that of the Milky Way, at about 7 million solar masses.

== Supernova ==
One supernova has been observed in NGC 3521: SN 2024aecx (Type Ic, mag. 14.543) was discovered by ATLAS on 16 December 2024. Astronomers originally classified it as Type IIb, but spectroscopy suggests this supernova is very similar to SN 1994I.
