= UGC 4457 =

Galaxy in the constellation Cancer

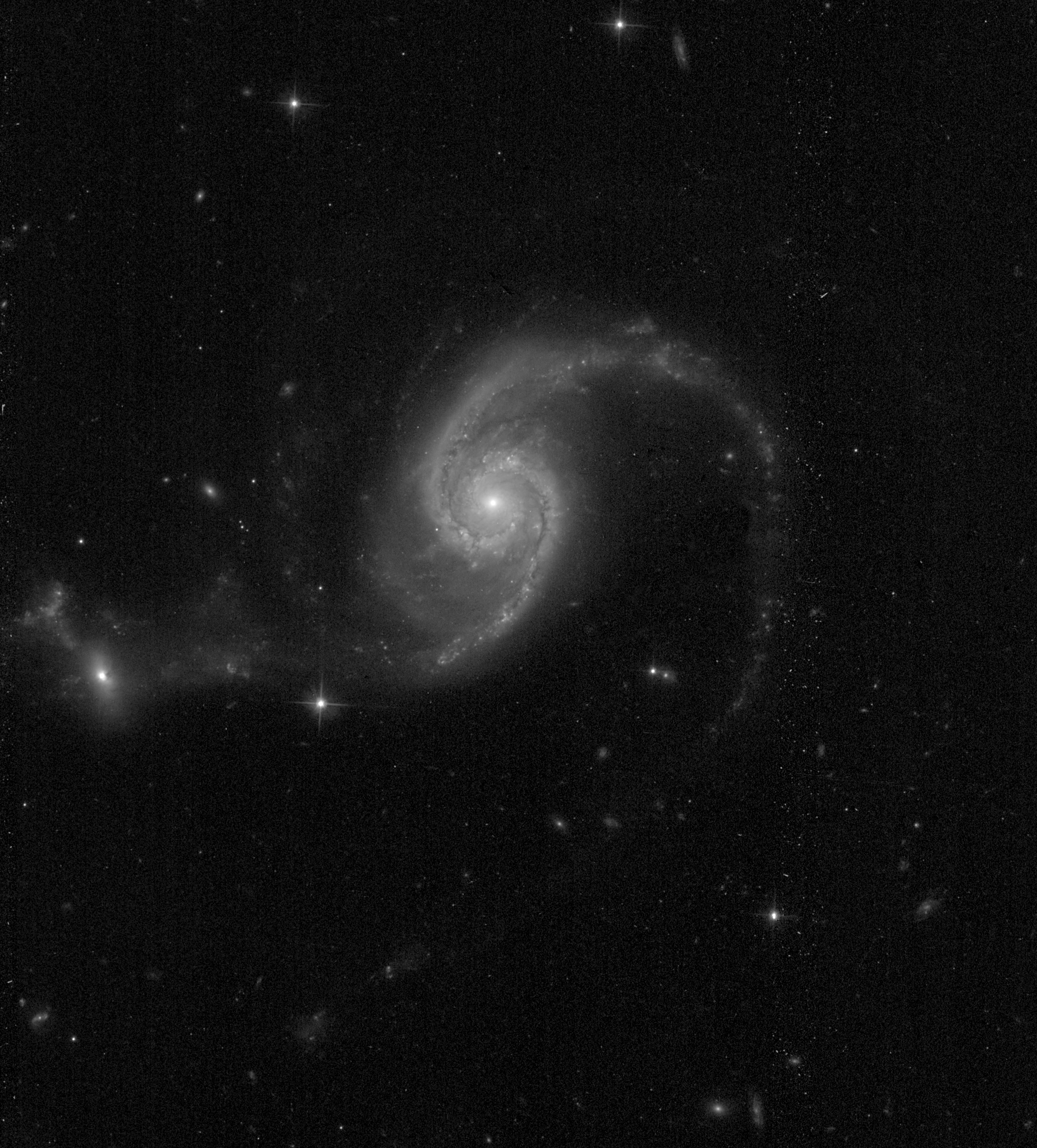
- Hubble Space Telescope image of UGC 4457

Observation data (J2000 epoch)
- Constellation: Cancer
- Right ascension: 08^{h} 31^{m} 57.6^{s}
- Declination: +19° 12′ 41.4″
- Redshift: 0.037179
- Heliocentric radial velocity: 11,162 km/s
- Distance: 500 Mly (153.3 Mpc)

Characteristics
- Type: SAB(rs)pec
- Size: 290,000 ly
- Apparent size (V): 0.96' x 0.50'
- Notable features: Interacting galaxy

Other designations
- UGC 4457 PGC 23935, Arp 58, IRAS 08290+1922, MCG +03-22-017, VV 413, LEDA 23935, Z 89-40

UGC 4457, also known as PGC 23935, is a barred spiral galaxy, containing an active galactic nucleus in the constellation Cancer. It is located 500 million light-years away from the Solar System and has a diameter of 290,000 light-years, making it slightly more massive compared to the Milky Way. The galaxy is moving away at a speed of 11,162 kilometers per second.

UGC 4457 is interacting with the compact galaxy, PGC 23937. Together, they form Arp 58 and are classified under spiral galaxies that have small companions with high surface brightness. In addition, this interacting galaxy pair is also an M51 type system.

UGC 4457 shows disturbed spiral arms, indicating signs of velocity disturbance levels and regions of scattered ionized gas, typically normal for interacting galaxies. A faint spiral bridge can be seen thus representing the remains of an older mode of spiral waves.

== See also ==
- Interacting galaxy
- Barred spiral galaxy
- Active galactic nucleus
- Atlas of Peculiar Galaxies
- Whirlpool Galaxy
- Spiral galaxy
