= NGC 1167 =

Galaxy in the constellation Perseus

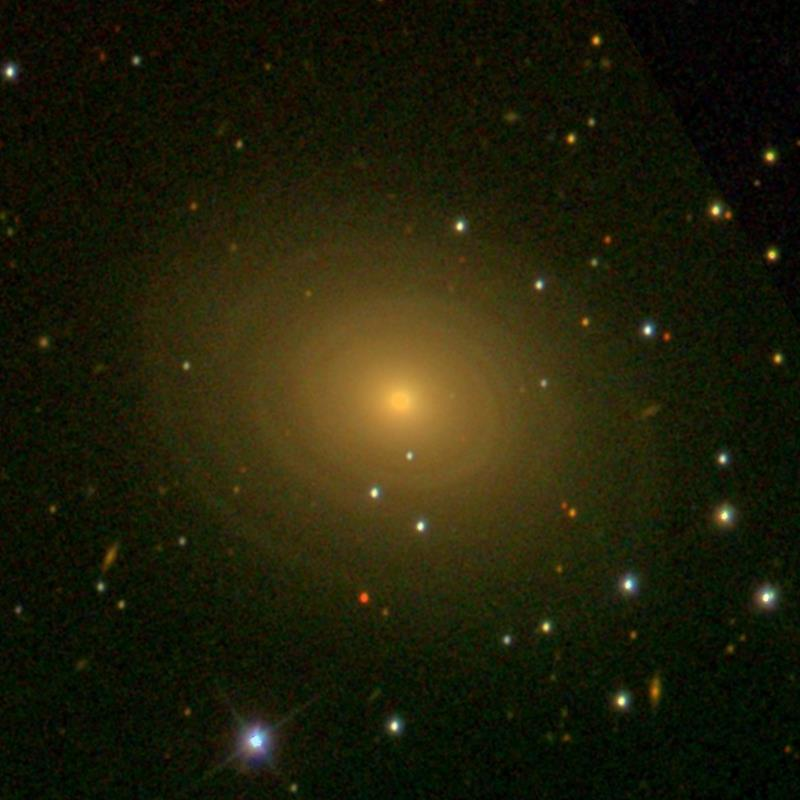
- NGC 1167

Observation data (J2000 epoch)
- Right ascension: 03^{h} 01^{m} 42.3^{s}
- Declination: +35° 12′ 21″
- Redshift: 0.01653 ± 0.00002
- Heliocentric radial velocity: 4954.97 ± 5.09 km/s
- Distance: ~241.3 Mly (74.50 ± 5.22 Mpc)
- Apparent magnitude (V): 12.4
- Apparent magnitude (B): 13.4
- Surface brightness: 14.5 mag/arcmin^{2}

Characteristics
- Apparent size (V): 3.30 x 2.3 arcmin

Other designations
- UGC 2487, MCG +06-07-033, CGCG 524-045, PGC 11425

NGC 1167 is a late type, lenticular, nonbarred galaxy in the constellation Perseus. It was first observed and catalogued in 1784 by the astronomer William Herschel.

== Characteristics ==
NGC 1167 is a massive galaxy with a giant HI disk of D_{HI} = 160 kpc. For comparison, the Milky Way galaxy is approximately 30.6 kpc across. Astronomers suggest NGC 1167 is accumulating gas by satellite accretion, incorporating its neighboring galaxies through fairly recent mergers, expanding its disk. While this galaxy contains significant amount of gas, matter is distributed over a very large area, resulting in a relatively low surface density (less than 2 M⊙/pc).

NGC 1167 has ring-like arcs where star formation is taking place. However its arcs are uncommonly thin and smooth, not showing the expected irregularities observed in star-forming regions of a galaxy's arms. Astronomers suggest this might be due to the lack of O stars within the structure. The nature of the phenomenon is yet not fully comprehended.

== Radio jet ==
In a research paper released in 2022, astronomers reported the detection of a radio jet (named B2 0258+35) on NGC 1167. Given the properties of the detected X-ray emission coming from the jet and its similarity with an extended emission from an active galactic nucleus, the researchers concluded the galaxy is presently a LINER but had an AGN in the past.

== See also ==
Other LINER galaxies include:

- Sombrero Galaxy
- NGC 5195
- Messier 94
