= NGC 7032 =

Spiral galaxy in the constellation Pavo

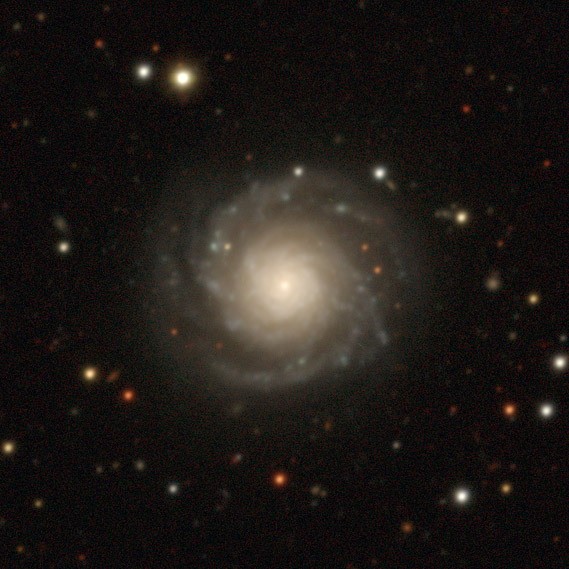
- The spiral galaxy NGC 7032.

Observation data (J2000 epoch)
- Constellation: Pavo
- Right ascension: 21^{h} 15^{m} 22.9^{s}
- Declination: −68° 17′ 16″
- Redshift: 0.010871
- Heliocentric radial velocity: 3,259 km/s
- Distance: 1,419 Mly
- Apparent magnitude (V): 13.60

Characteristics
- Type: SA(r)c
- Size: ~71,372.56 ly (estimated)
- Apparent size (V): 1.1 x 1.0

Other designations
- ESO 74-26, IRAS 21109-6829, PGC 66427

NGC 7032 is a spiral galaxy located about 140 million light-years away in the constellation Pavo. It has an estimated diameter of 71,370 light-years. NGC 7032 was discovered by astronomer John Herschel on July 20, 1835.

== See also ==
- NGC 5055 – a completely unrelated spiral galaxy
- List of NGC objects (7001–7840)
