= Whirlpool Galaxy =

Galaxy in the constellation Canes Venatici

- Whirlpool Galaxy (M51a), as taken by the European Space Agency, the smaller object in the upper right is NGC 5195 (M51b) (NASA/ESA)

Observation data (J2000.0 epoch)
- Constellation: Canes Venatici
- Right ascension: 13^{h} 29^{m} 52.7^{s}
- Declination: +47° 11′ 43″
- Redshift: 0.001534±0.000007
- Distance: 7.22 ± 2.13 megaparsecs (23.5 ± 6.95 million light-years)
- Apparent magnitude (V): 8.4

Characteristics
- Type: SA(s)bc pec
- Size: 23.58 kpc (76,900 ly) (diameter; 25.0 mag/arcsec^{2} B-band isophote)
- Apparent size (V): 11.2′ × 6.9′
- Notable features: Interacting with NGC 5195

Other designations
- Question Mark Galaxy, Rosse's Galaxy, M51a, NGC 5194, UGC 8493, PGC 47404, VV 001a, VV 403, Arp 85, GC 3572

The Whirlpool Galaxy, also known as Messier 51a (M51a) or NGC 5194, is an interacting grand-design spiral galaxy with a Seyfert 2 active galactic nucleus. It lies in the constellation Canes Venatici, and was the first galaxy to be classified as a spiral galaxy. It is 31 million light-years (9.5 megaparsecs/Mpc) away and 23.58 kiloparsecs (76,900 ly) in diameter.

The galaxy and its interaction companion, NGC 5195, are easily observed by amateur astronomers; the two galaxies may be seen with binoculars. The Whirlpool Galaxy and NGC 5195 have been extensively observed by professional astronomers, who study the pair to understand galaxy structure (particularly structure associated with the spiral arms) and galaxy interactions. This pair is among the most famous and relatively close interacting systems, and thus is a favorite subject of galaxy interaction models.

== Discovery ==
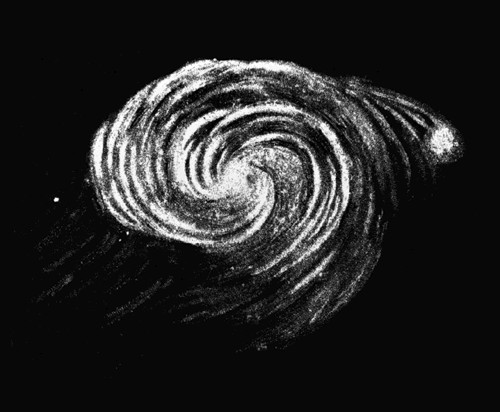
Sketch of M51 by Lord Rosse in 1845

What later became known as the Whirlpool Galaxy was discovered on October 13, 1773, by Charles Messier while hunting for objects that could confuse comet hunters, and was designated in Messier's catalogue as M51. William Parsons, 3rd Earl of Rosse, employing a 72-inch (1.8 m) reflecting telescope at Birr Castle, Ireland, found that the Whirlpool possessed a spiral structure, the first "nebula" to be known to have one. These "spiral nebulae" were not recognized as galaxies until Edwin Hubble was able to observe Cepheid variables in some of these spiral nebulae, which provided evidence that they were so far away that they must be entirely separate galaxies.

The advent of radio astronomy and subsequent radio images of M51 unequivocally demonstrated that the Whirlpool and its companion galaxy are indeed interacting. Radiowaves permitted to map the distribution of gas in the two galaxies, understanding that they are physically connected. Sometimes the designation M51 is used to refer to the pair of galaxies, in which case the individual galaxies may be referred to as M51a (NGC 5194) and M51b (NGC 5195).

== Visual appearance ==
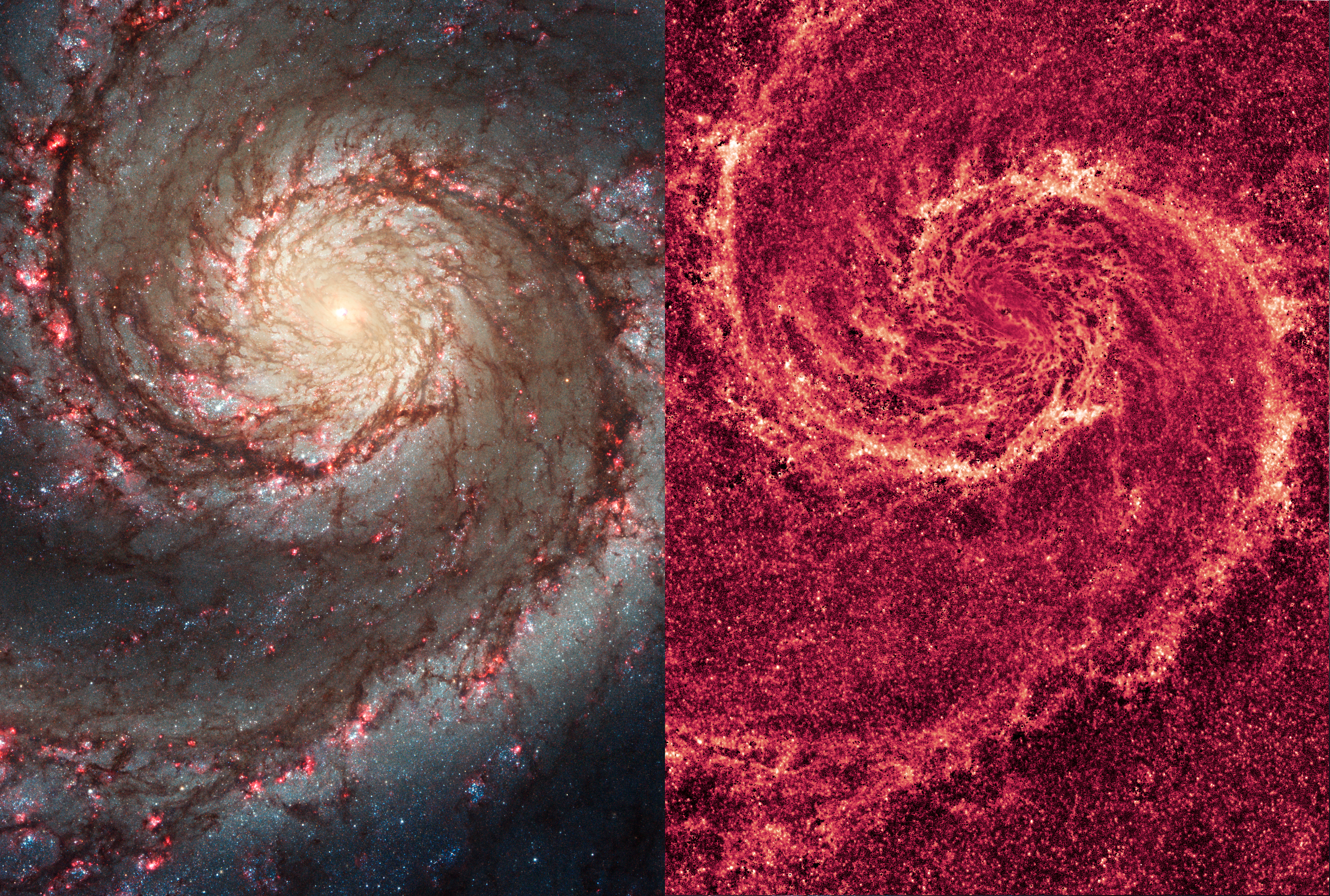
The image of the Whirlpool Galaxy in visible light (left) and infrared light (right)

Deep in the constellation Canes Venatici, M51 is often found by finding the easternmost star of the Big Dipper, Alkaid, and going 3.5° southwest. Its declination is, rounded, +47°, making it circumpolar (never setting) for observers above the 43rd parallel north; (Note: 47 out of 90 degrees north of the celestial equator. Thus its light emits as far south, to a good minimal cumulation of 15° above the horizon, once a day, on the 28th parallel south.) it reaches a high altitude throughout this hemisphere making it an accessible object from the early hours in November through to the end of May, after which observation is more coincidental in modest latitudes with the risen sun (due to the Sun approaching to and receding from its right ascension, specifically figuring in Gemini, just to the north).

M51 is visible through binoculars under dark sky conditions, and it can be resolved in detail with modern amateur telescopes. When seen through a 100 mm telescope the basic outlines of M51 (limited to 5×6') and its companion are visible. Under dark skies, and with a moderate eyepiece through a 150 mm telescope, M51's intrinsic spiral structure can be detected. With larger (>300 mm) instruments under dark sky conditions, the various spiral bands are apparent with HII regions visible, and M51 can be seen to be attached to M51B.

As is usual for galaxies, the true extent of its structure can only be gathered from inspecting photographs; long exposures reveal a large nebula extending beyond the visible circular appearance. In 1984, thanks to the high-speed detector—the so-called image-photon-counting-system (IPCS)—developed jointly by the CNRS Laboratoire d'Astronomie Spatiald (L.A.S.-CNRS) and the Observatoire de Haute Provence (O.H.P.) along with the particularly nice visibility offered by the Canada-France-Hawaii-Telescope (C.F.H.T.) 3.60m Cassegrain focus on the summit of Mauna Kea in Hawaii, Hua et al. detected the double component of the very nucleus of the Whirlpool Galaxy.

In January 2005 the Hubble Heritage Project constructed a 11,477 × 7,965-pixel composite image (shown in the infobox above) of M51 using Hubble's ACS instrument. The image highlights the galaxy's spiral arms, and shows detail into some of the structures inside the arms.

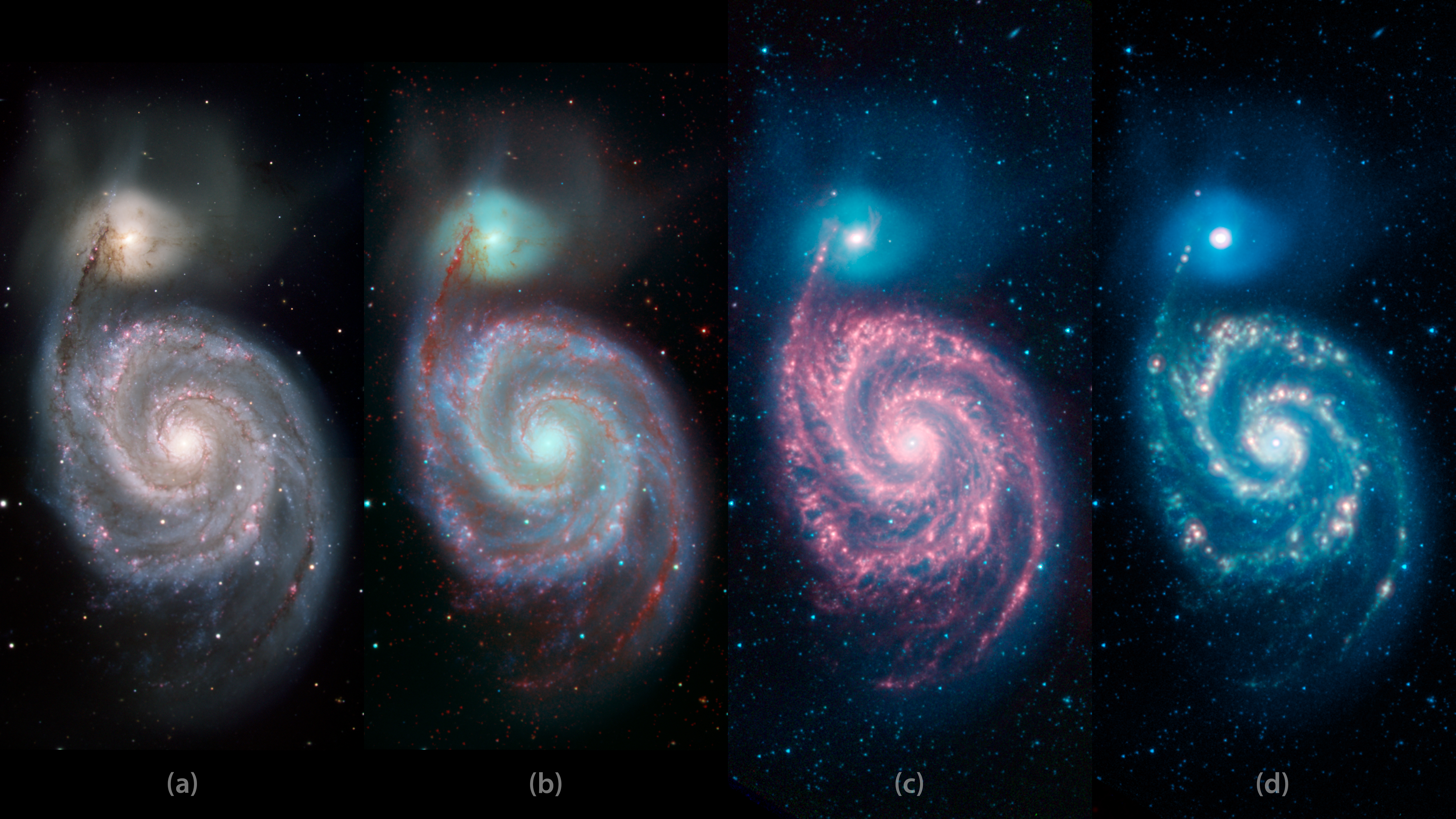
Whirlpool Galaxy – Observed in Various Light a) 0.4 and 0.7 μm; b) vis-blue/green and IR-red; c) 3.6, 4.5, and 8 μm; d) 24 μm

In 2022, the James Webb Space Telescope observed the galaxy using MIRI for the Feedback in Emerging extrAgalactic Star clusTers (JWST-FEAST) project.

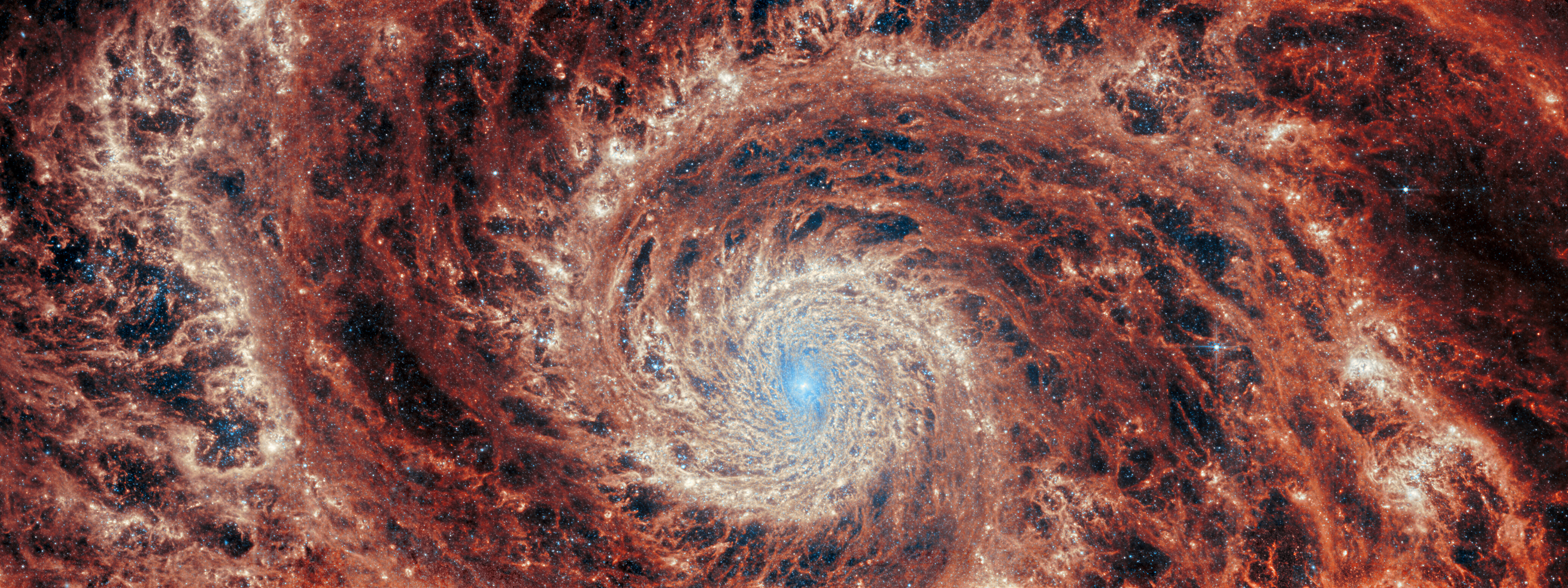
2022 James Webb Space Telescope image of the galactic center.

== Properties ==
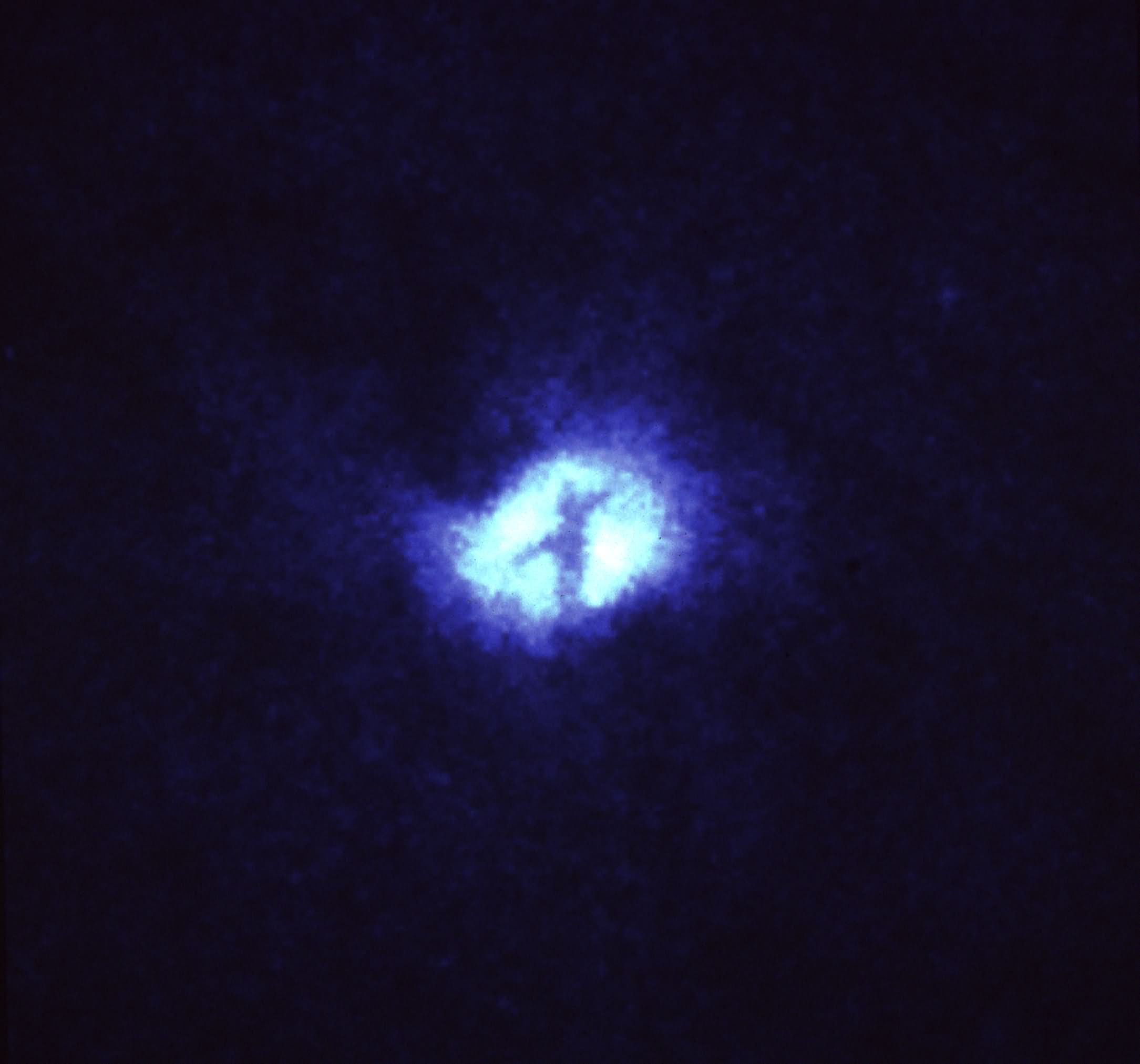
A 1992 Hubble image showing M51's active galactic nucleus, occluded by some dust

The Whirlpool Galaxy lies at a distance of 23 to 31 million light-years from Earth. Based on the 1991 measurement by the Third Reference Catalogue of Bright Galaxies using the D_{25} isophote at the B-band, the Whirlpool Galaxy has a diameter of 23.58 kiloparsecs (76,900 light-years). Overall, the galaxy is about 88% the size of the Milky Way. Its mass is estimated to be 160 billion solar masses, or around 10.3% of the mass of Milky Way Galaxy. It's believed to be an estimated 400 million years old.

A black hole, once thought to be surrounded by a ring of dust, but now believed to be partially occluded by dust instead, exists at the heart of the spiral. A pair of ionization cones extend from the active galactic nucleus.

=== Spiral structure ===
The Whirlpool Galaxy has two prominent spiral arms that wind clockwise. One arm deviates from a constant angle significantly. The pronounced spiral structure of the Whirlpool Galaxy is believed to be the result of the close interaction between it and its companion galaxy NGC 5195, which may have passed through the main disk of M51 about 500 to 600 million years ago. In this proposed scenario, NGC 5195 came from behind M51 through the disk towards the observer and made another disk crossing as recently as 50 to 100 million years ago until it is where we observe it to be now, slightly behind M51.

=== Tidal features ===
As a result of the Whirlpool Galaxy's interaction with NGC 5195, a variety of tidal features have been created. The largest of these features is the so-called Northwest plume, which extends out to 43 kiloparsecs (140,000 light-years) from the galaxy's center. This plume is uniform in color and likely originated from the Whirlpool Galaxy itself due to having diffuse gas. Adjacent to it are two other plumes that have a slightly bluer color, referred to as the Western plumes due to their location.

In 2015, a study discovered two new tidal features caused by the interaction between the Whirlpool Galaxy and NGC 5195, the "Northeast plume" and the "South plume". The study remarks that a simulation that takes into account only one passage of NGC 5195 into the Whirlpool Galaxy will fail to produce an analogue to the Northeast tail. In contrast, the multiple-passage simulations made by Salo and Laurikainen et al. reproduce the northeast plume.

=== Star formation ===
The central region of M51 appears to be undergoing a period of enhanced star formation. The present efficiency of star formation, defined as the ratio of mass of new stars to the mass of star-forming gas, is only ~1%, quite comparable to the global value for the Milky Way and other galaxies. It is estimated that the current high rate of star formation can last no more than another 100 million years or so. Similarly, the spiral arms are experiencing high levels of star formation, as well as the space along the arms.

=== Transient events ===
Three supernovae have been observed in the Whirlpool Galaxy:

In 1994, SN 1994I was observed in the Whirlpool Galaxy. It was classified as Type Ic, indicating that its progenitor star was very massive and had already shed much of its mass, and its brightness peaked at apparent magnitude 12.91.

In June 2005, Wolfgang Kloehr discovered the Type II supernova SN 2005cs in the Whirlpool Galaxy, peaking at apparent magnitude 14.

On 31 May 2011 a Type II supernova was detected in the Whirlpool Galaxy, peaking at magnitude 12.1. This supernova, designated SN 2011dh, showed a spectrum much bluer than average, with P Cygni profiles, which indicate rapidly expanding material, in its hydrogen-Balmer lines. The progenitor was probably a yellow supergiant and not a red or blue supergiant, which are thought to be the most common supernova progenitors.

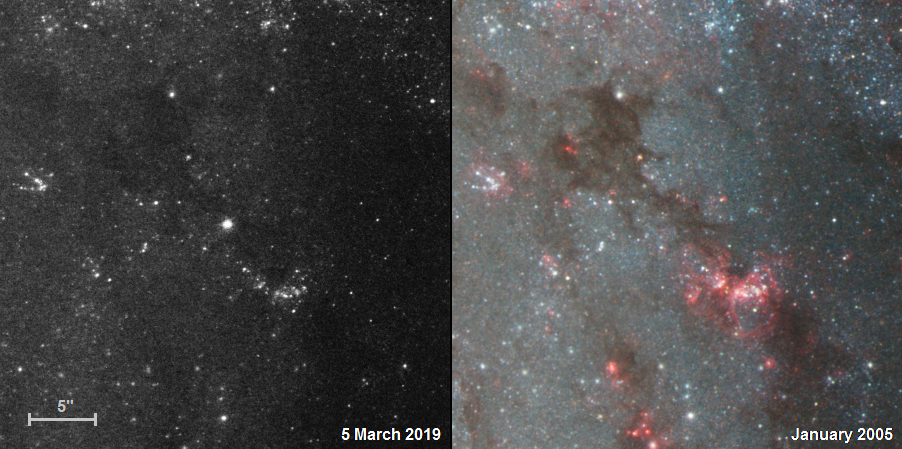
Supernova impostor AT2019abn, imaged by the Hubble Space Telescope

On 22 January 2019, a supernova impostor, designated AT 2019abn, was discovered in Messier 51. The transient was later identified as a luminous red nova. The progenitor star was detected in archival Spitzer Space Telescope infrared images. No object could be seen at the position of the transient in archival Hubble images, indicating that the progenitor star was heavily obstructed by interstellar dust. 2019abn peaked at magnitude 17, reaching an intrinsic brightness of $M_{r}=-14.9$.

=== Chemical composition ===
Several molecules have been detected inside the Whirlpool Galaxy. So far, hydrogen cyanide (HCN), hydrogen isocyanide (HNC), aldehyde (HCO+) and diazenylium (N2H+) have been detected throughout the Whirlpool galaxy from the center to the spiral arms. However isocyanic acid (HCNO) and ethynal have only been detected within 1 kiloparsec of the galactic center.

=== Planet candidate ===
In September 2020, the detection by the Chandra X-ray Observatory of a candidate exoplanet, named M51-ULS-1b, orbiting the high-mass X-ray binary M51-ULS-1 in this galaxy was announced. If confirmed, it would be the first known instance of an extragalactic planet: a planet outside the Milky Way. The planet candidate was detected by eclipses of the X-ray source (XRS), which consists of a stellar remnant (either a neutron star or a black hole) and a massive star, likely a B-type supergiant. The planet would be slightly smaller than Saturn and orbit at a distance of some tens of astronomical units.

== Companion ==
NGC 5195 (also known as Messier 51b or M51b) is a dwarf galaxy that is interacting with the Whirlpool Galaxy (also known as M51a or NGC 5194). Both galaxies are found in the constellation Canes Venatici, some 31 million light-years away. These two galaxies are among the most extensively researched pairs of interacting galaxies.

== Galaxy group information ==
The Whirlpool Galaxy is the brightest galaxy in the M51 Group, a small group of galaxies that also includes M63 (the Sunflower Galaxy), NGC 5023, and NGC 5229. This small group may actually be a subclump at the southeast end of a large, elongated group that includes the M101 Group and the NGC 5866 Group, although most group identification methods and catalogs identify the three groups as separate entities.

== See also ==
- Messier 101 – another grand-design spiral galaxy
- List of galaxies
- List of Messier objects
