= Marie Machacek =

American astrophysicist

Marie E. Machacek
- Education: University of Iowa, PhD (1973); University of Michigan, MS (1970); Coe College, BA (1969)
- Scientific career
- Fields: Astrophysics
- Workplaces: Smithsonian Astrophysical Observatory

Marie E. Machacek is an astrophysicist conducting research in the High Energy Astrophysics Division of the Smithsonian Astrophysical Observatory. She earned a BA in physics and mathematics from Coe College, in 1969; an MS in physics from the University of Michigan, in 1970; and a PhD in physics from the University of Iowa, in 1973. Her current research explores interacting galaxies and the evolution of galaxies in galaxy groups and clusters. She is also the current coordinator for the SAO Astronomy Intern Program.

Machacek was co-author of a Center for Astrophysics | Harvard & Smithsonian study concerning galaxy NGC 5195 presented in January 2016 at the 227th meeting of the American Astronomical Society (AAS).

Machacek was an Alumni Fellow at the University of Michigan 1974-77. She was on the physics faculty of Northeastern University, 1979-2002. In 2003-2004 she was a Fellow of the Radcliffe Institute for Advanced Study at Harvard University.
