= SN 2024aecx =

Supernova explosion

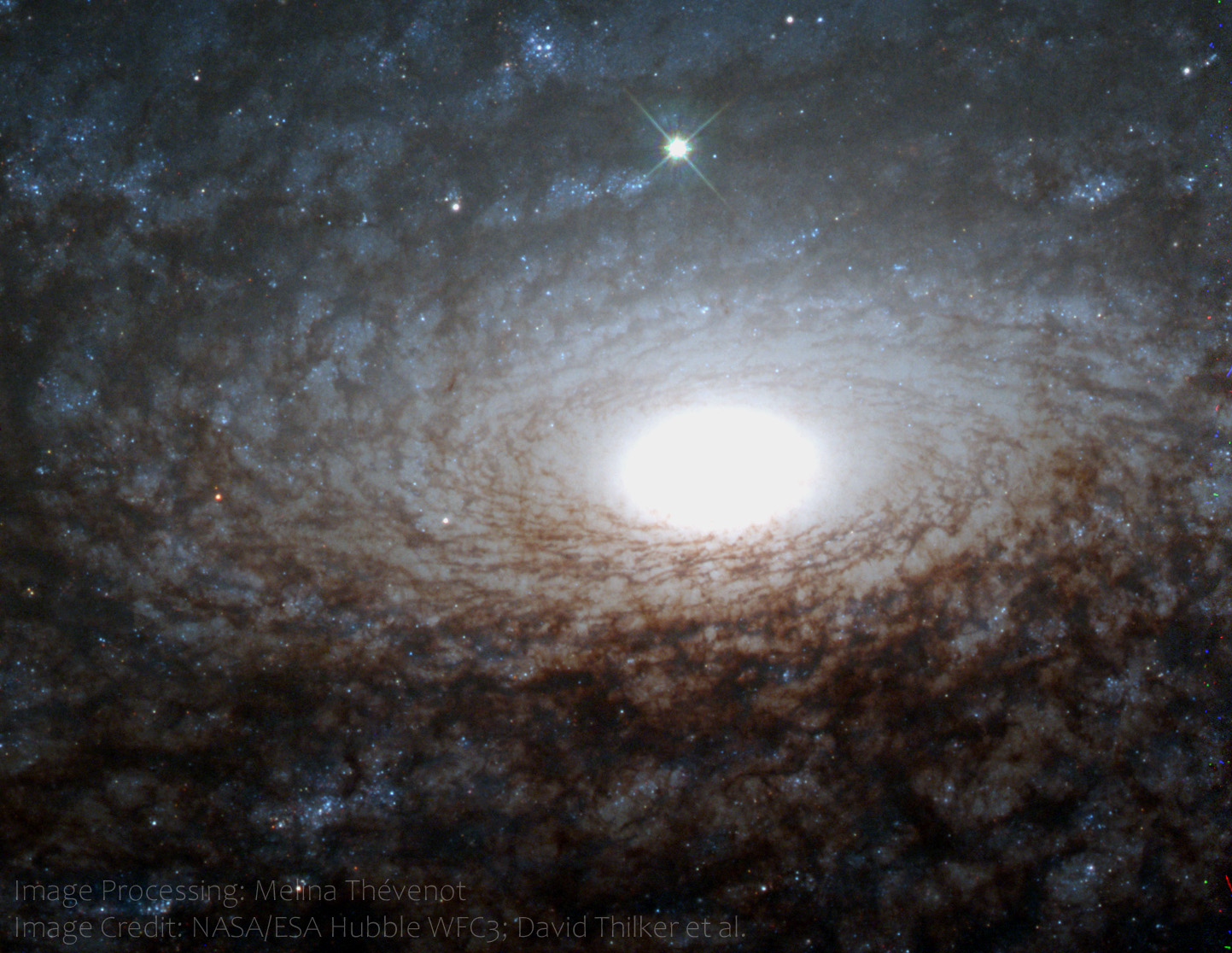
- SN 2024aecx and the host galaxy NGC 3521 imaged by Hubble Space Telescope
- Event type: Supernova
- Ic
- Date: 16 December 2024
- Constellation: Leo
- Right ascension: 11^{h} 05^{m} 49.544^{s}
- Declination: –00° 02′ 05.46″
- Epoch: J2000
- Galactic coordinates: NGC 3521
- Redshift: 0.002665
- Total energy output: 0.16×10^{51} ergs

SN 2024aecx was a Type Ic supernova explosion that occurred inside NGC 3521, an intermediate spiral galaxy located roughly 11 megaparsecs away in the constellation of Leo. It was one of the closest stripped-envelope supernovae (SESNe) to Earth. The progenitor star had a mass of around 169–200 solar radii.

The energy produced by the supernova is estimated to be around 0.16×10^{51} ergs. Around 0.70 solar masses worth of material was ejected and there were approximately 0.15 solar masses worth of nickel-56 produced by the explosion.

== Observational history ==
It was discovered by ATLAS (Asteroid Terrestrial-impact Last Alert System) in the year 2024. The pre-explosion image of SN 2024aecx was available from both the Hubble Space Telescope (HST) and the James Webb Space Telescope (JWST). This means that it could be extensively studied, including the properties of its progenitor star and its environment in remarkable detail.

The spectral evolution of SN 2024aecx was rapid, which is why it is thought to be a stripped supernova or a peculiar Type Ic supernova. Early spectra that were taken showed there were weak signatures of hydrogen lines that would disappear in about 30 days. In all light bands there were two distinctive peaks, with the first peak likely being a result of shock cooling emissions. During the first ~8 days (early epochs) of the event, the color trended towards a redder color with later bluer trends only to then later get redder again ~20 days after the explosion.
