= DDO 169 =

Galaxy in constellation Canes Venatici

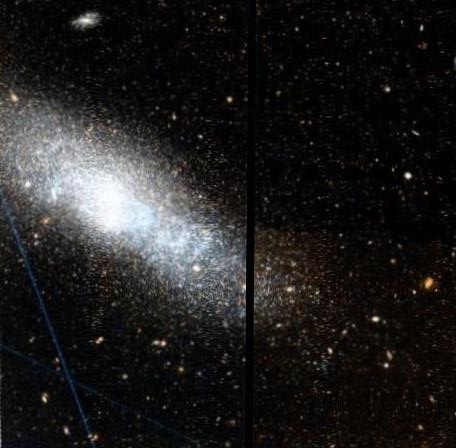
- DDO 169

Observation data (J2000 epoch)
- Constellation: Canes Venatici
- Right ascension: 13^{h} 15^{m} 30.31^{s}
- Declination: +47° 29′ 56.2″
- Redshift: +260 km/s
- Distance: 6.03 / 8.23 Mpc (19.7 / 26.8 million ly)
- Apparent magnitude (V): 14.61

Characteristics
- Type: IAm
- Apparent size (V): 2.7′ × 0.9'

Other designations
- UGC 8331, PGC 46127

DDO 169 (also known as UGC 8331 or PGC 46127) is an irregular galaxy located in the constellation Canes Venatici. It is a member of the M51 Group of galaxies and measures approximately 5 × 1.5 kiloparsecs (16,000 × 5,000 lightyears). The galaxy's large-scale structure is very unorganized and it has two clusters of stars in its outer portions in addition to the cluster in the center. These clusters make it practically impossible to determine the galaxy's rotation curve and contributes to a large variation in distance figures that are derived with different methods. The exact distance to the galaxy is not known, although a 1998 paper estimated the distance as 8.23 megaparsecs.
