= Messier 63 =

Spiral galaxy in the constellation Canes Venatici

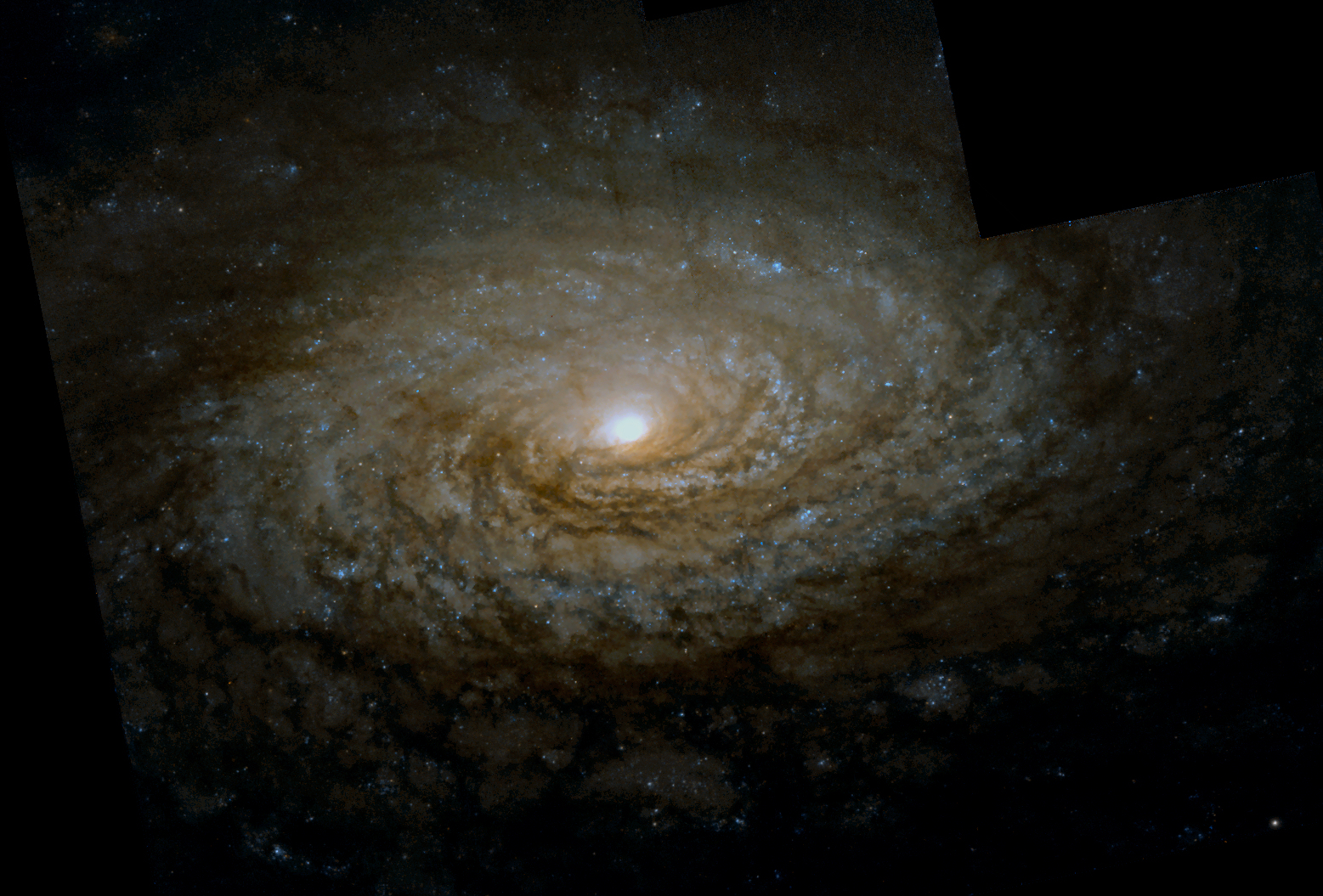
- Image taken by Hubble Space Telescope, on 16 November 2001 at 450 and 814 nm

Observation data (J2000 epoch)
- Constellation: Canes Venatici
- Right ascension: 13^{h} 15^{m} 49.27385^{s}
- Declination: +42° 01′ 45.7261″
- Redshift: 484 km/s
- Distance: 29.3 Mly (8.99 Mpc)
- Group or cluster: M51 Group
- Apparent magnitude (V): 9.3

Characteristics
- Type: SA(rs)bc
- Number of stars: ~400 billion
- Size: 110,000 ly (33.65 kpc) (estimated)
- Apparent size (V): 12.6′ × 7.2′

Other designations
- M63, NGC 5055, PGC 46153, UGC 8334

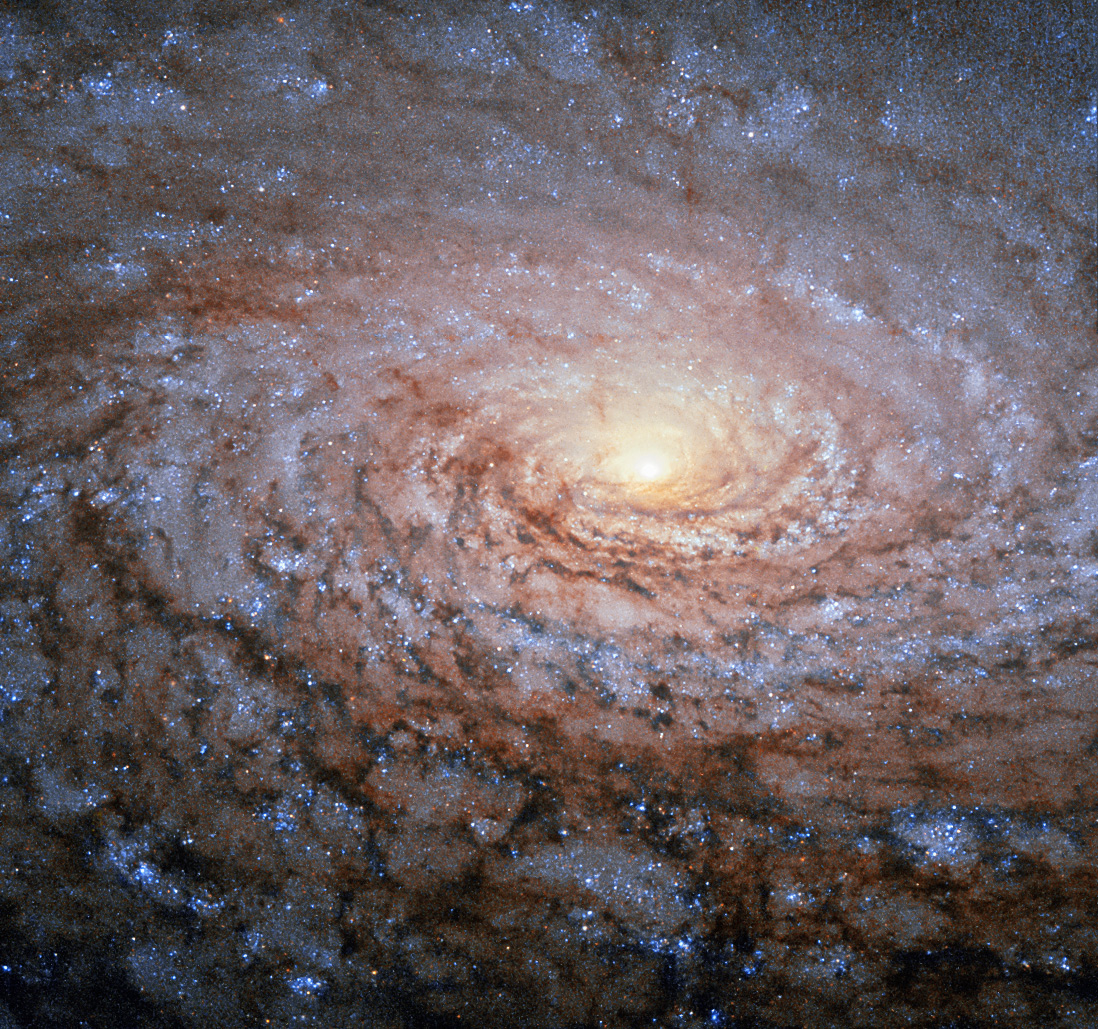
Center of the galaxy

Messier 63 or M63, also known as NGC 5055 or the Sunflower Galaxy, is a spiral galaxy in the northern constellation of Canes Venatici. M63 was first discovered by the French astronomer Pierre Méchain, then later verified by his colleague Charles Messier on 14 June 1779. The galaxy became listed as object 63 in the Messier Catalogue. In the mid-19th century, Anglo-Irish astronomer Lord Rosse identified spiral structures within the galaxy, making this one of the first galaxies in which such structure was identified.

The shape or morphology of this galaxy has a classification of SAbc, indicating a spiral form with no central bar feature (SA) and moderate to loosely wound arms (bc). There is a general lack of large-scale continuous spiral structure in visible light, so it is considered a flocculent galaxy. However, when observed in the near infrared, a symmetric, two-arm structure is seen. Each arm wraps 150° around the galaxy and extends out to 13,000 light-years (4,000 parsecs) from the nucleus.

M63 is a weakly active galaxy with a LINER nucleus – short for 'low-ionization nuclear emission-line region'. This displays as an unresolved source at the galactic nucleus that is cloaked in a diffuse emission. The latter is extended along a position angle of 110° relative to the north celestial pole, and both soft X-rays and hydrogen (H-alpha) emission can be observed coming from along nearly the same direction. The existence of a supermassive black hole (SMBH) at the nucleus is uncertain; if it does exist, then the mass is estimated as (8.5±1.9)×10^{8} M_{☉}, or around 850 million times the mass of the Sun.

Radio observations at the 21-cm hydrogen line show the gaseous disk of M63 extends outward to a radius of 130,000 light-years (40 kiloparsecs), well past the bright optical disk. This gas shows a symmetrical form that is warped in a pronounced manner, starting at a radius of 33,000 light-years (10 kiloparsecs). The form suggests a dark matter halo that is offset with respect to the inner region. The reason for the warp is unclear, but the position angle points toward the smaller companion galaxy, UGC 8313.

The distance to M63, based upon the luminosity-distance measurement is 29,300,000 light-years (8.99 megaparsecs). The radial velocity relative to the Local Group yields an estimate of 15,200,000 light-years (4.65 megaparsecs). Estimates based on the Tully–Fisher relation range over 16,000,000–34,000,000 light-years (5.0–10.3 megaparsecs). The tip of the red-giant branch technique gives a distance of 28,930,000 ± 950,000 light-years (8.87 ± 0.29 megaparsecs). M63 is part of the M51 Group, a group of galaxies that also includes M51 (the 'Whirlpool Galaxy').

== Supernova ==
One supernova has been observed in M63: SN 1971I (Type Ia, mag. 11.8) was discovered by Glenn Jolly on 24 May 1971, and was discovered independently by Roger Clark on 29 May 1971. It reached peak light around 26 May. While the spectrum was consistent with a supernova of Type I, the spectroscopic behavior appeared anomalous.

== Gallery ==
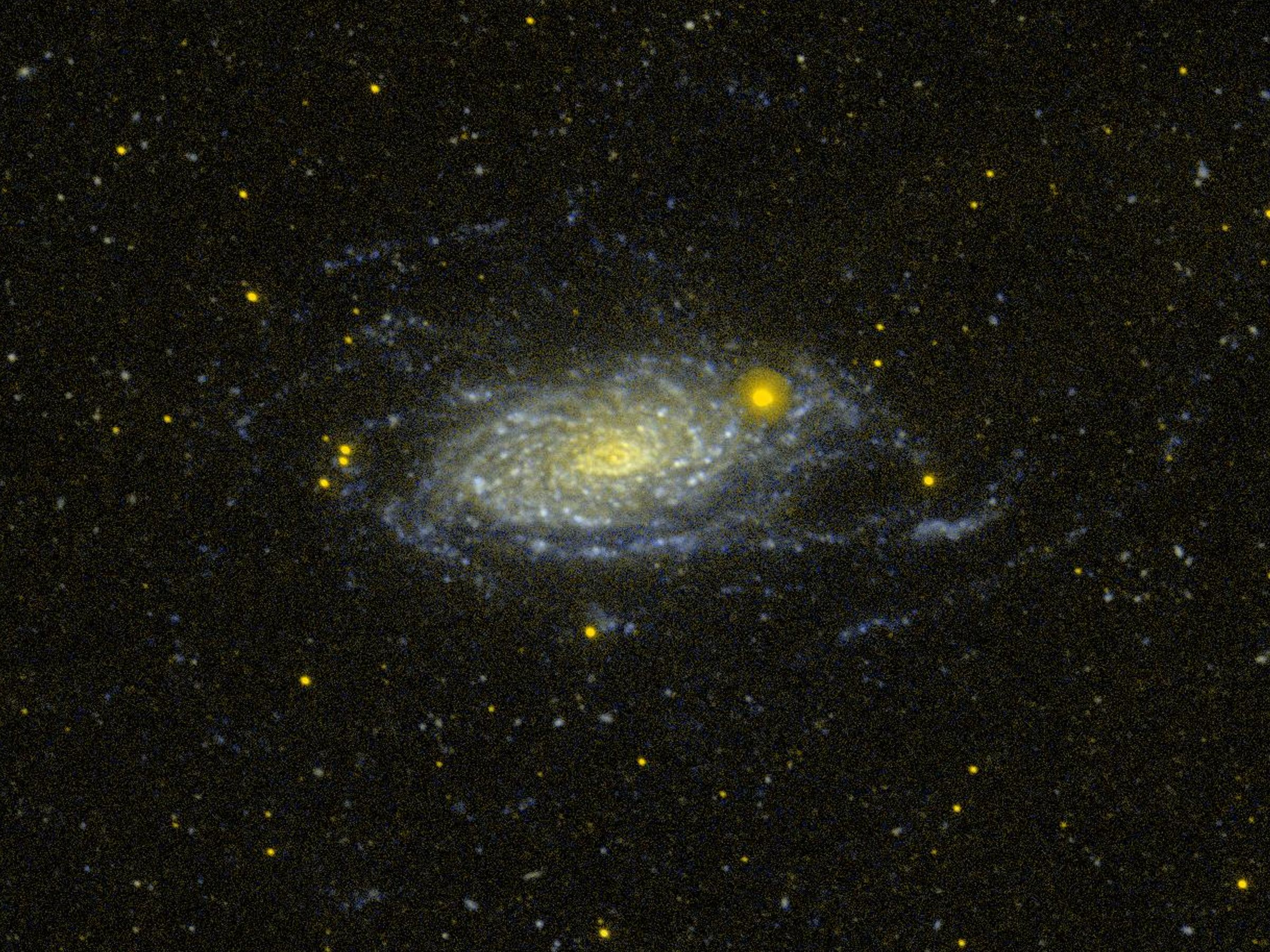
M63 imaged in UV light by the GALEX satellite. The UV light is produced primarily by young, massive stars, so the UV-bright areas are regions where stars are currently forming. Credit NASA / WikiSky

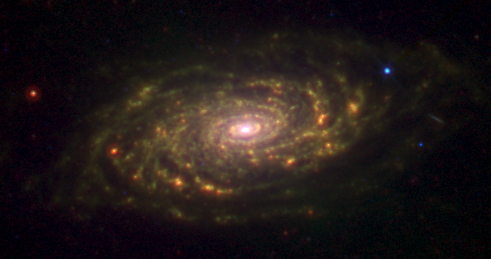
Messier 63 seen in the infrared by the Spitzer Space Telescope. The infrared radiation traces the dust within the spiral arms, which does not radiate visible light. A small dust ring can be seen just outside of the galaxy's center.

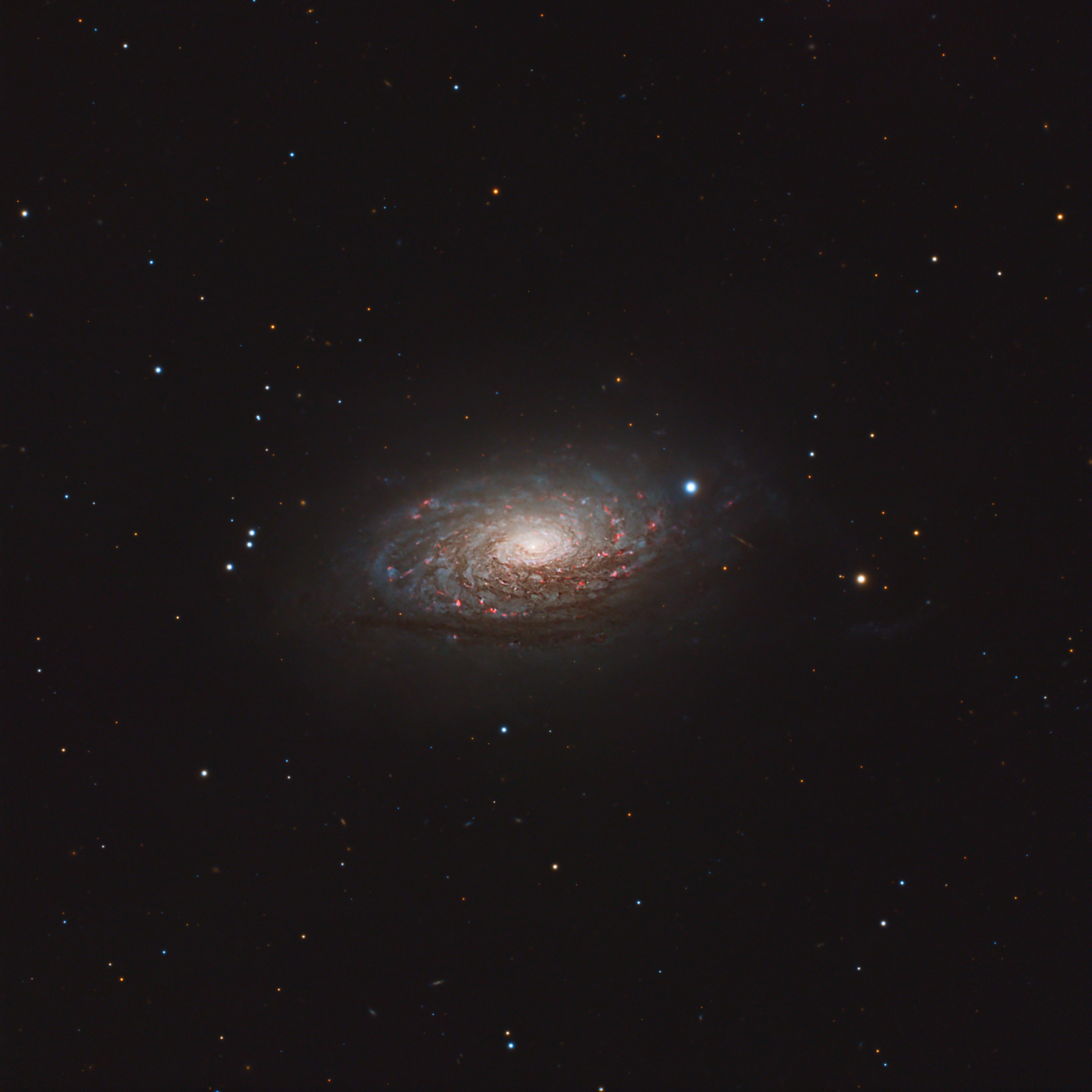
The Sunflower Galaxy M 63 taken in France by amateur astrophotographer Anthony MICHEL

== See also ==
- List of Messier objects
