= SN 2005cs =

2005 supernova event in constellation Canes Venatici

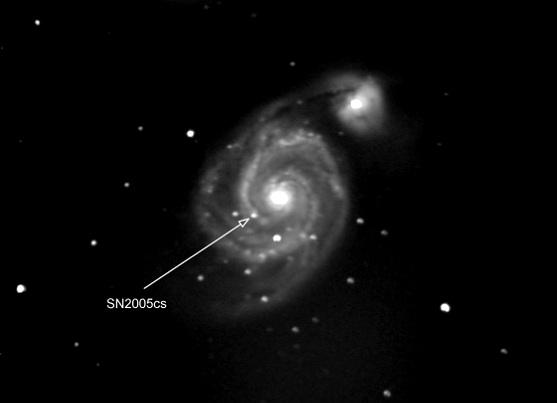
- Event type: Supernova
- Type IIp
- Date: c. 27.4 million years ago (discovered 28 June 2005 by Wolfgang Kloehr)
- Constellation: Canes Venatici
- Right ascension: 13^{h} 29^{m} 53.37^{s}
- Declination: +47° 10′ 28.2″
- Epoch: J2000
- Distance: 27.4 ± 2.3 Mly (8.4 ± 0.7 Mpc)
- Host: Whirlpool Galaxy
- Progenitor: 7–13 M_{☉}
- Progenitor type: Red Supergiant
- Colour (B-V): 0.14 ±0.02
- Peak apparent magnitude: 14.5
- Other designations: SN 2005cs
- Related media on Commons

SN 2005cs was a supernova in the spiral galaxy M51, known as the Whirlpool Galaxy. It was a Type II-P core-collapse supernova, discovered June 28, 2005 by Wolfgang Kloehr, a German amateur astronomer. The event was positioned at an offset of 15″ west and 78″ south of the galactic nucleus of M51. Based on the data, the explosion was inferred to occur 2.8 days before discovery. It was considered under-luminous for a supernova of its type, releasing an estimated 3×10^{50} erg in energy.

The progenitor star was identified from a Hubble Space Telescope image taken January 20–21, 2005. It was a red supergiant with a spectral type in the mid-K to late-M type range and an estimated initial (ZAMS) mass of 9+3
−2 M_{☉}. A higher mass star enshrouded in a cocoon of dust has been ruled out.

== Image gallery ==
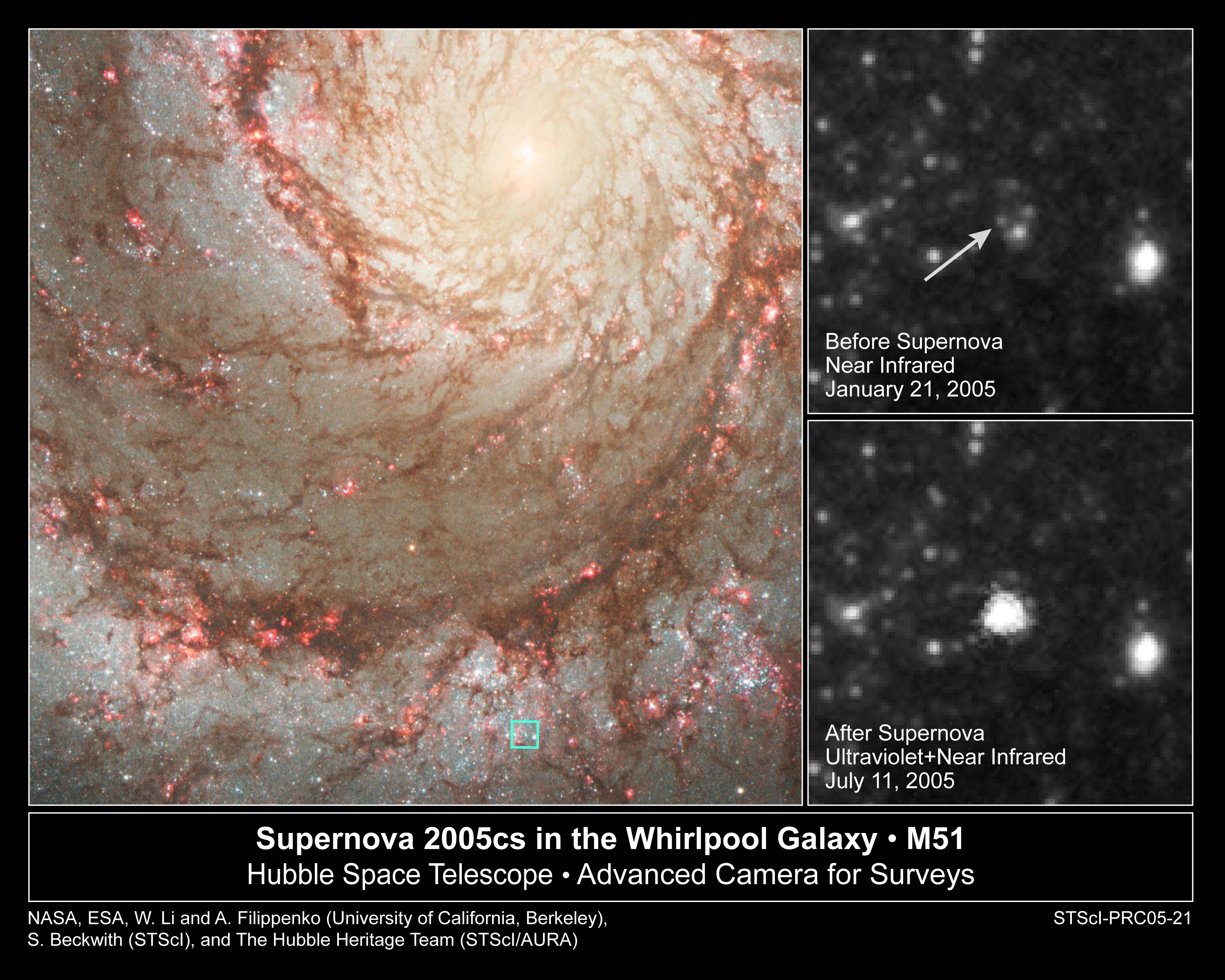
SN 2005cs and its progenitor imaged by the Hubble Space Telescope
