= NGC 5229 =

Spiral galaxy in constellation Canes Venatici

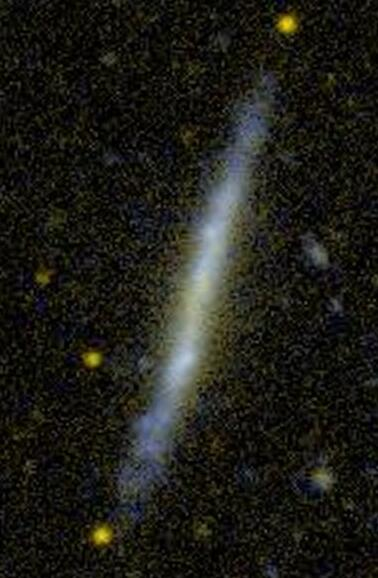
- NGC 5229 by GALEX (ultraviolet)

Observation data (J2000 epoch)
- Constellation: Canes Venatici
- Right ascension: 13^{h} 34^{m} 02.9^{s}
- Declination: +44° 02′ 17″
- Redshift: +363/+461 km/s
- Distance: 5.13 / 7.28 Mpc (16.7 / 23.7 million ly)
- Apparent magnitude (V): 14.3

Characteristics
- Type: SB(s)d
- Apparent size (V): 3.58′ × 0.45'

Other designations
- UGC 8550, PGC 47788, ZWG 246.13, FGC 1638

NGC 5229 is an edge-on spiral galaxy located in the constellation Canes Venatici. It is a member of the M51 Group although in reality it is relatively isolated from other galaxies. The galaxy's disc is somewhat warped and appears to consist of a series of interconnected clusters of stars from our vantage point on Earth. It is approximately 7 kiloparsecs (23,000 light-years) in diameter and is about 13.7 billion years old.
