= IC 4263 =

Edge-on barred spiral galaxy

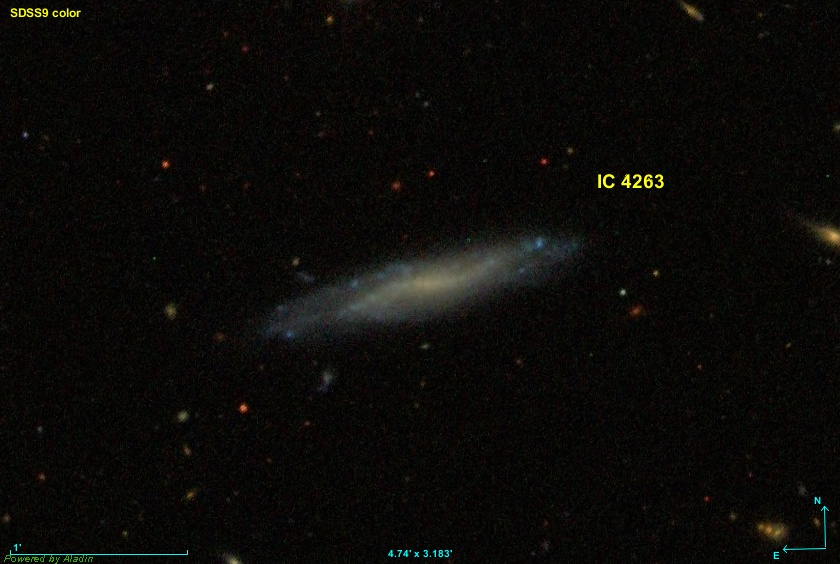
- The IC 4263 galaxy

Observation data (J2000 epoch)
- Constellation: Canes Venatici
- Right ascension: 13^{h} 28^{m} 33.530^{s}
- Declination: +46° 55′ 38.27″
- Redshift: 0.009074
- Heliocentric radial velocity: 2708 km/s
- Distance: 141 million

Characteristics
- Type: SA_B

Other designations
- UGC 8470, MCG +08-25-007, PGC 47270

IC 4263 an edge-on barred spiral galaxy in the constellation Canes Venatici. Its velocity relative to the cosmic microwave background is 2,887 ± 13 km/s, which corresponds to a Hubble distance of 42.6 ± 3.0 Mpc (~139 million light years ). It was discovered by American astronomer James Edward Keeler in 1899.

IC 4263 is class IV in luminosity and has a broad HI 1 line. With a surface brightness of 14.20 mag / am 2, IC 4263 can be described as a low surface brightness (LSB) galaxy. LSB galaxies are diffuse (D) galaxies with a surface brightness less than one magnitude lower than that of the ambient night sky.

To date, six non-redshift measurements give a distance of 40.150 ± 2.601 Mpc (~131 million lightyears), which is within the Hubble distance values.
