= NGC 5023 =

Galaxy in constellation Canes Venatici

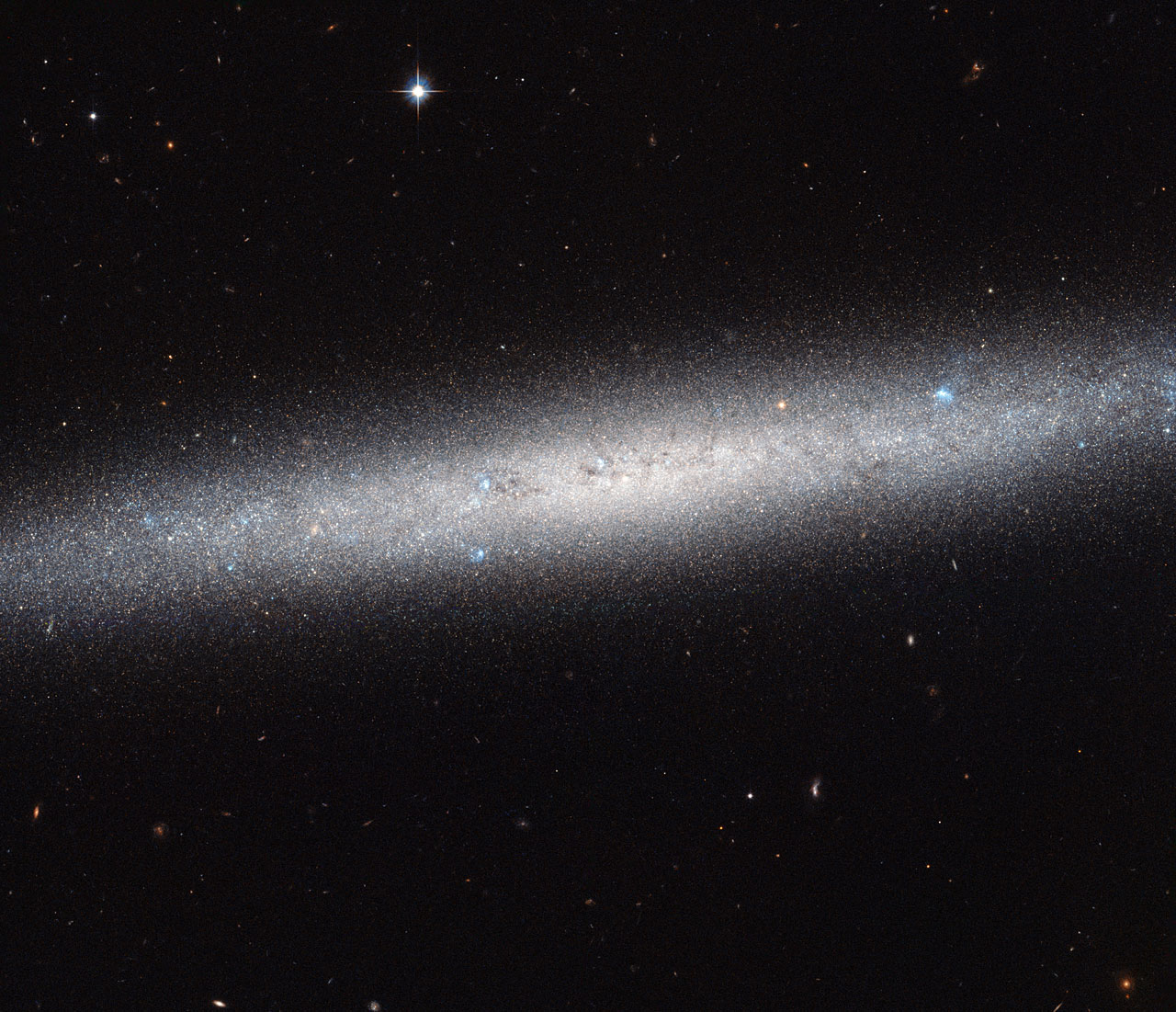
- NGC 5023 by GALEX sky survey

Observation data (J2000 epoch)
- Constellation: Canes Venatici
- Right ascension: 13^{h} 12^{m} 11.8^{s}
- Declination: +44° 02′ 17″
- Redshift: +407/+476 km/s
- Distance: 5.4 / 8 Mpc (17.6 / 26.1 million ly)
- Apparent magnitude (V): 12.82

Characteristics
- Type: Scd
- Apparent size (V): 6.1′ × 0.8'

Other designations
- UGC 8286, PGC 45849, FGC 1578

NGC 5023 is an edge-on spiral galaxy located in the constellation Canes Venatici. It is considered a member of the M51 Group although it is actually relatively isolated from other galaxies. It is approximately 15 kiloparsecs (49,000 light-years) across and contains more than 200 billion stars with an apparent magnitude of greater than 23.5.
