= Low-ionization nuclear emission-line region =

Type of galactic nucleus

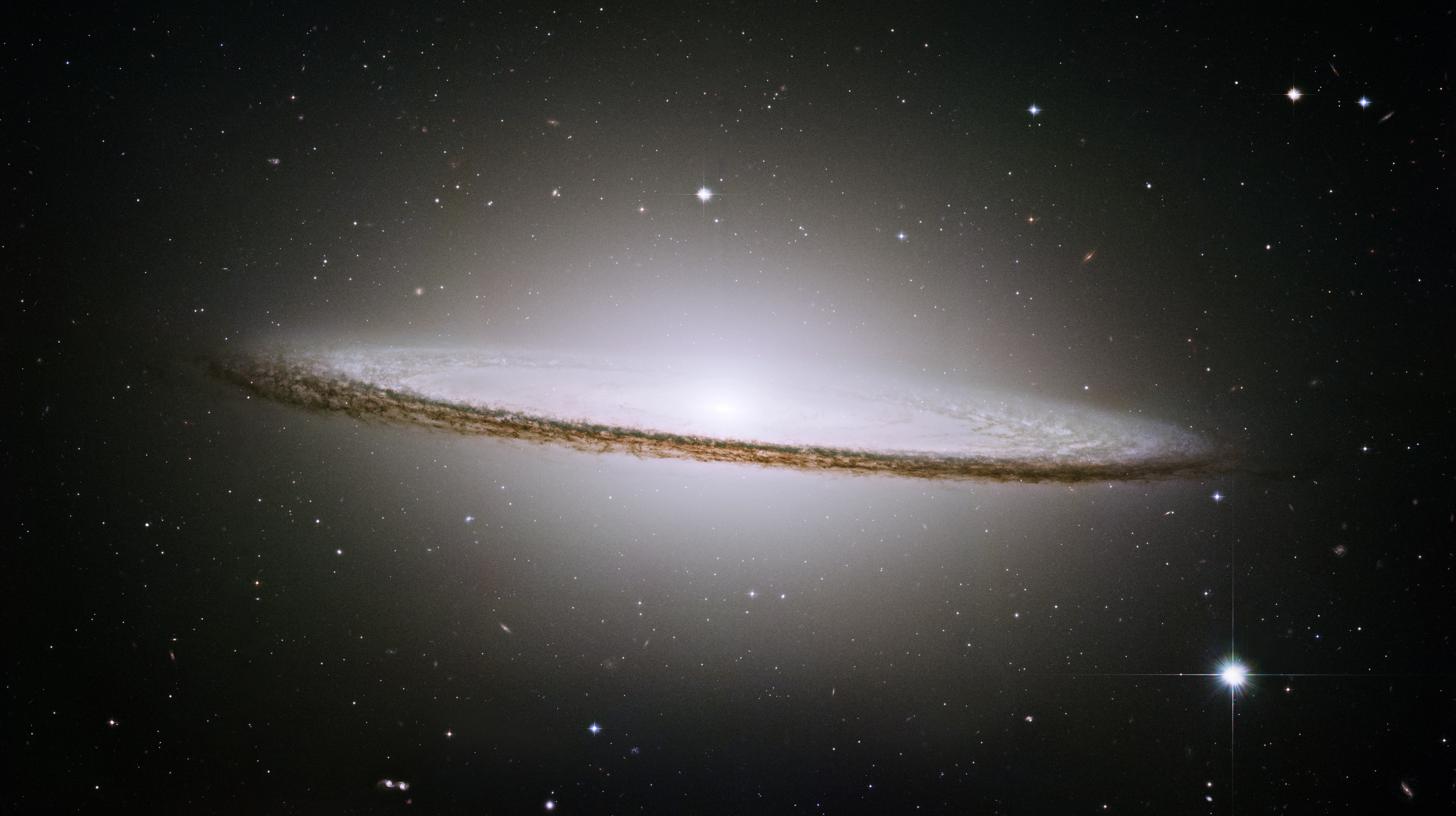
The Sombrero Galaxy (M104) as observed by the Hubble Space Telescope (HST). The Sombrero Galaxy is an example of a LINER galaxy. Credit: HST/NASA/ESA.

A low-ionization nuclear emission-line region (LINER) is a type of galactic nucleus that is defined by its spectral line emission. The spectra typically include line emission from weakly ionized or neutral atoms, such as O, O^{+}, N^{+}, and S^{+}. Conversely, the spectral line emission from strongly ionized atoms, such as O^{++}, Ne^{++}, and He^{+}, is relatively weak. The class of galactic nuclei was first identified by Timothy Heckman in the third of a series of papers on the spectra of galactic nuclei that were published in 1980.

== Demographics of LINER galaxies ==
Galaxies that contain LINERs are often referred to as LINER galaxies. LINER galaxies are very common; approximately one-third of all nearby galaxies (galaxies within approximately 20-40 Mpc) may be classified as LINER galaxies. Approximately 75% of LINER galaxies are either elliptical galaxies, lenticular galaxies, or S0/a-Sab galaxies (spiral galaxies with large bulges and tightly wound spiral arms). LINERs are found less frequently in Sb-Scd galaxies (spiral galaxies with small bulges and loosely wound spiral arms), and they are very rare in nearby irregular galaxies. LINERs also may be commonly found in luminous infrared galaxies (LIRGs), a class of galaxies defined by their infrared luminosities that are frequently formed when two galaxies collide with each other. Approximately one-quarter of LIRGs may contain LINERs.

== Scientific debates: energy sources and ionization mechanisms ==
LINERs have been at the center of two major debates. First, astronomers have debated the source of energy that excites the ionized gas in the centers of these galaxies. Some astronomers have proposed that active galactic nuclei (AGN) with supermassive black holes are responsible for the LINER spectral emission. Other astronomers have asserted that the emission is powered by star formation regions. The other major issue is related to how the ions are excited. Some astronomers have suggested that shock waves propagating through the gas may ionize the gas, while others have suggested that photoionization (ionization by ultraviolet light) may be responsible.

These debates are complicated by the fact that LINERs are found in a wide variety of objects with different brightnesses and morphologies. Moreover, the debate over the energy sources for LINERs is entangled with a similar debate over whether the light from star formation regions or the light from AGN produce the high infrared luminosities seen in LIRGs.

Although both the energy sources and the excitation mechanisms for LINER emission are still being studied, many LINERs are frequently referred to as AGN.

== Star formation in LINERs ==
A number of surveys have been performed to explore the connection between star formation and LINER activity. If a connection can be found between star formation activity and LINER activity, then this strengthens the possibility that LINERs are powered by the hot gas found in star formation regions. However, if star formation cannot be found in LINERs, then this definitively excludes star formation as powering LINER emission.

=== Star formation in LIRGs with LINERs ===
Recent observations with the Spitzer Space Telescope show a clear connection between LINER emission in luminous infrared galaxies (LIRGs) and star formation activity. The mid-infrared spectra of LIRGs with LINERs have been shown to look similar to the mid-infrared spectra of starburst galaxies, which suggest that infrared-bright LINERs are powered by star formation activity. However, some mid-infrared spectral line emission from AGN have also been detected in these galaxies, indicating that star formation may not be the only energy sources in these galaxies.

=== Star formation in normal galaxies with LINERs ===
Normal nearby galaxies with LINERs, however, appear to be different. A few near-infrared spectroscopic surveys have identified some LINERs in normal galaxies that may be powered by star formation. However, most LINERs in nearby galaxies have low levels of star formation activity. Moreover, the stellar populations of many LINERs appear to be very old, and the mid-infrared spectra, as observed by the Spitzer Space Telescope, do not appear similar to the spectra expected from star formation. These results demonstrate that most LINER in nearby normal galaxies may not be powered by star formation, although a few exceptions clearly exist.

== Notable LINER galaxies ==
- Messier 94
- NGC 5005
- NGC 5195
- Sombrero Galaxy

== See also ==
- Seyfert galaxy - Another class of galaxies that contain AGN
