= NGC 5195 =

Dwarf galaxy in the constellation Canes Venatici

- A Hubble Space Telescope (HST) image of Messier 51. M51A (the Whirlpool Galaxy) is the spiral galaxy on the left. NGC 5195 is the galaxy in the top right corner.

Observation data (J2000 epoch)
- Constellation: Canes Venatici
- Right ascension: 13^{h} 29^{m} 59.6^{s}
- Declination: +47° 15′ 58″
- Redshift: 465 ± 10 km/s
- Distance: 25 ± 3 Mly (7.7 ± 1.0 Mpc)
- Apparent magnitude (V): 10.5

Characteristics
- Type: Amorphous or SB0 pec
- Size: 59,500 ly (18.24 kpc) (estimated)
- Apparent size (V): 5′.8 × 4′.6

Other designations
- Messier 51b, HOLM 526B, IRAS 13278+4731, Arp 85, UGC 8494, MCG +08-25-014, PGC 47413, CGCG 246-009, VV 001b

NGC 5195 (also known as Messier 51b or M51b) is a dwarf galaxy that is interacting with the Whirlpool Galaxy (also known as M51a or NGC 5194). Both galaxies are located approximately 25 million light-years away in the constellation Canes Venatici. Together, the two galaxies are one of the most famous interacting galaxy pairs.

== History ==
NGC 5195 was discovered by Pierre Méchain on March 20, 1781.

== Interaction with the Whirlpool Galaxy ==
NGC 5195 and the Whirlpool Galaxy compose one of the most noted interacting galaxy pairs in astronomy. The two galaxies are listed in the Atlas of Peculiar Galaxies as one of several prominent examples of a spiral galaxy with a companion galaxy. The system was also the subject of very early theoretical investigations into galaxy interactions. The two galaxies are connected by a dust-rich tidal bridge. The dust in this tidal bridge can be seen silhouetted against the center of NGC 5195. This demonstrates that NGC 5195 appears to lie behind the Whirlpool Galaxy. The encounter has significantly enhanced the spiral structure of M51.

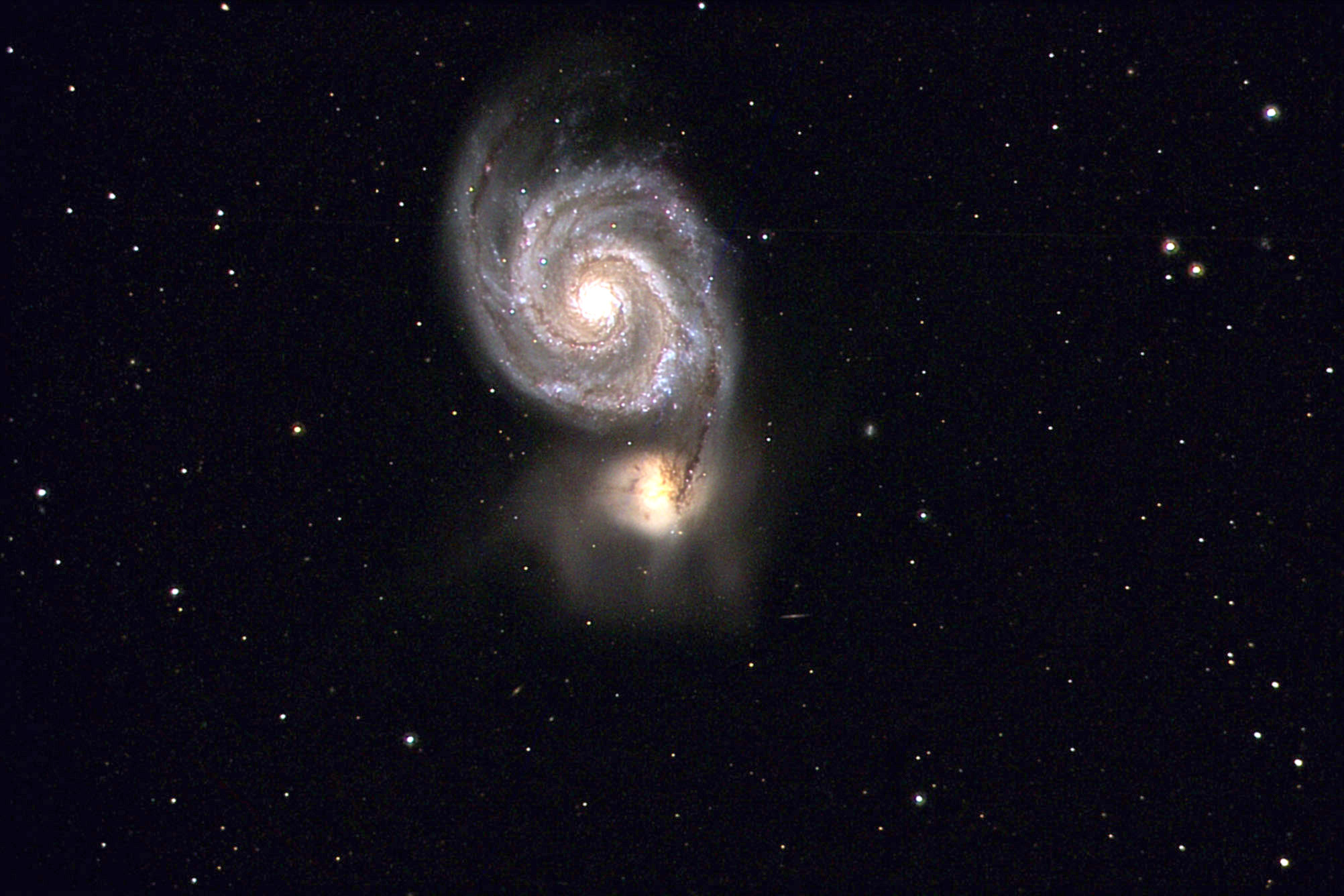
The Whirlpool Galaxy and NGC 5195. Several features can be seen. The three-pronged structure on the lower part of NGC 5195 is referred to as "The Crown", while several stellar streams extend towards the left.

A three-pronged structure extends from NGC 5195. The middle prong seems to be bluer than the other prongs, suggesting that this feature is an extension of the Whirlpool Galaxy’s tidal tails. The structure leads to several massive plumes and streams of stars produced by the interaction with the aforementioned grand-design spiral galaxy. One massive plume is called the "Northwest Plume". However, diffuse high-speed gas within the plume suggests an origin within the Whirlpool Galaxy and not NGC 5195. The Northwest plume partially overlaps and blends it with two stellar streams extending from NGC 5195. Unlike the northwest plume, the stellar streams are bifurcated and similar in color to NGC 5195. A 2015 study observing the Whirlpool galaxy and its companion found two new and very faint tidal structures. One of them is called the "South Plume" while the other one is called the "Northeast Plume".

In January 2016, BBC science reporter Jonathan Webb said, "Astronomers have spotted two huge waves of gas being 'burped' by the black hole at the heart of a nearby galaxy. The swathes of hot gas, detected in X-ray images from NASA's Chandra space telescope, appear to be sweeping cooler hydrogen gas ahead of them. This vast, rippling belch is taking place in NGC 5195 – a small, neglected sibling of the 'Whirlpool Galaxy', 26 million light years away. That makes it one of the closest black holes blasting gas in this way". He added, "The findings, presented at the 227th meeting of the American Astronomical Society (AAS) in Florida, are a dramatic example of 'feedback' between a supermassive black hole and its host galaxy". Webb's report cited Marie Machacek, co-author of the study from the Harvard–Smithsonian Center for Astrophysics (CFA), as saying, "We think that feedback keeps galaxies from becoming too large ... But at the same time, it can be responsible for how some stars form. This shows that black holes can create, not just destroy."

== Morphology ==
As a consequence of the gravitational interaction with the Whirlpool Galaxy, NGC 5195 is highly distorted. Classification of its morphology is difficult, as it is sometimes identified as a lenticular galaxy or as an amorphous or irregular galaxy. It has been described as falling outside the standard morphological classification system.

== Supernova ==
SN 1945A is the only supernova that has been detected within NGC 5195. It was found 10″ northwest of the nucleus on April 6, 1945, by Milton L. Humason using the 100-inch (2.5 m) telescope at Mount Wilson Observatory. The supernova, classified as a Type I supernova, reached a peak apparent magnitude of 14.0.

== See also ==
- NGC 1097
- NGC 1167
- Dwingeloo 1
- List of NGC objects (5001–6000)
