= SN 1994I =

Supernova event from 1994 in constellation Canes Venatici

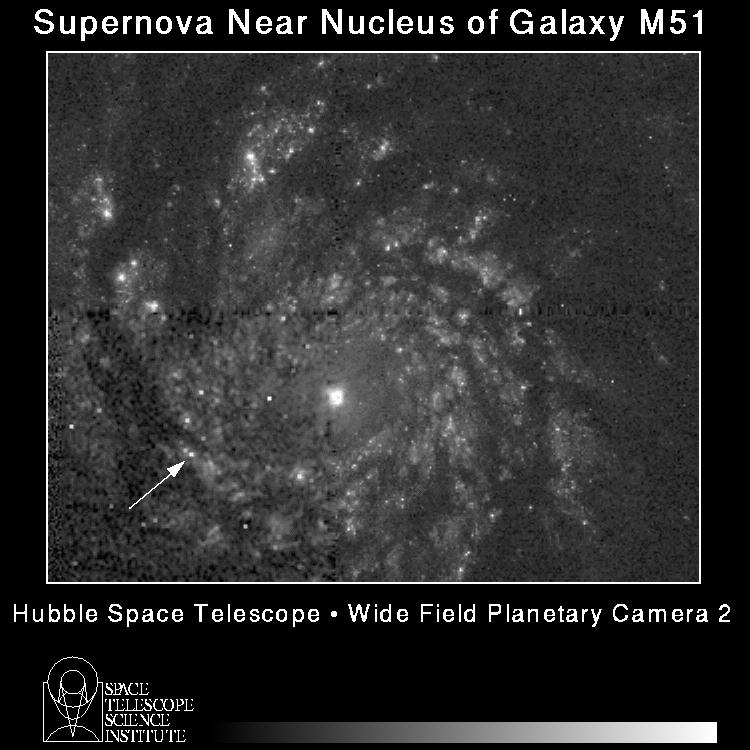
- Event type: Supernova
- Ic
- Date: April 2, 1994
- Constellation: Canes Venatici
- Right ascension: 13^{h} 27^{m} 47.62^{s}
- Declination: 47° 26′ 59.1″
- Epoch: 1950
- Distance: 8.32 Mpc (27.1 Mly)
- Remnant: N/A
- Host: Whirlpool Galaxy
- Colour (B-V): 0.86
- Peak apparent magnitude: 12.91
- Other designations: SN 1994I, AAVSO 1325+47
- Preceded by: SN 1994H
- Related media on Commons

SN 1994I is a Type Ic supernova discovered on April 2, 1994 in the Whirlpool Galaxy by amateur astronomers Tim Puckett and Jerry Armstrong of the Atlanta Astronomy Club. Type Ic supernova are a rare type of supernova that result from the explosion of a very massive star that has shed its outer layers of hydrogen and helium. The explosion results in a highly luminous burst of radiation that then dims over the course of weeks or months. SN 1994I was a relatively nearby supernova, and provided an important addition to the then small collection of known Type Ic supernova. Very early images were captured of SN 1994I, as two high school students in Oil City, Pennsylvania serendipitously took images of the Whirlpool Galaxy using the 30-inch telescope at Leuschner Observatory on March 31, 1994, which included SN 1994I just after it began to brighten.

== Discovery and observations ==
SN 1994I was independently discovered by multiple observers, with the first reports from amateur astronomers Tim Puckett and Jerry Armstrong, followed within the hour by reports by amateurs Wayne Johnson and Doug Millar, Richard Berry, and Reiki Kushida. It was confirmed quickly by Michael Richmond and Alex Filippenko using the Berkeley Automated Imaging Telescope at Leuschner Observatory, who noted that SN 1994I was particularly blue. Initial reports disagreed on the nature of the supernova, with different teams claiming that it was a Type Ia supernova, a Type II supernova, and a Type Ic supernova. Supernova types are observationally distinguished by the presence or absence of spectral lines, with hydrogen being the most important diagnostic. After a week of more data being collected, consensus grew among observers that SN 1994I was a Type Ic.

By chance, observations of SN 1994I were obtained before its discovery was reported. High school students Heather Tartara and Melody Spence requested observations of the Whirlpool Galaxy on March 29 and 31, 1994. Their request was made through the Hands-On Universe program, which allows elementary and high school students to request observations on automated telescopes. Their images captured the Whirlpool Galaxy just before and after SN 1994I began to brighten, and are some of the earliest data recorded for a supernova.

== Characteristics ==
The progenitors of Type Ib, Ic, and II supernovae are commonly called core-collapse supernovae, as they result from massive stars that cannot produce enough pressure to balance the inward force of self-gravity. Yet all Type I supernova are distinguished by their lack of hydrogen absorption lines, and Type Ic also lack helium lines. Initial failure to detect hydrogen or helium led to SN 1994I being classified as a Type Ic. Follow-up observations showed very weak helium absorption features, and thus SN 1994I seems to bridge the two classes, though it is still considered one of the best examples of a Type Ic supernova. There are two proposed mechanisms for removing the hydrogen. One suggests that the progenitors of Type Ib and Ic may be Wolf-Rayet stars, as they produce stellar winds that could blow away the hydrogen. The other possibility is mass transfer to a companion star. The proximity of SN 1994I allowed for detailed comparison of models to the observations. These comparisons showed that SN 1994I was consistent with having lost its outer layers to a companion.
