= NGC 5866B =

Intermediate spiral galaxy in the constellation Draco

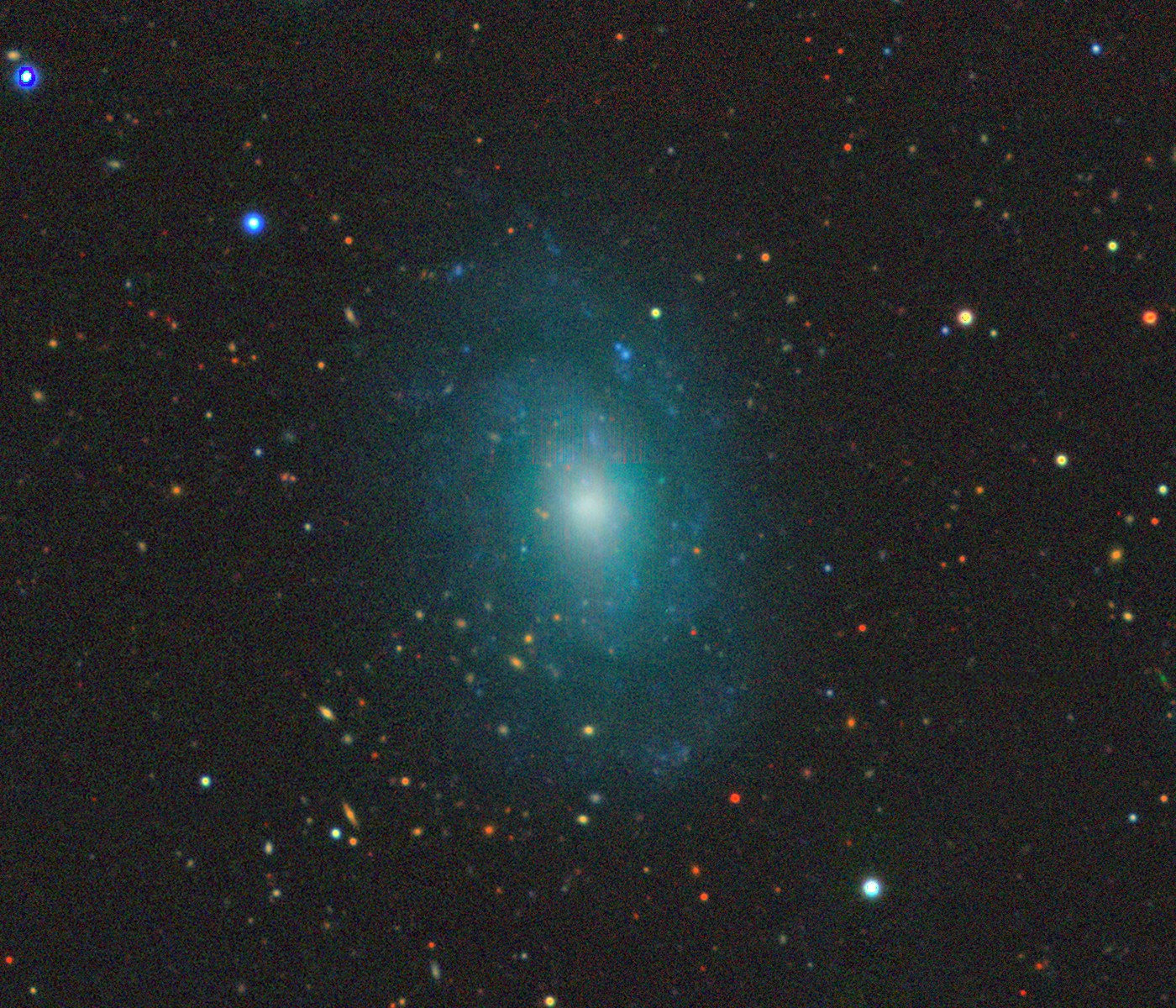
- NGC 5866B imaged by Legacy Surveys

Observation data (J2000 epoch)
- Constellation: Draco
- Right ascension: 15^{h} 12^{m} 7.1448^{s}
- Declination: +55° 47′ 6.187″
- Redshift: 0.002805
- Distance: 52.5 ± 5.2 Mly (16.1 ± 1.6 Mpc)
- Apparent magnitude (V): 15.7

Characteristics
- Type: SAB(rs)dm
- Size: ~45,800 ly (14.05 kpc) (estimated)
- Apparent size (V): 2.29′ × 1.62′

Other designations
- UGC 9769, MCG +09-25-034, PGC 54267, CGCG 274-033

NGC 5866B (also known as UGC 9769) is an intermediate spiral galaxy located about 52 million light-years away from Earth in the constellation of Draco. The galaxy was discovered by Philip C. Keenan in March, 1935. It is sometimes classified as a member of the NGC 5866 Group of galaxies and has a diameter of around 45.8 kly (14.05 kpc). In visible light, the galaxy exhibits an overall bluish color and as it is relatively dim for a galaxy of its size, it is classified as a low surface brightness galaxy (LSB).

NGC 5866B is located relatively close in the sky to the more well-known NGC 5907 (Splinter Galaxy) and NGC 5866 (Spindle Galaxy).

== See also ==
- List of NGC objects (5001–6000)
