= NGC 5876 =

Galaxy in the constellation Boötes

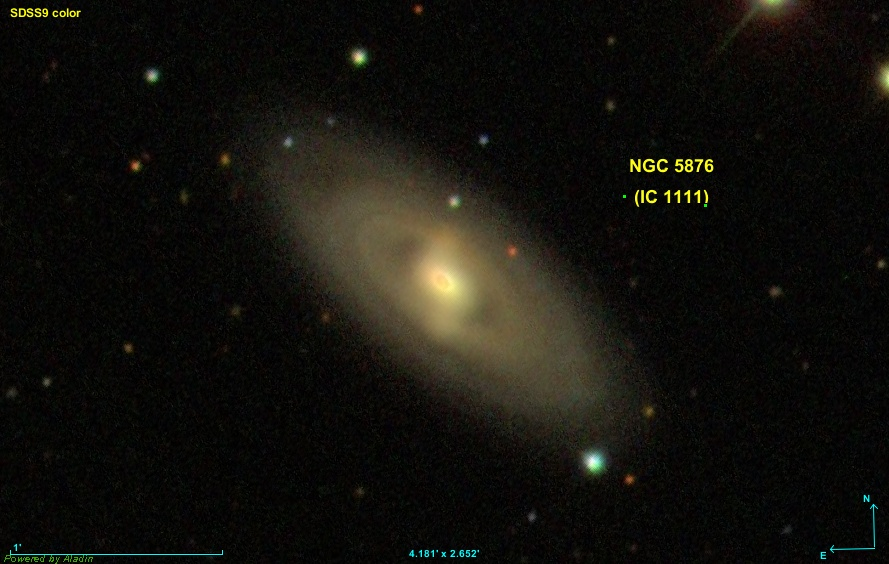
- NGC 5876 imaged by SDSS

Observation data (J2000 epoch)
- Constellation: Boötes
- Right ascension: 15^{h} 09^{m} 31.5811^{s}
- Declination: +54° 30′ 23.521″
- Redshift: 0.010851
- Heliocentric radial velocity: 3253 ± 2 km/s
- Distance: 160.0 ± 11.2 Mly (49.05 ± 3.43 Mpc)
- Group or cluster: NGC 5908 Group (LGG 395)
- Apparent magnitude (V): 12.7

Characteristics
- Type: SB(r)ab?
- Size: ~174,300 ly (53.43 kpc) (estimated)
- Apparent size (V): 2.4′ × 1.2′

Other designations
- IRAS F15081+5441, 2MASX J15093156+5430228, IC 1111, UGC 9747, MCG +09-25-028, PGC 54110, CGCG 274-028

NGC 5876 is a barred spiral galaxy in the constellation of Boötes. Its velocity with respect to the cosmic microwave background is 3325 ± 5 km/s, which corresponds to a Hubble distance of 49.05 ± 3.43 Mpc (~160 million light-years). However, three non redshift measurements give a much greater distance of 65.6 ± 0.346 Mpc (~214 million light-years). The galaxy was discovered by American astronomer Lewis Swift on 11 June 1885. Swift observed the galaxy again on August 27, 1888, and not realizing that he had already observed it, entered the galaxy into the Index Catalogue as IC 1111.

According to the SIMBAD database, NGC 5876 is a LINER galaxy, i.e. a galaxy whose nucleus has an emission spectrum characterized by broad lines of weakly ionized atoms.

== NGC 5908 Group ==
NGC 5876 is part of the NGC 5908 group (also known as LGG 395), which includes at least six other members: NGC 5820, NGC 5821, NGC 5874, NGC 5905, NGC 5908, and UGC 9759.

== Supernova ==
One supernova has been observed in NGC 5876: SN 2024igg (Type Ia-SC, mag. 17.7639) was discovered by the Automatic Learning for the Rapid Classification of Events (ALeRCE) on 7 May 2024.

== See also ==
- List of NGC objects (5001–6000)
