= Messier 102 =

Galaxy with a disputed and ambiguous identity

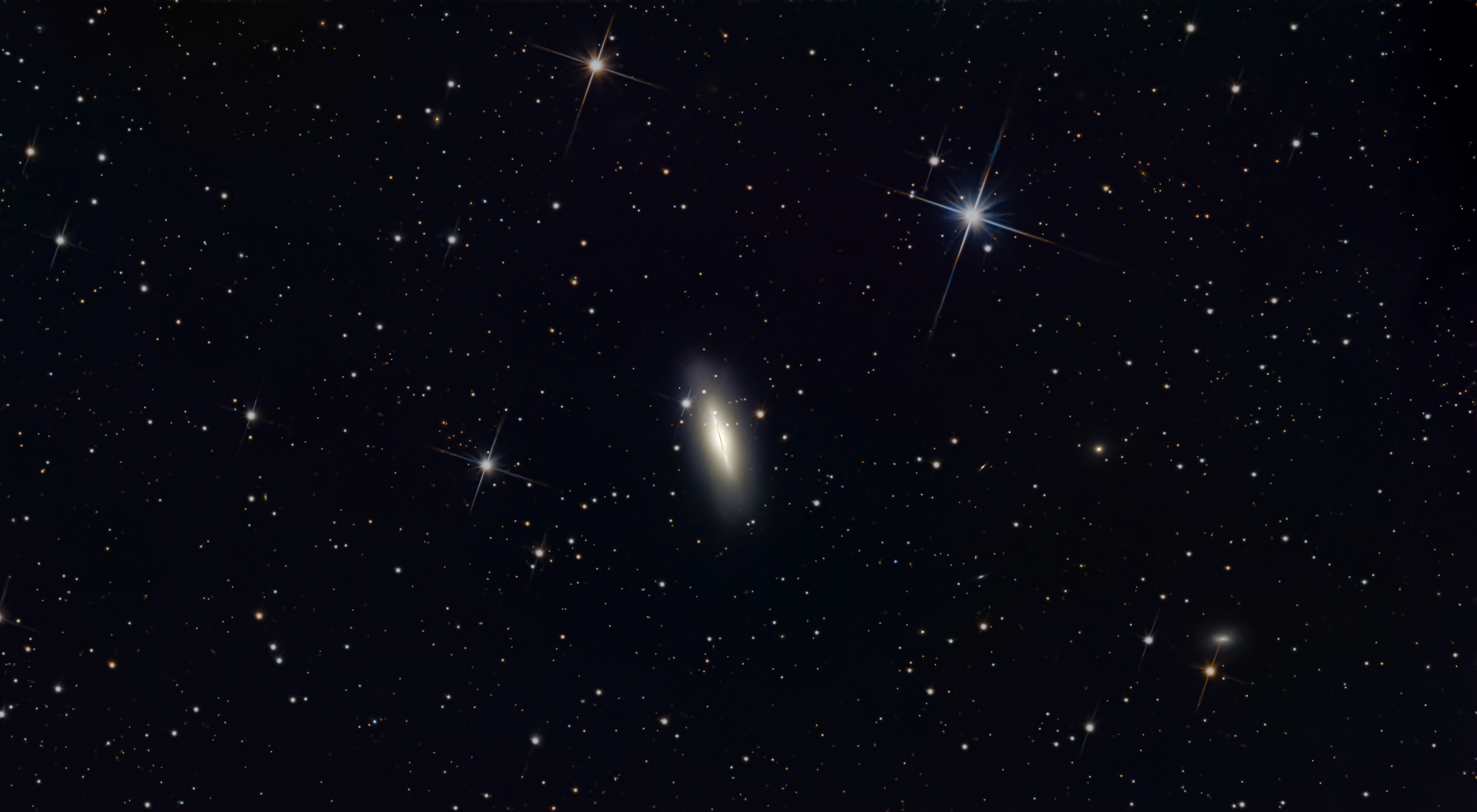
Messier 102 (Bluegrass Astro)

Messier 102 (also known as M102) is a galaxy listed in the Messier Catalogue that cannot be unambiguously identified. Its original discoverer Pierre Méchain retracted his discovery two years after publication and said that it was a duplicate observation of Messier 101. Later historical evidence favors that M102 is actually the galaxy NGC 5866, although other galaxies have been suggested as possible identities. The National Aeronautics and Space Administration (NASA) considers it to be the same as NGC 5866.

== History ==
The Messier Catalogue was a list of astronomical objects compiled by Charles Messier between 1771 and 1781, in which he briefly described each object and provided their coordinates on the sky. Because Messier was only interested in finding comets, he created this list of non-comet objects that frustrated his hunt for them. Astronomer Pierre Méchain collaborated with Messier on the compilation of his list.

M102 was observed by Méchain in late March or early April 1781 and was added by Messier to the final version of his catalogue published in 1781. However, Messier did not include the coordinates of M102 on his catalogue, leading to confusion about the exact object they observed. His description of the object was the following:

Nébuleuse entre les étoiles Omicron du Bouvier & Iota du Dragon: elle est très-foible; près d'elle est une étoile de la sixième grandeur.

Nebula between the stars Omicron Boötis and Iota Draconis: it is very faint; near it is a star of 6th magnitude.

— Charles Messier (1781), Connaissance des Temps pour l'Année 1784

In 1783, Méchain retracted his discovery in a letter written to J. Bernoulli and claimed that M102 was actually an accidental duplication of M101 in the catalog. This letter was later published twice: First in original French in the Memoirs of the Berlin Academy for 1782, and second in German translation and somewhat rearranged by Johann Elert Bode in the Berliner Astronomisches Jahrbuch for 1786.

J'ajouterai seulement que N.101 et 102 a la p. 267 Connaissance des tems 1784 ne sont qu'une même nébuleuse, qui a été prise pour deux, par une faute des cartes.

I will add only that No. 101 & 102 on the p. 267 of the Connoissance des tems [for] 1784 are nothing but the same nebula, which has been taken for two, by an error in the [sky] charts.

— Pierre Méchain (1783), Memoirs of the Berlin Academy for 1782

== Candidate corresponding objects ==
Since the publication of the Messier Catalogue, a number of galaxies have been identified by different historians, professional astronomers, and amateur astronomers as corresponding to M102.

=== Messier 101 ===
Messier 101 as observed by the Hubble Space Telescope. Credit: NASA/ESA.

Messier 101 (also known as the Pinwheel Galaxy or NGC 5457) is a face-on spiral galaxy in the constellation Ursa Major. In a letter written in 1783 to J. Bernoulli, Pierre Méchain (who had shared information about his discoveries with Messier) claimed that M102 was actually an accidental duplication of M101 in the catalog. This letter was later published twice: First in original French in the Memoirs of the Berlin Academy for 1782, and second in German translation and somewhat rearranged by Johann Elert Bode in the Berliner Astronomisches Jahrbuch for 1786.

=== NGC 5866 ===
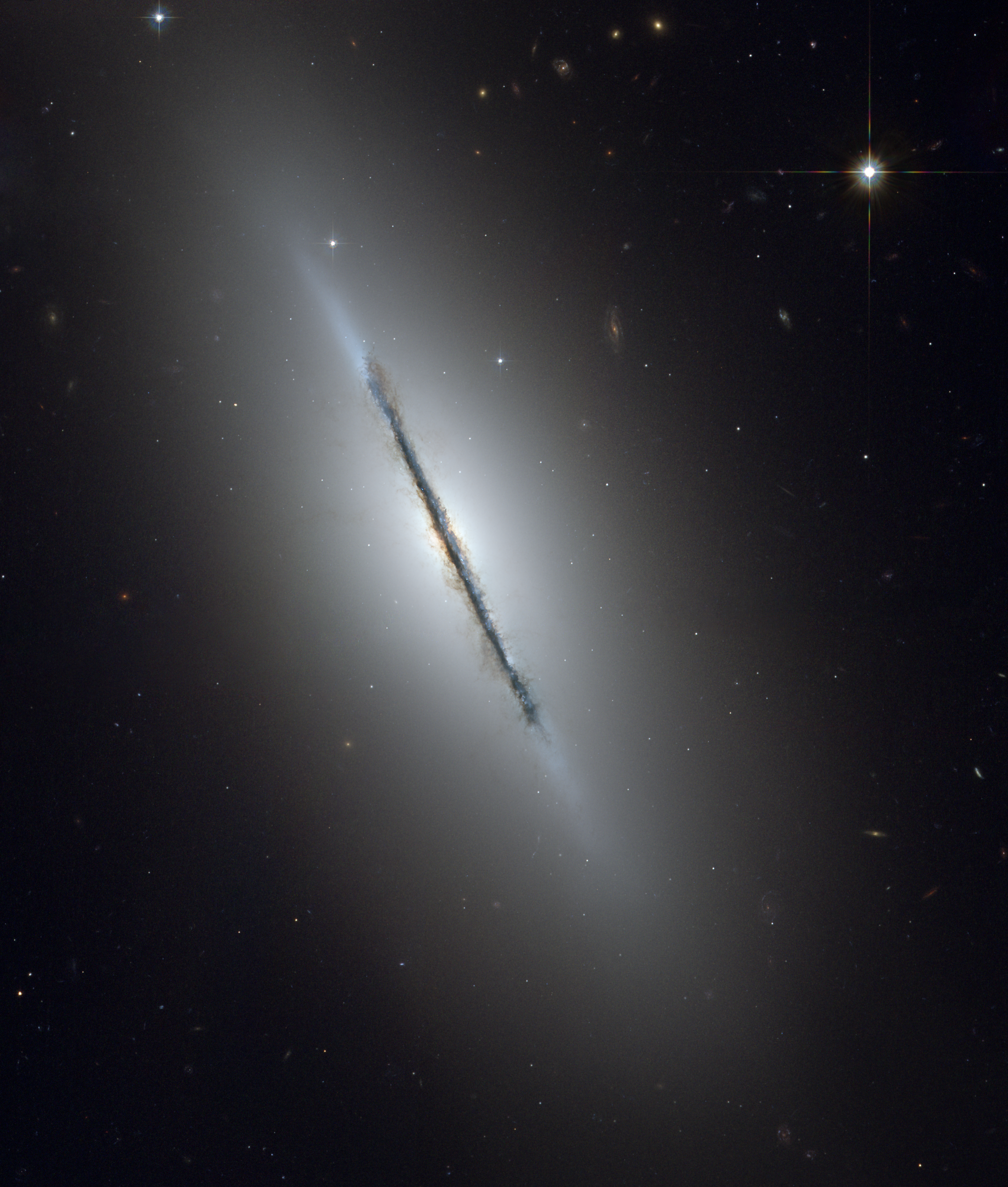
NGC 5866 as observed by the Hubble Space Telescope. Credit: NASA/ESA.

NGC 5866 (one of two galaxies commonly called the Spindle Galaxy) is a lenticular galaxy in the constellation Draco. This galaxy appears to closely match both the object description (by Pierre Méchain) in the printed version of the Messier Catalog of 1781, and the object position given by Charles Messier in hand-written notes on his personal list of the Messier Catalogue.

=== Other possible corresponding objects ===
Although M101 and NGC 5866 are considered to be the two most likely candidates for M102, a few other objects have been suggested as potentially corresponding to this entry.

==== NGC 5879, NGC 5907, NGC 5908 ====
NGC 5879, NGC 5907, NGC 5905, and NGC 5908 are all galaxies near the position of NGC 5866. By that criterion, they may all be as likely as NGC 5866 to be the objects that correspond to M102. However, none of these galaxies are as bright or as high in surface brightness as NGC 5866, so it is less likely that these objects correspond to M102.

==== NGC 5928 ====
NGC 5928 is a 14th magnitude galaxy located between ο Boötis and ι Serpentis. J. L. E. Dreyer, in his Notes and Corrections to the New General Catalogue, suggested that this may have been the source identified as M102 on the basis that ι Serpentis may have been misidentified as ι Draconis in the location given for the object. However, it may not have been observable by Messier and Méchain, since even the faintest objects in Messier's catalogue are of roughly 10th magnitude, so it is unlikely to correspond to M102.
