= NGC 4570 =

Galaxy in the constellation Virgo

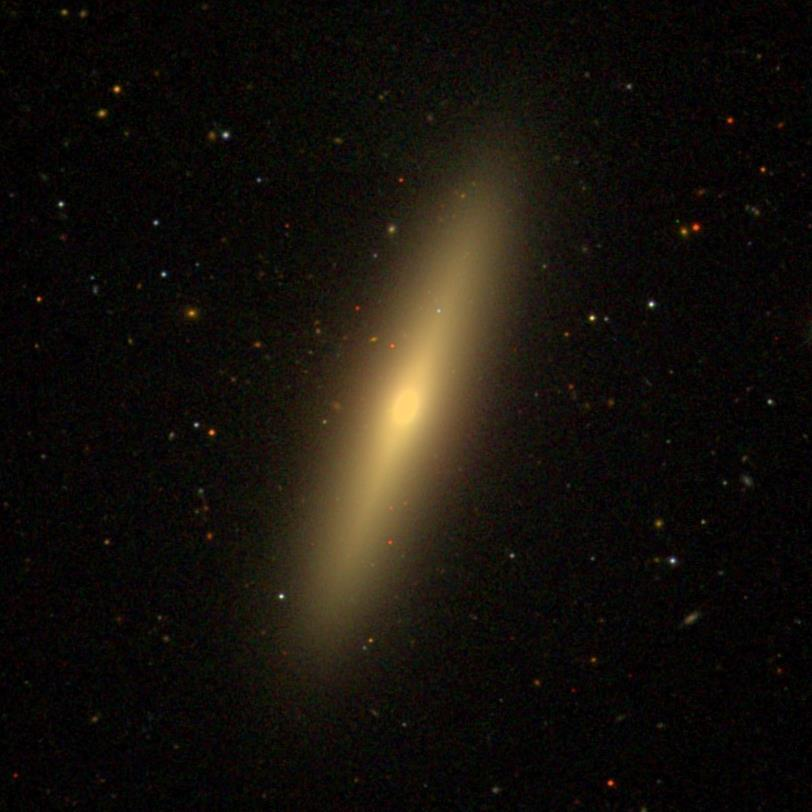
- SDSS image of NGC 4570.

Observation data (J2000 epoch)
- Constellation: Virgo
- Right ascension: 12^{h} 36^{m} 53.4^{s}
- Declination: 07° 14′ 48″
- Redshift: 0.005961
- Heliocentric radial velocity: 1787 km/s
- Distance: 57.30 Mly (17.569 Mpc)
- Group or cluster: Virgo Cluster
- Apparent magnitude (V): 10.8

Characteristics
- Type: S0
- Size: ~70,000 ly (21.46 kpc) (estimated)
- Apparent size (V): 3.7′ × 1.2′

Other designations
- NGC 4570, UGC 7785, MCG 1-32-114, PGC 42096, CGCG 42-178

NGC 4570 is an edge-on lenticular galaxy located about 57 million light-years away in the constellation of Virgo. NGC 4570 was discovered by astronomer William Herschel on April 13, 1784 and is a member of the Virgo Cluster.

== Structure ==
NGC 4570 has a nuclear disc that extends to a radius of about ~330 ly (100 pc). In between the nuclear disk and the surrounding two stellar rings and the outer disk, there is a gap that separates the outer edge of the nuclear disk and the inner edge of the main disk by about ~330 ly (100 pc). This multi-disc structure may have been shaped through secular evolution induced by a small nuclear bar.

About 120 globular clusters have been detected surrounding NGC 4570. Observations of the globular clusters surrounding NGC 4570 have found a significant population with ages ranging from about 1–3 billion years. Surprisingly, the estimated ages of the young globular clusters appears to be in good agreement with the estimated age of the stellar population of the nuclear disc (≤2 Gyr). This suggests that the young globular clusters and the nuclear disc instead formed from a merger or accretion event which involved significant amounts of gas and triggered a strong starburst in the galaxy.

== See also ==
- List of NGC objects (4001–5000)
- NGC 5866
