= NGC 5965 =

Spiral galaxy in the constellation Draco

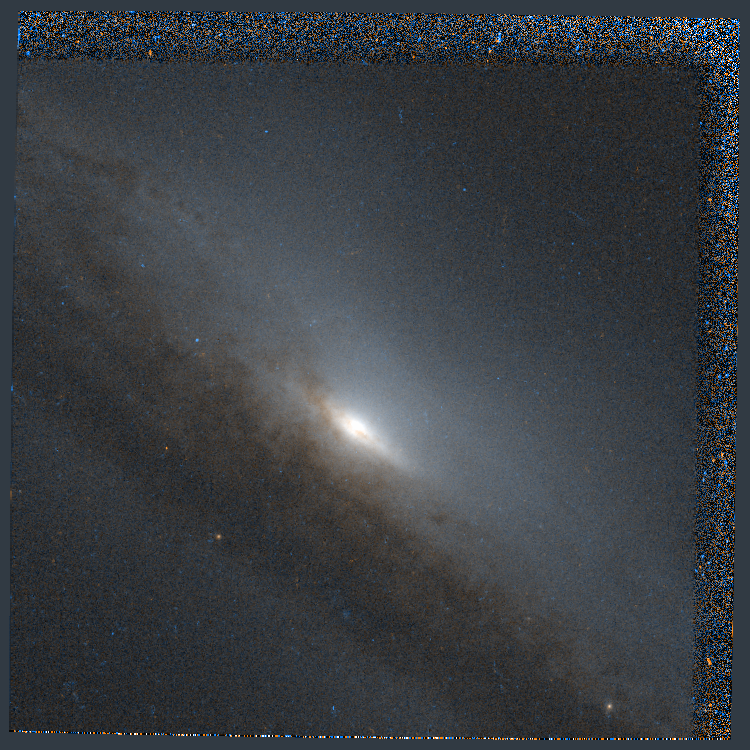
- NGC 5965 by Hubble Space Telescope

Observation data (J2000 epoch)
- Constellation: Draco
- Right ascension: 15^{h} 34^{m} 02.5^{s}
- Declination: +56° 41′ 08″
- Redshift: 0.011381 ± 0.000017
- Heliocentric radial velocity: 3,412 ± 5 km/s
- Distance: 149 ± 22 Mly (45.7 ± 6.7 Mpc)
- Apparent magnitude (V): 11.9

Characteristics
- Type: Sb
- Apparent size (V): 6.16′ × 0.84′

Other designations
- UGC 9914, CGCG 297-016, MCG +10-22-020, PGC 55459

NGC 5965 is a spiral galaxy located in the constellation Draco. It is located at a distance of circa 150 million light years from Earth, which, given its apparent dimensions, means that NGC 5965 is about 260,000 light years across. It was discovered by William Herschel on May 5, 1788.

NGC 5965 is seen nearly edge-on, with an inclination of 80 degrees. Dust is seen across the galactic disk, while there is also a red dust lane at the nucleus. The bulge is X-shaped, that suggests that the galaxy is actually barred. NGC 5965 along with another edge-on galaxy, NGC 5746, were the galaxies used to confirm that peanut shaped bulges are associated with the presence of a bar, by spectrographically observing the disturbance caused at the velocity distributions of the galaxies. The galaxy features some level of disk disturbance, like a warp, as the outer part of the disk along with a ring-like dust lane appear to be on a different plane from the bulge, but it could also be a projection effect. When observed in the K band, the galaxy features a stellar ring.

NGC 5965 lies in a galaxy filament which also includes NGC 5987 and its loose group, which includes NGC 5981, NGC 5982, NGC 5985, three galaxies known as the Sampler.

== Supernovae ==
Two supernovae have been observed in NGC 5965:

- SN 2001 cm (Type II, mag. 17.5) was discovered by the Beijing Astronomical Observatory (BAO) on 3 June 2001.
- SN 2018cyg (Type II, mag. 18.7) was discovered by the Lick Observatory Supernova Search (LOSS) on 30 June 2018.

== Gallery ==
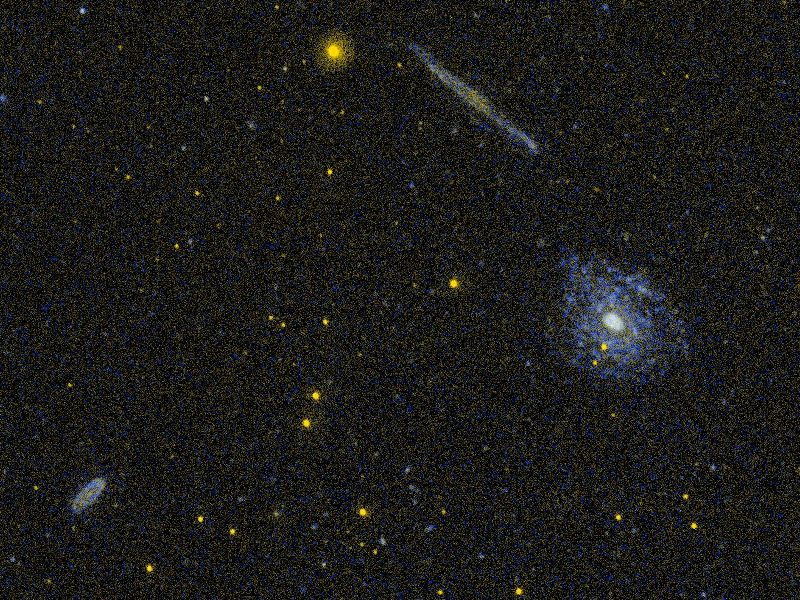
NGC 5963, NGC 5965, and NGC 5971 by GALEX

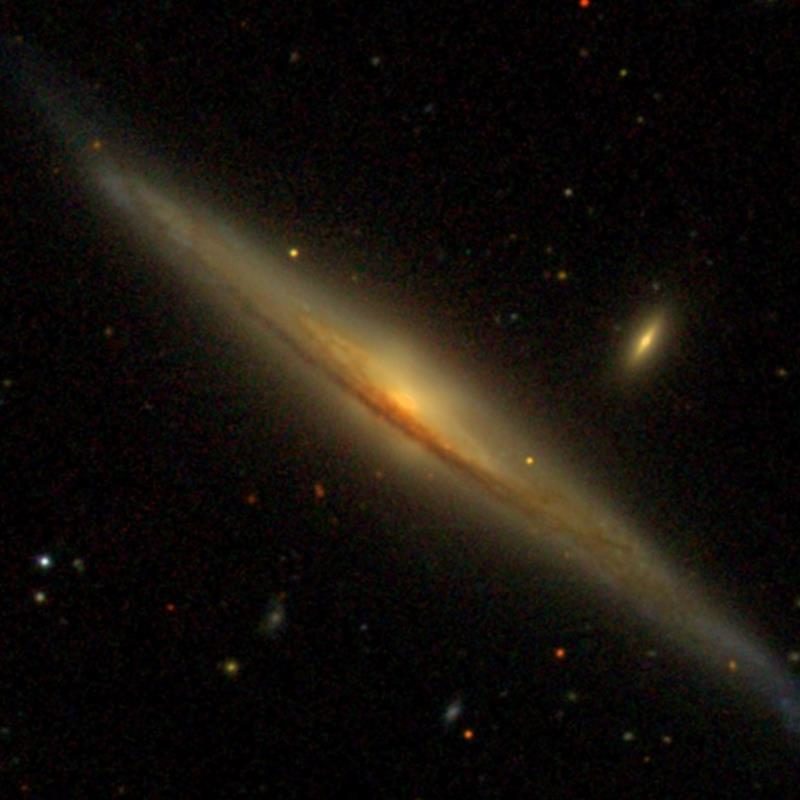
NGC 5965 by the Sloan Digital Sky Survey
