= M102 =

M102 may refer to:

- Messier 102, an object listed in the Messier Catalogue that remains unidentified
- M102 howitzer, an American light-towed 105 mm howitzer
- Mercedes-Benz M102 engine, an automobile engine developed by Mercedes-Benz
- BMW M102, a BMW piston engine
- M-102 (Michigan highway), a highway in Michigan along 8 Mile Road
- M102 (New York City bus), a bus route in Manhattan
