= NGC 5905 =

Galaxy in the constellation Draco

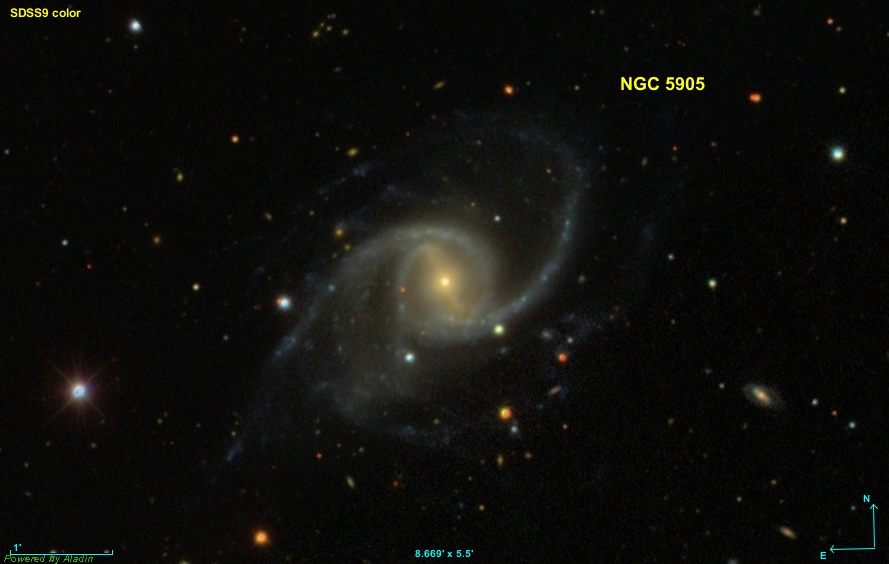
- NGC 5905 imaged by SDSS

Observation data (J2000 epoch)
- Constellation: Draco
- Right ascension: 15^{h} 15^{m} 23.3243^{s}
- Declination: +55° 31′ 01.995″
- Redshift: 0.011308±0.0000170
- Heliocentric radial velocity: 3,390±5 km/s
- Distance: 119.16 ± 8.34 Mly (36.536 ± 2.556 Mpc)
- Group or cluster: NGC 5908 group (LGG 395)
- Apparent magnitude (V): 12.49

Characteristics
- Type: SB(r)b
- Size: ~162,900 ly (49.95 kpc) (estimated)
- Apparent size (V): 4.0′ × 2.6′

Other designations
- IRAS 15140+5541, 2MASX J15152332+5531015, UGC 9797, MCG +09-25-038, PGC 54445, CGCG 274-036

NGC 5905 is a barred spiral galaxy in the constellation of Draco. Its velocity with respect to the cosmic microwave background is 3,454±7 km/s, which corresponds to a Hubble distance of 166.2 ± 11.6 Mly (50.95 ± 3.57 Mpc). However, 14 non-redshift measurements give a much closer mean distance of 119.16 ± 8.34 Mly (36.536 ± 2.556 Mpc). It was discovered by German-British astronomer William Herschel on 5 May 1788.

NGC 5905 has an active galactic nucleus, i.e. it has a compact region at the center of a galaxy that emits a significant amount of energy across the electromagnetic spectrum, with characteristics indicating that this luminosity is not produced by the stars.

NGC 5905 is also a Seyfert I galaxy, i.e. it has a quasar-like nucleus with very high surface brightnesses whose spectra reveal strong, high-ionisation emission lines, but unlike quasars, the host galaxy is clearly detectable.

== NGC 5908 group ==
According to A.M. Garcia, NGC 5905 is part of the NGC 5908 group (also known as LGG 395) which has at least seven members, including NGC 5820, NGC 5821, NGC 5874, NGC 5876, NGC 5908, and UGC 9759.

== Supernova ==
One supernova has been observed in NGC 5905:

- SN 1963O (type unknown, mag. 16) was discovered by Swiss astronomer Paul Wild on 17 August 1963.

== See also ==
- List of NGC objects (5001–6000)
