= NGC 5907 =

Galaxy in the constellation Draco

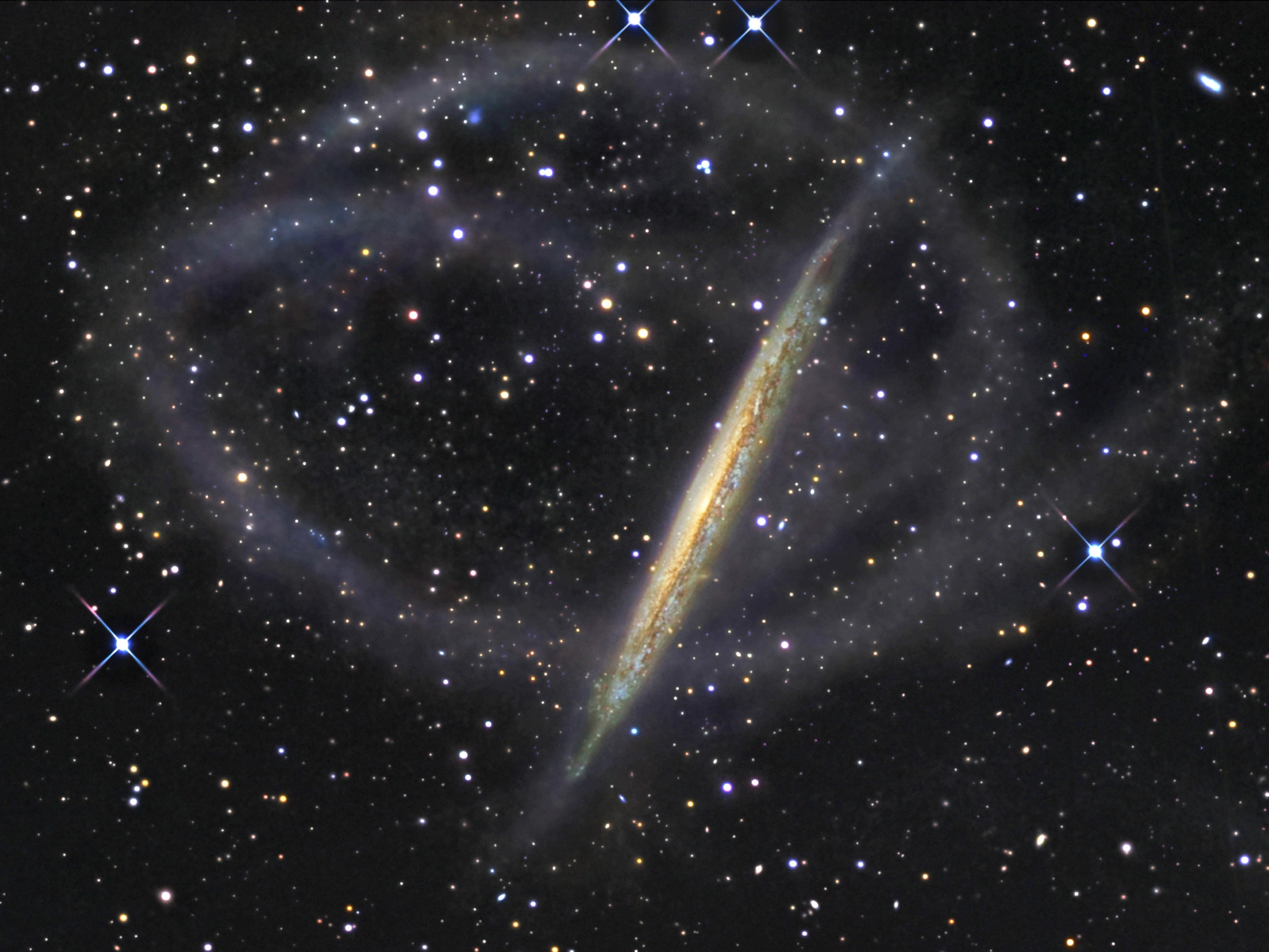
- NGC 5907 and stellar stream

Observation data (J2000 epoch)
- Constellation: Draco
- Right ascension: 15^{h} 15^{m} 53.2397^{s}
- Declination: +56° 19′ 47.568″
- Redshift: 0.002218
- Heliocentric radial velocity: 665 ± 1 km/s
- Distance: 46.56 ± 1.77 Mly (14.275 ± 0.543 Mpc)
- Group or cluster: NGC 5907 group (LGG 396)
- Apparent magnitude (V): 11.1
- Surface brightness: 23.6 mag/arcsec^{2}

Characteristics
- Type: SA(s)c? edge-on
- Size: ~173,400 ly (53.15 kpc) (estimated)
- Apparent size (V): 12.7′ × 1.4′

Other designations
- Splinter Galaxy, HOLM 704A, IRAS 15146+5629, NGC 5906, UGC 9801, MCG +09-25-040, PGC 54470, CGCG 274-038

NGC 5907 (also known as NGC 5906, Knife-Edge Galaxy, Splinter Galaxy, or Cat Scratch Galaxy) is a spiral galaxy located approximately 46.5 million light years from Earth. German-British astronomer William Herschel discovered the galaxy on 5 May 1788. Its most notable features are its large stellar stream and ultraluminous X-ray source.

== Characteristics ==
NGC 5907 has an anomalously low metallicity and few detectable giant stars, being apparently composed almost entirely of dwarf stars. It is a member of the NGC 5866 Group.

NGC 5907 has long been considered a prototypical example of a warped spiral in relative isolation. In 1998, a faint ring structure, likely caused by a disrupted dwarf spheroidal galaxy, was first observed around the galaxy. This challenged the assumption of isolation and suggests the gravitational perturbations induced by the stream progenitor may be the cause for the warp. Then, in 2008, an international team of astronomers announced the presence of an extended double loop tidal stream coiling around the galaxy. The existence of part of these tidal streams has been recently challenged by some deeper surveys, which show only a single knee-shaped stream as opposed to the full double loop structure. This shorter stream has a length of 45′ in the sky (or a physical size of 220 kpc) and has a surface brightness ranging from 27.6 mag/arcsec^{2} at its brightest to 28.8 at its faintest.

An ultraluminous X-ray source, NGC 5907 ULX-1, is located in the galaxy. This source is also called an ultraluminous X-ray pulsar (ULXP) because it exhibits a rapid pulsation effect. This pulsation has a period of 5.7 days and is caused by a rotating neutron star orbiting a high mass companion. The neutron star itself has a spin period of 1.13 seconds and seems to be accelerating; its period ten years prior was 1.43 seconds. It is one of the brightest such source yet discovered with a luminosity over 10^{41} erg/s (7 orders of magnitude more luminous than the Sun). Notably, its peak luminosity is over 1000 times greater than the Eddington luminosity for a neutron star.

NGC 5907 and the galaxy KUG 1513+566 are listed together as Holm 704 in Erik Holmberg's A Study of Double and Multiple Galaxies Together with Inquiries into some General Metagalactic Problems, published in 1937.

== NGC 5907 group ==
NGC 5907 is part of a group of galaxies that bears its name. The NGC 5907 group (also known as LGG 396) has at least four members, including Messier 102, NGC 5879, and UGC 9776.

== Supernovae ==
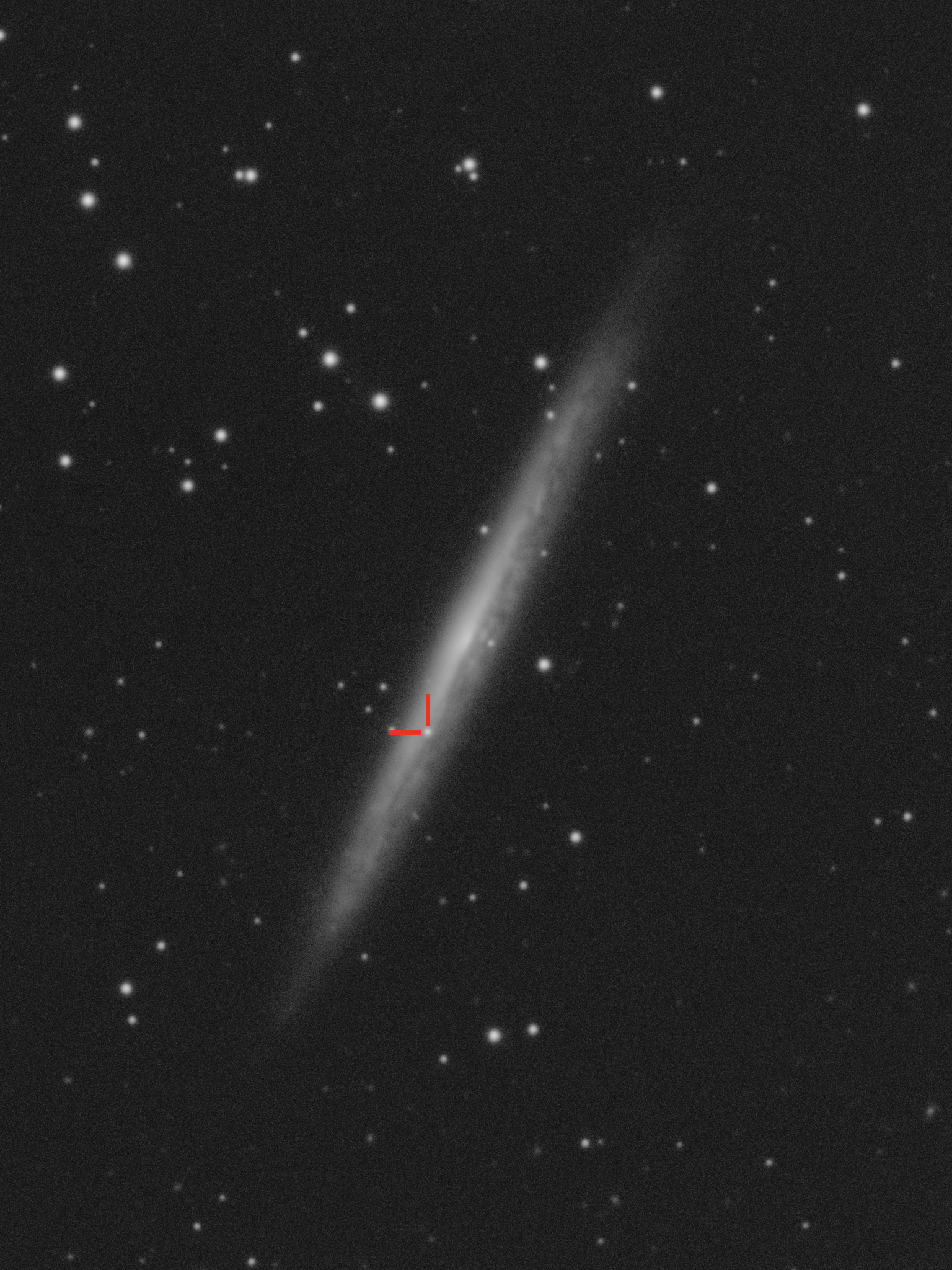
Near infrared image of SN2026kid (marked by red crosshairs)

Two supernovae have been observed in NGC 5907:

- SN 1940A (Type II-L, mag 14.3) was discovered by Josef J. Johnson on 16 February 1940.
- SN 2026kid (Type II, mag. 16.62) was discovered by Yasuo Sano on 22 April 2026.

== Location ==
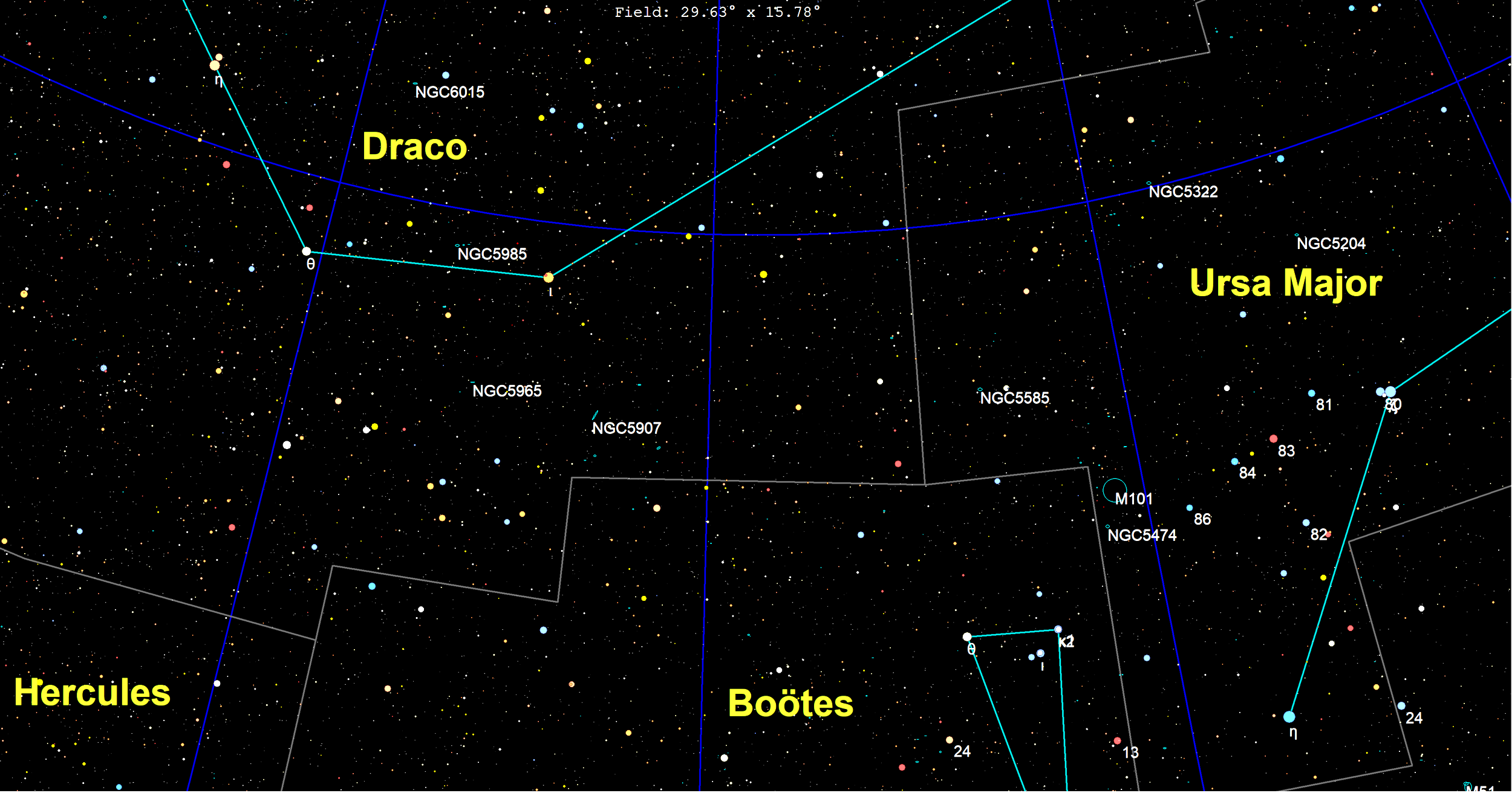

The edge-on galaxy is seen in the constellation Draco, near the star iota Draconis. It is seen in the sky near to the much more distant galaxy NGC 5965.

== NGC Identification ==
NGC 5907 is also known as NGC 5906. This second NGC number refers to a fainter part of the galaxy lying west of the dust lane that was recorded by astronomer and physicist George Johnstone Stoney on April 13, 1850.

== Gallery ==
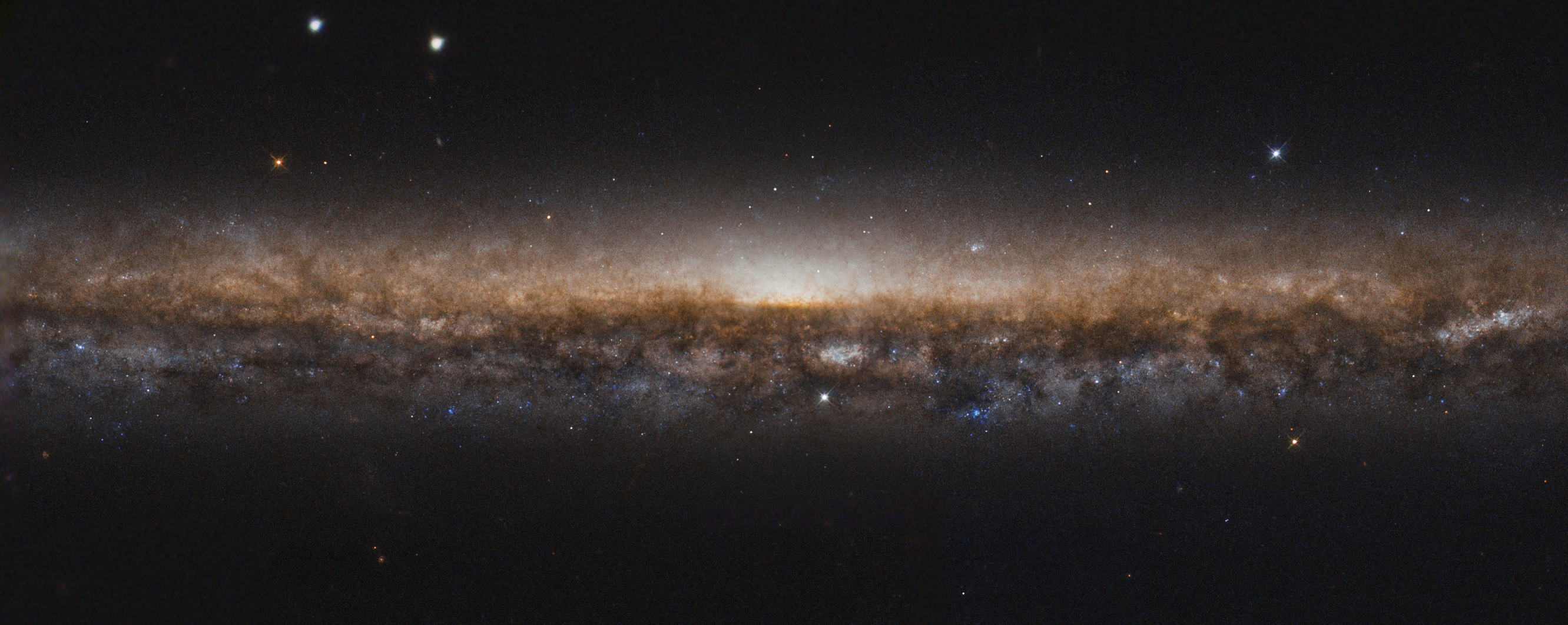
Spiral galaxy NGC 5907, by HST.
