= NGC 5963 =

Spiral galaxy in the constellation Draco

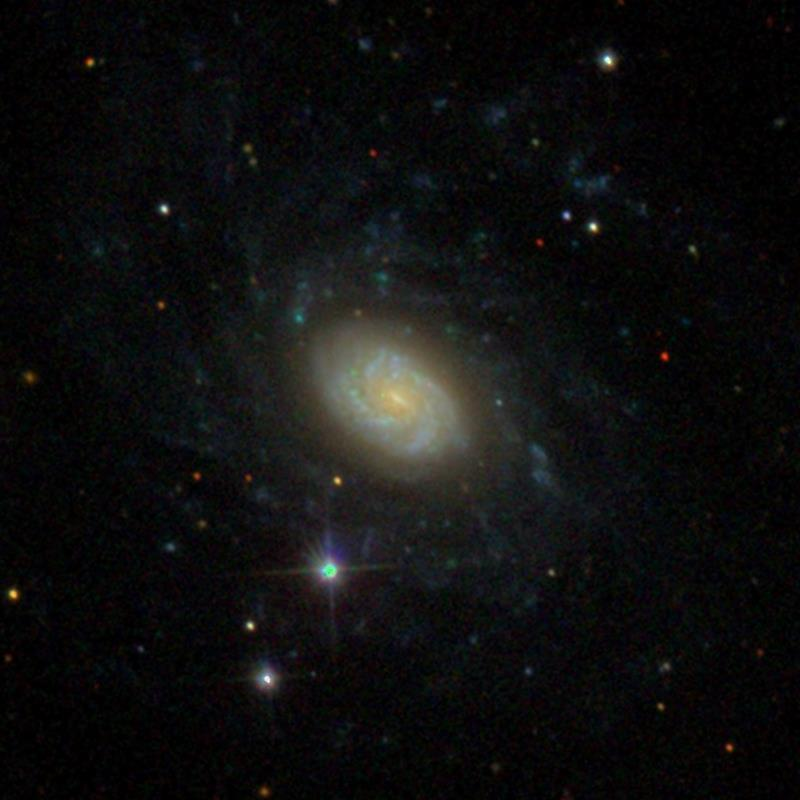
- NGC 5963 (Sloan Digital Sky Survey)

Observation data (J2000 epoch)
- Constellation: Draco
- Right ascension: 15^{h} 33^{m} 27.73^{s}
- Declination: +56° 33′ 33.9″
- Redshift: 0.00215±0.00009
- Heliocentric radial velocity: 654 km/s
- Distance: 42.4 ± 9.8 Mly (13.0 ± 3.0 Mpc)
- Apparent magnitude (V): 13.1

Characteristics
- Type: S/Sc or S pec
- Size: 15 kpc
- Apparent size (V): 4.0′ × 3.0′

Other designations
- NGC 5963, UGC 9906, PGC 55419

NGC 5963 is a spiral galaxy in the northern constellation of Draco. It was discovered on May 5, 1788 by German-British astronomer William Herschel. NGC 5963 has an apparent visual magnitude of 13.1 and is located at a distance of 42 million light-years (13.0 Mpc) from the Milky Way galaxy. It has an angular separation of just 9′ from NGC 5965, but the two galaxies are not physically related. Although it is relatively isolated, NGC 5963 is sometimes classified as a member of the NGC 5866 Group of galaxies.

The morphological classification of NGC 5963 is Sc, indicating a spiral galaxy with somewhat loosely wound spiral arms. It is characterized by an unusually low surface brightness and has just a hint of a bulge component. There is a high surface brightness nuclear region with an oval shape spanning ~40″, which forms a spiral sub-system. Surrounding this is a patchy, loosely wound spiral forming a faint disk. The rotation curve of NGC 5963 matches that of similar galaxies with normal surface brightness, suggesting this galaxy has a more concentrated halo.
