= NGC 5866 Group =

Group of galaxies in the constellation Draco

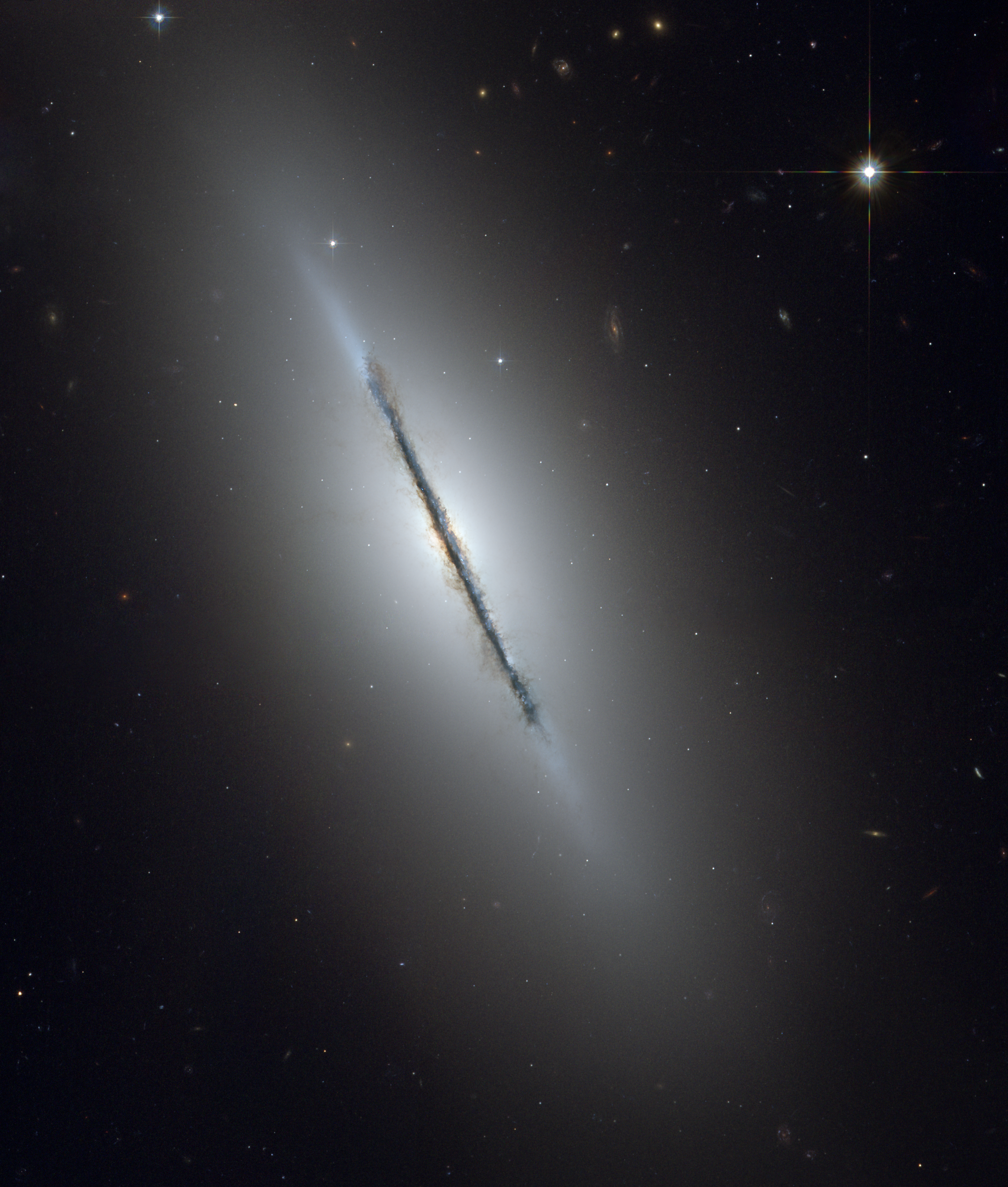
- NGC 5866, one of the brightest galaxies in the NGC 5866 Group.

Observation data (Epoch J2000)
- Constellation: Draco
- Right ascension: 15^{h} 12^{m}
- Declination: +56° 26′
- Brightest member: NGC 5907
- Number of galaxies: 3–7

Other designations
- NGC 5907 Group, LGG 396, NOGG H 836, NOGG P1 841, NOGG P2 856

The NGC 5866 Group is a small group of galaxies located in the constellation Draco. The group is named after NGC 5866, the galaxy with the highest apparent magnitude in the group, although some galaxy group catalogs list NGC 5907 as the brightest member.

== Members ==
The table below lists galaxies that have been consistently identified as group members in the Nearby Galaxies Catalog, the Lyons Groups of Galaxies (LGG) Catalog, and the three group lists created from the Nearby Optical Galaxy sample of Giuricin et al.

Members of the NGC 5866 Group
Name	Type	R.A. (J2000)	Dec. (J2000)	Redshift (km/s)	Apparent Magnitude
NGC 5866	S0	15^{h} 06^{m} 29.5^{s}	+55° 45′ 48″	672 ± 9	10.7
NGC 5879	SA(rs)bc	15^{h} 09^{m} 46.8^{s}	+57° 00′ 01″	772 ± 5	12.4
NGC 5907	SA(s)c	15^{h} 15^{m} 53.8^{s}	+56° 19′ 44″	667 ± 3	11.1

Other possible members galaxies (galaxies listed in only one or two of the lists from the above references) include NGC 5866B, NGC 5963, UGC 9776, and UGC 9816.

== Nearby groups ==
The NGC 5866 Group is located to the northwest of both the M101 Group (which contains the Pinwheel Galaxy (M101) and its companion galaxies) and the M51 Group (which contains the Whirlpool Galaxy (M51), the Sunflower Galaxy (M63), and several other galaxies). The distances to these three groups (as determined from the distances to the individual member galaxies) are similar, which suggests that the M51 Group, the M101 Group, and the NGC 5866 Group are actually part of a large, loose, elongated structure. However, most group identification methods (including those used by the references cited above) identify these three groups as separate entities.

== See also ==
- Leo Triplet – another small group of galaxies
