= NGC 3115 =

Galaxy in the constellation Sextans

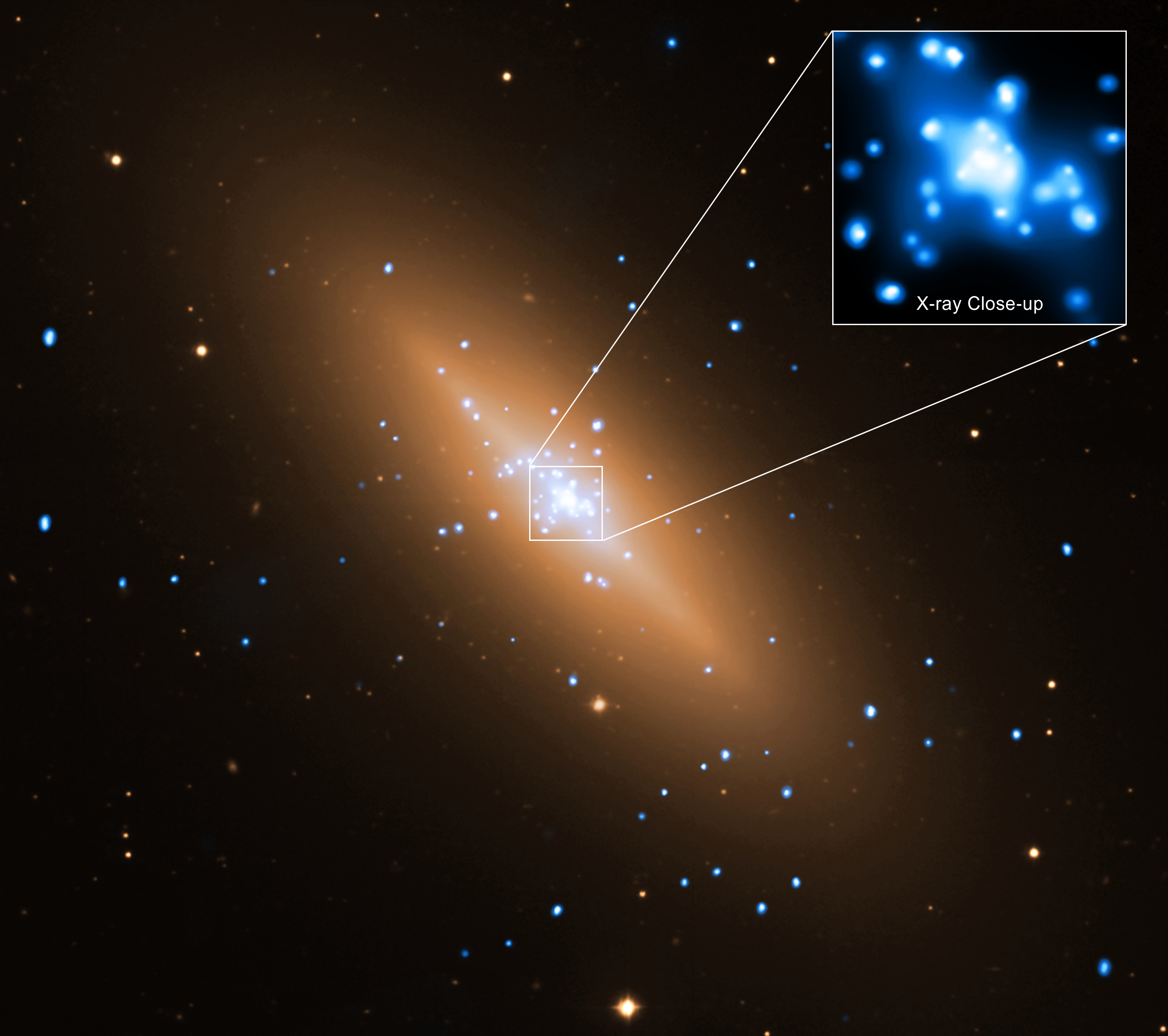
- Composite image of NGC 3115 from the Chandra X-ray Observatory and the Very Large Telescope

Observation data (J2000 epoch)
- Constellation: Sextans
- Right ascension: 10^{h} 05^{m} 14.0^{s}
- Declination: −7° 43′ 07″
- Redshift: 663±4 km/s
- Distance: 31.6 ± 1.3 Mly (9.7 ± 0.4 Mpc)
- Apparent magnitude (V): 9.1

Characteristics
- Type: S0^{−}
- Apparent size (V): 7.2′ × 2.4′

Other designations
- Spindle Galaxy, NGC 3115, UGCA 199, PGC 29265, Spindle Galaxy, UGCA 199, PGC 29265, Caldwell 53

NGC 3115 is a field lenticular (S0) galaxy in the constellation Sextans. Alternatively, it is identified as the Spindle Galaxy or Caldwell 53. The galaxy was discovered by German-British astronomer William Herschel on February 22, 1787. At about 32 million light-years away from Earth, it is several times bigger than the Milky Way. It is a lenticular (S0) galaxy because it contains a disk and a central bulge of stars, but without a detectable spiral pattern. NGC 3115 is seen almost exactly edge-on, but was nevertheless mis-classified as elliptical. There is some speculation that NGC 3115, in its youth, was a quasar.

One supernova has been observed in NGC 3115: SN 1935B (type and mag. unknown).

== Star formation ==
NGC 3115 has consumed most of the gas of its youthful accretion disk. It has very little gas and dust left that would trigger new star formation. The vast majority of its component stars are very old.

== Black hole ==
In 1992 John Kormendy of the University of Hawaii and Douglas Richstone of the University of Michigan announced what was observed to be a supermassive black hole in the galaxy. Based on orbital velocities of the stars in its core, the central black hole has mass measured to be approximately one billion solar masses (M_{☉}). The galaxy appears to have mostly old stars and little or no activity. The growth of its black hole has also stopped.

In 2011, NASA's Chandra X-ray Observatory examined the black hole at the center of the large galaxy. A flow of hot gas toward the supermassive black hole has been imaged, making this the first time clear evidence for such a flow has been observed in any black hole. As gas flows toward the black hole, it becomes hotter and brighter. The researchers found the rise in gas temperature begins at about 700 light years from the black hole, giving the location of the Bondi radius. This suggests that the black hole in the center of NGC 3115 has a mass of about two billion M_{☉}, supporting previous results from optical observations. This would make NGC 3115 the nearest billion-solar-mass black hole to Earth.

== See also ==
- NGC 5866 – another lenticular galaxy sometimes referred to as the Spindle Galaxy
