= NGC 4710 =

Galaxy in the constellation Coma Berenices

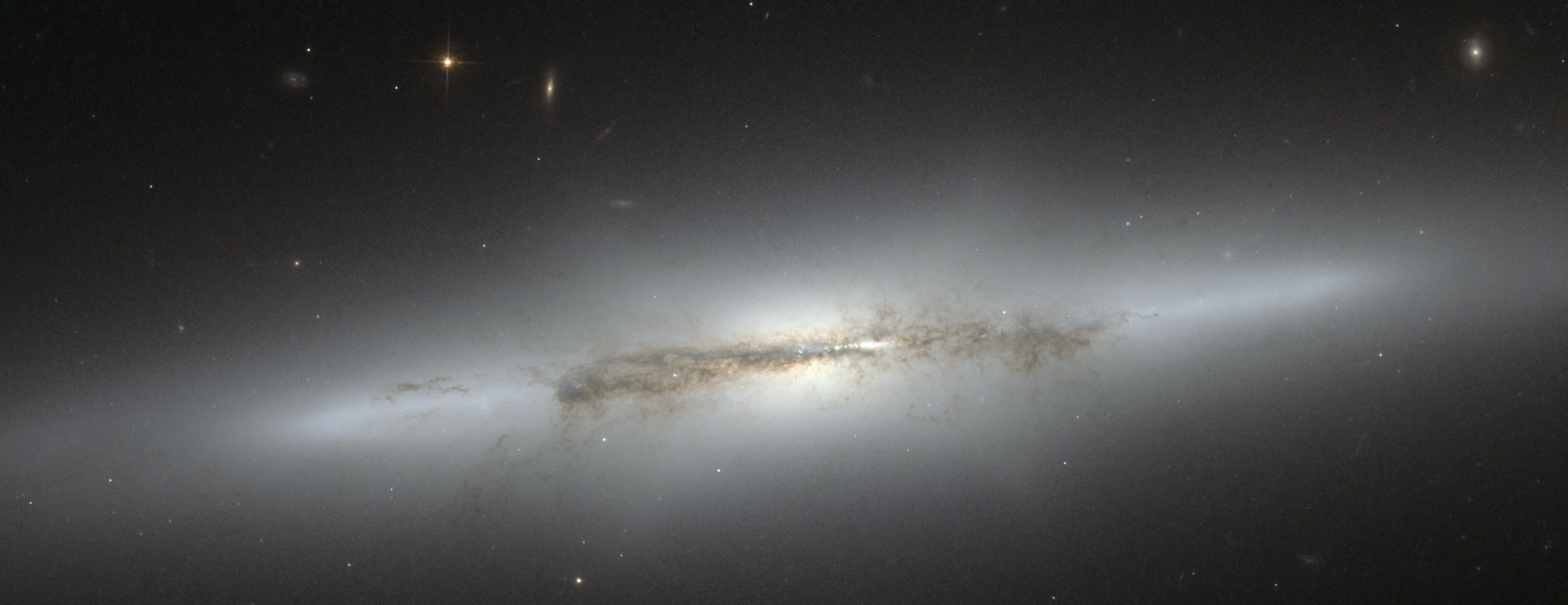
- Hubble Space Telescope image of NGC 4710

Observation data (J2000 epoch)
- Constellation: Coma Berenices
- Right ascension: 12^{h} 49^{m} 38.958^{s}
- Declination: +15° 09′ 55.76″
- Redshift: 0.00397±0.00011
- Heliocentric radial velocity: 1,129 km/s
- Distance: 54.5 ± 3.6 Mly (16.7 ± 1.1 Mpc)
- Apparent magnitude (V): 11.9
- Apparent magnitude (B): 11.60

Characteristics
- Type: S0a-S0/Sa
- Apparent size (V): 3.0′ × 0.8′

Other designations
- NGC 4710, UGC 7980, PGC 43375

NGC 4710 is an edge-on lenticular galaxy in the northern constellation of Coma Berenices. It was discovered on March 21, 1784 by German-British astronomer William Herschel. This galaxy has a B-band visual magnitude of 11.60 and an angular size of 3.0′ × 0.8′. It is located at a distance of 54.5 ± 3.6 million light-years (16.7 ± 1.1 Mpc) from the Milky Way, and is receding with a heliocentric radial velocity of 1,129 km/s. This is a member of the Virgo Cluster, with a projected offset of ~6° from the cluster center and a cluster crossing time of around two billion years.

The morphological classification of NGC 4710 is S0 or SA(r)0, which indicates this is an unbarred lenticular galaxy (SA) with an inner ring structure (r). It is inclined at an angle of 86° to the plane of the sky, with the major axis aligned along a position angle of 207°. NGC 4710 has a relatively high gas abundance with a dusty nucleus. The stellar velocity distribution is characteristic of galaxies with a small bulge. Like the Milky Way, it has an X-shaped bulge which is a probable bar structure; hence it is likely a barred lenticular. The star formation rate is 0.11±0.02 M_{☉}·yr^{−1}. NGC 4710 possesses both thin and thick discs.
