= Omicron Boötis =

Star in the constellation Boötes

ο Boötis
- Location of ο Boötis (circled in red)

Observation data Epoch J2000.0 Equinox J2000.0 (ICRS)
- Constellation: Boötes
- Right ascension: 14^{h} 45^{m} 14.461^{s}
- Declination: +16° 57′ 51.40″
- Apparent magnitude (V): +4.60

Characteristics
- Evolutionary stage: red clump
- Spectral type: G8.5 III
- U−B color index: +0.75
- B−V color index: +0.98

Astrometry
| Radial velocity (R_{v}) | −9.18 km/s |
| Proper motion (μ) | RA: −59.581 mas/yr Dec.: −52.524 mas/yr |
| Parallax (π) | 12.6814±0.1385 mas |
| Distance | 257 ± 3 ly (78.9 ± 0.9 pc) |
| Absolute magnitude (M_{V}) | 0.70 |

Details
| Mass | 2.05 M_{☉} |
| Radius | 11 R_{☉} |
| Luminosity | 85 L_{☉} |
| Surface gravity (log g) | 2.7 cgs |
| Temperature | 4,864±25 K |
| Metallicity [Fe/H] | −0.10 dex |
| Rotational velocity (v sin i) | 3.6 km/s |
| Age | 2.72 Gyr |

Other designations
- ο Boo, 35 Boötis, BD+17°2780, GC 19858, GJ 9493, HD 129972, HIP 72125, HR 5502, SAO 101184

Database references
| SIMBAD | data |

Omicron Boötis is a yellow-hued star in the northern constellation of Boötes. Its name is a Bayer designation that is Latinized from ο Boötis, and abbreviated Omicron Boo or ο Boo. With an apparent visual magnitude of +4.60, it is a fifth magnitude star that is faintly visible to the naked eye. Based upon an annual parallax shift of 12.68 mas as seen from the Earth, it is located at a distance of approximately 257 light-years (78.9 pc). The star is moving closer to the Sun with a radial velocity of −9 km/s.

At the age of 2.72 billion years, this is an evolved G-type giant star with a stellar classification of G8.5 III. It belongs to the so-called red clump, which indicates it is generating energy through helium fusion at its core. Although it displays a higher abundance of barium than is normal for a star of its type, Williams (1975) considers its status as a barium star to be "very doubtful". The star has double the mass of the Sun and has expanded to 11 times the Sun's radius. It is radiating 85 times the Sun's luminosity from its enlarged photosphere at an effective temperature of 4,864 K.
