= NGC 5985 =

Spiral galaxy in the constellation Draco

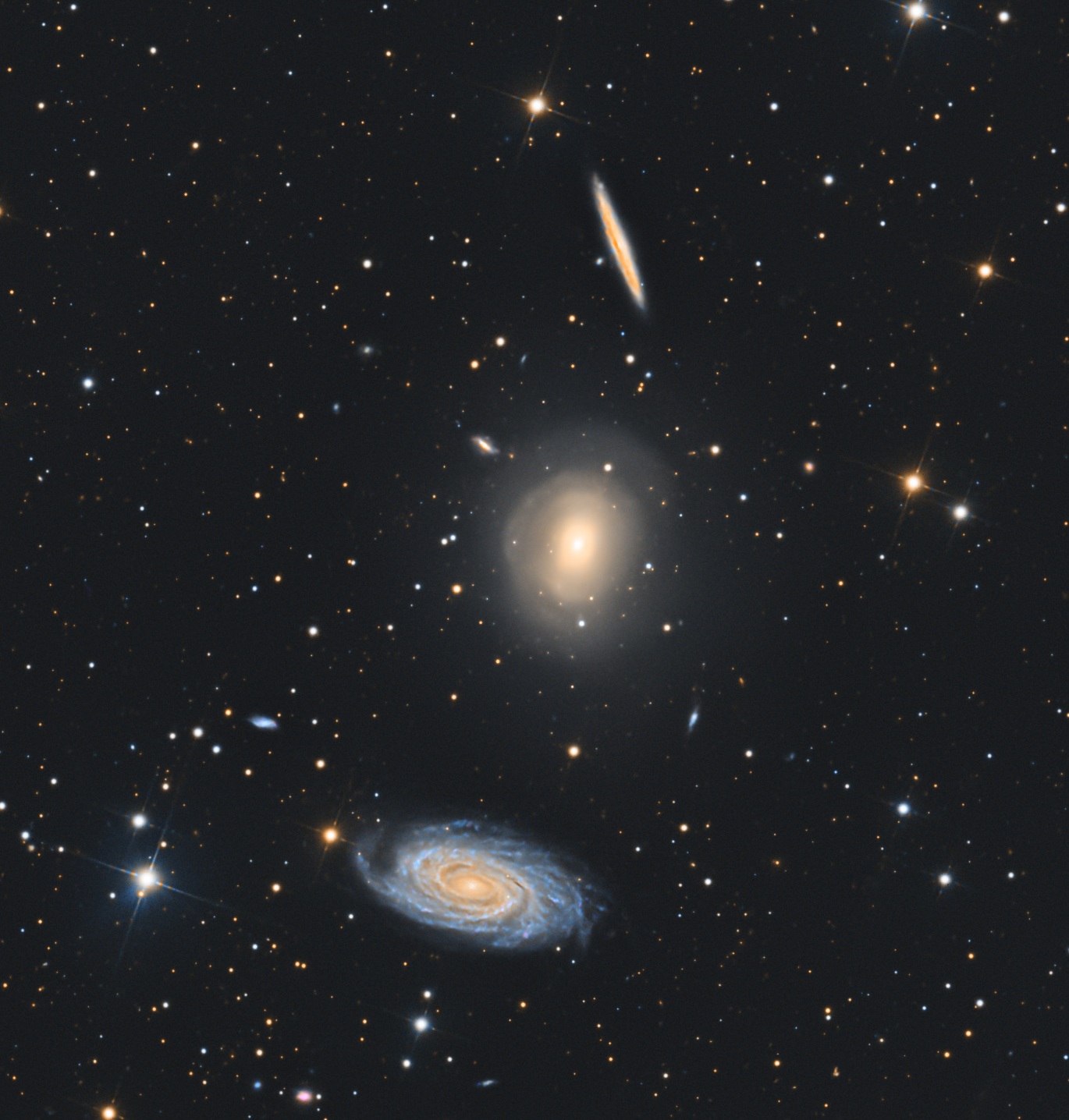
- Draco galaxy triplet with NGC 5985 (bottom), NGC 5982 (middle), and NGC 5981 (top)

Observation data (J2000 epoch)
- Constellation: Draco
- Right ascension: 15^{h} 39^{m} 37.090^{s}
- Declination: +59° 19′ 55.02″
- Redshift: 0.008396
- Heliocentric radial velocity: 2517
- Distance: 140.41 ± 35.18 Mly (43.050 ± 10.785 Mpc)
- Apparent magnitude (V): 14.22
- Apparent magnitude (B): 15.24

Characteristics
- Type: SAB(r)b
- Size: 220,250 ly (67.56 kpc) (diameter; D_{25} isophote)
- Apparent size (V): 5.495′ (major axis)
- Notable features: In a triplet of galaxies

Other designations
- UGC 9969, MGC+10-22-030, PGC 55725

NGC 5985 is a spiral galaxy located in the northern constellation Draco. NGC 5985 was discovered by William Herschel in 1788.

== Gallery ==
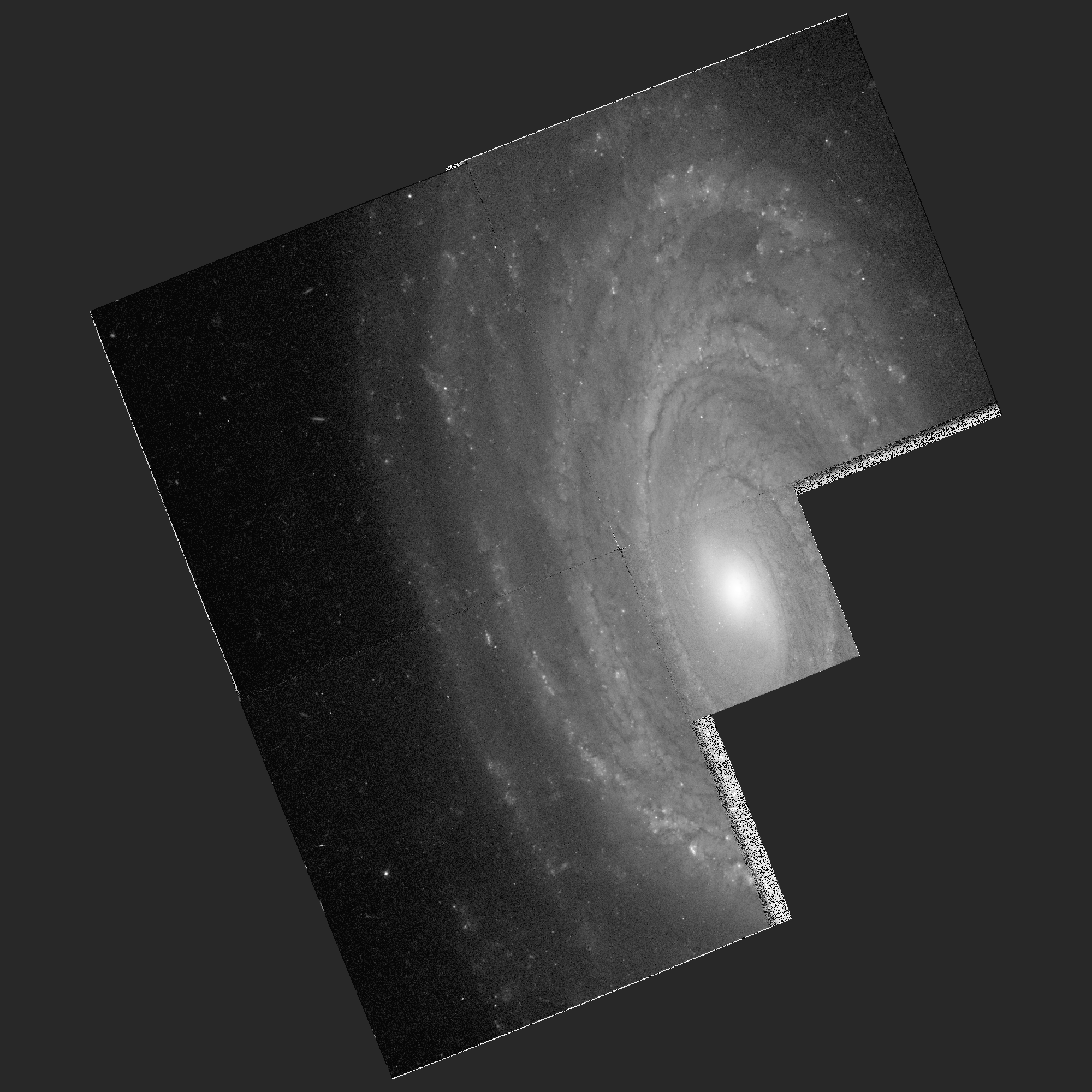
NGC 5985 by Hubble Space Telescope

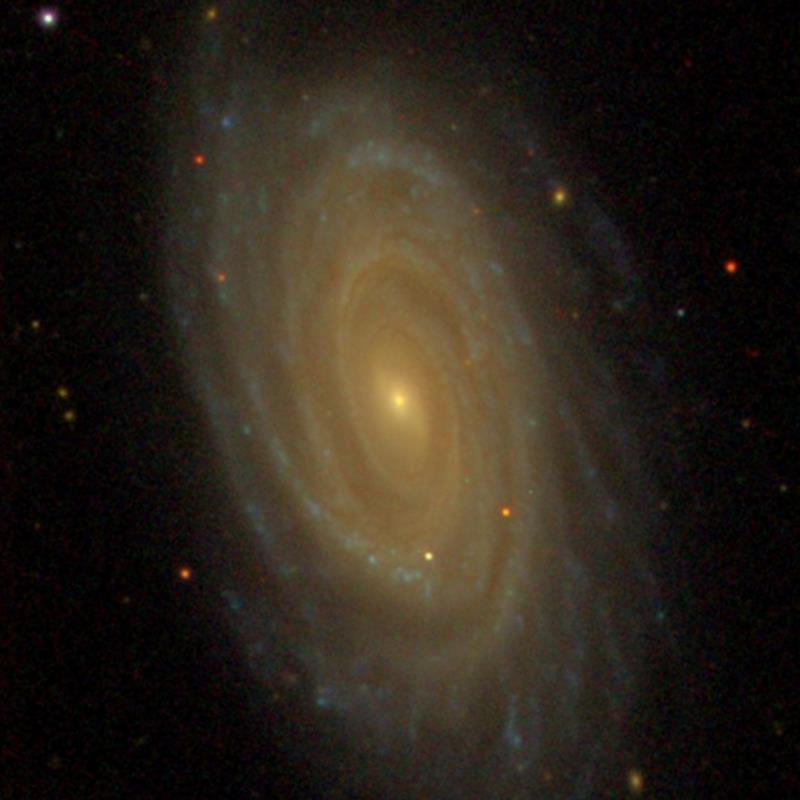
NGC 5985 by Sloan Digital Sky Survey
