= NGC 5982 =

Galaxy in the constellation Draco

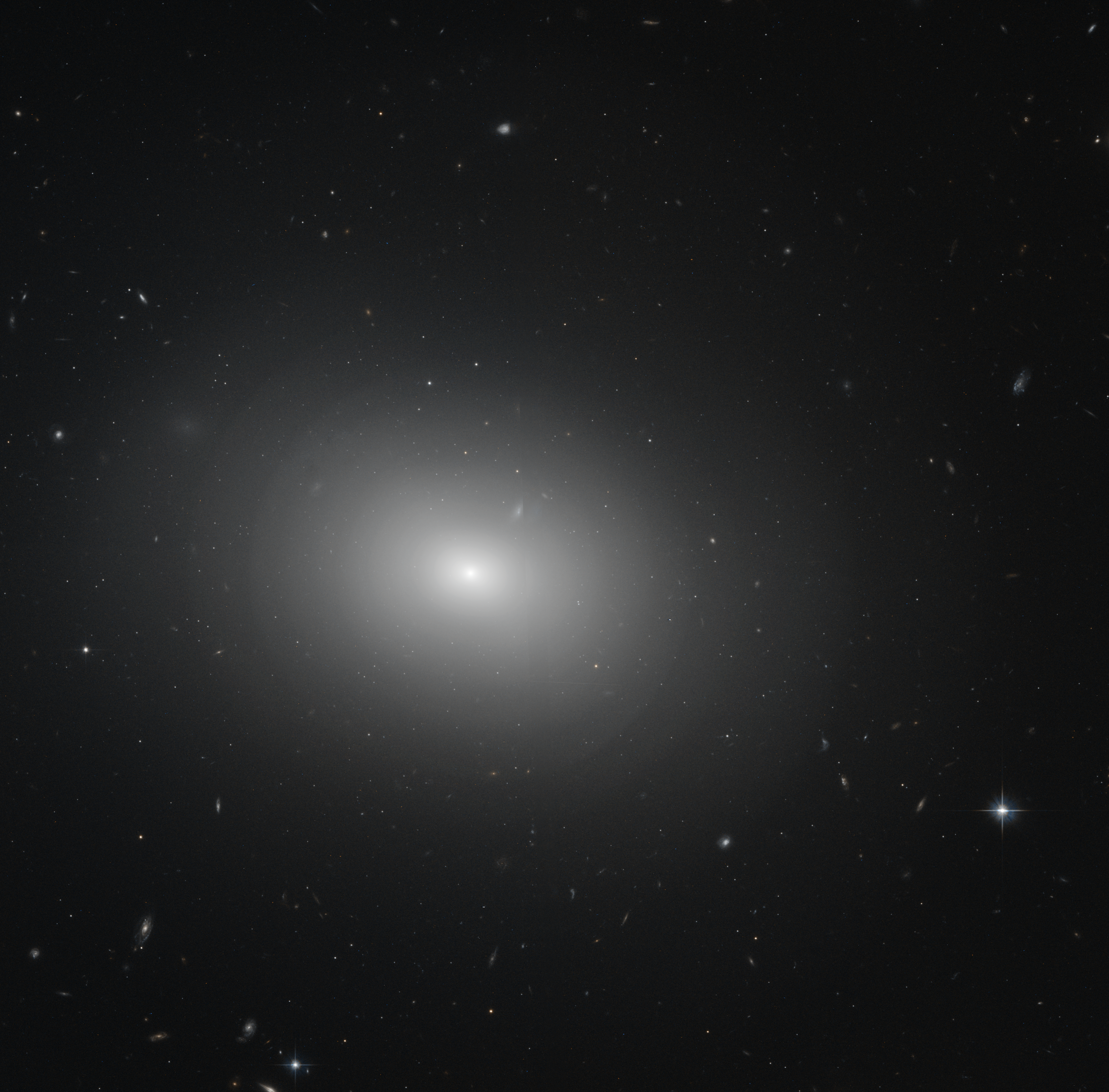
- NGC 5982 by Hubble Space Telescope

Observation data (J2000 epoch)
- Constellation: Draco
- Right ascension: 15^{h} 38^{m} 39.8^{s}
- Declination: +59° 21′ 21″
- Redshift: 0.010064 ± 0.000031
- Heliocentric radial velocity: 3,017 ± 9 km/s
- Distance: 123 ± 34 Mly (37.6 ± 10.5 Mpc)
- Apparent magnitude (V): 11.0

Characteristics
- Type: E3
- Apparent size (V): 3.0′ × 2.1′

Other designations
- UGC 9961, CGCG 297-024, MCG +10-22-029, PGC 55674

NGC 5982 is an elliptical galaxy located in the constellation Draco. It is located at a distance of about 130 million light years from Earth, which, given its apparent dimensions, means that NGC 5982 is about 100,000 light years across. It was discovered by William Herschel on May 25, 1788.

NGC 5982 has a kinematically decoupled nucleus, with its major axis being nearly perpendicular to the rotation of the galaxy. NGC 5982 features many shells in its envelope, nearly 26. The shells form circular arcs, with the further being located at a radius of 150 arcseconds along the major axis of the galaxy, while the innermost one lies 8 arcseconds off the nucleus. The shells and the kinematically decoupled nucleus are the result of the merger of the elliptical galaxy with a small elliptical galaxy.

The galaxy has globular clusters that belong in two populations, red and blue. The age of the globular clusters in NGC 5982 is over 5 billion years. The luminosity of NGC 5982 is dominated by light emitted by old stars. In the centre of NGC 5982 lies a supermassive black hole whose mass is estimated to be 8.3×10^{8} M_{☉} (10^{8.92} M_{☉}) based on the M–sigma relation. The nucleus may display low level activity and has been categorised as a possible LINER.

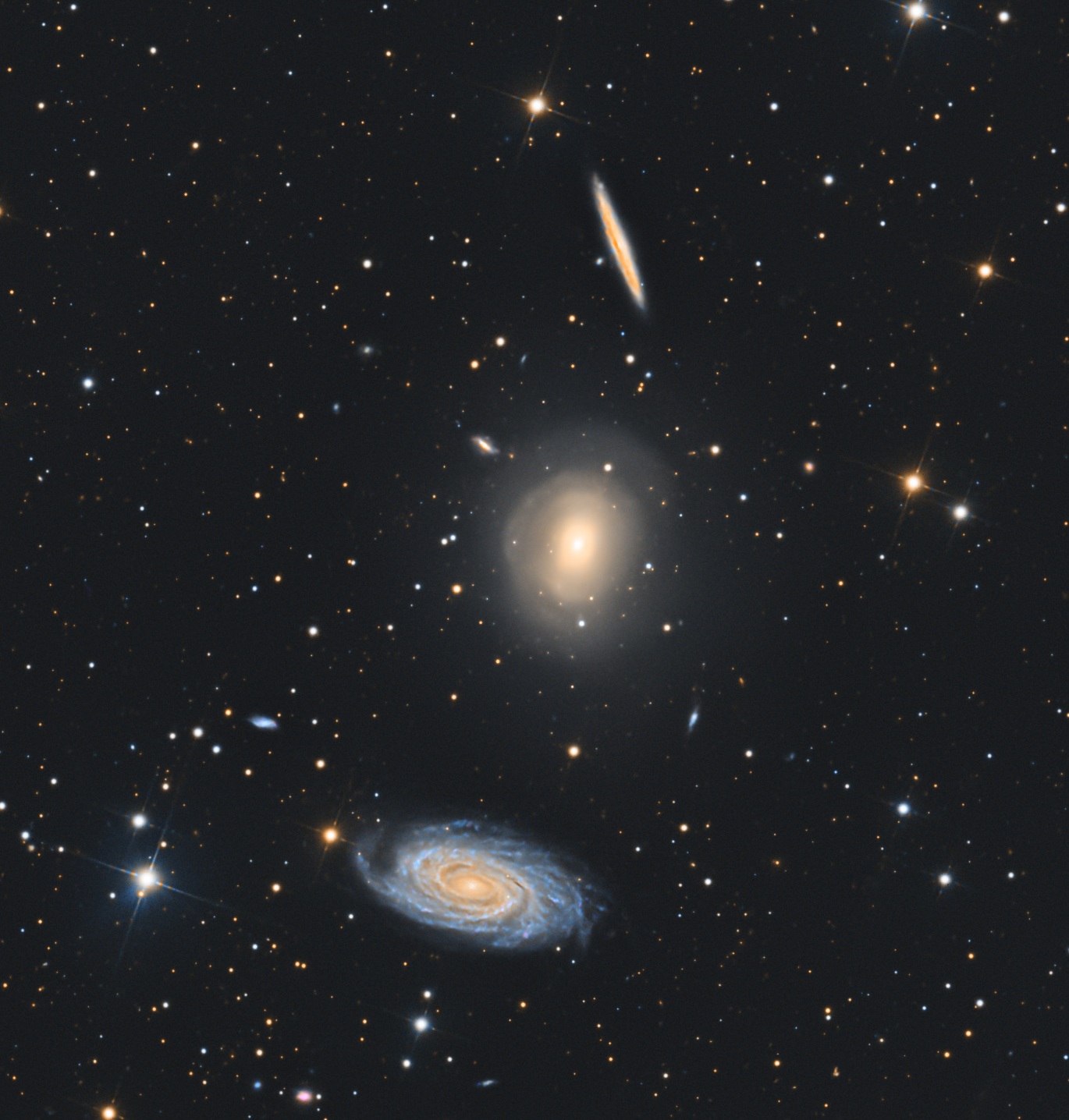
NGC 5981 (top), NGC 5982 (middle), and NGC 5985 (bottom) form a close trio of galaxies.

NGC 5982 belongs to a galaxy group known as the NGC 5982 group. Other members of the group include the galaxies NGC 5976, NGC 5981, NGC 5985, NGC 5987, and NGC 5989. NGC 5981, a spiral galaxy seen edge-on, lies at a separation of 6.3 arcminutes from NGC 5982 and NGC 5985, a spiral galaxy seen face-on, lies at a separation of 7.7 arcminutes. The three galaxies are known as the Draco Trio or the Draco Group, although there is no evidence that they form a compact group.
