= NGC 5820 =

Galaxy in the constellation Boötes

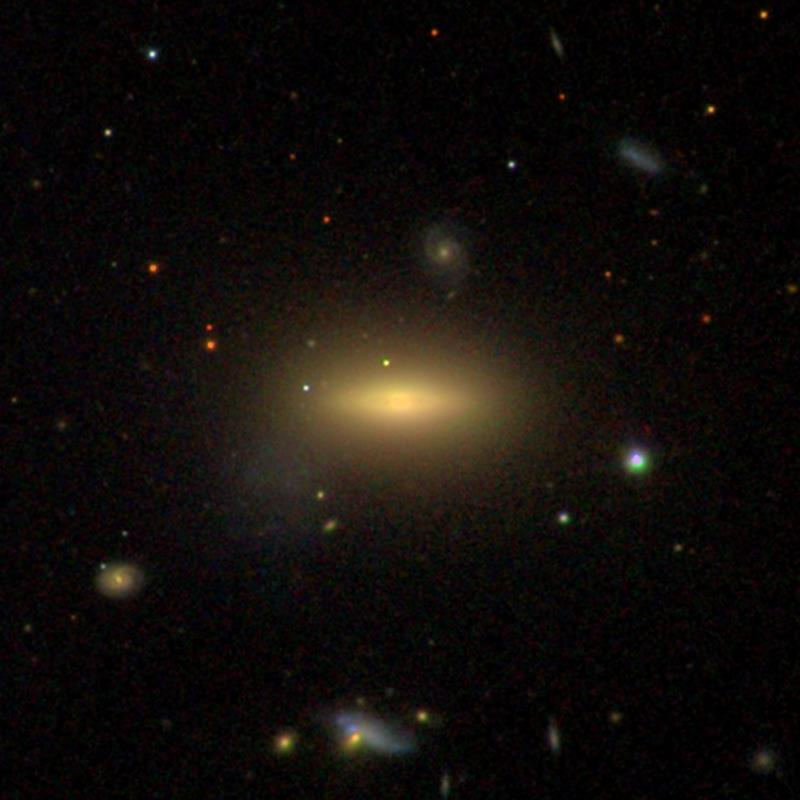
- SDSS image of NGC 5820

Observation data (J2000 epoch)
- Constellation: Boötes
- Right ascension: 14^{h} 58^{m} 39.822^{s}
- Declination: +53° 53′ 10.02″
- Redshift: 0.011124 ± 0.000030 km/s
- Distance: 168.3 Mly (51.61 Mpc)
- Apparent magnitude (V): 11.98

Characteristics
- Type: S0
- Apparent size (V): 1.7′ x 0.1′

Other designations
- 2MASX J14583982+5353100, Arp 136, CGCG 273-038, CGCG 274-004, LEDA 53511, LGG 395-005, MCG+09-25-001, PGC 53511, UGC 9642, UZC J145839.8+535310, Z 273-38, Z 1457.1+5405, Z 274-4

NGC 5820 is a lenticular galaxy in the constellation Boötes. It lies near NGC 5821, a galaxy with a similar mass at the same redshift.
