= NGC 5821 =

Galaxy in the constellation of Boötes

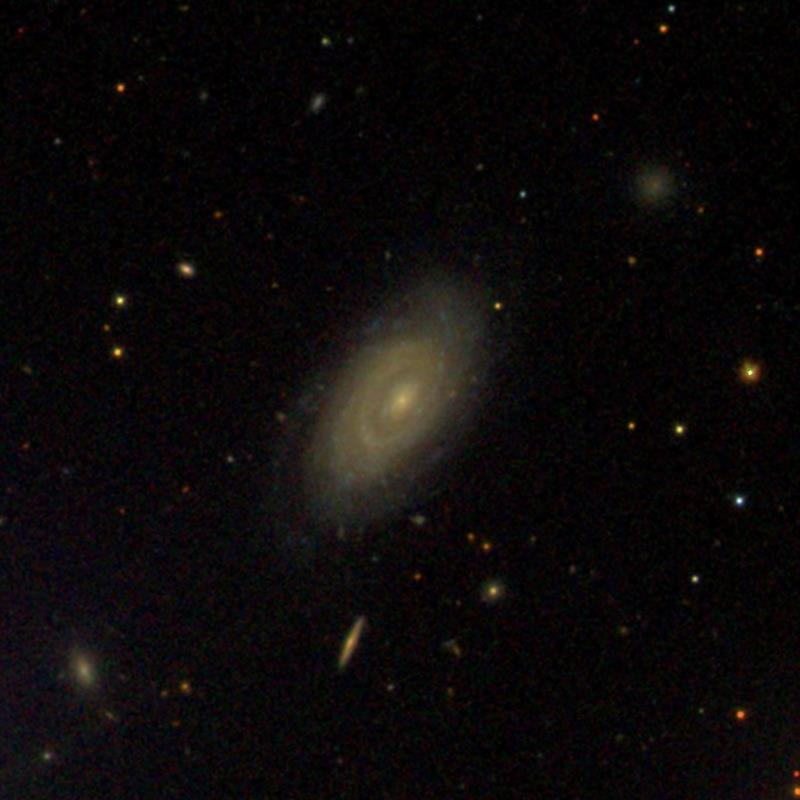
- SDSS image of NGC 5821

Observation data (J2000 epoch)
- Constellation: Boötes
- Right ascension: 14^{h} 58^{m} 59.722^{s}
- Declination: +53° 55′ 23.41″
- Redshift: 0.011261±0.000037 km/s
- Distance: 169.2 Mly (51.89 Mpc)
- Apparent magnitude (V): 14.6

Characteristics
- Type: Sc
- Apparent size (V): 1.31′ × 0.70′

Other designations
- 2MASX J14585972+5355234, CGCG 273-039, CGCG 274-005, IRAS F14575+5407, GC 4028, GC 4030, H 3.811., LEDA 53532, LGG 395-006, MCG+09-25-002, PGC 53532, UGC 9648, UZC J145859.7+535524, Z 273-39, Z 1457.5+5407, Z 274-5

NGC 5821 is a spiral galaxy with a ring structure in the constellation Boötes. It lies near a similarly massed galaxy, NGC 5820, at the same redshift. Both galaxies were discovered by the astronomer William Herschel.
