= NGC 5879 =

Spiral galaxy in the constellation Draco

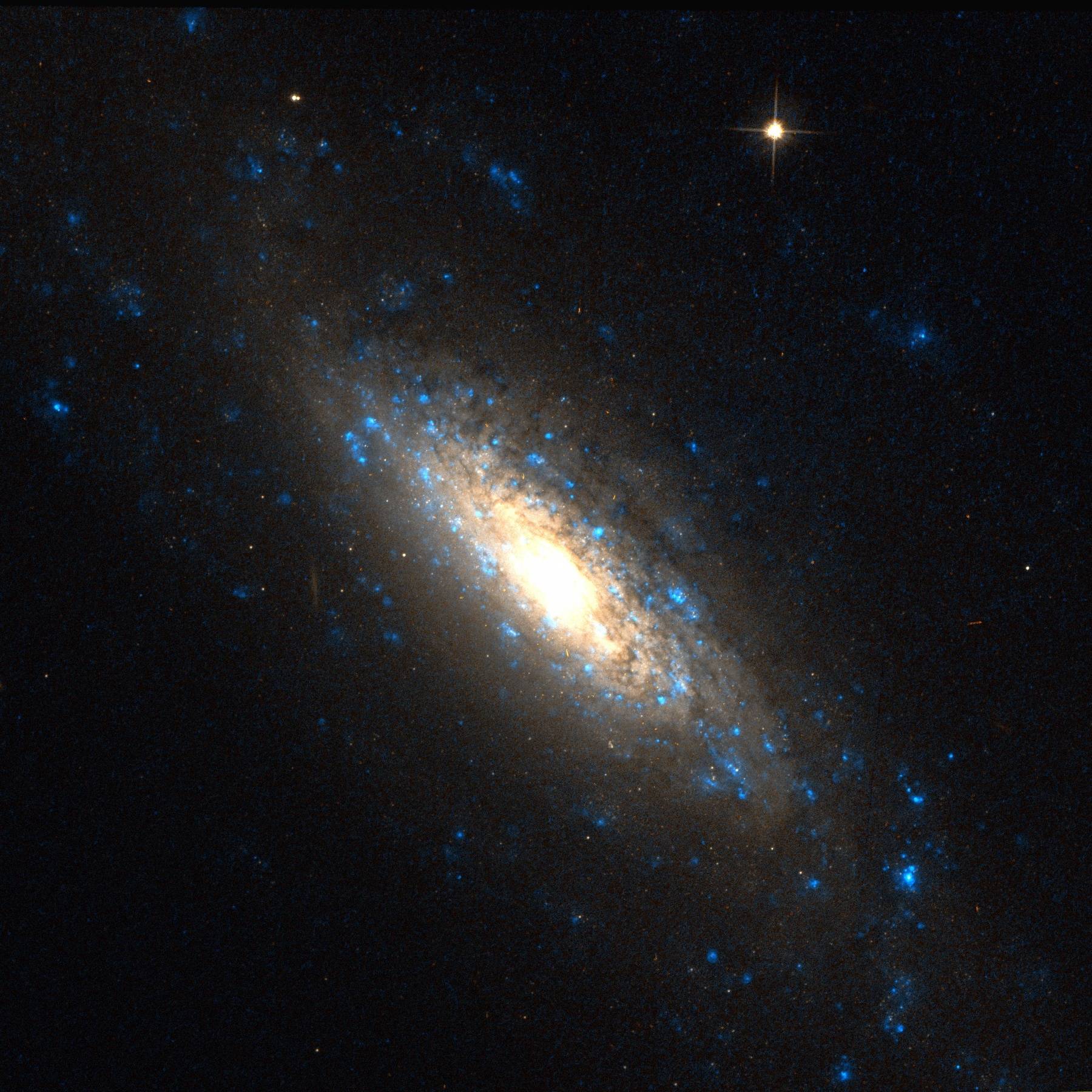
- NGC 5879 by HST, 1.65′ view

Observation data (J2000 epoch)
- Constellation: Draco
- Right ascension: 15^{h} 09^{m} 46.726^{s}
- Declination: +57° 00′ 00.68″
- Redshift: 0.00254
- Heliocentric radial velocity: 761 km
- Distance: 55.6 Mly (17.06 Mpc)
- Apparent magnitude (V): 12.4

Characteristics
- Type: SA(rs)bc:
- Apparent size (V): 3.74′ × 1.01′

Other designations
- UGC 9753, MCG +10-22-001, PGC 54117

NGC 5879 is an unbarred spiral galaxy in the constellation Draco. The galaxy was discovered in 1788 by William Herschel. It is a member of the NGC 5866 Group.

One supernova has been observed in NGC 5879: SN 1954C (type unknown, mag. 14.9) was discovered by Paul Wild on 27 September 1954.
