= NGC 6356 =

Globular cluster in the constellation Ophiuchus

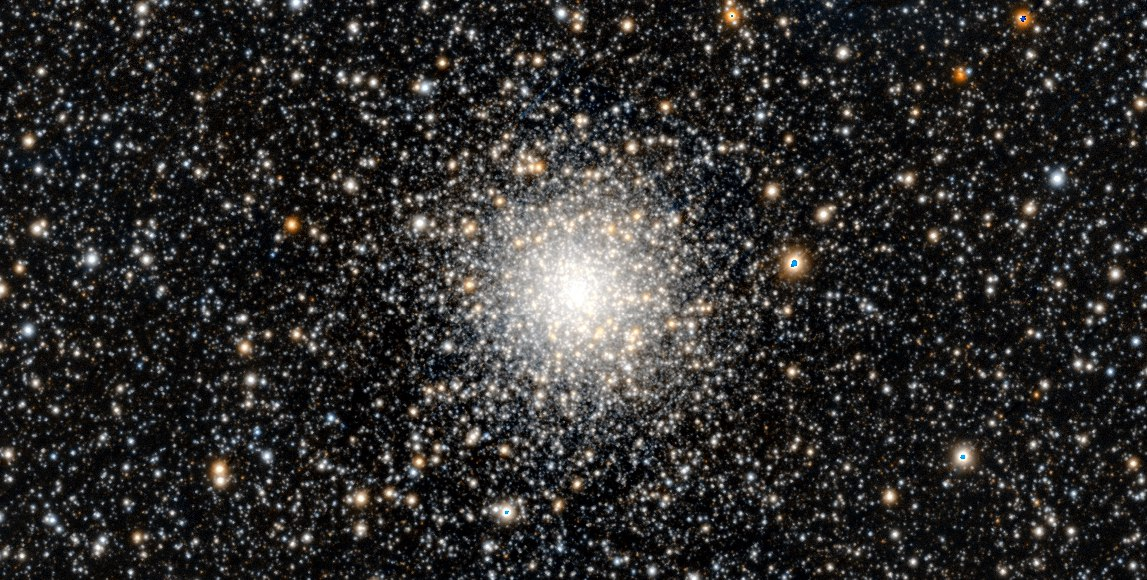
- NGC 6356 as seen through the Hubble Space Telescope

Observation data (J2000 epoch)
- Class: II
- Constellation: Ophiuchus
- Right ascension: 17^{h} 23^{m} 35.0^{s}
- Declination: −17° 48′ 47″
- Apparent magnitude (V): 8.2
- Apparent dimensions (V): 10.00

Physical characteristics
- Absolute magnitude: −8.51
- Metallicity: [Fe/H] = −0.4 dex
- Other designations: GCL 62 and ESO 588-SC1

NGC 6356 is a globular cluster located in the constellation Ophiuchus. It is designated as a II in the Shapley–Sawyer Concentration Class and was discovered by the German-born British astronomer William Herschel on 18 June 1784. The star cluster is more dense and bright towards the middle. NGC 6356 is located 80' north east of the brighter NGC 6333. It is at a distance of 49,600 light years away from Earth.

The cluster is relatively metal-rich and therefore has a large amount of interstellar dust in its core.

== See also ==
- List of NGC objects (6001–7000)
- List of NGC objects
