= Messier 14 =

Globular cluster in Ophiuchus

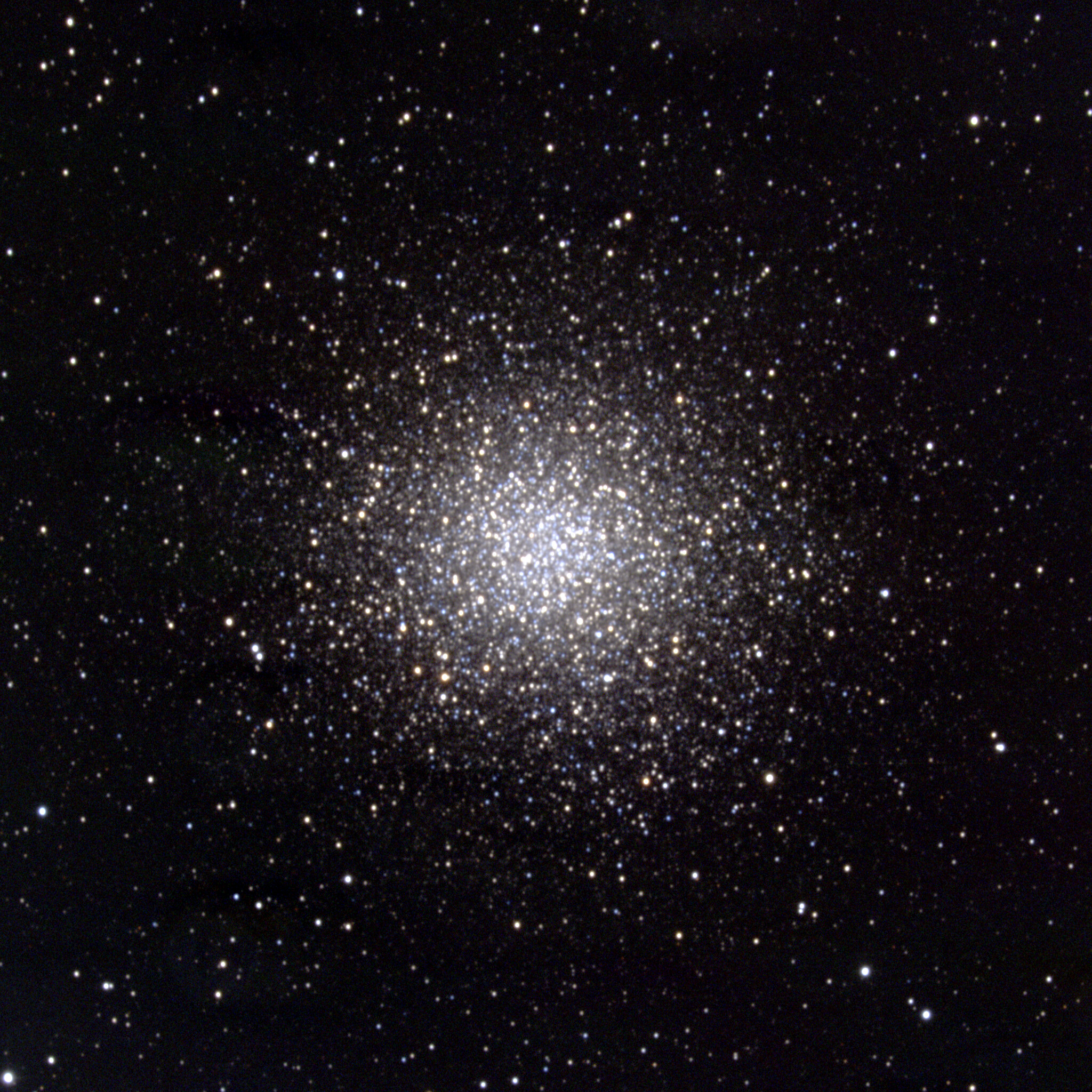
- Globular cluster Messier 14 in Ophiuchus

Observation data (J2000 epoch)
- Class: VIII
- Constellation: Ophiuchus
- Right ascension: 17^{h} 37^{m} 36.15^{s}
- Declination: –03° 14′ 45.3″
- Distance: 30.3 kly (9.3 kpc)
- Apparent magnitude (V): 7.6
- Apparent dimensions (V): 11.0′

Physical characteristics
- Mass: 1.04×10^{6} M_{☉}
- Radius: 50 ly
- Metallicity: [Fe/H] = –1.28 dex
- Other designations: NGC 6402

Messier 14 (also known as M14 or NGC 6402) is a globular cluster of stars in the constellation Ophiuchus. It was discovered by Charles Messier in 1764.

At a distance of about 30,000 light-years, M14 contains several hundred thousand stars. At an apparent magnitude of +7.6 it can be easily observed with binoculars. Medium-sized telescopes will show some hint of the individual stars of which the brightest is of magnitude +14.

The total luminosity of M14 is in the order of 400,000 times that of the Sun corresponding to an absolute magnitude of −9.12. The shape of the cluster is decidedly elongated. M14 is about 100 light-years across.

A total of 70 variable stars are known in M14, many of the W Virginis variety common in globular clusters. In 1938, a nova appeared, although this was not discovered until photographic plates from that time were studied in 1964. It is estimated that the nova reached a maximum brightness of magnitude +9.2, over five times brighter than the brightest 'normal' star in the cluster.

Slightly over 3° southwest of M14 lies the faint globular cluster NGC 6366.

== Gallery ==
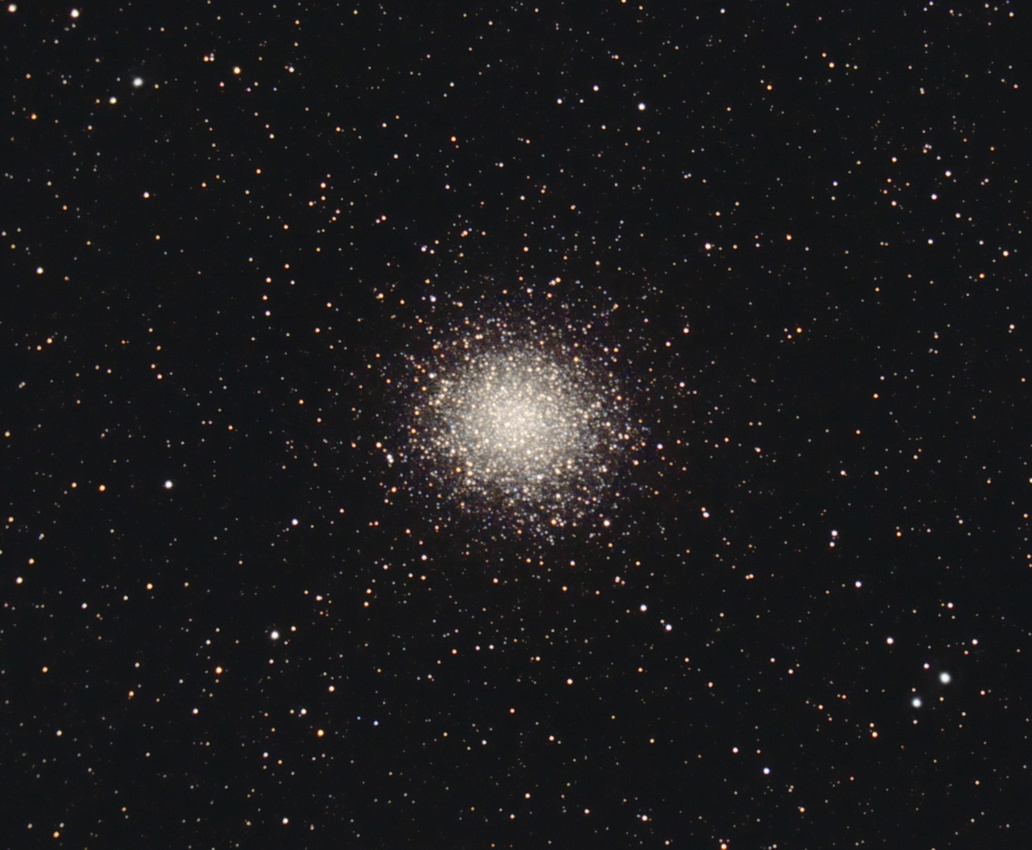
Messier 14 with amateur telescope

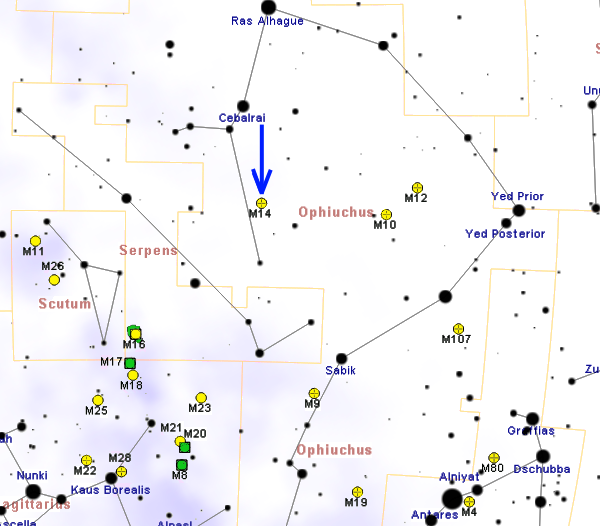
Map showing location of Messier 14

== See also ==
- List of Messier objects
