= Xi Ophiuchi =

Visual binary star system in the constellation Ophiuchus

- Location of ξ Ophiuchi (circled)

Observation data Epoch J2000 Equinox ICRS
- Constellation: Ophiuchus
- Right ascension: 17^{h} 21^{m} 00.37452^{s}
- Declination: −21° 06′ 46.5710″
- Apparent magnitude (V): 4.39

Characteristics
- Evolutionary stage: main sequence
- Spectral type: F2V
- U−B color index: −0.06
- B−V color index: +0.41

Astrometry
Radial velocity (R_{v})	−8.73±0.12 km/s
Proper motion (μ)	RA: +265.543 mas/yr Dec.: −202.584 mas/yr
Parallax (π)	57.0820±0.1851 mas
Distance	57.1 ± 0.2 ly (17.52 ± 0.06 pc)
Absolute magnitude (M_{V})	3.19

Details

A
Mass	1.30 M_{☉}
Radius	1.59±0.06 R_{☉}
Luminosity	4.429±0.035 L_{☉}
Surface gravity (log g)	4.15±0.10 cgs
Temperature	6,611±80 K
Metallicity [Fe/H]	−0.27±0.07 dex
Rotational velocity (v sin i)	20.2±0.7 km/s
Age	916 Myr

Other designations
- Aggia, ξ Oph, 40 Oph, BD−20°4731, FK5 917, GC 23423, GJ 670, HD 156897, HIP 84893, HR 6445, SAO 185296, CCDM J17210-2107AB, WDS J17210-2107AB, LTT 6908

Database references
SIMBAD	A
- B

Xi Ophiuchi (Latinized from ξ Ophiuchi, abbreviated ξ Oph) is a visual binary star system in the equatorial constellation of Ophiuchus. It is sometimes called by the unofficial name Aggia. It has a yellow-white hue and is faintly visible to the naked eye with a combined apparent visual magnitude of 4.39. The system is located approximately 57.1 light-years (17.5 parsecs) away from the Sun based on parallax, but is drifting closer with a radial velocity of -9 km/s.

The magnitude 4.40 primary, designated component A, is an ordinary F-type main-sequence star with a stellar classification of F2V. It is 916 million years old and is rotating with a projected rotational velocity of 20 km/s. The star has 1.3 times the mass of the Sun and 1.6 times the Sun's radius. It is radiating 4.4 times the luminosity of the Sun from its photosphere at an effective temperature of 6,611 K.

The system is a source of X-ray emission. The orbiting companion, component B, is a magnitude 8.9 star at an angular separation of 4.1″ along a position angle of 26° from the primary, as of 2016. A magnitude 10.8 visual companion, component C, lies at a separation of 10.8″, as of 2004.

According to Richard H. Allen's Star Names: Their Lore and Meaning (1899), ξ Oph together with θ Oph formed the Sogdian Wajrik "the Magician", the Khorasmian Markhashik "the Serpent-bitten" and with η Oph the Coptic Tshiō, "the Snake", and Aggia. The Coptic name Aggia was translated by Allen as "the Magician", but may derive from the Greek word αγία 'saint'. The name Aggia for this star appears in some NASA publications: a 1971 list of named stars and a 2023 list of target stars for the Habitable Worlds Observatory, but as of 2026 it does not appear in the IAU Catalog of Star Names.
