= RIK-210 =

Star located in Ophiuchus

Observation data Epoch J2000 Equinox
- Constellation: Ophiuchus
- Right ascension: 16^{h} 23^{m} 24.544^{s}
- Declination: −17° 17′ 27.14″

Characteristics
- Evolutionary stage: pre-main sequence star
- Spectral type: M2.5
- Apparent magnitude (Kp): 13.7
- Apparent magnitude (B): 16.213 ± 0.066
- Apparent magnitude (V): 14.630 ± 0.137
- Apparent magnitude (J): 10.61 ± 0.02
- Apparent magnitude (H): 9.85 ± 0.02
- Apparent magnitude (K): 9.65 ± 0.02
- B−V color index: 1.583 ± 0.203
- V−R color index: 0.537 ± 0.255
- R−I color index: 1.231 ± 0.217
- J−H color index: 0.76 ± 0.04
- J−K color index: 0.96 ± 0.04
- Variable type: EW

Astrometry
Distance	145 ± 20 pc

Details
Mass	0.53 ± 0.13 M_{☉}
Radius	1.24 ± 0.125 R_{☉}
Temperature	3500 K
Rotation	5.5 d
Rotational velocity (v sin i)	11 ± 1 km/s^{−1} km/s
Age	7.5 ± 2.5 Myr

Other designations
- 2MASS J16232454-1717270, EPIC 205483258

Database references
SIMBAD	data
Exoplanet Archive	data

Data sources:

arXiv:1612.03907 [astro-ph.SR], SIMBAD, NStED

RIK-210 is a star located in the constellation Ophiuchus. It is known for its mysterious dimming events. The dips are observed with stable period of 5.667 days, but their triangular shape is inconsistent with the planetary eclipses. Instead, the diffuse cloud on synchronous orbit may be responsible.
