= Messier 9 =

Globular cluster in Ophiuchus

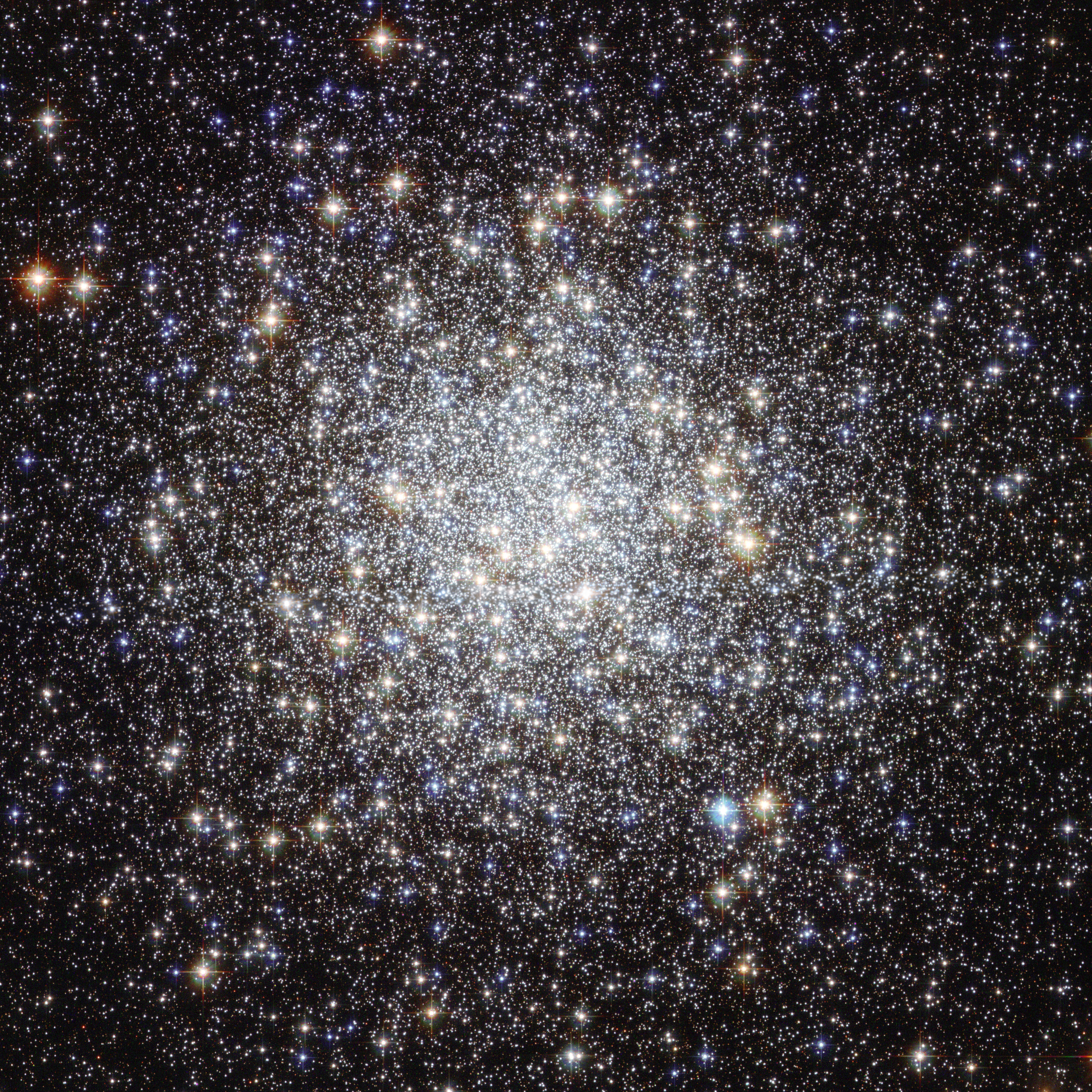
- Messier 9 by HST

Observation data (J2000 epoch)
- Class: VIII
- Constellation: Ophiuchus
- Right ascension: 17^{h} 19^{m} 11.78^{s}
- Declination: –18° 30′ 58.5″
- Distance: 25.8 kly (7.9 kpc)
- Apparent magnitude (V): 7.7
- Apparent dimensions (V): 9.3′

Physical characteristics
- Mass: 4.22×10^{5} M_{☉}
- Radius: 45 ly
- Metallicity: [Fe/H] = –1.77 dex
- Estimated age: 12.0 Gyr
- Other designations: HD 156587, NGC 6333

Messier 9 or M9 (also designated NGC 6333) is a globular cluster in the constellation of Ophiuchus. It is positioned in the southern part of the constellation to the southwest of Eta Ophiuchi, and lies atop a dark cloud of dust designated Barnard 64. The cluster was discovered by French astronomer Charles Messier on June 3, 1764, who described it as a "nebula without stars". In 1783, English astronomer William Herschel was able to use his reflector to resolve individual stars within the cluster. He estimated the cluster to be 7–8′ in diameter with stars densely packed near the center.

M9 has an apparent magnitude of 7.9, an angular size of 9.3′, and can be viewed with a small telescope. It is one of the nearer globular clusters to the center of the galaxy as is around 5,500 light-years from the Galactic Center. Its distance from Earth is 25,800 light-years.

The total luminosity of this cluster is around 120,000 times that of the Sun, the absolute magnitude being −8.04. The brightest individual stars in M9 are of apparent magnitude 13.5, making them visible in moderately sized telescopes. There have been 24 variable stars found in M9: 21 RR Lyrae variables, plus a long-period variable, Type II Cepheid, and an eclipsing binary. No blue stragglers or SX Phoenicis variables have been discovered. Based upon the periods of the RR Lyr variables, this cluster is classified as an Oosterhoff type II globular, which precludes an extra-galactic origin.

At about 80' (1 1/3 degrees) to the northeast of M9 is the dimmer globular cluster NGC 6356, while about the same to the southeast is the globular NGC 6342.

== Gallery ==
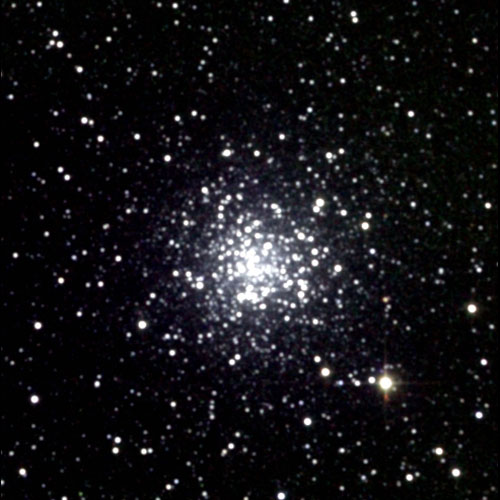
Messier 9, from 2MASS

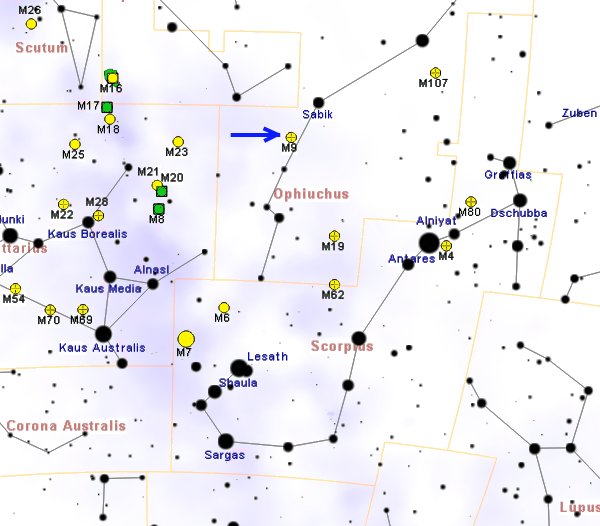
Map showing the location of Messier 9

== See also ==
- List of Messier objects
