= NGC 6366 =

Globular cluster in the constellation Ophiuchus

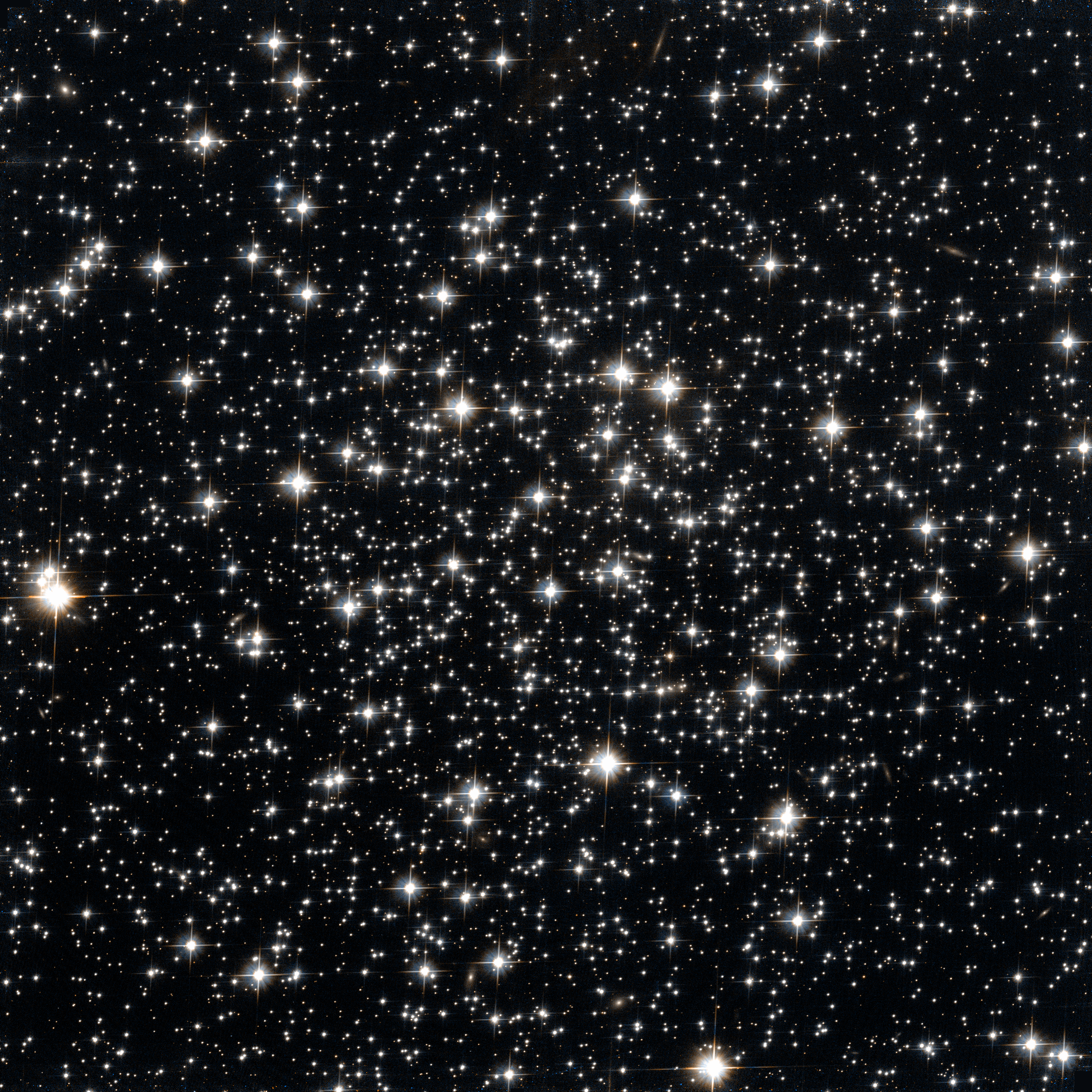
- NGC 6366 as seen through the Hubble Space Telescope

Observation data (J2000 epoch)
- Class: XI
- Constellation: Ophiuchus
- Right ascension: 17^{h} 27^{m} 44.3^{s}
- Declination: −05° 04′ 36″
- Apparent magnitude (V): 9.5
- Apparent dimensions (V): 13.0'

Physical characteristics
- Absolute magnitude: −5.47
- Metallicity: [Fe/H] = = −0.60±0.03 dex
- Other designations: GCL 65

NGC 6366 is a globular cluster located in the constellation Ophiuchus. It is designated as XI in the Shapley–Sawyer Concentration Class and was discovered by the German astronomer Friedrich August Theodor Winnecke on 12 April 1860. It is at a distance of 11,700 light years away from Earth.

NGC 6366 is similar in composition to M 71 or NGC 6342. It is metal-rich for a globular cluster, and all of its stars appears to have formed in the same epoch.

== See also ==
- List of NGC objects (6001–7000)
- List of NGC objects
