= NGC 6342 =

Globular cluster in the constellation Ophiuchus

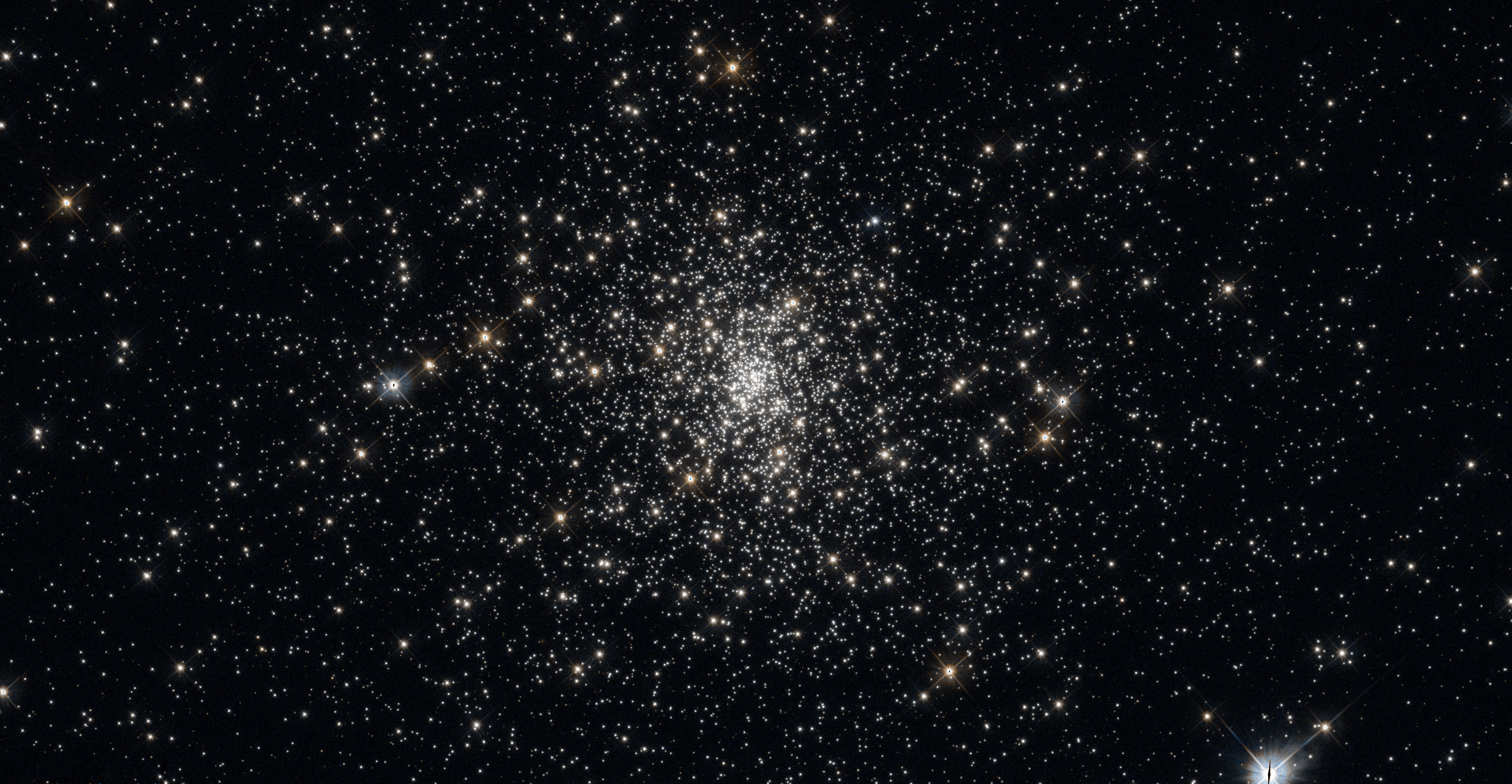
- NGC 6342 as seen through the Hubble Space Telescope

Observation data (J2000 epoch)
- Class: IV
- Constellation: Ophiuchus
- Right ascension: 17^{h} 21^{m} 10.1^{s}
- Declination: −19° 35′ 15″
- Apparent magnitude (V): 9.66
- Apparent dimensions (V): 4.40′

Physical characteristics
- Absolute magnitude: −6.42
- Metallicity: [Fe/H] = −0.55 dex
- Other designations: GCL 61 and ESO 587-SC6

NGC 6342 is a globular cluster located in the constellation Ophiuchus. Its Shapley–Sawyer Concentration Class is IV, and it was discovered by the German-born British astronomer William Herschel on 28 May 1786. It is at a distance of 28,000 light years away from Earth.

NGC 6342 is classified as metal-rich, yet has only one generation of stars.

== See also ==
- List of NGC objects (6001–7000)
- List of NGC objects
- NGC 6366
- Messier 71
