= Messier 71 =

Globular cluster in the constellation Sagitta

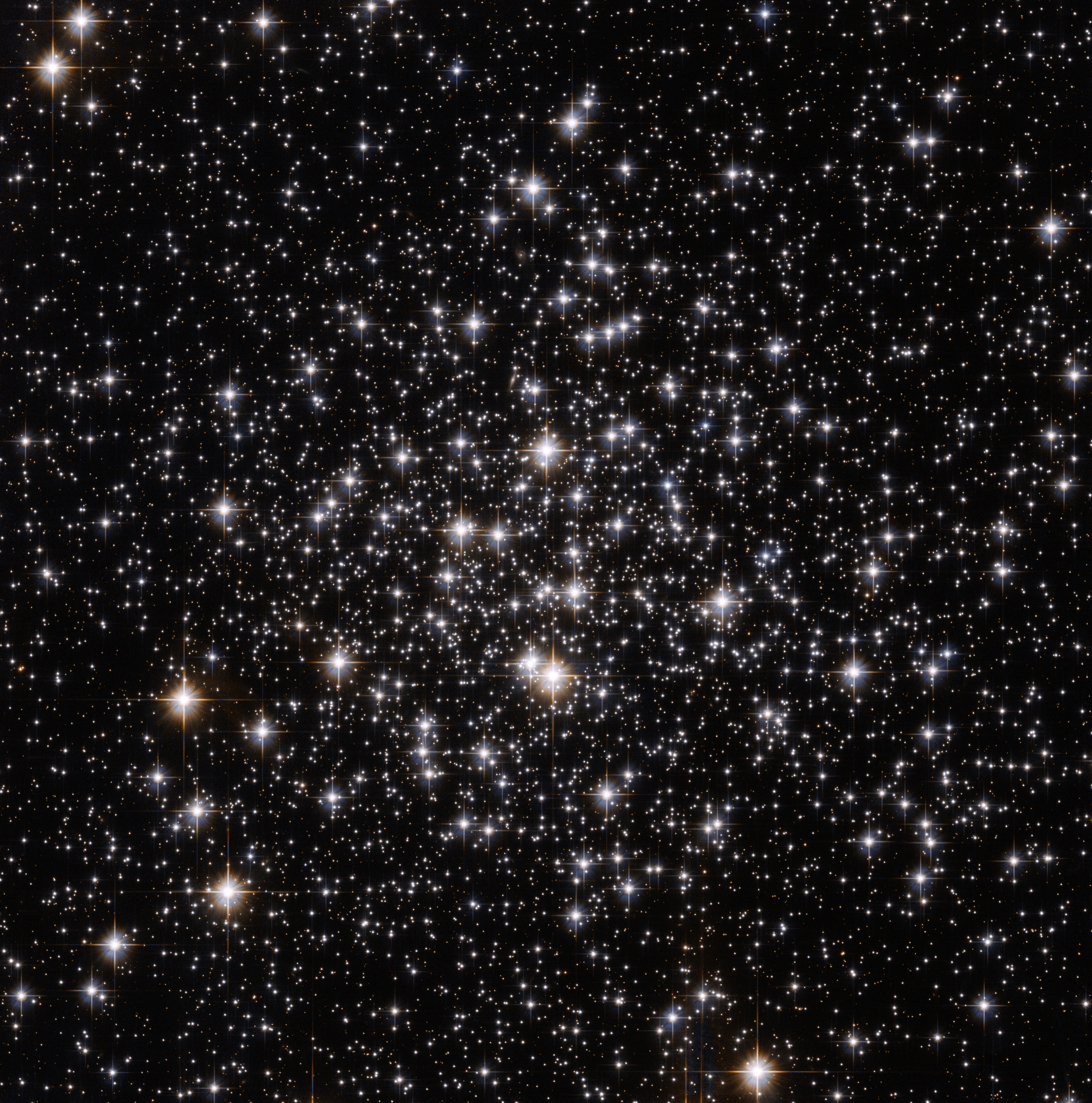
- The globular cluster Messier 71 by the Hubble Space Telescope.

Observation data (J2000 epoch)
- Class: X–XI
- Constellation: Sagitta
- Right ascension: 19^{h} 53^{m} 46.49^{s}
- Declination: +18° 46′ 45.1″
- Distance: 13.0 kly (4.0 kpc)
- Apparent magnitude (V): 8.2
- Apparent dimensions (V): 7.2'

Physical characteristics
- Mass: 1.7×10^{4} M_{☉}
- Radius: 13 ly
- Metallicity: [Fe/H] = –0.78 dex
- Estimated age: 9–10 Gyr
- Other designations: M71, NGC 6838, Cr 409, GCl 115

Messier 71 (also known as M71, NGC 6838, or the Angelfish Cluster) is a globular cluster in the small northern constellation Sagitta. It was discovered by Philippe Loys de Chéseaux in 1745 and included by Charles Messier in his catalog of non-comet-like objects in 1780. It was also noted by Koehler at Dresden around 1775. Messier 71 is also known as NGC 6839, though this identification is very uncertain.

This star cluster is about 13,000 light years away from Earth and spans 27 light-years (8 pc). The irregular variable star Z Sagittae is a member.

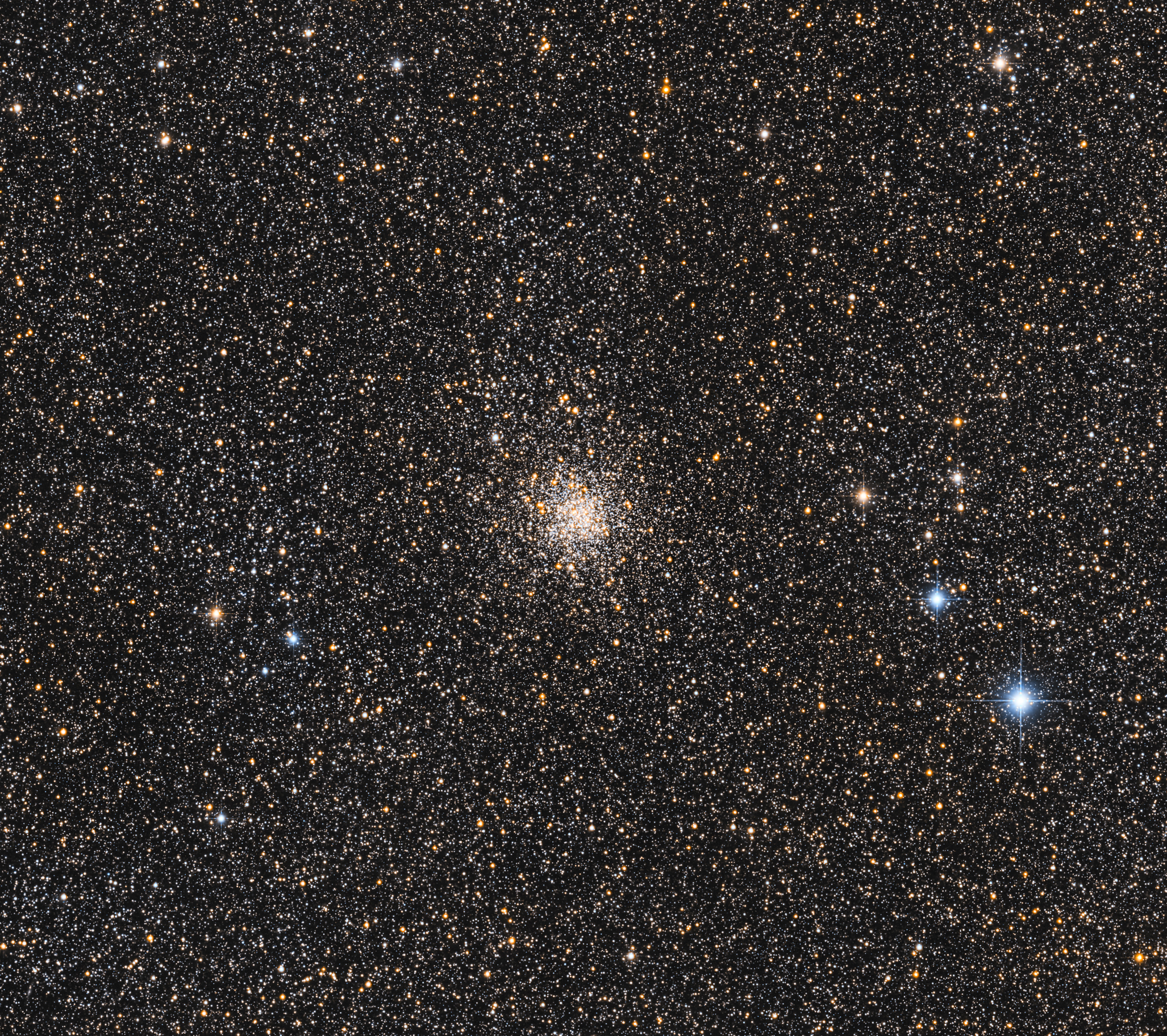
The M71 globular cluster at the center is surrounded by a dense Milky Way star field.

M71 was for many decades thought (until the 1970s) to be a densely packed open cluster and was classified as such by leading astronomers in the field of star cluster research due to its lacking a dense central compression, and to its stars having more "metals" than is usual for an ancient globular cluster; furthermore, it lacks the RR Lyrae "cluster" variable stars that are common in most globular clusters. However, modern photometric photometry has detected a short "horizontal branch" in the H–R diagram (chart of temperature versus luminosity) which is characteristic of a globular cluster. The shortness of the branch explains the lack of RR Lyrae variables and is due to the globular cluster's relatively young age of 9–10 billion years. Taking in many or only late series (Population I) stars explains relatively its stars. Hence today M71 is designated as a very loosely concentrated globular cluster, much like M68 in Hydra. M71 has a mass of about 53,000 M_{☉} and a luminosity of around 19,000 L_{☉}.

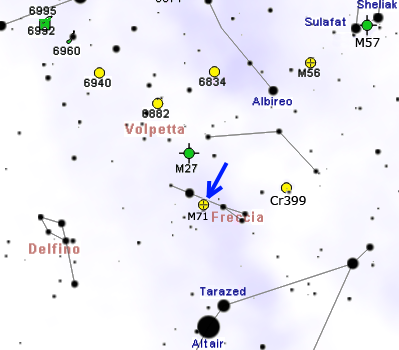
Map showing location of M71

== See also ==
- List of Messier objects
- NGC 6366
- NGC 6342

== Gallery ==
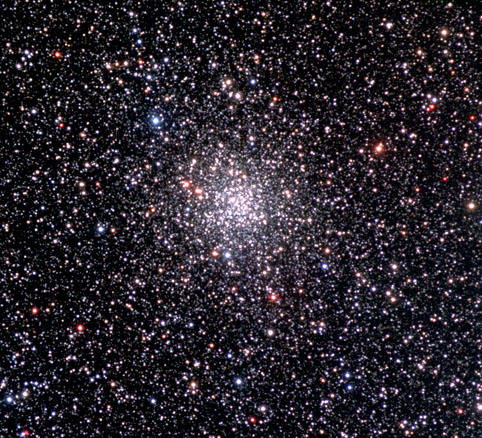
Till Credner and Sven Kohle, Calar Alto Observatory.

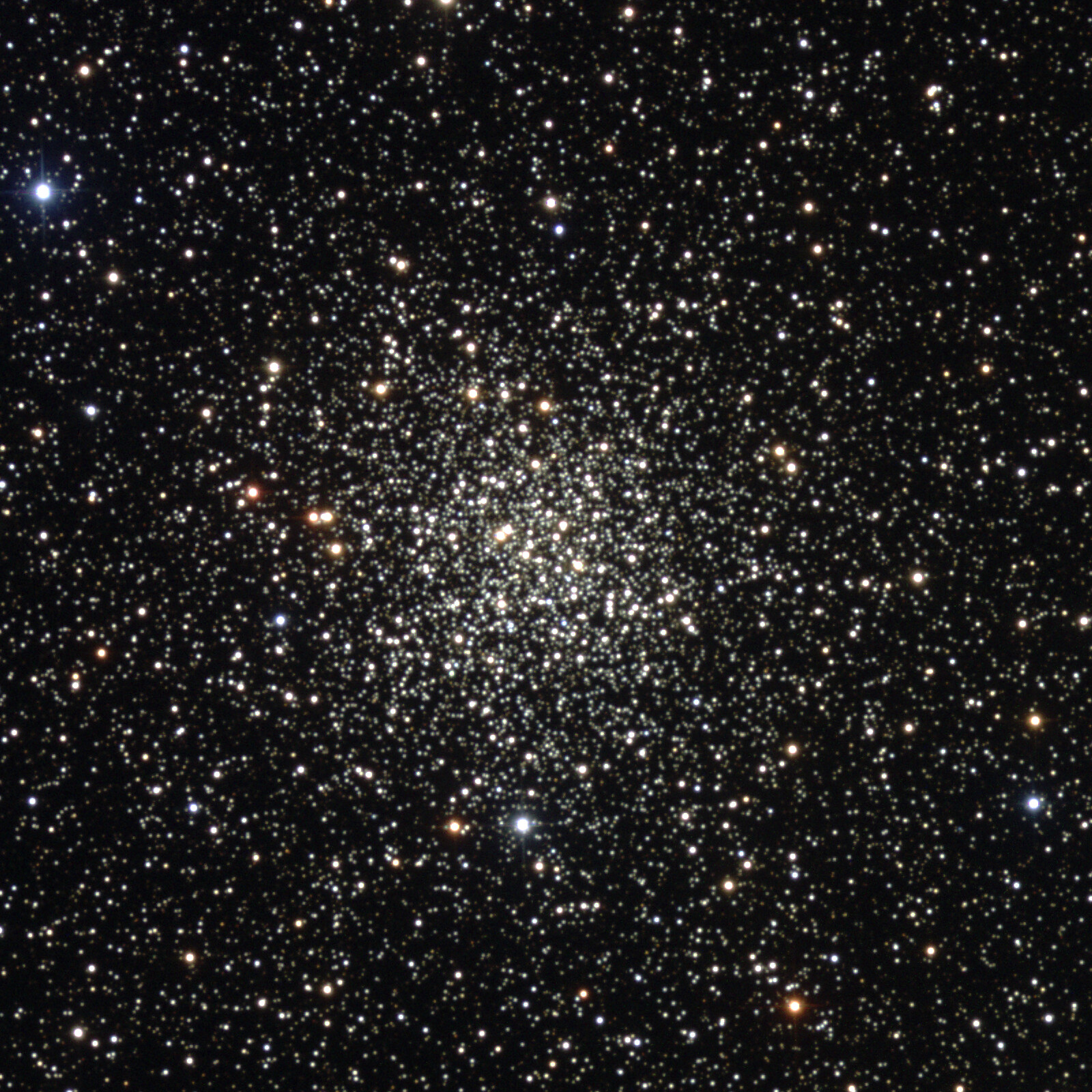
M71 in visible light by the NOAO.

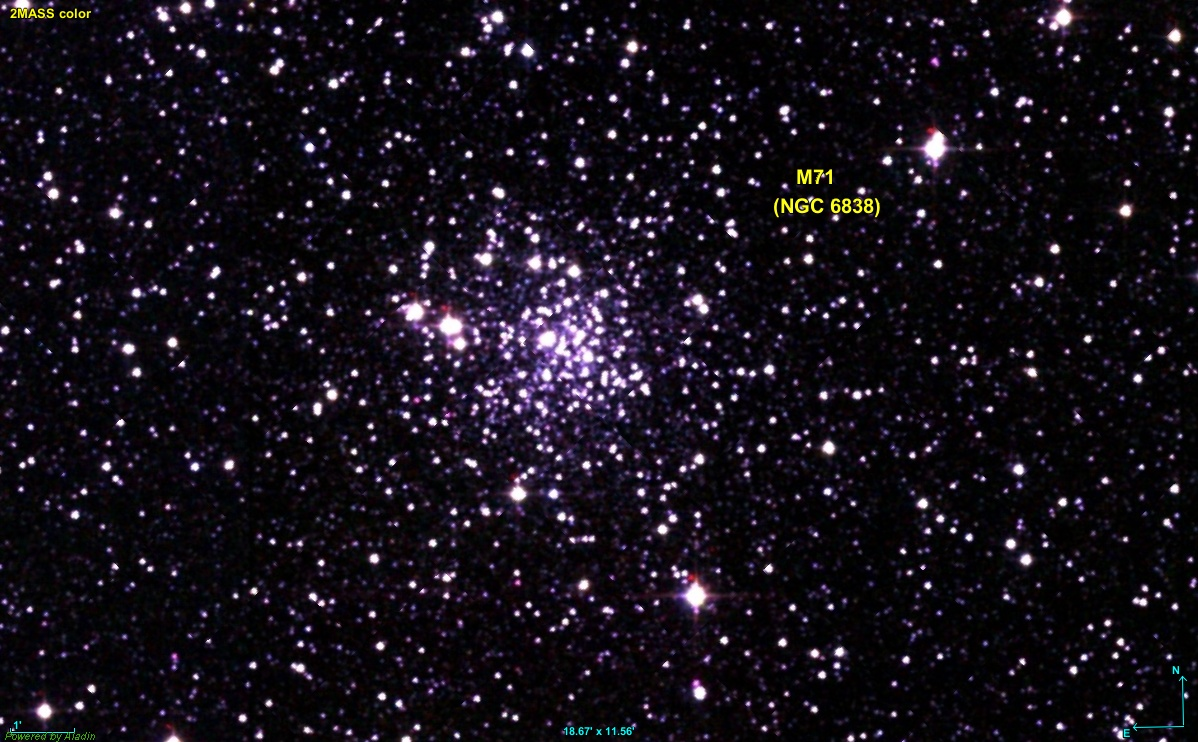
M71 in infrared by the survey 2MASS.
