= Theta Ophiuchi =

Star in the constellation Ophiuchus

- Location of θ Ophiuchi (circled)

Observation data Epoch J2000 Equinox ICRS
- Constellation: Ophiuchus
- Right ascension: 17^{h} 22^{m} 00.57935^{s}
- Declination: −24° 59′ 58.3670″
- Apparent magnitude (V): 3.25 - 3.31

Characteristics
- Spectral type: B2 IV
- U−B color index: −0.86
- B−V color index: −0.23
- Variable type: β Cep

Astrometry
Radial velocity (R_{v})	−2 km/s
Proper motion (μ)	RA: −7.37 mas/yr Dec.: −23.94 mas/yr
Parallax (π)	7.48±0.17 mas
Distance	436 ± 10 ly (134 ± 3 pc)
Absolute magnitude (M_{V})	−2.4

Details

θ Oph Aa
Mass	8.6±0.2 M_{☉}
Radius	5.07±0.11 R_{☉}
Luminosity	4,740–6,230 L_{☉}
Surface gravity (log g)	3.950±0.006 cgs
Temperature	22,260±280 K
Metallicity [Fe/H]	−0.15±0.12 dex
Rotational velocity (v sin i)	30 km/s
Age	20.6±3.2 Myr

θ Oph B
Mass	5.4 M_{☉}
Radius	3.03–3.12 R_{☉}
Luminosity	738–844 L_{☉}
Surface gravity (log g)	2.87–2.93 cgs
Temperature	17,700 K
Rotational velocity (v sin i)	150 km/s
Age	18.4–20.2 Myr

Other designations
- θ Ophiuchi, 42 Ophiuchi, CD−24 13292, FK5 644, GC 23451, HD 157056, HIP 84970, HR 6453, SAO 185320

Database references
SIMBAD	data

Theta Ophiuchi, Latinized from θ Ophiuchi, is a multiple star system in the equatorial constellation of Ophiuchus. It lies on the "right foot" of the serpent-bearer, just southwest of Kepler's Star, the nova of 1604. This star has an apparent visual magnitude of +3.3, making it readily visible to the naked eye. Based upon parallax measurements from the Hipparcos mission, it is roughly 436 light-years (134 parsecs) from Earth. It is 1.8 degrees south of the ecliptic and therefore subject to lunar occultations and (very rarely) occulted by a planet. The next occultation by a planet will be by Mars on 3 October 2078.

Theta Ophiuchi appears to be a triple star system. The two inner stars make up a spectroscopic binary with an orbital period of 56.71 days and an eccentricity of 0.17. The third component is 5.5 magnitude star with a stellar classification of B5. Its angular separation from the binary pair is 0.15 arcseconds. This system is a proper motion member of the Upper Scorpius sub-group in the Scorpius–Centaurus OB association, the nearest such co-moving association of massive stars to the Sun.

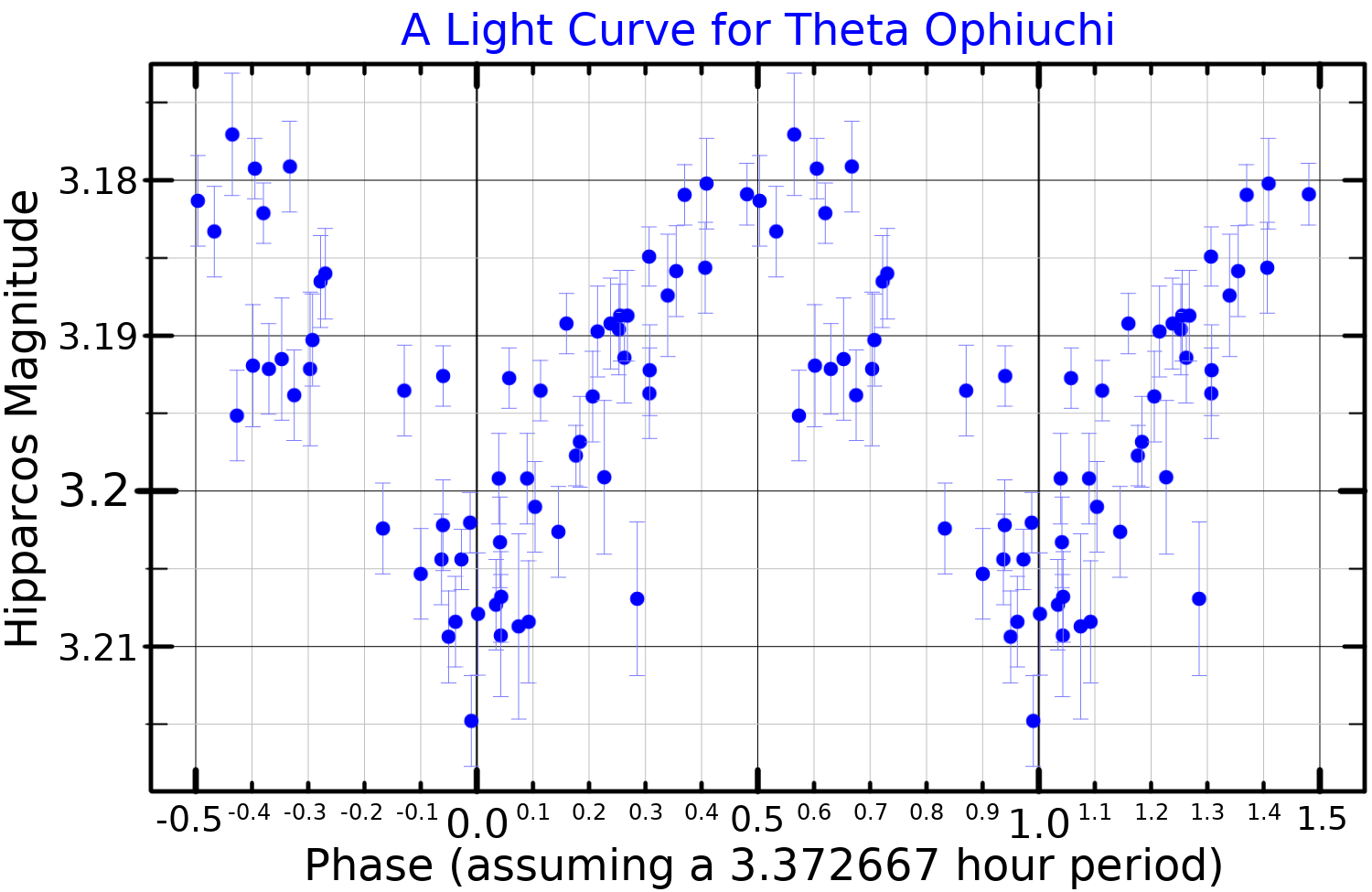
A light curve for Theta Ophiuchi, plotted from Hipparcos data

The primary component of this system is a variable star of the Beta Cephei type with a period of just 3h 22m. It has an estimated 8.6 times the mass of the Sun and 5.1 times the Sun's radius. Although only 21 million years old, it has begun to evolve away from the main sequence and has become a subgiant star with a stellar classification of B2 IV. This massive star is radiating between 4,740 and 6,230 times the luminosity of the Sun from its photosphere at an effective temperature of about 22,260 K, giving it the blue-white hue of a B-type star.

According to Richard H. Allen's Star Names: Their Lore and Meaning (1899), θ Oph together with ξ Oph formed the Sogdian Wajrik "the Magician", the Khorasmian Markhashik "the Serpent-bitten" and with η Oph the Coptic Tshiō, "the Snake", and Aggia, "the Magician". With ζ Oph, η Oph, and ξ Oph it formed the Persian Garafsa, the Serpent-tamer; a 1971 NASA list of star names includes the name Garafsa for θ Oph.
