= Leo Ring =

Intergalactic cloud at the center of the Leo group

Interstellar cloud
- Intergalactic cloud
- H I region
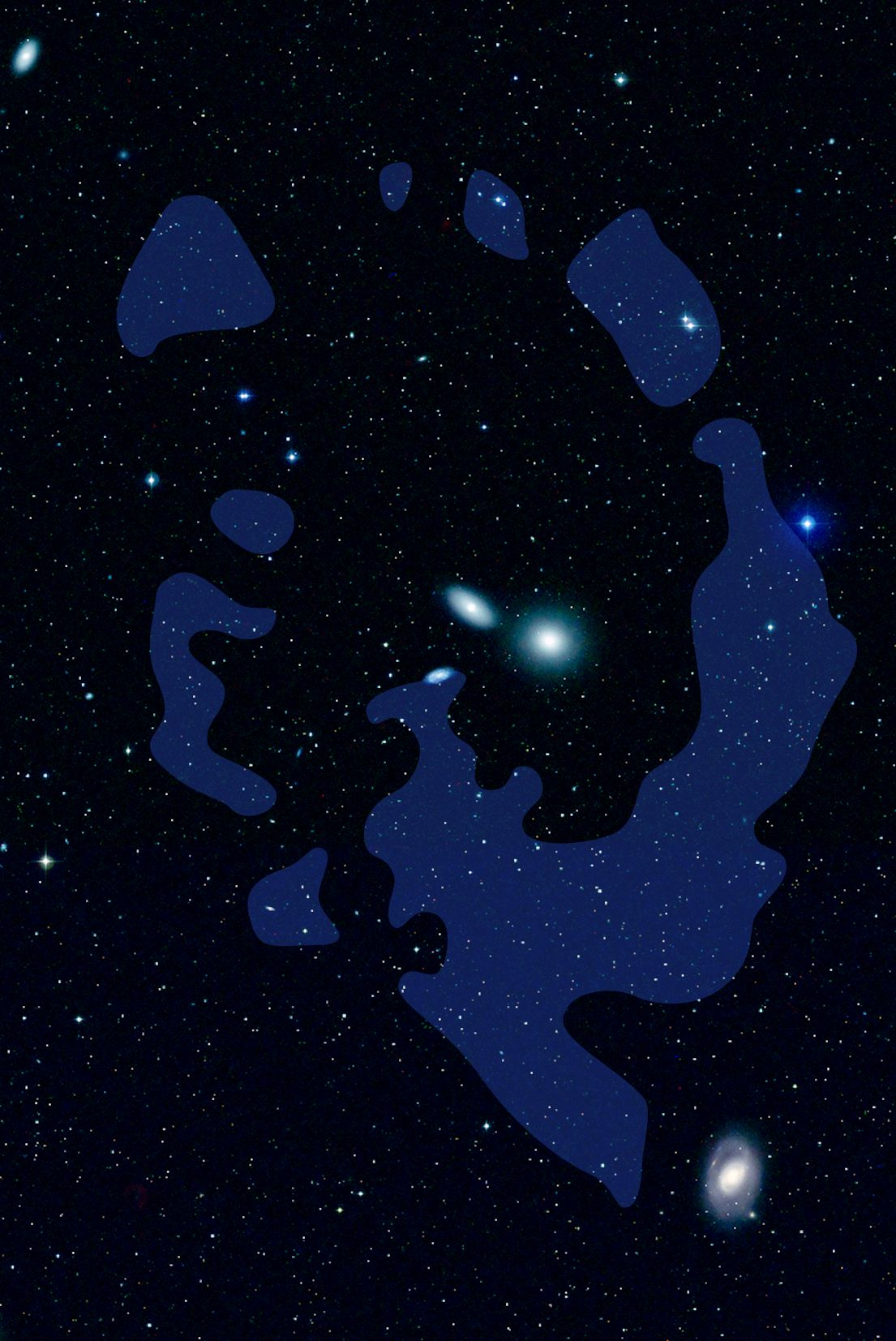
- Chart of the Leo ring in a GALEX image surrounding M105 and NGC 3384

Observation data: J2000.0 epoch
- Right ascension: 10^{h} 48^{m} 19.0^{s}
- Declination: +12° 41′ 21″
- Distance: 38±4.6×10^{6} ly (11.8±1.4×10^{6} pc)
- Constellation: Leo

Physical characteristics
- Radius: 325×10^{3} ly (100×10^{3} pc)

The Leo Ring is an immense intergalactic cloud of hydrogen and helium gas some 650 kilolight-years (200 kpc) in diameter, in orbit of two galaxies, in the center of the Leo Group of galaxies, within the constellation of Leo.

== Observation history ==
Radio astronomers discovered the cloud in 1983. Astronomers had theorized that the ring was primordial gas in the process of forming a galaxy. The GALEX satellite detected ultraviolet emissions that astronomers at Johns Hopkins University and the Carnegie Institution for Science interpret to indicate star creation in newly forming dwarf galaxies in a 19 February 2009 Nature paper. In 2010, it was suggested that the gas was not primordial, but instead the result of a galactic collision between the two galaxies with which the ring is closely associated.

In 2021, analysis of several dense areas revealed several H II regions, powered by massive stars, a few which are O-type stars.

== Formation history ==
It has been suggested that 1.2 billion years ago, NGC 3384 collided with M96, at the heart of the Leo Group, expelling a galaxy's worth of gas into intergalactic space. This gas gathered into a vast set of clouds, the Leo Ring.

The ring is now 650 kilolight-years (200 kpc) wide. The ring is composed of a collection of H I regions. A bridge of gas connects the ring to M96.
