= NGC 3377A =

Galaxy in the constellation Leo

- HST image of UGC 5889

Observation data (J2000 epoch)
- Constellation: Leo
- Right ascension: 10^{h} 47^{m} 22.401^{s}
- Declination: +14° 04′ 16.697″
- Heliocentric radial velocity: 573 km/s
- Distance: 25.2 Mly (7.73 Mpc)
- Group or cluster: M96 Group
- Apparent magnitude (V): 13.7
- Apparent magnitude (B): 14.3

Characteristics
- Type: SAB(s)m
- Mass: 2.3×10^{8} M_{☉}
- Apparent size (V): 2.2′ × 2.1′
- Notable features: Spiral morphology

Other designations
- NGC 3377A, UGC 5889, LEDA 32226, PGC 32226, DDO 88, ZWG 66.14

NGC 3377A is a dwarf irregular galaxy in the equatorial constellation of Leo. Alternatively, it is identified as DDO 88 or UGC 5889. The distance to this galaxy is 25.2 million light-years (7.73 Mpc). The earliest known reference to this galaxy is from the 1959 publication A Catalogue of Dwarf Galaxies by Canadian astronomer Sidney van den Bergh, where it is listed as DDO 88. Therefore, this galaxy, despite its common name, was not a part of the original New General Catalogue.

== Observations ==
This very low surface brightness galaxy is being viewed nearly face-on. It is a typical dwarf irregular galaxy with a morphological class of SAB(s)m. The galaxy is small and faint, with a somewhat boxy shape that is probably hosting a stellar bar. It is gas rich with an extended envelope of neutral hydrogen. Several holes have been identified in this gas, with the largest spanning 2 kpc. The latter radius is half that of the optical galaxy, and it is surrounded by a large ring of enhanced neutral hydrogen emission. The outer morphology of NGC 3377A is similar to a dwarf spiral galaxy with loosely wound arms.

Star formation in NGC 3377A is low, occurring at an averate rate of 0.0033 M_{☉} per year. Over the last 200 million years, star formation appears to have occurred in spurts. NGC 3377A is currently in the midst of one such outburst, with new stars being formed in small, bright, evenly distributed regions in the outer parts of the galaxy. A total of 83 young stellar groups have been identified. Many of these occur in "knots" of hydrogen-alpha emission. The central region primarily consists of older stellar populations.

NGC 3377 and NGC 3377A imaged by Legacy Surveys

NGC 3377A is a member of the M96 Group (Leo I) of galaxies and is located at an angular separation of 7′ to the northwest of the giant elliptical galaxy NGC 3377.

NGC 3377A may be a companion of NGC 3377. The pair have a velocity difference of 120 km s^{−1} and a projected separation of around 72 kly (22 kpc). NGC 3377A has a low rotation rate for its luminosity, suggesting this a tidal dwarf with a lower level of dark matter than is typical.
