= NGC 3384 =

Galaxy in the constellation Leo

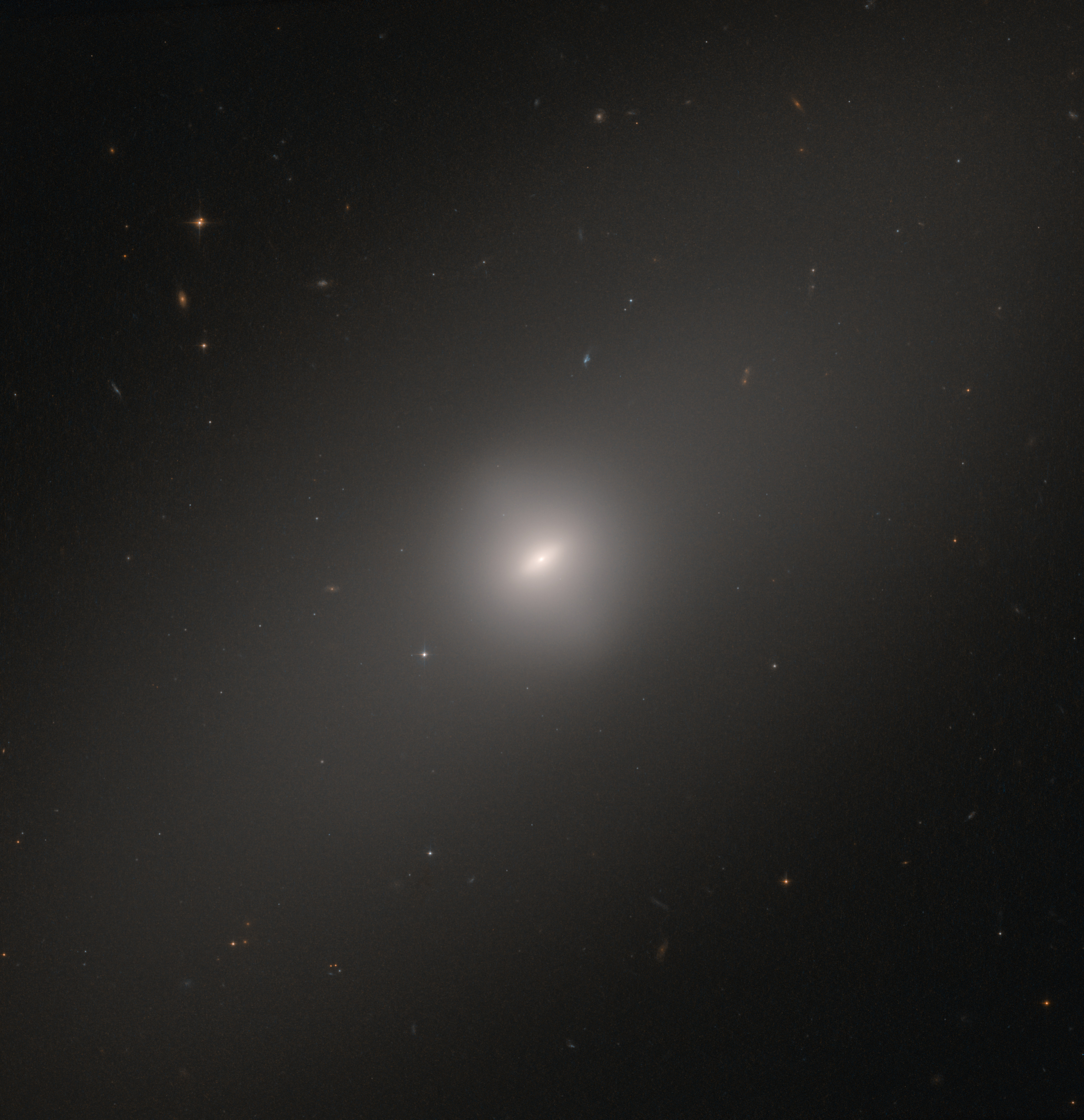
- NGC 3384 taken by Hubble.

Observation data (J2000 epoch)
- Constellation: Leo
- Right ascension: 10^{h} 48^{m} 16.9^{s}
- Declination: +12° 37′ 46″
- Redshift: 704±2 km/s
- Distance: 35.1 ± 2.3 Mly (10.8 ± 0.7 Mpc)
- Apparent magnitude (V): 9.9

Characteristics
- Type: E7
- Apparent size (V): 5.4′ × 2.7′

Other designations
- NGC 3371, UGC 5911, PGC 32292

NGC 3384 is an elliptical galaxy in the constellation Leo. The galaxy was discovered by William Herschel in 1784 as part of the Herschel 400 Catalogue. The high age of the stars in the central region of NGC 3384 was confirmed after analysis of their color. More than 80% were found to be Population II stars which are over a billion years old. The supermassive black hole at the core has a mass of 1.6+0.1
−0.2×10^{7} M_{☉}.

== Galaxy group information ==
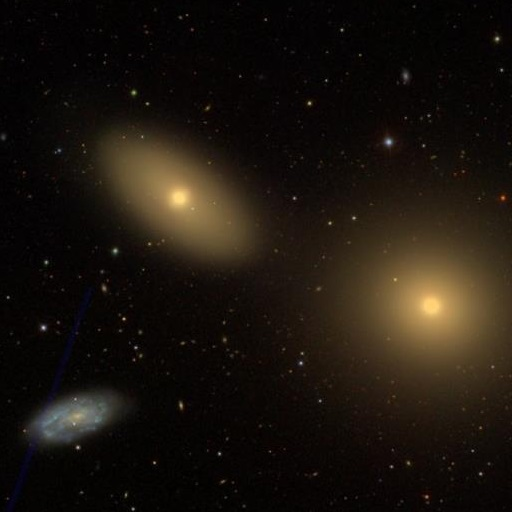
SDSS image of NGC 3384 in upper left with M105 (mid right), and NGC 3389 (lower left)

NGC 3384 is a member of the M96 Group, a group of galaxies in the constellation Leo that is sometimes referred to as the Leo I Group. This group also includes the Messier objects M95, M96, and M105. All of these objects are conspicuously close to each other in the sky.
