= C/1785 A1 (Messier–Méchain) =

Parabolic comet

Discovery
- Discovered by: Charles Messier; Pierre Méchain
- Discovery site: Paris, France
- Discovery date: 7 January 1785

Designations
- Alternative designations: 1785 I

Orbital characteristics
- Epoch: 27 January 1785 (JD 2373045.325)
- Observation arc: 32 days
- Number of observations: 9
- Perihelion: 1.143 AU
- Eccentricity: ~1.000
- Inclination: 70.238°
- Longitude of ascending node: 267.21°
- Argument of periapsis: 205.63°
- Last perihelion: 27 January 1785

Physical characteristics
- Apparent magnitude: 7.5 (1785 apparition)

Comet Messier–Méchain, also known as C/1785 A1 from its modern nomenclature, is a faint parabolic comet that was observed several times by French astronomers, Charles Messier and Pierre Méchain, in January 1785.

== Discovery and observations ==
Charles Messier discovered this comet using a small refractor following an observation of Uranus on the night of 7 January 1785. Approximately 40 minutes later, Pierre Méchain also discovered the same comet from the Paris Observatory. At the time, the comet was located within the constellation Cetus. (Note: Reported initial positions upon discovery were: α = 2^{h} 09^{m} 14.5^{s}, δ = 4° 16′ 32″ (Messier) and α = 2^{h} 09^{m} 14.9^{s}, δ = 4° 15′ 42″ (Méchain) respectively.)

Messier described the comet as a faint object surrounded by a "central condensation" around it, where he also noted that it became brighter on 9 January than it was two days earlier, but it never became visible to the naked eye. He continued to observe the comet until 17 January 1785, when it was no longer visible near the star ε Cet.

== Orbit ==
The only known orbital calculations of the comet were written by Méchain in 1788, where he determined a parabolic trajectory that indicated the comet had reached perihelion on 27 January, while making its closest approach to Earth a day later at a distance of 0.417 AU (62.4 million km)

In 2012, Maik Meyer noted that the preliminary orbital calculations for the comet C/2012 L2 (LINEAR) were strikingly similar to that of Messier–Méchain, however he concluded that this is only a coincidence rather than a return of C/1785 A1 itself.
