= NGC 3377 =

Galaxy in the constellation Leo

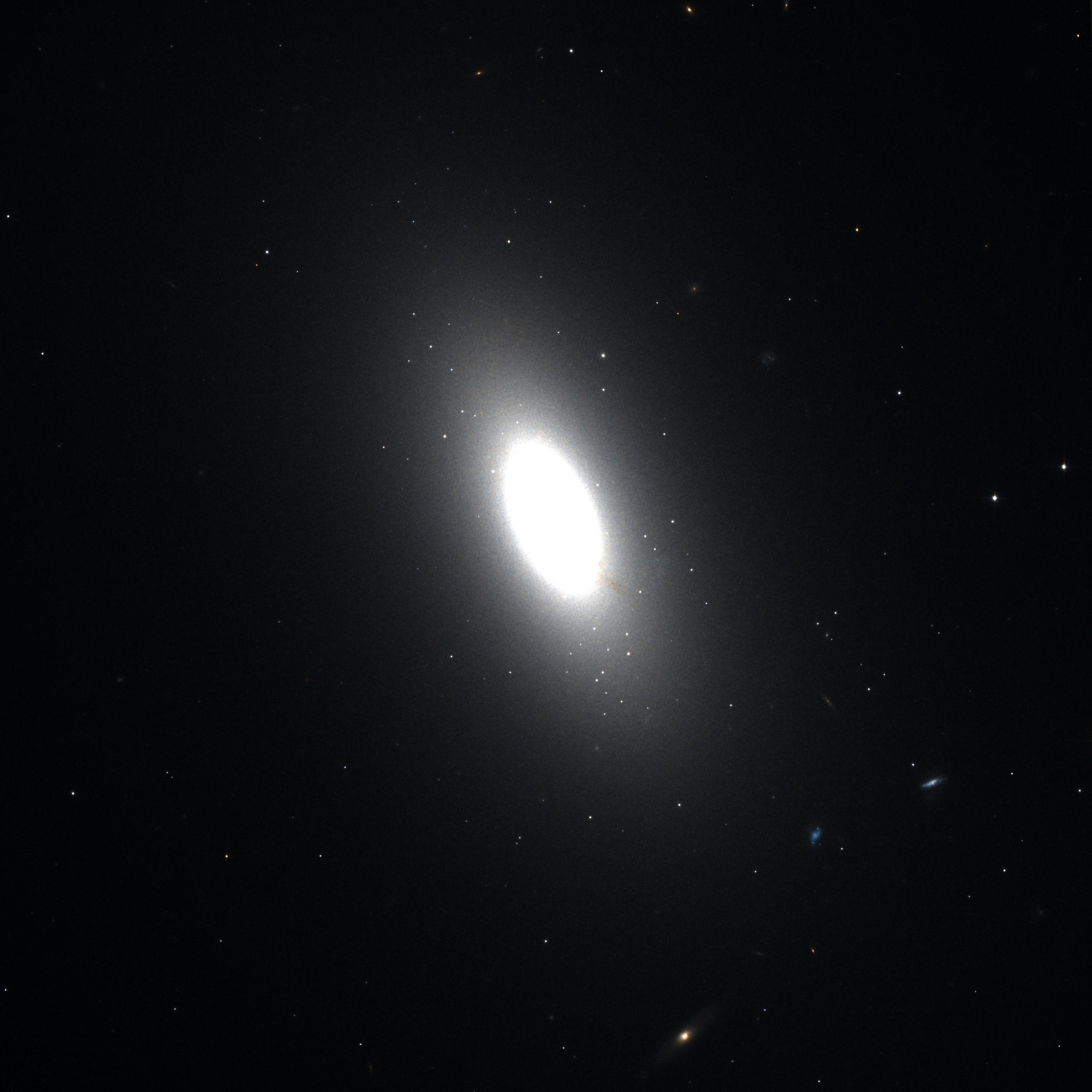
- Hubble Space Telescope image of NGC 3377

Observation data (J2000 epoch)
- Constellation: Leo
- Right ascension: 10^{h} 47^{m} 42.40^{s}
- Declination: +13° 59′ 08.3″
- Redshift: 0.002218±0.000008
- Distance: 37 Mly (11.2 Mpc)
- Apparent magnitude (V): 10.2

Characteristics
- Type: E5–6
- Apparent size (V): 5.2′ × 3.0′

Other designations
- NGC 3377, UGC 5899, PGC 32249

NGC 3377 is an elliptical galaxy of intermediate luminosity in the equatorial constellation of Leo. It was discovered on April 8, 1784 by German-British astronomer William Herschel. This galaxy has an apparent visual magnitude of 10.2 with an angular size of 5.2′ × 3.0′. It is located at a distance of 37 million light-years (11.2 Mpc) and has a diameter of approximately 40,000 ly. NGC 3377 is a member of the M96 Group of galaxies. A very faint companion galaxy, NGC 3377A, is at an angular separation of 7.1′ to the northwest.

The morphological classification of NGC 3377 is E5–6, indicating an elliptical galaxy with an elongated shape. The velocity distribution shows a sharp rise within an arcsecond of the core, demonstrating the presence of a supermassive black hole. This object has an estimated mass of 8.0+0.5
−0.6×10^{7} M_{☉}. The galactic halo has a virial mass estimated at (3.6±0.6)×10^{11} M_{☉}. It has a system of globular clusters with an estimated 400–500 members.

== Gallery ==
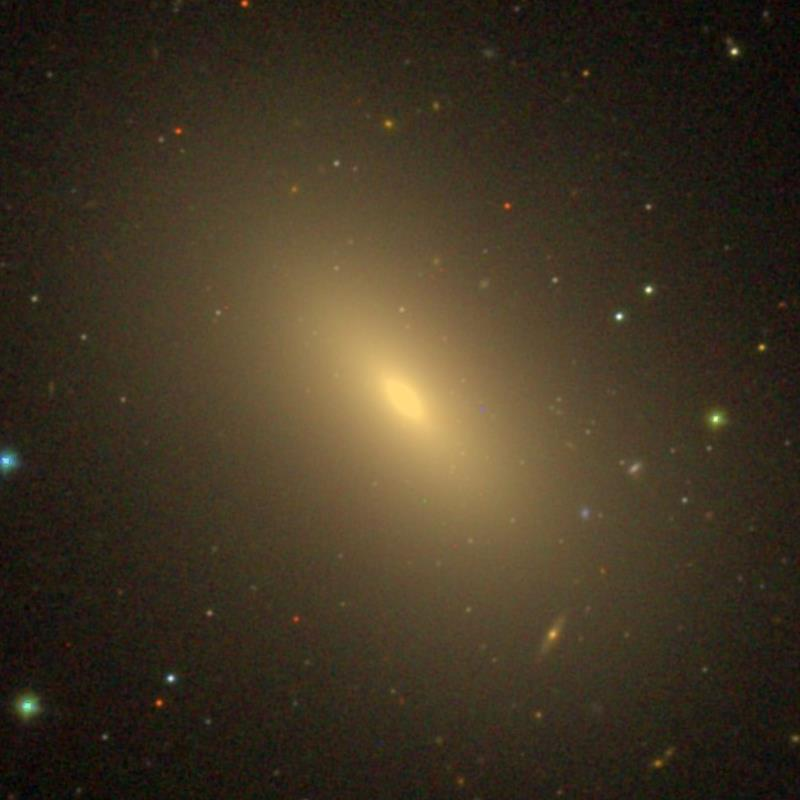
SDSS image of NGC 3377

NGC 3377 and NGC 3377A imaged by Legacy Surveys
