= C/2012 L2 (LINEAR) =

Non-periodic comet

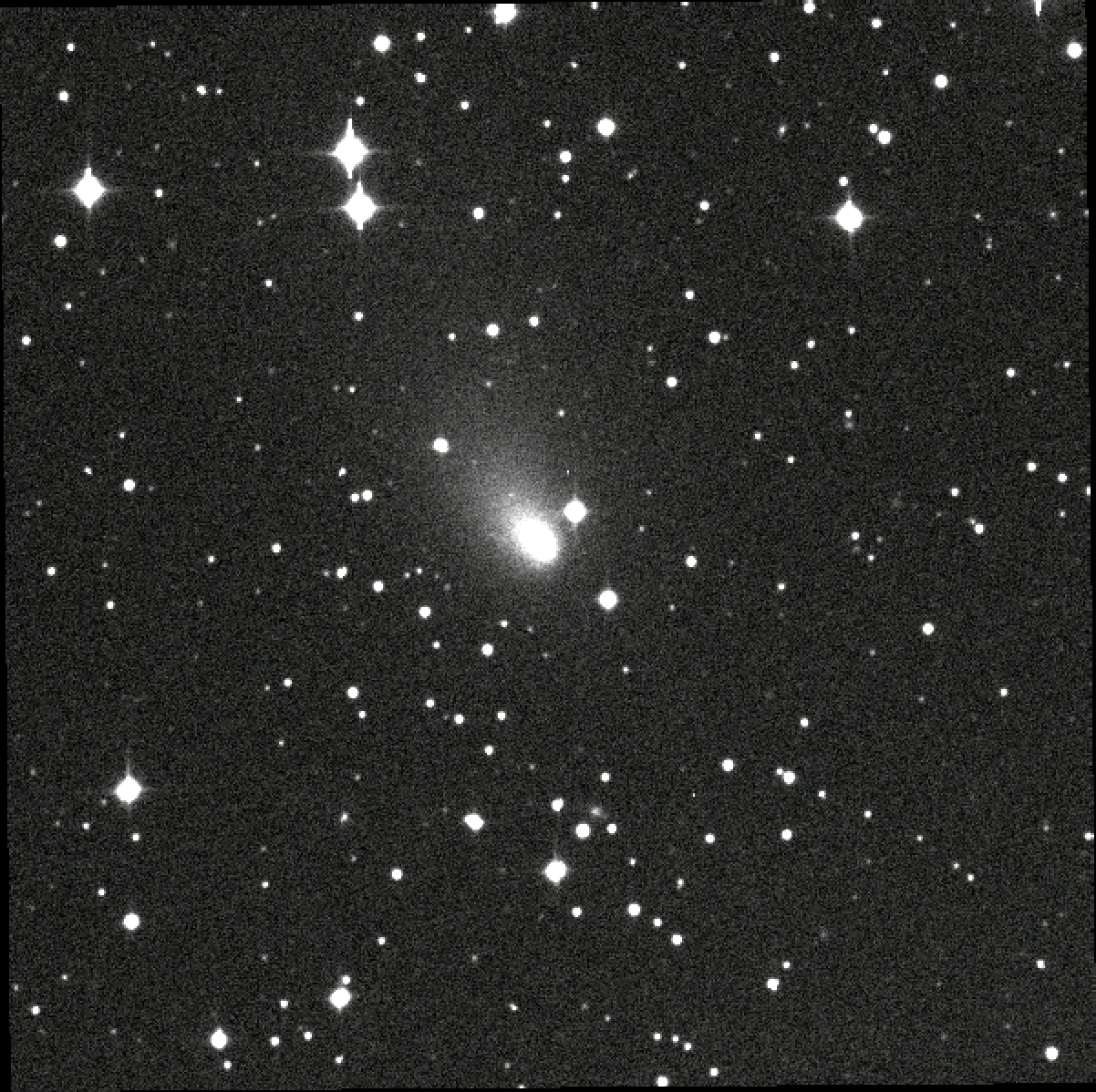
- The comet on 18 February 2013 by the Palomar Transient Factory

Discovery
- Discovered by: LINEAR
- Discovery site: Socorro, New Mexico
- Discovery date: 1 June 2012

Designations
- Alternative designations: CK12L020

Orbital characteristics
- Observation arc: 338 days
- Number of observations: 2,119
- Aphelion: ~1,130 AU
- Perihelion: 1.509 AU
- Semi-major axis: 565.74 AU
- Eccentricity: 0.99733
- Orbital period: ~13,460 years
- Inclination: 70.981°
- Longitude of ascending node: 270.302°
- Argument of periapsis: 205.786°
- Last perihelion: 9 May 2013
- T_{Jupiter}: 0.505
- Earth MOID: 0.584 AU
- Jupiter MOID: 3.248 AU

Physical characteristics
- Comet total magnitude (M1): 11.3
- Apparent magnitude: 10.0 (2013 apparition

C/2012 L2 (LINEAR) is a non-periodic comet that was discovered on 1 June 2012 by LINEAR. Preliminary calculations of its orbit by Maik Meyer noted a striking similarity with that of C/1785 A1 (Messier–Mechain), however it is purely a coincidence rather than the return of the latter comet. It passed perihelion in May 2013.

== Discovery and observations ==
The comet was discovered as a 19.4-magnitude object from photographs taken by the Lincoln Near-Earth Asteroid Research survey on the morning of 1 June 2012. Five days after discovery, Maik Meyer noted that the preliminary orbit of this comet was initially similar to that of C/1785 A1, however he later concluded that these comets were unrelated from one another. Its aphelion distance suggested it may have been a dynamically new object that originated from the inner regions of the Oort cloud, therefore imaging polarimetry of the comet was conducted to further study the composition of these objects.
