= M96 Group =

Galaxy group in the constellation Leo

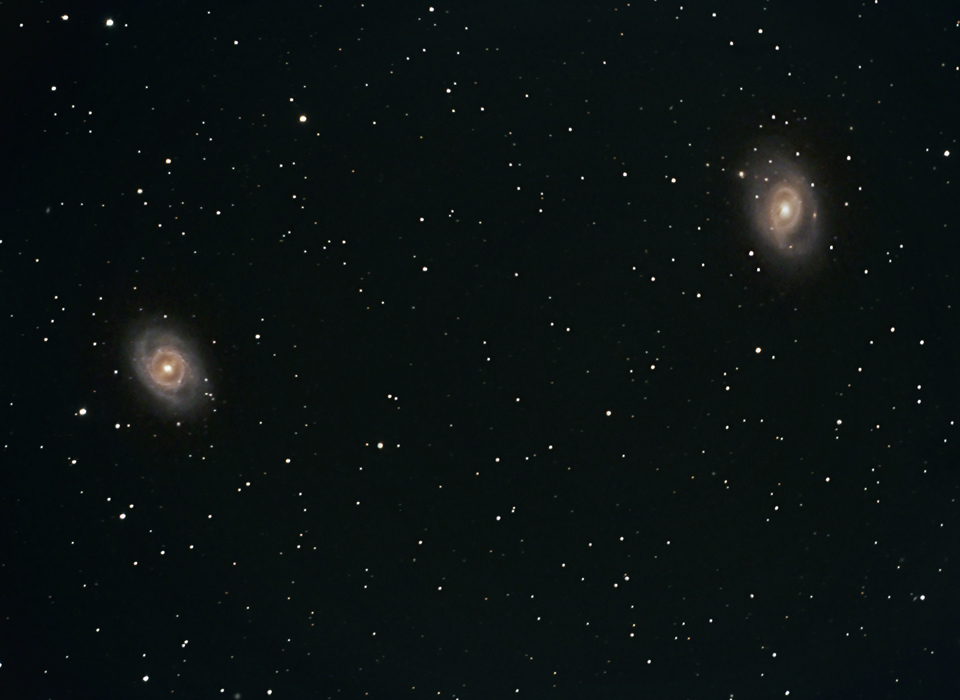
- M95 (left) and M96 (right). Credit:Scott Anttila.

Observation data (Epoch J2000)
- Constellation: Leo
- Right ascension: 10^{h} 48^{m} 34.7^{s}
- Declination: +12° 40′ 15″
- Brightest member: M96
- Number of galaxies: 8-24
- Distance: 11.3 Mpc (37 Mly)

Other designations
- Leo I Group, LGG 217, NOGG H 507, NOGG P1 498, NOGG P2 507

The M96 Group (also known as the Leo I Group) is a group of galaxies in the constellation Leo. This group contains between 8 and 24 galaxies, including three Messier objects. It also contains the Leo Ring. The group is one of many groups that lies within the Virgo Supercluster (the combined Local Group and Virgo Cluster).

== Members ==
The table below lists galaxies that have been consistently identified as group members in the Nearby Galaxies Catalog, the survey of Fouque et al., the Lyons Groups of Galaxies (LGG) Catalog, and the three group lists created from the Nearby Optical Galaxy sample of Giuricin et al.

Members of the M96 Group
Name	Type	R.A. (J2000)	Dec. (J2000)	Redshift (km/s)	Apparent Magnitude
M95	SB(r)b	10^{h} 43^{m} 57.7^{s}	+11° 42′ 14″	778 ± 4	11.4
M96	SAB(rs)ab	10^{h} 46^{m} 45.7^{s}	+11° 49′ 12″	897 ± 4	10.1
M105	E1	10^{h} 47^{m} 49.6^{s}	+12° 34′ 54″	911 ± 2	10.2
NGC 3299	SAB(s)dm	10^{h} 36^{m} 23.8^{s}	+12° 42′ 27″	641 ± 6	13.3
NGC 3377	E5.5	10^{h} 47^{m} 42.4^{s}	+13° 59′ 08″	665 ± 2	11.2
NGC 3384	E7	10^{h} 48^{m} 16.9^{s}	+12° 37′ 46″	704 ± 2	10.9
NGC 3412	SB(s)0	10^{h} 50^{m} 53.3^{s}	+13° 24′ 44″	841 ± 2	11.5
NGC 3489	SAB(rs)0	11^{h} 00^{m} 18.6^{s}	+13° 54′ 04″	677 ± 2	11.1
Leo Ring	H I region	10^{h} 48^{m} 19.0^{s}	+12° 41′ 21″	960 ± 80	

== Nearby groups ==
The Leo Triplet, which includes the spiral galaxies M65, M66, and NGC 3628, is located physically near the M96 Group. Some group identification algorithms actually identify the Leo Triplet at part of the M96 Group. The two groups may actually be separate parts of a much larger group.

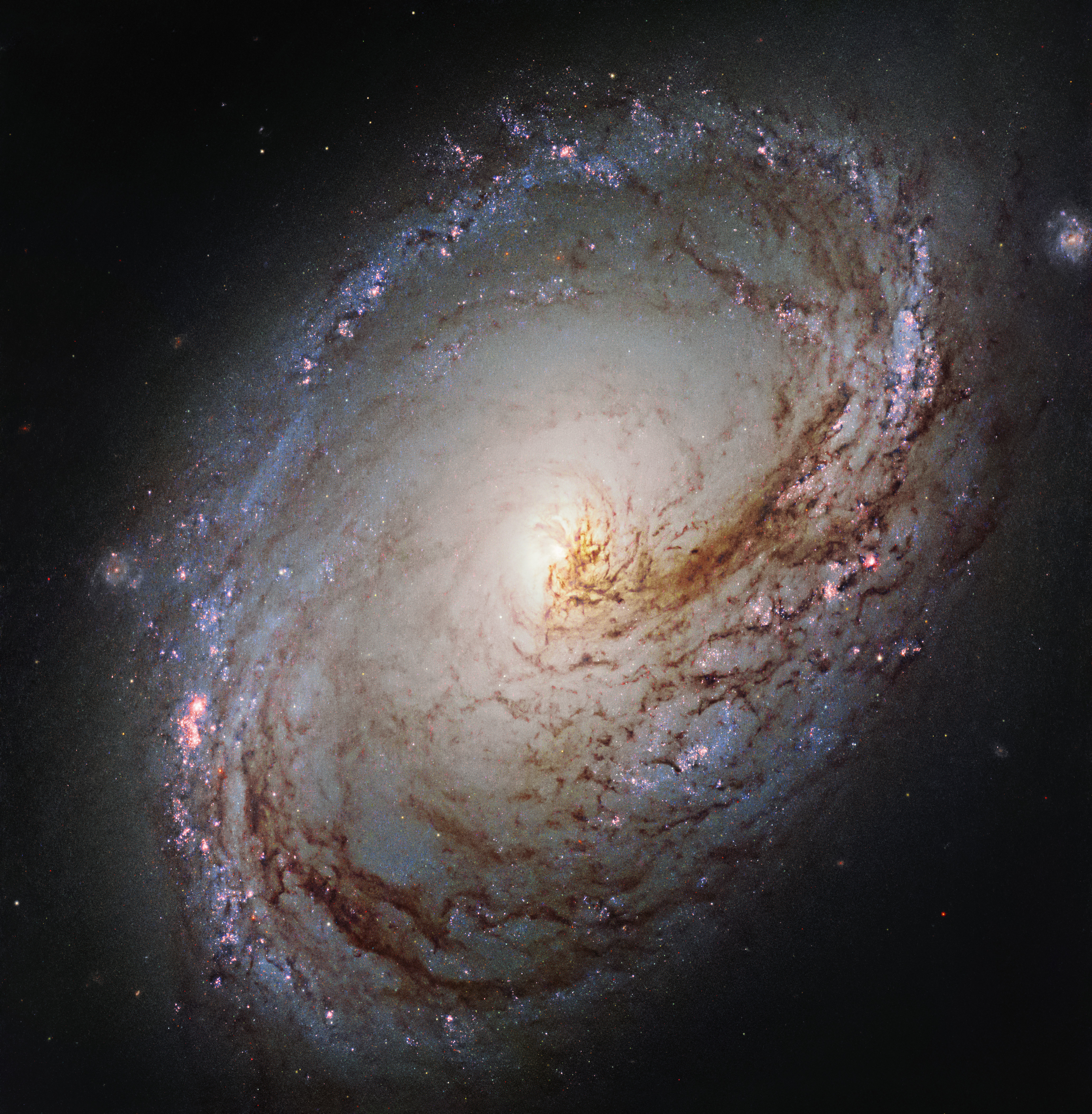
M96 Group also includes the bright galaxies Messier 105 and Messier 95.

== See also ==
- Leo II Groups
- Virgo II Groups
- Virgo III Groups
