= Pierre Méchain =

French mathematician and astronomer (1744–1804)

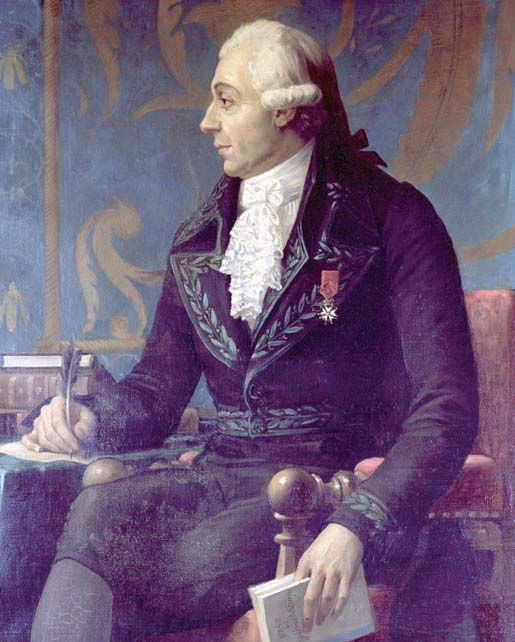
- Portrait of Méchain, c. 1882
- Born: Pierre François André Méchain; 16 August 1744; Laon, France
- Died: 20 September 1804 (aged 60); Castellón de la Plana, Spain
- Known for: Deep-sky objects comets metre
- Scientific career
- Fields: astronomy
- Workplaces: Paris Observatory

Signature
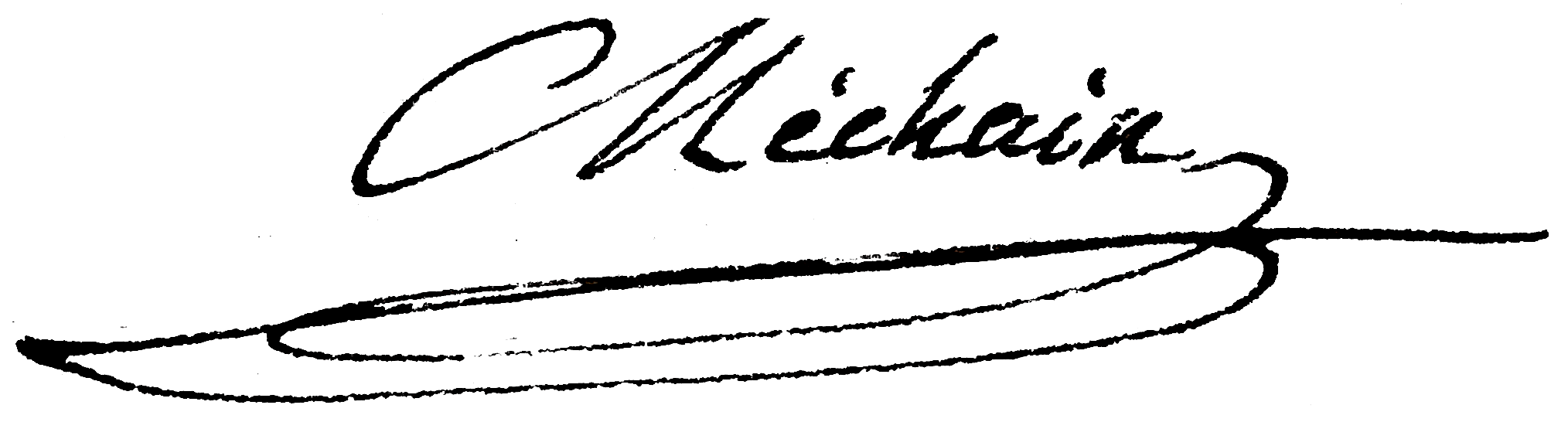

Pierre François André Méchain (French pronunciation: [pjɛʁ fʁɑ̃swa ɑ̃dʁe meʃɛ̃]; 16 August 1744 – 20 September 1804) was a French astronomer and surveyor who, with Charles Messier, was a major contributor to the early study of deep-sky objects and comets.

== Life ==
Pierre Méchain was born in Laon in northern France, the son of the ceiling designer and plasterer Pierre François Méchain and Marie–Marguerite Roze. He displayed mental gifts in mathematics and physics but had to give up his studies for lack of money. However, his talents in astronomy were noticed by Jérôme Lalande, for whom he became a friend and proof-reader of the second edition of his book "L'Astronomie". Lalande then secured a position for him as assistant hydrographer with the Naval Depot of Maps and Charts at Versailles, where he worked through the 1770s engaged in hydrographic work and coastline surveying. It was during this time—approximately 1774—that he met Charles Messier, and apparently, they became friends. In the same year, he also produced his first astronomical work, a paper on an occultation of Aldebaran by the Moon, and presented it as a memoir to the Academy of Sciences.

In 1777, Méchain married Barbe-Thérèse Marjou whom he knew from his work in Versailles. They had two sons: Jérôme, born 1780, and Augustin, born 1784, and one daughter. He was admitted to the French Académie des sciences in 1782, and was the editor of Connaissance des Temps from 1785 to 1792; this was the journal which, among other things, first published the list of Messier objects. In 1789 he was elected a Fellow of the Royal Society.

Méchain participated in the Anglo-French Survey (1784–1790) to measure by trigonometry the precise distance between the Paris Observatory and the Royal Greenwich Observatory. This project had been initiated by César-François Cassini de Thury, who died in 1784, and in 1787 Méchain visited Dover and London with Cassini de Thury’s son Dominique, comte de Cassini and Adrien-Marie Legendre to facilitate its progress. The three men also visited the astronomer William Herschel at Slough, who had discovered Uranus in 1781.

With his surveying skills, Méchain worked on maps of Northern Italy and Germany after this, but his most important mapping work was geodetic: the determination of the southern part of the meridian arc of the Earth's surface between Dunkirk and Barcelona beginning in 1791. This measurement would become the basis of the metric system's unit of length, the meter. He encountered numerous difficulties on this project, largely stemming from the effects of the French Revolution. He was arrested after it was suspected his instruments were weapons, he was interned in Barcelona after war broke out between France and Spain, and his property in Paris was confiscated during The Terror. He was released from Spain to live in Italy, then returned home in 1795.

A particularly intriguing fact about this project was that Méchain was uncertain of the precision of his measurements owing to anomalous results in verifying his latitude by astronomical observation. Ultimately, the distance from the pole to the equator, which Méchain and his associate Jean Baptiste Joseph Delambre had intended to be exactly ten million meters (or ten thousand kilometres), was determined in the late 20th century by space satellites to be 10,002,290 metres. This small error of 2,290 metres equals 1.423 statute miles; the error in such a large measurement amounts to 14½ inches per statute mile. It represents in each metre an error of approximately 0.23 millimetres – slightly more than the width of a single strand of human hair. This discrepancy is sometimes mentioned as "Méchain's error", with the suggestion that the tiny variation in the length of the meridian (not detected for nearly two hundred years) can be attributed to Méchain's calculations. But analysis of Méchain's figures reveals that Méchain consistently kept the discrepancy very tiny, essentially forcing his individual reported measurements to appear more precise and consistent than would be reasonably expected of a survey involving more than a hundred measurements of mostly rough country using 18th-century equipment; Méchain's putative error did not affect the final value of the length of the metre nor the measurement of the meridian.

From 1799, Méchain was the director of the Paris Observatory.

Continuing doubts about his measurements of the Dunkirk-Barcelona arc led him to return to that work. This took him back to Spain in 1804, where he caught yellow fever and died in Castellón de la Plana.

== Discoveries ==
Méchain discovered either 25 or 26 deep-sky objects, depending on how one counts M102. Méchain disavowed the M102 observation in 1783, claiming it was a mistaken re-observation of M101. Since that time, others have proposed that he did in fact observe another object, and suggested what they might be.

Open cluster Globular cluster Nebula Planetary nebula Supernova remnant Galaxy Other

Messier number	NGC/IC Number	Common name	Date of Discovery	Object type	Distance (kly)	Constellation	Apparent magnitude
M63	NGC 5055	Sunflower Galaxy	14 June 1779	Galaxy, spiral	37,000	Canes Venatici	8.5
M72	NGC 6981		30 August 1780	Cluster, globular	53	Aquarius	10.0
M74	NGC 628		Sep 1780	Galaxy, spiral	35,000	Pisces	10.5
M75	NGC 6864		27 August 1780	Cluster, globular	58	Sagittarius	9.5
M76	NGC 650, NGC 651	Little Dumbbell Nebula	5 September 1780	Nebula, planetary	3.4	Perseus	10.1
M77	NGC 1068	Cetus A	29 October 1780	Galaxy, spiral	60,000	Cetus	10.5
M78	NGC 2068		Begin 1780	Nebula, diffuse	1.6	Orion	8.0
M79	NGC 1904		26 October 1780	Cluster, globular	40	Lepus	8.5
M85	NGC 4382		4 March 1781	Galaxy, lenticular	60,000	Coma Berenices	10.5
M94	NGC 4736		22 March 1781	Galaxy, spiral	14,500	Canes Venatici	9.5
M95	NGC 3351		20 March 1781	Galaxy, barred spiral	38,000	Leo	11.0
M96	NGC 3368		20 March 1781	Galaxy, spiral	38,000	Leo	10.5
M97	NGC 3587	Owl Nebula	16 February 1781	Nebula, planetary	2.6	Ursa Major	9.9
M98	NGC 4192		15 March 1781	Galaxy, spiral	60,000	Coma Berenices	11.0
M99	NGC 4254		15 March 1781	Galaxy, spiral	60,000	Coma Berenices	10.5
M100	NGC 4321		15 March 1781	Galaxy, spiral	60,000	Coma Berenices	10.5
M101	NGC 5457	Pinwheel Galaxy	27 March 1781	Galaxy, spiral	27,000	Ursa Major	7.9
M102	(Not conclusively identified)						
M103	NGC 581		Mar–Apr 1781	Cluster, open	8	Cassiopeia	7.0

He independently discovered four others, originally discovered by someone else but unknown to him at the time and included in the Messier catalogue: M71, discovered by Jean-Philippe de Chéseaux in the 1740s; M80, discovered by Messier about two weeks earlier than Méchain's observation; and M81 and M82, discovered originally by Johann Bode.

Six other discoveries are "honorary Messier objects" added to the list in the 20th century:

Messier number	NGC/IC Number	Common name	Date of Discovery	Object type	Distance (kly)	Constellation	Apparent magnitude
M104	NGC 4594	Sombrero Galaxy	11 May 1781	Galaxy, spiral	50,000	Virgo	9.5
M105	NGC 3379		24 March 1781	Galaxy, elliptical	38,000	Leo	11.0
M106	NGC 4258		Jul 1781	Galaxy, spiral	25,000	Canes Venatici	9.5
M107	NGC 6171			Cluster, globular	20	Ophiuchus	10.0
M108	NGC 3556		19 February 1781	Galaxy, barred spiral	45,000	Ursa Major	11.0
M109	NGC 3992		12 March 1781	Galaxy, barred spiral	55,000	Ursa Major	11.0

He also discovered NGC 5195, the companion galaxy that makes M51 (the Whirlpool Galaxy) so distinctive.

Méchain never set out to observe deep-sky objects. Like Messier, he was solely interested in cataloguing objects that might be mistaken for comets; having done so, he was the second-most successful discoverer of comets of his time, after Messier himself.

All together, he originally discovered eight comets, and co-discovered three.

His sole discoveries are:

- C/1781 M1 (Méchain), 1781 I
- C/1781 T1 (Méchain), 1781 II
- C/1785 E1 (Méchain), 1785 II
- 2P/Encke, discovered in 1786
- C/1787 G1 (Méchain), 1787 I
- 8P/Tuttle, discovered in 1790
- C/1799 P1 (Méchain), 1799 II
- C/1799 Y1 (Méchain), 1799 III

Méchain's co-discoveries are:

- C/1785 A1 (Messier-Méchain), 1785 I
- C/1792 II Gregory-Méchain, 1792 II
- C/1801 Pons (Pons-Messier-Méchain-Bouvard), 1801 I

Note that only the two named comets have been connected to periodic comets that have computed orbits and in neither case was he an observer when they were computed, so by that technical definition (commonly used for comets since the 19th century) Méchain did not discover any of these nine.

== Legacy ==
On 24 June 2002, Asteroid 21785 Méchain was named in his honour, discovered by Miloš Tichý at Kleť Observatory on 21 September 1999, and provisionally designated 1999 SS2.

== See also ==
- History of the metre
- Messier object
- List of Messier objects
- Messier marathon
- Seconds pendulum
- Meridian arc of Delambre and Méchain
