= NGC 3489 =

Galaxy in the constellation Leo

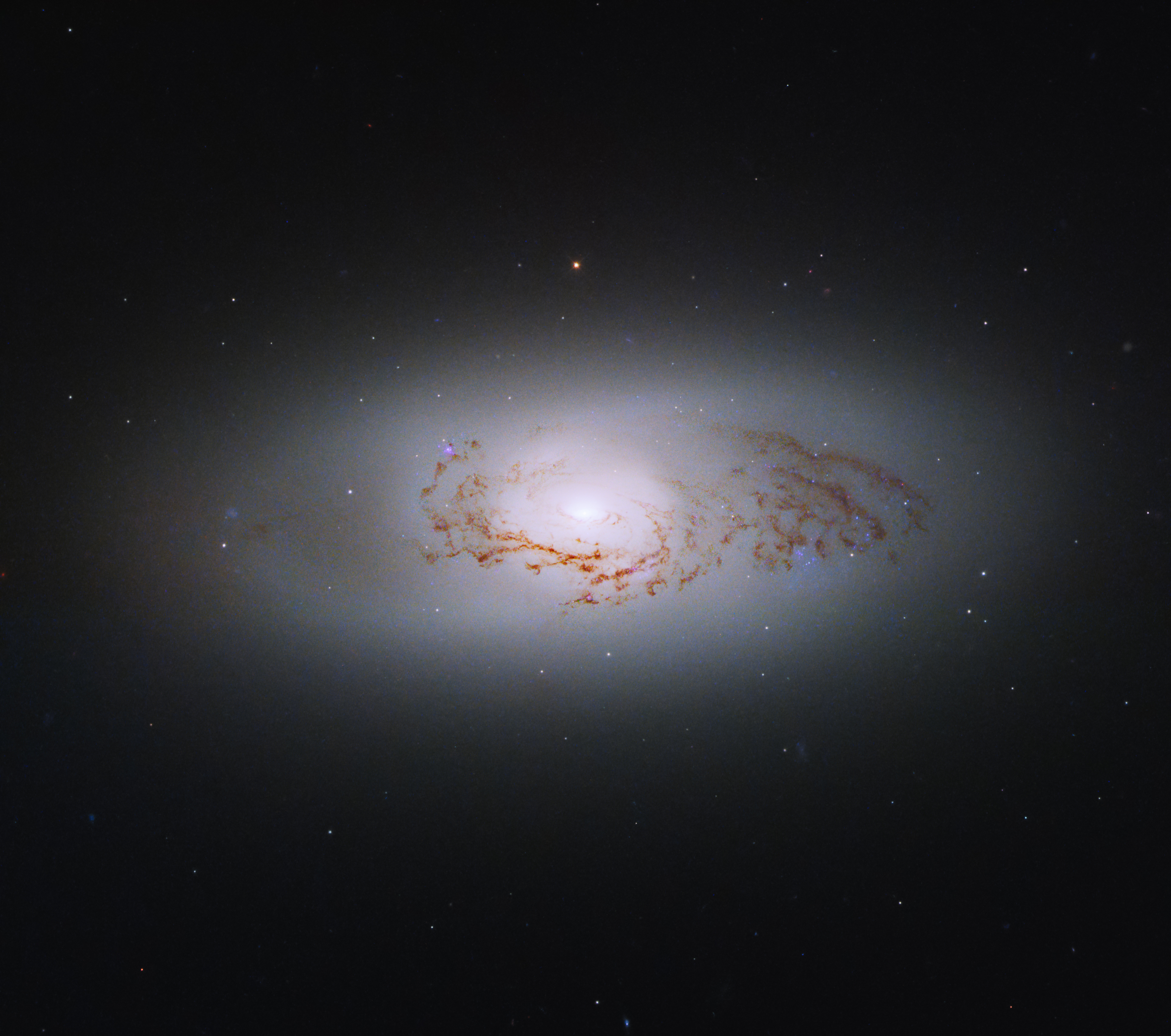
- NGC 3489 imaged by the Hubble Space Telescope

Observation data (J2000 epoch)
- Constellation: Leo
- Right ascension: 11^{h} 00^{m} 18.6^{s}
- Declination: +13° 54′ 04″
- Redshift: 0.002258±0.000006
- Heliocentric radial velocity: 677±2 km/s
- Distance: 29 ± 8.4 Mly (8.9 ± 2.6 Mpc)
- Apparent magnitude (V): 10.2

Characteristics
- Type: SAB(rs)0+
- Apparent size (V): 3.5′ × 2.0′

Other designations
- NGC 3489, UGC 6082, MCG +02-28-039, PGC 33160, CGCG 066-084

NGC 3489 is a lenticular galaxy located in the constellation Leo. It is located at a distance of about 30 million light years from Earth, which, given its apparent dimensions, means that NGC 3489 is about 30,000 light years across. It was discovered by William Herschel on April 8, 1784. NGC 3489 is a member of the Leo Group.

NGC 3489 has a weak bar, seen along the minor axis, and a small bulge. The age of the stellar population in NGC 3489 shows a gradient, with the younger stars lying closer to the core. When observed in H-beta, the central arcsecond of NGC 3489 shows a peak, indicating the presence of younger stars at the core, whose age is estimated to be about 1.7 Gys. Although currently NGC 3489 is considered a post-starburst galaxy, there is still molecular gas in the nucleus that can lead to star formation, although its mass is less than what is found in galaxies with active star formation. In the nuclear region of NGC 3489 has been observed dust with an open spiral pattern. The galaxy has an outer ring structure, with a diameter of 1.54 arcminutes along the major axis.

NGC 3489 has an active galactic nucleus, which has been categorised based on its spectrum as a type 2 Seyfert galaxy or, based on the nuclear [O I] emission strength, which lies between that of H II nuclei and LINER, a transition object. This kind of transition emission could be attributed to post AGB stars located in the core. A supermassive black hole which accretes material in the centre of the galaxy is believed to be the cause of nuclear activity. In the centre of NGC 3489 lies a black hole with estimated mass (6±0.54)×10^{6} M_{☉} based on velocity dispersion.

== Gallery ==
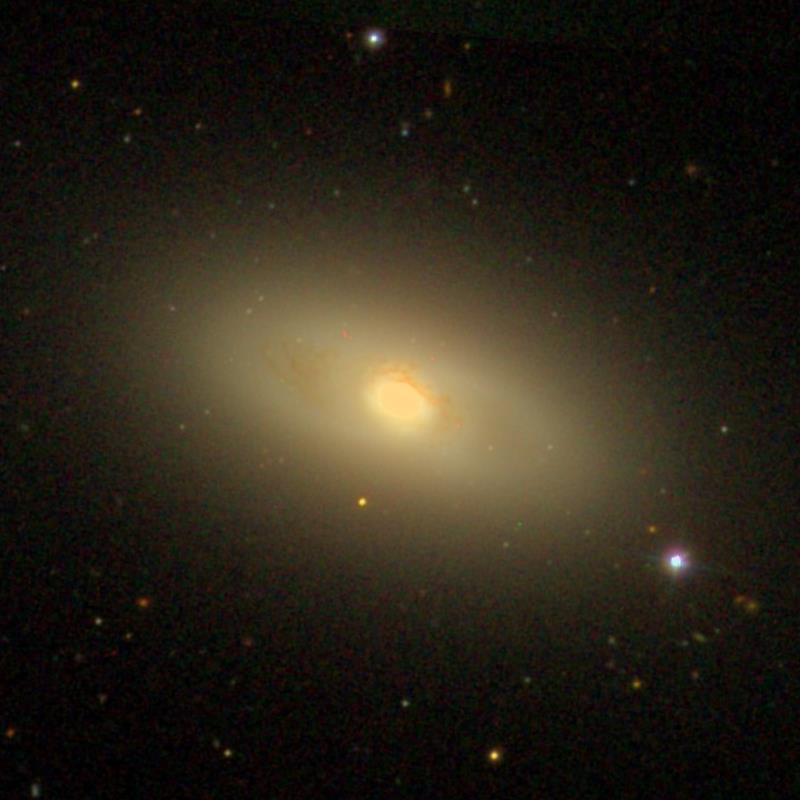
NGC 3489 (SDSS DR14)

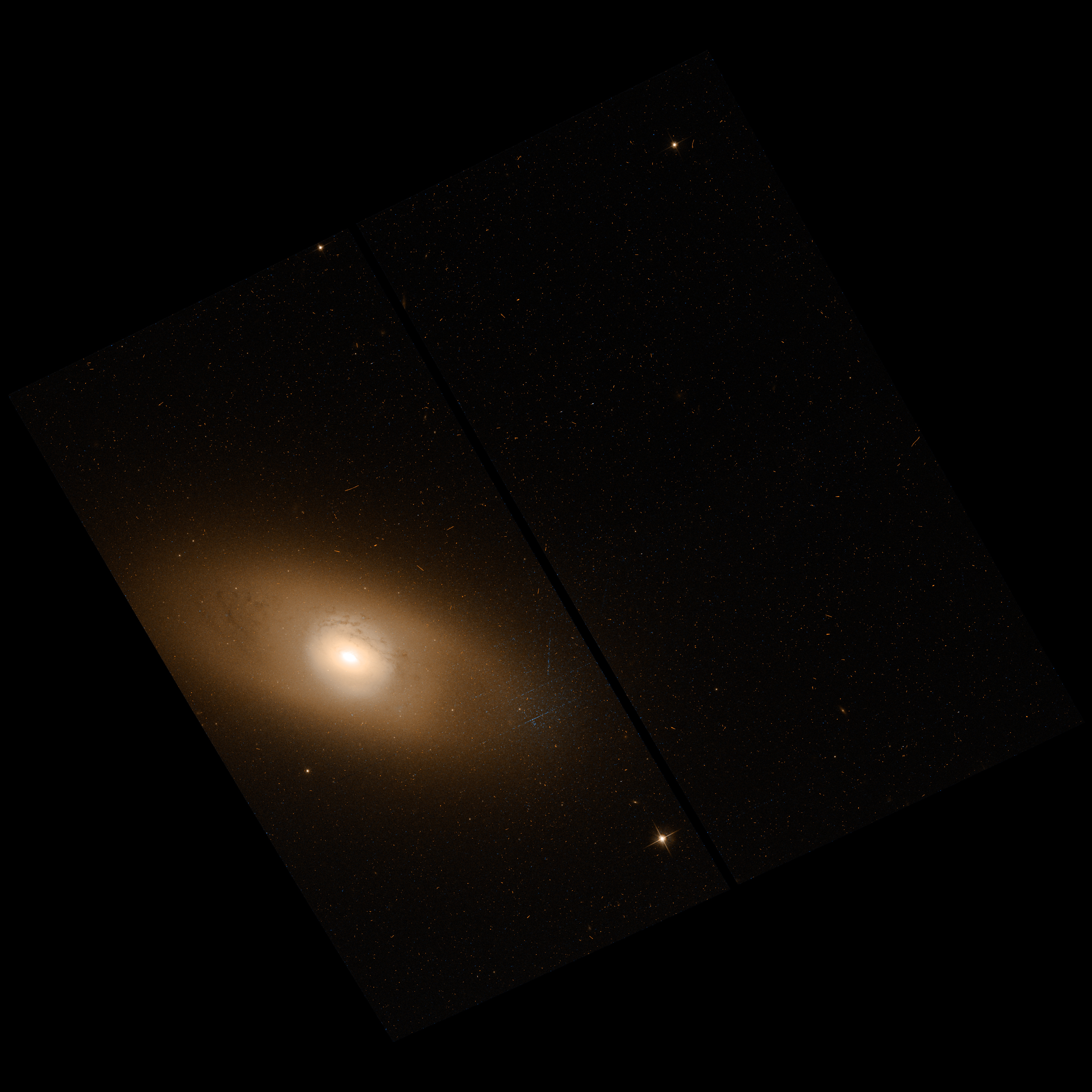
NGC 3489 imaged by the Hubble Space Telescope
