= Messier 105 =

Elliptical galaxy in the constellation Leo

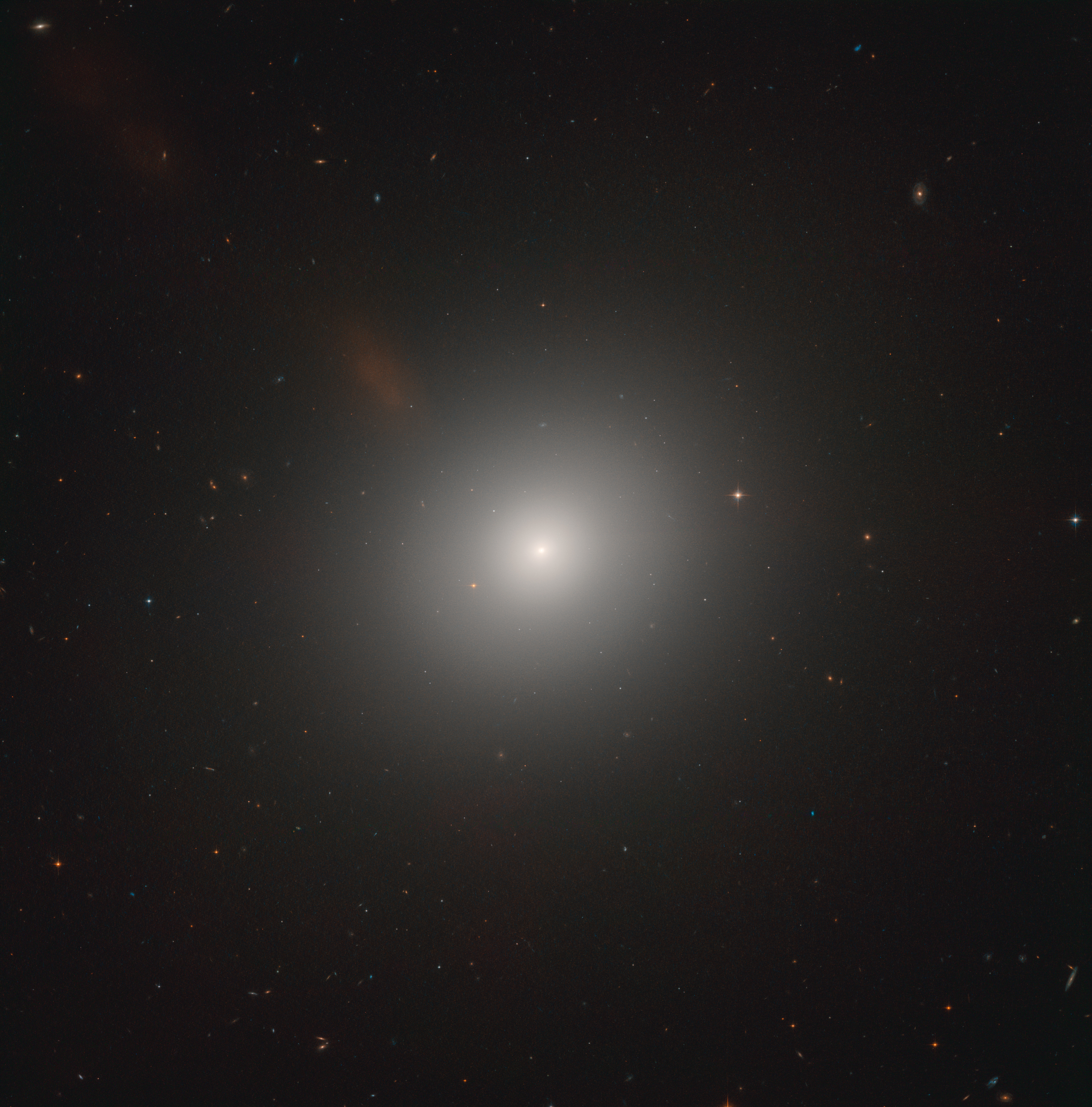
- M105 imaged by the Hubble Space Telescope; Credit: NASA/ESA

Observation data (J2000 epoch)
- Constellation: Leo
- Right ascension: 10^{h} 47^{m} 49.600^{s}
- Declination: +12° 34′ 53.87″
- Redshift: 0.003026±0.00000734
- Heliocentric radial velocity: 908 km/s
- Distance: 36.6 Mly (11.22 Mpc)
- Group or cluster: Leo I Group
- Apparent magnitude (V): 9.3

Characteristics
- Type: E1
- Size: ~67,100 ly (20.57 kpc) (estimated)
- Apparent size (V): 5.4′ × 4.8′

Other designations
- M105, HOLM 212A, NGC 3379, UGC 5902, MCG +02-28-011, PGC 32256, CGCG 066-018

Messier 105 or M105, also known as NGC 3379, is an elliptical galaxy 36.6 million light-years away in the equatorial constellation of Leo. It is the biggest elliptical galaxy in the Messier catalogue that is not in the Virgo cluster. It was discovered by Pierre Méchain in 1781, just a few days after he discovered the nearby galaxies Messier 95 and Messier 96. (Note: Object found: on 24 March) This galaxy is one of a few not object-verified by Messier so omitted in the editions of his Catalogue of his era. It was appended when Helen S. Hogg found a letter by Méchain locating and describing this object which matched those aspects under its first-published name, NGC 3379.

Messier 105 has a morphological classification of E1, indicating a standard elliptical galaxy with a flattening of 10%. The major axis is aligned along a position angle of 71°. Isophotes of the galaxy are near perfect ellipses, twisting no more than 5° out of alignment, with changes in ellipticity of no more than 0.06. There is no fine structure apparent in the isophotes, such as ripples. Observation of giant stars in the halo indicate there are two general populations: a dominant metal-rich subpopulation and a weaker metal-poor group.

Messier 105 is known to have a supermassive black hole at its core whose mass is estimated to be between 1.4×10^{8} and 2×10^{8} M_{☉}. The galaxy has a weak active galactic nucleus of the LINER type with a spectral class of L2/T2, meaning no broad Hα line and intermediate emission line ratios between a LINER and a H II region. The galaxy also contains a few young stars and stellar clusters, suggesting some elliptical galaxies still form new stars, but very slowly.

This galaxy, along with its companion the barred lenticular galaxy NGC 3384, is surrounded by an enormous ring of neutral hydrogen with a radius of 200 kiloparsecs (650 kilolight-years) and a mass of 1.8×10^{9} M_{☉} where star formation has been detected. Messier 105 is one of several galaxies within the M96 Group (also known as the Leo I Group), a group of galaxies in the constellation Leo, the other Messier objects of which are M95 and M96. It is one of the richest group of galaxies in the Local Volume, and unlike the Local Group, it is dominated by not one but several galaxies.

== See also ==
- List of Messier objects
