= Messier 95 =

Galaxy in the constellation Leo

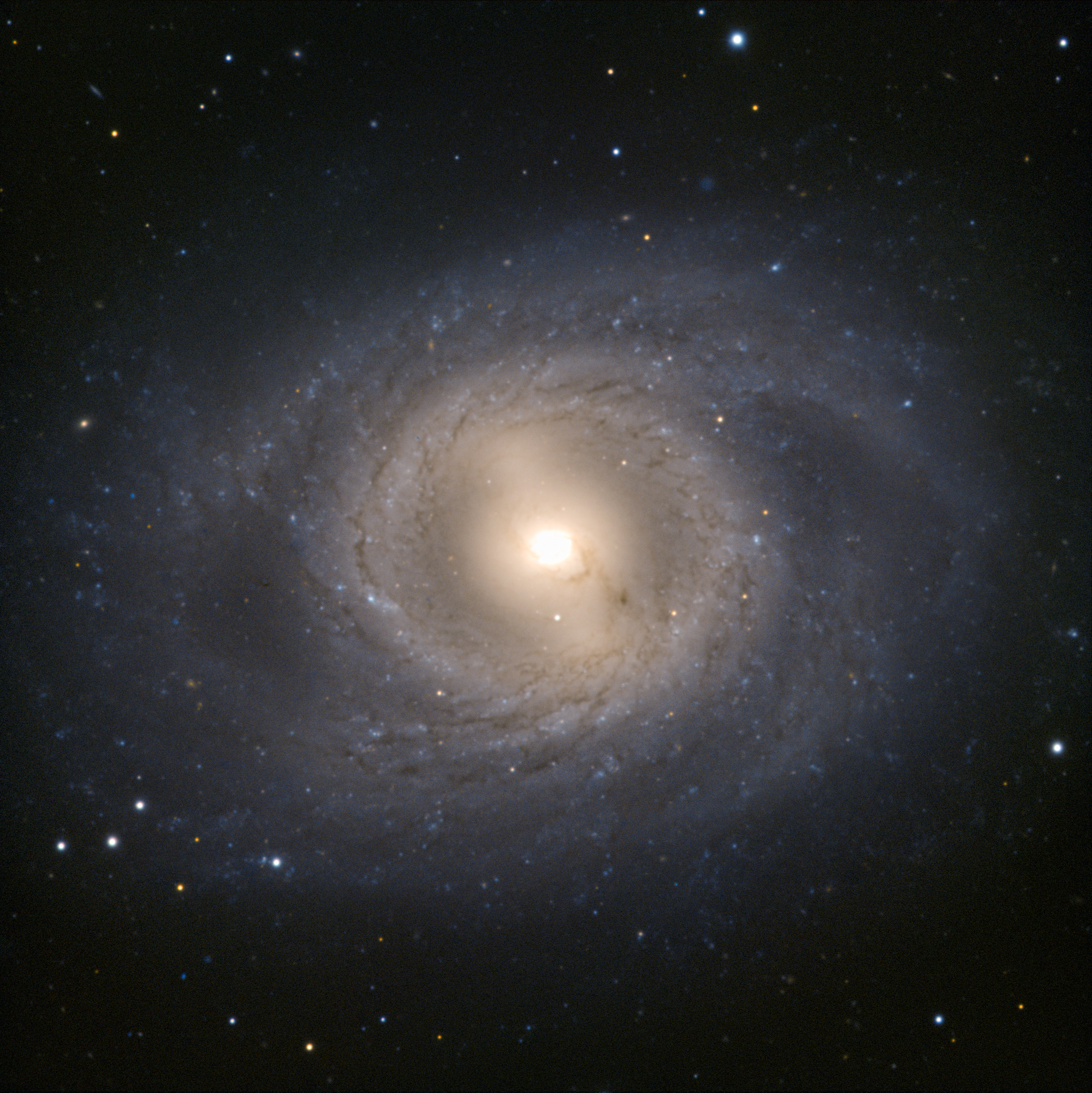
- Very Large Telescope image of Messier 95

Observation data (J2000 epoch)
- Constellation: Leo
- Right ascension: 10^{h} 43^{m} 57.7^{s}
- Declination: +11° 42′ 14″
- Redshift: 778 ± 4 km/s
- Distance: 32.6 ± 1.4 Mly (10.0 ± 0.4 Mpc)
- Apparent magnitude (V): 9.7

Characteristics
- Type: SB(r)b
- Size: 80,130 ly (24.58 kpc)
- Apparent size (V): 3′.1 × 2′.9

Other designations
- NGC 3351, UGC 5850, PGC 32007

Messier 95, also known as M95 or NGC 3351, is a barred spiral galaxy about 33 million light-years away in the zodiac constellation Leo. It was discovered by Pierre Méchain in 1781, and catalogued by compatriot Charles Messier four days later. In 2012 its most recent supernova was discovered.

The galaxy has a morphological classification of SB(r)b, with the SBb notation indicating it is a barred spiral with arms that are intermediate on the scale from tightly to loosely wound, and an "(r)" meaning an inner ring surrounds the bar. The latter is a ring-shaped, circumnuclear star-forming region with a diameter of approximately 70,000 light-years (21,000 pc) and a thickness of around 2,400 light-years (750 pc). The spiral structure extends outward from the ring.

Its ring structure is about 3.5×10^{8} M_{☉} (solar masses) in molecular gas and yields a star formation rate of 0.38 M_{☉} yr^{−1}. (Note: meaning per year) The star formation is occurring in at least five regions with diameters between 100 and 150 pc that are composed of several star clusters ranging in size from 1.7 to 4.9 pc. These individual clusters contain (1.8–8.7)×10^{6} M_{☉} (Note: 1.8 to 8.7 million solar masses) of stars, and may be on the path to forming globular clusters.

M95 is one of several galaxies within the M96 Group, a group of galaxies in the constellation Leo, the other Messier objects of which are M96 and M105.

== Supernova ==
One supernova has been observed in M95:

- SN 2012aw (Type II-P, mag. 15) was discovered by Paolo Fagotti, and independently by Jure Skvarc, on 16 March 2012. The light curve of this displayed great flattening after 27 days, thus classifying it as a Type II-P, or "plateau", core-collapse supernova. The disappearance of the progenitor star was later confirmed from near-infrared imaging of the region. The brightness from the presumed red supergiant progenitor allowed its mass to be estimated as 12.5±1.5 M_{☉}.

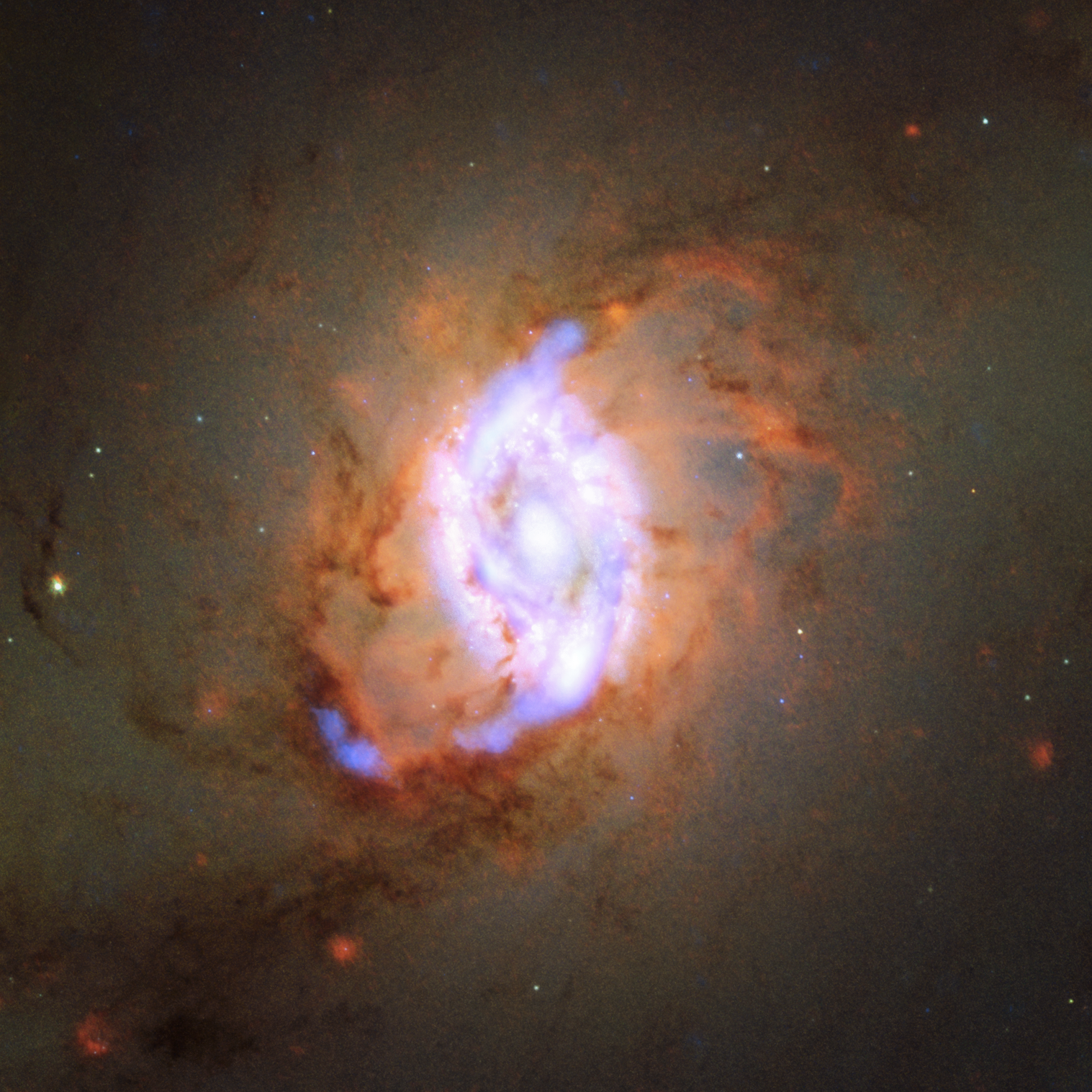
Optical and radio information are combined in this image of M95, showing the process of " stellar feedback", redistributing energy into the interstellar medium causing star-forming (blue area).

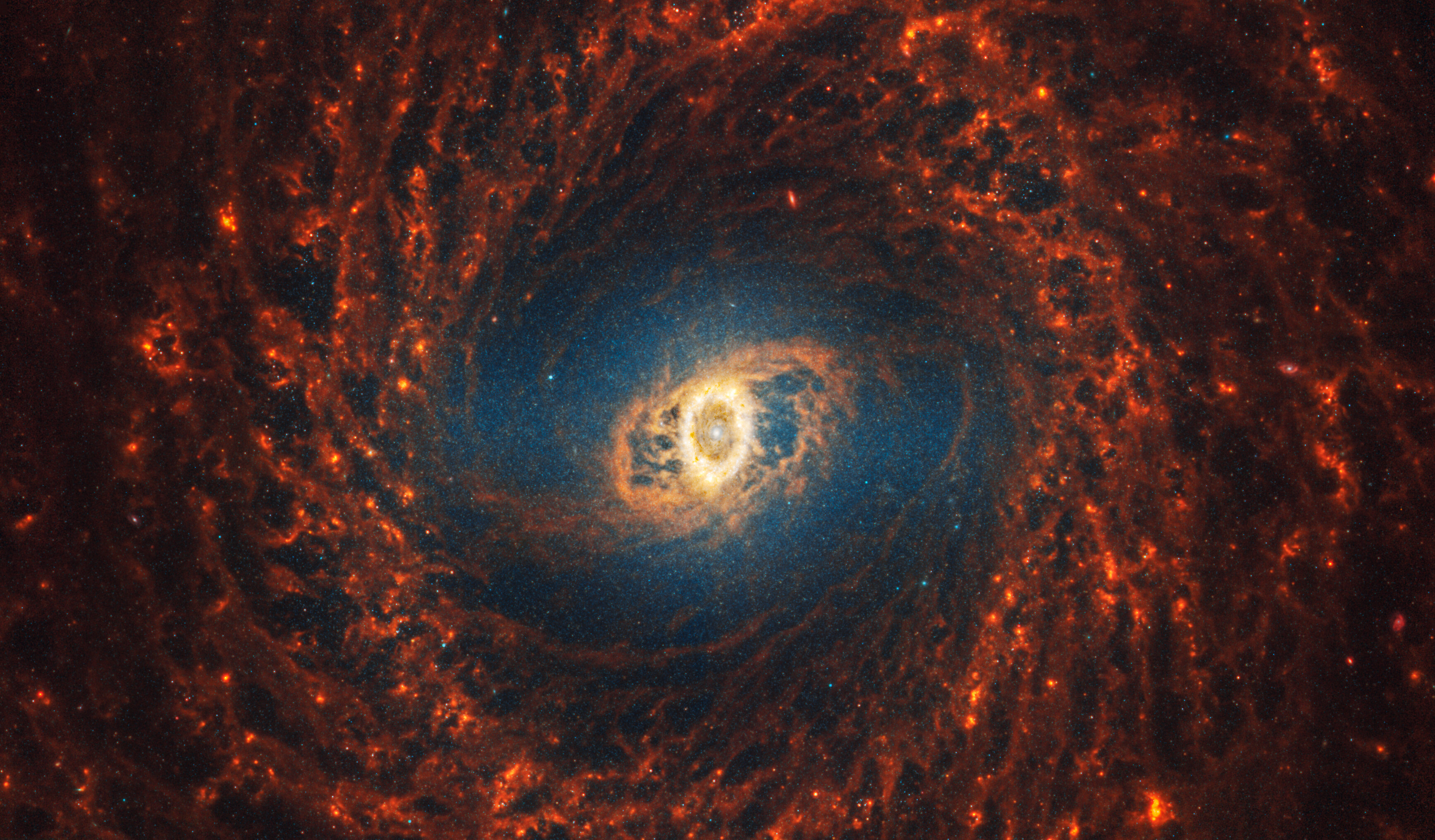
Image of M95 taken by James Webb's MIRI and NIRCam instruments.

== See also ==
- List of Messier objects
