= Messier 96 =

Galaxy in the constellation Leo

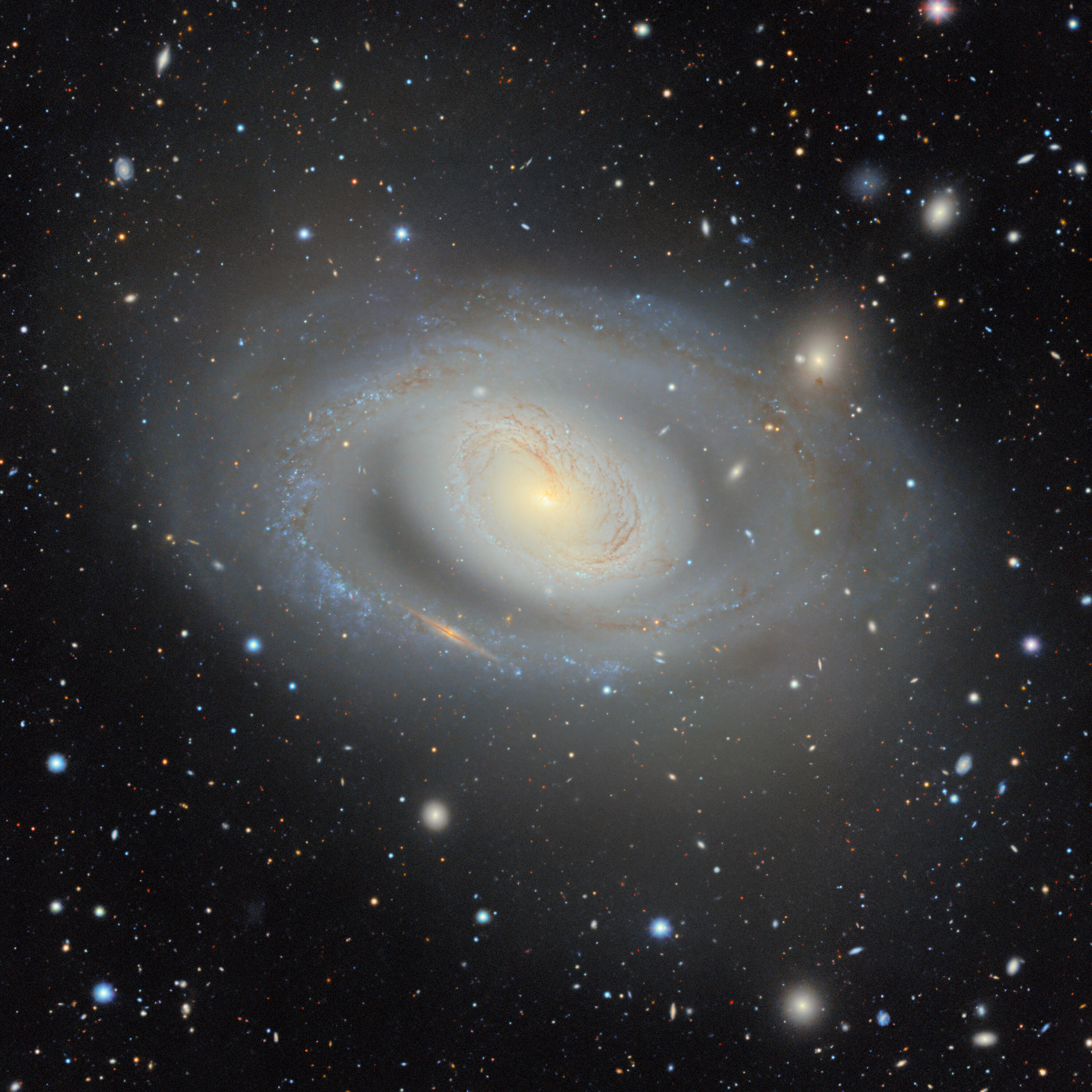
- M96 imaged by DECam on the Víctor M. Blanco Telescope

Observation data (J2000 epoch)
- Constellation: Leo
- Right ascension: 10^{h} 46^{m} 45.6847^{s}
- Declination: +11° 49′ 12.003″
- Redshift: 0.002962±0.000002
- Heliocentric radial velocity: 888±1 km/s
- Distance: 31 ± 3 Mly (9.6 ± 1.0 Mpc)
- Apparent magnitude (V): 9.2

Characteristics
- Type: SAB(rs)ab
- Size: ~78,000 ly (23.93 kpc) (estimated)
- Apparent size (V): 7.6′ × 5.2′

Other designations
- IRAS 10441+1205, NGC 3368, UGC 5882, MCG +02-28-006, PGC 32192, CGCG 066-013

Messier 96 (also known as M96 or NGC 3368) is an intermediate spiral galaxy about 31 million light-years away in the constellation Leo.

== Observational history and appearance ==
M96 was discovered by French astronomer Pierre Méchain on March 20, 1781. After communicating his finding, French astronomer Charles Messier confirmed the finding four days later and added it to his catalogue of nebulous objects.

Finding this object is burdensome with large binoculars. Ideal minimum resolution, in a good sky, is via a telescope of 25.4 cm (10.0 in) aperture, to reveal its three-by-five-arcminute halo with a brighter core region.

This complex galaxy is inclined by an angle of about 53° to the line of sight from the Earth, which is oriented at a position angle of 172°.

== Properties ==
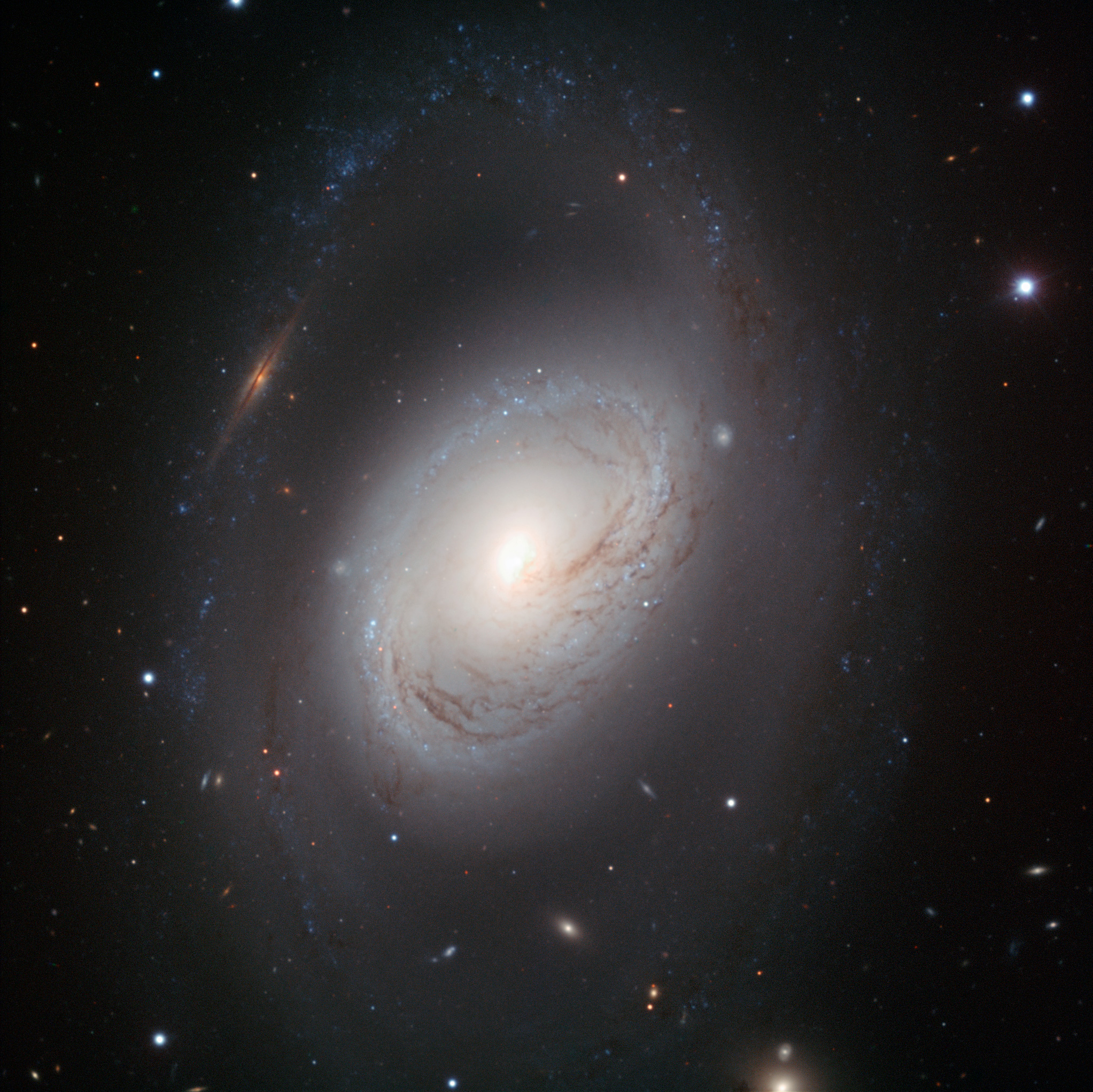
ESO's Very Large Telescope image of Messier 96. It shows its core displaced from the centre, its gas and dust are distributed asymmetrically and its spiral arms are ill-defined.

Messier 96 is categorized as a double-barred spiral galaxy with a small inner bulge through the core along with an outer bulge. The nucleus displays a weak level of activity of the LINER2 type. Variations in ultraviolet emission from the core suggest the presence of a supermassive black hole. Estimates for the mass of this object range from 1.5×10^{6} to 4.8×10^{7} solar masses (M_{☉}).

Messier 96 is about the same mass and size as the Milky Way. It is a very asymmetric galaxy; its dust and gas are unevenly spread throughout its weak spiral arms, and its core is just offset from the midpoint of its extremes. Its arms are also asymmetrical, thought to have been influenced by the gravitational pull of other galaxies within its group.

Messier 96 is being studied as part of a survey of 50 nearby galaxies known as the Legacy ExtraGalactic UV Survey (LEGUS), providing an unprecedented view of star formation within the local universe.

== Supernova ==
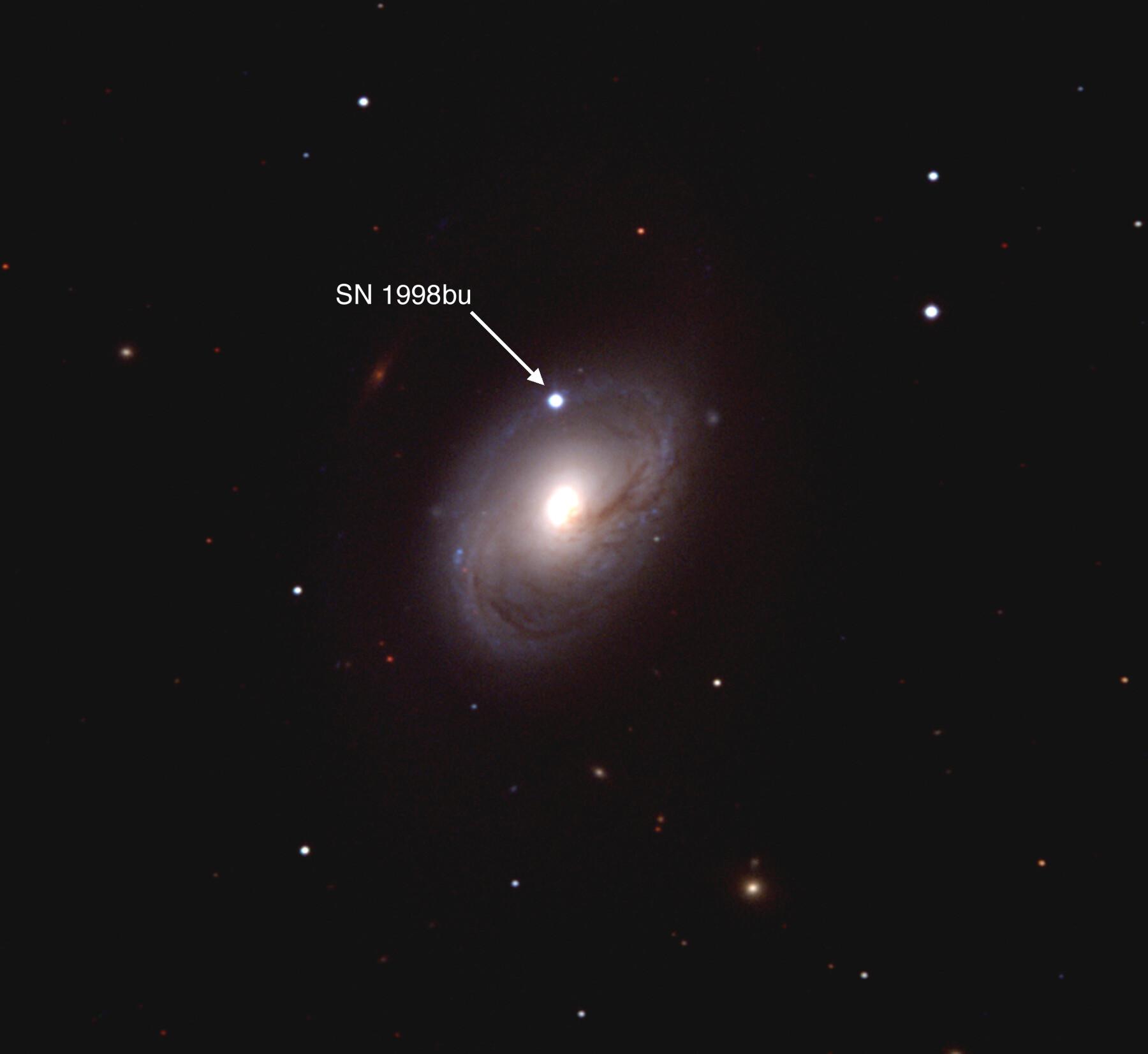
M96 with SN 1998bu imaged by the Cerro Tololo Inter-American Observatory

One supernova has been observed in M96. SN 1998bu (Type Ia, mag. 13) was discovered by Mirko Villi on May 9, 1998. It reached maximum brightness on May 21 at about magnitude 11.6, making it the brightest supernova of 1998, then steadily faded. Observations of the ejecta a year later showed creation of 0.4 solar masses of iron. The spectrum of the supernova remnant confirmed radioactive ^{56}Co, which decays into ^{56}Fe.

== M96 group ==
M96 is the brightest galaxy within the M96 Group, a group of galaxies in Leo, the other Messier objects of which are M95 and M105. To this are added at least nine other galaxies.

This is the nearest group to the Local Group to combine bright spirals and a bright elliptical galaxy (Messier 105).

== See also ==
- List of Messier objects
