= List of globular clusters =

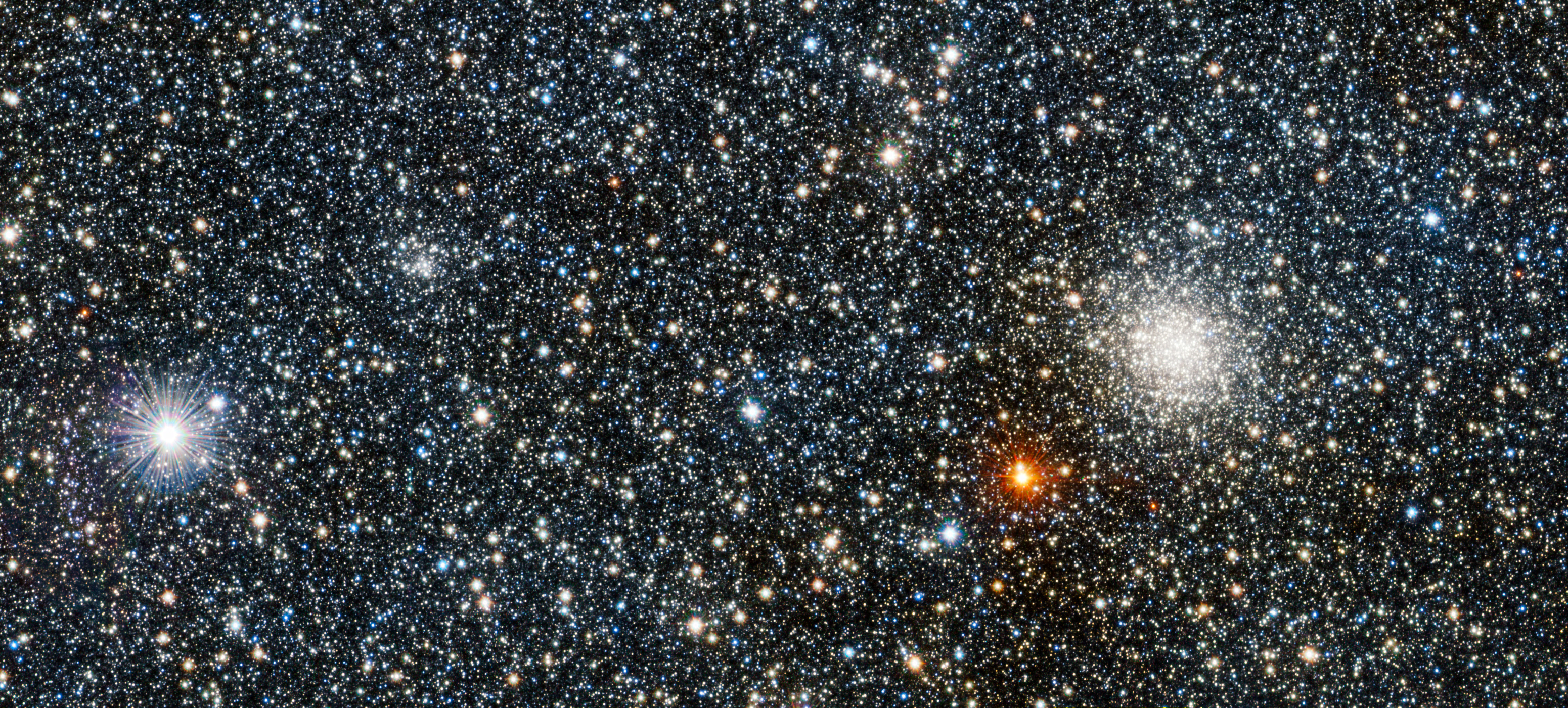
Image taken by ESO's VISTA of the Globular Cluster VVV CL001. On the right lies the globular star cluster UKS 1 and on the left (open image for annotation) lies a much less conspicuous new discovery, VVV CL001. The two are not physically located close to each other; this is a line-of-sight coincidence.

This is a list of globular clusters. The apparent magnitude does not include an extinction correction.

== Table ==
=== Milky Way ===
These are globular clusters within the halo of the Milky Way galaxy. The diameter is in minutes of arc as seen from Earth. For reference, the J2000 epoch celestial coordinates of the Galactic Center are right ascension 17^{h} 45^{m} 40.04^{s}, declination −29° 00′ 28.1″. A large proportion of globular clusters are located in the constellations Ophiuchus and Sagittarius, both of which lie in the direction of the galactic core.

Known and candidate Milky Way globular clusters
Identifier	Image	Epoch J2000		Constellation	Apparent Magnitude	Diameter (′)	Distance (ly)	Notes and references
Identifier	Image	Right ascension	Declination	Constellation	Apparent Magnitude	Diameter (′)	Distance (ly)	Notes and references
FSR 584		02^{h} 27^{m} 15^{s}	+61° 37′ 28″	Cassiopeia	N/A	6	4,570	Possibly an open cluster
M4 (Spider Globular Cluster)		16^{h} 23^{m} 35.36^{s}	−26° 31′ 32.7″	Scorpius	5.63	36	6,033	
NGC 6397		17^{h} 40^{m} 42.04^{s}	−53° 40′ 26.3″	Ara	5.73	31	7,800	
NGC 6544		18^{h} 07^{m} 20.58^{s}	−24° 59′ 50.7″	Sagittarius	7.77	9.1	9,450	
M22 (Great Sagittarius Cluster)		18^{h} 36^{m} 23.97^{s}	−23° 54′ 14.5″	Sagittarius	5.10	32	10,600 ± 1.0	
NGC 6366		17^{h} 27^{m} 44.24^{s}	−05° 04′ 47.5″	Ophiuchus	9.20	13	11,700	
NGC 6540		18^{h} 06^{m} 08.60^{s}	−27° 45′ 55.0″	Sagittarius	9.30	1.5	12,070 ± 0.98	
NGC 6752		19^{h} 10^{m} 52.11^{s}	−59° 59′ 02.2″	Pavo	5.40	29	13,000	
M71 (Angelfish Cluster)		19^{h} 53^{m} 46.49^{s}	+18° 46′ 45.1″	Sagitta	8.19	7.2	13,000	
Mercer 3 (GLIMPSE-C02)		18^{h} 18^{m} 30.50^{s}	−16° 58′ 38.0″	Sagittarius	unknown	unknown	13,000–26,000	
M10		16^{h} 57^{m} 09.03^{s}	−04° 06′ 00.6″	Ophiuchus	6.60	20	14,300	
47 Tucanae		00^{h} 24^{m} 05.67^{s}	−72° 04′ 52.6″	Tucana	4.09	50	14,500 ± 32.6	
NGC 3201		10^{h} 17^{m} 36.82^{s}	−46° 24′ 44.9″	Vela	6.75	20	14,800	
Omega Centauri		13^{h} 26^{m} 47.24^{s}	−47° 28′ 46.5″	Centaurus	3.9	55	15,800 ± 1.1	Visually brightest globular cluster, most massive and largest globular cluster in Milky Way
NGC 5466		14^{h} 05^{m} 27.29^{s}	+28° 32′ 04.0″	Boötes	9.04	9	16,000 ± 0.4	
2MASS-GC02 (Hurt 2)		18^{h} 09^{m} 36.50^{s}	−20° 46′ 44″	Sagittarius	24.60	1.9	16,000	
M12		16^{h} 47^{m} 14.18^{s}	−01° 56′ 54.7″	Ophiuchus	6.70	16	16,440 ± 0.16	
M55 (Specter Cluster)		19^{h} 39^{m} 59.71^{s}	−30° 57′ 53.1″	Sagittarius	6.32	19	17,600	
M28		18^{h} 24^{m} 32.81^{s}	−24° 52′ 11.2″	Sagittarius	6.79	11.2	18,260 ± 0.98	
NGC 6352		17^{h} 25^{m} 29.11^{s}	−48° 25′ 19.8″	Ara	7.96	9	18,300	
Terzan 5		17^{h} 48^{m} 04.80^{s}	−24° 46′ 45.0″	Sagittarius	13.85	2.4	18,800 ± 1.6	
NGC 4372		12^{h} 25^{m} 45.40^{s}	−72° 39′ 32.7″	Musca	7.24	5	18,900	
NGC 6304		17^{h} 14^{m} 32.25^{s}	−29° 27′ 43.7″	Ophiuchus	8.22	8	19,200	
Palomar 10		19^{h} 18^{m} 02.10^{s}	+18° 34′ 18.0″	Sagitta	13.22	4.0	19,200	
NGC 6553		18^{h} 09^{m} 17.60^{s}	−25° 54′ 31.3″	Sagittarius	8.06	9.1	19,600	
Terzan 1		17^{h} 35^{m} 47.80^{s}	−30° 28′ 11.0″	Scorpius	15.9	2.4	20,000	
M107 (Crucifix Cluster)		16^{h} 32^{m} 31.86^{s}	−13° 03′ 13.3″	Ophiuchus	7.93	13	20,900	
M62 (Flickering Globular Cluster)		17^{h} 01^{m} 12.80^{s}	−30° 06′ 49.4″	Ophiuchus	6.45	15	21,500 ± 1.3	
NGC 4833		12^{h} 59^{m} 34.46^{s}	−70° 52′ 32.2″	Musca	6.91	14	21,500	
NGC 6256		16^{h} 59^{m} 32.62^{s}	−37° 07′ 17.0″	Scorpius	11.29	4.1	22,000	
VVV CL160		18^{h} 06^{m} 57.0^{s}	−20° 00′ 40″	Sagittarius		6	22,170	
M13 (Great Hercules Cluster)		16^{h} 41^{m} 41.37^{s}	+36° 27′ 36.2″	Hercules	5.78	20	22,200	
NGC 6535		18^{h} 03^{m} 50.51^{s}	−00° 17′ 51.5″	Serpens	10.47	3.4	22,200	
FSR 9		18^{h} 28^{m} 30.6^{s}	−31° 54′ 24″	Sagittarius		7.2	22,500	
FSR 25		17^{h} 41^{m} 43.2^{s}	−19° 34′ 16″	Ophiuchus	N/A	unknown	22,830	
FSR 19		17^{h} 35^{m} 38.4^{s}	−21° 04′ 12″	Ophiuchus	N/A	unknown	23,480	
FSR 1776 (Minniti 23)		17^{h} 54^{m} 14.40^{s}	−36° 09′ 08.64″	Scorpius			23,610	
NGC 6717		18^{h} 55^{m} 06.04^{s}	−22° 42′ 04.1″	Sagittarius	9.28	5.2	23,800 ± 1.6	
NGC 5897		15^{h} 17^{m} 24.50^{s}	−21° 00′ 37.0″	Libra	8.53	11	24,100	
NGC 6558		18^{h} 10^{m} 17.80^{s}	−31° 45′ 50.0″	Sagittarius	9.26	4.1	24,100	
NGC 6760		19^{h} 11^{m} 12.01^{s}	+01° 01′ 49.8″	Aquila	8.88	9.6	24,100	
FSR 1716 (VVV CL005)		16^{h} 10^{m} 30.0^{s}	−53° 44′ 56″	Norma	N/A	3	24,460	
M5		15^{h} 18^{m} 33.51^{s}	+02° 04′ 54.9″	Serpens	5.65	21.6	24,500	
NGC 6362		17^{h} 31^{m} 54.99^{s}	−67° 02′ 54.0″	Ara	7.73	15	24,800	
NGC 6541		18^{h} 08^{m} 02.28^{s}	−43° 42′ 53.6″	Corona Australis	6.30	15	24,800 ± 0.3	
Palomar 6		17^{h} 43^{m} 42.20^{s}	−26° 13′ 21.0″	Ophiuchus	11.55	1.2	25,020 ± 0.62	
NGC 5927		15^{h} 28^{m} 00.69^{s}	−50° 40′ 22.5″	Lupus	8.01	6	25,100	
NGC 6401		17^{h} 38^{m} 36.60^{s}	−23° 54′ 34.2″	Ophiuchus	9.45	4.9	25,100	
NGC 6522		18^{h} 03^{m} 34.02^{s}	−30° 02′ 02.1″	Sagittarius	8.27	9.2	25,100	
NGC 6325		17^{h} 17^{m} 59.21^{s}	−23° 45′ 57.6″	Ophiuchus	10.33	4.1	25,400	
M9		17^{h} 19^{m} 11.53^{s}	−18° 30′ 58.2″	Ophiuchus	7.72	12	25,800	
NGC 6528		18^{h} 04^{m} 49.64^{s}	−30° 03′ 21.8″	Sagittarius	9.60	5	25,800	
NGC 6624		18^{h} 23^{m} 40.51^{s}	−30° 21′ 39.9″	Sagittarius	7.87	8.8	25,800 ± 1.1	
NGC 6712		18^{h} 53^{m} 04.30^{s}	−08° 42′ 22.0″	Scutum	8.10	9.8	26,400	
Liller 1		17^{h} 33^{m} 24.50^{s}	−33° 23′ 20.4″	Scorpius	16.77	6.8	26,400 ± 3.3	
NGC 6539		18^{h} 04^{m} 49.68^{s}	−07° 35′ 09.0″	Serpens	9.33	7.9	26,630	
M92		17^{h} 17^{m} 07.35^{s}	+43° 08′ 09.4″	Hercules	6.44	14	26,700	
NGC 6642		18^{h} 31^{m} 54.10^{s}	−23° 28′ 32.8″	Sagittarius	9.13	5.8	26,700 ± 2.3	
VVV CL001		17^{h} 54^{m} 42.5^{s}	−24° 00′ 53″	Sagittarius	N/A	N/A	26,800	
NGC 6440		17^{h} 48^{m} 52.70^{s}	−20° 21′ 36.9″	Sagittarius	9.2	4.4	27,100 ± 1.3	
M30 (Jellyfish Cluster)		21^{h} 40^{m} 22.12^{s}	−23° 10′ 47.5″	Capricornus	7.19	12	27,140 ± 0.65	
NGC 6355		17^{h} 23^{m} 58.60^{s}	−26° 21′ 12.3″	Ophiuchus	9.14	4.2	27,850 ± 0.62	
NGC 6342		17^{h} 21^{m} 10.08^{s}	−19° 35′ 14.4″	Ophiuchus	9.66	4.2	28,000	
NGC 6723		18^{h} 59^{m} 33.15^{s}	−36° 37′ 56.1″	Sagittarius	7.01	13	28,400	
M19		17^{h} 02^{m} 37.80^{s}	−26° 16′ 04.7″	Ophiuchus	6.77	17	28,700	
M69		18^{h} 31^{m} 23.10^{s}	−32° 20′ 53.1″	Sagittarius	7.64	8.45	29,000	
NGC 362		01^{h} 03^{m} 14.26^{s}	−70° 50′ 55.6″	Tucana	6.40	14	29,290 ± 0.20	
NGC 288		00^{h} 52^{m} 46.37^{s}	−26° 34′ 58.7″	Sculptor	8.09	13	29,220 ± 0.16	
FSR 1775		17^{h} 56^{m} 05.3^{s}	−36° 33′ 57″	Scorpius		6	29,030	
M70		18^{h} 43^{m} 12.76^{s}	−32° 17′ 31.6″	Sagittarius	7.87	8	29,400	
NGC 6139		16^{h} 27^{m} 40.37^{s}	−38° 50′ 55.7″	Scorpius	8.99	8.1	30,000	
M14		17^{h} 37^{m} 36.10^{s}	−03° 14′ 45.3″	Ophiuchus	7.59	11	30,300	
NGC 6287		17^{h} 05^{m} 09.13^{s}	−22° 42′ 29.6″	Ophiuchus	9.35	4.9	30,300	
NGC 6293		17^{h} 10^{m} 10.20^{s}	−26° 34′ 55.5″	Ophiuchus	8.22	8.1	31,000	
NGC 2808		09^{h} 12^{m} 03.05^{s}	−64° 51′ 48.6″	Carina	6.20	14	31,300	
NGC 6638		18^{h} 30^{m} 56.10^{s}	−25° 29′ 50.9″	Sagittarius	9.02	7.15	31,300 ± 1.6	
M80		16^{h} 17^{m} 02.41^{s}	−22° 58′ 33.9″	Scorpius	7.33	10	32,600	
FSR 190		20^{h} 05^{m} 31.3^{s}	+33° 34′ 09″	Cygnus	N/A	20.4	32,615	Candidate, possibly an open cluster
M56		19^{h} 16^{m} 35.57^{s}	+30° 11′ 00.5″	Lyra	8.27	8.8	32,900	
FSR 1700		15^{h} 38^{m} 52.5^{s}	−59° 16′ 03″	Norma	N/A	N/A	33,590	Candidate
M68		12^{h} 39^{m} 27.99^{s}	−26° 44′ 38.6″	Hydra	7.84	11	33,600	
M3		13^{h} 42^{m} 11.62^{s}	+28° 22′ 38.2″	Canes Venatici	6.19	18	33,900	
NGC 5986		15^{h} 46^{m} 03.25^{s}	−37° 47′ 10.6″	Lupus	7.52	9.7	33,900	
FSR 1767		17^{h} 35^{m} 43.0^{s}	−36° 21′ 28″	Scorpius		6	34,570	
NGC 2298		06^{h} 48^{m} 59.41^{s}	−36° 00′ 19.1″	Puppis	9.29	5	34,900	
NGC 6380		17^{h} 34^{m} 28.00^{s}	−39° 04′ 09.0″	Scorpius	11.31	3.6	35,500	
NGC 6569		18^{h} 13^{m} 38.80^{s}	−31° 49′ 36.8″	Sagittarius	8.55	6.2	35,500	
NGC 6388		17^{h} 36^{m} 17.23^{s}	−44° 44′ 06.9″	Scorpius	6.72	10.2	35,600 ± 1.5	
M15		21^{h} 29^{m} 58.33^{s}	+12° 10′ 01.1″	Pegasus	6.20	18	35,690 ± 0.43	
NGC 5286		13^{h} 46^{m} 26.81^{s}	−51° 22′ 25.7″	Centaurus	7.34	11	35,900	
Palomar 1		03^{h} 33^{m} 20.04^{s}	+79° 34′ 51.8″	Cepheus	13.18	2.8	36,500 ± 4.2	
NGC 6316		17^{h} 16^{m} 37.30^{s}	−28° 08′ 24.2″	Ophiuchus	8.43	5.2	36,860 ± 0.98	
NGC 6496		17^{h} 59^{m} 02.84^{s}	−44° 15′ 57.4″	Scorpius	8.54	5.8	36,900	
NGC 6453		17^{h} 50^{m} 51.70^{s}	−34° 35′ 57.0″	Scorpius	10.08	7.6	37,800	
FSR 1758		17^{h} 31^{m} 12^{s}	−39° 48′ 30″	Scorpius	<7	90	38,000	
NGC 1851		05^{h} 14^{m} 06.53^{s}	−40° 02′ 48.8″	Columba	7.14	12	39,500	
M79		05^{h} 24^{m} 11.09^{s}	−24° 31′ 28.0″	Lepus	7.73	9.6	42,000	
Palomar 8		18^{h} 41^{m} 29.90^{s}	−19° 49′ 33.0″	Sagittarius	11.02	5.2	42,100	
Palomar 11		19^{h} 45^{m} 14.40^{s}	−08° 00′ 26.0″	Aquila	9.80	10.0	42,400	
NGC 6441		17^{h} 50^{m} 13.03^{s}	−37° 03′ 04.6″	Scorpius	7.15	9.6	42,700 ± 2.3	
NGC 6284		17^{h} 04^{m} 28.65^{s}	−24° 45′ 53.5″	Ophiuchus	8.83	6.1	43,000	
Djorgovski 1		17^{h} 47^{m} 28.30^{s}	−33° 03′ 56.0″	Scorpius	13.6	2	44,700	
NGC 6584		18^{h} 18^{m} 37.60^{s}	−52° 12′ 56.8″	Telescopium	8.27	6.8	45,000	
NGC 6101		16^{h} 25^{m} 48.12^{s}	−72° 12′ 06.9″	Apus	9.16	5	47,600	
NGC 6356		17^{h} 23^{m} 34.96^{s}	−17° 48′ 47.0″	Ophiuchus	8.25	10	49,600	
IC 4499		15^{h} 00^{m} 18.57^{s}	−82° 12′ 49.6″	Apus	9.76	7.6	50,000	
NGC 6934		20^{h} 34^{m} 11.49^{s}	+07° 24′ 15.5″	Delphinus	8.83	7.05	52,000	
NGC 1261		03^{h} 12^{m} 16.21^{s}	−55° 12′ 59.2″	Horologium	8.29	6.85	53,500	
M72		20^{h} 53^{m} 27.80^{s}	−12° 32′ 13.7″	Aquarius	9.27	6.6	54,570 ± 1.17	
M2		21^{h} 33^{m} 28.01^{s}	−00° 49′ 23.4″	Aquarius	6.47	16	55,000	
Segue 3		21^{h} 21^{m} 31^{s}	+19° 07′ 02″	Pegasus	14.9	1.3	55,100 ± 2.3	
NGC 5053		13^{h} 16^{m} 27.09^{s}	+17° 42′ 00.5″	Coma Berenices	9.47	10	57,000	
M53		13^{h} 12^{m} 55.07^{s}	+18° 10′ 05.4″	Coma Berenices	7.61	13	58,000	
NGC 4147		12^{h} 10^{m} 06.30^{s}	+18° 32′ 33.5″	Coma Berenices	10.32	4.4	60,000	
NGC 6426		17^{h} 44^{m} 54.65^{s}	+03° 10′ 12.5″	Ophiuchus	11.01	4.2	67,000	
M75		20^{h} 06^{m} 04.75^{s}	−21° 55′ 16.2″	Sagittarius	8.52	6.8	67,500	
ESO 280-SC06		18^{h} 09^{m} 06.0^{s}	−46° 25′ 23″	Ara	12.00	1.5	69,800	
Terzan 7		19^{h} 17^{m} 43.70^{s}	−34° 39′ 27.0″	Sagittarius	12	6	75,700	
Palomar 5		15^{h} 16^{m} 05.25^{s}	+00° 06′ 41.8″	Serpens	11.75	8.0	76,000	
NGC 7492		23^{h} 08^{m} 26.63^{s}	−15° 36′ 41.4″	Aquarius	11.29	4.2	80,000	
IC 1257		17^{h} 27^{m} 08.5^{s}	−07° 05′ 35″	Ophiuchus	13.10	5.0	81,500	
NGC 5634		14^{h} 29^{m} 37.23^{s}	−05° 58′ 35.1″	Virgo	9.47	5.5	81,900 ± 3.8	
Palomar 13		23^{h} 06^{m} 44.44^{s}	+12° 46′ 19.2″	Pegasus	13.47	0.7	84,100	
Palomar 2		04^{h} 46^{m} 05.91^{s}	+31° 22′ 53.4″	Auriga	13.04	2.2	90,000	
NGC 6229		16^{h} 46^{m} 58.84^{s}	+47° 31′ 39.9″	Hercules	9.39	4.5	100,000	
Balbinot 1		22^{h} 10^{m} 42.82^{s}	+14° 56′ 49.0″	Pegasus	16.31	7.85	104,000	
NGC 5824		15^{h} 03^{m} 58.63^{s}	−33° 04′ 04.8″	Lupus	9.09	7.2	104,400	
Koposov 2		07^{h} 58^{m} 17.00^{s}	+26° 15′ 18.0″	Gemini	17.6	unknown	113,100	
NGC 5694		14^{h} 39^{m} 36.29^{s}	−26° 32′ 20.2″	Hydra	10.17	4.3	114,100	
Willman 1		10^{h} 49^{m} 24.00^{s}	+51° 03′ 00.0″	Ursa Major	15.3	1.75	124,000 ± 23	
Pyxis globular cluster		09^{h} 07^{m} 57.80^{s}	−37° 13′ 17.0″	Pyxis	12.9	4.0	130,000	
NGC 7006		21^{h} 01^{m} 29.38^{s}	+16° 11′ 14.1″	Delphinus	10.56	3.6	135,000	
Palomar 15		16^{h} 59^{m} 51.00^{s}	−00° 32′ 20.0″	Ophiuchus	14.00	3.0	145,500	
Koposov 1		11^{h} 59^{m} 18.50^{s}	+12° 15′ 36.0″	Virgo	14.2	unknown	157,500	
Laevens 3		21^{h} 06^{m} 55.05^{s}	−14° 59′ 03.84″	Delphinus			200000+4 −3	
Palomar 14		16^{h} 11^{m} 00.60^{s}	+14° 57′ 28.0″	Hercules	14.74	2.2	244,000	
NGC 2419		07^{h} 38^{m} 08.47^{s}	+38° 52′ 56.8″	Lynx	10.4	4.6	300,000	
Palomar 3		10^{h} 05^{m} 31.90^{s}	+00° 04′ 18.0″	Sextans	14.26	1.6	302,300	
Palomar 4		11^{h} 29^{m} 16.80^{s}	+28° 58′ 24.9″	Ursa Major	15.65	1.3	326,000	
Arp-Madore 1		03^{h} 55^{m} 02.30^{s}	−49° 36′ 55.0″	Horologium	15.72	0.5	398,000	
Laevens 1 (Crater cluster)		11^{h} 36^{m} 16.2^{s}	−10° 52′ 38.8″	Crater		0.47	470,000	
NGC 5946		15^{h} 35^{m} 28.52^{s}	−50° 39′ 34.8″	Norma	9.61	3	10.6	
NGC 6144		16^{h} 27^{m} 13.86^{s}	−26° 01′ 24.6″	Scorpius	9.01	7.4	8.9	
NGC 6235		16^{h} 53^{m} 25.31^{s}	−22° 10′ 38.8″	Ophiuchus	9.97	5	11.5	
NGC 6517		18^{h} 01^{m} 50.52^{s}	−08° 57′ 31.6″	Ophiuchus	10.23	4	10.6	
NGC 6652		18^{h} 35^{m} 45.66^{s}	−32° 59′ 25.8″	Sagittarius	8.62	6	10.0	
NGC 6749		19^{h} 05^{m} 15.30^{s}	+01° 54′ 03.0″	Aquila	12.44	4	7.9	
2MASS-GC01		18^{h} 08^{m} 21.81^{s}	−19° 49′ 47.0″	Sagittarius	27.74	3.3	3.6	
2MASS-GC03 (FSR 1735)		16^{h} 52^{m} 10.6^{s}	−47° 03′ 29″	Ara	12.90	0.8	9.8	
2MASS-GC04 (FSR 1767)		17^{h} 35^{m} 44.8^{s}	−36° 21′ 42″	Scorpius	N/A	unknown	1.5	Disputed
Arp-Madore 4		13^{h} 56^{m} 21.70^{s}	−27° 10′ 03.0″	Hydra	15.89	3	32.2	
BH 140		12^{h} 53^{m} 00.3^{s}	−67° 10′ 28″	Musca				
Camargo 1102		17^{h} 21^{m} 44.9^{s}	−26° 32′ 40″	Ophiuchus			8.2	
Camargo 1103		18^{h} 06^{m} 31.3^{s}	−25° 09′ 42″	Sagittarius			5.0	
Camargo 1104		18^{h} 05^{m} 14.2^{s}	−24° 58′ 46″	Sagittarius			5.4	
Camargo 1105		17^{h} 36^{m} 33.9^{s}	−28° 18′ 39″	Ophiuchus			5.8	
Camargo 1106		17^{h} 32^{m} 34.3^{s}	−30° 16′ 48″	Scorpius			4.5	
Camargo 1107		17^{h} 36^{m} 58.2^{s}	−30° 08′ 50″	Scorpius			4.0	Candidate
Camargo 1108		17^{h} 46^{m} 04.2^{s}	−30° 51′ 53″	Scorpius			3.3	Candidate
Camargo 1109		17^{h} 47^{m} 26.6^{s}	−26° 38′ 52″	Sagittarius			4.3	Candidate
CWNU 4193		08^{h} 04^{m} 41.7^{s}	−38° 55′ 16″	Puppis	N/A	N/A	12.8	Candidate
DB 44		17^{h} 46^{m} 35.0^{s}	−24° 53′ 28″	Sagittarius		6	8	Candidate
Djorgovski 2		18^{h} 01^{m} 49.1^{s}	−27° 49′ 33″	Sagittarius	9.90	9.9	6.3	
E 3 cluster		09^{h} 20^{m} 57.07^{s}	−77° 16′ 54.8″	Chamaeleon	11.35	10	8.1	
Eridanus globular cluster		04^{h} 24^{m} 44.5^{s}	−21° 11′ 13″	Eridanus	14.70	1.0	90.0	
ESO 224-8 (BH 176)		15^{h} 39^{m} 07.45^{s}	−50° 03′ 09.8″	Norma	14	3	18.9	
ESO 393-12		17^{h} 38^{m} 37.6^{s}	−35° 39′ 02″	Scorpius		6	8.2	
ESO 452-SC 11		16^{h} 39^{m} 25.45^{s}	−28° 23′ 55.3″	Scorpius	12	1.2	8.3	
ESO 456-09		17^{h} 53^{m} 54.3^{s}	−32° 27′ 58″	Scorpius		6	7.6	
ESO 456-78 (AL 3, BH 261)		18^{h} 14^{m} 06.60^{s}	−28° 38′ 06.0″	Sagittarius	11	1.3	6.5	
ESO 92-18		10^{h} 14^{m} 55.2^{s}	−64° 36′ 40″	Carina		6	10.6	
Ferrero 54		08^{h} 33^{m} 48.3^{s}	−44° 26′ 49″	Vela		6	7.1	
Gaia 2		01^{h} 52^{m} 28.8^{s}	+53° 02′ 24″	Perseus		6	4.91	
Garro 1		14^{h} 09^{m} 00.0^{s}	−65° 37′ 12″	Circinus			15.5	
GLIMPSE-C01		18^{h} 48^{m} 49.7^{s}	−01° 29′ 50″	Aquila	22.24		4.2	
Gran 1		17^{h} 58^{m} 36.61^{s}	−32° 01′ 10.72″	Norma			8.8	
Gran 2		17^{h} 11^{m} 33.6^{s}	−24° 50′ 56.4″	Ophiuchus	12.56		16.60	
Gran 3 (Patchick 125)		17^{h} 05^{m} 01.4^{s}	−35° 29′ 45.6″	Scorpius	12.63	4	12.02	
Gran 4		18^{h} 32^{m} 27.1^{s}	−23° 06′ 50.4″	Sagittarius	11.81		73.31	
Gran 5		17^{h} 48^{m} 54.7^{s}	−24° 10′ 12.0″	Sagittarius	12.11		4.47	
Haute-Provence 1 (HP 1)		17^{h} 31^{m} 05.2^{s}	−29° 58′ 54″	Ophiuchus	11.59	1.2	8.2	
IC 1276 (Palomar 7)		18^{h} 10^{m} 44.20^{s}	−07° 12′ 27.4″	Serpens	10.34	8.0	5.4	
Kim 1		22^{h} 11^{m} 41.3^{s}	+07° 01′ 31.8″	Pegasus			19.8	
Kim 2 (Indus I)		21^{h} 08^{m} 49.97^{s}	−51° 09′ 48.6″	Indus			105	
Kim 3		13^{h} 22^{m} 45.2^{s}	−30° 36′ 03.6″	Centaurus			15.14	
Kronberger 49		18^{h} 10^{m} 23.9^{s}	−23° 20′ 25″	Sagittarius	N/A	6	8.3	Globular cluster, or a gap in the interstellar dust distribution similar to Baade's Window
Lynga 7		16^{h} 11^{m} 03.65^{s}	−55° 19′ 04.0″	Norma	10.18	2.5	8.0	
Mercer 5		18^{h} 23^{m} 19.8^{s}	−13° 40′ 07″	Scutum	N/A	2	5.5	
Minniti 1		18^{h} 34^{m} 48^{s}	−28° 42′ 42″	Sagittarius			8.1	Candidate
Minniti 2		18^{h} 30^{m} 02^{s}	−28° 26′ 24″	Sagittarius			6.6	Candidate
Minniti 3		18^{h} 20^{m} 23^{s}	−32° 24′ 30″	Sagittarius			7	Candidate
Minniti 4		18^{h} 15^{m} 35^{s}	−28° 18′ 00″	Sagittarius			5.3	Candidate
Minniti 5		17^{h} 57^{m} 06^{s}	−35° 41′ 24″	Scorpius			8.5	Candidate
Minniti 6		18^{h} 08^{m} 22^{s}	−31° 06′ 18″	Sagittarius			8.4	Candidate
Minniti 7		18^{h} 01^{m} 36^{s}	−33° 55′ 06″	Sagittarius			6.8	Candidate
Minniti 8		18^{h} 22^{m} 19^{s}	−26° 37′ 42″	Sagittarius			7.2	Candidate
Minniti 9		17^{h} 10^{m} 30^{s}	−33° 15′ 06″	Sagittarius			8.5	Candidate
Minniti 10		17^{h} 42^{m} 46^{s}	−37° 18′ 54″	Scorpius			9.5	Candidate
Minniti 11		17^{h} 44^{m} 33^{s}	−34° 43′ 24″	Scorpius			5.9	Candidate
Minniti 12		17^{h} 42^{m} 36^{s}	−25° 33′ 24″	Ophiuchus			5.6	Candidate
Minniti 13		17^{h} 35^{m} 54^{s}	−34° 59′ 18″	Scorpius			6.2	Candidate
Minniti 14		17^{h} 43^{m} 03^{s}	−31° 07′ 12″	Scorpius			6.3	Candidate
Minniti 15		17^{h} 44^{m} 13^{s}	−32° 47′ 24″	Scorpius			7	Candidate
Minniti 16		17^{h} 21^{m} 23^{s}	−32° 49′ 18″	Scorpius			7	Candidate
Minniti 17		18^{h} 11^{m} 37^{s}	−29° 32′ 18″	Sagittarius			6	Candidate
Minniti 18		17^{h} 30^{m} 52^{s}	−27° 16′ 36″	Ophiuchus			7.9	Candidate
Minniti 19		17^{h} 40^{m} 31^{s}	−33° 57′ 42″	Scorpius			8.1	Candidate
Minniti 20		17^{h} 51^{m} 03^{s}	−29° 50′ 30″	Sagittarius			7.3	Candidate
Minniti 21		17^{h} 50^{m} 41^{s}	−34° 14′ 24″	Scorpius			7.6	Candidate
Minniti 22		17^{h} 48^{m} 51^{s}	−33° 03′ 42″	Scorpius	8.1		7.4	
Minniti 23		17^{h} 54^{m} 14.28^{s}	−36° 09′ 08.64″	Scorpius			8.4	Candidate
Minniti 24		18^{h} 01^{m} 48.00^{s}	−28° 21′ 36.72″	Sagittarius			7.9	Candidate
Minniti 26		17^{h} 44^{m} 28.80^{s}	−34° 48′ 19.80″	Scorpius			7	Candidate
Minniti 28		17^{h} 52^{m} 32.28^{s}	−33° 29′ 59.28″	Scorpius			10.1	Candidate
Minniti 29		17^{h} 52^{m} 23.78^{s}	−32° 17′ 55.32″	Scorpius			9.6	Candidate
Minniti 30		17^{h} 54^{m} 03.48^{s}	−31° 18′ 37.44″	Scorpius			9.9	Candidate
Minniti 31		17^{h} 58^{m} 36.79^{s}	−27° 38′ 21.48″	Sagittarius			9.1	Candidate
Minniti 32		18^{h} 06^{m} 24.79^{s}	−29° 18′ 29.16″	Sagittarius				Candidate
Minniti 33		17^{h} 49^{m} 51.79^{s}	−30° 44′ 12.48″	Scorpius			10.5	Candidate
Minniti 34		17^{h} 54^{m} 09.79^{s}	−28° 25′ 51.24″	Sagittarius			8.8	Candidate
Minniti 35		17^{h} 52^{m} 07.99^{s}	−28° 25′ 14.16″	Sagittarius			6.8	Candidate
Minniti 37		17^{h} 56^{m} 03.48^{s}	−29° 34′ 50.16″	Sagittarius			8.8	Candidate
Minniti 38		17^{h} 53^{m} 44.50^{s}	−30° 01′ 15.24″	Sagittarius			8.5	Candidate
Minniti 39		17^{h} 52^{m} 23.50^{s}	−29° 17′ 40.20″	Sagittarius			8.8	Candidate
Minniti 40		17^{h} 50^{m} 42.48^{s}	−29° 36′ 24.48″	Sagittarius			6.1	Candidate
Minniti 41		17^{h} 50^{m} 42.48^{s}	−29° 36′ 24.48″	Sagittarius			8.8	Candidate
Minniti 42		17^{h} 36^{m} 37.49^{s}	−29° 02′ 16.44″	Ophiuchus			10.4	Candidate
Minniti 48		17^{h} 33^{m} 18.0^{s}	−28° 00′ 02″	Ophiuchus		12	8.4	
Patchick 99		18^{h} 15^{m} 47^{s}	−29° 48′ 46″	Sagittarius			6.6	
Patchick 122		09^{h} 42^{m} 30.7^{s}	−52° 25′ 41″	Vela		3.2	5.6	
Patchick 126		17^{h} 05^{m} 38.6^{s}	−47° 20′ 32″	Ara		1.8	8.6	
PWM 2 (Pfleiderer 2)		17^{h} 58^{m} 40.00^{s}	−05° 04′ 30.0″	Ophiuchus	unknown	2.5		
Riddle 15		19^{h} 11^{m} 08.9^{s}	+14° 49′ 59″	Aquila		<2	18.1	
RLGC 1 (Ryu 059)		16^{h} 17^{m} 08.41^{s}	−44° 35′ 38.6″	Norma			28.8	
RLGC 2 (Ryu 879)		18^{h} 45^{m} 28.17^{s}	−05° 11′ 33.3″	Scutum			15.8	
Ruprecht 106		12^{h} 38^{m} 40.20^{s}	−51° 09′ 01.0″	Centaurus	10.9	2	21.2	
Sagittarius II		19^{h} 52^{m} 40.5^{s}	−22° 04′ 05″	Sagittarius			67	Possible satellite of the Sagittarius dSph
Terzan 2		17^{h} 27^{m} 33.10^{s}	−30° 48′ 08.4″	Scorpius	14.29	0.6	7.5	
Terzan 3		16^{h} 28^{m} 40.08^{s}	−35° 21′ 12.5″	Scorpius	12	3	8.2	
Terzan 4		17^{h} 30^{m} 39.00^{s}	−31° 35′ 43.9″	Scorpius	16	0.7	7.2	
Terzan 6		17^{h} 50^{m} 46.38^{s}	−31° 16′ 31.4″	Scorpius	13.85	1.4	6.8	
Terzan 8		19^{h} 41^{m} 45.00^{s}	−34° 00′ 01.0″	Sagittarius	12.4	4.4		
Terzan 9		18^{h} 01^{m} 38.80^{s}	−26° 50′ 23.0″	Sagittarius	16	0.2	7.1	
Terzan 10		18^{h} 03^{m} 36.40^{s}	−26° 04′ 21.0″	Sagittarius	14.9	1.5	5.8	
Terzan 11		18^{h} 12^{m} 15.80^{s}	−22° 44′ 31.0″	Sagittarius	15.63	1	6.9	
Teutsch 76		09^{h} 33^{m} 46.0^{s}	−57° 05′ 59″	Carina	N/A	N/A	13.2	Candidate
Tonantzintla 2		17^{h} 36^{m} 10.50^{s}	−38° 33′ 12.0″	Scorpius	12.24	2.2	8.2	
UKS 1		17^{h} 54^{m} 27.20^{s}	−24° 08′ 43.0″	Sagittarius	17.29	2	7.8	
VVV CL002		17^{h} 41^{m} 06.30^{s}	−28° 50′ 42.3″	Ophiuchus	N/A	N/A	8.6	
VVV CL003		17^{h} 38^{m} 54.56^{s}	−29° 54′ 25.3″	Ophiuchus	N/A	N/A	13.2	Possibly an open cluster, or a distant Galactic globular cluster
VVV CL110		17^{h} 22^{m} 47.0^{s}	−34° 41′ 17″	Scorpius	N/A	6	11.2	Candidate, possibly an open cluster
VVV CL119		17^{h} 30^{m} 46.0^{s}	−32° 39′ 05″	Scorpius		4.8	11.3	Candidate
VVV CL128		17^{h} 39^{m} 59.0^{s}	−32° 26′ 27″	Scorpius	N/A	6	11.4	Candidate, possibly an open cluster
VVV CL131		17^{h} 41^{m} 17.0^{s}	−34° 34′ 02″	Scorpius	N/A	6	9	
VVV CL143		17^{h} 44^{m} 36.0^{s}	−33° 44′ 18″	Scorpius	N/A	6	8.9	
VVV CL150		17^{h} 50^{m} 41.0^{s}	−25° 13′ 06″	Sagittarius	N/A	6	8.1	Candidate, possibly an open cluster
VVV CL153		17^{h} 53^{m} 32.0^{s}	−25° 22′ 56″	Sagittarius		3.6	10	Candidate
VVV CL154		17^{h} 55^{m} 08.0^{s}	−28° 06′ 01″	Sagittarius		6	8.9	Candidate

=== Local Group ===
Globular clusters of the Local Group
Identifier	Image	Epoch J2000		Apparent Magnitude	Diameter (′)	Galaxy
Identifier	Image	Right ascension	Declination	Apparent Magnitude	Diameter (′)	Galaxy
M54		18^{h} 55^{m} 03.33^{s}	−30° 28′ 47.5″	7.60	12	Sag DEG
Arp 2		19^{h} 28^{m} 44.11^{s}	−30° 21′ 20.3″	12.30	2.3	Sag DEG
Terzan 7		19^{h} 17^{m} 43.92^{s}	−34° 39′ 27.8″	12.00	1.2	Sag DEG
Terzan 8		19^{h} 41^{m} 44.41^{s}	−33° 59′ 58.1″	12.40	3.50	Sag DEG
Palomar 12		21^{h} 46^{m} 38.84^{s}	−21° 15′ 09.4″	11.99	2.9	Sag DEG
Whiting 1		02^{h} 02^{m} 57.00^{s}	−03° 15′ 10.0″	15.03	1.2	Sag DEG
NGC 1466		03^{h} 44^{m} 33^{s}	−71° 40′ 17″	11.4	1.9	LMC
NGC 1754		04^{h} 54^{m} 17.9^{s}	−70° 26′ 30″	12.0	3.3	LMC
NGC 1783		04^{h} 59^{m} 08.6^{s}	−65° 59′ 15.8″	10.93	5.3	LMC
NGC 1806		05^{h} 02^{m} 11.180^{s}	−67° 59′ 05.89″	10.6	2.1	LMC
NGC 1818		05^{h} 04^{m} 13.8^{s}	−66° 26′ 02″	9.7	3.4	LMC
NGC 1835		05^{h} 05^{m} 05.7^{s}	−69° 24′ 15″	10.6	5.6	LMC
NGC 1841		04^{h} 45^{m} 23.0^{s}	−83° 59′ 48″	14.1	2.4	LMC
NGC 1846		05^{h} 07^{m} 34.9^{s}	−67° 27′ 32.5″	11.5	3.8	LMC
NGC 1854		05^{h} 09^{m} 20.1^{s}	−68° 50′ 52.8″	10.4	2.3	LMC
NGC 1866		05^{h} 13^{m} 38.920^{s}	−65° 27′ 52.75″	9.73	5.5	LMC
NGC 1868		05^{h} 14^{m} 36^{s}	−63° 57′ 18″	11.6	3.9	LMC
NGC 2005		05^{h} 30^{m} 8.5^{s}	−69° 45′ 14.4″	11.6	1.6	LMC
Reticulum globular cluster		04^{h} 36^{m} 11.30^{s}	−58° 51′ 48.0″	12.7	5	LMC
SMASH 1		06^{h} 20^{m} 59.9^{s}	−80° 23′ 44.7″	N/A	N/A	LMC
YMCA 1		07^{h} 23^{m} 21.07^{s}	−64° 49′ 54.8″	N/A	N/A	LMC?
NGC 121		00^{h} 26^{m} 48.25^{s}	−71° 32′ 8.4″	11.24	3.1	SMC
Eridanus III		02^{h} 22^{m} 45.3^{s}	−52° 17′ 05″	N/A	N/A	SMC?
DES 1		00^{h} 33^{m} 59.8^{s}	−49° 02′ 19″	N/A	N/A	SMC?
Muñoz 1		15^{h} 01^{m} 48.02^{s}	+66° 58′ 07.3″	N/A	N/A	Ursa Minor Dwarf
NGC 1049 (Fornax 3)		02^{h} 39^{m} 52.5^{s}	−34° 16′ 08″	12.9	0.40	Fornax Dwarf
Fornax 1		N/A	N/A	N/A	N/A	Fornax Dwarf
Fornax 2		N/A	N/A	N/A	N/A	Fornax Dwarf
Fornax 4		N/A	N/A	N/A	N/A	Fornax Dwarf
Fornax 5		N/A	N/A	N/A	N/A	Fornax Dwarf
Fornax 6		N/A	N/A	N/A	N/A	Fornax Dwarf
Hodge IV		N/A	N/A	N/A	N/A	NGC 147
SD-10		N/A	N/A	N/A	N/A	NGC 147
AndI-GC1		N/A	N/A	N/A	N/A	Andromeda I
Mayall II (Andromeda's Cluster)		00^{h} 32^{m} 46.51^{s}	+39° 34′ 39.7″	13.7	0.17	Andromeda
G76		N/A	N/A	N/A	N/A	Andromeda
037-B327		N/A	N/A	N/A	N/A	Andromeda
GALEXASC J003819.45+414713.7		00^{h} 38^{m} 19.5^{s}	+41° 47′ 15″	~17-18	0.033	Andromeda?
Hubble I		N/A	N/A	N/A	N/A	Messier 110
Hubble II		N/A	N/A	N/A	N/A	Messier 110
Hubble IV		N/A	N/A	N/A	N/A	Messier 110
PGC 910901		00^{h} 01^{m} 29.5^{s}	−15° 27′ 51″	N/A	N/A	WLM
Globular cluster in Sextans B		10:00:02.926	+05:19:31.56	N/A	N/A	Sextans B

== See also ==
- Lists of astronomical objects
