= Xi Tucanae =

Xi Tucanae (ξ Tuc) can refer to:

- 47 Tucanae, the second-brightest globular cluster
- Xi Tucanae, more commonly known as HD 215562, designation assigned by Johann Elert Bode
