= NGC 362 =

Globular cluster located in the constellation Tucana

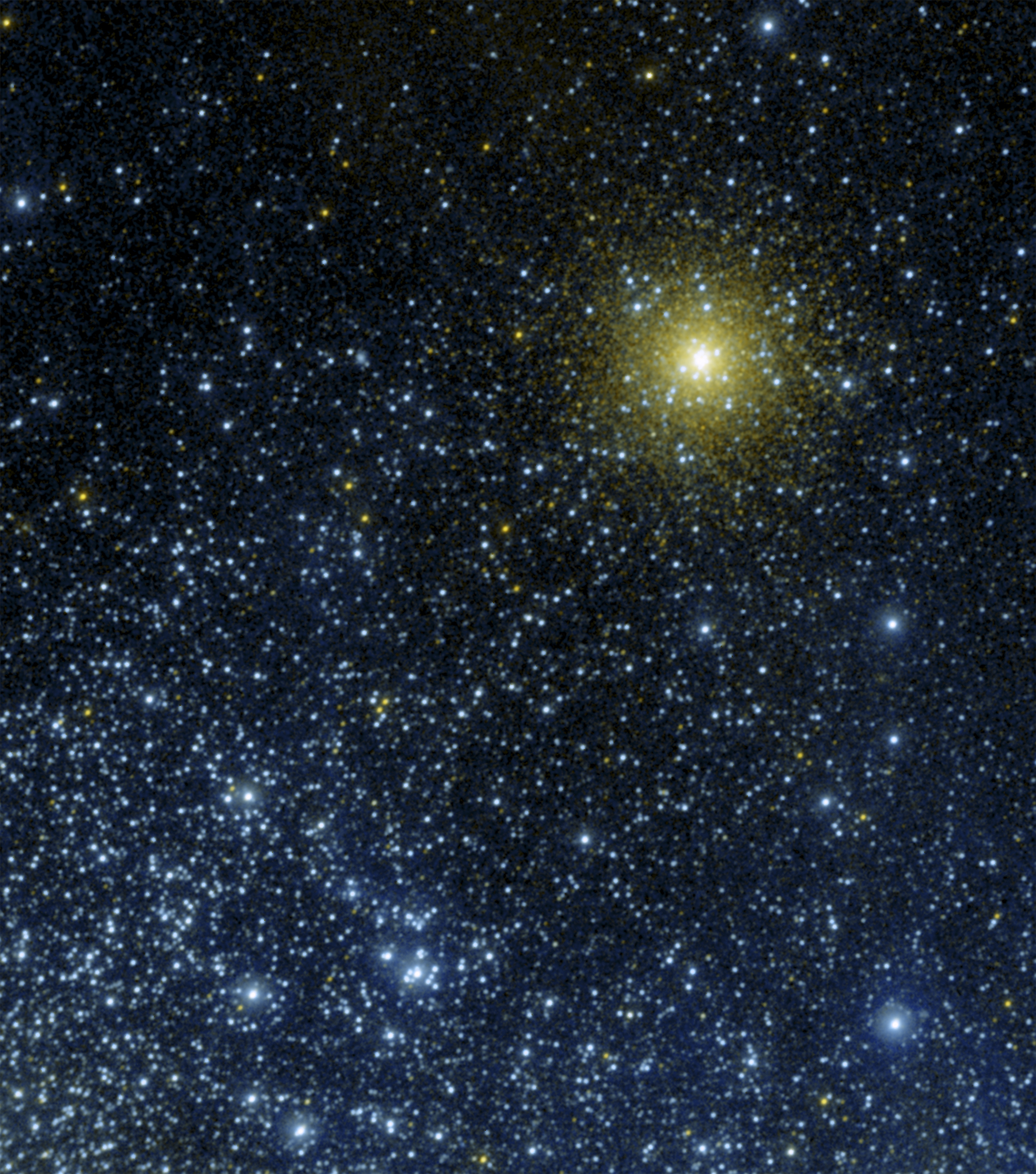
- False-color image of NGC 362 by GALEX;

Observation data
- Class: III
- Constellation: Tucana
- Right ascension: 01^{h} 03^{m} 14.26^{s}
- Declination: −70° 50′ 55.6″
- Distance: 29.29 ± 0.20 kly (8.98 ± 0.06 kpc)
- Apparent magnitude (V): 6.8
- Apparent dimensions (V): 14′

Physical characteristics
- Metallicity: [Fe/H] = –1.09 dex
- Estimated age: 11.0 ± 0.6 Gyr
- Other designations: Melotte 4

NGC 362 (also known as Caldwell 104) is a globular cluster located in the constellation Tucana in the Southern Hemisphere, slightly north of the Small Magellanic Cloud, to which it is completely unrelated. It was discovered on August 1, 1826, by James Dunlop. It is visible to the naked eye in dark skies, and is an impressive sight in a telescope, although it is somewhat overshadowed by its larger and brighter neighbour 47 Tucanae.

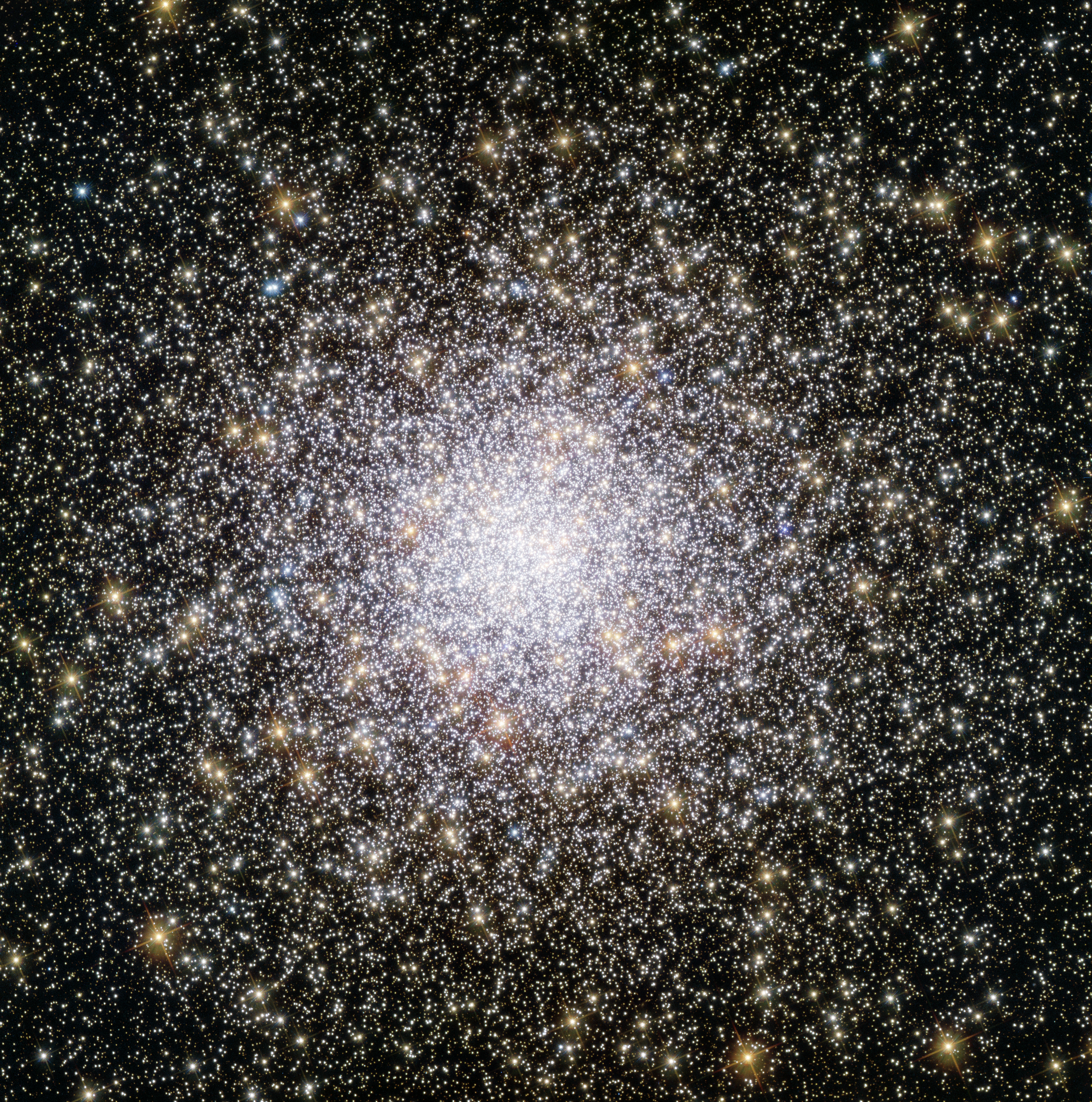
Image of NGC 362 by Hubble Space Telescope

The stars of NGC 362 have an average metallicity higher than the stars in most globulars. This implies that NGC 362 is a relatively young globular cluster. It also has an overabundance of binary stars, and an exceptionally tight core 13 light-years in diameter. The orbit of NGC 362 is highly eccentric, taking it to within 3,260 light-years of the Galactic Center.

== See also ==
- List of globular clusters
