= NGC 6388 =

Globular cluster in the constellation Scorpius

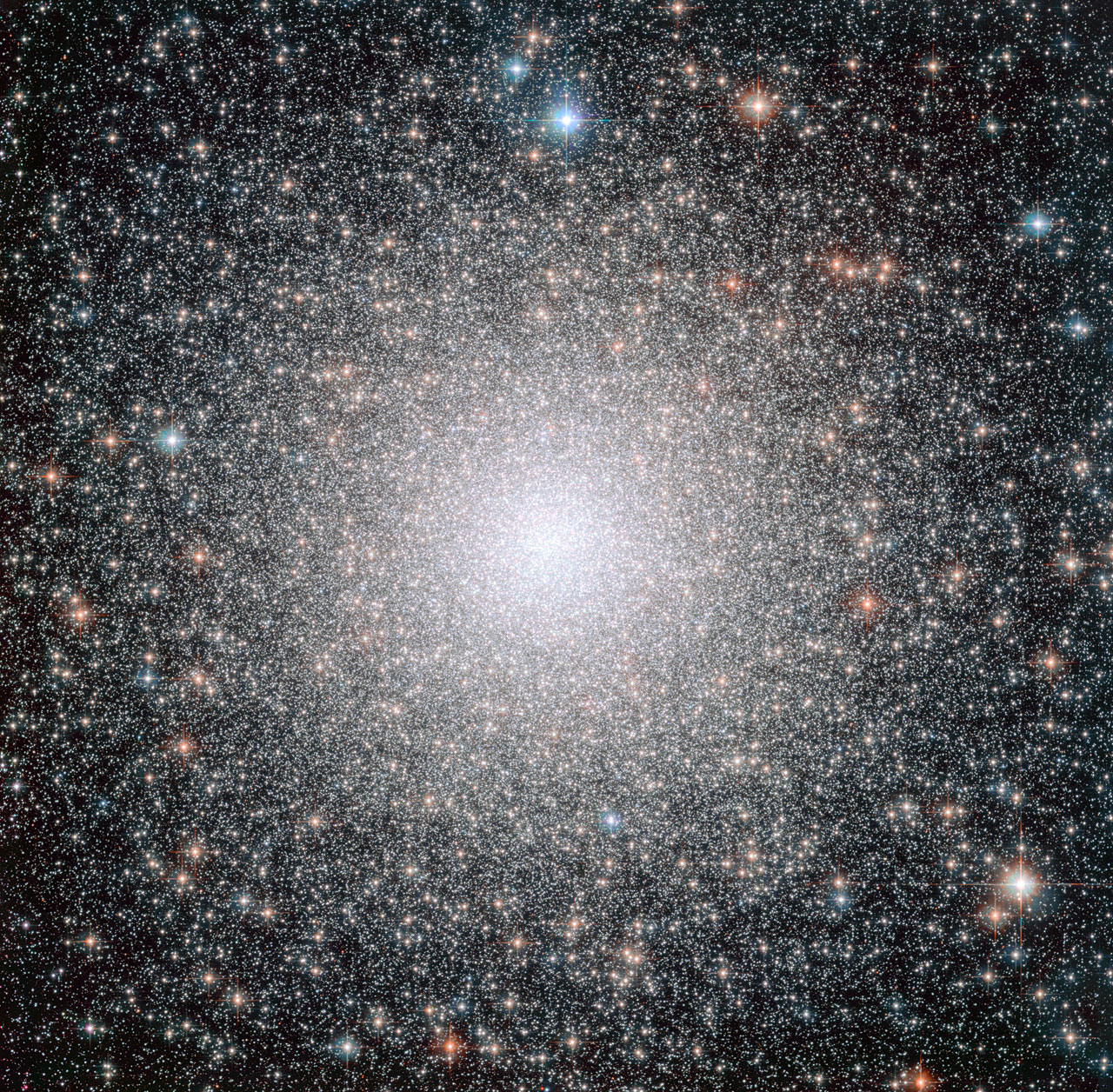

Observation data (J2000 epoch)
- Class: III
- Constellation: Scorpius
- Right ascension: 17^{h} 36^{m} 17.461^{s}
- Declination: −44° 44′ 08.34″
- Distance: 35.6 ± 1.5 kly (10.90 ± 0.45 kpc)
- Apparent magnitude (V): 6.8
- Apparent dimensions (V): 10.4′

Physical characteristics
- Mass: 2.17×10^{6} M_{☉}
- Tidal radius: 6.21′
- V_{HB}: 16.85
- Metallicity: [Fe/H] = −0.55 dex
- Estimated age: 11.5±1.5 Gyr

NGC 6388 is a globular cluster of stars located in the southern constellation of Scorpius. The cluster was discovered by Scottish astronomer James Dunlop on May 13, 1826 using a 20 cm (9 in) reflector telescope. It was later determined to be a globular cluster by English astronomer John Herschel, who was able to resolve it into individual stars. NGC 6388 is located at a distance of approximately 35,600 light-years (10.90 kpc) from the Sun. Due to its apparent visual magnitude of +6.8, binoculars or a small telescope are required to view it.

This cluster has an age of 11.5±1.5 Gyr and a core radius of 7.2″. The central velocity dispersion is 18.9 km/s, and the central density is 2.19×10^{5} L_{☉}·pc^{−3}. With an estimated mass of 2.17×10^{6} M_{☉}, it is one of the most massive globular clusters in the Milky Way. Multiple stellar populations have been detected. In the past it has been proposed that this cluster was accreted into the Milky Way galaxy. However, the abundance of stellar elements from a large sample of cluster members strongly indicate it was formed within the galaxy.

The Hertzsprung–Russell diagram for NGC 6388 shows that the main-sequence turnoff for this cluster is similar to that of the cluster 47 Tucanae. This suggests that the bulk of the stellar components have a similar age and chemical abundances between the two clusters. However, the RR Lyrae variables and hotter members of the horizontal branch in NGC 6388 appear overluminous. It has been suggested that this extended horizontal branch may be the result of a central intermediate mass black hole (IMBH). X-ray observations of the cluster rule out an accreting IMBH, but not a quiescent black hole. The stellar density and radial profiles of velocity dispersion rule out an IMBH with a mass greater than about 2,000 M_{☉}.

The cluster contains a population of blue straggler stars (BSS), which are the result of stellar mergers. The radial distribution of this population is high near the core, decreasing at intermediate distance before increasing again at larger radii. This bimodal distribution is similar to that in other globulars. However, the scale of the population at intermediate distances suggests that dynamic friction in NGC 6388 is less efficient at segregating BSS toward the core.

Examination of NGC 6388 by the Chandra observatory show 61 X-ray sources within a half-mass radius of the core (0.67′), with all having luminosities above 5×10^{30} erg. Five of these appear to be X-ray binaries.
