= NGC 121 =

Globular cluster in the constellation Tucana

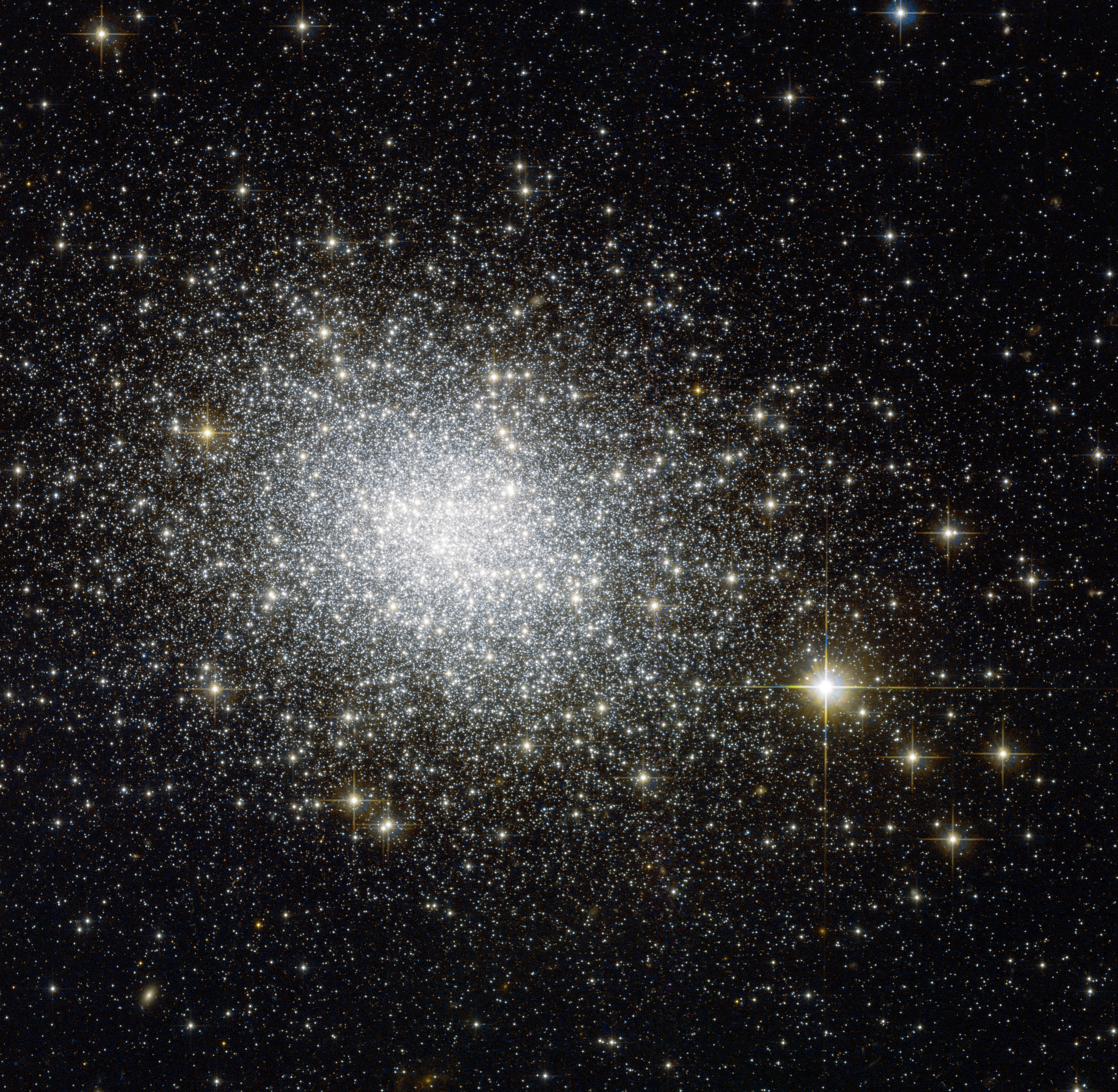
- Hubble Space Telescope image of globular cluster NGC 121

Observation data (J2000 epoch)
- Constellation: Tucana
- Right ascension: 00^{h} 26^{m} 49.0^{s}
- Declination: −71° 32′ 10″
- Distance: 200 kly (60 kpc)
- Apparent magnitude (V): 11.24

Physical characteristics
- Mass: 3.6+0.9 −0.7×10^{5} M_{☉}
- Radius: 98 ly (30.2 pc)
- Tidal radius: 143″
- Metallicity: [Fe/H] = −1.28±0.03 dex
- Estimated age: 10.5±0.5 Gyr

NGC 121 is a globular cluster of stars in the southern constellation of Tucana. It is the oldest globular cluster in the Small Magellanic Cloud (SMC), which is a dwarf satellite galaxy of the Milky Way. This cluster was first discovered by English astronomer John Herschel on September 20, 1835. The compiler of the New General Catalogue, Danish astronomer John Louis Emil Dreyer, described this object as "pretty bright, pretty small, little extended, very gradually brighter middle". The cluster is located at a distance of around 200,000 light-years (60 kpc) from the Sun.

This cluster forms part of the West Halo, a region that is moving outward with respect to the rest of the SMC. It is located about 2.3° northwest of the SMC galactic center. The cluster mass is 3.6×10^{5} times the mass of the Sun. The angular half-light radius of this cluster is 27.1″, and the tidal radius is 143″. It is positioned about ~32′ from the massive globular cluster 47 Tucanae, which has a tidal radius of 42.86′.

NGC 121 is the only old globular cluster in the SMC that is similar to Galactic clusters in the Milky Way. Age estimates for this cluster range from 10.5 to 11.8 billion years old, which is 2-3 billion years younger than the oldest such comparable clusters in the Milky Way. The aging giant stars in this cluster demonstrate that there are two distinct stellar populations, with the younger population being chemically enriched from the output of the first generation. The second generation forms a relatively low ~32% of the total population, but this amount is enhanced in the central portion of the cluster. This suggests the later generation is more centrally concentrated.

RR Lyrae variable stars were detected in this cluster in 1988. 20 candidate Dwarf Cepheid candidates were reported in 2008, including SX Phoenicis variables. In 1998, 42 potential blue stragglers were identified via imaging by the Hubble Space Telescope.
