= NGC 6380 =

Globular cluster in the constellation of Ophiuchus

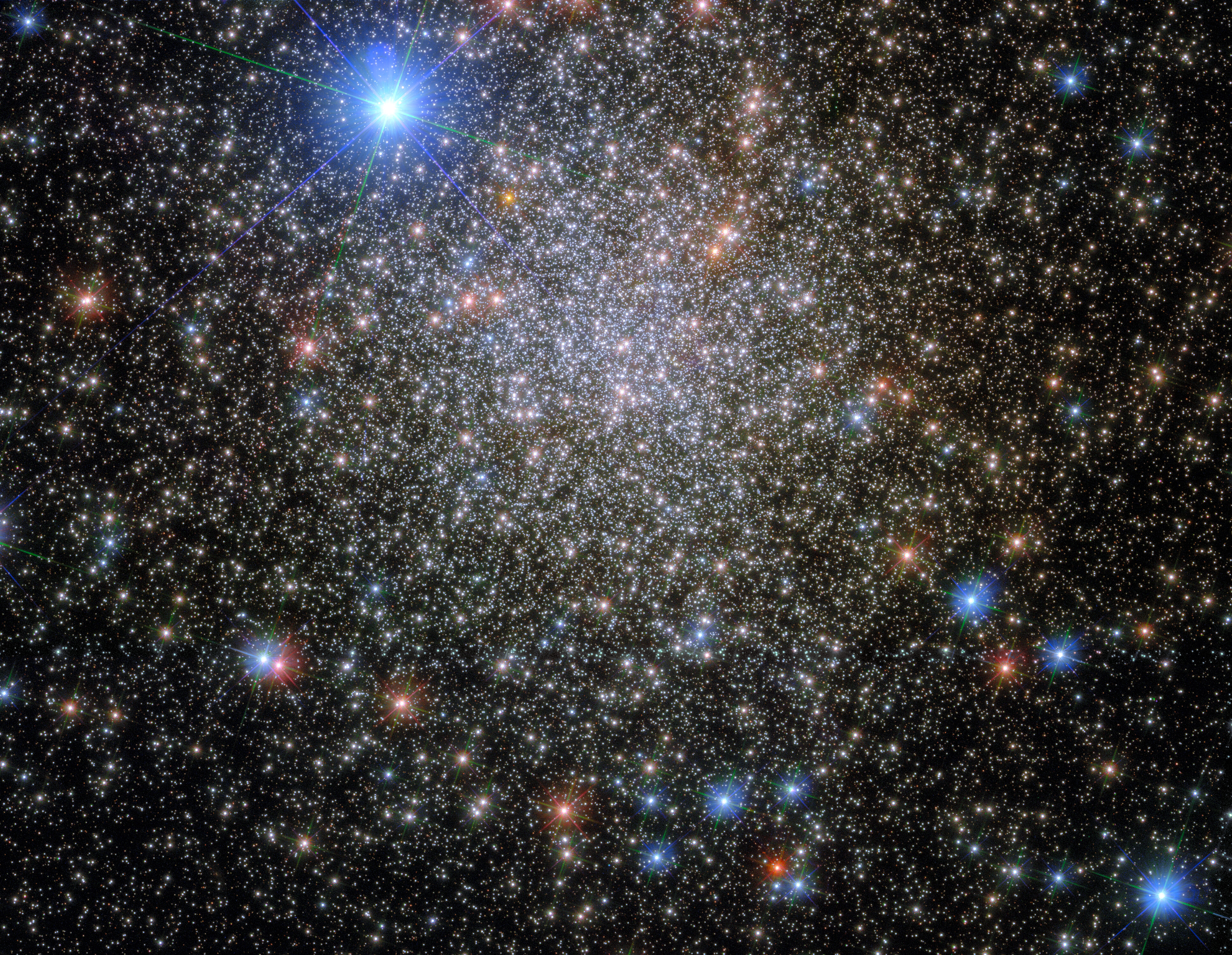
- NGC 6380 as seen through the Hubble Space Telescope

Observation data (J2000 epoch)
- Constellation: Scorpius
- Right ascension: 17^{h} 34^{m} 28.00^{s}
- Declination: −39° 04′ 09.0″
- Distance: 35,500 ly (10,900 pc)
- Apparent magnitude (V): 11.31
- Apparent dimensions (V): 12.1′ × 12.1′

Physical characteristics
- Metallicity: [Fe/H] = −0.75 dex
- Other designations: GCl 68, Tonantzintla 1, Pişmiş 25

NGC 6380 is a globular cluster located in the constellation Scorpius. It was originally discovered by James Dunlop in 1826, and he named it Dun 538. Eight years later, in 1834, it was independently rediscovered by John Herschel and he named it H 3688. The cluster was re-rediscovered in 1959 by Paris Pişmiş, who catalogued it as Tonantzintla 1 — and referred to it as Pişmiş 25. Until the 1950s NGC 6380 was thought to be an open cluster. It was A. D. Thackeray who realised that it was in fact a globular cluster. Nowadays, this cluster is reliably recognised in widely available catalogues as a globular cluster, and referred to simply as NGC 6380.

== See also ==
- List of NGC objects (6001–7000)
- List of NGC objects
