= NGC 5927 =

Globular cluster in the constellation Lupus

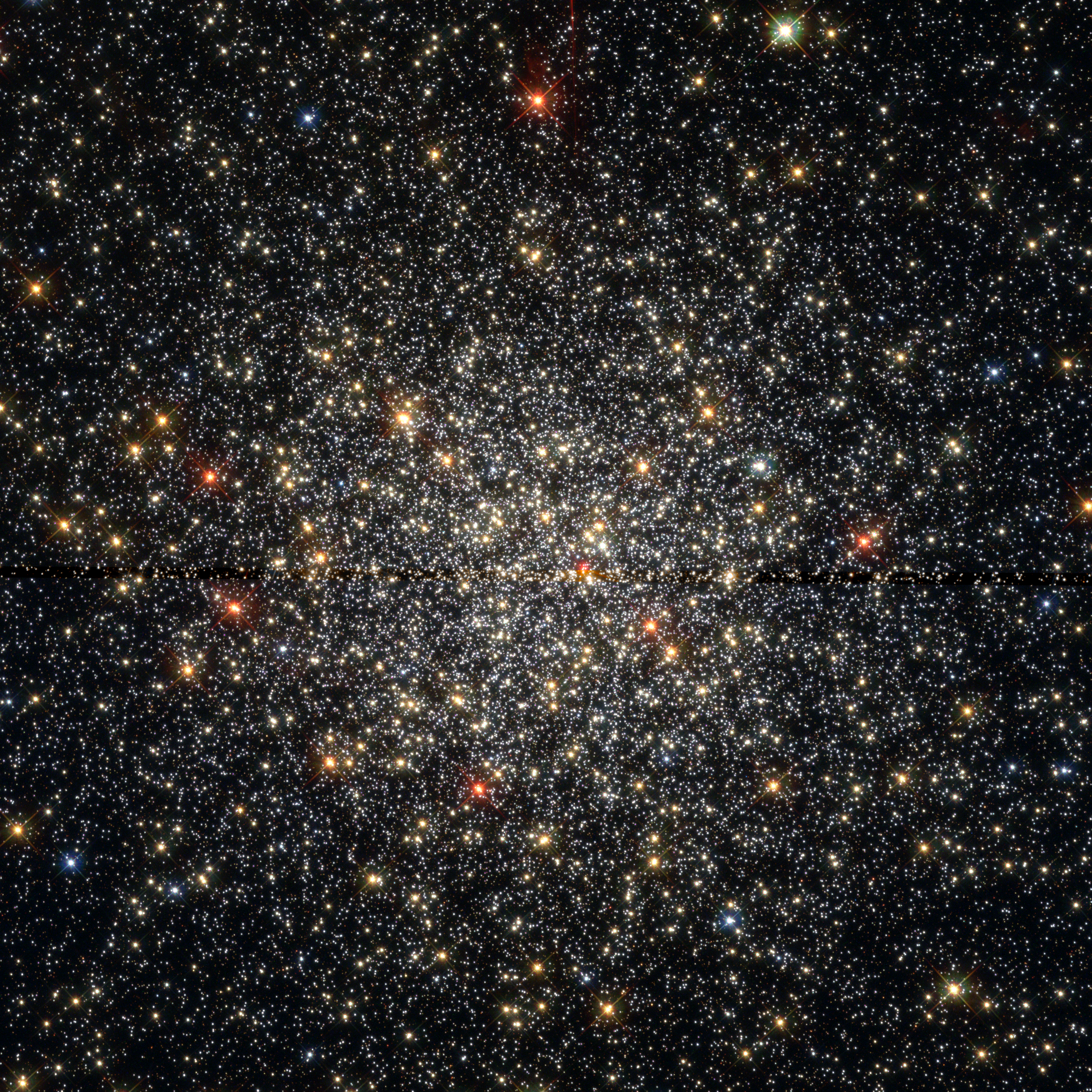
- The globular cluster NGC 5927 imaged by the Hubble Space Telescope

Observation data (J2000 epoch)
- Class: VIII
- Constellation: Lupus
- Right ascension: 15^{h} 28^{m} 00.69^{s}
- Declination: −50° 40′ 22.9″
- Distance: 25.1 kly (7.7 kpc)
- Apparent magnitude (V): 8.86

Physical characteristics
- Radius: 6.0' x 6.0'
- Metallicity: [Fe/H] = −0.49 dex
- Other designations: GCl 35, GCRV 5278 E, VDBH 173

NGC 5927 is a globular cluster in the constellation Lupus. NGC 5927 has a diameter of about 12 arcminutes and an apparent magnitude of +8.86. Its Shapley–Sawyer Concentration Class is VIII, and it contains stars of magnitude 15 and dimmer.

The globular cluster was discovered by the astronomer James Dunlop in 1826 and was also observed in 1834 by John Herschel.

NGC 5927 is relatively metal-rich for a globular cluster, and may have multiple generations of stars.
