= NGC 6453 =

Globular cluster in the constellation of Scorpius

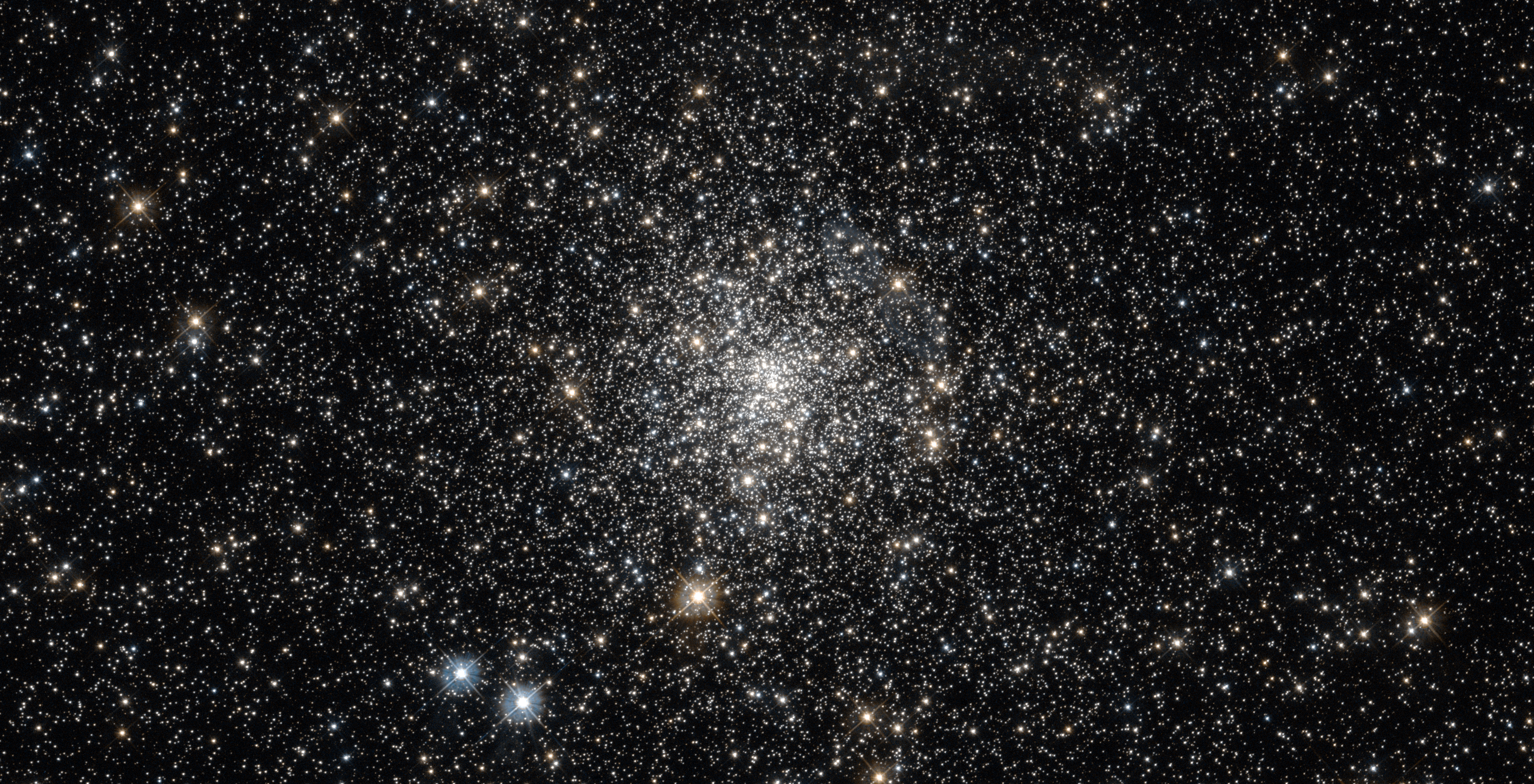
- NGC 6453, imaged by the Hubble Space Telescope

Observation data (J2000 epoch)
- Class: IV
- Constellation: Scorpius
- Right ascension: 17^{h} 50^{m} 51.71^{s}
- Declination: −34° 35′ 59.60″
- Distance: 37.8 kly (11.6 kpc)
- Apparent magnitude (V): 10.10
- Apparent dimensions (V): 21.5′

Physical characteristics
- Mass: 169,000 M_{☉}
- Metallicity: [Fe/H] = –1.50 dex
- Other designations: ESO 393-SC 036, GC 5878, h 3707

NGC 6453 is a globular cluster approximately 37,000 light-years away from Earth in the constellation of Scorpius.

The cluster is located approximately 1 kpc (~3,260 light-years) from the Galactic Center, which results in confounded view of the cluster from the Solar System due to many intervening clouds of cosmic dust.

The cluster measures nearly 8' across, and its brightest stars are no brighter than 14th magnitude.

== Observational history ==
NGC 6453 was discovered by John Herschel on June 8, 1837, while he was observing from the Cape of Good Hope in South Africa. He included the cluster as "h 3708" in his 1864 Catalogue of Nebulae and Clusters of Stars, and Danish-Irish astronomer John Dreyer later added the cluster to his New General Catalogue as object number 6453. Dreyer described the cluster as "considerably large, irregularly round, pretty much brighter (in the) middle, round".

== See also ==
- Globular cluster
- List of NGC objects (6001–7000)
- Scorpius (constellation)
