= VVV CL001 =

One of the most metal poor globular clusters

VVVCL001
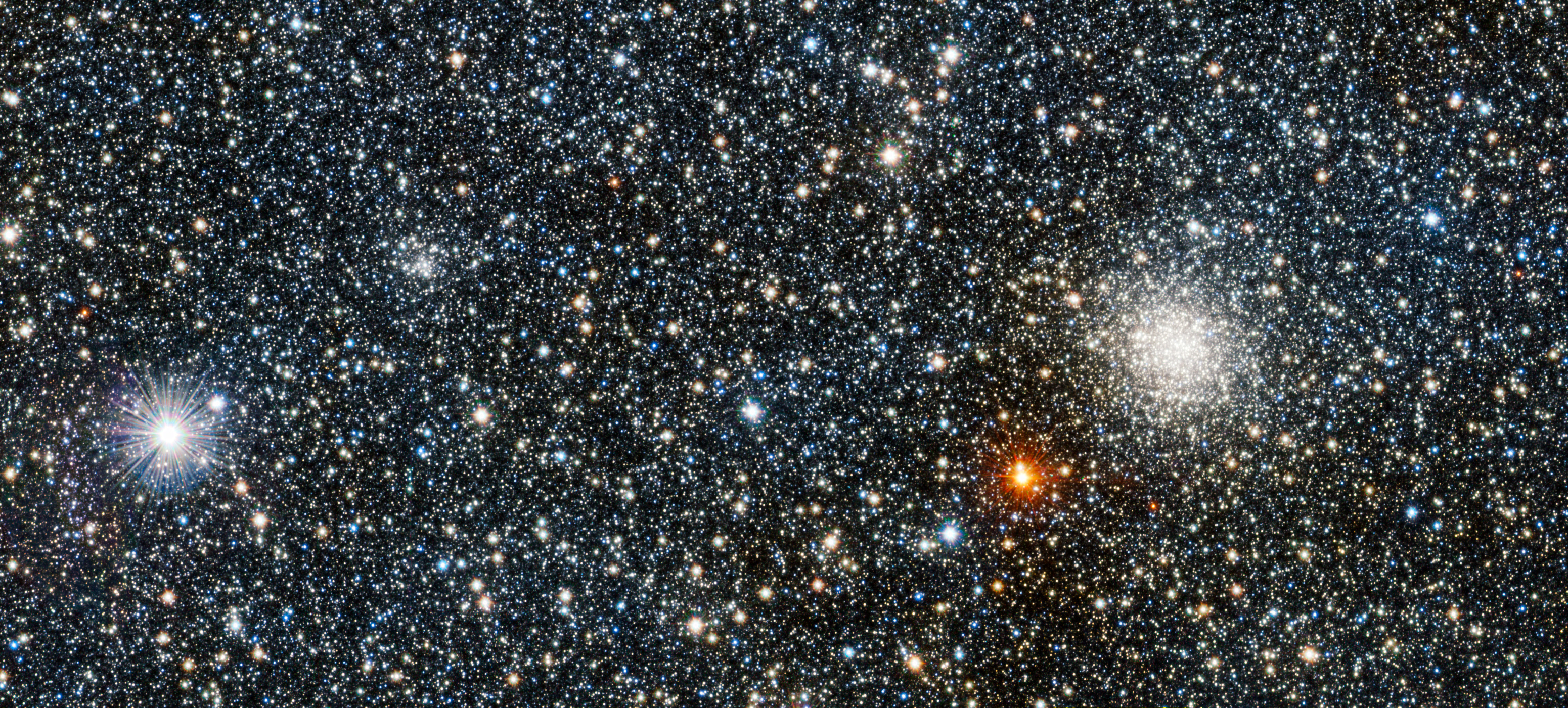
- The Vista Variables in the Via Lactea (VVV) survey showing VVV CL001 located inconspicuously to the left while UKS 1 is on the right

Observation data
- Constellation: Sagittarius
- Right ascension: 17h 54m 37.17s
- Declination: −24° 4' 51.34"
- Distance: 26,800 ly (8.22 kpc)

Physical characteristics
- Estimated age: 11.9 gya
- Notable features: One of the most metal poor globular clusters

VVV CL001 is a globular cluster located around 8.22 kiloparsecs from Earth in the constellation of Sagittarius. It is the most metal poor globular cluster discovered around the Milky Way. It is an old globular cluster with an age of 11.9 billion years. VVV CL001 is likely an ancient relic that was left behind by a past galactic merger by a massive galaxy early in the evolution of the Milky Way galaxy. It has a mass of 1.5×10^{5} solar masses.

It may be in a physical binary with another globular cluster known as UKS 1 however it is still being decided if they are an actual binary or have similar radial velocity.

== Discovery ==
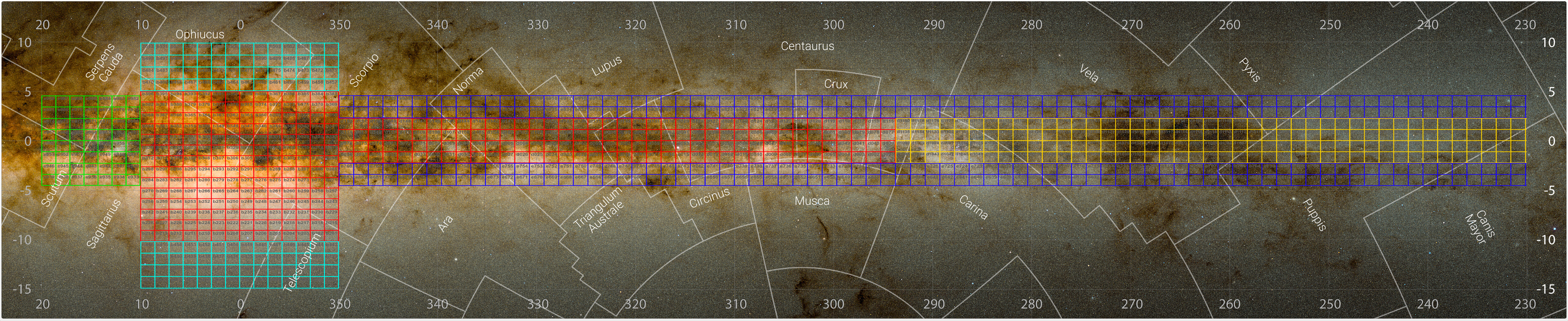
Area of the Milky Way mapped by the VVV and VVVX surveys

VVV CL001 was discovered by using the VISTA Variables in the Via Lactea (VVV) survey. It has several aims such as resolving the three-dimensional structure of the Milky Way galaxy by precisely measuring the distribution of RR Lyrae, Cepheids, and red clump stars. Another aim of the VVV survey is to accurately measure the physical parameters of known globular clusters and search for new ones. It was this which discovered VVV CL001.
