= NGC 1846 =

Globular cluster in the constellation Dorado

- Picture from JWST and the Hubble Space Telescope. The planetary nebula is here on the right side and has a red-blue color.

Observation data (J2000 epoch)
- Constellation: Dorado
- Right ascension: 05^{h} 07^{m} 34.900^{s}
- Declination: −67° 27′ 32.45″
- Distance: 160,000 ly (50000 pc)
- Apparent magnitude (V): 10.68
- Apparent dimensions (V): 3.8′

Physical characteristics
- Mass: 5.7×10^{4} M_{☉}
- Estimated age: 1.70±0.05 Gyr

NGC 1846 is a globular cluster containing hundreds of thousands of stars in the outer halo of the Large Magellanic Cloud. It was discovered on November 6, 1826, by James Dunlop and is included in the New General Catalogue. At an aperture of 50 arcseconds, its apparent V-band magnitude is 10.68, but at this wavelength, it has 0.07 magnitudes of interstellar extinction.

NGC 1846 is about 1.7 billion years old. Its estimated mass is 5.7×10^{4} M_{☉}, and its total luminosity is 1.68×10^{5} L_{☉}, leading to a mass-to-luminosity ratio of 0.34 M_{☉}/L_{☉}. All else equal, older star clusters have higher mass-to-luminosity ratios; that is, they have lower luminosities for the same mass.

In an image taken by the Hubble Space Telescope in 2006, astronomers spotted a green planetary nebula towards the bottom of the image. It is uncertain whether NGC 1846 contains this planetary nebula or if it just happened to be on the same line of sight; however, measurements of the motion of the cluster's stars along with the nebula's central star lead to the conclusion that it is a member of the cluster. The planetary nebula was first noted in 1984 by D. H. Morgan and is called Mo-17. High-resolution VLT spectra show that Mo-17 has a similar radial velocity compared to the star cluster. The researchers find a 97% probability that it belongs to the cluster.

== Gallery ==
Hubble image of the planetary nebula Mo-17

JWST NIRCam image of Mo-17

Hubble image of the cluster with the planetary nebula at the bottom
