= NGC 5986 =

Globular cluster in the constellation Lupus

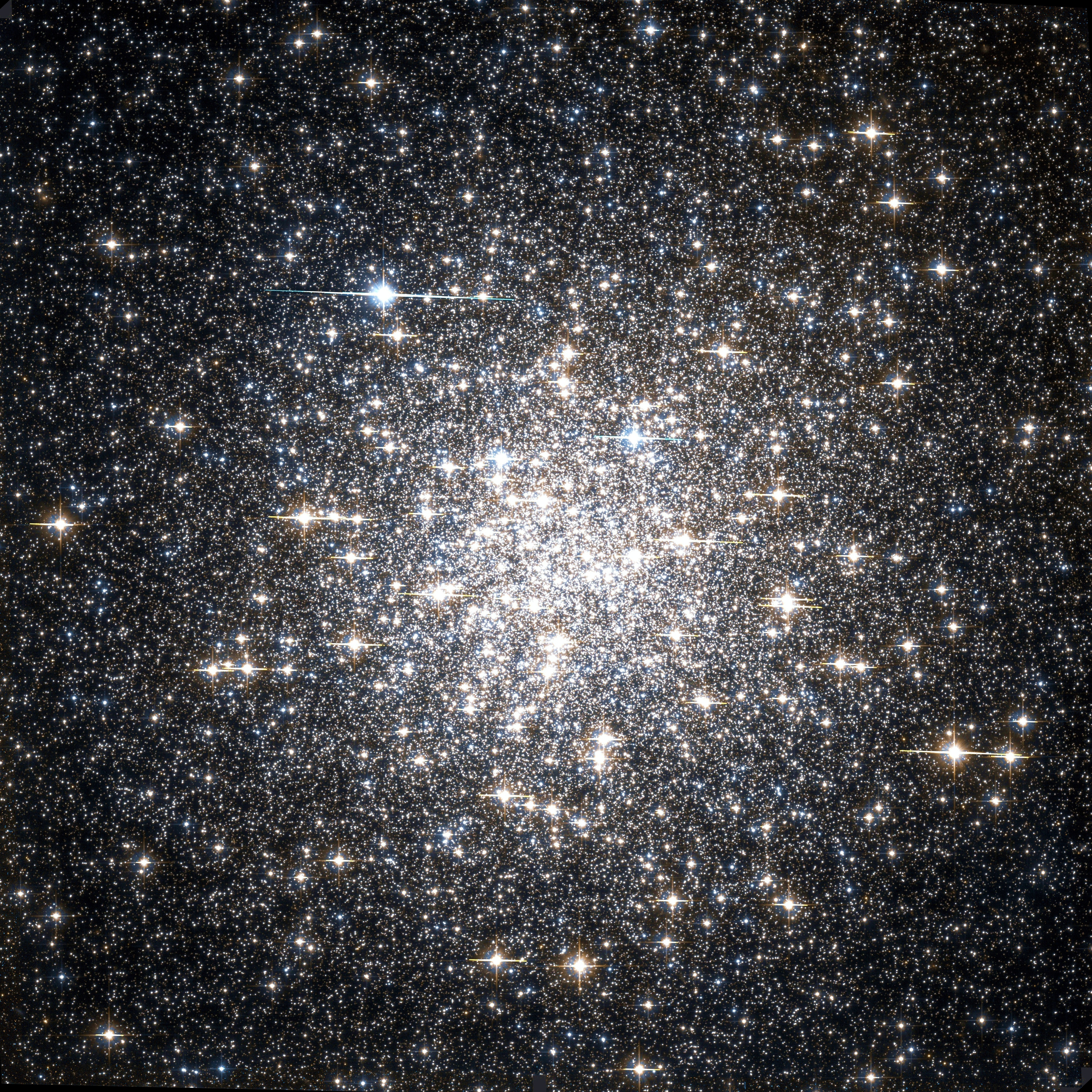
- NGC 5986 by Hubble Space Telescope; 3.5′ view

Observation data (J2000 epoch)
- Class: VII
- Constellation: Lupus
- Right ascension: 15^{h} 46^{m} 03.00^{s}
- Declination: –37° 47′ 11.1″
- Distance: 33.9 kly (10.4 kpc)
- Apparent magnitude (V): 8.0
- Apparent dimensions (V): 5'

Physical characteristics
- Absolute magnitude: −8.44
- Mass: 5.99×10^{5} M_{☉}
- Metallicity: [Fe/H] = −1.35 dex
- Estimated age: 12.16 Gyr
- Other designations: ESO 329-SC 018, NGC 5986

NGC 5986 is a globular cluster of stars in the southern constellation of Lupus, located at a distance of approximately 34 kilolight-years from the Sun. It was discovered by Scottish astronomer James Dunlop on May 10, 1826. John L. E. Dreyer described it as, "a remarkable object, a globular cluster, very bright, large, round, very gradually brighter middle, stars of 13th to 15th magnitude". Its prograde–retrograde orbit through the Milky Way galaxy is considered irregular and highly eccentric. It has a mean heliocentric radial velocity of +100 km/s. The galacto-centric distance is 17 kly (5.2 kpc), which puts it in the galaxy's inner halo.

This is relatively massive cluster has been poorly studied, at least as of 2017. It is moderately concentrated, with a core radius of 28.2″ and a projected half-light radius of 58.8″. The three dimensional half-mass radius is ~78.16″. The cluster has a higher metallicity – what astronomers term the abundance of elements with higher atomic number then helium – compared to most other objects of its type. It may have at least 4–5 different stellar populations with distinct elemental compositions, and there is evidence that it has lost ~60–80% of its original mass.
