= NGC 5824 =

Globular cluster in the constellation Lupus

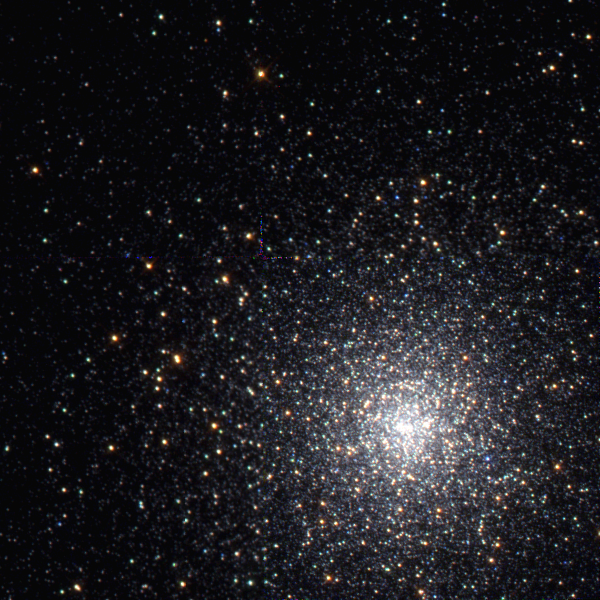
- NGC 5824, imaged by the Hubble Space Telescope

Observation data (J2000 epoch)
- Class: I
- Constellation: Lupus
- Right ascension: 15^{h} 03^{m} 58.6^{s}
- Declination: –33° 04′ 07″
- Distance: 104.4 kly
- Apparent magnitude (V): 9.09
- Apparent dimensions (V): 6.2'

Physical characteristics
- Metallicity: [Fe/H] = –1.60 dex
- Estimated age: 12.80 Gyr
- Other designations: ESO 387-SC 001

NGC 5824 is a globular cluster in the constellation Lupus, almost on its western border with Centaurus. Astronomers James Dunlop (1826), John Herschel (1831) and E.E. Barnard (1882) all claim to have independently discovered the cluster. It is condensed and may be observed with small telescopes, but larger apertures are required to resolve its stellar core.

A stellar stream, known as the Triangulum stellar stream, is thought to have originated from NGC 5824. It is located quite far from NGC 5824 and is part of its leading tail. Meanwhile, its trailing tail has also been detected, spanning about 50 degrees through the sky.

== See 217 (HD 132955) ==
As seen from Earth, the location of NGC 5824 is half a degree south-southeast of the double star See 217 (HD 132955), magnitude +5. Amateur astronomers could use See 217 as guidestar to try to detect NGC 5824.
