= NGC 1868 =

Globular cluster in the constellation Dorado

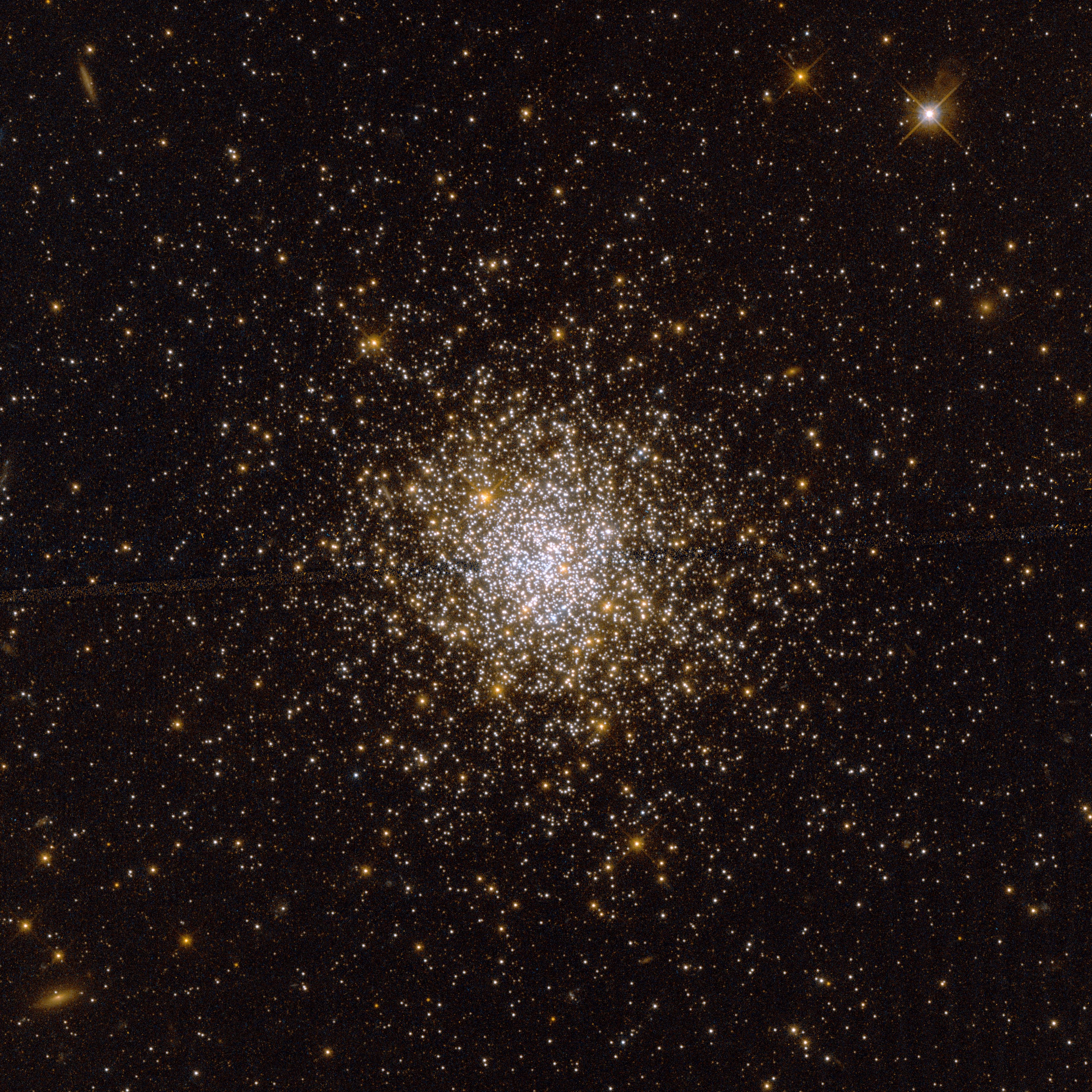
- Photograph of NGC 1868 taken by the Hubble Space Telescope

Observation data (J2000 epoch)
- Constellation: Dorado
- Right ascension: 05^{h} 14^{m} 36^{s}
- Declination: −63° 57′ 18″
- Distance: ~163000 ly (~50000 pc)
- Apparent magnitude (V): 11.57
- Apparent dimensions (V): 2.7' × 2.7'

Physical characteristics
- Other designations: NGC 1868, ESO 85-56, KMHK 674, LW 169

NGC 1868 is a globular cluster in the Large Magellanic Cloud in the constellation Dorado. It was discovered by John Herschel in 1834. The cluster is fairly metal-poor and as a result appears relatively blue. It maintains an abundant population of mature giant branch stars which have been used to fit its age to roughly 700 million years old. The cluster is located in a relatively sparse region of the Large Magellanic Cloud which has allowed it to be studied relatively free of crowding from background stars.
