= NGC 1806 =

Globular cluster in the constellation Dorado

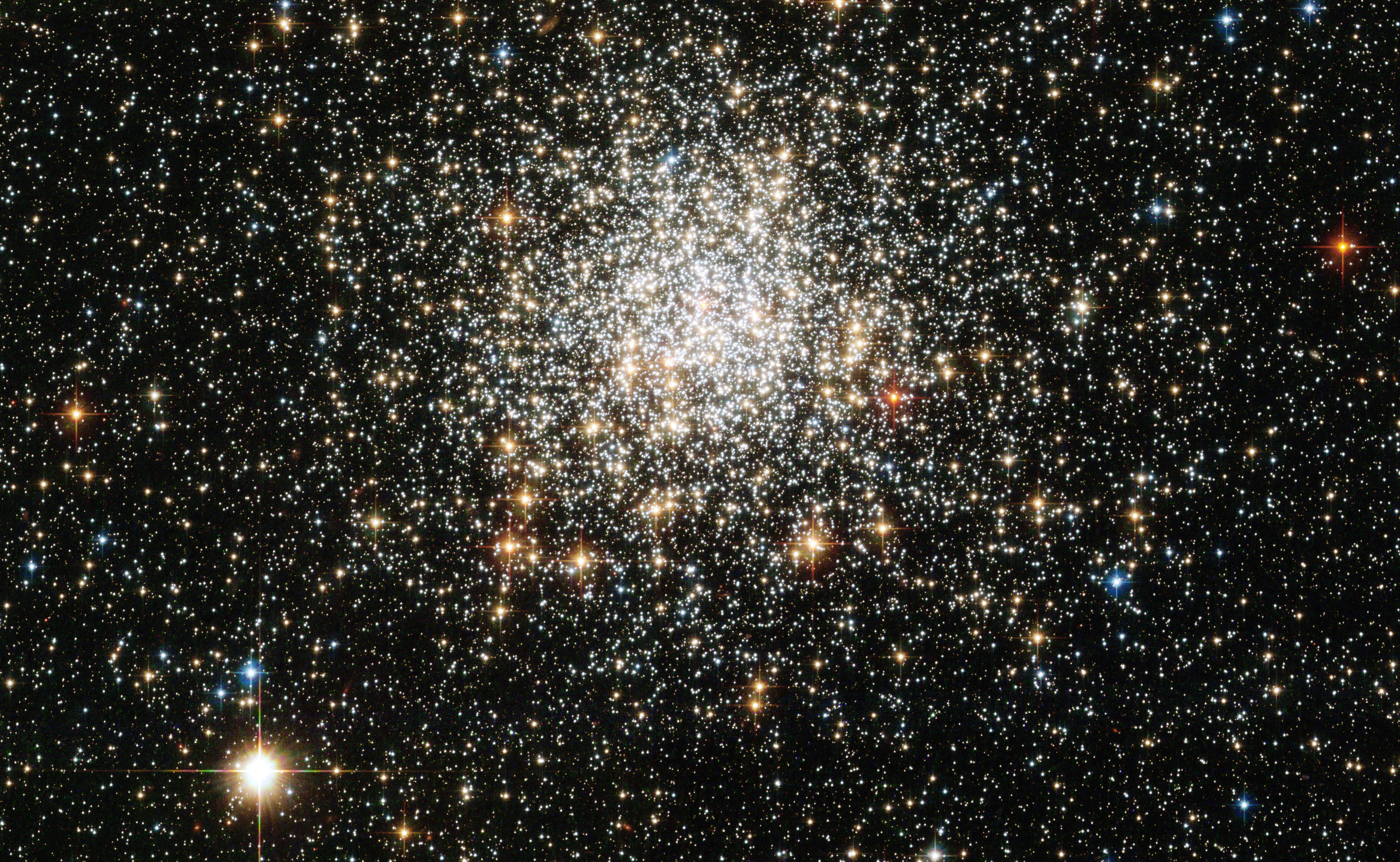
- NGC 1806 image taken by the Hubble Space Telescope

Observation data (J2000 epoch)
- Class: VI
- Constellation: Dorado
- Right ascension: 05^{h} 02^{m} 11.180^{s}
- Declination: −67° 59′ 05.89″
- Apparent magnitude (V): 11.00

Physical characteristics
- Mass: 7.6×10^{4} M_{☉}
- Estimated age: 1.60±0.05 Gyr
- Other designations: NGC 1806, KMHK 462, [SL63] 184

NGC 1806 is a globular cluster located within the Large Magellanic Cloud within the constellation of Dorado (the dolphin-fish), an area of the sky best seen from the Earth's southern hemisphere. It was discovered in 1836 by the British astronomer John Herschel. At an aperture of 50 arcseconds, its apparent V-band magnitude is 11.00, but at this wavelength, it has 0.05 magnitudes of interstellar extinction.

NGC 1806 is about 1.6 billion years old. Its estimated mass is 7.6×10^{4} M_{☉}, and its total luminosity is 1.42×10^{5} L_{☉}, leading to a mass-to-luminosity ratio of 0.54 M_{☉}/L_{☉}. All else equal, older star clusters have higher mass-to-luminosity ratios; that is, they have lower luminosities for the same mass.
