= NGC 6256 =

Globular cluster in the constellation Scorpius

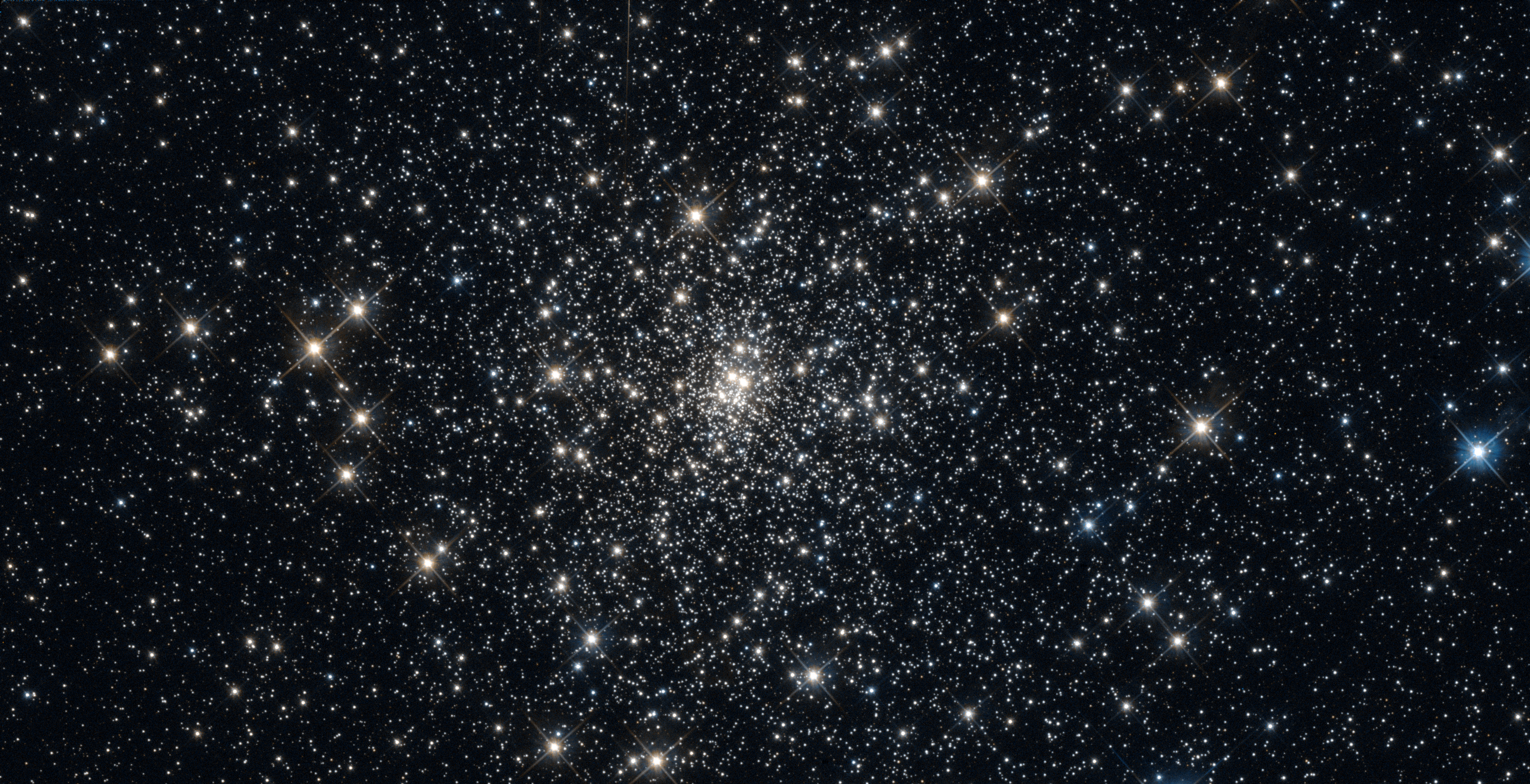
- NGC 6256 as seen through the Hubble Space Telescope

Observation data (J2000 epoch)
- Constellation: Scorpius
- Right ascension: 16^{h} 59^{m} 32.68^{s}
- Declination: −37° 07′ 17.1″
- Distance: 22 kly (6.8 kpc)
- Apparent magnitude (V): 11.3
- Apparent dimensions (V): 7′

Physical characteristics
- Absolute magnitude: −7.15
- Estimated age: 13.0±0.5 Gyr
- Other designations: NGC 6256, GCL 49.1, ESO 391-SC6 and vdB-Hagen 208

NGC 6256 is a globular cluster of stars in the southern constellation of Scorpius. It was discovered by the Scottish astronomer James Dunlop on Aug 2, 1826. In J. L. E. Dreyer's New General Catalogue annotation it is described as, "very faint, very large, very gradually bright in the middle, well resolved clearly consisting of stars." The cluster is located at a distance of 22 thousand light-years (6.8 kpc) from the Sun.

This is an ancient cluster with an estimated age of about 13 billion years; it was formed during the very early stages of assembly of the Milky Way galaxy. The cluster is orbiting within the galactic bulge with a low orbital eccentricity. It is heavily reddened by extinction due to interstellar gas and dust. The structure is very concentrated at the center, showing a post core collapse morphology.

The HR diagram for this cluster displays two sequences of blue straggler stars, which are the products of stellar mergers. The bluer sequence is well-defined and narrow, most likely being generated over a short time span. The redder sequence is more sparse, being the result of a continuous process of formation. It is hypothesized that the bluer sequence was formed around the time of the cluster's core collapse about one billion years ago; an event that made stellar collisions more likely.

The cluster contains a millisecond X-ray pulsar, designated IGR J16597-3704.
