= NGC 6325 =

Globular cluster in the constellation of Ophiuchus

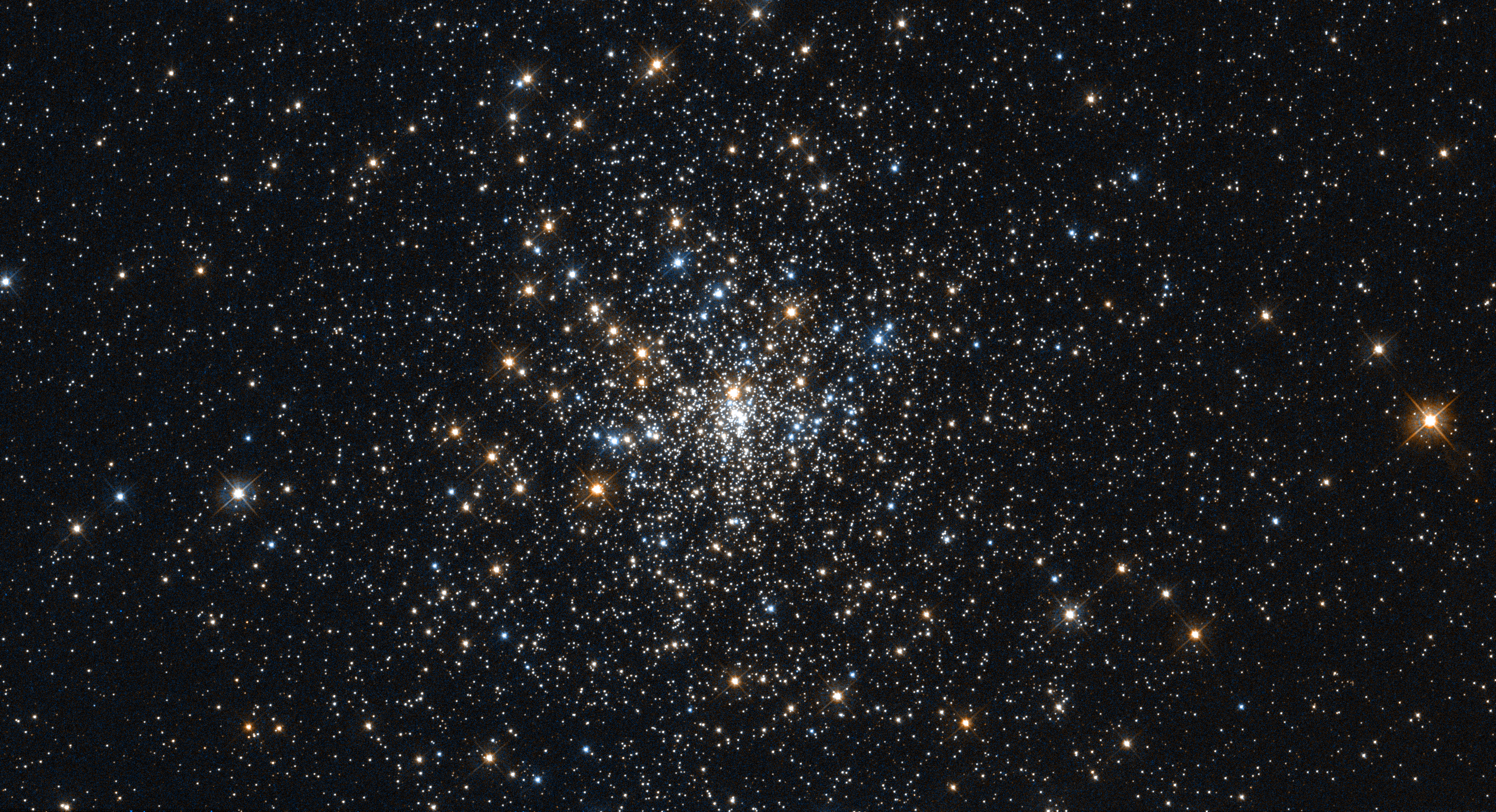
- NGC 6325 as seen through the Hubble Space Telescope

Observation data (J2000 epoch)
- Class: IV
- Constellation: Ophiuchus
- Right ascension: 17^{h} 17^{m} 59.27^{s}
- Declination: −23° 45′ 57.7″
- Distance: 25,400 ly (7,800 pc)
- Apparent magnitude (V): 10.33
- Apparent dimensions (V): 4.3′ × 4.3′

Physical characteristics
- Metallicity: [Fe/H] = -1.25 dex
- Other designations: GCl 58, ESO 519-11

NGC 6325 is a globular cluster located in the constellation Ophiuchus. Its Shapley-Sawyer Concentration Class is IV, meaning that it has "intermediate rich concentration"; it was discovered by the British astronomer John Herschel on 24 May 1835. It is at a distance of about 25,000 light years away from Earth.

== See also ==
- List of NGC objects (6001–7000)
- List of NGC objects
