= NGC 6355 =

Globular cluster in the constellation Ophiuchus

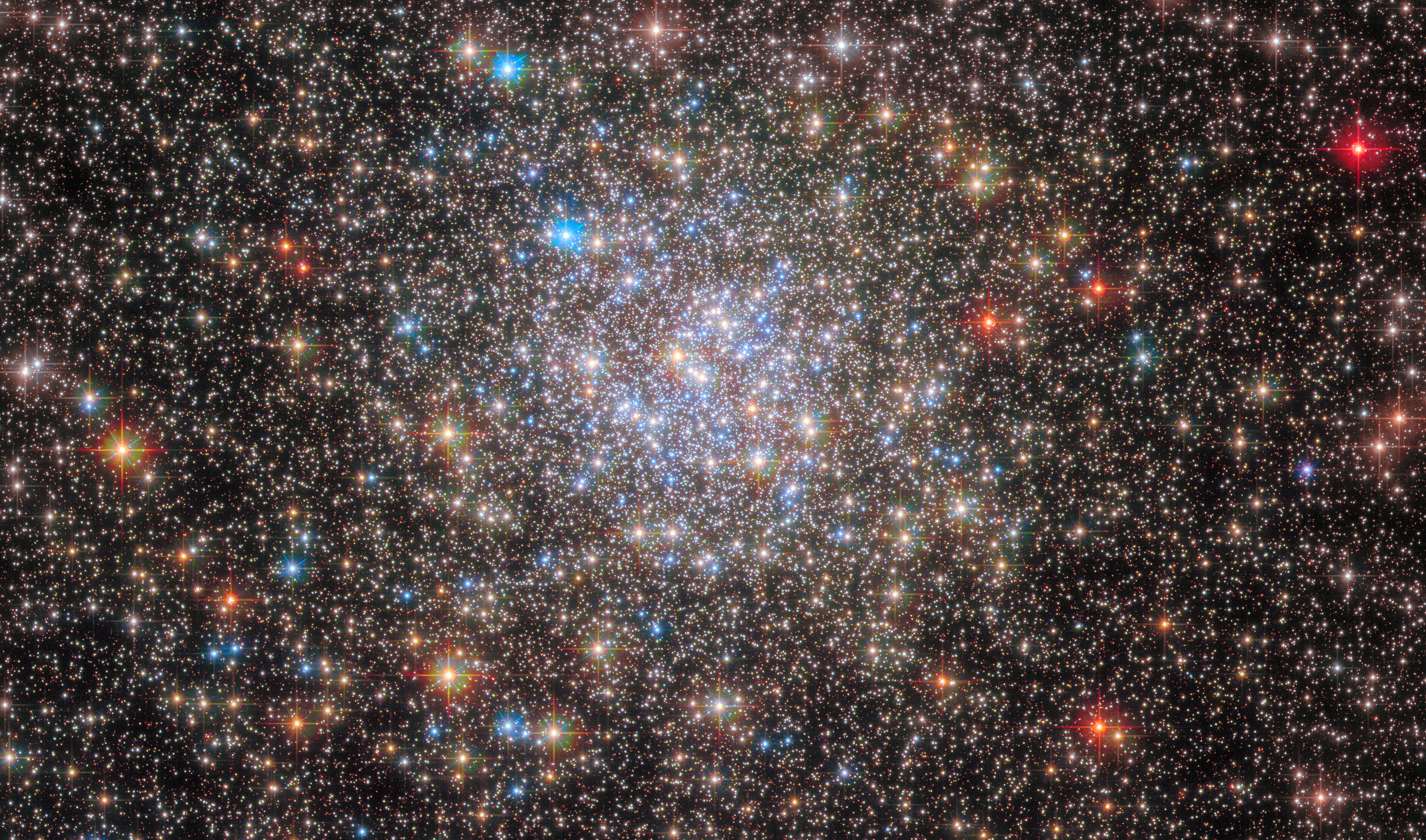
- NGC 6355 seen by Hubble's ACS and WFC3.

Observation data (J2000 epoch)
- Constellation: Ophiuchus
- Right ascension: 17^{h} 23^{m} 58.6^{s}
- Declination: −26° 21′ 12″
- Distance: 8.54 ± 0.19 kpc (27.85 ± 0.62 kly)
- Apparent magnitude (V): 8.6
- Apparent dimensions (V): 4.20

Physical characteristics
- Absolute magnitude: -8.07
- Metallicity: [Fe/H] = −1.39 ± 0.08 dex
- Estimated age: 13.2 ± 1.1 Gyr
- Other designations: Cr 330, GCL 63 and ESO 519-SC15

NGC 6355 is a globular cluster located in the constellation Ophiuchus. It is at a distance of 28,000 light years away from Earth, and is currently part of the Galactic bulge.

NGC was discovered by the German-born British astronomer William Herschel on 24 May 1784. It was initially thought to be an open cluster, but its true nature as a globular cluster was later confirmed. It is a core-collapse cluster.

== See also ==
- List of NGC objects (6001–7000)
- List of NGC objects
