= NGC 2005 =

Globular cluster in the Large Magellanic Cloud

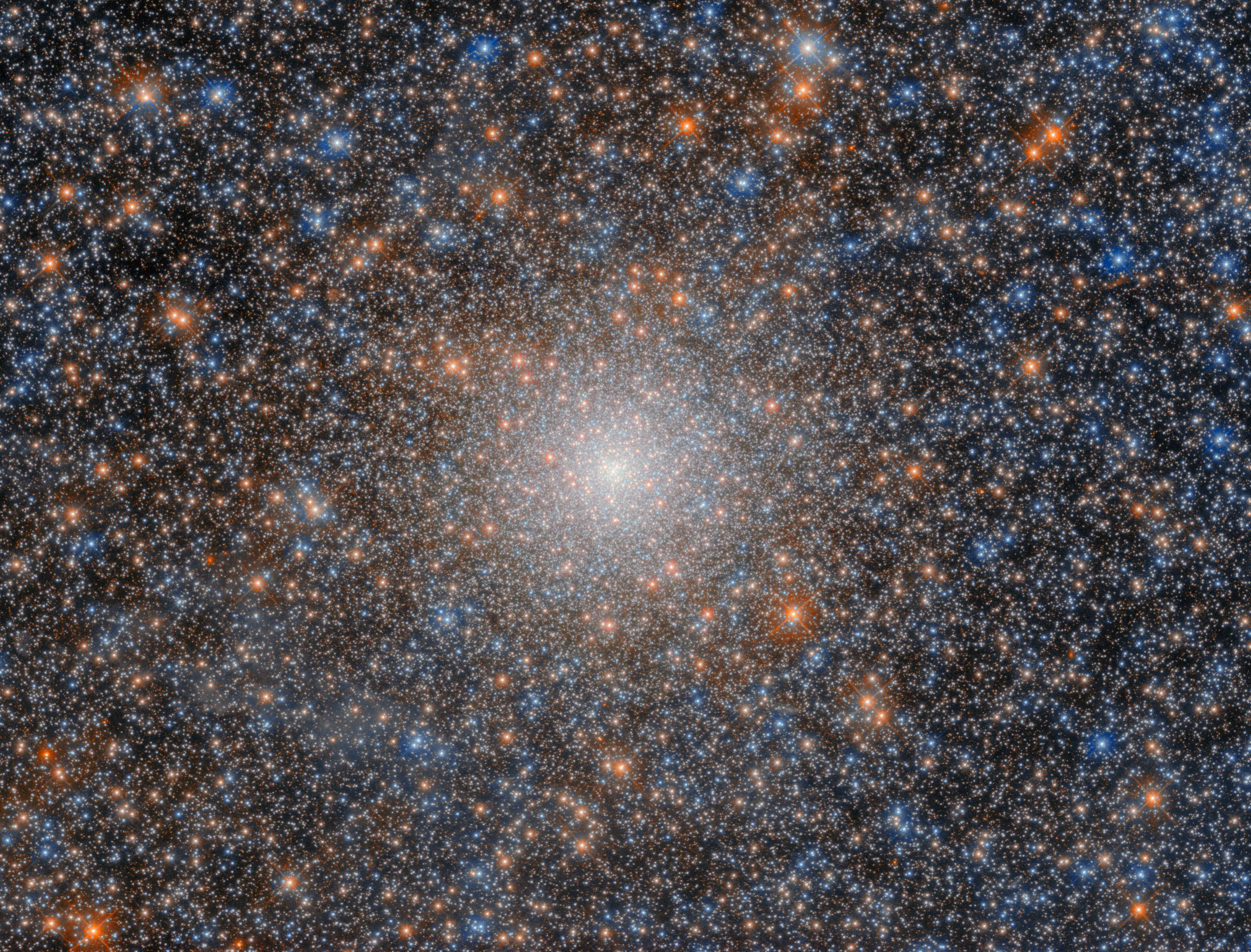
- NGC 2005 as seen by the Hubble Space Telescope

Observation data (J2000 epoch)
- Constellation: Dorado
- Right ascension: 05^{h} 30^{m} 08.5^{s}
- Declination: −69° 45′ 14.42″
- Distance: 162 kly (49.7 kpc)
- Apparent magnitude (V): 11.57
- Apparent dimensions (V): 1.6' × 1.6'

Physical characteristics
- Mass: 170,000 - 560,000 M_{☉}
- Metallicity: [Fe/H] = –1.92 dex
- Estimated age: 13.8 ± 4.9 Gyr
- Other designations: NGC 2005

NGC 2005 is a globular cluster located within the Large Magellanic Cloud in the constellation Dorado.

Compared to other globular clusters of the Large Magellanic Cloud, NGC 2005 has a notably different chemical composition, suggesting it belonged to another galaxy which merged with the LMC at some point in the past. However, this hypothesis has been disputed.
