= NGC 6558 =

Globular cluster in the constellation of Sagittarius

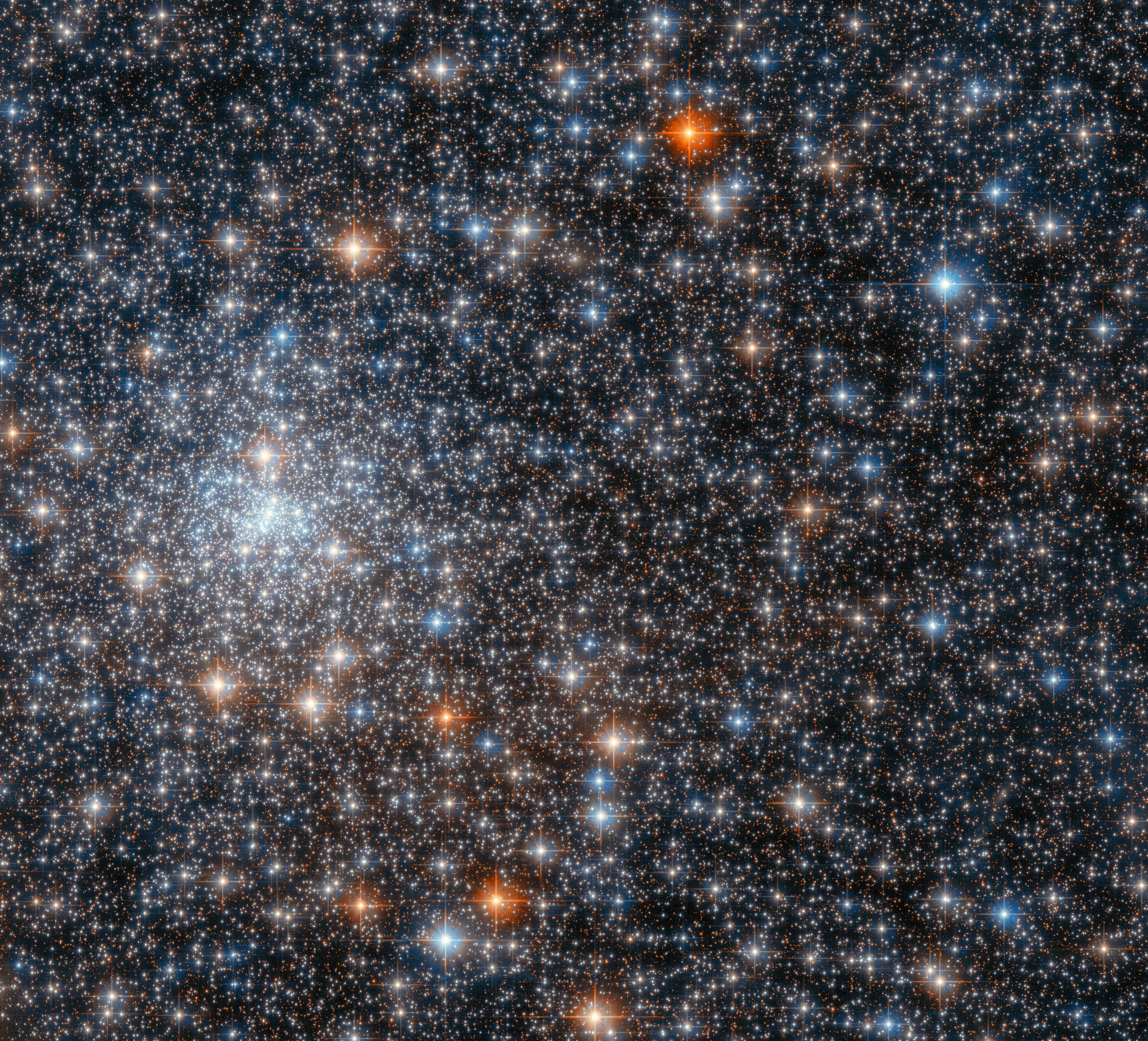
- The globular cluster NGC 6558 imaged by the Hubble Space Telescope

Observation data (J2000 epoch)
- Class: V
- Constellation: Sagittarius
- Right ascension: 18^{h} 10^{m} 18.38^{s}
- Declination: −31° 45′ 48.6″
- Distance: 24.1 kly (7.4 kpc)
- Apparent magnitude (V): 11.29

Physical characteristics
- Radius: 5.2' x 5.2'
- Metallicity: [Fe/H] = −1.32 dex
- Other designations: Cr 368, GCl 89, ESO 456-62, VDBH 259

NGC 6558 is a globular cluster, located about 24,000 (Note: The central value in the range is 7.3 kiloparsecs (24,000 ly).) light years away in the constellation Sagittarius. Its apparent magnitude is about 11 and its apparent diameter is about 10 arcminutes. The globular cluster was discovered in 1784 by the astronomer William Herschel with his 18.7-inch telescope and the discovery was later catalogued in the New General Catalogue.

It is located 1.5 degrees south-southeast of Gamma^{2} Sagittarii.
