= NGC 7492 =

Globular cluster in the constellation Aquarius

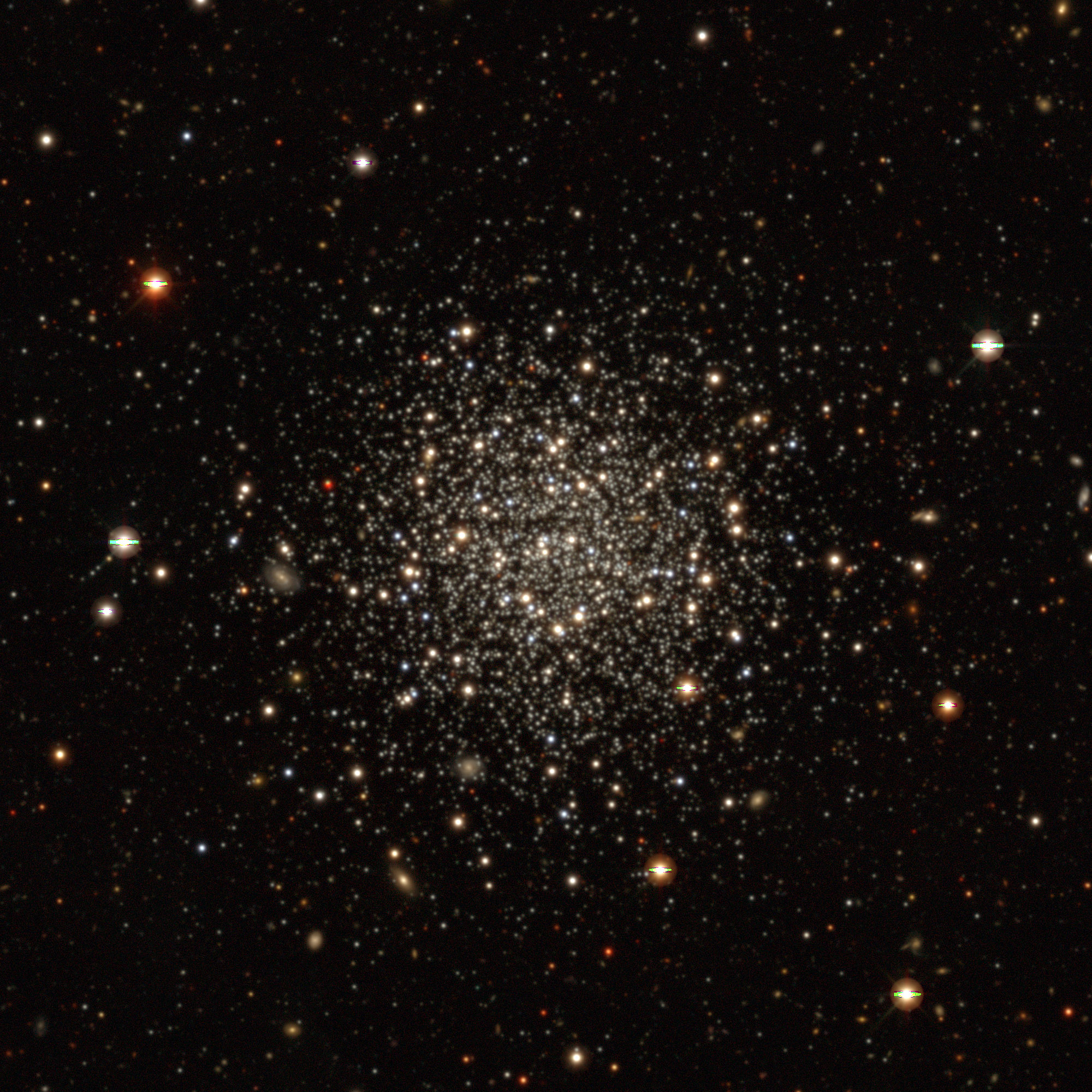
- NGC 7492 with legacy surveys

Observation data (J2000 epoch)
- Class: XII
- Constellation: Aquarius
- Right ascension: 23^{h} 08^{m} 26.7^{s}
- Declination: −15° 36′ 39″
- Distance: 24,500 kpc (80,000×10^{3} ly)
- Apparent magnitude (V): 11.2
- Apparent dimensions (V): 4.2′

Physical characteristics
- Absolute magnitude: 0.38±0.04
- Metallicity: [Fe/H] = -1.69 dex
- Estimated age: 12 Gyr
- Other designations: GCl 125, MWSC 3705

NGC 7492 is a globular cluster in the constellation Aquarius. It was discovered by the astronomer William Herschel on September 20, 1786. It resides in the outskirts of the Milky Way, about 80,000 light-years away, more than twice the distance between the Sun and the center of the galaxy, and is a benchmark member of the outer galactic halo. The cluster is immersed in, but does not kinematically belong to, the Sagittarius Stream.

NGC 7492 possess a tidal tail 3.5 degrees long, embedded into an over-density of stars which may be the remnants of a disrupted dwarf galaxy. The shape of the cluster is flattened rather than spherical, likely due to dynamical interaction with the Milky Way.
