= 47 Tucanae =

Globular cluster in the constellation Tucana

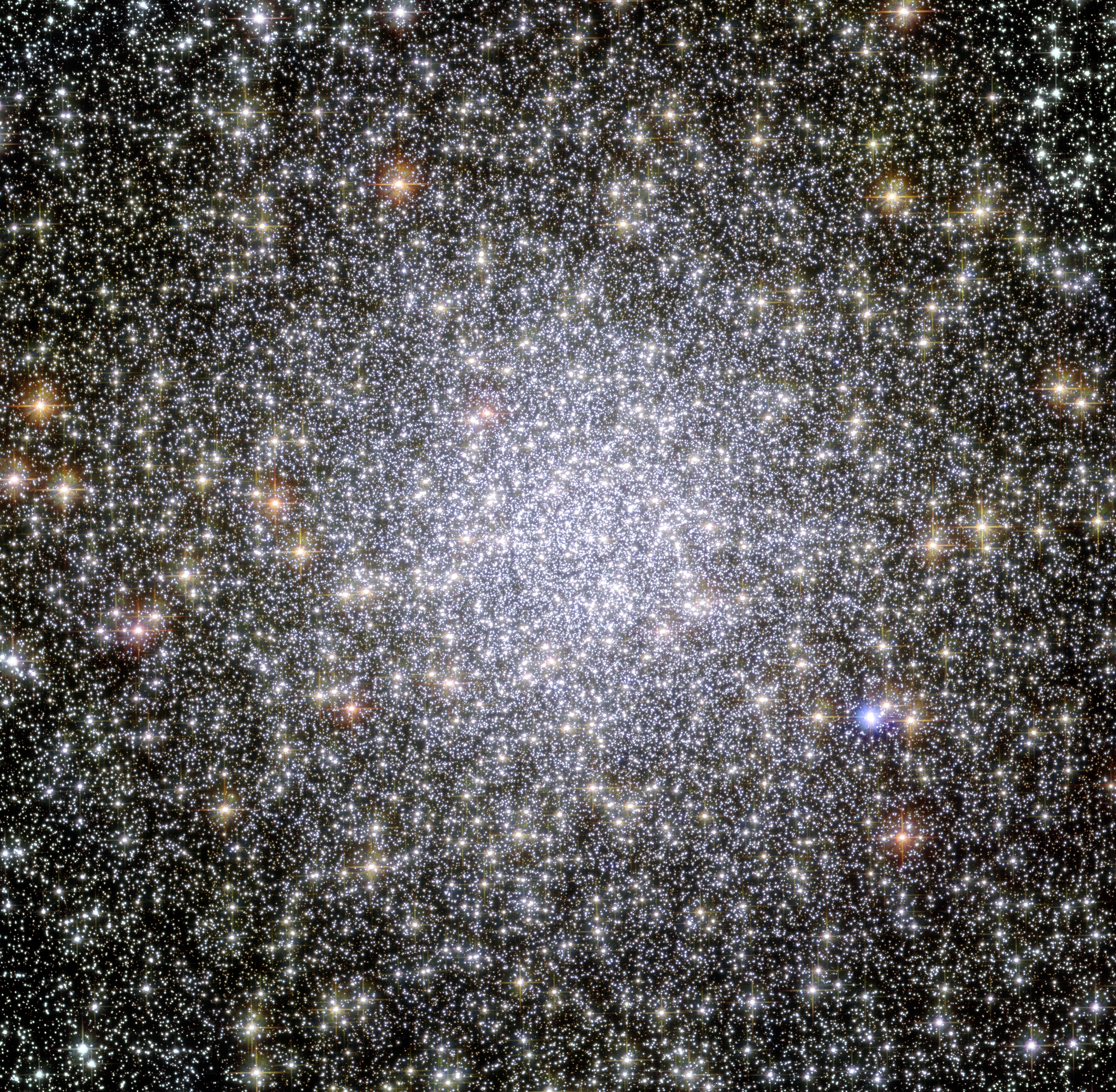
- After Omega Centauri, 47 Tucanae is the brightest globular cluster in the night sky.

Observation data (J2000 epoch)
- Class: III
- Constellation: Tucana
- Right ascension: 00^{h} 24^{m} 05.539^{s}
- Declination: −72° 04′ 53.20″
- Distance: 4.45 ± 0.01 kpc (14,500 ± 32.6 ly)
- Apparent magnitude (V): +4.09
- Apparent dimensions (V): 43.8′

Physical characteristics
- Mass: 7.00×10^{5} M_{☉}
- Radius: 60 ly
- V_{HB}: 14.2
- Metallicity: [Fe/H] = −0.78 dex
- Estimated age: 13.06 Gyr
- Notable features: 2nd brightest globular cluster after Omega Centauri
- Other designations: ξ Tuc, NGC 104, Caldwell 106, Mel 1, GCl 1, 1RXS J002404.6-720456

47 Tucanae (47 Tuc, also designated NGC 104 and Caldwell 106) is a globular cluster located in the constellation of Tucana. It is about 4.45 ± 0.01 kpc (14,500 ± 32.6 ly) from Earth, and 120 light years in diameter. 47 Tuc can be seen with the naked eye, with an apparent magnitude of 4.1. It appears about 44 arcminutes across including its far outreaches. Due to its far southern location, 18° from the south celestial pole, it was not catalogued by European astronomers until the 1750s, when the cluster was first identified by Nicolas-Louis de Lacaille from South Africa.

47 Tucanae is the second brightest globular cluster after Omega Centauri, and telescopically reveals about ten thousand stars, many appearing within a small dense central core. The cluster may contain an intermediate-mass black hole.

== Early history ==
The cluster was recorded in 1751–2 by Nicolas-Louis de Lacaille, who initially thought it was the nucleus of a bright comet. Lacaille then listed it as "Lac I-1", the first object listed in his deep-sky catalogue. The number "47" was assigned in Allgemeine Beschreibung und Nachweisung der Gestirne nebst Verzeichniss ("General description and verification of the stars and indexes"), compiled by Johann Elert Bode and published in Berlin in 1801. Bode did not observe this cluster himself, but had reordered Lacaille's catalogued stars by constellation in order of right ascension.

In the 19th century, Benjamin Apthorp Gould assigned the Greek letter ξ (Xi) to the cluster to designate it ξ Tucanae, but this was not widely adopted and it is almost universally referred to as 47 Tucanae.

== Characteristics ==
47 Tucanae is the second brightest globular cluster in the sky (after Omega Centauri), and is noted for having a small very bright and dense core. It is one of the most massive globular clusters in the Galaxy, containing millions of stars. The cluster appears roughly the size of the full moon in the sky under ideal conditions. Though it appears adjacent to the Small Magellanic Cloud, the latter is some 60.6 ± 1.0 kpc (200,000 ± 3,300 ly) distant, being over fifteen times farther than 47 Tuc.

The core of 47 Tuc was the subject of a major survey for planets, using the Hubble Space Telescope to look for partial eclipses of stars by their planets. No planets were found, though ten to fifteen were expected based on the rate of planet discoveries around stars near the Sun. This indicates that planets are relatively rare in globular clusters. A later ground-based survey in the uncrowded outer regions of the cluster also failed to detect planets when several were expected. This strongly indicates that the low metallicity of the environment, rather than the crowding, is responsible.

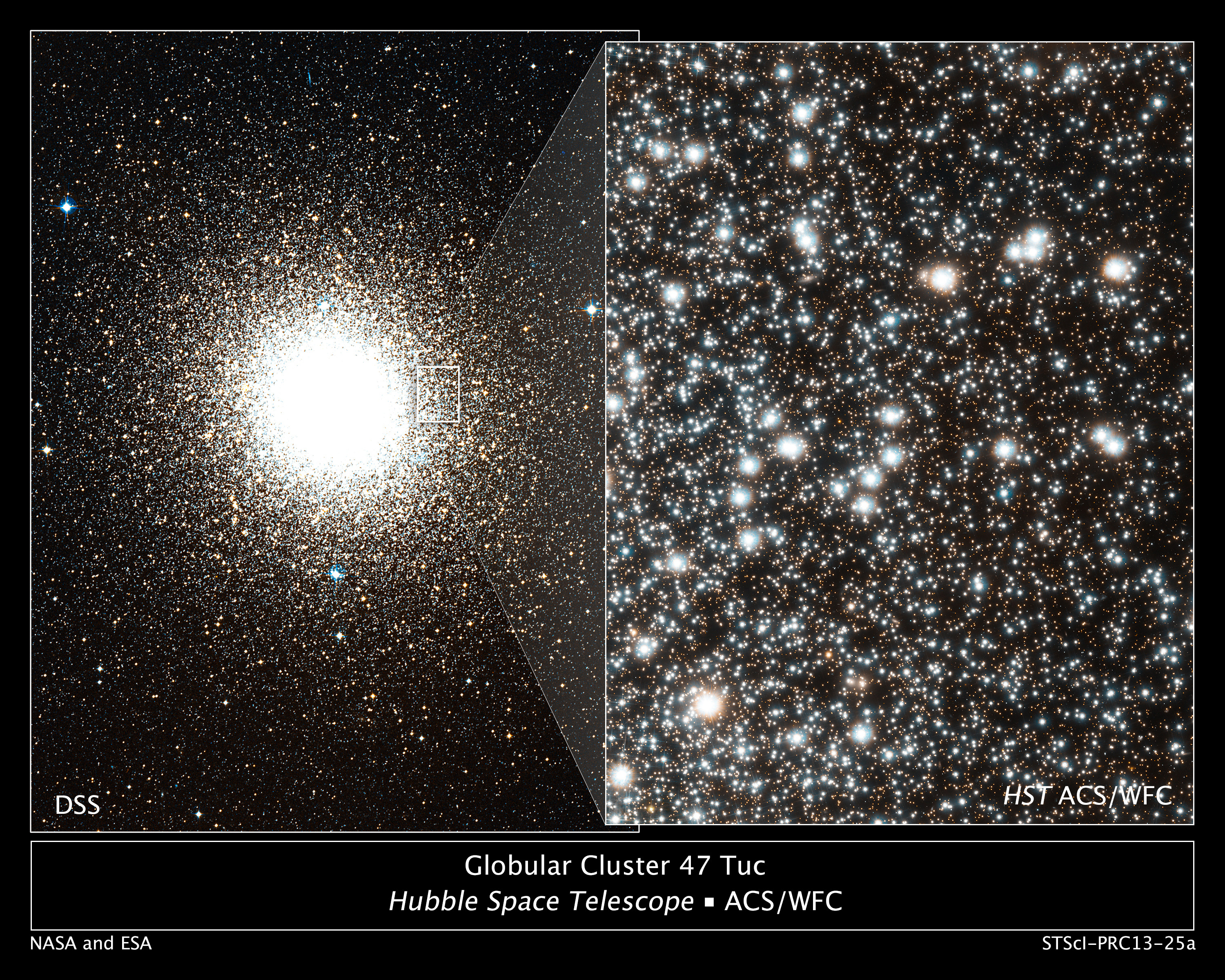
Multiple stellar populations in 47 Tucanae

47 Tucanae contains at least two stellar populations of stars, of different ages or metallicities. The dense core contains a number of exotic stars of scientific interest, including at least 21 blue stragglers. Globular clusters efficiently sort stars by mass, with the most massive stars falling to the center.

47 Tucanae contains hundreds of X-ray sources, including stars with enhanced chromospheric activity due to their presence in binary star systems, cataclysmic variable stars containing white dwarfs accreting from companion stars and low-mass X-ray binaries containing neutron stars that are not currently accreting, but can be observed by the X-rays emitted from the hot surface of the neutron star. 47 Tucanae has 35 known millisecond pulsars, the second largest population of pulsars in any globular cluster, after Terzan 5. These pulsars are thought to be spun up by the accretion of material from binary companion stars, in a previous X-ray binary phase. The companion of one pulsar in 47 Tucanae, 47 Tuc W, seems to still be transferring mass towards its companion, indicating that this system is completing a transition from being an accreting low-mass X-ray binary to a millisecond pulsar. X-ray emission has been individually detected from most millisecond pulsars in 47 Tucanae with the Chandra X-ray Observatory, likely emission from the neutron star surface, and gamma-ray emission has been detected with the Fermi Gamma-ray Space Telescope from its millisecond pulsar population (making 47 Tucanae the first globular cluster to be detected in gamma-rays).

The cluster's brightest star in visible and ultraviolet light is a blue giant star with a spectral class of B8III and with a luminosity of about 1,100 times that of the Sun. Aptly known as the "Bright Star", it is a post-AGB star, having passed the asymptotic giant branch phase of its life, and is currently fusing helium. It has an effective temperature of about 10,850 K, and is about 54% the mass of the Sun.

=== Possible central black hole ===
It is not yet clear whether 47 Tucanae hosts a central black hole. Hubble Space Telescope data constrain the mass of any possible black hole at the cluster's center to be less than approximately 1,500 solar masses. However, in February, 2017, astronomers announced that a black hole of some 2,200 solar masses may be located in the cluster; the researchers detected the black hole's signature from the motions and distributions of pulsars in the cluster. Despite this, a recent analysis of an updated and more extensive timing data set on these pulsars provides no solid evidence in favor of the existence of a black hole.

== Modern discoveries ==
In December 2008, Ragbir Bhathal of the University of Western Sydney claimed the detection of a strong laser-like signal from the direction of 47 Tucanae.

In May 2015, the first evidence of the process of mass segregation in this globular cluster was announced. The cluster's Hertzsprung–Russell diagram suggests stars approximately 13 billion years old, which is unusually old.

In January 2024, a team of astronomers led by Western Australia's International Centre for Radio Astronomy Research (ICRAR) detected a previously undetected radio source at the heart of 47 Tucanae, which could be a supermassive black hole.
