= List of most massive star clusters =

Most massive known star clusters

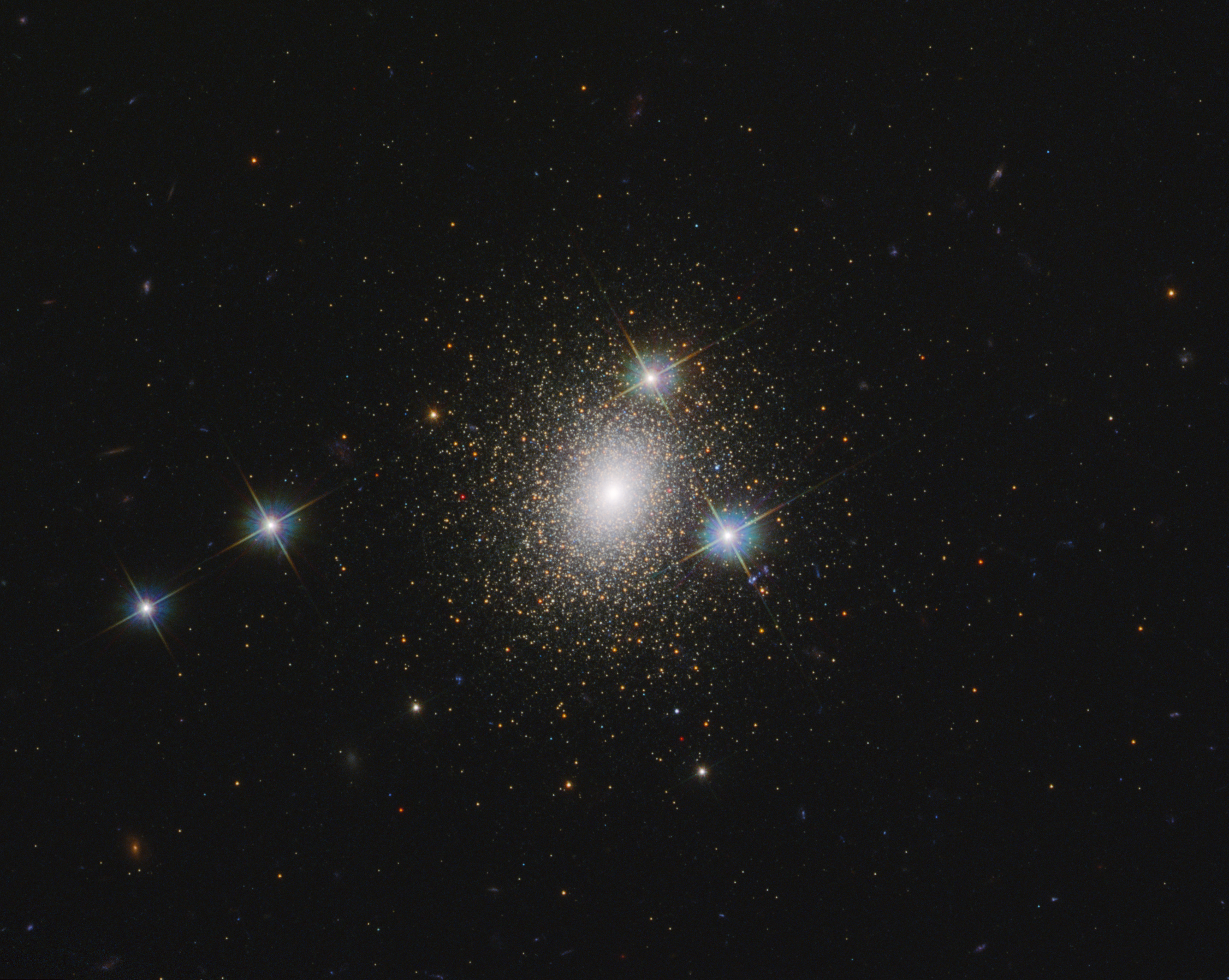
Mayall II, currently considered to be among the most massive star clusters.

Below are lists of the most massive known star clusters in solar masses (M_{☉}) and sorted in descending order.

== Methods for mass estimation ==
=== Globular cluster ===
Globular cluster masses can be determined by observing the proper motion of nearby stars influenced by the cluster or by estimating the cluster's relaxation time.

=== Open clusters ===
The masses of open star clusters can be estimated by measuring the falloff of radial and tangential velocities of surrounding stars at a particular distance.

== List ==
=== Globular clusters ===
List of most massive globular clusters
Cluster name	Mass (M_{☉}); (Sun = 1×10^{0})	Galaxy	Notes
[BHK2005] 326 (Note: The article states that the star clusters over 10^{8} are likely multiple clusters, and therefore are not added to the list.)	5.50×10^{7}	Condor Galaxy	
[DBT2008] NGC 4571 5	4.68×10^{7}	NGC 4571	
[DBT2008] NGC 4449 398	3.89×10^{7}	NGC 4449	
[BHK2005] 311	3.63×10^{7}	Condor Galaxy	
[BHK2005] 53	3.63×10^{7}	Condor Galaxy	
[DBT2008] NGC 5457 1102	2.82×10^{7}	Pinwheel Galaxy	
[BHK2005] 347	2.29×10^{7}	Condor Galaxy	
[DBT2008] NGC 4713 2	2.09×10^{7}	NGC 4713	
[BHK2005] 76	1.62×10^{7}	Condor Galaxy	
[BHK2005] 14	1.58×10^{7}	Condor Galaxy	
[DBT2008] NGC 5457 3	1.38×10^{7}	Pinwheel Galaxy	
[BHK2005] 315	1.35×10^{7}	Condor Galaxy	
[BHK2005] 320	1.35×10^{7}	Condor Galaxy	
[BHK2005] 118	1.20×10^{7}	Condor Galaxy	
[BHK2005] 338	1.17×10^{7}	Condor Galaxy	
B037-V327	1.08+0.17 −0.049×10^{7}	Andromeda Galaxy	
[BHK2005] 331	1.05×10^{7}	Condor Galaxy	
[BHK2005] 352	1.02×10^{7}	Condor Galaxy	
Mayall II	≳1×10^{7}	Andromeda Galaxy	
[BHK2005] 2	7.76×10^{6}	Condor Galaxy	
Markarian 71	7.24×10^{6}	NGC 2366	
[DBT2008] NGC 5457 691	6.61×10^{6}	Pinwheel Galaxy	
B082-G144	6.42+0.16 −0.38×10^{6}	Andromeda Galaxy	
B023-G078	6.22+0.03 −0.05×10^{6}	Andromeda Galaxy	Potentially contains an intermediate-mass black hole of 9.1+2.6 −2.8×10^{4} M_{☉}.
B127-G185	5.31+0.28 −0.40×10^{6}	Andromeda Galaxy	
[DBT2008] NGC 4571 4	5.25×10^{6}	NGC 4571	
[BHK2005] 64	5.25×10^{6}	Condor Galaxy	
[BHK2005] 206	5.13×10^{6}	Condor Galaxy	
[BHK2005] 227	5.13×10^{6}	Condor Galaxy	
[DBT2008] NGC 5457 658	4.90×10^{6}	Pinwheel Galaxy	
[DBT2008] DDO 165 16	4.79×10^{6}	DDO 165	
[DBT2008] NGC 5457 1033	4.79×10^{6}	Pinwheel Galaxy	
[BHK2005] 210	4.57×10^{6}	Condor Galaxy	
[BHK2005] 303	4.57×10^{6}	Condor Galaxy	
B151-G205	4.36+0.16 −0.20×10^{6}	Andromeda Galaxy	
G001-MII	4.24+0.99 −0.58×10^{6}	Andromeda Galaxy	
B225-G280	4.20+0.32 −0.35×10^{6}	Andromeda Galaxy	
ω Centauri	(3.94±0.02)×10^{6}	Milky Way	Most massive star cluster in the Milky Way.
[DBT2008] NGC 5457 643	3.89×10^{6}	Pinwheel Galaxy	
[BHK2005] 257	3.57×10^{6}	Condor Galaxy	
[DBT2008] NGC 5457 1149	3.16×10^{6}	Pinwheel Galaxy	
B129	3.12+0.11 −0.13×10^{6}	Andromeda Galaxy	
B088-G150	2.86+0.33 −0.14×10^{6}	Andromeda Galaxy	
B163-G217	2.72+0.11 −0.092×10^{6}	Andromeda Galaxy	
[DBT2008] NGC 4713 11	2.69×10^{6}	NGC 4713	
[DBT2008] NGC 2552 17	2.69×10^{6}	NGC 2552	
[BHK2005] 374	2.69×10^{6}	Condor Galaxy	
[BHK2005] 248	2.63×10^{6}	Condor Galaxy	
B042-G104	2.62+0.30 −0.15×10^{6}	Andromeda Galaxy	
[DBT2008] NGC 5457 247	2.51×10^{6}	Pinwheel Galaxy	
B338-G076	2.49+0.28 −0.46×10^{6}	Andromeda Galaxy	
[BHK2005] 264	2.45×10^{6}	Condor Galaxy	
[BHK2005] 229	2.40×10^{6}	Condor Galaxy	
[BHK2005] 258	2.40×10^{6}	Condor Galaxy	
[DBT2008] NGC 4713 100	2.34×10^{6}	NGC 4713	
B158-G213	2.28+0.25 −0.15×10^{6}	Andromeda Galaxy	
[BHK2005] 241	2.14×10^{6}	Condor Galaxy	
[BHK2005] 301	2.14×10^{6}	Condor Galaxy	
[BHK2005] 282	2.04×10^{6}	Condor Galaxy	
B103-G165	2.02+0.13 −0.17×10^{6}	Andromeda Galaxy	
[BHK2005] 369	2.00×10^{6}	Condor Galaxy	
B193-G244	1.96+0.086 −0.065×10^{6}	Andromeda Galaxy	
[DBT2008] NGC 4713 63	1.95×10^{6}	NGC 4713	
[BHK2005] 354	1.95×10^{6}	Condor Galaxy	
B063-G124	1.93+0.27 −0.25×10^{6}	Andromeda Galaxy	
B019-G072	1.89+0.26 −0.10×10^{6}	Andromeda Galaxy	
[DBT2008] NGC 4485 49	1.86×10^{6}	NGC 4485	
B171-G222	1.84+0.16 −0.083×10^{6}	Andromeda Galaxy	
B039-G101	1.81+0.23 −0.16×10^{6}	Andromeda Galaxy	
[DBT2008] NGC 5457 47	1.78×10^{6}	Pinwheel Galaxy	
HK NGC 2403 221	1.75×10^{6}	NGC 2403	
[BHK2005] 304	1.74×10^{6}	Condor Galaxy	
[BHK2005] 93	1.70×10^{6}	Condor Galaxy	
[BHK2005] 176	1.70×10^{6}	Condor Galaxy	
B306-G029	1.67+0.21 −0.11×10^{6}	Andromeda Galaxy	
[BHK2005] 224	1.66×10^{6}	Condor Galaxy	
B218-G272	1.64+0.27 −0.18×10^{6}	Andromeda Galaxy	
B124-NB10	1.60+0.52 −0.55×10^{6}	Andromeda Galaxy	
MITA140	1.57+0.14 −0.15×10^{6}	Andromeda Galaxy	
[DBT2008] NGC 4485 453	1.55×10^{6}	NGC 4485	
[DBT2008] NGC 5457 1029	1.55×10^{6}	Pinwheel Galaxy	
B091D-D058	1.54+0.094 −0.11×10^{6}	Andromeda Galaxy	
[DBT2008] NGC 5457 1120	1.51×10^{6}	Pinwheel Galaxy	
B020-G073	1.51+0.21 −0.16×10^{6}	Andromeda Galaxy	
B116-G178	1.45+0.16 −0.073×10^{6}	Andromeda Galaxy	
[DBT2008] NGC 4713 50	1.44×10^{6}	NGC 4713	
[DBT2008] NGC 4713 9	1.44×10^{6}	NGC 4713	
[DBT2008] NGC 4485 101	1.44×10^{6}	NGC 4485	
B182-G233	1.41+0.20 −0.24×10^{6}	Andromeda Galaxy	
Messier 54	(1.41±0.002)×10^{6}	Milky Way	
[DBT2008] NGC 5457 120	1.38×10^{6}	Pinwheel Galaxy	
[BHK2005] 155	1.38×10^{6}	Condor Galaxy	
B094-G156	1.38+0.10 −0.11×10^{6}	Andromeda Galaxy	
[DBT2008] NGC 4713 27	1.35×10^{6}	NGC 4713	
B174-G226	1.36+0.15 −0.19×10^{6}	Andromeda Galaxy	
B147-G199	1.34+0.038 −0.041×10^{6}	Andromeda Galaxy	
B055-G116	1.32+0.073 −0.085×10^{6}	Andromeda Galaxy	
B006-G058	1.31+0.10 −0.049×10^{6}	Andromeda Galaxy	
[BHK2005] 319	1.29×10^{6}	Condor Galaxy	
B178-G229	1.28+0.20 −0.21×10^{6}	Andromeda Galaxy	
B206-G257	1.27+0.21 −0.29×10^{6}	Andromeda Galaxy	
B068-G130	1.26+0.13 −0.10×10^{6}	Andromeda Galaxy	
B311-G033	1.24+0.074 −0.14×10^{6}	Andromeda Galaxy	
[DBT2008] NGC 5457 706	1.23×10^{6}	Pinwheel Galaxy	
[BHK2005] 172	1.23×10^{6}	Condor Galaxy	
B034-G096	1.23+0.21 −0.092×10^{6}	Andromeda Galaxy	
B012-G064	1.23+0.088 −0.14×10^{6}	Andromeda Galaxy	
NGC 6441	(1.23±0.001)×10^{6}	Milky Way	
B110-G172	1.22+0.17 −0.12×10^{6}	Andromeda Galaxy	
[BHK2005] 346	1.20×10^{6}	Condor Galaxy	
[DBT2008] NGC 4656 188	1.17×10^{6}	Hockey Stick Galaxies	
[BHK2005] 231	1.17×10^{6}	Condor Galaxy	
B005-G052	1.16+0.22 −0.094×10^{6}	Andromeda Galaxy	
B051-G114	1.15+0.19 −0.10×10^{6}	Andromeda Galaxy	
B086-G148	1.14+0.071 −0.10×10^{6}	Andromeda Galaxy	
[DBT2008] NGC 5457 782	1.12×10^{6}	Pinwheel Galaxy	
[BHK2005] 212	1.12×10^{6}	Condor Galaxy	
B472-D064	1.12+0.14 −0.12×10^{6}	Andromeda Galaxy	
B312-G035	1.12+0.18 −0.18×10^{6}	Andromeda Galaxy	
B017-G070	1.11+0.14 −0.12×10^{6}	Andromeda Galaxy	
B240-G302	1.11+0.17 −0.15×10^{6}	Andromeda Galaxy	
[DBT2008] NGC 5457 596	1.10×10^{6}	Pinwheel Galaxy	
[BHK2005] 385	1.10×10^{6}	Condor Galaxy	
B072	1.08+0.13 −0.083×10^{6}	Andromeda Galaxy	
B112-G174	1.08+0.078 −0.057×10^{6}	Andromeda Galaxy	
B405-G351	1.08+0.20 −0.18×10^{6}	Andromeda Galaxy	
[DBT2008] IC 3521 1	1.07×10^{6}	IC 3521	
[BHK2005] 276	1.07×10^{6}	Condor Galaxy	
B373-G305	1.07+0.22 −0.10×10^{6}	Andromeda Galaxy	
B058-G119	1.06+0.13 −0.17×10^{6}	Andromeda Galaxy	
NGC 6388	(1.06±0.001)×10^{6}	Milky Way	
[DBT2008] NGC 5457 228	1.05×10^{6}	Pinwheel Galaxy	
B224-G279	1.05+0.11 −0.085×10^{6}	Andromeda Galaxy	
B096-G158	1.04+0.067 −0.061×10^{6}	Andromeda Galaxy	
B185-G235	1.03+0.11 −0.070×10^{6}	Andromeda Galaxy	
[DBT2008] NGC 5457 287	1.00×10^{6}	Pinwheel Galaxy	
[BHK2005] 222	1.00×10^{6}	Condor Galaxy	
[RBF2020] NGC 2403 AS053	1.00×10^{6}	NGC 2403	
NGC 2419	(9.81±1.42)×10^{5}	None	
B179-G230	9.78+1.33 −1.43×10^{5}	Andromeda Galaxy	
[BHK2005] 173	9.77×10^{5}	Condor Galaxy	
NGC 2808	9.73+0.04 −0.04×10^{6}	Milky Way	
Messier 3	9.57×10^{5}	Milky Way	
B143-G198	9.55+0.31 −0.36×10^{5}	Andromeda Galaxy	
B027-G087	9.54+1.35 −1.08×10^{5}	Andromeda Galaxy	
MGC1	9.54+1.35 −1.08×10^{5}	None	
EXT8	9.40+0.34 −0.31×10^{5}	Andromeda Galaxy	
[DBT2008] NGC 5457 76	9.33×10^{5}	Pinwheel Galaxy	
[BHK2005] 268	9.33×10^{5}	Condor Galaxy	
B204-G254	9.22+0.48 −0.71×10^{5}	Andromeda Galaxy	
B205-G256	9.16+1.74 −1.57×10^{5}	Andromeda Galaxy	
[DBT2008] NGC 5457 709	9.12×10^{5}	Pinwheel Galaxy	
[DBT2008] NGC 4713 24	9.12×10^{5}	NGC 4713	
[BHK2005] 447	9.12×10^{5}	Condor Galaxy	
B045-G108	9.06+1.29 −0.60×10^{5}	Andromeda Galaxy	
B135-G192	9.04+0.93 −0.80×10^{5}	Andromeda Galaxy	
B061-G122	8.98+1.26 −0.75×10^{5}	Andromeda Galaxy	
B131-G189	8.85+2.93 −1.32×10^{5}	Andromeda Galaxy	
B383-G318	8.80+1.13 −0.90×10^{5}	Andromeda Galaxy	
B381-G315	8.69+1.34 −0.66×10^{5}	Andromeda Galaxy	
B212-G263	8.62+0.81 −0.68×10^{5}	Andromeda Galaxy	
B107-G169	8.59+1.04 −1.32×10^{5}	Andromeda Galaxy	
Messier 5	8.57×10^{5}	Milky Way	
B183-G234	8.24+0.88 −0.82×10^{5}	Andromeda Galaxy	
B384-G319	8.21+0.41 −0.60×10^{5}	Andromeda Galaxy	
[DBT2008] NGC 4485 136	8.13×10^{5}	NGC 4485	
NGC 6440	8.11×10^{5}	Milky Way	
B232-G286	8.01+0.91 −0.39×10^{5}	Andromeda Galaxy	
[DBT2008] NGC 2552 8	7.94×10^{5}	NGC 2552	
B122-G181	7.88+1.34 −0.72×10^{5}	Andromeda Galaxy	
B073-G134	7.80+0.53 −0.64×10^{5}	Andromeda Galaxy	
NGC 5824	(7.79±0.42)×10^{5}	Milky Way	
[DBT2008] NGC 5457 100	7.76×10^{5}	Pinwheel Galaxy	
Messier 13	7.75×10^{5}	Milky Way	
B386-G322	7.74+2.31 −1.69×10^{5}	Andromeda Galaxy	
Messier 14	(7.74±0.61)×10^{5}	Milky Way	
B106-G168	7.54+0.54 −0.52×10^{5}	Andromeda Galaxy	
B313-G036	7.41+1.34 −1.01×10^{5}	Andromeda Galaxy	
[DBT2008] NGC 5457 1200	7.24×10^{5}	Pinwheel Galaxy	
[DBT2008] NGC 4713 97	7.24×10^{5}	NGC 4713	
NGC 5286	7.13×10^{5}	Milky Way	
B030-G091	7.10+0.32 −0.39×10^{5}	Andromeda Galaxy	
ξ Tucanae (47 Tucanae)	7.10×10^{5}	Milky Way	
[BHK2005] 232	7.08×10^{5}	Condor Galaxy	
Messier 62	(7.07±0.05)×10^{5}	Milky Way	
PA53	6.93+1.47 −0.81×10^{5}	Andromeda Galaxy	
[DBT2008] NGC 5457 624	6.92×10^{5}	Pinwheel Galaxy	
[DBT2008] NGC 4713 72	6.92×10^{5}	NGC 4713	
[BHK2005] 456	6.92×10^{5}	Condor Galaxy	
B153	6.86+5.45 −0.79×10^{5}	Andromeda Galaxy	
Messier 19	(6.80±0.59)×10^{5}	Milky Way	
Liller 1	(6.66±1.17)×10^{5}	Milky Way	
B109-G170	6.63+0.71 −0.62×10^{5}	Andromeda Galaxy	
[DBT2008] NGC 4713 77	6.61×10^{5}	NGC 4713	
B514-MCGC4	6.52+0.76 −0.58×10^{5}	Andromeda Galaxy	
B080-G141	6.50+1.00 −0.74×10^{5}	Andromeda Galaxy	
B148-G200	6.49+1.14 −0.96×10^{5}	Andromeda Galaxy	
[BHK2005] 397	6.46×10^{5}	Condor Galaxy	
Messier 22	6.44×10^{5}	Milky Way	
NGC 2404	6.40×10^{5}	NGC 2403	
B370-G300	6.40+0.56 −0.81×10^{5}	Andromeda Galaxy	
[DBT2008] NGC 4656 96	6.31×10^{5}	Hockey Stick Galaxies	
[BHK2005] 262	6.31×10^{5}	Condor Galaxy	
PA16	6.27+0.32 −0.29×10^{5}	Andromeda Galaxy	
Messier 2	6.27+0.09 −0.09×10^{5}	Milky Way	
B379-G312	6.25+0.69 −0.47×10^{5}	Andromeda Galaxy	
[DBT2008] NGC 4449 201	6.17×10^{5}	NGC 4449	
[DBT2008] NGC 4656 217	6.17×10^{5}	Hockey Stick Galaxies	
Messier 15	6.14+0.07 −0.07×10^{5}	Milky Way	
[DBT2008] NGC 4485 221	6.03×10^{5}	NGC 4485	
[DBT2008] NGC 4485 131	6.03×10^{5}	NGC 4485	
NGC 5986	5.99×10^{5}	Milky Way	
B038-G098	5.98+0.72 −0.30×10^{5}	Andromeda Galaxy	
B078-G140	5.94+0.93 −0.50×10^{5}	Andromeda Galaxy	
B044-G107	5.93+0.86 −0.61×10^{5}	Andromeda Galaxy	
B029-G090	5.92+1.57 −0.66×10^{5}	Andromeda Galaxy	
G002-MIII	5.90+0.47 −0.30×10^{5}	Andromeda Galaxy	
[DBT2008] NGC 4713 8	5.89×10^{5}	NGC 4713	
[DBT2008] NGC 4656 223	5.89×10^{5}	Hockey Stick Galaxies	
Messier 75	(5.86±1.24)×10^{5}	Milky Way	
B180-G231	5.83+1.01 −0.68×10^{5}	Andromeda Galaxy	
B260	5.76+1.37 −0.63×10^{5}	Andromeda Galaxy	
[DBT2008] NGC 4449 294	5.75×10^{5}	NGC 4449	
[BHK2005] 121	5.75×10^{5}	Condor Galaxy	
B344-G127	5.74+0.76 −0.87×10^{5}	Andromeda Galaxy	
NGC 6541	5.72×10^{5}	Milky Way	
Terzan 5	(5.66±0.71)×10^{5}	Milky Way	
NGC 6139	5.66×10^{5}	Milky Way	
[DBT2008] NGC 5457 418	5.62×10^{5}	Pinwheel Galaxy	
[DBT2008] NGC 4713 79	5.62×10^{5}	NGC 4713	
[DBT2008] NGC 4713 52	5.62×10^{5}	NGC 4713	
[DBT2008] NGC 4656 176	5.62×10^{5}	Hockey Stick Galaxies	
[BHK2005] 438	5.62×10^{5}	Condor Galaxy	
B233-G287	5.51+0.79 −1.23×10^{5}	Andromeda Galaxy	
NGC 6284	(5.51±1.13)×10^{5}	Milky Way	
NGC 1851	5.51×10^{5}	Milky Way	
Messier 28	5.51×10^{5}	Milky Way	
[DBT2008] NGC 4713 80	5.50×10^{5}	NGC 4713	
B403-G348	5.45+0.82 −0.45×10^{5}	Andromeda Galaxy	
B098	5.38+0.25 −0.30×10^{5}	Andromeda Galaxy	
[DBT2008] NGC 5457 598	5.37×10^{5}	Pinwheel Galaxy	
[DBT2008] NGC 4190 2	5.37×10^{5}	NGC 4190	
NGC 6539	5.36×10^{5}	Milky Way	
NGC 6539	5.36×10^{5}	Milky Way	
B257-V219	5.35+1.17 −0.58×10^{5}	Andromeda Galaxy	
B001-G039	5.34+0.85 −0.48×10^{5}	Andromeda Galaxy	
Messier 53	5.3+0.1 −0.1×10^{5}	Milky Way	
NGC 6517	5.26×10^{5}	Milky Way	
[DBT2008] NGC 4571 10	5.25×10^{5}	NGC 4571	
[DBT2008] NGC 4656 197	5.25×10^{5}	Hockey Stick Galaxies	
[DBT2008] NGC 4449 401	5.13×10^{5}	NGC 4449	
B001-G039	5.04+0.39 −0.35×10^{5}	Andromeda Galaxy	
PA46	5.02+0.53 −0.36×10^{5}	Andromeda Galaxy	
Messier 80	5.02×10^{5}	Milky Way	
[DBT2008] NGC 4713 4	5.01×10^{5}	NGC 4713	
[BHK2005] 221	5.01×10^{5}	Condor Galaxy	
B130-G188	5.01+0.42 −0.56×10^{5}	Andromeda Galaxy	

=== Open clusters ===
List of most massive open clusters
Cluster name	Mass (M_{☉}); (Sun = 1)	Galaxy	Notes
NGC 1569-B	(4.4±1.1)×10^{5}	NGC 1569	
NGC 1569-A	(3.3±0.5)×10^{5}	NGC 1569	
RMC 136	8.7×10^{4}	Large Magellanic Cloud	Contains the most massive known star R136a1 at 196+34 −27 M_{☉}.
NGC 346	5×10^{4}	Small Magellanic Cloud	
Ara Cluster (Westerlund 1)	4.4 – 5.7 × 10^{4}	Milky Way	
Stephenson 2 (RSGC2)	4×10^{4}	Milky Way	
RSGC1	(3±1)×10^{4}	Milky Way	
RSGC3	(3±1)×10^{4}	Milky Way	
NGC 3603	(1.9±0.6)×10^{4}	Milky Way	

== See also ==
- List of largest star clusters
