= List of largest star clusters =

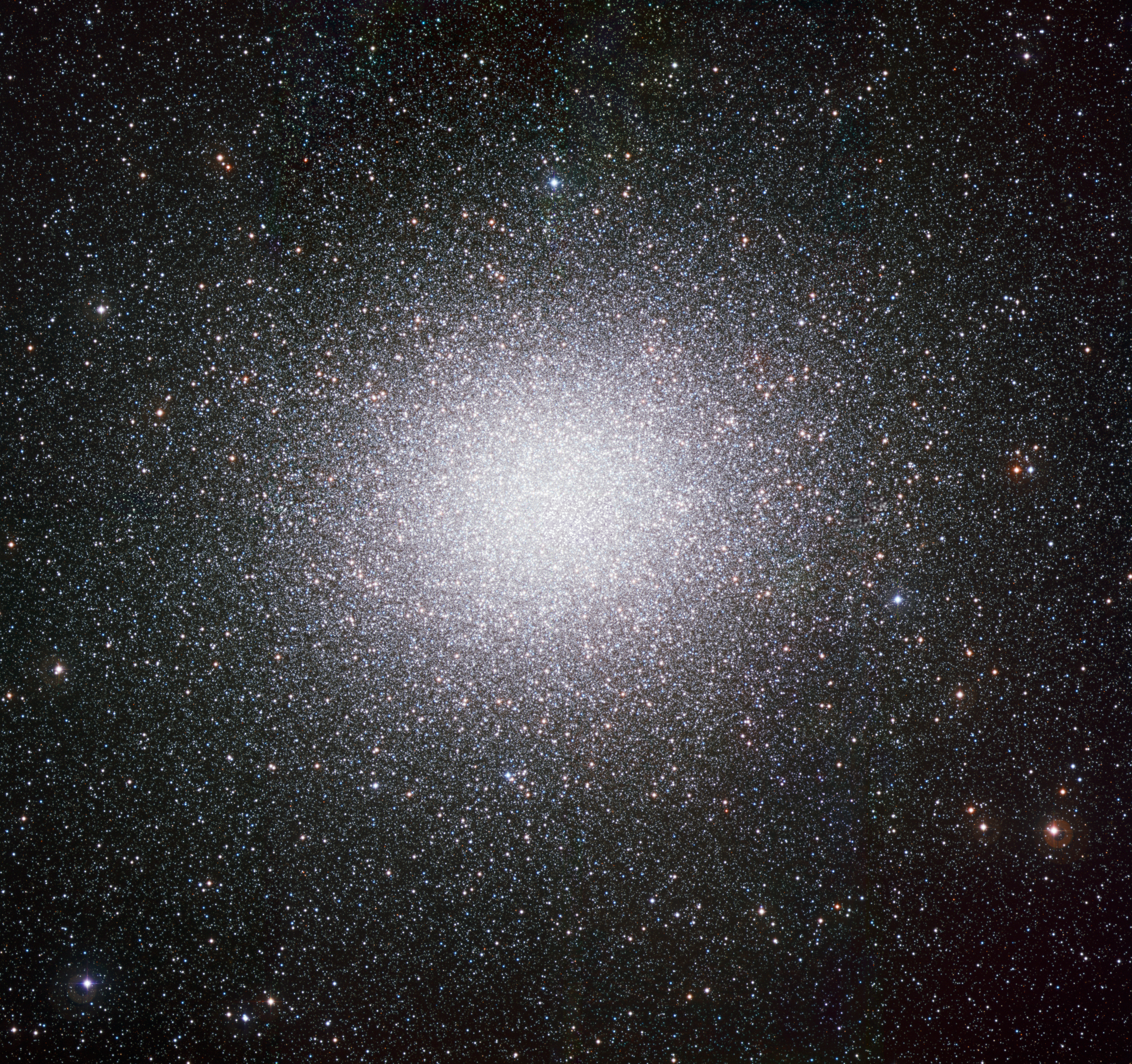
Omega Centauri, one of the largest star clusters.

Below is a list of the largest known star clusters, ordered by diameter in light years, above the size of 50 light years in diameter. This list includes globular clusters, open clusters, super star clusters, and other types.

== List ==
List of largest known star clusters
Cluster name	Diameter (light-years)	Type of cluster	Notes
Palomar 12	324	Globular cluster	Associated with the Sagittarius Stream, possibly captured from the Sagittarius Dwarf Spheroidal Galaxy. Might be the largest star cluster in the Milky Way.
Terzan 7	316	Globular cluster	Within the main body of the Sagittarius Dwarf Spheroidal Galaxy.
Messier 54	306	Globular cluster	The brightest globular cluster of the Sagittarius Dwarf Spheroidal Galaxy, appears to reside at its core.
NGC 339	238	Globular cluster	Located in the Small Magellanic Cloud.
Messier 3	226	Globular cluster	Quite isolated at 31.6 kly (9.7 kpc) above the Galactic plane and roughly 38.8 kly (11.9 kpc) from the center of the Milky Way.
Messier 11 (Wild Duck Cluster)	190	Open cluster	
Messier 2	174.4	Globular cluster	In the southern galactic cap of the Milky Way's galactic halo.
Omega Centauri	172 ± 12	Globular cluster	Might be the largest globular cluster in the Milky Way. Possibly a core of an absorbed dwarf galaxy.
Messier 13	168	Globular cluster	
Messier 15	166	Globular cluster	
Palomar 5	152	Globular cluster	
Messier 75	126	Globular cluster	
47 Tucanae	120	Globular cluster	
Messier 68	106	Globular cluster	
Messier 22	100 ± 10	Globular cluster	One of the first star clusters ever discovered.
Messier 14	100	Globular cluster	
Messier 62	98	Globular cluster	
Messier 55	96	Globular cluster	
NGC 265	94	Open cluster	
Messier 69	90	Globular cluster	
Messier 9	90	Globular cluster	
Messier 56	84	Globular cluster	
Messier 10	83.2	Globular cluster	
NGC 3201	80	Globular cluster	
Messier 107	79	Globular cluster	
Messier 46	75.6	Open cluster	
Messier 4	75	Globular cluster	Nearest globular cluster to the Earth. Also the first globular cluster known to have exoplanets (PSR B1620-26b)
Messier 12	74.4	Globular cluster	
Messier 70	68	Globular cluster	
NGC 290	66	Open cluster	
Messier 28	60	Globular cluster	
Messier 18	52.4	Open cluster	
The following notable star clusters are listed for the purpose of comparison.
MGC1	49 (half-light), 7,800 (tidal)	Globular cluster	
Mayall II	42±1 (half-light), 526±25.4 (tidal)	Globular cluster	
Pleiades	40.68	Open cluster	Nearest Messier Object to Earth and the easiest to see in the night sky.
RSGC2 (Stephenson 2)	26.1	Open cluster	
Alpha Persei cluster	22.8	Open cluster	
Jewel Box	20	Open cluster	
Hyades	17.6	Open cluster	Nearest open cluster
Beehive Cluster (Praesepe)	15	Open cluster	
RSGC1	9.78 ± 1.96	Open cluster	
Westerlund 1 (Ara Cluster)	6.52	Super Star Cluster/Open cluster	

== See also ==
- List of most massive star clusters
