= NGC 4523 =

Spiral galaxy in the constellation Coma Berenices

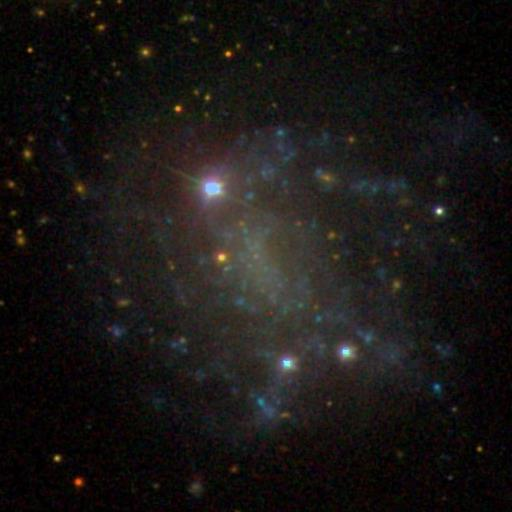
- SDSS image of NGC 4523.

Observation data (J2000 epoch)
- Constellation: Coma Berenices
- Right ascension: 12^{h} 33^{m} 48.0000^{s}
- Declination: 15° 10′ 05.001″
- Redshift: 0.000864
- Heliocentric radial velocity: 259±5 km/s
- Distance: 42.38 ± 6.52 Mly (13 ± 2 Mpc)
- Group or cluster: Virgo Cluster
- Apparent magnitude (V): 14.42

Characteristics
- Type: SAB(s)m
- Size: ~39,600 ly (estimated)
- Apparent size (V): 2.0 x 1.9

Other designations
- VCC 1524, IRAS 12313+1526, UGC 7713, MCG +03-32-068, PGC 041746, CGCG 099-089

NGC 4523 is a Magellanic spiral galaxy located about 35 to 50 million light-years away in the constellation Coma Berenices. It was discovered by astronomer Heinrich d'Arrest on April 19, 1865. NGC 4523 is a member of the Virgo Cluster. A distance of (13 ± 2 Mpc) for NGC 4523 was derived from using yellow supergiants in the galaxy as standard candles.

== Supernova ==
One supernova has been observed in NGC 4523:

- SN 1999gq (Type II, mag. 14.5) was discovered by the Lick Observatory Supernova Search (LOSS) on December 23, 1999.

== See also ==
- NGC 4571
