= NGC 4485 =

Irregular galaxy in the constellation Canes Venatici

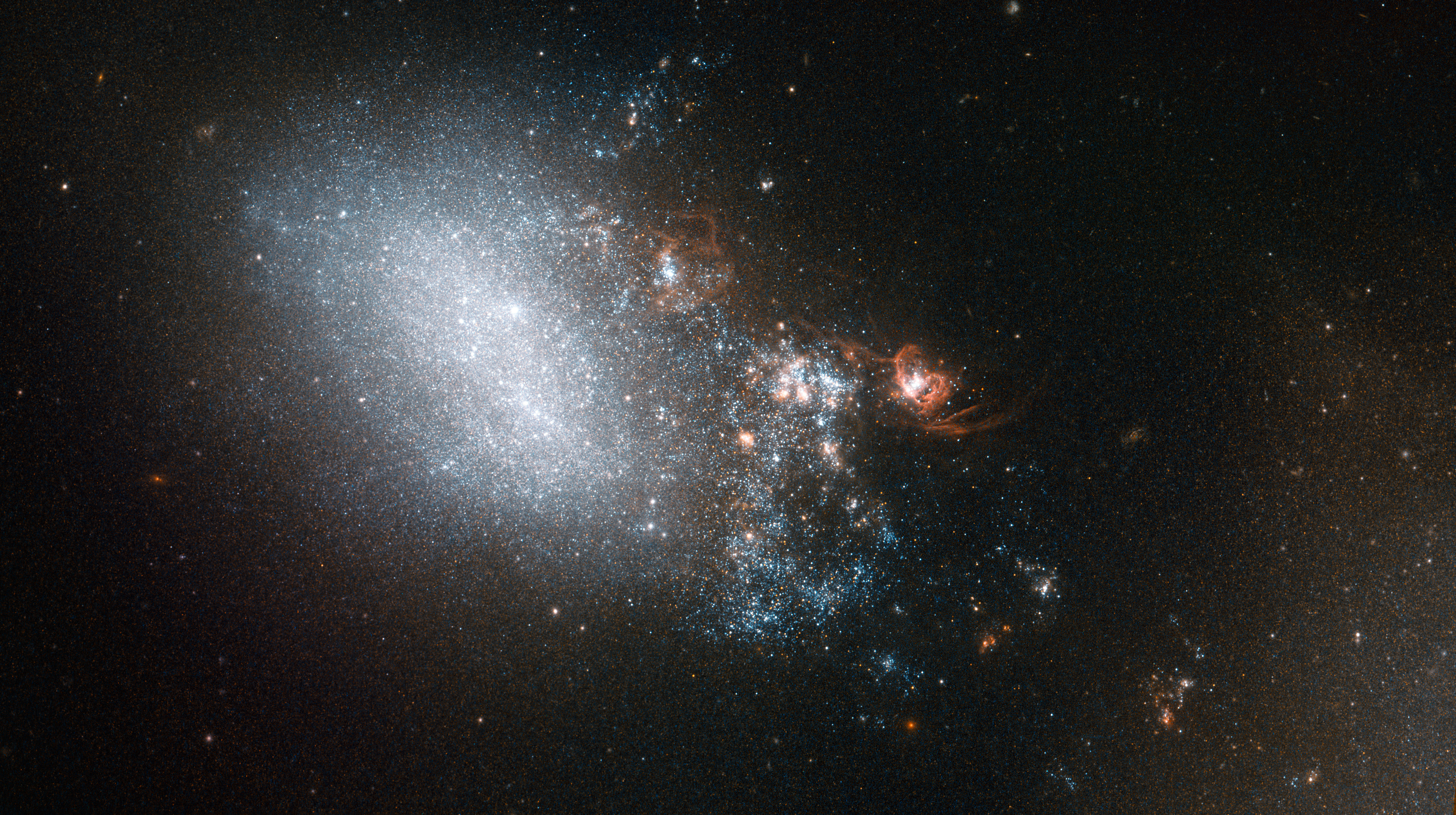
- NGC 4485 imaged by the Hubble Space Telescope.

Observation data (J2000 epoch)
- Constellation: Canes Venatici
- Right ascension: 12^{h} 30^{m} 31.113^{s}
- Declination: +41° 42′ 04.22″
- Redshift: 0.0016
- Heliocentric radial velocity: 483
- Distance: 29.1 Mly (8.91 Mpc)
- Apparent magnitude (V): 11.7
- Apparent magnitude (B): 12.32

Characteristics
- Type: IB(s)m pec
- Size: ~11,000 ly
- Apparent size (V): 2.4′ × 1.8′

Other designations
- 2MASX J12303111+4142042, NGC 4485, UGC 7648, MCG +07-26-013, PGC 41326, VV 30b, KPG 341a

NGC 4485 is an irregular barred galaxy located in the northern constellation of Canes Venatici. It was discovered January 14, 1788 by William Herschel. This galaxy is located at a distance of 29 million light years and is receding with a heliocentric radial velocity of 483 km/s.

NGC 4485 is interacting with the spiral galaxy NGC 4490 and as a result both galaxies are distorted and are undergoing intense star formation. They have a projected separation of 9.3 kpc and are surrounded by an extended hydrogen envelope with a dense bridge of gas joining the two. Both galaxies are otherwise isolated and of low mass. The star formation rate in NGC 4485 is 0.22 M_{☉}·yr^{−1}.

== Gallery ==
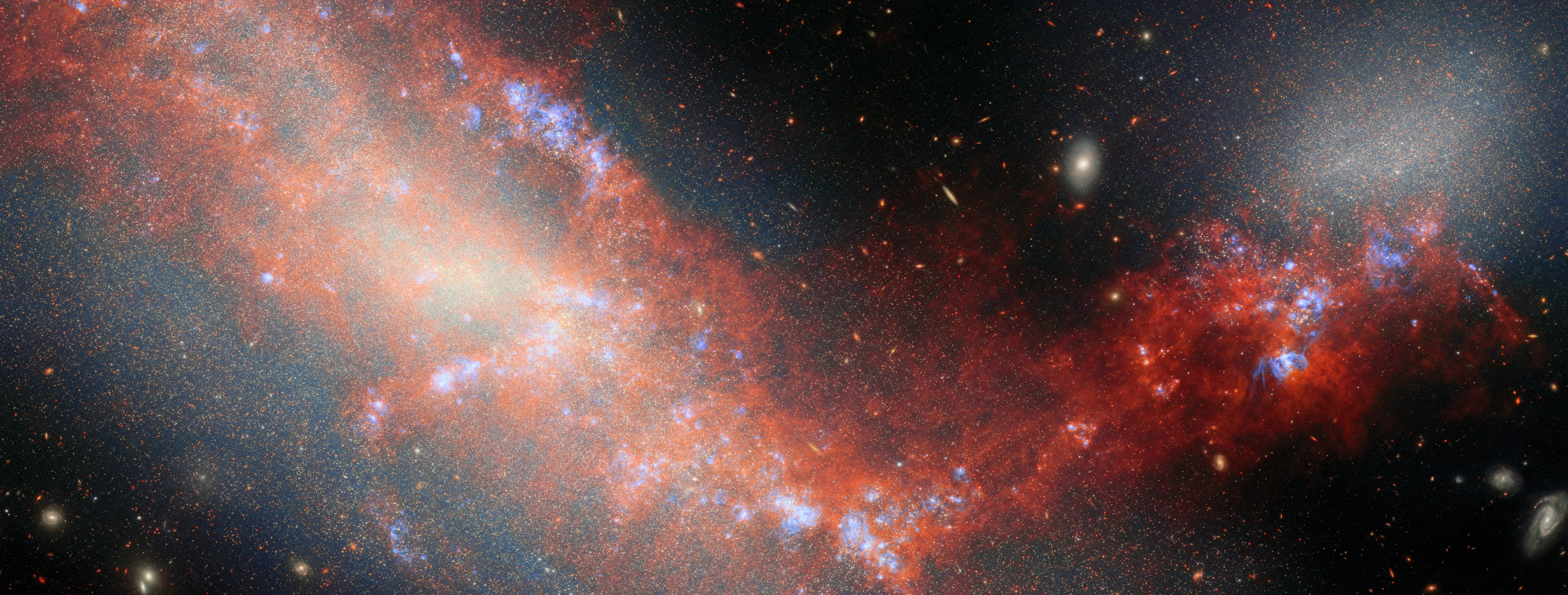
NGC 4490 and NGC 4485 imaged by the James Webb Space Telescope

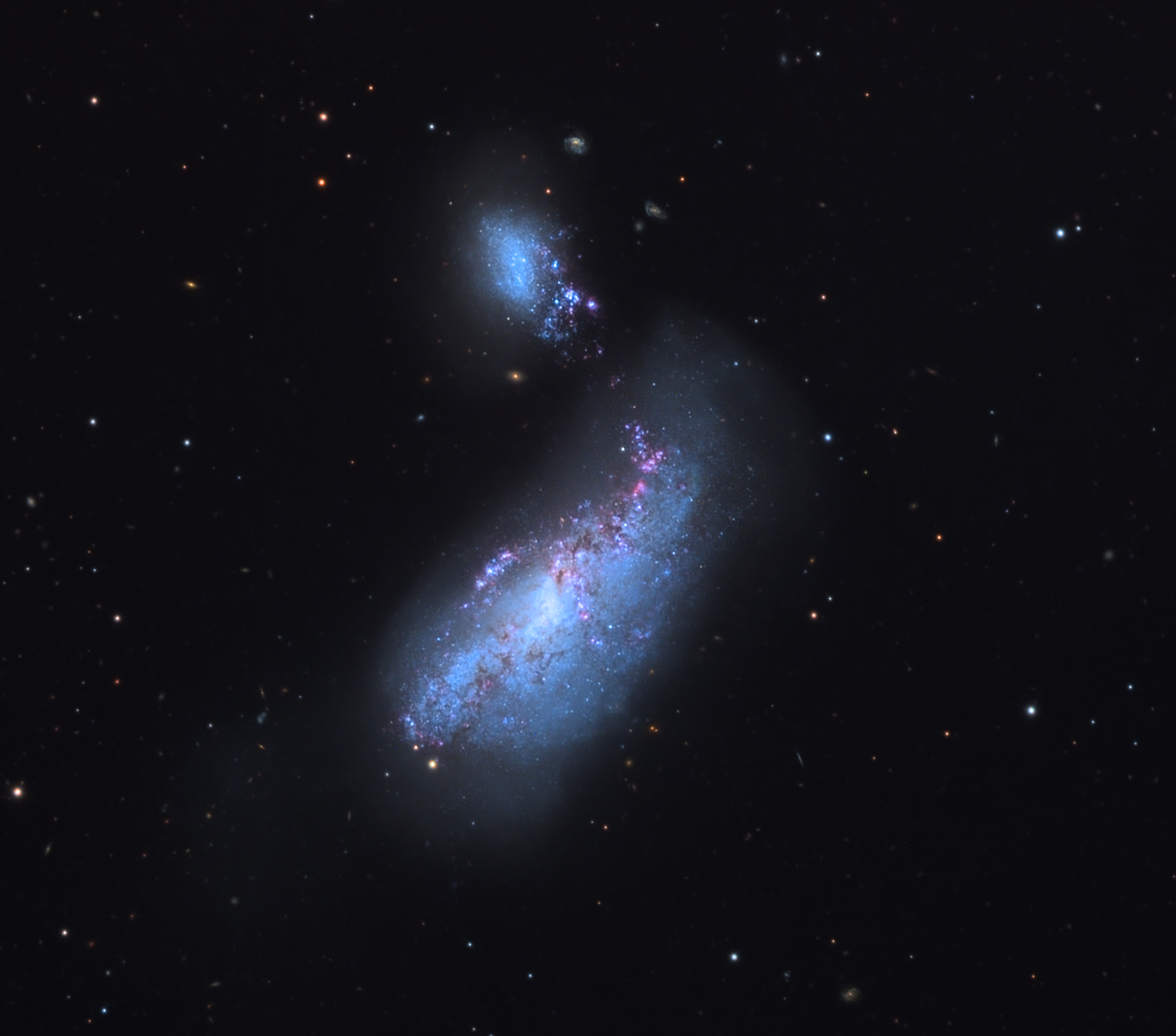
NGC 4485 and NGC 4490.

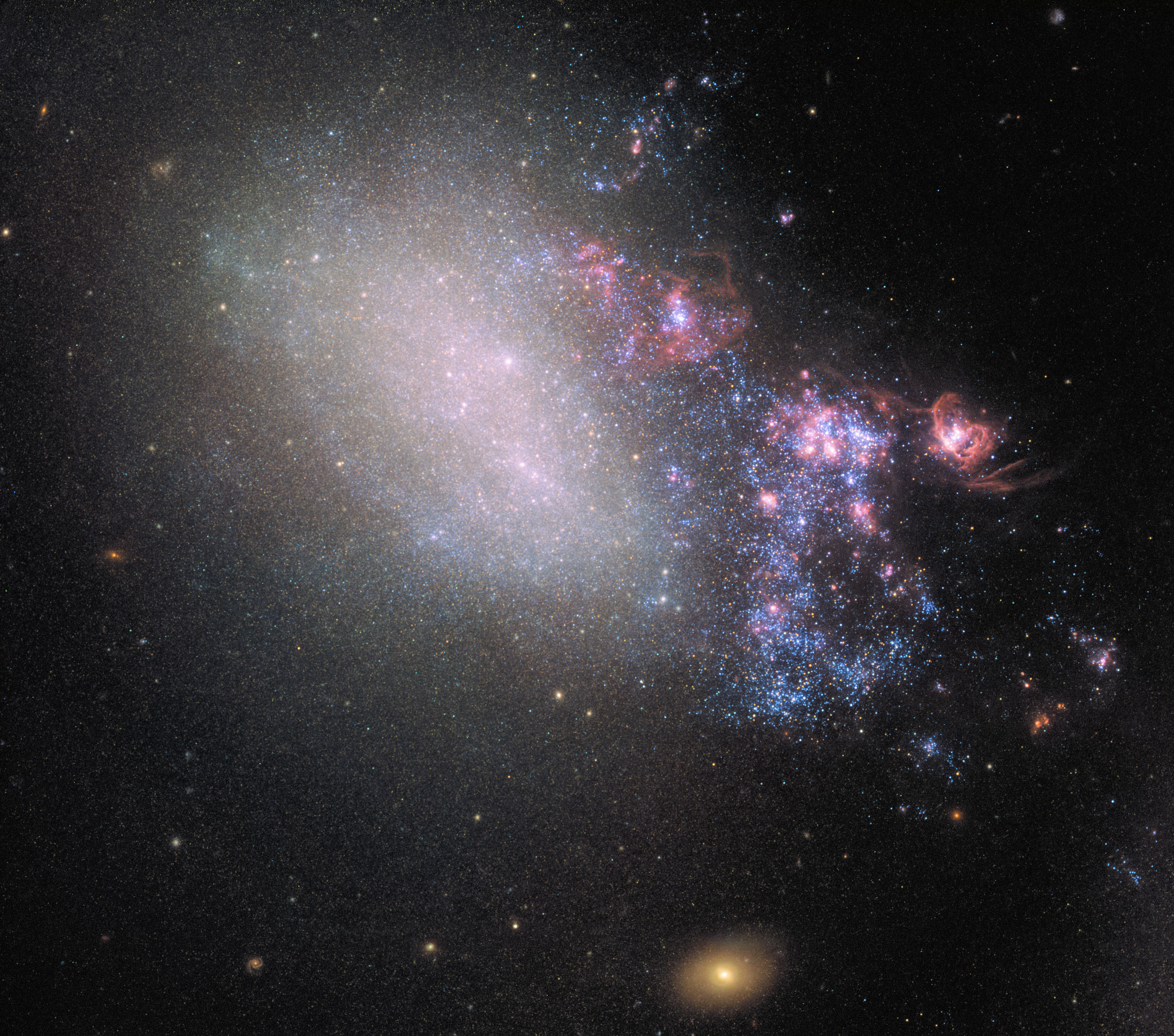
Interaction between them created a stream of material about 25 000 light-years long.
