= NGC 4449 =

Galaxy in the constellation Canes Venatici

- NGC 4449 imaged by the Hubble Space Telescope

Observation data (J2000 epoch)
- Constellation: Canes Venatici
- Right ascension: 12^{h} 28^{m} 11.1237^{s}
- Declination: +44° 05′ 37.197″
- Redshift: 0.000690±0.000013
- Heliocentric radial velocity: 207±4 km/s
- Distance: 13.08 ± 0.98 Mly (4.01 ± 0.30 Mpc)
- Apparent magnitude (V): 9.4

Characteristics
- Type: IBm
- Size: ~29,400 ly (9.02 kpc) (estimated)
- Apparent size (V): 6.2′ × 4.4′

Other designations
- UGC 7592, MCG +07-26-009, PGC 40973, CGCG 216-005, C 21

NGC 4449, also known as Caldwell 21, is an irregular Magellanic type galaxy in the constellation Canes Venatici. It was discovered by German-British astronomer William Herschel on 27 April 1788. This galaxy is located about 13 million light-years away, where it is part of the M94 Group or Canes Venatici I Group that is relatively close to the Local Group hosting our Milky Way galaxy.

== Characteristics ==
This galaxy is similar in nature to the Milky Way's satellite galaxy, the Large Magellanic Cloud (LMC), though is not as bright nor as large. NGC 4449 has a general bar shape, also characteristic of the LMC, with scattered young blue star clusters.

Unlike the Large Magellanic Cloud, however, NGC 4449 is considered a starburst galaxy due to its high rate of star formation (twice that of the LMC) and includes several massive and young star clusters, one of them in the galaxy's center.

Photos of the galaxy show the pinkish glow of atomic hydrogen gas, the telltale tracer of massive star forming regions.

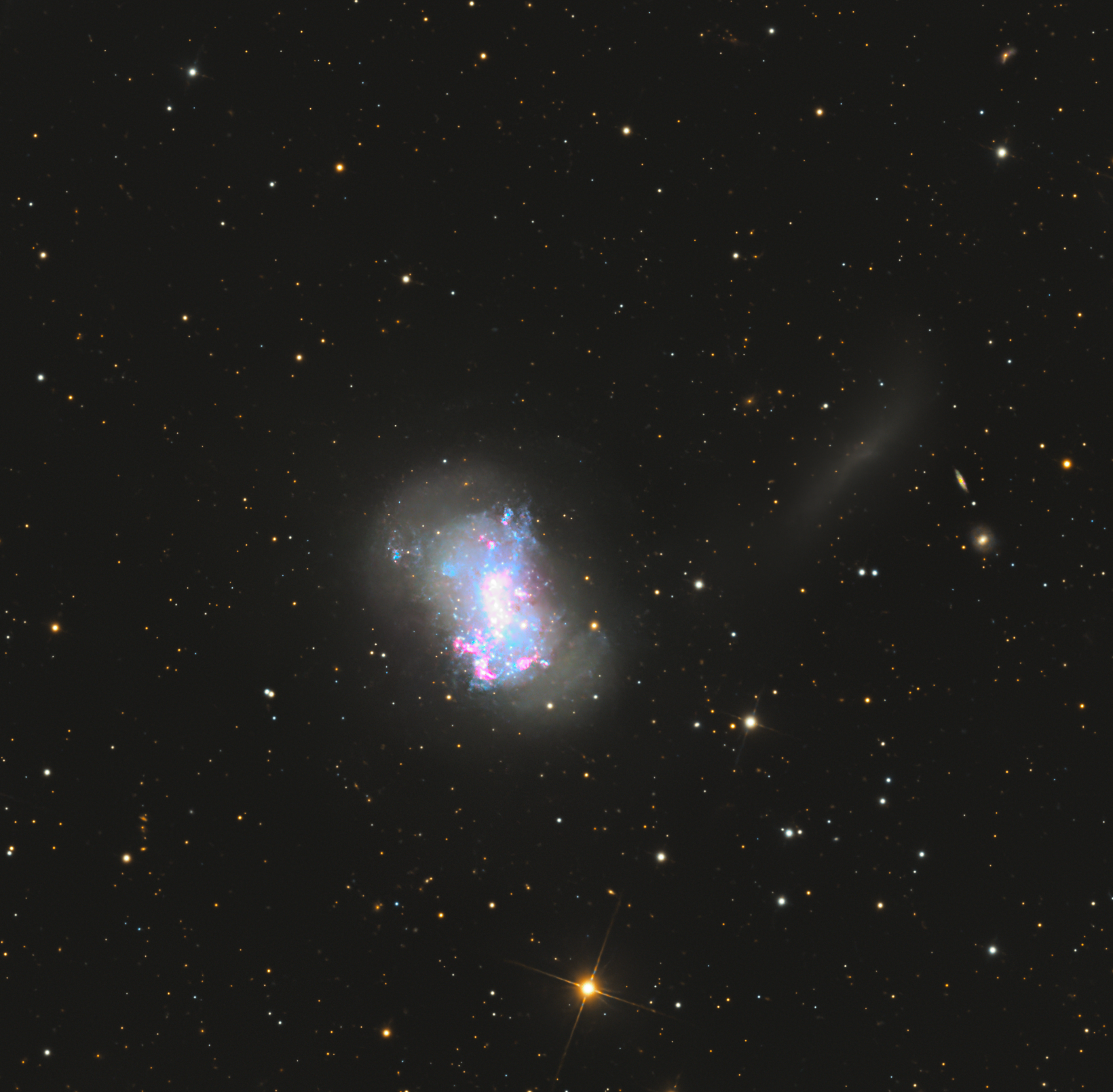
Deep imaging reveals faint stellar streams surrounding the galaxy, which are the remnants of a smaller satellite galaxy being disrupted and merged by gravitational forces.

NGC 4449 is surrounded by a large envelope of neutral hydrogen that extends over an area of 75 arc minutes (14 times larger than the optical diameter of the galaxy). The envelope shows distortions and irregularities likely caused by interactions with nearby galaxies.

Interactions with nearby galaxies are thought to have influenced star formation in NGC 4449 and, in fact, in 2012 two small galaxies have been discovered interacting with this galaxy: a very low surface brightness disrupted dwarf spheroidal with the same stellar mass as NGC 4449's halo but with a ratio of dark matter to stellar matter between 5 and 10 times that of NGC 4449 and a highly flattened globular cluster with two tails of young stars that may be the nucleus of a gas-rich galaxy. Both satellites have apparently been disrupted by NGC 4449 and are now being absorbed by it.

At least one ultraluminous X-ray source (ULX) is known in NGC 4449, called NGC 4449 X7. There are three candidates that have been identified as optical counterparts to NGC 4449 X7 (i.e. they may be associated with the ULX). They are all early (B-type to F-type) supergiants that are estimated to be about 40 to 50 million years old and about 8 times the mass of the Sun.

== See also ==
- List of NGC objects (4001–5000)
