= NGC 6539 =

Globular cluster in the constellation Serpens

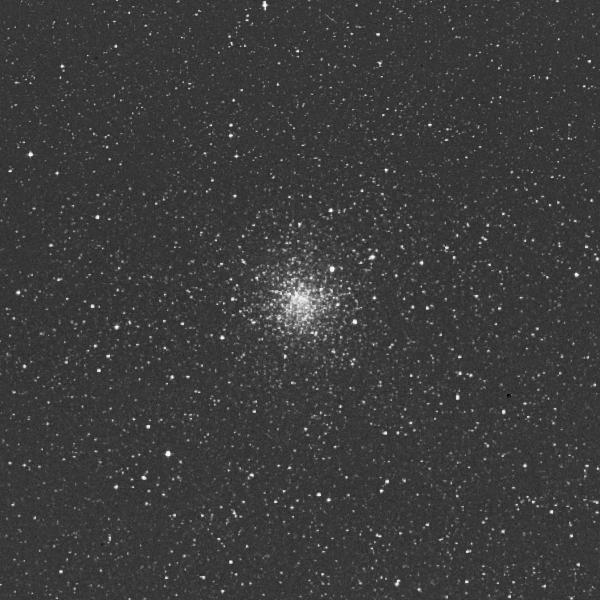
- Globular cluster NGC 6539

Observation data (J2000 epoch)
- Class: X:
- Constellation: Serpens
- Right ascension: 18^{h} 04^{m} 49.74^{s}
- Declination: –07° 35′ 09.1″
- Distance: 26.63 kly (8.165 kpc)
- Apparent magnitude (V): 9.6
- Apparent dimensions (V): 6.9′

Physical characteristics
- Absolute magnitude: −8.21
- Mass: 5.36×10^{5} M_{☉}
- Metallicity: [Fe/H] = −0.66 dex
- Other designations: GCL 85

NGC 6539, or GCL 85, is a globular cluster of stars in the constellation Serpens. It was discovered by Danish astronomer Theodor Brorsen in 1856. This cluster is visible with a small amateur telescope, having an apparent visual magnitude of 9.6 and an angular size of 6.9″. It is located at a distance of 26.63 kly (8.165 kpc) from the Sun, and 10 kly (3.1 kpc) from the Galactic Center.

This cluster is located in the outer parts of the Galactic bulge. There is a large dark cloud complex located in the fore of this cluster, causing reddening from extinction. NGC 6539 has a core radius of 0.54′, a half-mass radius of 1.67′, and a tidal radius of 21.5′. Compared to other globular clusters, NGC 6539 is considered metal rich, indicating that it has a relatively higher abundance of elements more massive than helium. Thirteen variable stars have been detected within 7′ of the core, of which a dozen are long period variables. A millisecond pulsar was discovered in 1990.
