= NGC 339 =

Globular cluster in the Small Magellanic Cloud

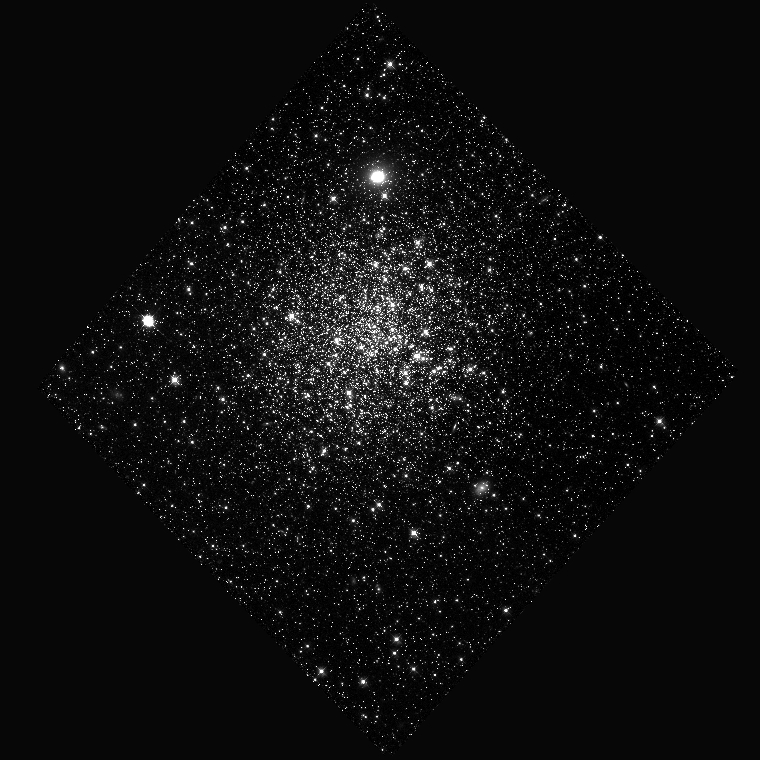
- NGC 339 imaged by the Hubble Space Telescope

Observation data (J2000.0 epoch)
- Class: ~VIII
- Constellation: Tucana
- Right ascension: 00^{h} 57^{m} 45.0^{s}
- Declination: −74° 28′ 20″
- Distance: 186 ± 4 kly (57 ± 1 kpc)
- Apparent magnitude (V): 12.12
- Apparent dimensions (V): 2.2 arcminutes

Physical characteristics
- Mass: 5.7×10^{4} M_{☉}
- Radius: 119 ± 3 ly (36.5 ± 0.7 pc)
- Estimated age: 6.30±0.50 Gyr
- Other designations: ESO 029-SC 02

NGC 339 is a globular cluster in the constellation Tucana the Toucan. It is located both visually and physically in the Small Magellanic Cloud, being only about 10,000 ± 12,000 light years (3,000 ± 3,000 parsecs) closer than the cloud. It is rather prominent, being the brightest cluster in the southern reaches of the cloud. It was discovered by John Herschel on September 18, 1835. It was observed in 2005 by the Hubble Space Telescope. Its apparent V-band magnitude is 12.12, but at this wavelength, it has 0.19 magnitudes of interstellar extinction.

NGC 339 is about 6.3 billion years old. Its estimated mass is 5.7×10^{4} M_{☉}, and its total luminosity is 7.2×10^{4} L_{☉}, leading to a mass-to-luminosity ratio of 0.79 M_{☉}/L_{☉}. All else equal, older star clusters have higher mass-to-luminosity ratios; that is, they have lower luminosities for the same mass.
