= NGC 4713 =

Galaxy in the constellation Virgo

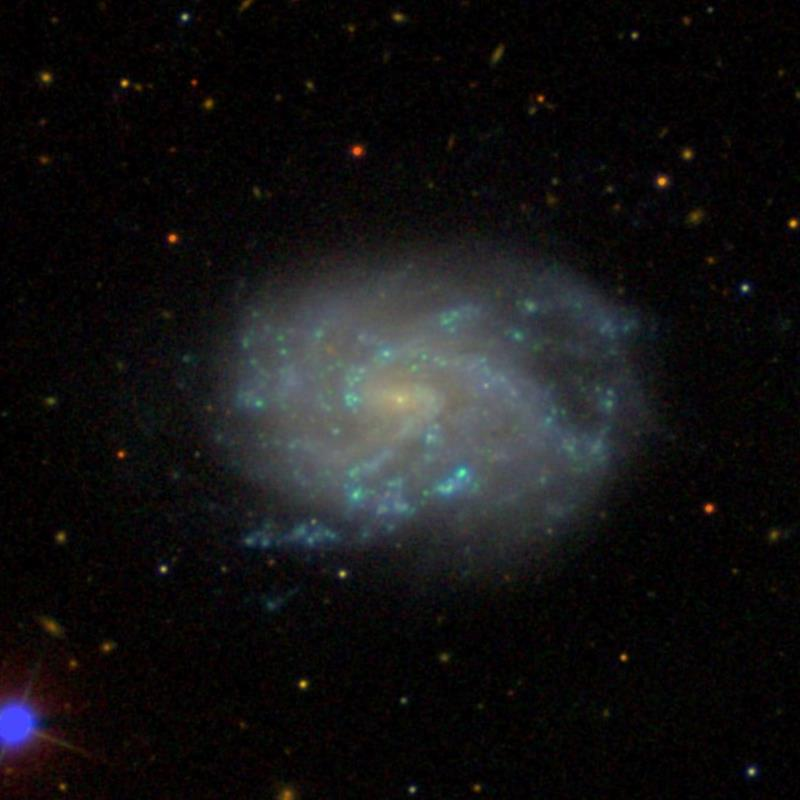
- NGC 4713 imaged by the Sloan Digital Sky Survey

Observation data (J2000 epoch)
- Constellation: Virgo
- Right ascension: 12^{h} 49^{m} 57.8972^{s}
- Declination: +05° 18′ 40.795″
- Redshift: 0.002183 ± 0.000002
- Heliocentric radial velocity: 654 ± 1 km/s
- Distance: 45.1 ± 11.6 Mly (13.8 ± 3.6 Mpc)
- Apparent magnitude (V): 11.4

Characteristics
- Type: SAB(rs)d
- Size: ~42,000 ly (12.9 kpc) (estimated)
- Apparent size (V): 2.28′ × 1.56′

Other designations
- IRAS 12474+0534, UGC 7985, MCG +01-33-018, PGC 43413, CGCG 043-041

NGC 4713 is a spiral galaxy in the constellation Virgo. The galaxy lies about 45 million light years away from Earth, which means, given its apparent dimensions, that NGC 4713 is approximately 40,000 light years across. It was discovered by William Herschel on April 17, 1786.

== Characteristics ==
The galaxy has a small bright nucleus in a short bar, about 0.35 arcminutes long. A pseudoring with a diameter of 0.4 arcminutes is visible. Two filamentary spiral arms emerge from the bar with many knots and fragments. The spiral arm pattern is smooth and symmetrical. The galaxy is a strong source of H-alpha.

In images by Hubble Space Telescope NGC 4713 contains a slightly resolved nuclear star cluster with an equivalent-axis half-light radius equal to 0.″07 (5 pc). The mass of the cluster is estimated to be 10^{6.43 ± 0.31} (1.3 – 5.5 millions) M_{☉}. The nucleus also hosts a black hole with an estimated mass of 10^{4.56 ± 1.66} (800 – 1.7 millions) M_{☉} based on the Sérsic profile of the star cluster. Based on other models, the mass of the central back hole is estimated to be 600 to 9,000 solar masses, which positions it as an intermediate mass black hole. Its nucleus has a spectrum that categorises it as a type 2 transition object, lying between an HII region and a LINER. The galaxy also emits X-Rays and the Fe-K line is faintly detected. The data from Chandra X-ray Observatory show a point X-ray source with a luminosity 3.1+1.9
−1.4×10^{38} erg/s. It is a source of soft X-rays.

The galaxy has a large hydrogen disk, as visible in hydrogen line. The disk appears wrapped beyond the optical disk. The central region of the galaxy, were the bar is located, is deficient in hydrogen. The kinematics suggest that the faint outer disk of the galaxy rotates at an angle with respect to the rest of the galaxy.

== Nearby galaxies ==
NGC 4713 is a member of the NGC 4753 Group, also known as LGG 315. Other members of the group include NGC 4643, NGC 4753, NGC 4771, NGC 4845, NGC 4900, NGC 4904, and NGC 4808. It is part of the Virgo II Groups, a chain of groups extending from the Virgo Cluster.

== Gallery ==
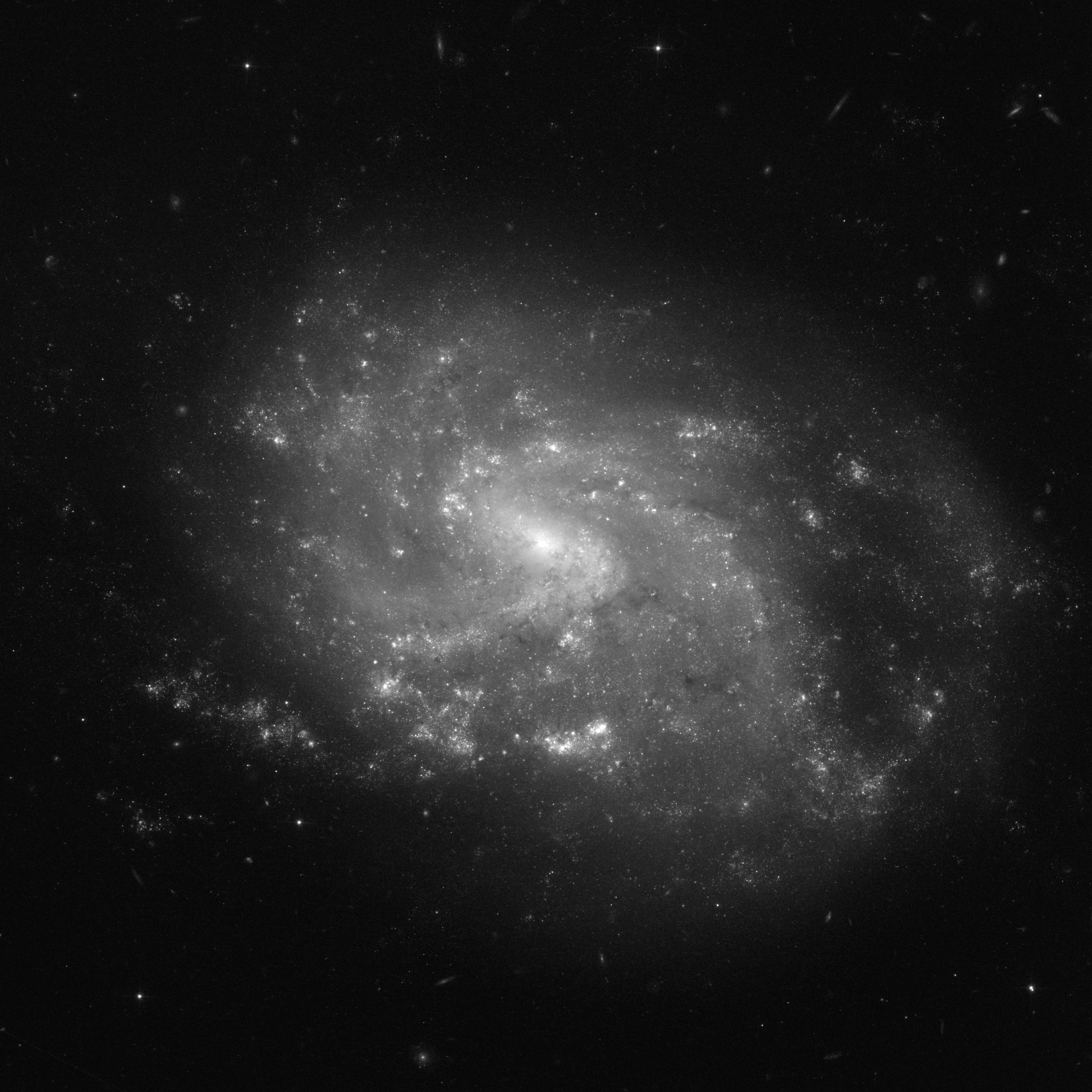
NGC 4713 by the Hubble Space Telescope
