= Messier 75 =

Globular cluster in the constellation Sagittarius

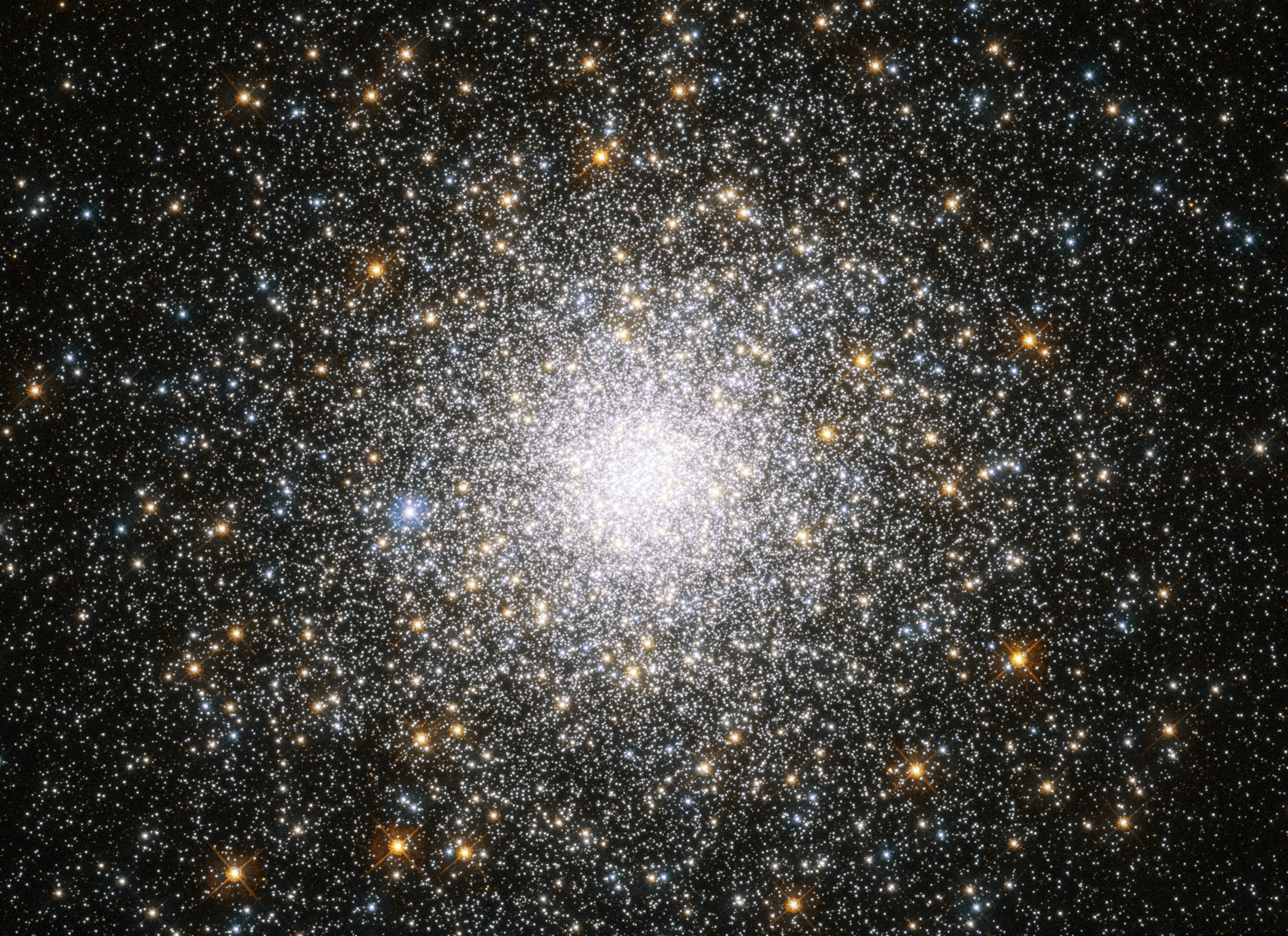

Observation data (J2000 epoch)
- Class: I
- Constellation: Sagittarius
- Right ascension: 20^{h} 06^{m} 04.85^{s}
- Declination: −21° 55′ 17.85″
- Distance: 68 kly (20.9 kpc)
- Apparent magnitude (V): 8.5
- Apparent dimensions (V): 6.8′

Physical characteristics
- Absolute magnitude: −8.57
- Radius: 67 ly
- Tidal radius: 5.7′
- Metallicity: [Fe/H] = −1.29 dex
- Other designations: GCl 116, M75, NGC 6864

Messier 75 or M75, also known as NGC 6864, is a globular cluster of stars in the southern constellation Sagittarius. (Note: In a mildly south part of this zone of the sky, +90 declination would give a zenith above the north pole, whereas minus 22 degrees (rounded) precludes it from rising therefore (being above the horizon) at the 68th parallel north and hampers visibility at lower latitudes nearby) It was discovered by Pierre Méchain in 1780 and included in Charles Messier's catalog of comet-like objects that same year.

M75 is about 67,500 light years away from Earth and is 14,700 light years away from, and on the opposite side of, the Galactic Center. Its apparent size on the sky translates to a true radius of 67 light years. M75 is a class I globular cluster in the Shapely–Sawyer Concentration classification, meaning it is one of the most densely concentrated globular clusters known. It shows a slow rotation around an axis that is inclined along a position angle of −15°±30°. The absolute magnitude of M75 is about −8.5, equating to 180,000 times more luminous than the Sun (L_{☉}).

The cluster has a half-light radius of 9.1 ly (2.80 pc) with a core radius of about 1.6 ly (0.5 pc) and appears not to have undergone core collapse yet. The mass density at the core is 7.9×10^{4} M_{☉}·pc^{−3}. (Note: meaning: per cubic parsec) There are 38 RR Lyrae variable stars and the cluster appears to be Oosterhoff-intermediate in terms of metallicity. 62 candidate blue stragglers have been identified in the cluster field, with 60% being in the core region.

Messier 75 is part of the Gaia Sausage, the hypothesized remains of a dwarf galaxy that merged with the Milky Way. It is a halo object with an orbital period of 0.4 billion years to travel around the galaxy on a very pronounced ellipse, specifically eccentricity of 0.87. The apocenter (maximal distance from Earth) is about 57,000 ly (17,500 pc).

== Gallery ==
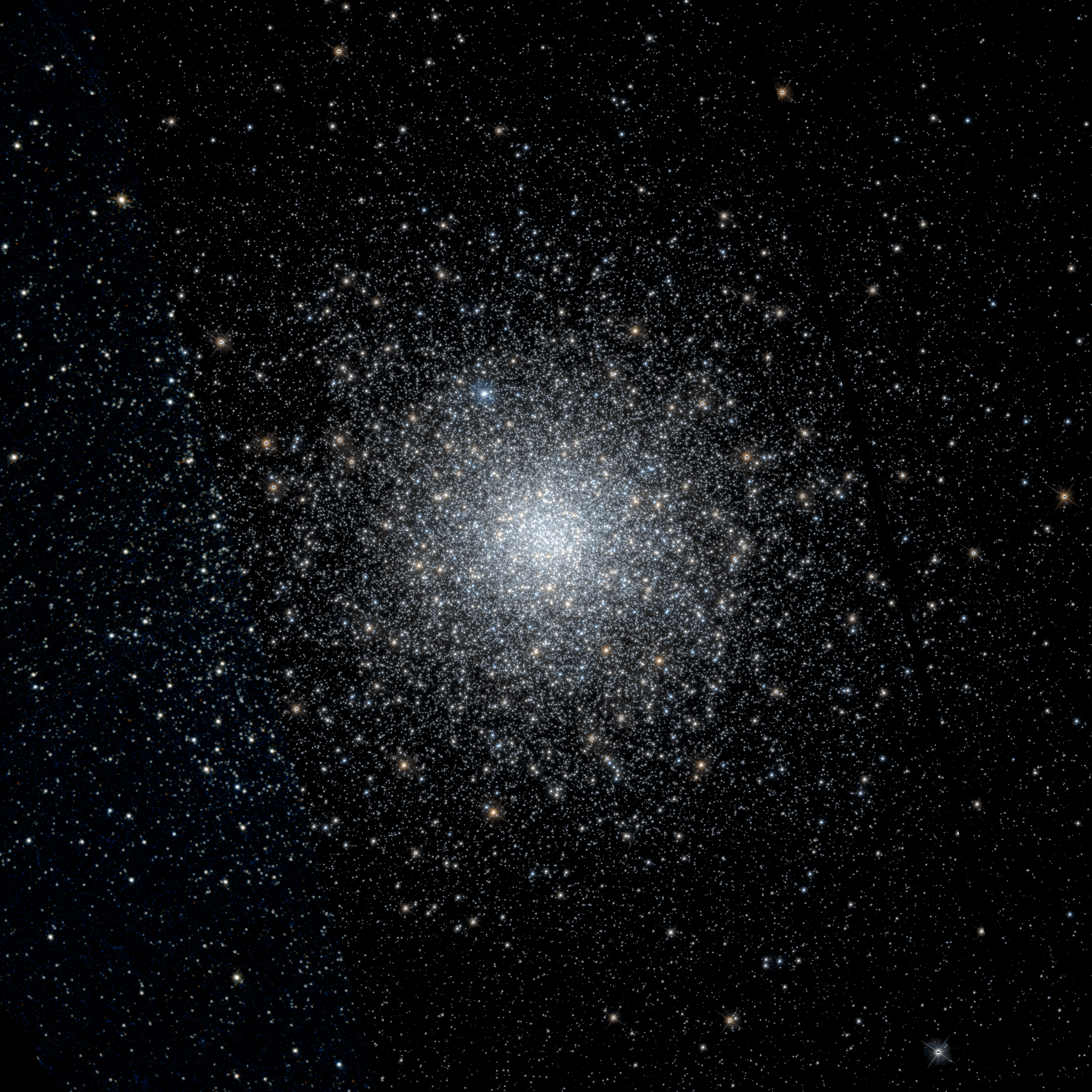
Messier 75 – wide field view

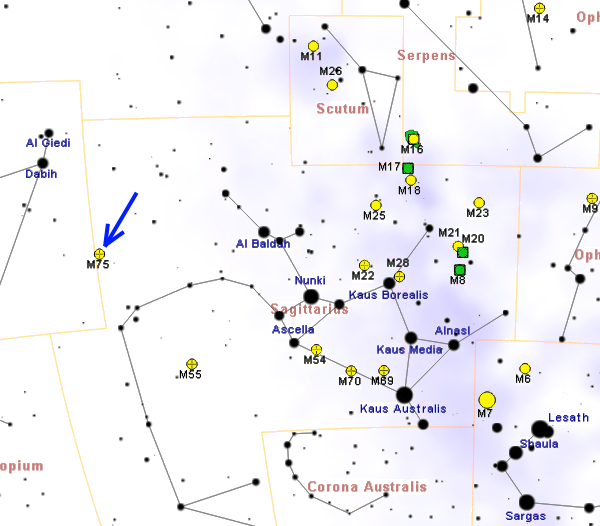
Map showing location of M75

== See also ==
- List of Messier objects
