= NGC 4571 =

Galaxy in the constellation Coma Berenices

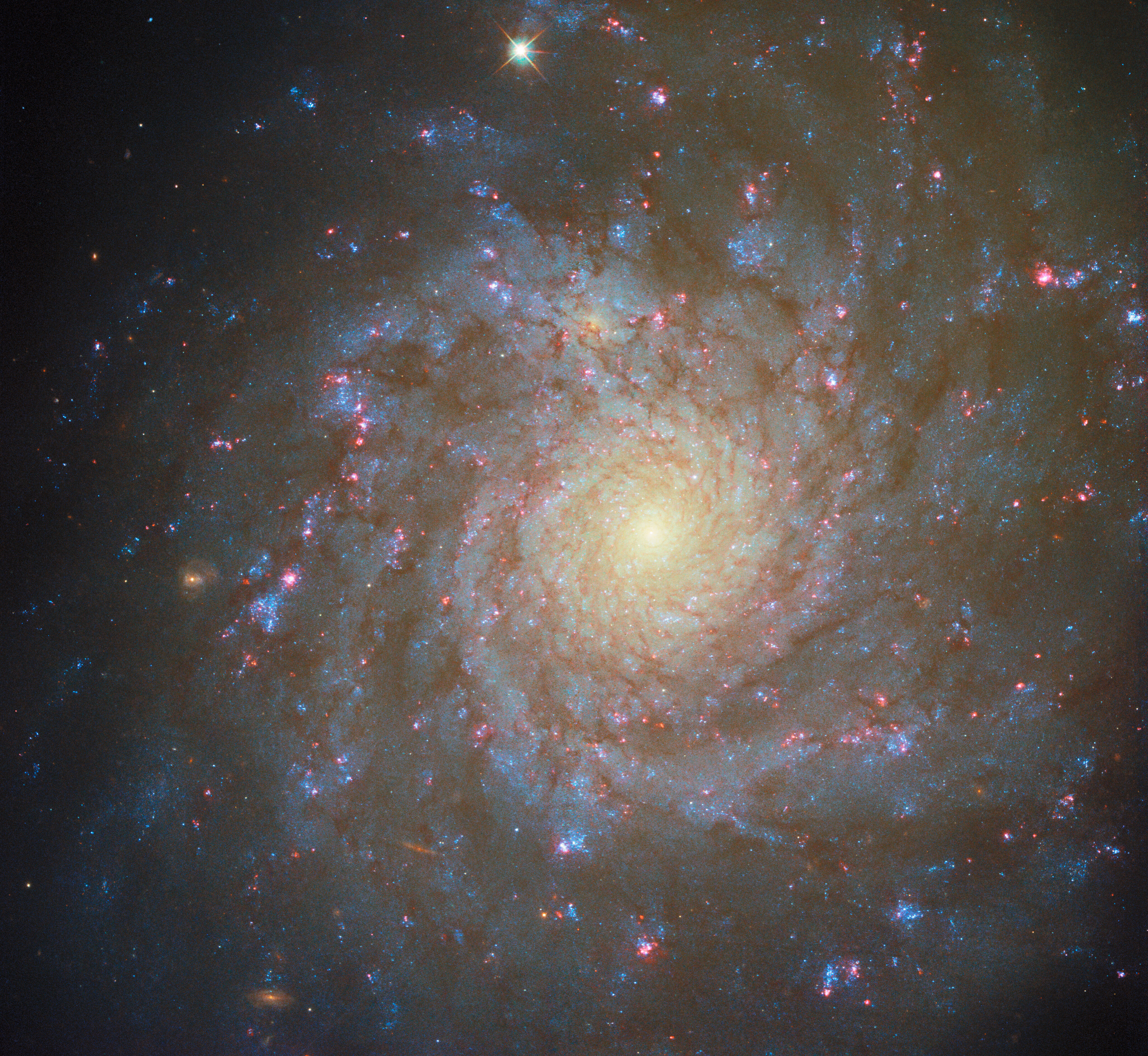
- NGC 4571 imaged by the Hubble Space Telescope

Observation data (J2000 epoch)
- Constellation: Coma Berenices
- Right ascension: 12^{h} 36^{m} 56.3959^{s}
- Declination: +14° 13′ 02.627″
- Redshift: 0.001107±0.0000118
- Heliocentric radial velocity: 332±4 km/s
- Distance: 52.59 ± 1.66 Mly (16.124 ± 0.508 Mpc)
- Apparent magnitude (V): 11.8

Characteristics
- Type: SA(r)d
- Size: ~71,600 ly (21.96 kpc) (estimated)
- Apparent size (V): 3.6′ × 3.2′

Other designations
- VCC 1696, IRAS 12344+1429, IC 3588, UGC 7788, MCG +02-32-156, PGC 42100, CGCG 070-194

NGC 4571 is a spiral galaxy located in the constellation of Coma Berenices. It was discovered by German-British astronomer William Herschel on 14 January 1787. It was also observed by German astronomer Friedrich Schwassmann on 23 November 1900, causing it to be listed in the Index Catalogue as IC 3588. John Dreyer thought this galaxy might be the "lost" Messier 91, but in 1969, amateur astronomer William C. Williams realized that M91 was actually NGC 4548.

== Physical properties ==
The finding of Cepheids by the Canada France Hawaii Telescope in 1994 has established that this galaxy is a member of the Virgo Cluster.

Despite being classified as a late-type galaxy, NGC 4571 has features more typical of spiral galaxies of earlier Hubble type such as a high color index, both low star-formation rate and H-alpha brightness, and relatively little neutral hydrogen, suggesting it may have lost most of its gas due to interactions with Virgo's intragalactic medium and/or past interactions with other galaxies of the cluster.

The low-surface-brightness galaxy Malin 1 is located close to this object. It is totally unrelated, however, as it lies at a much higher distance.

== Gallery ==
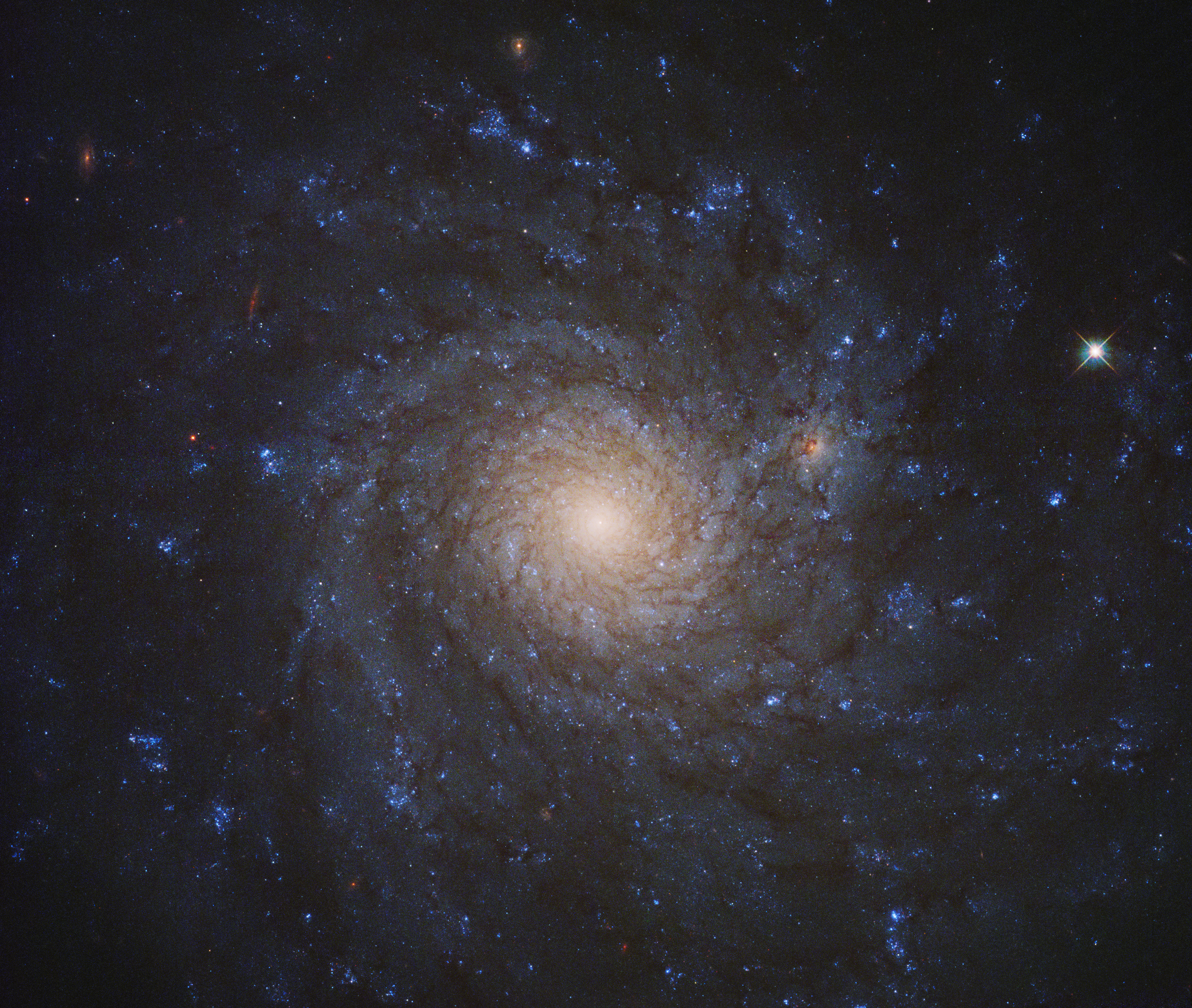
NGC 4571 imaged by the Hubble Space Telescope

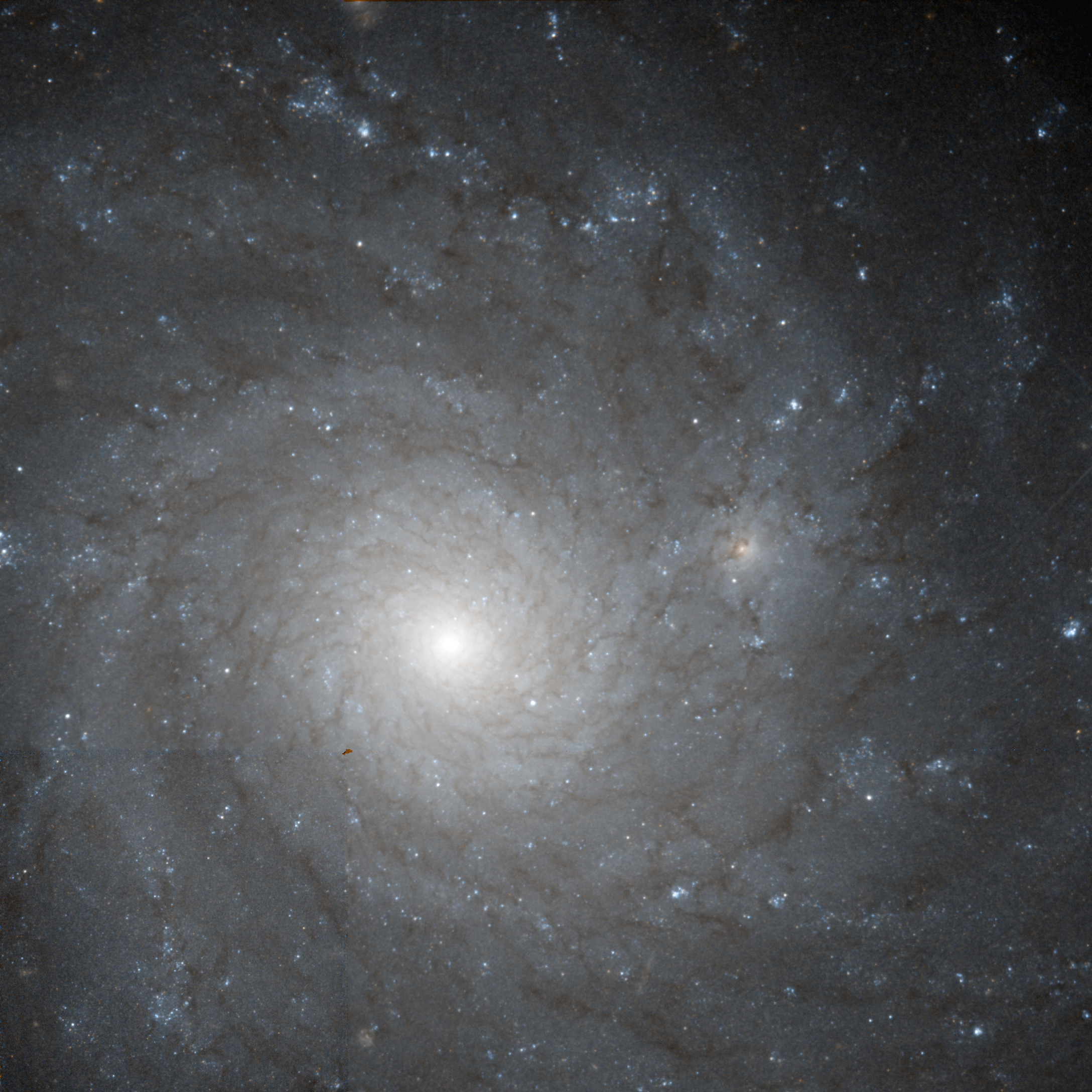
NGC 4571 by Hubble Space Telescope

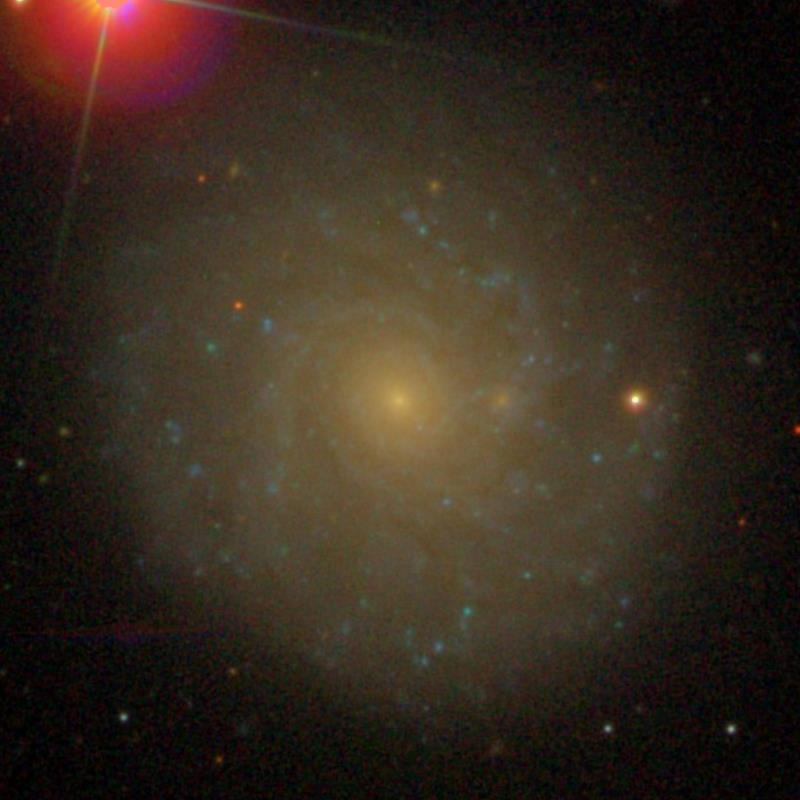
NGC 4571 (SDSS DR14)
