= Messier 62 =

Globular cluster in the constellation Ophiuchus

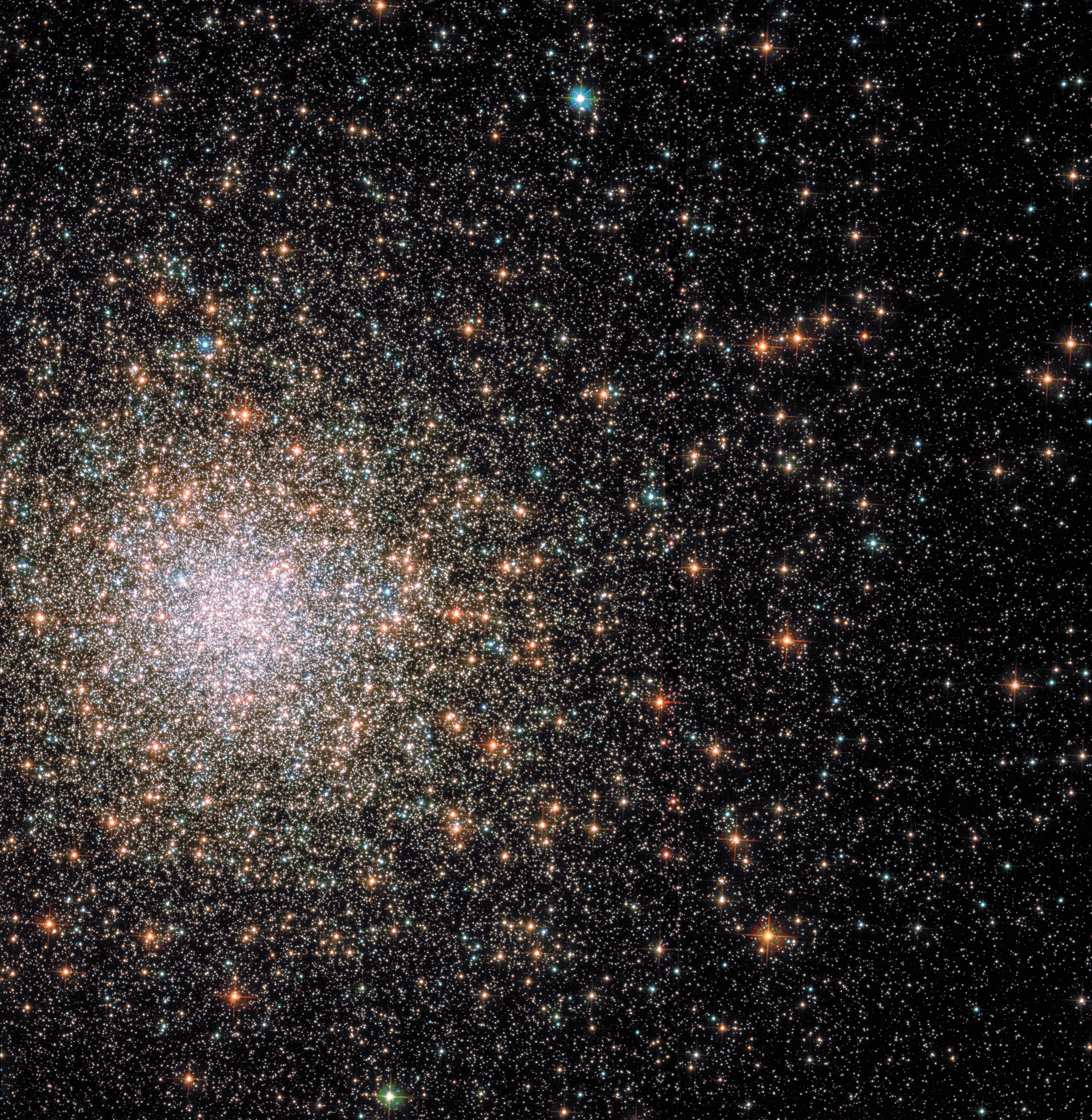
- Messier 62 by the Hubble Space Telescope

Observation data (J2000 epoch)
- Class: IV
- Constellation: Ophiuchus
- Right ascension: 17^{h} 01^{m} 12.60^{s}
- Declination: –30° 06′ 44.5″
- Distance: 21.5 ± 1.3 kly (6.6 ± 0.4 kpc)
- Apparent magnitude (V): 6.5
- Apparent dimensions (V): 15′

Physical characteristics
- Absolute magnitude: −9.18
- Mass: 1.22×10^{6} M_{☉}
- Radius: 48 ly
- Tidal radius: 59 ly.
- Metallicity: [Fe/H] = –1.02 dex
- Estimated age: 11.78 Gyr
- Other designations: C 1658-300, GCl 51, M62, NGC 6266

Messier 62 or M62, also known as NGC 6266 or the Flickering Globular Cluster, is a globular cluster of stars located in the south of the constellation of Ophiuchus. The cluster was discovered on 7 June 1771 by Charles Messier, who listed it as the 62nd entry in his catalogue published eight years later.

M62 is about 21.5 kly from Earth and 5.5 kly from the Galactic Center. It is among the most massive and luminous globular clusters in the Milky Way: its estimated mass is 1.22×10^{6} M_{☉}, its integrated absolute magnitude in the V band is −9.18., and therefore the mass-to-light ratio is 2.05±0.04. It has a projected ellipticity of 0.01, meaning it is essentially spherical. The density profile of its member stars suggests it has not yet undergone core collapse. It has a core radius of 1.3 ly (0.39 pc), a half-mass radius of 9.6 ly (2.95 pc), and a half-light radius of 6.0 ly (1.83 pc). The stellar density at the core is 5.13 M_{☉} per cubic parsec. It has a tidal radius of 59 ly (18.0 pc).

The cluster shows at least two distinct populations of stars, which most likely represent two separate episodes of star formation. Of the main sequence stars in the cluster, 79%±1% are from the first generation and 21%±1% from the second. The second is enriched by elements released by the first. In particular, abundances of helium, carbon, magnesium, aluminium, and sodium differ between these two.

Indications are this is an Oosterhoff type I, or "metal-rich" system. A 2010 study identified 245 variable stars in the cluster's field, of which 209 are RR Lyrae variables, four are Type II Cepheids, 25 are long period variables, and one is an eclipsing binary. The cluster may prove to be the galaxy's richest in terms of RR Lyrae variables. It has ten binary millisecond pulsars, including one (M62B) that is displaying eclipsing behavior from gas streaming off its companion, and one (M62H) with an orbiting exoplanet about three times the mass of Jupiter. There are multiple X-ray sources, including 50 within the half-mass radius. 47 blue straggler candidates have been identified, formed from the merger of two stars in a binary system, and these are preferentially concentrated near the core region.

It is hypothesized that this cluster may be host to an intermediate mass black hole (IMBH) – it is considered well-suited for searching for such an object. A brief study, before 2013, of the proper motion of stars within 17″ of the core did not require an IMBH to explain. However, simulations can not rule out one with a mass of a few thousand M_{☉} in M62's core. For example, based upon radial velocity measurements within an arcsecond of the core, Kiselev et al. (2008) made the claim of an IMBH in M15, likewise with mass of (1–9)×10^{3} M_{☉}.

== Gallery ==
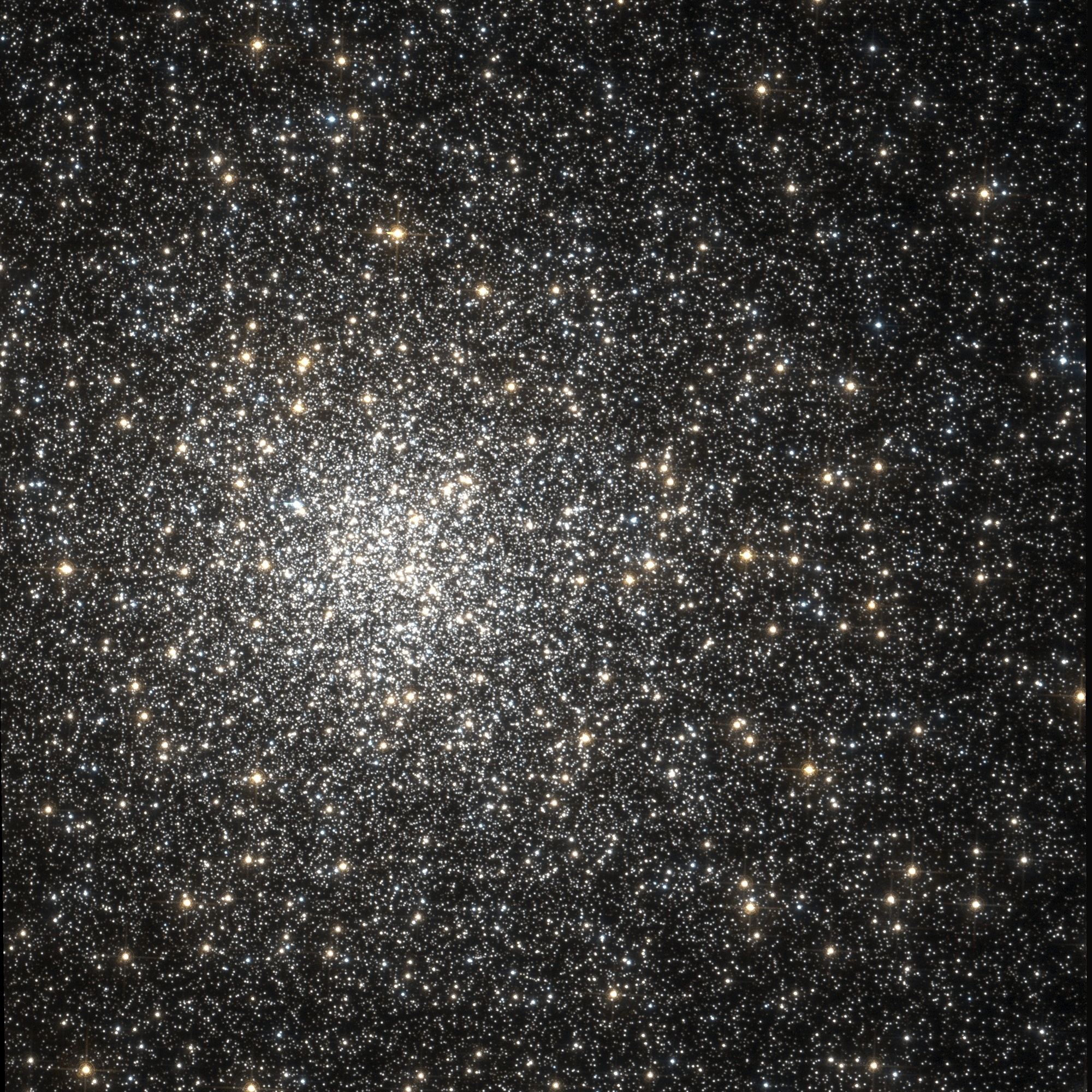
Messier 62 by the Hubble Space Telescope; 1.65′ field of view

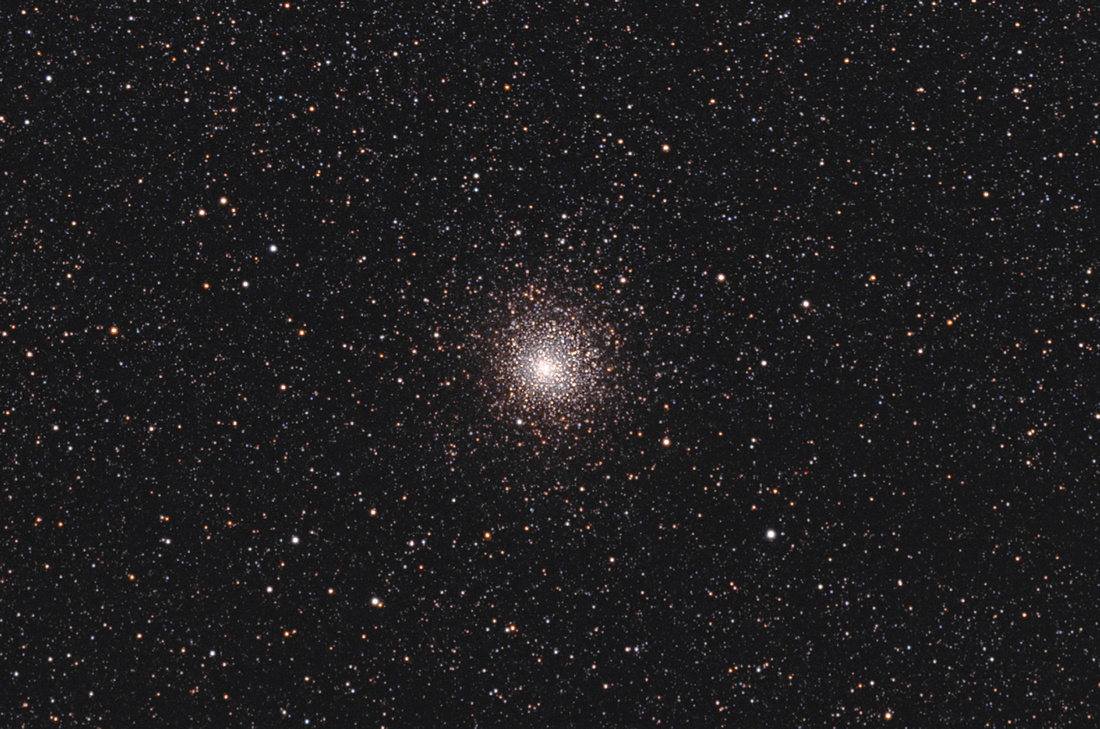
Globular Cluster M62 – wide field view

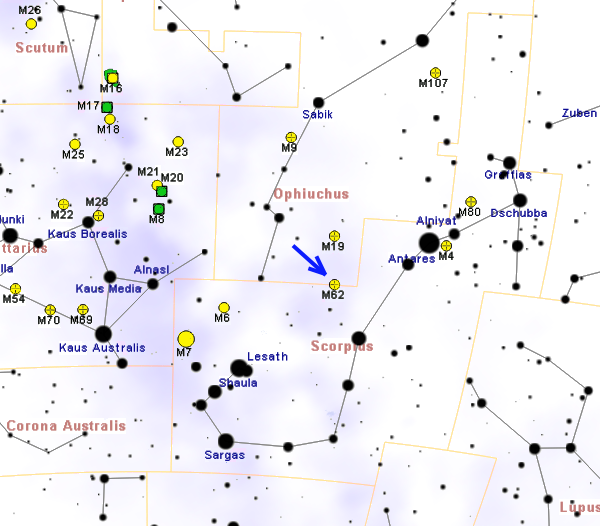
Map showing the location of M62

== See also ==
- List of Messier objects
