= MGC1 =

Globular cluster in the constellation of Pisces

Observation data (J2000 epoch)
- Constellation: Pisces
- Right ascension: 00^{h} 50^{m} 42.45^{s}
- Declination: +32° 54′ 58.70″
- Distance: 2.01 Mly (0.617 Mpc)
- Apparent magnitude (V): 15.50

Physical characteristics
- Tidal radius: 3900 ly (1200 pc)
- Metallicity: [Fe/H] = −1.3 dex
- Other designations: Bol 520, PGC 2017209

MGC1 is a globular cluster in the constellation of Pisces. It lies about 650,000 light-years (about 200 kpc) away from the Andromeda Galaxy (M 31)'s galactic center. MGC1 is considered as one of the most isolated globular clusters in the Local Group. The radial velocity of MGC1 is close to the systemic velocity of M 31 and likely within its escape velocity, therefore the cluster is likely gravitationally bound to it. Its absolute magnitude is −8.5.

This globular cluster was discovered in 2006 by a team led by Nicolas F. Martin, and named Martin-GC1 ("GC" stands for "globular cluster"), abbreviated to MGC1. It should not be confused with Mackey-GC1, another globular cluster in the Andromeda Galaxy, or with a star designated MGC 1.

In 2010, three astronomers (Charlie Conroy, Abraham Loeb and David Spergel) submitted an article to The Astrophysical Journal, explaining with evidence how the two globular clusters MGC1 and NGC 2419, another globular cluster 90,000 light-years (30 kpc) away from the center of the Milky Way Galaxy, did not have dark matter halos surrounding them.

In another article submitted to Science Magazine, it was explained that "Using data obtained by other astronomers, the team created computer models of what globular clusters should look like in the presence and absence of dark matter halos. Over time, clusters without dark matter slowly lose their gravitational grip on the stars at their edges, the team found, whereas those with halos hold onto these stars. Both NGC 2419 and MGC1 are missing stars at their fringes, leading the researchers to conclude that they formed in the absence of dark matter halos. The same may be true of most globular clusters in the local universe." This apparently proves that dark matter does not form all globular clusters, since the belief before this discovery was that dark matter helped form all globular clusters.
