= Messier 28 =

Globular cluster in the constellation of Sagittarius

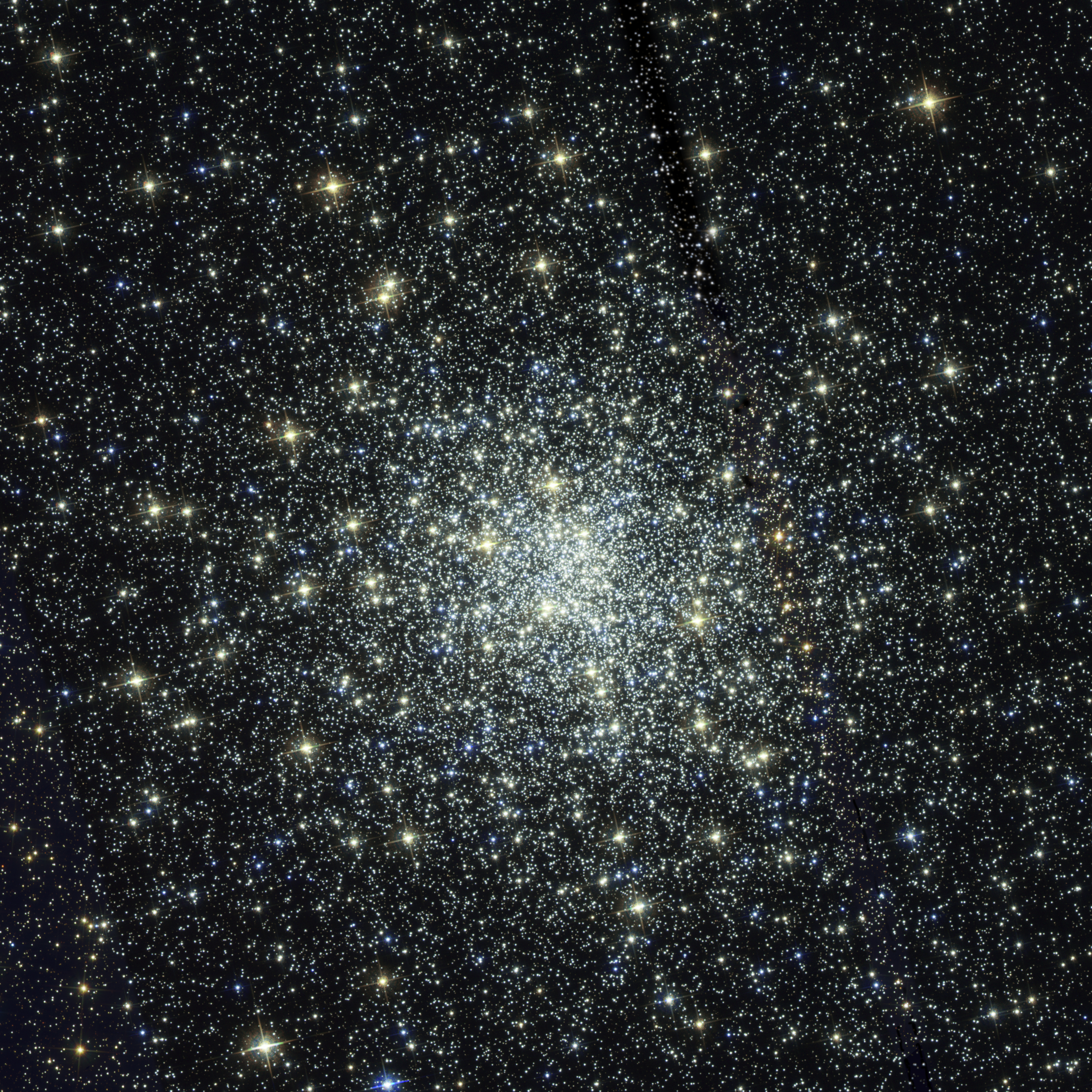
- Globular cluster Messier 28 in Sagittarius

Observation data (J2000 epoch)
- Class: IV
- Constellation: Sagittarius
- Right ascension: 18^{h} 24^{m} 32.89^{s}
- Declination: –24° 52′ 11.4″
- Distance: 18.26 ± 0.98 kly (5.6 ± 0.3 kpc)
- Apparent magnitude (V): 6.8
- Apparent dimensions (V): 11′.2

Physical characteristics
- Mass: 5.51×10^{5} M_{☉}
- Radius: 30 ly
- V_{HB}: 15.55 ± 0.10
- Metallicity: [Fe/H] = –1.32 dex
- Estimated age: 12.0 Gyr
- Notable features: Contains first pulsar discovered in a globular
- Other designations: GCl 94, M 28, NGC 6626

Messier 28 or M28, also known as NGC 6626, is a globular cluster of stars in the center-west of Sagittarius. It was discovered by French astronomer Charles Messier in 1764. (Note: On July 27) He briefly described it as a "nebula containing no star... round, seen with difficulty in 3 1/2-foot telescope; Diam 2′."

== Location ==
In the sky it is less than a degree to the northwest of the 3rd magnitude star Kaus Borealis (Lambda Sgr). This cluster is faintly visible as a hazy patch with a pair of binoculars and can be readily found in a small telescope with an 8 cm (3.1 in) aperture, showing as a nebulous feature spanning 11.2 arcminutes. Using an aperture of 15 cm (5.9 in), the core becomes visible and a few distinct stars can be resolved, along the periphery. Larger telescopes will provide greater resolution, one of 25 cm (9.8 in) revealing a dense 2′ core, with more density within.

It is about 18,300 light-years away from Earth. It is about 551000 M_{☉} and its metallicity (averaging −1.32 which means more than 10 times less than our own star), coherency and preponderence of older stellar evolution objects, support its dating to very roughly 12 billion years old. 18 RR Lyrae-type variable stars have been found within.

== Discovery ==
It bore the first discovery of a millisecond pulsar in a globular cluster – PSR B1821–24. This was using the Lovell Telescope at Jodrell Bank Observatory, England. A total of 11 further of these have since been detected in it with the telescope at Green Bank Observatory, West Virginia. As of 2011, these number the third-most in a cluster tied to the Milky Way, following Terzan 5 and 47 Tucanae.

== Gallery ==
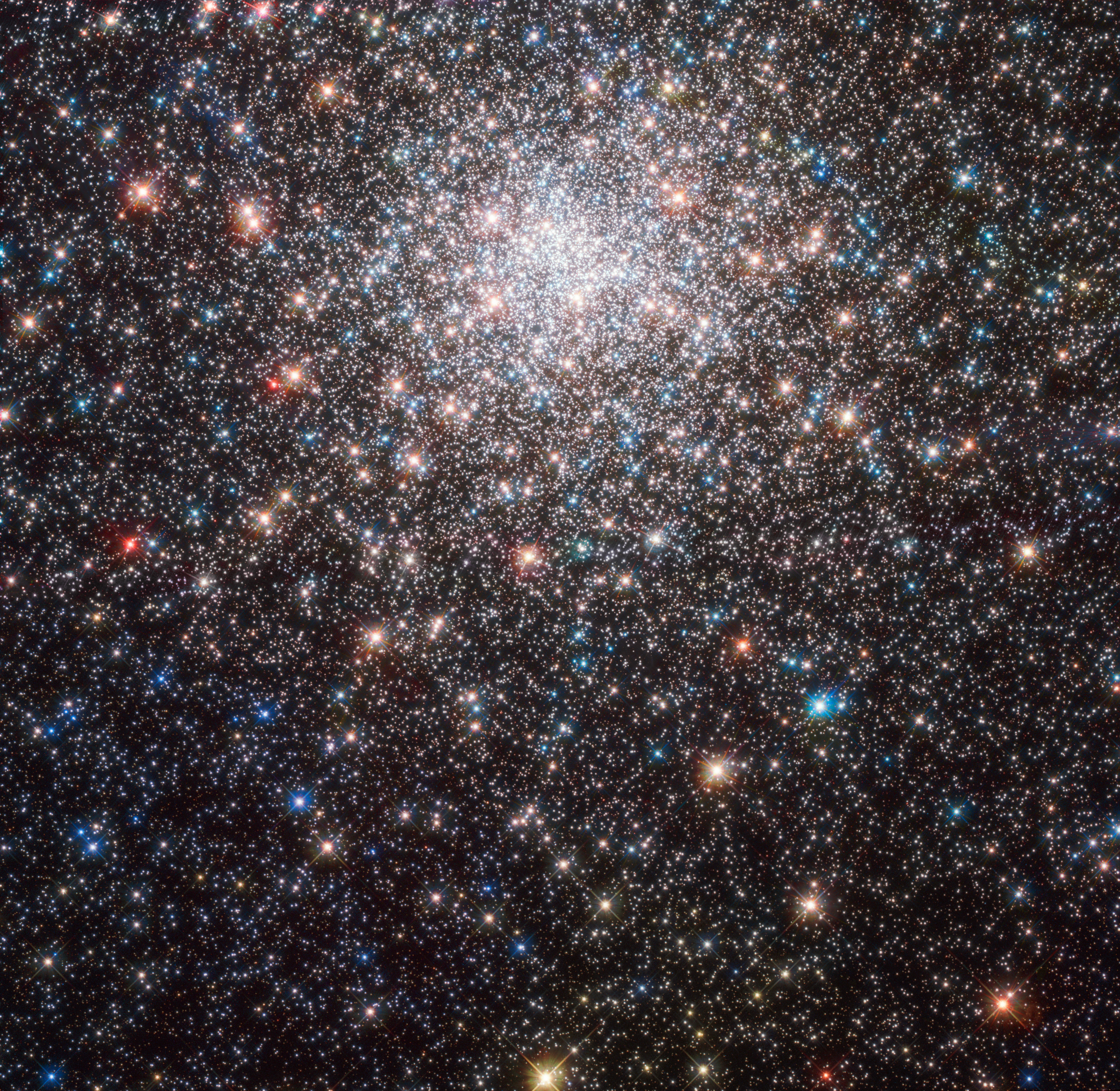
Messier 28 taken by Hubble.

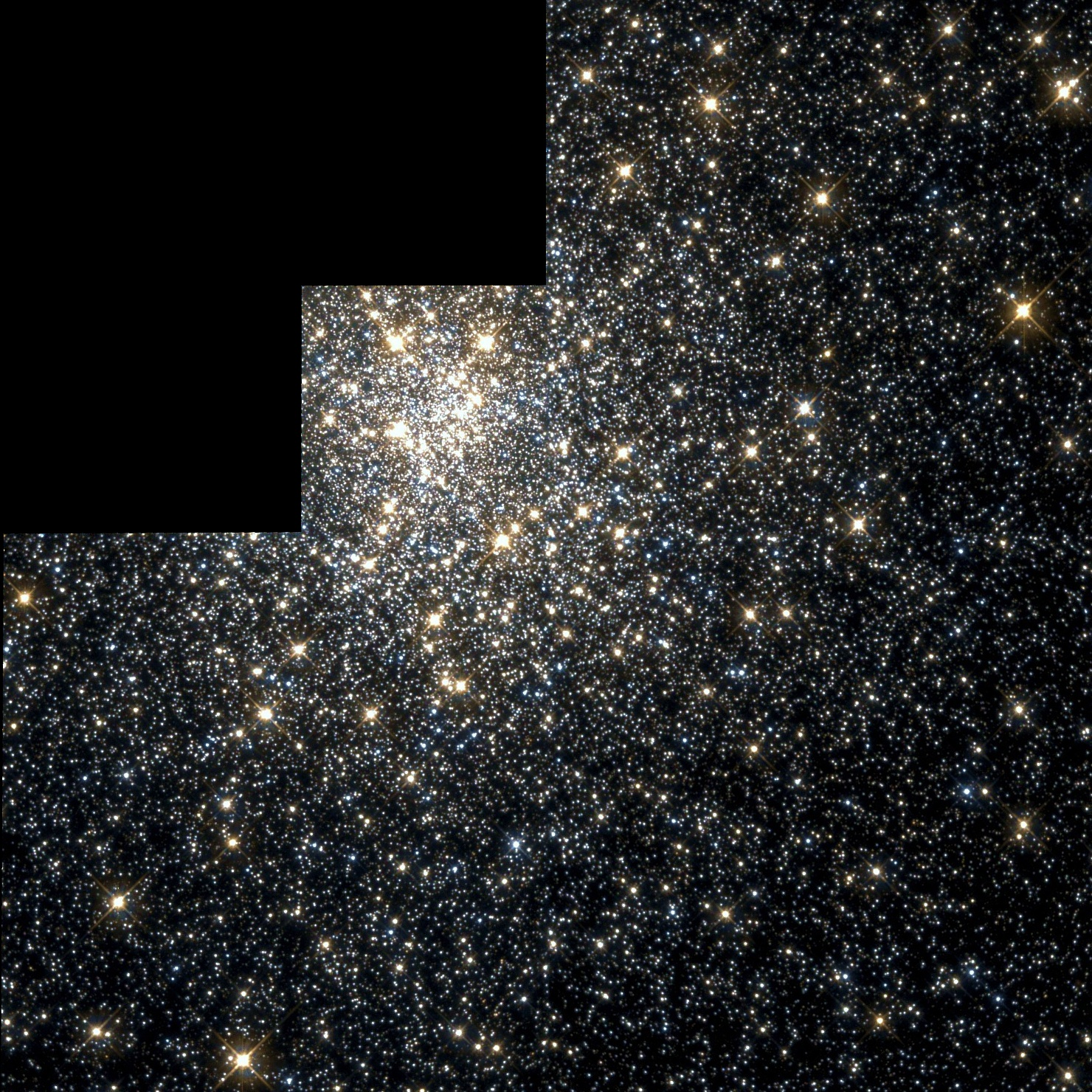
2.5' view of M28 taken by Hubble Space Telescope.

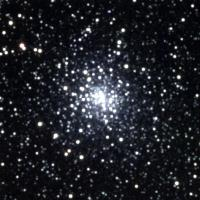
Messier 28 on 2MASS; wide angle

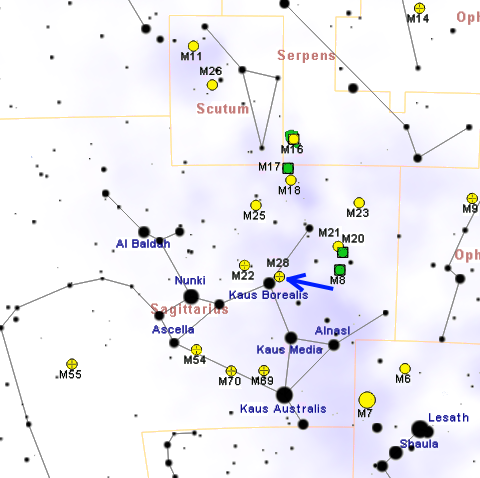
Map showing location of M28

== See also ==
- List of Messier objects
