= Messier 3 =

Globular cluster in the constellation Canes Venatici

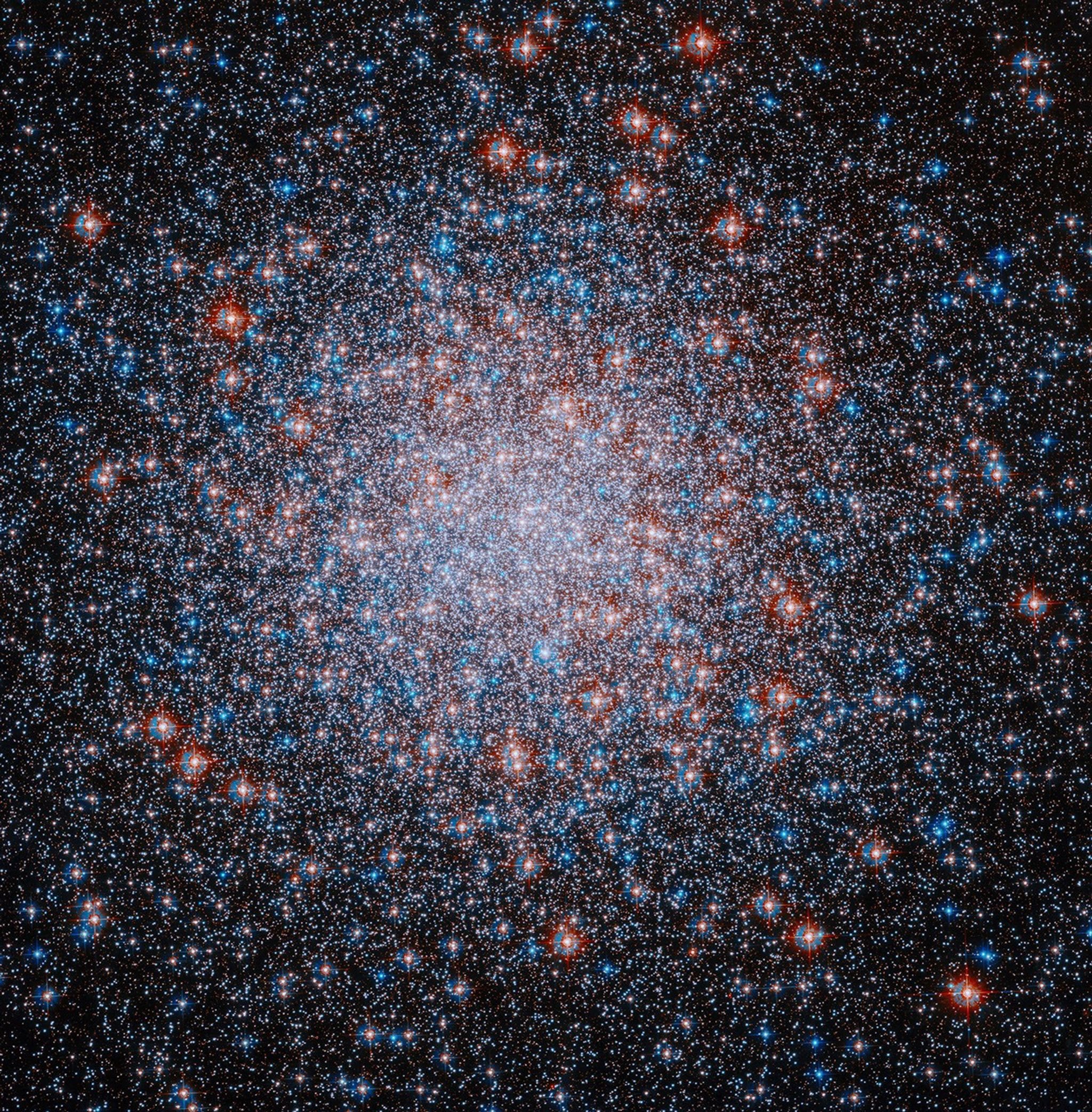
- Globular cluster Messier 3 imaged by Hubble Space Telescope

Observation data (J2000 epoch)
- Class: VI
- Constellation: Canes Venatici
- Right ascension: 13^{h} 42^{m} 11.62^{s}
- Declination: +28° 22′ 38.2″
- Distance: 33.9 kly (10.4 kpc)
- Apparent magnitude (V): 6.39
- Apparent dimensions (V): 18′.0

Physical characteristics
- Absolute magnitude: −8.93
- Mass: 4.5×10^{5} M_{☉}
- Radius: 103.0 pc (335.9 ly)
- Tidal radius: 113 pc (370 ly)^{[mean]}
- Metallicity: [Fe/H] = –1.34 dex
- Estimated age: 11.39 Gyr
- Other designations: NGC 5272

Messier 3 (M3; also NGC 5272) is a globular cluster located 33.9 thousand light years from Earth in the northern constellation of Canes Venatici. It is one of the largest and brightest globular clusters discovered with around 500,000 stars.

== Discovery ==
It was discovered on May 3, 1764, and was the first Messier object to be discovered by Charles Messier himself. Messier originally mistook the object for a nebula without stars. This mistake was corrected after the stars were resolved by William Herschel around 1784. Since then, it has become one of the best-studied globular clusters. Identification of the cluster's unusually large variable star population was begun in 1913 by American astronomer Solon Irving Bailey and new variable members continue to be identified up through 2025.

== Visibility ==
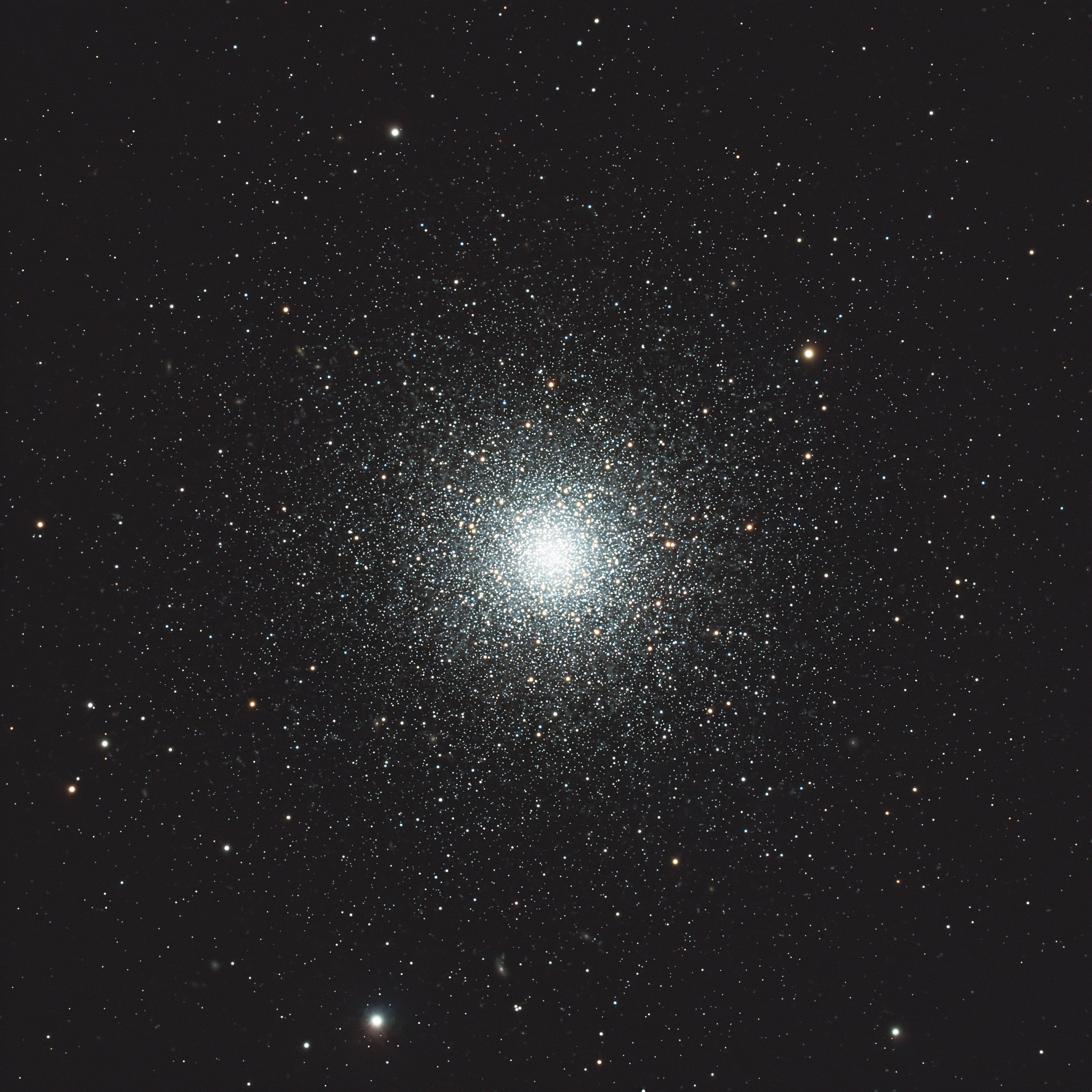
Messier 3 imaged with a Celestron 8"

Many amateur astronomers consider it one of the finest northern globular clusters, following only Messier 13. M3 has an apparent magnitude of 6.2, making it a difficult naked eye target even with dark conditions with averted vision. However, with a moderate-sized telescope, the cluster can be seen as a cloudy smudge even in severely light-polluted skies, and can be further defined in darker conditions. It can be found by looking almost exactly halfway along the north-west line that would join Arcturus (α Boötis) to Cor Caroli (α Canum Venaticorum). Using a telescope with a 25 cm (9.8 in) aperture, the cluster has a bright core with a diameter of about 6 arcminutes and spans a total of double that.

== Characteristics ==
This cluster is one of the largest and brightest, and is made up of around 500,000 stars. It is estimated to be 11.4 billion years old. It is centered at 32,600 light-years (10.0 kpc) away from Earth.

Messier 3 is quite isolated as it is 31.6 kly (9.7 kpc) above the Galactic plane and roughly 38.8 kly (11.9 kpc) from the center of the Milky Way. It contains 274 known variable stars, by far the most found in any globular cluster. These include 133 RR Lyrae variables, of which about a third display the Blazhko effect of long-period modulation. The overall abundance of elements other than hydrogen and helium, what astronomers term the metallicity, is in the range of −1.34 to −1.50 dex. This value gives the logarithm of the abundance relative to the Sun; the actual proportion is 3.2–4.6% of the solar abundance. Messier 3 is the prototype for the Oosterhoff type I cluster, which is considered "metal-rich". That is, for a globular cluster, Messier 3 has a relatively high abundance of heavier elements.

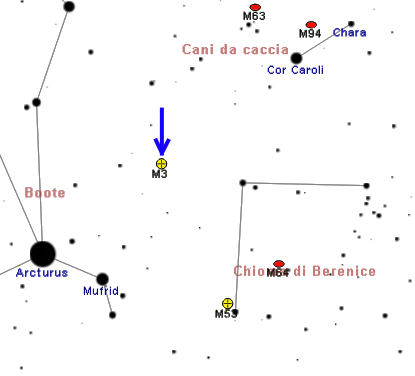
Arcturus and Cor Caroli can be used to help locate M3 (map in Italian)

== See also ==
- List of Messier objects
