= NGC 5053 =

Globular cluster in the constellation Coma Berenices

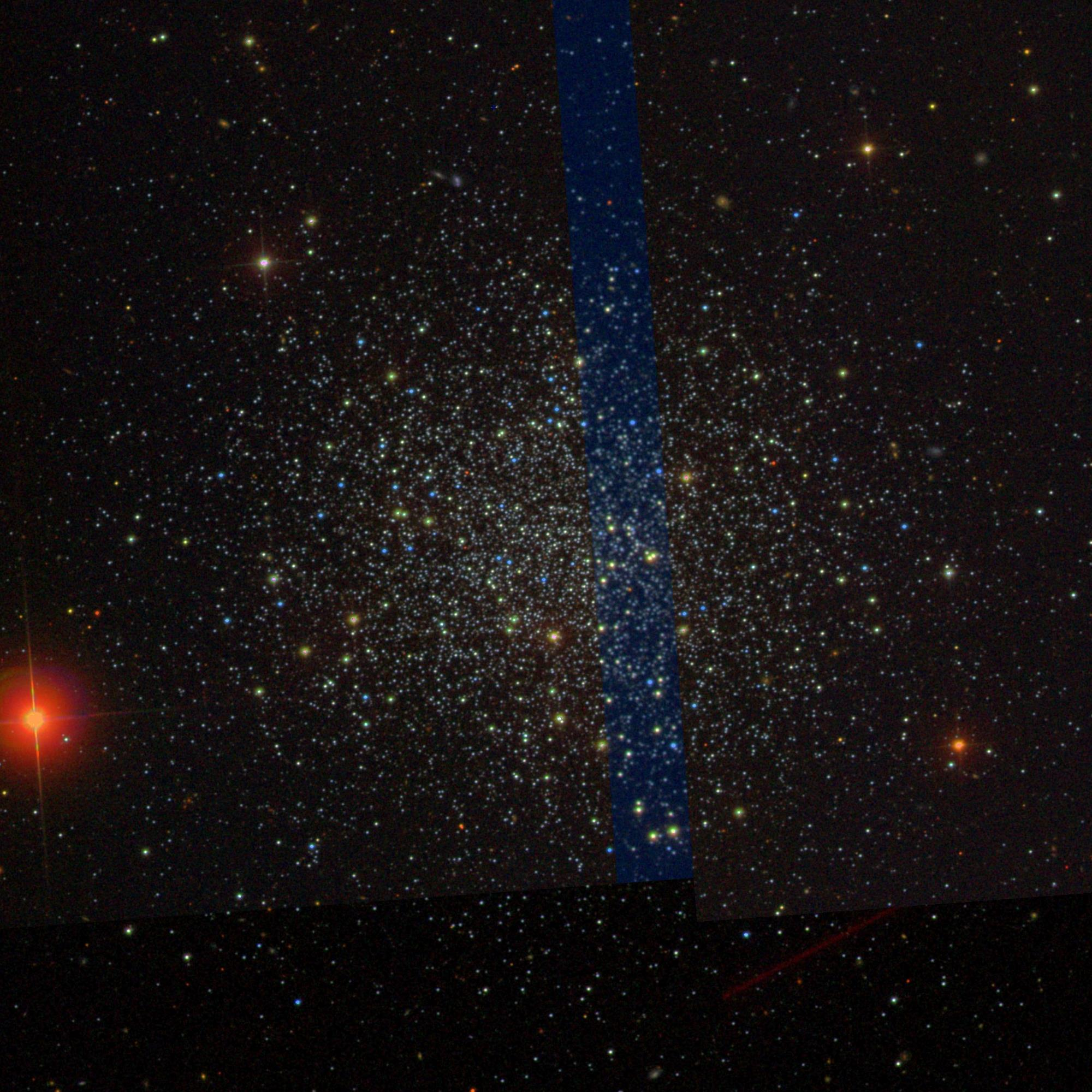

Observation data (J2000 epoch)
- Class: XI
- Constellation: Coma Berenices
- Right ascension: 13^{h} 16^{m} 27.09^{s}
- Declination: +17° 42′ 00.9″
- Distance: 17.4 kpc (57 kly)
- Apparent magnitude (V): 9.96
- Apparent dimensions (V): 10.5'

Physical characteristics
- Tidal radius: 89.13 pc (290.7 ly)
- Metallicity: [Fe/H] = −2.30 dex
- Estimated age: 12.3±0.7 Gyr
- Other designations: Cr 267, C 1313+179, GCl 23

NGC 5053 is a globular cluster in the northern constellation of Coma Berenices. It was discovered by German-British astronomer William Herschel on March 14, 1784 and cataloged as VI-7. In his abbreviated notation, he described it as "an extremely faint cluster of extremely small stars with resolvable nebula 8 or 10′ diameter, verified by a power of 240, beyond doubt". Danish-Irish astronomer John Louis Emil Dreyer reported in 1888 that the cluster appeared, "very faint, pretty large, irregular round shape, growing very gradually brighter at the middle".

This is a metal-poor cluster, meaning the stars have a low abundance of elements other than hydrogen and helium—what astronomers term metallicity. As recently as 1995, it was considered the most metal-poor globular cluster in the Milky Way. The chemical abundances of the stars in NGC 5053 are more similar to those in the dwarf galaxy Sagittarius Dwarf Spheroidal Galaxy than to the Milky Way halo. Along with the kinematics of the globular cluster, this suggests that NGC 5053 may have been stripped from the dwarf galaxy.

There are ten known RR Lyrae variable stars in this cluster with masses ranging from 68% to 78% of the solar mass. Nine of these variables were reported by German astronomer Walter Baade in 1928, and the tenth by American astronomer Helen Sawyer in 1946. The cluster hosts 27 known blue stragglers, of which five are short period SX Phoenicis variable stars.

NGC 5053 is a relatively low mass cluster with a low core concentration factor of 1.32. It sports a stream of tidal debris to the west with a projected length of 1.7 kpc. This stream may have been created through shock-induced processes. The cluster is located less than 1° from Messier 53 and the two have nearly the same distance modulus, which corresponds to a spatial separation of around 2 kpc. There is a tidal bridge joining M53 to NGC 5053, suggesting the pair may have interacted in the past. The cluster is following an orbit through the Milky Way that has a perigalacticon distance of 9 kpc and an orbital eccentricity of 0.84. At present, it is 18.4 kpc from the Galactic Center, with a radial velocity of 42.0±1.4 km/s.
