= Messier 4 =

Globular cluster in Scorpius

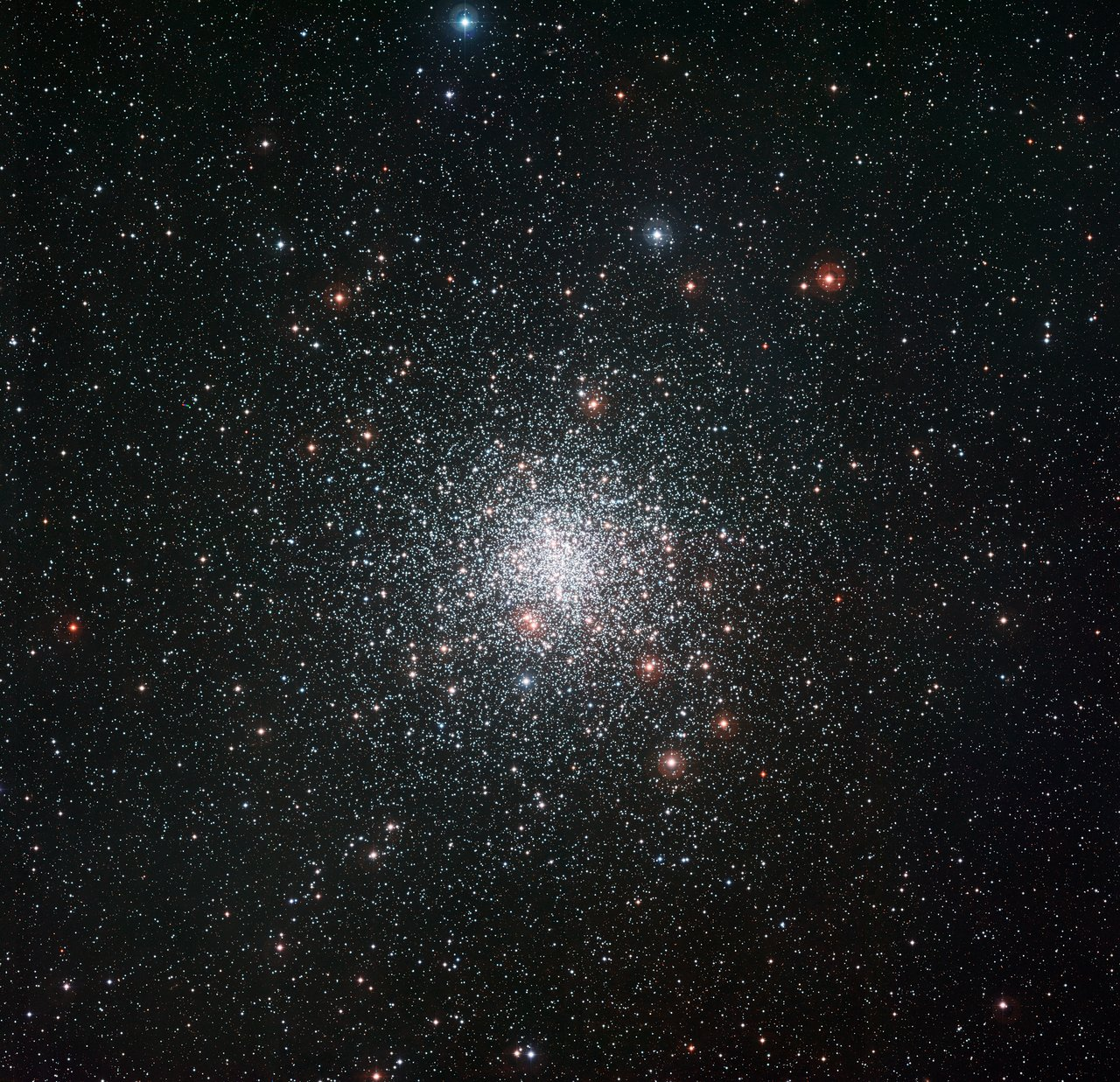
- Globular star cluster Messier 4

Observation data (J2000 epoch)
- Class: IX
- Constellation: Scorpius
- Right ascension: 16^{h} 23^{m} 35.22^{s}
- Declination: −26° 31′ 32.7″
- Distance: 6.033 kly (1.850 kpc)
- Apparent magnitude (V): 5.6
- Apparent dimensions (V): 26′.0

Physical characteristics
- Mass: 8.4×10^{4} M_{☉}
- Radius: 35 light-years
- Metallicity: [Fe/H] = −1.07 dex
- Estimated age: (12.2 ± 0.2) Gyr
- Notable features: Closest globular cluster
- Other designations: NGC 6121

Messier 4 or M4 (also known as NGC 6121 or the Spider Globular Cluster) is a globular cluster in the constellation of Scorpius. It was discovered by Philippe Loys de Chéseaux in 1745 and catalogued by Charles Messier in 1764. It was the first globular cluster in which individual stars were resolved.

== Visibility ==
M4 is conspicuous in even the smallest of telescopes as a fuzzy ball of light. It appears about the same size as the Moon in the sky. It is one of the easiest globular clusters to find, being located only 1.3 degrees west of the bright star Antares, with both objects being visible in a wide-field telescope. Modestly sized telescopes will begin to resolve individual stars, of which the brightest in M4 are of apparent magnitude 10.8.

== Characteristics ==
M4 is a rather loosely concentrated cluster of class IX and measures 75 light-years across. It features a characteristic "bar" structure across its core, visible to moderate sized telescopes. The structure consists of 11th-magnitude stars and is approximately 2.5′ long and was first noted by William Herschel in 1783. At least 43 variable stars have been observed within M4.

M4 is approximately 6,000 light-years away, making it the closest globular cluster to the Solar System. It has an estimated age of 12.2 billion years.

In astronomy, the abundance of elements other than hydrogen and helium is called the metallicity, and it is usually denoted by the abundance ratio of iron to hydrogen as compared to the Sun. For this cluster, the measured abundance of iron is equal to [Fe/H] = −1.07±0.1. This value is the logarithm of the ratio of iron to hydrogen relative to the same ratio in the Sun. Thus the cluster has an abundance of iron equal to 8.5% of the iron abundance in the Sun. This strongly suggests this cluster hosts two distinct stellar populations, differing by age. Thus the cluster probably saw two main cycles or phases of star formation.

The space velocity components are (U, V, W) = (−57±3, −193±22, −8±5) km/s. This confirms an orbit around the Milky Way of a period of (116±3) million years with eccentricity 0.80±0.03: during periapsis it comes within (0.6 ± 0.1) kpc from the galactic core, while at apoapsis it travels out to (5.9±0.3) kpc. The inclination is at (an angle of) 23°±6° from the galactic plane, thus it reaches as much as (1.5±0.4) kpc above the disk. When passing through the disk, this cluster does so at less than 5 kpc from the galactic nucleus. The cluster undergoes tidal shock during each passage, which can cause the repeated shedding of stars. Thus the cluster may have been much more massive.

== Notable stars ==
Photographs by the Hubble Space Telescope in 1995 found white dwarf stars in M4 that are among the oldest known stars in our galaxy; aged 13 billion years. One has been found to be a binary star with a pulsar companion, PSR B1620−26 and a planet orbiting it with a mass of 2.5 times that of Jupiter (M_{J}). One star in Messier 4 was also found to have much more of the rare light element lithium than expected.

CX-1 Is located in M4. It is known as a possible millisecond pulsar/neutron star binary. It orbits in 6.31 hours.

== Spinthariscope analogy ==
The view of Messier 4 through a good telescope was likened by Robert Burnham Jr. to that of hyperkinetic luminous alpha particles seen in a spinthariscope.

== Central black hole ==
Simulation of stellar motions in Messier 4, where astronomers suspect that an intermediate-mass black hole could be present. If confirmed, the black hole would be in the center of the cluster, and would have a sphere of influence (black hole) limited by the red circle.

In 2023, an analysis of Hubble Space Telescope and European Space Agency's Gaia spacecraft data from Messier 4 revealed an excess mass of roughly 800 solar masses in the center of this cluster, which appears to not be extended. This could thus be considered as kinematic evidence for an intermediate-mass black hole (even if an unusually compact cluster of compact objects like white dwarfs, neutron stars or stellar-mass black holes cannot be completely discounted).

== See also ==
- List of Messier objects
