= Sphere of influence (disambiguation) =

A sphere of influence is a spatial region over which a state or organization has a level of exclusivity.

Sphere of influence may also refer to:

== Science ==
- Sphere of influence (astrodynamics), the region around a celestial body in which that body is the biggest gravitational influence
  - Sphere of influence (black hole), the region around a supermassive black hole

== Other uses ==
- "Sphere of influence", in planning settlement hierarchy
- Nobunaga's Ambition: Sphere of Influence, a Japanese video game in the Nobunaga's Ambition series
- "Sphere of Influence" (Star Wars: The Clone Wars), an episode of the television series
