= Johann Abraham Ihle =

German astronomer

- Born: 14 June 1627; Leipzig
- Died: C. 1699; Leipzig
- Occupations: Postal Clerk; Amateur Astronomer
- Years active: C. 1665-1695 (Astronomy)
- Known for: Discovery of Messier 22

Johann Abraham Ihle (14 June 1627 – c.1699) was a German amateur astronomer from Leipzig.

== Biography ==
Ihle was born on the 14th of June, 1627, in Leipzig. Ihle would continue to live in the city for the remainder of his life. Professionally, Ihle was a postal clerk. He died either in 1699 or shortly after.

== Astronomy ==
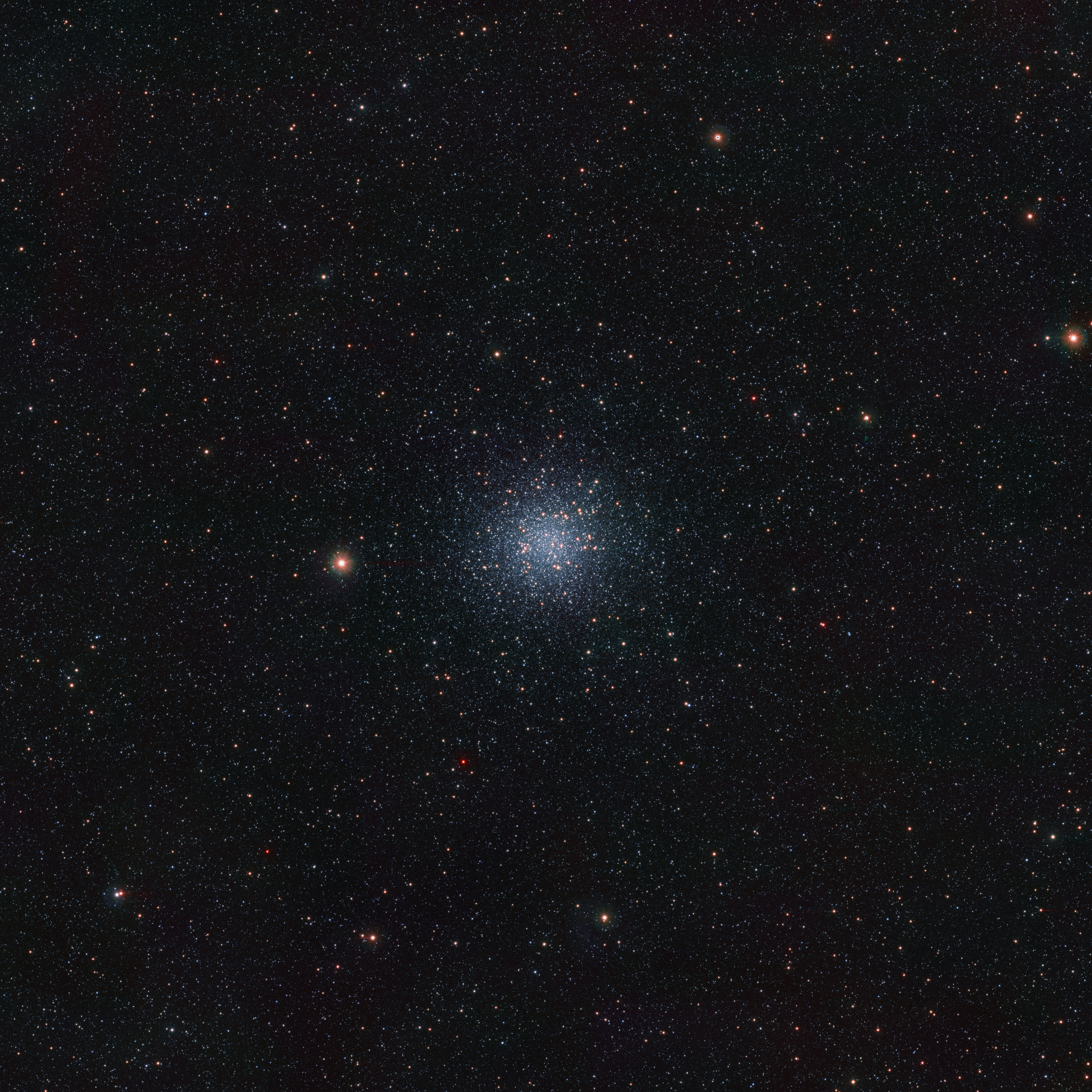
The Globular Cluster Messier 22

He is most famous for his discovery the first known globular cluster, M22, on 26 August 1665 while observing Saturn in Sagittarius. He observed it with a small refractor telescope. He misidentified it as a nebula, as the true nature of what a globular cluster was would not begin to be understood until Charles Messier's observations of Messier 4 in 1764. He initially described it as "composite nebula between the head and the bow of the archer onto which a great number of faint stars was projected".

Astronomer William Henry Smyth has suggested that a British astronomer named Abraham Hill may be the true discoverer of M22, however this claim has been rejected by astronomers as nothing but speculation on Smyth's part.

He was friends of Gottfried Kirch and Johannes Hevelius. He was also in contact with Erhard Weigel.

He observed sunspots in the 1680s. He is considered a member of the "red list" for sunspot observation, composed of those who collectively constructed a day-by-day record of changes to sunspots in the 1660s, 1670s, and 1680s. Also included in this list are Hevelius, John Flamsteed, and Jonas Moore.

He continued to do astronomy, in close contact with other astronomers he knew, mostly Kirch, until 1695 when he retired at the age of 68.
