= Globular cluster =

Spherical collection of stars

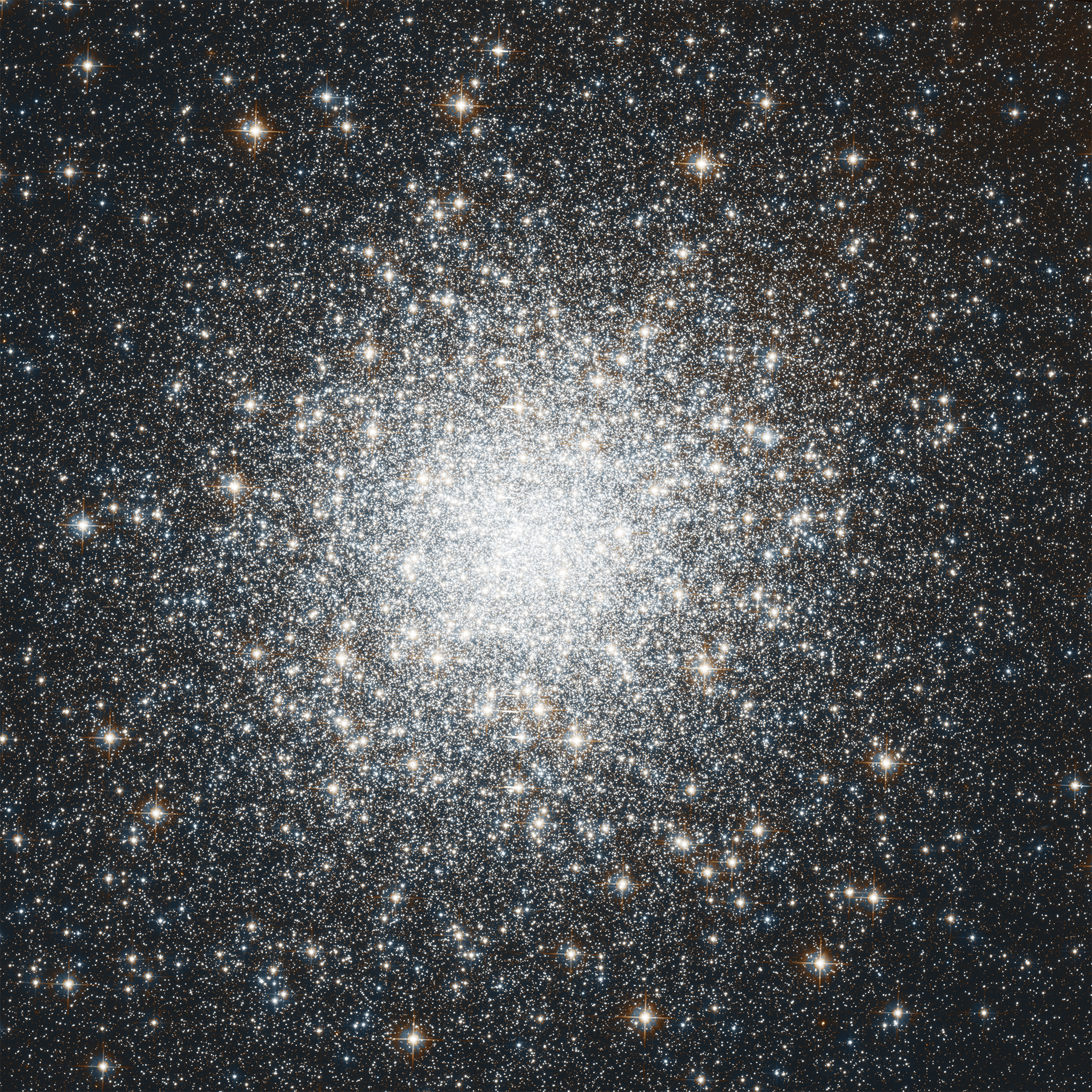
- Messier 2

Characteristics
- Type: Star cluster
- Mass range: 1K M_{☉} - >1M M_{☉}
- Size range: 10-300 ly across
- Density: ~2 stars/cubic ly
- Average luminosity: ~25 000 L_{☉}

External links
- Media category
- Q11276

Additional Information
- Discovered: Abraham Ihle, 1665

A globular cluster is a spheroidal conglomeration of stars that is bound together by gravity, with a higher concentration of stars towards its center. It can contain anywhere from tens of thousands to many millions of member stars, all orbiting in a stable, compact formation. This contrasts with open clusters, where the stars are only loosely bound and more easily disrupted. Globular clusters are similar in form to dwarf spheroidal galaxies, and though globular clusters were long held to be the more luminous of the two, discoveries of outliers had made the distinction between the two less clear by the early 21st century. Their name is derived from Latin globulus (small sphere). Globular clusters are occasionally known simply as "globulars".

Although one globular cluster, Omega Centauri, was observed in antiquity and long thought to be a star, recognition of the clusters' true nature came with the advent of telescopes in the 17th century. In early telescopic observations, globular clusters appeared as fuzzy blobs, leading French astronomer Charles Messier to include many of them in his catalog of astronomical objects that he thought could be mistaken for comets. Using larger telescopes, 18th-century astronomers recognized that globular clusters are groups of many individual stars. Early in the 20th century the distribution of globular clusters in the sky was some of the first evidence that the Sun is far from the center of the Milky Way.

Globular clusters are found in nearly all galaxies. In spiral galaxies like the Milky Way, they are mostly found in the outer spheroidal part of the galaxy – the galactic halo. They are the largest and most massive type of star cluster, tending to be older, denser, and composed of lower abundances of heavy elements than open clusters, which are generally found in the disks of spiral galaxies. The Milky Way has over 150 known globulars, and there may be more.

Both the origin of globular clusters and their role in galactic evolution are unclear. Some are among the oldest objects in their galaxies and even the universe, constraining estimates of the universe's age. Globular clusters were formerly thought to consist of stars that all formed at the same time from one star-forming nebula, but nearly all globular clusters contain stars that formed at different times, or that have differing compositions. Some clusters may have had multiple episodes of star formation, and some may be remnants of smaller galaxies captured by larger galaxies.

== History of observations ==
The first known globular cluster, now called M22, was discovered in 1665 by Abraham Ihle, a German amateur astronomer. The cluster Omega Centauri, easily visible in the southern sky with the naked eye, was known to ancient astronomers like Ptolemy as a star, but was reclassified as a nebula by Edmond Halley in 1677, then finally as a globular cluster in the early 19th century by John Herschel. The French astronomer Abbé Lacaille listed NGC 104, NGC 4833, M55, M69, and NGC 6397 in his 1751–1752 catalogue. (Note: The label M before a number refers to Charles Messier's catalogue, while NGC is from the New General Catalogue by John Dreyer.) The low resolution of early telescopes prevented individual stars in a cluster from being visually separated until Charles Messier observed M4 in 1764. (Note: From page 437: Le 8 Mai 1764, j'ai découvert une nébuleuse ... de 25^{d} 55′ 40″ méridionale. "On 8 May 1764, I discovered a nebula near Antares, and on its parallel; it is a [source of] light which has little extension, which is dim, and which is seen with difficulty; by using a good telescope to see it, one perceives very small stars in it. Its right ascension was determined to be 242° 16′ 56″, and its declination, 25° 55′ 40″ south.")

Early globular cluster discoveries
Cluster name	Discovered by	Year
M 22	Abraham Ihle	1665
ω Cen (Note: Omega Centauri was known in antiquity, but Halley discovered its nature as a nebula.)	Edmond Halley	1677
M 5	Gottfried Kirch	1702
M 13	Edmond Halley	1714
M 71	Philippe Loys de Chéseaux	1745
M 4	Philippe Loys de Chéseaux	1746
M 15	Jean-Dominique Maraldi	1746
M 2	Jean-Dominique Maraldi	1746

When William Herschel began his comprehensive survey of the sky using large telescopes in 1782, there were 34 known globular clusters. Herschel discovered another 36 and was the first to resolve virtually all of them into stars. He coined the term globular cluster in his Catalogue of a Second Thousand New Nebulae and Clusters of Stars (1789). (Note: From page 218, discussing the shapes of star clusters, Herschel wrote: "And thus, from the above-mentioned appearances, we come to know that there are globular clusters of stars nearly equal in size, which are scattered evenly at equal distances from the middle, but with an encreasing [sic] accumulation towards the center.") In 1914, Harlow Shapley began a series of studies of globular clusters, published across about forty scientific papers. He examined the clusters' RR Lyrae variables (stars which he assumed were Cepheid variables) and used their luminosity and period of variability to estimate the distances to the clusters. RR Lyrae variables were later found to be fainter than Cepheid variables, causing Shapley to overestimate the distances.

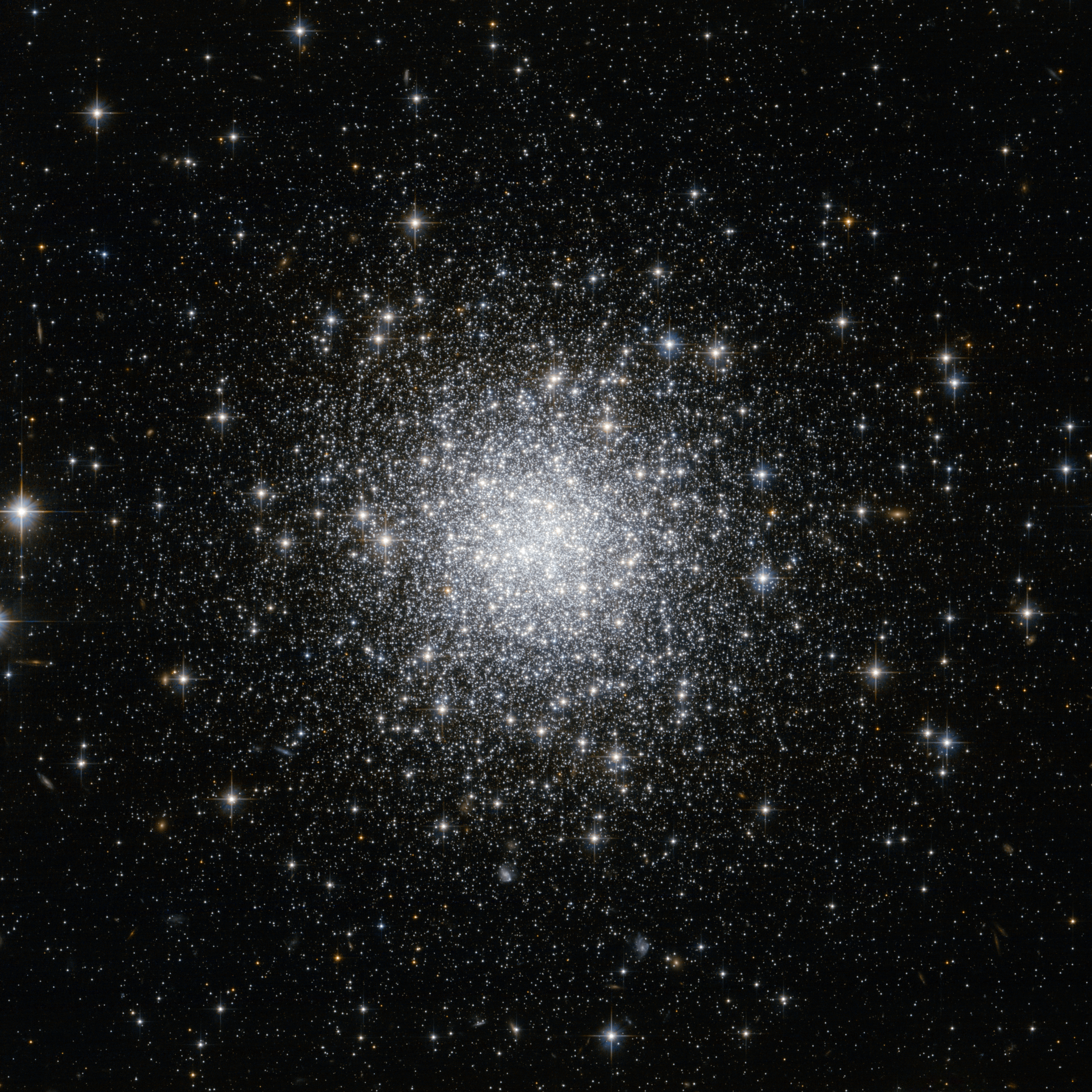
NGC 7006 is a highly concentrated, Class I globular cluster.

A large majority of the Milky Way's globular clusters are found in the halo around the galactic core. In 1918, Shapley used this strongly asymmetrical distribution to determine the overall dimensions of the galaxy. Assuming a roughly spherical distribution of globular clusters around the galaxy's center, he used the positions of the clusters to estimate the position of the Sun relative to the Galactic Center. He correctly concluded that the Milky Way's center is in the constellation Sagittarius and not near the Solar System. He overestimated the distance, finding typical globular cluster distances of 10–30 kiloparsecs (33,000–98,000 ly); the modern distance to the Galactic Center is roughly 8.5 kiloparsecs (28,000 ly). (Note: Harlow Shapley's error was aggravated by interstellar dust in the Milky Way, which absorbs and diminishes the amount of light from distant objects (such as globular clusters), thus making them appear to be farther away.) Shapley's measurements indicated the Sun is relatively far from the center of the galaxy, contrary to what had been inferred from the observed uniform distribution of ordinary stars. In reality most ordinary stars lie within the galaxy's disk and are thus obscured by gas and dust in the disk, whereas globular clusters lie outside the disk and can be seen at much greater distances.

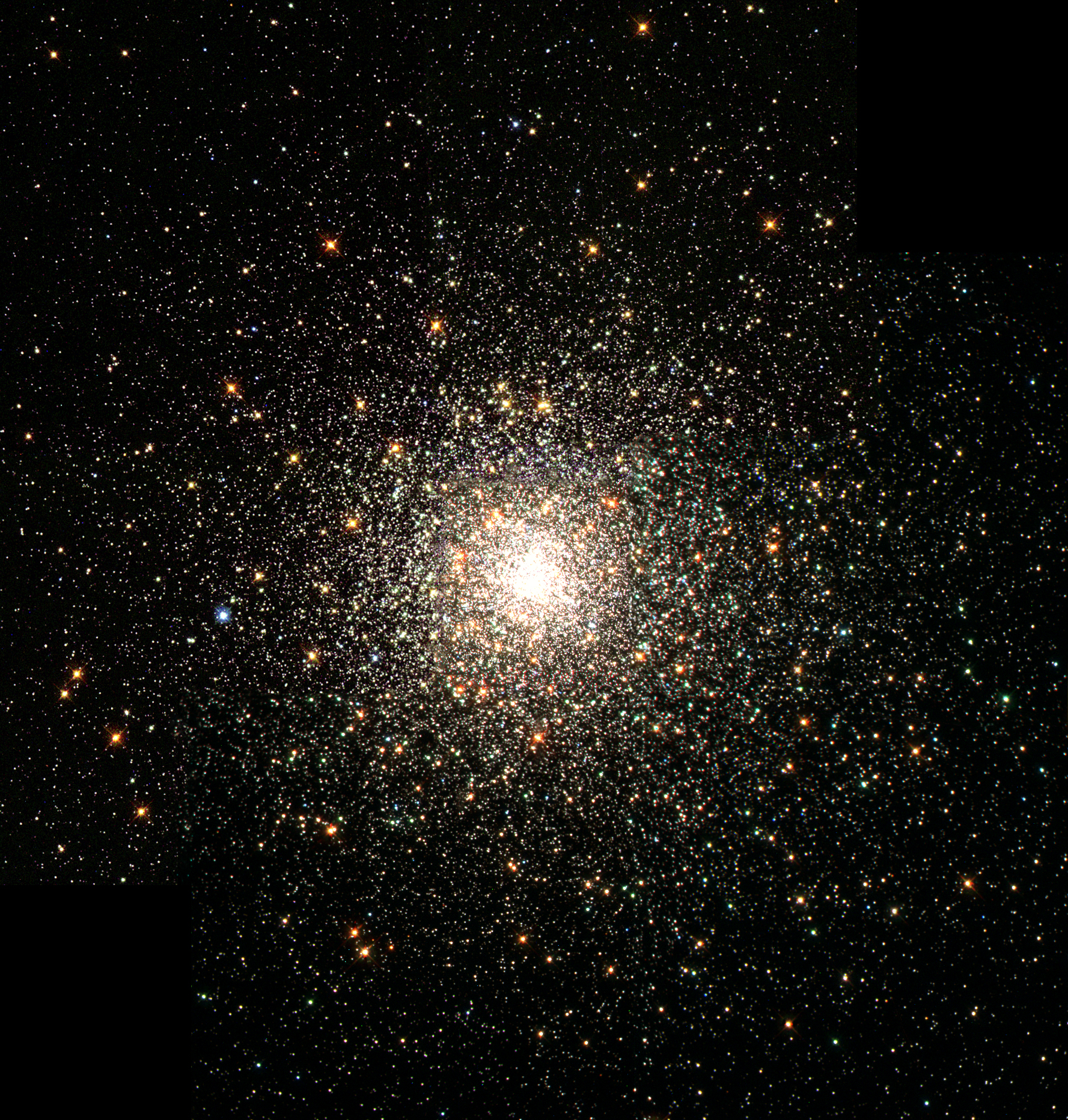
The Messier 80 globular cluster in the constellation Scorpius is located about 30,000 light-years from the Sun and contains hundreds of thousands of stars.

The count of known globular clusters in the Milky Way has continued to increase, reaching 83 in 1915, 93 in 1930, 97 by 1947, and 157 in 2010. The number of known globular clusters in the Milky Way reached 158 by the end of 2010, according to the European Southern Observatory, before two new globular clusters were discovered as part of the ESO's VISTA (Visible and Infrared Survey Telescope for Astronomy) infrared survey, known as Variables in the Vía Láctea (VVV) survey, bringing the total to 160 known globular clusters. The two discovered by VISTA in 2011 are named VVV CL001 and VVV CL002.

Additional, undiscovered globular clusters are believed to be in the galactic bulge or hidden by the gas and dust of the Milky Way. For example, most of the Palomar Globular Clusters have only been discovered in the 1950s, with some located relatively close-by yet obscured by dust, while others reside in the very far reaches of the Milky Way halo. The Andromeda Galaxy, which is comparable in size to the Milky Way, may have as many as five hundred globulars. Every galaxy of sufficient mass in the Local Group has an associated system of globular clusters, as does almost every large galaxy surveyed. Some giant elliptical galaxies (particularly those at the centers of galaxy clusters), such as M87, have as many as 13,000 globular clusters.

=== Classification ===
Shapley was later assisted in his studies of clusters by Henrietta Swope and Helen Sawyer Hogg. In 1927–1929, Shapley and Sawyer categorized clusters by the degree of concentration of stars toward each core. Their system, known as the Shapley–Sawyer Concentration Class, identifies the most concentrated clusters as Class I and ranges to the most diffuse Class XII. (Note: The Concentration Class is sometimes given with Arabic numerals (Classes 1–12) rather than Roman numerals.) Astronomers from the Pontifical Catholic University of Chile proposed a new type of globular cluster on the basis of observational data in 2015: Dark globular clusters.

== Formation ==
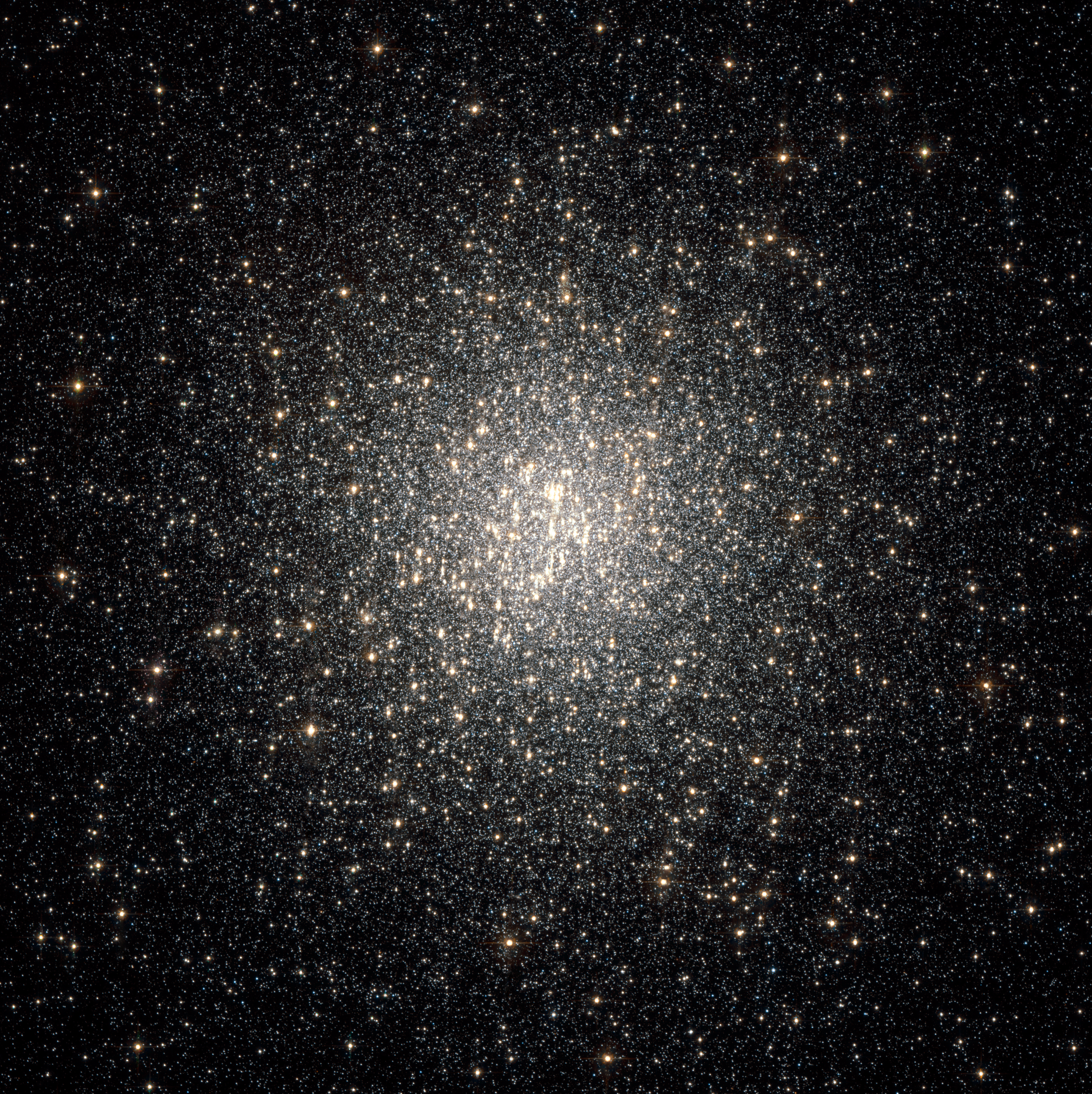
NGC 2808 contains three distinct generations of stars. NASA image

The formation of globular clusters is poorly understood. Globular clusters have traditionally been described as a simple star population formed from a single giant molecular cloud, and thus with roughly uniform age and metallicity (proportion of heavy elements in their composition). Modern observations show that nearly all globular clusters contain multiple populations; the globular clusters in the Large Magellanic Cloud (LMC) exhibit a bimodal population, for example. During their youth, these LMC clusters may have encountered giant molecular clouds that triggered a second round of star formation. This star-forming period is relatively brief, compared with the age of many globular clusters. It has been proposed that this multiplicity in stellar populations could have a dynamical origin. In the Antennae Galaxy, for example, the Hubble Space Telescope has observed clusters of clusters – regions in the galaxy that span hundreds of parsecs, in which many of the clusters will eventually collide and merge. Their overall range of ages and (possibly) metallicities could lead to clusters with a bimodal, or even multimodal, distribution of populations.

Globular star cluster Messier 54

Observations of globular clusters show that their stars primarily come from regions of more efficient star formation, and from where the interstellar medium is at a higher density, as compared to normal star-forming regions. Globular cluster formation is prevalent in starburst regions and in interacting galaxies. Some globular clusters likely formed in dwarf galaxies and were removed by tidal forces to join the Milky Way. In elliptical and lenticular galaxies there is a correlation between the mass of the supermassive black holes (SMBHs) at their centers and the extent of their globular cluster systems. The mass of the SMBH in such a galaxy is often close to the combined mass of the galaxy's globular clusters.

No known globular clusters display active star formation, consistent with the hypothesis that globular clusters are typically the oldest objects in their galaxy and were among the first collections of stars to form. Very large regions of star formation known as super star clusters, such as Westerlund 1 in the Milky Way, may be the precursors of globular clusters.

Many of the Milky Way's globular clusters have a retrograde orbit (meaning that they revolve around the galaxy in the reverse of the direction the galaxy is rotating), including the most massive, Omega Centauri. Its retrograde orbit suggests it may be a remnant of a dwarf galaxy captured by the Milky Way.

== Composition ==
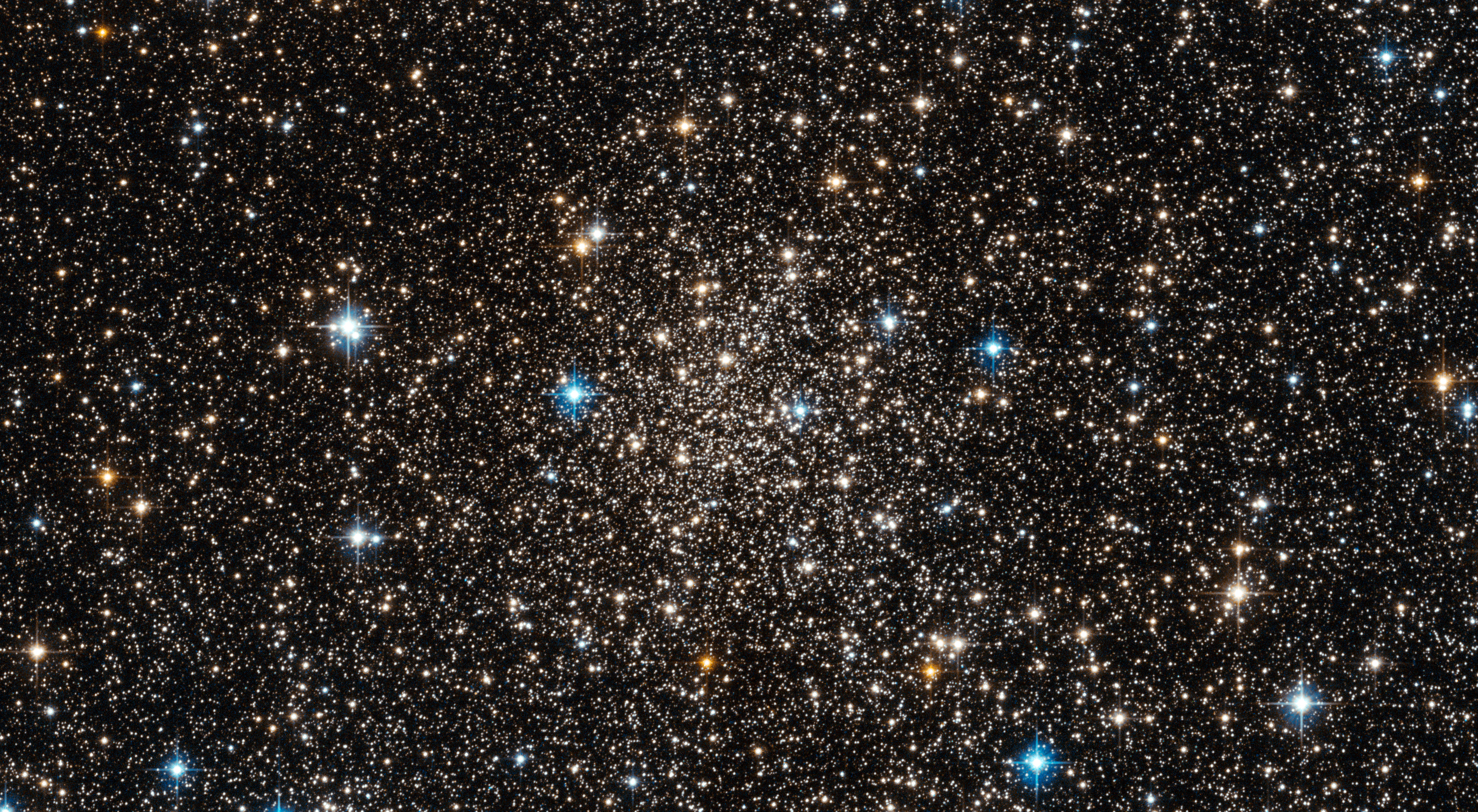
Djorgovski 1's stars contain hydrogen and helium, but not much else. In astronomical terms they are metal-poor.

Globular clusters are generally composed of hundreds of thousands of low-metal, old stars. The stars found in a globular cluster are similar to those in the bulge of a spiral galaxy but confined to a spheroid in which half the light is emitted within a radius of only a few to a few tens of parsecs. They are free of gas and dust, and it is presumed that all the gas and dust was long ago either turned into stars or blown out of the cluster by the massive first-generation stars.

Globular clusters can contain a high density of stars; on average about 0.4 stars per cubic parsec, increasing to 100 or 1000 stars/pc^{3} in the core of the cluster. In comparison, the stellar density around the Sun is roughly 0.1 stars/pc^{3}. The typical distance between stars in a globular cluster is about one light year, but at its core the separation between stars averages about a third of a light year – thirteen times closer than the Sun is to its nearest neighbor, Proxima Centauri.

Globular clusters are thought to be unfavorable locations for planetary systems. Planetary orbits are dynamically unstable within the cores of dense clusters because of the gravitational perturbations of passing stars. A planet orbiting at one astronomical unit around a star that is within the core of a dense cluster, such as 47 Tucanae, would survive only on the order of a hundred million years. There is a planetary system orbiting a pulsar (PSR B1620−26) that belongs to the globular cluster M4, but these planets likely formed after the event that created the pulsar.

Some globular clusters, like Omega Centauri in the Milky Way and Mayall II in the Andromeda Galaxy, are extraordinarily massive, measuring several million solar masses (M_{☉}) and having multiple stellar populations. Both are evidence that supermassive globular clusters formed from the cores of dwarf galaxies that have been consumed by larger galaxies. About a quarter of the globular cluster population in the Milky Way may have been accreted this way, as with more than 60% of the globular clusters in the outer halo of Andromeda.

=== Heavy element content ===
Globular clusters normally consist of Population II stars which, compared with Population I stars such as the Sun, have a higher proportion of hydrogen and helium and a lower proportion of heavier elements. Astronomers refer to these heavier elements as metals (distinct from the material concept) and to the proportions of these elements as the metallicity. Produced by stellar nucleosynthesis, the metals are recycled into the interstellar medium and enter a new generation of stars. The proportion of metals can thus be an indication of the age of a star in simple models, with older stars typically having a lower metallicity.

The Dutch astronomer Pieter Oosterhoff observed two special populations of globular clusters, which became known as Oosterhoff groups. The second group has a slightly longer period of RR Lyrae variable stars. While both groups have a low proportion of metallic elements as measured by spectroscopy, the metal spectral lines in the stars of Oosterhoff type I (Oo I) cluster are not quite as weak as those in type II (Oo II), and so type I stars are referred to as metal-rich (e.g. Terzan 7), while type II stars are metal-poor (e.g. ESO 280-SC06). These two distinct populations have been observed in many galaxies, especially massive elliptical galaxies. Both groups are nearly as old as the universe itself and are of similar ages. Suggested scenarios to explain these subpopulations include violent gas-rich galaxy mergers, the accretion of dwarf galaxies, and multiple phases of star formation in a single galaxy. In the Milky Way, the metal-poor clusters are associated with the halo and the metal-rich clusters with the bulge.

A large majority of the metal-poor clusters in the Milky Way are aligned on a plane in the outer part of the galaxy's halo. This observation supports the view that type II clusters were captured from a satellite galaxy, rather than being the oldest members of the Milky Way's globular cluster system as was previously thought. The difference between the two cluster types would then be explained by a time delay between when the two galaxies formed their cluster systems.

=== Exotic components ===
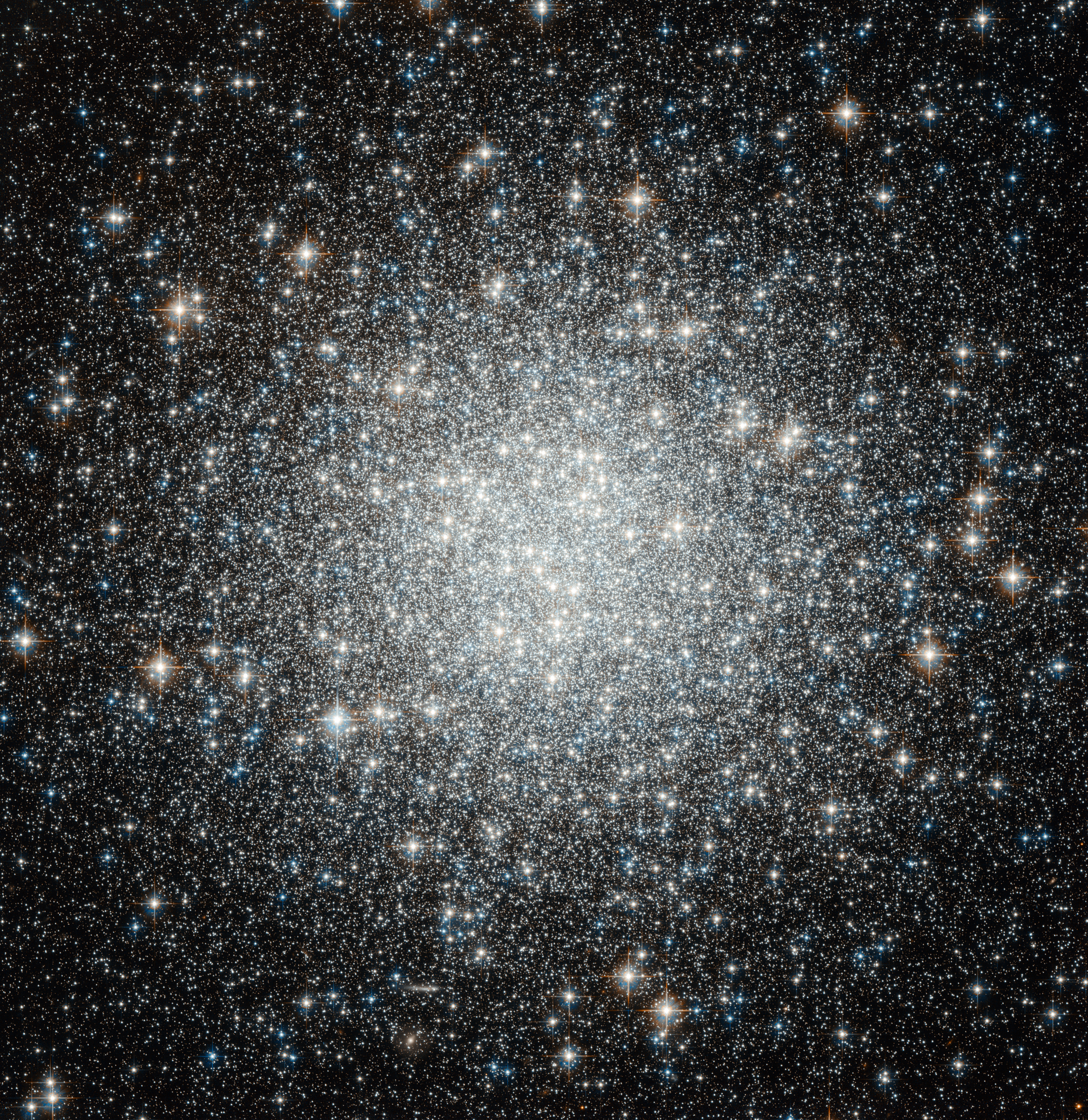
Messier 53 contains an unusually large number of a type of star called blue stragglers.

Close interactions and near-collisions of stars occur relatively often in globular clusters because of their high star density. These chance encounters give rise to some exotic classes of stars – such as blue stragglers, millisecond pulsars, and low-mass X-ray binaries – which are much more common in globular clusters. How blue stragglers form remains unclear, but most models attribute them to interactions between stars, such as stellar mergers, the transfer of material from one star to another, or even an encounter between two binary systems. The resulting star has a higher temperature than other stars in the cluster with comparable luminosity and thus differs from the main-sequence stars formed early in the cluster's existence. Some clusters have two distinct sequences of blue stragglers, one bluer than the other.

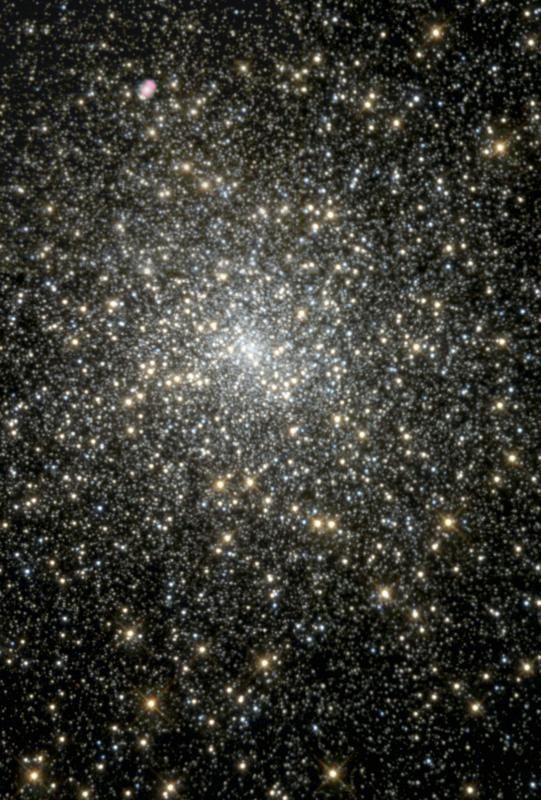
Globular cluster M15 may have an intermediate-mass black hole at its core, but this claim is contested.

Simulation of stellar motions in Messier 4, where astronomers suspect that an intermediate-mass black hole could be present. If confirmed, the black hole would be in the center of the cluster, and would have a sphere of influence (black hole) limited by the red circle.

Astronomers have searched for black holes within globular clusters since the 1970s. The required resolution for this task is exacting; it is only with the Hubble Space Telescope (HST) that the first claimed discoveries were made, in 2002 and 2003. Based on HST observations, other researchers suggested the existence of a 4,000 M_{☉}(solar masses) intermediate-mass black hole in the globular cluster M15 and a 20,000 M_{☉} black hole in the Mayall II cluster of the Andromeda Galaxy. Both X-ray and radio emissions from Mayall II appear consistent with an intermediate-mass black hole; however, these claimed detections are controversial.

The heaviest objects in globular clusters are expected to migrate to the cluster center due to mass segregation. One research group pointed out that the mass-to-light ratio should rise sharply towards the center of the cluster, even without a black hole, in both M15 and Mayall II. Observations from 2018 find no evidence for an intermediate-mass black hole in any globular cluster, including M15, but cannot definitively rule out one with a mass of 500–1000 M_{☉}. Finally, in 2023, an analysis of HST and the Gaia spacecraft data from the closest globular cluster, Messier 4, revealed an excess mass of roughly 800 M_{☉} in the center of this cluster, which appears to not be extended. This could thus be considered as kinematic evidence for an intermediate-mass black hole (even if an unusually compact cluster of compact objects like white dwarfs, neutron stars or stellar-mass black holes cannot be completely discounted).

The confirmation of intermediate-mass black holes in globular clusters would have important ramifications for theories of galaxy development as being possible sources for the supermassive black holes at their centers. The mass of these supposed intermediate-mass black holes is proportional to the mass of their surrounding clusters, following a pattern previously discovered between supermassive black holes and their surrounding galaxies.

== Hertzsprung–Russell diagrams ==
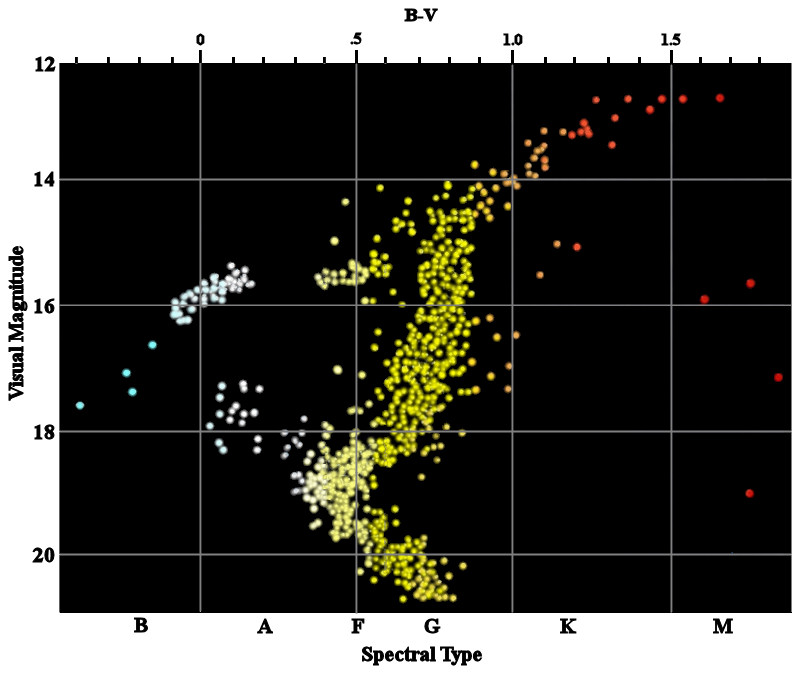
H–R diagram for the globular cluster M3. There is a characteristic "knee" in the curve at magnitude 19 where stars begin entering the giant stage of their evolutionary path, the main-sequence turnoff.

Hertzsprung–Russell diagrams (H–R diagrams) of globular clusters allow astronomers to determine many of the properties of their populations of stars. A H–R diagram is a graph of a large sample of stars plotting their absolute magnitude (their luminosity, or brightness measured from a standard distance), as a function of their color index. The color index, roughly speaking, measures the color of the star; positive color indices indicate a reddish star with a cool surface temperature, while negative values indicate a bluer star with a hotter surface. Stars on a H–R diagram mostly lie along a roughly diagonal line sloping from hot, luminous stars in the upper left to cool, faint stars in the lower right. This line is known as the main sequence and represents the primary stage of stellar evolution. The diagram also includes stars in later evolutionary stages such as the cool but luminous red giants.

Constructing a H–R diagram requires knowing the distance to the observed stars to convert apparent into absolute magnitude. Because all the stars in a globular cluster have about the same distance from Earth, a color–magnitude diagram using their observed magnitudes looks like a shifted H–R diagram (because of the roughly constant difference between their apparent and absolute magnitudes). This shift is called the distance modulus and can be used to calculate the distance to the cluster. The modulus is determined by comparing features (like the main sequence) of the cluster's color–magnitude diagram to corresponding features in a H–R diagram of another set of stars, a method known as spectroscopic parallax or main-sequence fitting.

=== Properties ===
Since globular clusters form at once from a single giant molecular cloud, a cluster's stars have roughly the same age and composition. A star's evolution is primarily determined by its initial mass, so the positions of stars in a cluster's H–R or color–magnitude diagram mostly reflect their initial masses. A cluster's H–R diagram, therefore, appears quite different from H–R diagrams containing stars of a wide variety of ages. Almost all stars fall on a well-defined curve in globular cluster H–R diagrams, and that curve's shape indicates the age of the cluster. A more detailed H–R diagram often reveals multiple stellar populations as indicated by the presence of closely separated curves, each corresponding to a distinct population of stars with a slightly different age or composition. Observations with the Wide Field Camera 3, installed in 2009 on the Hubble Space Telescope, made it possible to distinguish these slightly different curves.

The most massive main-sequence stars have the highest luminosity and will be the first to evolve into the giant star stage. As the cluster ages, stars of successively lower masses will do the same. Therefore, the age of a single-population cluster can be measured by looking for those stars just beginning to enter the giant star stage, which form a "knee" in the H–R diagram called the main-sequence turnoff, bending to the upper right from the main-sequence line. The absolute magnitude at this bend is directly a function of the cluster's age; an age scale can be plotted on an axis parallel to the magnitude.

The morphology and luminosity of globular cluster stars in H–R diagrams are influenced by numerous parameters, many of which are still actively researched. Recent observations have overturned the historical paradigm that all globular clusters consist of stars born at exactly the same time, or sharing exactly the same chemical abundance. Some clusters feature multiple populations, slightly differing in composition and age; for example, high-precision imagery of cluster NGC 2808 discerned three close, but distinct, main sequences. Further, the placements of the cluster stars in a H–R diagram (including the brightnesses of distance indicators) can be influenced by observational biases. One such effect, called blending, arises when the cores of globular clusters are so dense that observations see multiple stars as a single target. The brightness measured for that seemingly single star is thus incorrect – too bright, given that multiple stars contributed. In turn, the computed distance is incorrect, so the blending effect can introduce a systematic uncertainty into the cosmic distance ladder and may bias the estimated age of the universe and the Hubble constant.

=== Consequences ===
The blue stragglers appear on the H–R diagram as a series diverging from the main sequence in the direction of brighter, bluer stars. White dwarfs (the final remnants of some Sun-like stars), which are much fainter and somewhat hotter than the main-sequence stars, lie on the bottom-left of a H–R diagram. Globular clusters can be dated by looking at the temperatures of the coolest white dwarfs, often giving results as old as 12.7 billion years. In comparison, open clusters are rarely older than about half a billion years. The ages of globular clusters place a lower bound on the age of the entire universe, presenting a significant constraint in cosmology. Astronomers were historically faced with age estimates of clusters older than their cosmological models would allow, but better measurements of cosmological parameters, through deep sky surveys and satellites, appear to have resolved this issue.

Studying globular clusters sheds light on how the composition of the formational gas and dust affects stellar evolution; the stars' evolutionary tracks vary depending on the abundance of heavy elements. Data obtained from these studies are then used to study the evolution of the Milky Way as a whole.

== Morphology ==
Ellipticity of globular clusters
Galaxy	Ellipticity
Milky Way	0.07±0.04
LMC	0.16±0.05
SMC	0.19±0.06
M31	0.09±0.04

In contrast to open clusters, most globular clusters remain gravitationally bound together for time periods comparable to the lifespans of most of their stars. Strong tidal interactions with other large masses result in the dispersal of some stars, leaving behind "tidal tails" of stars removed from the cluster.

After formation, the stars in the globular cluster begin to interact gravitationally with each other. The velocities of the stars steadily change, and the stars lose any history of their original velocity. The characteristic interval for this to occur is the relaxation time, related to the characteristic length of time a star needs to cross the cluster and the number of stellar masses. The relaxation time varies by cluster, but a typical value is on the order of one billion years.

Although globular clusters are generally spherical in form, ellipticity can form via tidal interactions. Clusters within the Milky Way and the Andromeda Galaxy are typically oblate spheroids in shape, while those in the Large Magellanic Cloud are more elliptical.

=== Radii ===
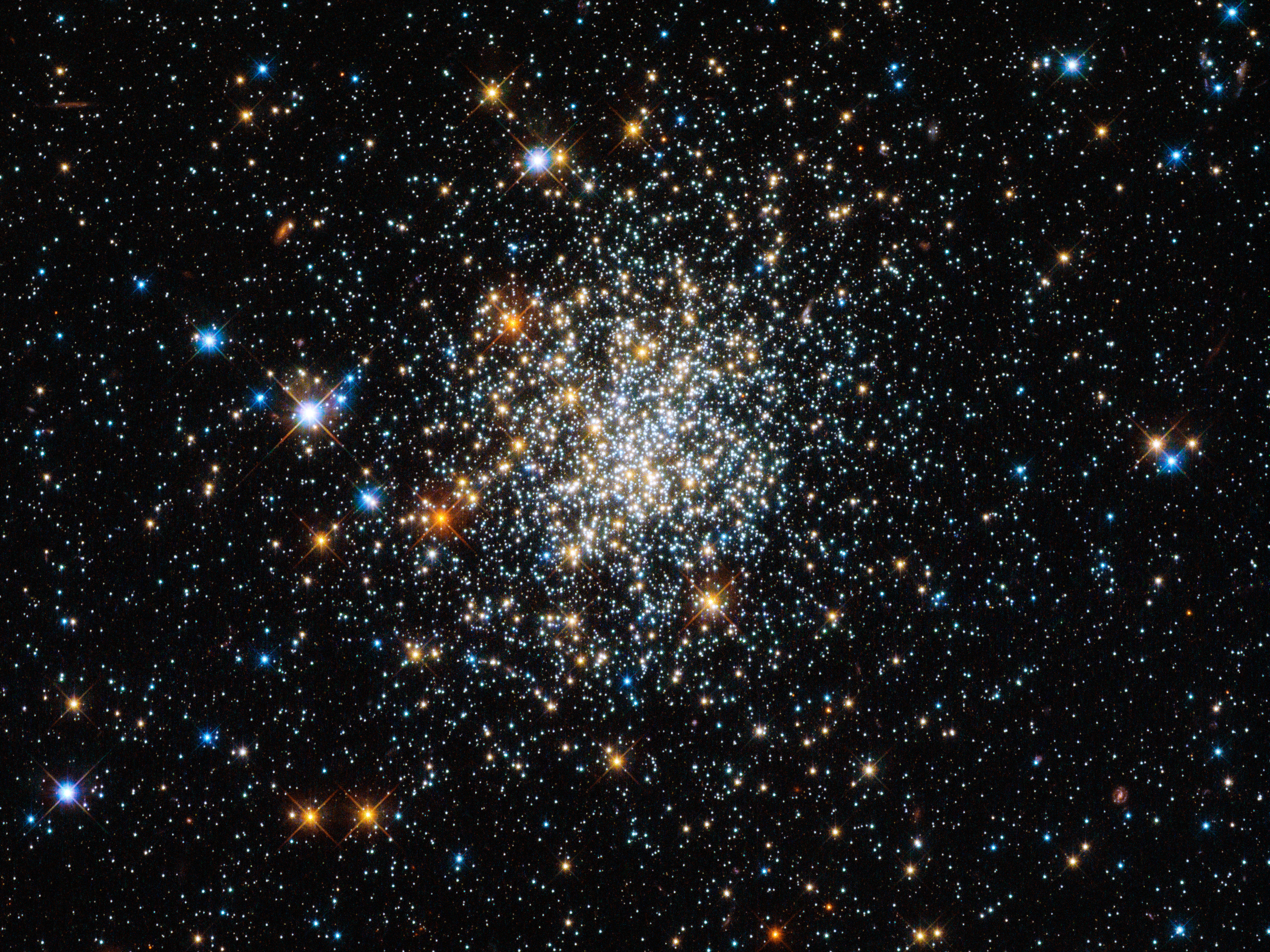
NGC 411 is classified as an open cluster.

Astronomers characterize the morphology (shape) of a globular cluster by means of standard radii: the core radius (r_{c}), the half-light radius (r_{h}), and the tidal or Jacobi radius (r_{t}). The radius can be expressed as a physical distance or as a subtended angle in the sky. Considering a radius around the core, the surface luminosity of the cluster steadily decreases with distance, and the core radius is the distance at which the apparent surface luminosity has dropped by half. A comparable quantity is the half-light radius, or the distance from the core containing half the total luminosity of the cluster; the half-light radius is typically larger than the core radius.

Most globular clusters have a half-light radius of less than ten parsecs (pc), although some globular clusters have very large radii, like NGC 2419 (r_{h} = 18 pc) and Palomar 14 (r_{h} = 25 pc). The half-light radius includes stars in the outer part of the cluster that happen to lie along the line of sight, so theorists also use the half-mass radius (r_{m}) – the radius from the core that contains half the total mass of the cluster. A small half-mass radius, relative to the overall size, indicates a dense core. Messier 3 (M3), for example, has an overall visible dimension of about 18 arc minutes, but a half-mass radius of only 1.12 arc minutes.

The tidal radius, or Hill sphere, is the distance from the center of the globular cluster at which the external gravitation of the galaxy has more influence over the stars in the cluster than does the cluster itself. This is the distance at which the individual stars belonging to a cluster can unbound by the galaxy. The tidal radius of M3, for example, is about forty arc minutes, or about 113 pc.

=== Mass segregation, luminosity and core collapse ===
In most Milky Way clusters, the surface brightness of a globular cluster as a function of decreasing distance to the core first increases, then levels off at a distance typically 1–2 parsecs from the core. About 20% of the globular clusters have undergone a process termed "core collapse". The luminosity in such a cluster increases steadily all the way to the core region.

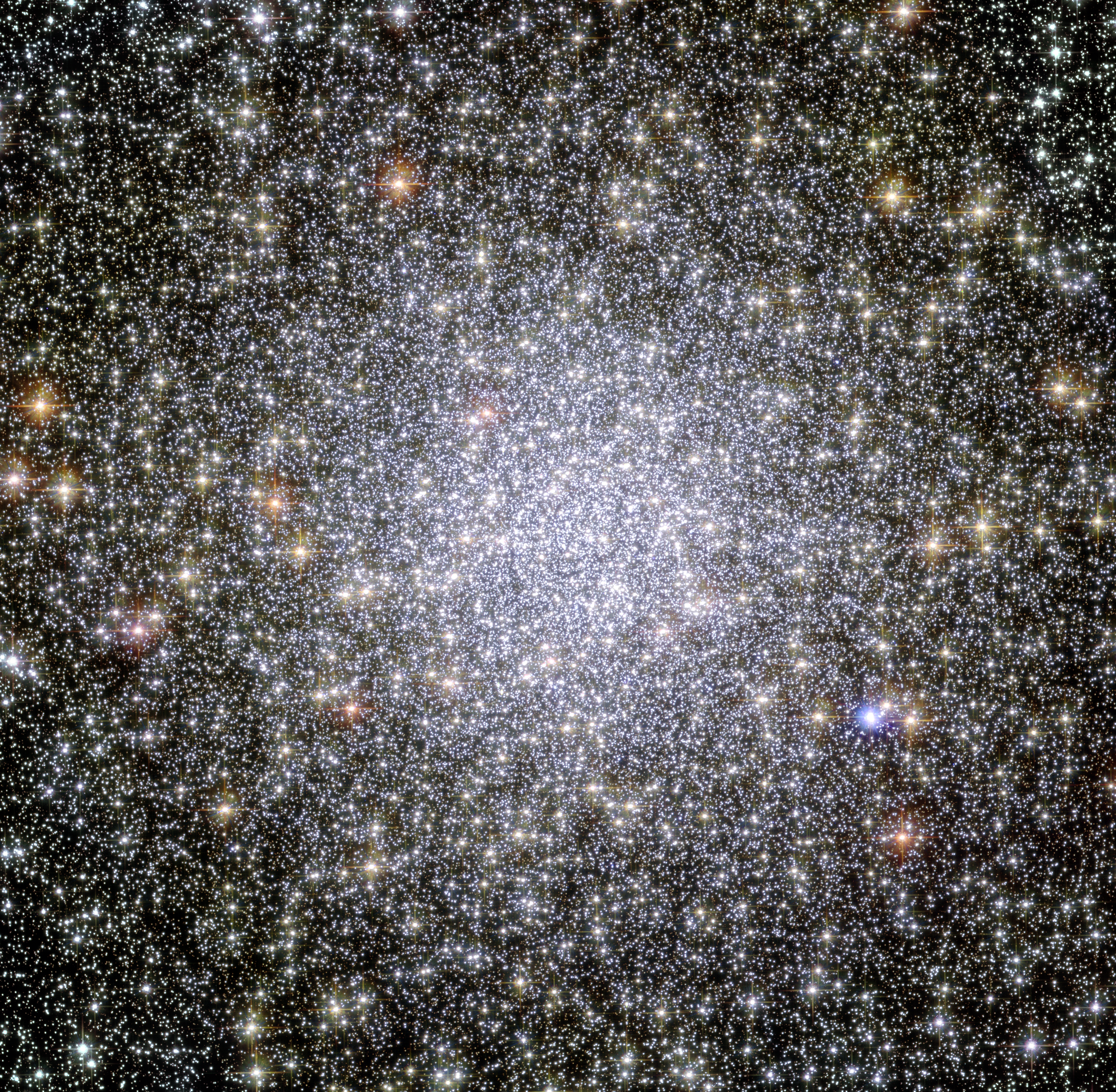
47 Tucanae is the second most luminous globular cluster in the Milky Way, after Omega Centauri.

Models of globular clusters predict that core collapse occurs when the more massive stars in a globular cluster encounter their less massive counterparts. Over time, dynamic processes cause individual stars to migrate from the center of the cluster to the outside, resulting in a net loss of kinetic energy from the core region and leading the region's remaining stars to occupy a more compact volume. When this gravothermal instability occurs, the central region of the cluster becomes densely crowded with stars, and the surface brightness of the cluster forms a power-law cusp. A massive black hole at the core could also result in a luminosity cusp. Over a long time, this leads to a concentration of massive stars near the core, a phenomenon called mass segregation.

The dynamical heating effect of binary star systems works to prevent an initial core collapse of the cluster. When a star passes near a binary system, the orbit of the latter pair tends to contract, releasing energy. Only after this primordial supply of energy is exhausted can a deeper core collapse proceed. In contrast, the effect of tidal shocks as a globular cluster repeatedly passes through the plane of a spiral galaxy tends to significantly accelerate core collapse.

Core collapse may be divided into three phases. During a cluster's adolescence, core collapse begins with stars nearest the core. Interactions between binary star systems prevents further collapse as the cluster approaches middle age. The central binaries are either disrupted or ejected, resulting in a tighter concentration at the core. The interaction of stars in the collapsed core region causes tight binary systems to form. As other stars interact with these tight binaries they increase the energy at the core, causing the cluster to re-expand. As the average time for a core collapse is typically less than the age of the galaxy, many of a galaxy's globular clusters may have passed through a core collapse stage, then re-expanded.

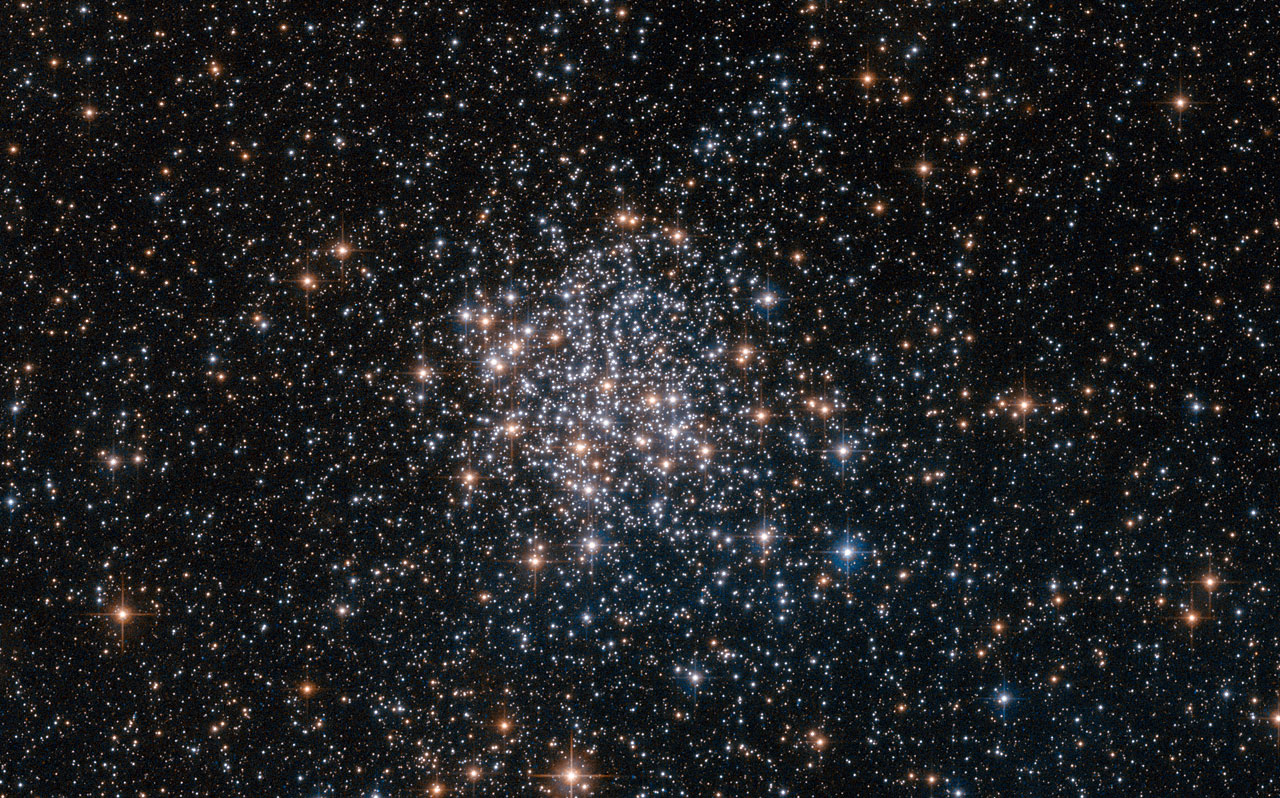
Globular cluster NGC 1854 is located in the Large Magellanic Cloud.

The HST has provided convincing observational evidence of this stellar mass-sorting process in globular clusters. Heavier stars slow down and crowd at the cluster's core, while lighter stars pick up speed and tend to spend more time at the cluster's periphery. The cluster 47 Tucanae, made up of about one million stars, is one of the densest globular clusters in the Southern Hemisphere. This cluster was subjected to an intensive photographic survey that obtained precise velocities for nearly fifteen thousand stars in this cluster.

The overall luminosities of the globular clusters within the Milky Way and the Andromeda Galaxy each have a roughly Gaussian distribution, with an average magnitude M_{v} and a variance σ^{2}. This distribution of globular cluster luminosities is called the Globular Cluster Luminosity Function (GCLF). For the Milky Way, M_{v} = −7.29 ± 0.13, σ = 1.1 ± 0.1. The GCLF has been used as a "standard candle" for measuring the distance to other galaxies, under the assumption that globular clusters in remote galaxies behave similarly to those in the Milky Way.

=== N-body simulations ===
Computing the gravitational interactions between stars within a globular cluster requires solving the N-body problem. The naive computational cost for a dynamic simulation increases in proportion to N^{2} (where N is the number of objects), so the computing requirements to accurately simulate a cluster of thousands of stars can be enormous. A more efficient method of simulating the N-body dynamics of a globular cluster is done by subdivision into small volumes and velocity ranges, and using probabilities to describe the locations of the stars. Their motions are described by means of the Fokker–Planck equation, often using a model describing the mass density as a function of radius, such as a Plummer model. The simulation becomes more difficult when the effects of binaries and the interaction with external gravitation forces (such as from the Milky Way galaxy) must also be included. In 2010 a low-density globular cluster's lifetime evolution was able to be directly computed, star-by-star.

Completed N-body simulations have shown that stars can follow unusual paths through the cluster, often forming loops and falling more directly toward the core than would a single star orbiting a central mass. Additionally, some stars gain sufficient energy to escape the cluster due to gravitational interactions that result in a sufficient increase in velocity. Over long periods of time this process leads to the dissipation of the cluster, a process termed evaporation. The typical time scale for the evaporation of a globular cluster is 10^{10} years. The ultimate fate of a globular cluster must be either to accrete stars at its core, causing its steady contraction, or gradual shedding of stars from its outer layers.

Binary stars form a significant portion of stellar systems, with up to half of all field stars and open cluster stars occurring in binary systems. The present-day binary fraction in globular clusters is difficult to measure, and any information about their initial binary fraction is lost by subsequent dynamical evolution. Numerical simulations of globular clusters have demonstrated that binaries can hinder and even reverse the process of core collapse in globular clusters. When a star in a cluster has a gravitational encounter with a binary system, a possible result is that the binary becomes more tightly bound and kinetic energy is added to the solitary star. When the massive stars in the cluster are sped up by this process, it reduces the contraction at the core and limits core collapse.

=== Intermediate forms ===
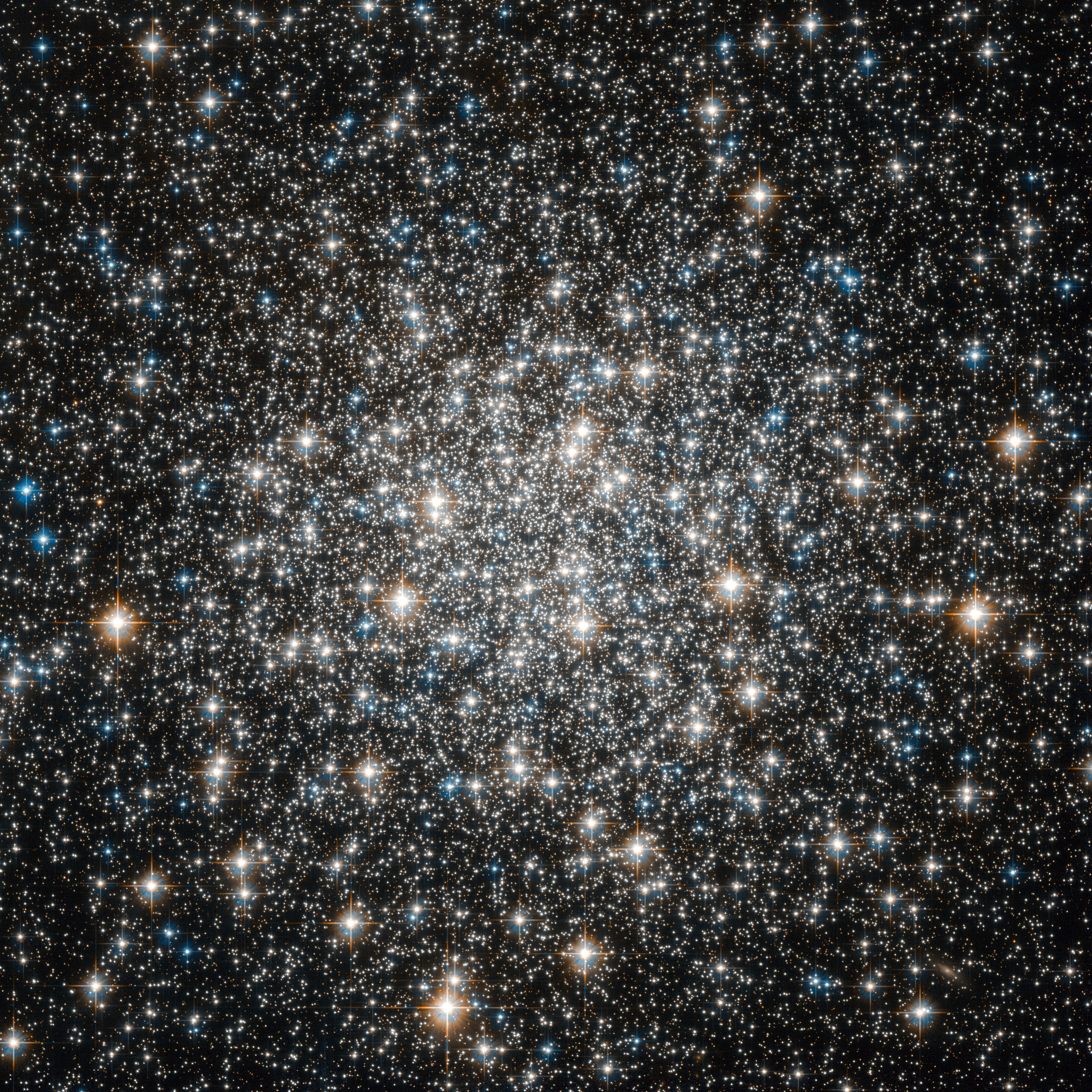
Messier 10 lies about 15,000 light-years from Earth, in the constellation of Ophiuchus.

Cluster classification is not always definitive; objects have been found that can be classified in more than one category. For example, BH 176 in the southern part of the Milky Way has properties of both an open and a globular cluster.

In 2005 astronomers discovered a new, "extended" type of star cluster in the Andromeda Galaxy's halo, similar to the globular cluster. The three new-found clusters have a similar star count to globular clusters and share other characteristics, such as stellar populations and metallicity, but are distinguished by their larger size – several hundred light years across – and some hundred times lower density. Their stars are separated by larger distances; parametrically, these clusters lie somewhere between a globular cluster and a dwarf spheroidal galaxy. The formation of these extended clusters is likely related to accretion. It is unclear why the Milky Way lacks such clusters; Andromeda is unlikely to be the sole galaxy with them, but their presence in other galaxies remains unknown.

== Tidal encounters ==
When a globular cluster comes close to a large mass, such as the core region of a galaxy, it undergoes a tidal interaction. The difference in gravitational strength between the nearer and further parts of the cluster results in an asymmetric tidal force. A "tidal shock" occurs whenever the orbit of a cluster takes it through the plane of a galaxy.

Tidal shocks can pull stars away from the cluster halo, leaving only the core part of the cluster; these trails of stars can extend several degrees away from the cluster. These tails typically both precede and follow the cluster along its orbit and can accumulate significant portions of the original mass of the cluster, forming clump-like features. The globular cluster Palomar 5, for example, is near the apogalactic point of its orbit after passing through the Milky Way. Streams of stars extend outward toward the front and rear of the orbital path of this cluster, stretching to distances of 13,000 light years. Tidal interactions have stripped away much of Palomar 5's mass; further interactions with the galactic core are expected to transform it into a long stream of stars orbiting the Milky Way in its halo.

The Milky Way is in the process of tidally stripping the Sagittarius Dwarf Spheroidal Galaxy of stars and globular clusters through the Sagittarius Stream. As many as 20% of the globular clusters in the Milky Way's outer halo may have originated in that galaxy. Palomar 12, for example, most likely originated in the Sagittarius Dwarf Spheroidal but is now associated with the Milky Way. Tidal interactions like these add kinetic energy into a globular cluster, dramatically increasing the evaporation rate and shrinking the size of the cluster. The increased evaporation accelerates the process of core collapse.

== Planets ==
Astronomers are searching for exoplanets of stars in globular star clusters. A search in 2000 for giant planets in the globular cluster 47 Tucanae came up negative, suggesting that the abundance of heavier elements – low in globular clusters – necessary to build these planets may need to be at least 40% of the Sun's abundance. Because terrestrial planets are built from heavier elements such as silicon, iron and magnesium, member stars have a far lower likelihood of hosting Earth-mass planets than stars in the solar neighborhood. Globular clusters are thus unlikely to host habitable terrestrial planets.

A giant planet, PSR B1620−26 b, was found in the globular cluster Messier 4, orbiting a pulsar in the binary star system PSR B1620-26. The planet's eccentric and highly inclined orbit suggests it may have been formed around another star in the cluster, then "exchanged" into its current arrangement. The likelihood of close encounters between stars in a globular cluster can disrupt planetary systems; some planets break free to become rogue planets, orbiting the galaxy. Planets orbiting close to their star can become disrupted, potentially leading to orbital decay and an increase in orbital eccentricity and tidal effects. In 2024, a gas giant or brown dwarf was found to closely orbit the pulsar "M62H", where the name indicates that the planetary system belongs to the globular cluster Messier 62.

== See also ==
- Extragalactic Distance Scale
- Kraken galaxy
- Leonard-Merritt mass estimator
- List of globular clusters
- Open cluster
- Blueberry galaxy § Little blue dots - Little blue dot galaxies are thought to be the progenitors of globular clusters.
- Polytrope
- Stellar population
