= Dark globular cluster =

Extremely massive collection of stars

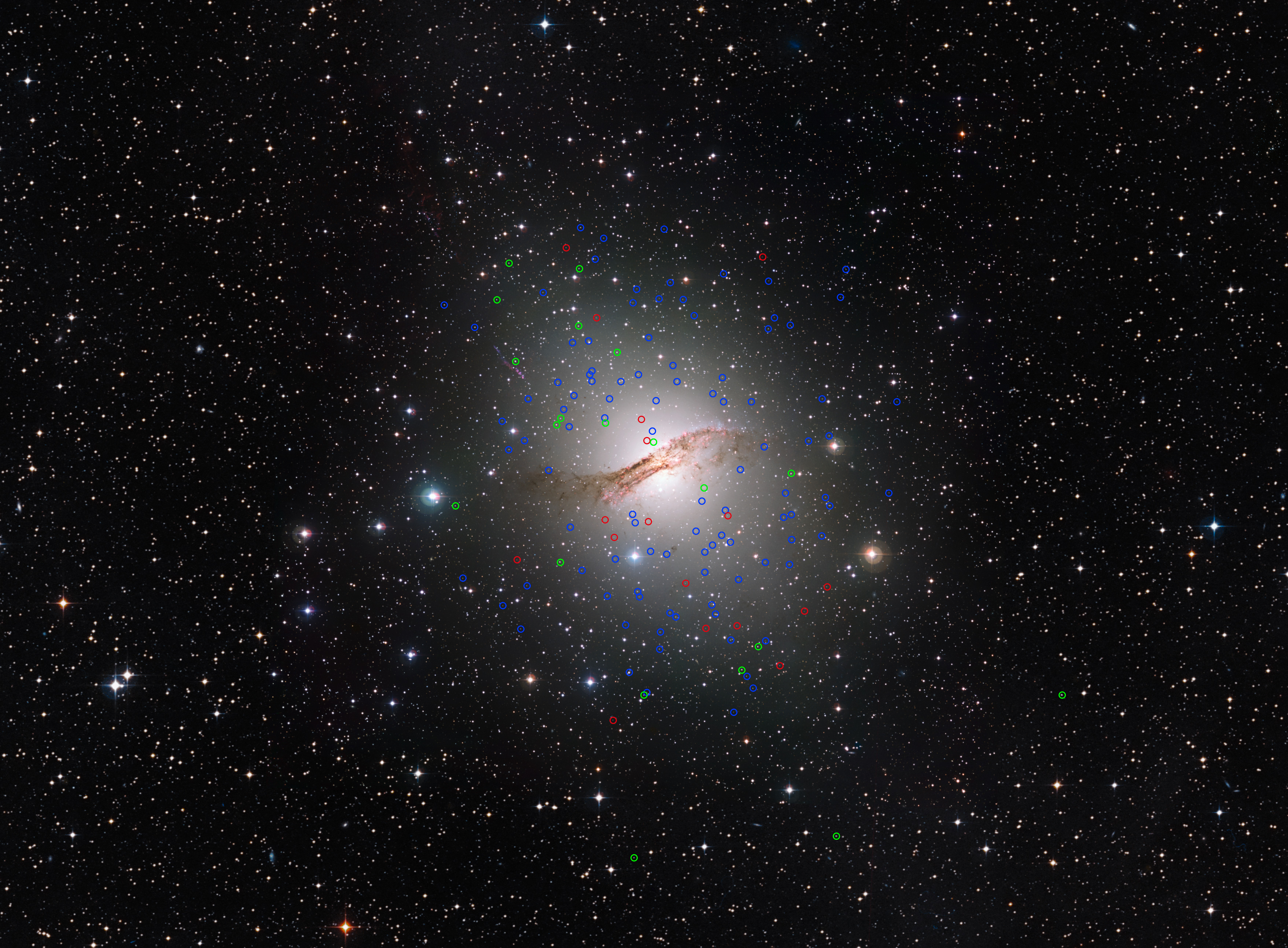
Observations with ESO's Very Large Telescope in Chile have discovered a new class of “dark” globular star clusters around this galaxy. In the image, the dark globulars are circled in red. Normal globulars are circled in blue, and globulars showing similar properties to dwarf galaxies are in green.

Dark globular cluster is a proposed type of globular star clusters that has an unusually high mass for the number of stars within it. Proposed in 2015 on the basis of observational data, dark globular clusters are believed to be populated by objects with significant dark matter components, such as central massive black holes.

== Observational data ==
The observational data for dark globular clusters comes from the Very Large Telescope (VLT) in Chile which observed the vicinity of the galaxy Centaurus A. Many of the globular clusters inside that galaxy are brighter and more massive than those orbiting the Milky Way and a sample of 125 globular clusters around Centaurus A was studied using the VLT's FLAMES instrument. While globular clusters are normally considered to be almost devoid of dark matter, the study of the dynamical properties of sampled clusters suggested the presence of exotically concentrated dark matter. The existence of dark globular clusters would suggest that their formation and evolution are markedly different from other globular clusters in Centaurus A and the Local Group.

== See also ==
- Extragalactic Distance Scale
- Leonard-Merritt mass estimator
- Polytrope
