= ESO 280-SC06 =

Globular star cluster in the constellation Ara

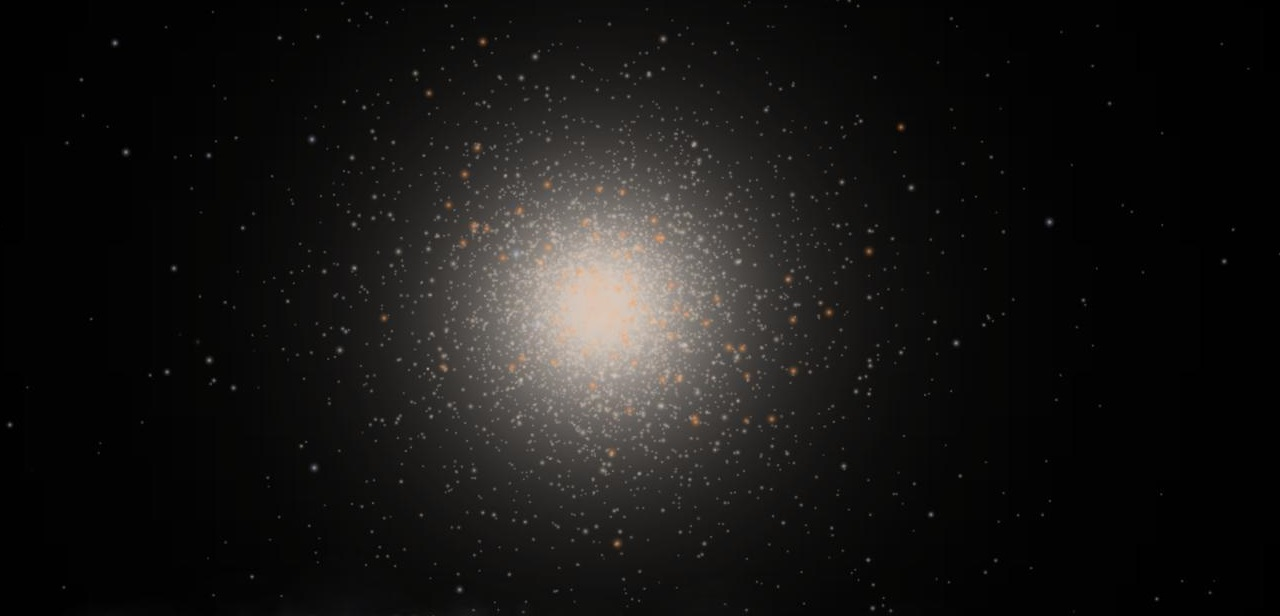
- The globular cluster ESO 280-SC06, rendered in Celestia

Observation data (J2000 epoch)
- Constellation: Ara
- Right ascension: 18^{h} 09^{m} 06.0^{s}
- Declination: −46° 25′ 23″
- Distance: 69.8 kly (21.4 kpc)
- Apparent magnitude (V): 12.00

Physical characteristics
- Absolute magnitude: -4.87
- Metallicity: [Fe/H] = –1.8 dex
- Other designations: ESO 280-6

ESO 280-SC06 (also known as ESO 280-6) is a globular cluster 69,800 light years from the Sun in the constellation of Ara. The cluster received this designation when it was catalogued by the European Southern Observatory (ESO) in Chile. Imagery and Hertzsprung-Russell diagrams show a sparsely populated globular cluster with a compact core.
