= Messier 53 =

Globular cluster in the constellation Coma Berenices

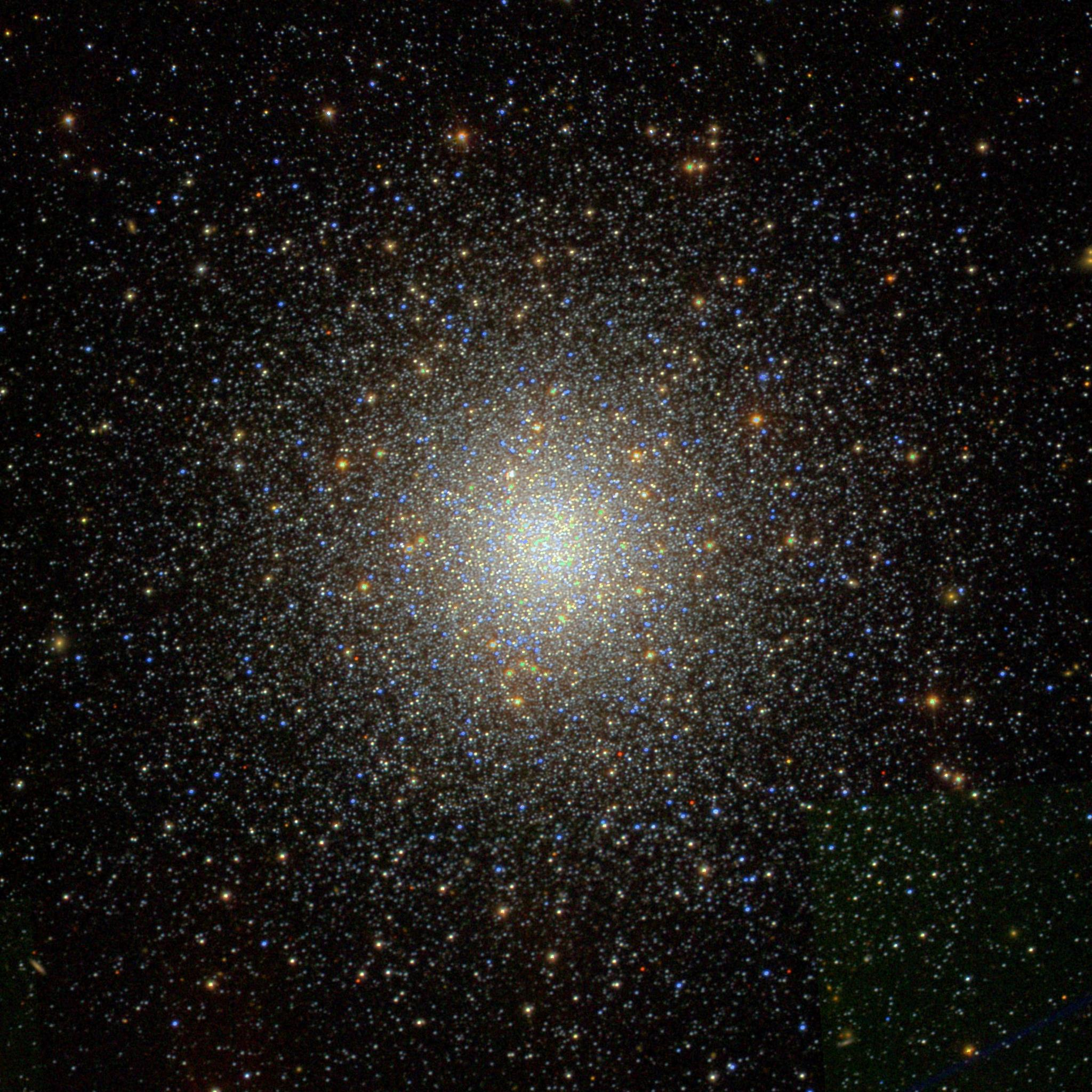
- Globular cluster Messier 53 in Coma Berenices

Observation data (J2000 epoch)
- Class: V
- Constellation: Coma Berenices
- Right ascension: 13^{h} 12^{m} 55.25^{s}
- Declination: +18° 10′ 05.4″
- Distance: 5.8×10^{4} ly (18 kpc)
- Apparent magnitude (V): 7.6
- Apparent dimensions (V): 13.0′

Physical characteristics
- Mass: 8.26×10^{5} M_{☉}
- Metallicity: [Fe/H] = –1.86 dex
- Estimated age: 12.67 Gyr
- Other designations: M53, NGC 5024, GCl 22, C 1310+184

Messier 53 (also known as M53 or NGC 5024) is a globular cluster in the constellation Coma Berenices. It was discovered by Johann Elert Bode in 1775. M53 is about 60,000 light-years (18.4 kpc) light-years away from the Galactic Center, and almost the same distance (about 58,000 light-years (17.9 kpc)) from the Solar System. The cluster has a diameter of about 12 parsecs.

M53 is a metal-poor cluster and at one time was thought to be the most metal-poor cluster in the Milky Way. Most of the red giant branch in the cluster are first-generation stars. That is, they did not form from gas recycled from previous generations of stars in the cluster. This differs from the majority of globular clusters that are more dominated by second generation stars. The second generation stars in NGC 5024 tend to be more concentrated in the core region. Overall, the stellar composition of cluster members is similar to members of the Milky Way halo.

The cluster displays tidal features including clumps and ripples, and tails along its orbit in an east–west direction. A tidal bridge-like structure appears to connect M53 with the globular cluster NGC 5053, and an envelope surrounding both clusters. These may indicate that a dynamic tidal interaction has occurred between the two clusters, a situation that may be unique within the Milky Way. In addition, M53 is a candidate member of the Sagittarius dwarf galaxy tidal stream.

Among the variable star population in the cluster, there are 55 RR Lyrae variables. There are also at least three variables of type SX Phe and a semi-regular red giant.

== See also ==
- List of Messier objects
