= Messier 22 =

Elliptical globular cluster in the constellation Sagittarius

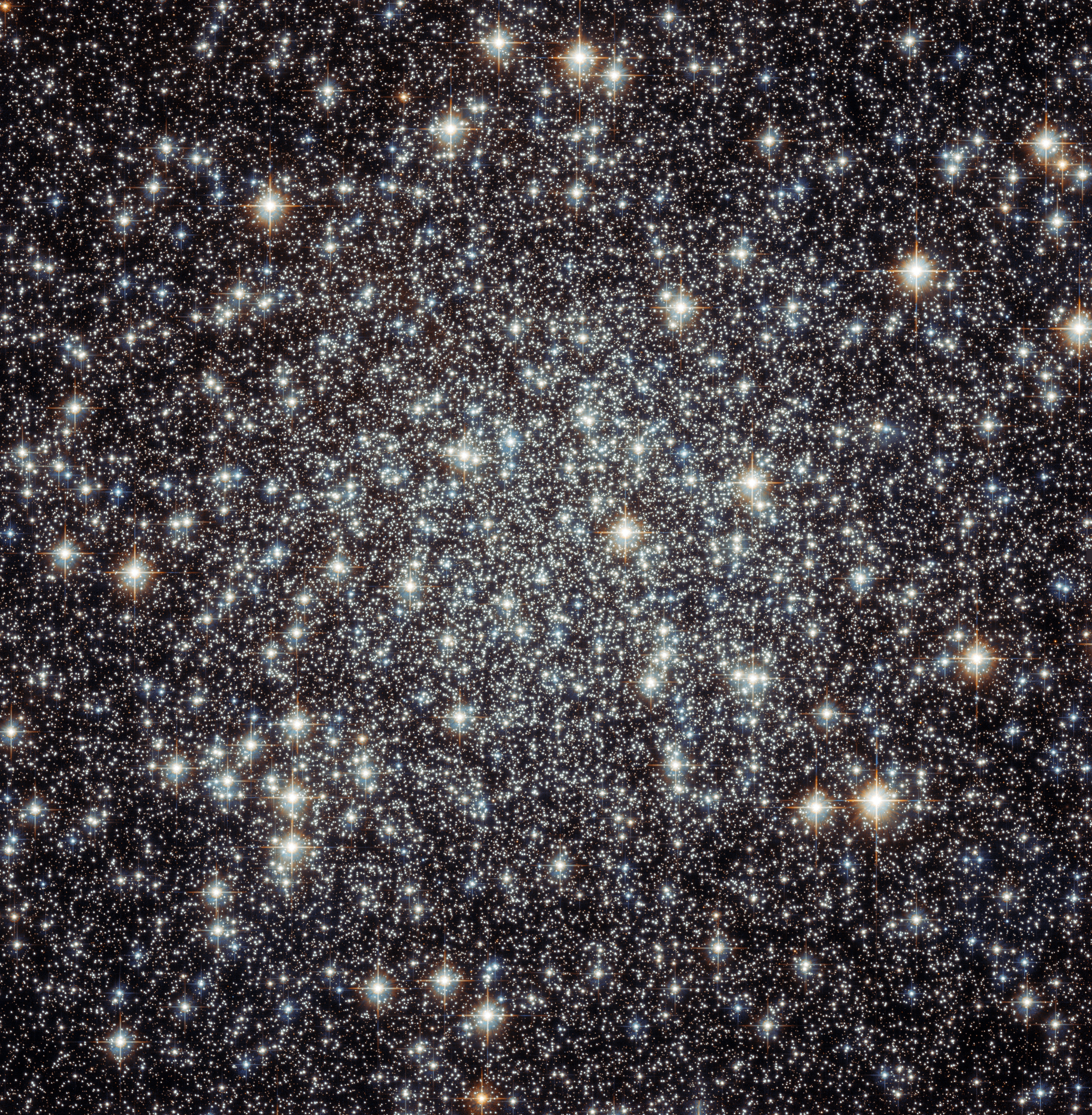
- Core of Messier 22

Observation data (J2000 epoch)
- Class: VII
- Constellation: Sagittarius
- Right ascension: 18^{h} 36^{m} 23.94^{s}
- Declination: –23° 54′ 17.1″
- Distance: 10.6 ± 1.0 kly (3 ± 0.3 kpc)
- Apparent magnitude (V): 5.1
- Apparent dimensions (V): 32 arcmins

Physical characteristics
- Mass: 2.9×10^{5} M_{☉}
- Radius: 50 ± 5 ly
- V_{HB}: 14.2
- Metallicity: [Fe/H] = –1.49 dex
- Estimated age: 12 Gyr
- Notable features: One of four globulars known to contain a planetary nebula.
- Other designations: NGC 6656, GCl 99

Messier 22 or M22, also known as NGC 6656 or the Great Sagittarius Cluster, or less commonly the Crackerjack Cluster, is an elliptical globular cluster of stars in the constellation Sagittarius, near the Galactic bulge region. It is one of the brightest globulars visible in the night sky. The brightest stars are 11th magnitude, with hundreds of stars bright enough to resolve with an 8" telescope. It is just south of the sun's position in mid-December, and northeast of Lambda Sagittarii (Kaus Borealis), the northernmost star of the "Teapot" asterism.

M22 was one of the first globulars to be discovered, in 1665 (Note: on August 26) by Abraham Ihle and it was included in Charles Messier's catalog of comet-like objects in 1764. (Note: on June 5) It was one of the first globular clusters to be carefully studied – first by Harlow Shapley in 1930. He placed within it roughly 70,000 stars and found it had a dense core. Then Halton Arp and William G. Melbourne continued studies in 1959. Due to the large color spread of its red giant branch (RGB) sequence, akin to that in Omega Centauri, it became the object of intense scrutiny starting in 1977 with James E. Hesser et al.

M22 is one of the nearer globular clusters to Earth – at about 10,600 light-years away. It spans 32′ on the sky which means its diameter (width across) is 99 ± 9 light-years, given its estimated distance. 32 variable stars have been recorded in M22. It is in front of part of the galactic bulge and is therefore useful for its microlensing effect on those background stars.

Despite its relative proximity to us, this metal-poor cluster's light is limited by dust extinction, giving it an apparent magnitude of 5.5; even so, it is the brightest globular cluster visible from mid-northern latitudes (such as Japan, Korea, Europe and most of North America). From those latitudes due to its declination of nearly 24° south of the (celestial) equator, its daily path is low in the southern sky. It thus appears less impressive to people in the temperate northern hemisphere than counterparts fairly near in angle (best viewed in the Summer night sky) such as M13 and M5.

M22 is one of only four globulars of our galaxy (Note: the others being M15, NGC 6441 and Palomar 6) known to contain a planetary nebula (an expanding, glowing gas swell from a massive star, often a red giant). It was an object first noted of interest using the IRAS satellite by Fred Gillett and his associates in 1986, as a pointlike light source (Note: IRAS 18333-2357) and its nature was found in 1989 by Gillett et al. The planetary nebula's central star is a blue star. The nebula, designated GJJC1, is likely about only 6,000 years old.

Two black holes of between 10 and 20 solar masses (M_{☉}) each were unearthed with the Very Large Array radio telescope in New Mexico and corroborated by the Chandra X-ray telescope in 2012. These imply that gravitational ejection of black holes from clusters is not as efficient as was previously thought, and leads to estimates of a total 5 to 100 black holes within M22. Interactions between stars and black holes could explain the unusually large core of the cluster.

== Gallery ==
location of M22 in Sagittarius

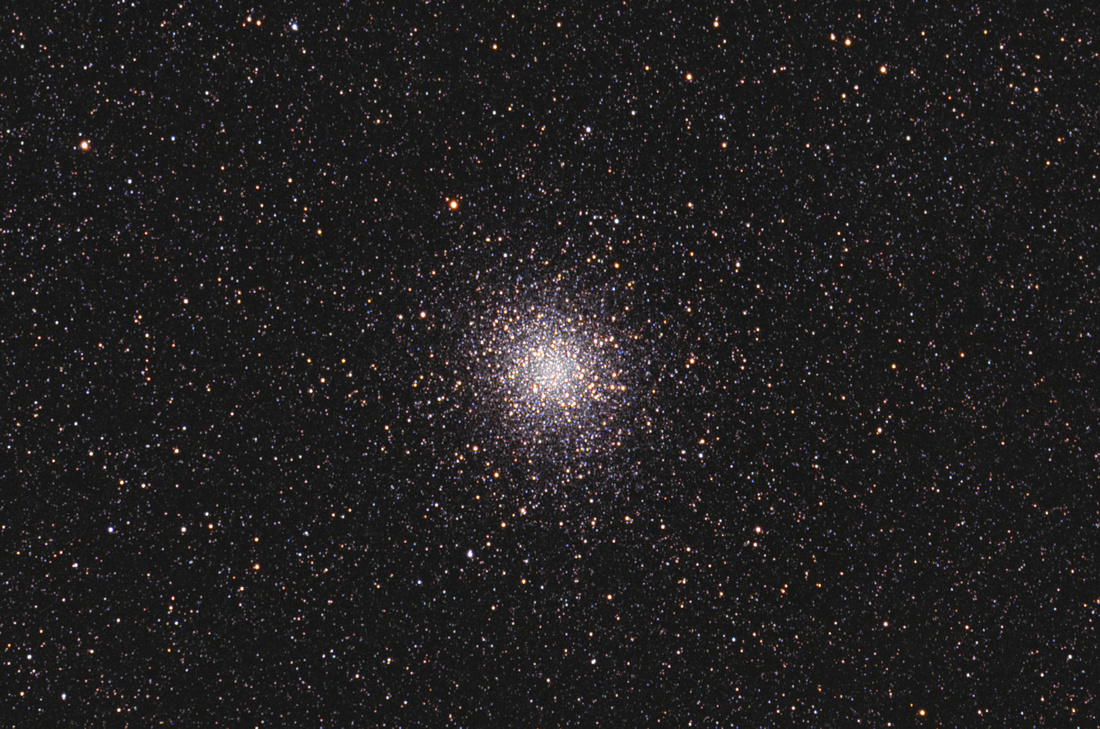
Wide field view of M22

== See also ==
- New General Catalogue
- Messier object
- List of globular clusters
