= Djorgovski 1 =

Globular cluster

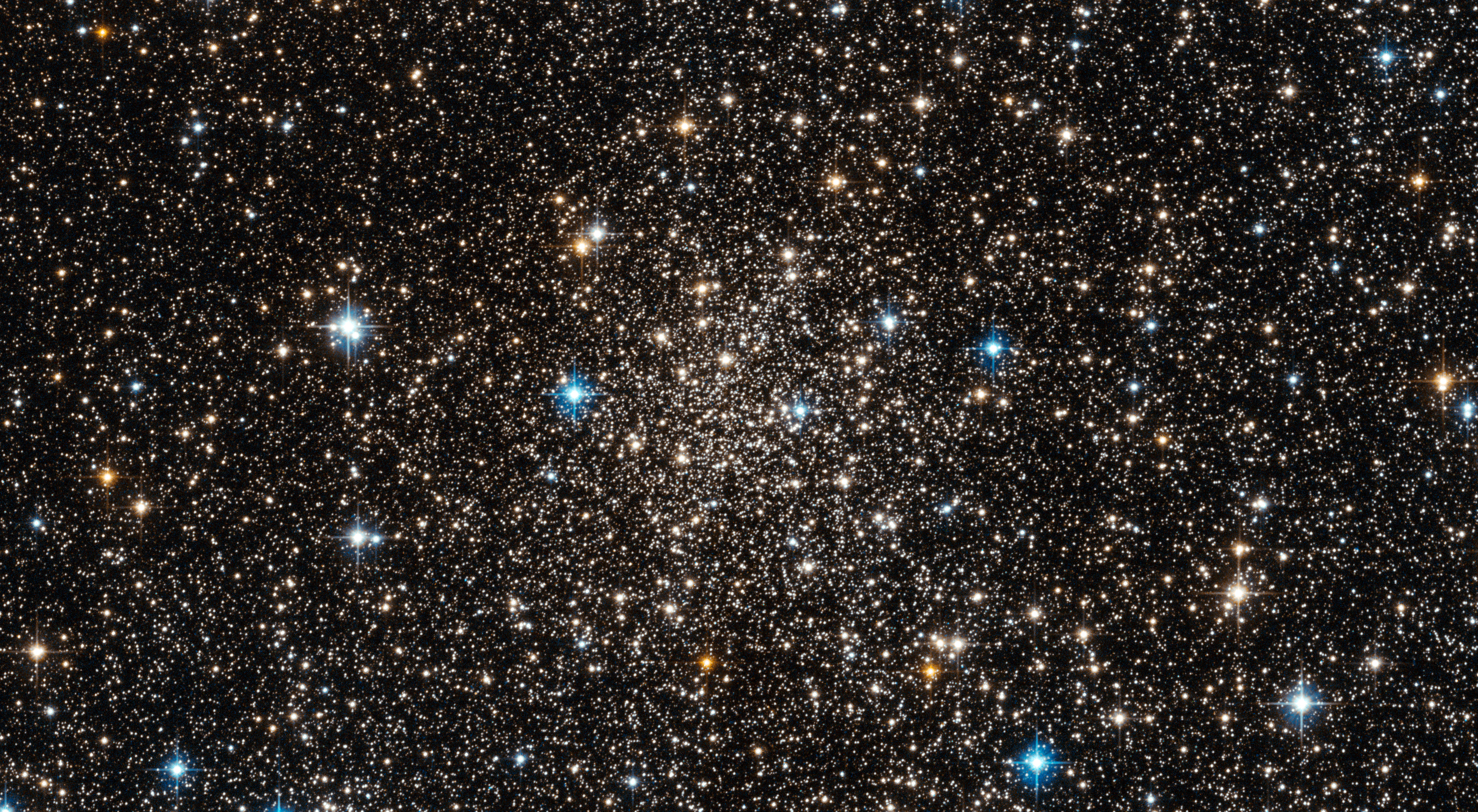

Observation data (J2000 epoch)
- Constellation: Scorpius
- Right ascension: 17^{h} 47^{m} 28.3^{s}
- Declination: −33° 03:56′
- Distance: 44.7 kly
- Apparent magnitude (V): 13.6

Physical characteristics
- Metallicity: [Fe/H] = −1.51 dex
- Other designations: Djorg 1

Djorgovski 1 is a globular cluster discovered in 1986 by George Djorgovski who was looking for possible obscured globular clusters using the IRAS Point Source Catalog. Studies show that its stars are "metal-poor" – they contain hydrogen and helium but little else. Djorgovski 1 is actually one of the most metal-poor clusters in the inner galaxy.
