= NGC 411 =

Globular cluster located in the constellation Tucana

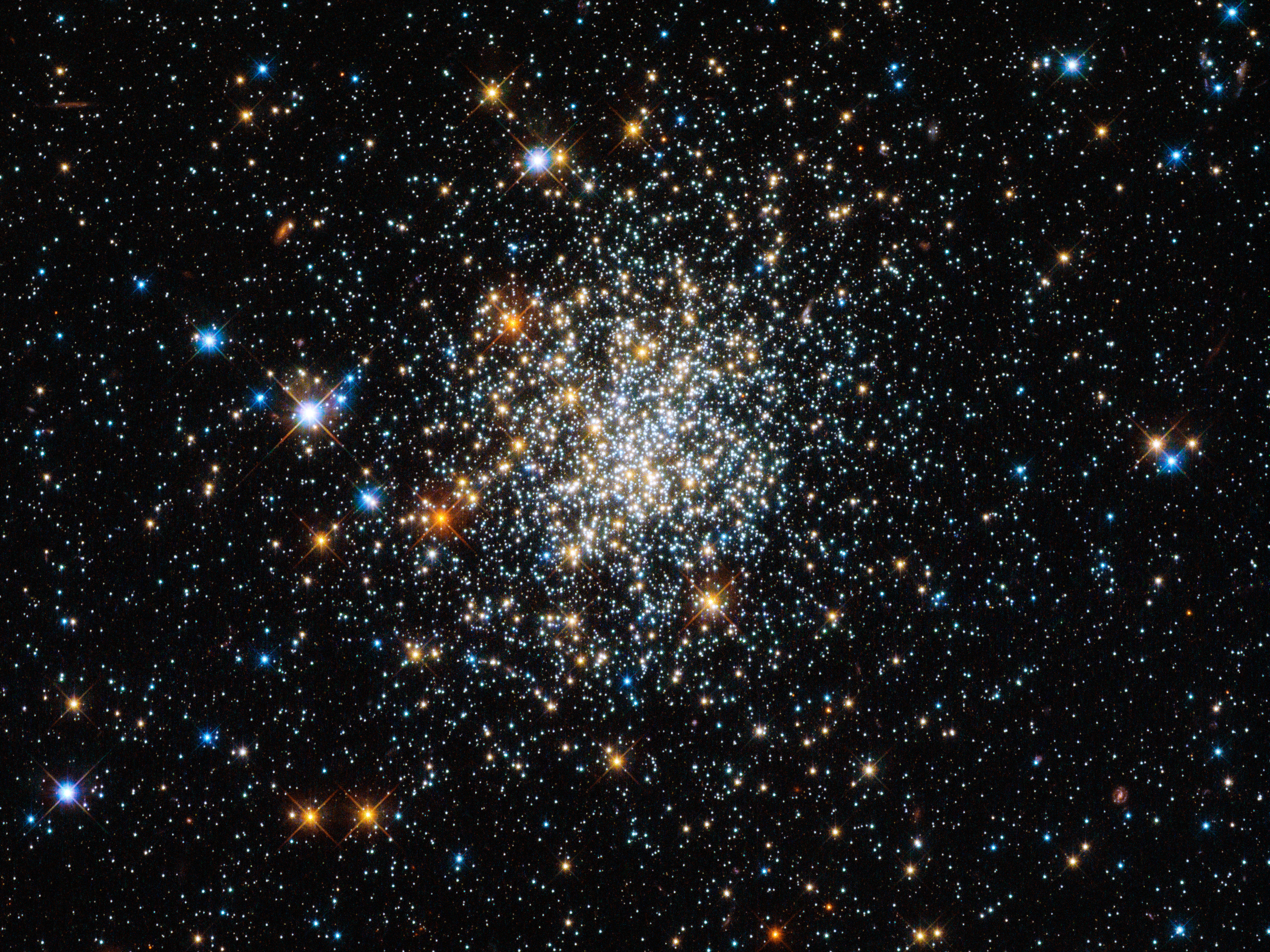
- Hubble Space Telescope image of the open cluster NGC 411; Credit: NASA/ESA

Observation data (J2000 epoch)
- Right ascension: 01^{h} 07^{m} 55.95^{s}
- Declination: −71° 46′ 04.5″
- Distance: 179,000 ± 13,000 ly (55,000 ± 4,000 pc)
- Apparent magnitude (V): 12.1
- Apparent dimensions (V): 2.1′ × 1.9′

Physical characteristics
- Mass: 3.0×10^{4} M_{☉}
- Estimated age: 1.5 billion years
- Other designations: Kron 60, Lindsay 82, ESO 51-19

Associations
- Constellation: Tucana

NGC 411 is a globular cluster located approximately 55,000 pc (180,000 ly) from Earth in the constellation Tucana. It was discovered in 1826 by James Dunlop. It was described by Dreyer as "extremely faint, pretty large, round, gradually very little brighter middle". At a distance of about 180,000 light years (55,000 parsecs), it is located within the Small Magellanic Cloud. It has a mass of about 3.0×10^{4} M_{☉}, and a luminosity of about 8.0×10^{4} L_{☉}.

NGC 411 was imaged by the Hubble Space Telescope in 2013, showing an abundance of stars ranging from blue to red. In particular, this seemed to suggest that the cluster was much younger than previously thought: its age has been estimated at 1.5 billion years old, relatively young in astronomical terms. However, these results have been challenged by another group who state that these young stars may actually just be background stars, and are thus physically unrelated.

== See also ==
- List of NGC objects (1–1000)
