= Tidal shock =

Astronomical phenomenon

A tidal shock occurs when a star cluster or other distributed astronomical object passes by a large mass such as an interstellar cloud, resulting in gravitational perturbation on a time scale that is much less than the mean time for a star to complete an orbit within the cluster. The tidal force from this event can increase the dynamic energy of the cluster, in effect heating it up. This causes the cluster to expand and shed some of the outer stars.

Tidal shocks occur, for example, when a globular cluster passes through the galactic plane or near the core of the Milky Way. These events are an important factor during the early evolution of a globular cluster. They work to truncate the outer part of clusters, thereby limiting the impact of future tidal shocks. Streams of stars shed from a globular cluster as a result of tidal shock can form what are termed tidal tails. These are extended streams of stars that lead away from the cluster. Such streams can be used to trace the orbital path of the cluster.
