= Sphere of influence (black hole) =

Region where a supermassive black hole gravitationally dominates its galaxy

Representation of a black hole within its host galaxy.

In celestial mechanics, the sphere of influence is a region around a supermassive black hole in which the gravitational potential of the black hole dominates the gravitational potential of the host galaxy. The radius of the sphere of influence is called the (gravitational) influence radius.

There are two definitions in common use for the radius of the sphere of influence. The first is given by
$$r_h = G\, \frac{M_\text{BH}}{\sigma^2}$$
where M_{BH} is the mass of the black hole, σ is the stellar velocity dispersion of the host bulge, and G is the gravitational constant.

The second definition is the radius at which the enclosed mass in stars equals twice M_{BH}, i.e.
$$M_\star(r<r_h) = 2 M_\text{BH} .$$

Which definition is most appropriate depends on the physical question being addressed. The first definition takes into account the bulge's overall effect on the motion of a star, since σ is determined in part by stars that have moved far from the black hole. The second definition compares the force from the black hole to the local force from surrounding stars.

It is a minimum requirement that the sphere of influence be well resolved in order that the mass of the black hole be determined dynamically.

== Rotational influence sphere ==
If the black hole is rotating, there is a second radius of influence associated with the rotation. This is the radius inside of which the Lense-Thirring torques from the black hole are larger than the Newtonian torques between stars. Inside the rotational influence sphere, stellar orbits precess at approximately the Lense-Thirring rate; while outside this sphere, orbits evolve predominantly in response to perturbations from stars on other orbits. Assuming that the Milky Way black hole is maximally rotating, its rotational influence radius is about 0.001 parsec, while its radius of gravitational influence is about 3 parsecs.

== See also ==
- Roche limit
- Tidal disruption event § Tidal-disruption radius
