= Sagittarius Star Cloud =

Sagittarius Star Cloud can refer to either:

- Large Sagittarius Star Cloud
- Small Sagittarius Star Cloud
