= Palomar 6 =

Globular cluster in the constellation Ophiuchus

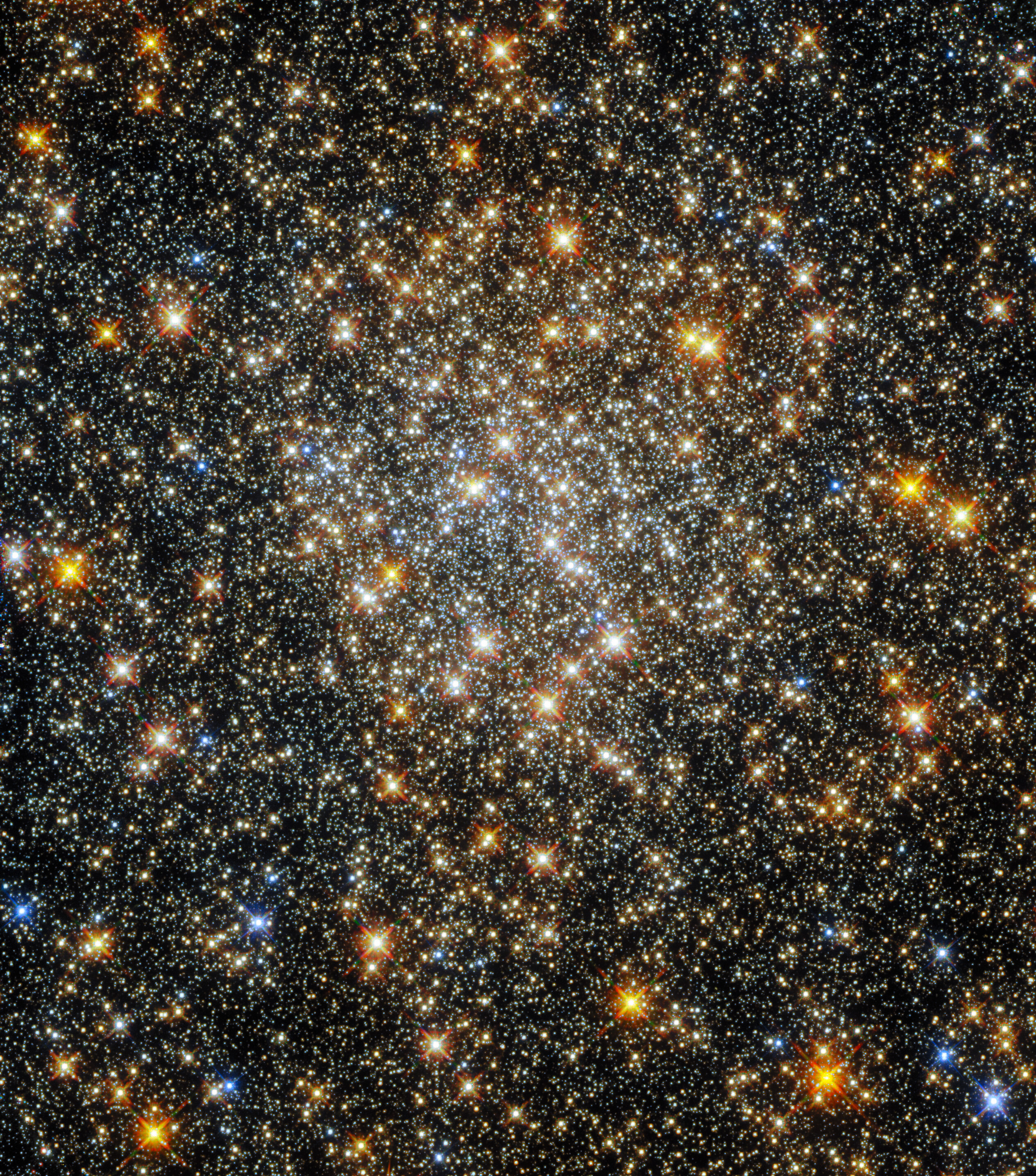

Observation data (J2000 epoch)
- Class: XI
- Constellation: Ophiuchus
- Right ascension: 17^{h} 43^{m} 42.20^{s}
- Declination: −26° 13′ 21.0″
- Distance: 25.02 ± 0.62 kly (7.67 ± 0.19 kpc)

Physical characteristics
- Mass: 2.28×10^{5} M_{☉}
- Metallicity: [Fe/H] = –0.91 dex
- Estimated age: 12.4 ± 0.9 Gyr
- Other designations: ESO 520-21, GCl 75, 1740-262

Palomar 6 is a loose globular cluster in the constellation Ophiuchus that belongs to the Milky Way galaxy. It is a member of the Palomar Globular Clusters group and is located about 25,000 light-years (7,700 parsecs) away from the Sun. It formed in what would become the bulge of the Milky Way and is similar to other old-bulge globular clusters such as Messier 62, NGC 6522, NGC 6558, and Haute-Provence 1.

First discovered on the National Geographic Society – Palomar Observatory Sky Survey plates by Robert G. Harrington and Fritz Zwicky, it was catalogued as a globular cluster, and was thought to be one of four globulars known to contain a planetary nebula. A paper published in 2024, however, showed that the proper motion of the central star of the nebula JaFu 1 differs from that of the cluster with high statistical significance, thus confirming that the nebula is not located within the cluster.
