= Large Sagittarius Star Cloud =

Brightest visible region of the Milky Way

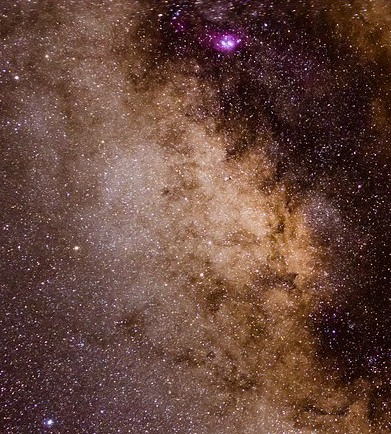
- Large Sagittarius Star Cloud with Lagoon Nebula above

Observation data (J2000 epoch)
- Constellation: Sagittarius
- Right ascension: 18^{h}
- Declination: −29°
- Distance: ~25 kly

Characteristics
- Type: Star cloud
- Size: 260px
- Apparent size (V): 6°x4°

The Large Sagittarius Star Cloud is the brightest visible region of the Milky Way galaxy, a portion of the central bulge seen around the thick dust of the Great Rift which lines the northwest edge. It should not be confused with the nearby Small Sagittarius Star Cloud, which lies about 10° to the north. The star cloud stretches several degrees north from the star Gamma Sagittarii and is considered a splendid sight in binoculars – "a bright glow with multitudes of momentarily resolved star-sparks". To the naked eye, the Cloud appears bright and smooth, and is said to resemble a puff of "steam" escaping from the spout of the Sagittarius "Teapot" asterism.

== Properties ==
The Large Sagittarius Star Cloud is the innermost galactic structure that can be observed in visible wavelengths, and the most distant portion of the Milky Way that can be seen with unaided eyes. Being depleted of the gas and dust from which new stars form, the region contains no young blue stars. Instead, the brightest stars are K-type orange giants, which is why the Cloud has a yellowish tint on color photos.

The Galactic Center, which is obscured at visible wavelengths due to interstellar dust, lies about two degrees west of the Cloud.

== Features ==
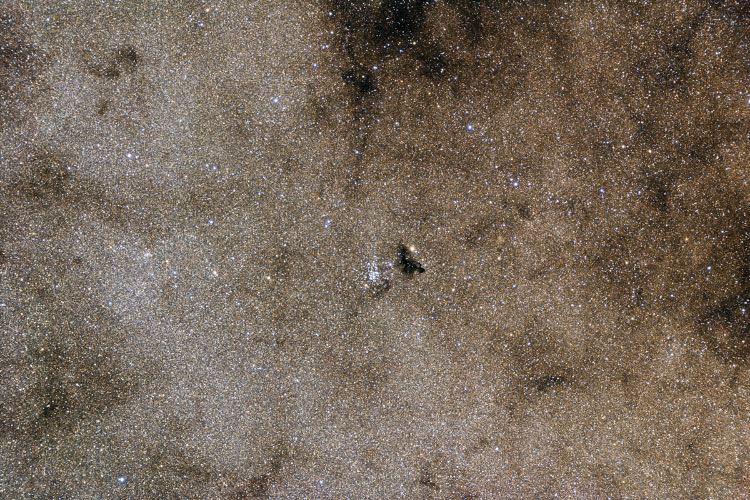
Star cluster NGC 6520 and dark nebula Barnard 86 within the Large Sagittarius Star Cloud

Superimposed upon the Large Sagittarius Star Cloud is the bright open cluster NGC 6520. Close by to the west is the small dark nebula Barnard 86, a Bok globule described by Edward Emerson Barnard as “a drop of ink on the luminous sky”. To the east of this pair lies the globular cluster NGC 6540.

The southern end of the Cloud features a pair of globular clusters, NGC 6522 and NGC 6528, both of which lie within Baade's Window, an area especially clear of interstellar dust.

== Astronomical Survey ==
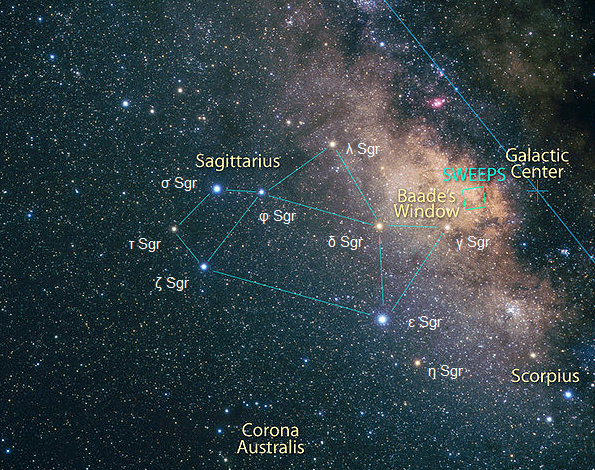
Large Sagittarius Star Cloud showing Baade's Window and SWEEPS target area

The Sagittarius Window Eclipsing Extrasolar Planet Search (SWEEPS) was a 2006 astronomical survey project using the Hubble Space Telescope to monitor 180,000 stars for seven days to detect exoplanets. Sixteen candidate planets were discovered with orbital periods ranging from 0.6 to 4.2 days.

== See also ==
- Milky Way
- Star cloud
- Small Sagittarius Star Cloud
