= Palomar 2 =

Globular cluster in the constellation Auriga

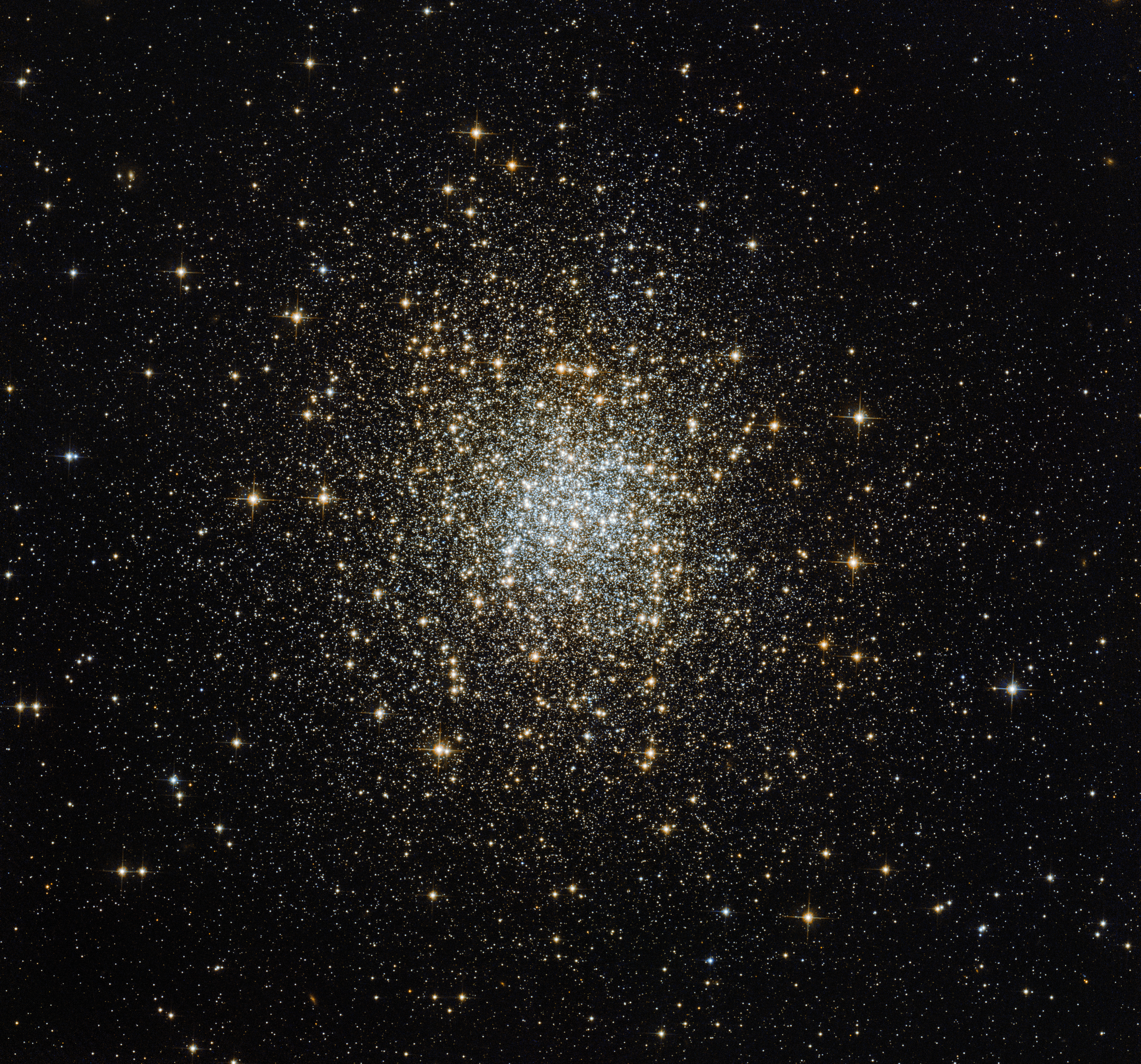
- Palomar 2 is part of a group of 15 globulars known as the Palomar clusters.

Observation data (J2000 epoch)
- Class: IV
- Constellation: Auriga
- Right ascension: 04^{h} 46^{m} 05.91^{s}
- Declination: +31° 22′ 53.4″
- Distance: 90000 ly
- Apparent magnitude (V): 13.04
- Apparent dimensions (V): 2.2'

Physical characteristics
- Other designations: C 0443+313, Cl Pal 2, 2MASX J04460579+3122510, MCG+05-12-001

Palomar 2 is a globular cluster located in the constellation of Auriga. It's part of a group of 15 globulars known as the Palomar Globular Clusters, discovered in survey plates from the first National Geographic Society – Palomar Observatory Sky Survey in the 1950s. However, Palomar 2 is one of the most obscured since we see it dimmed by nearly 3 full magnitudes as it lies behind the Perseus Arm and Norma/Outer Arm of the Milky Way.
