= NGC 6553 =

Globular cluster in the constellation Sagittarius

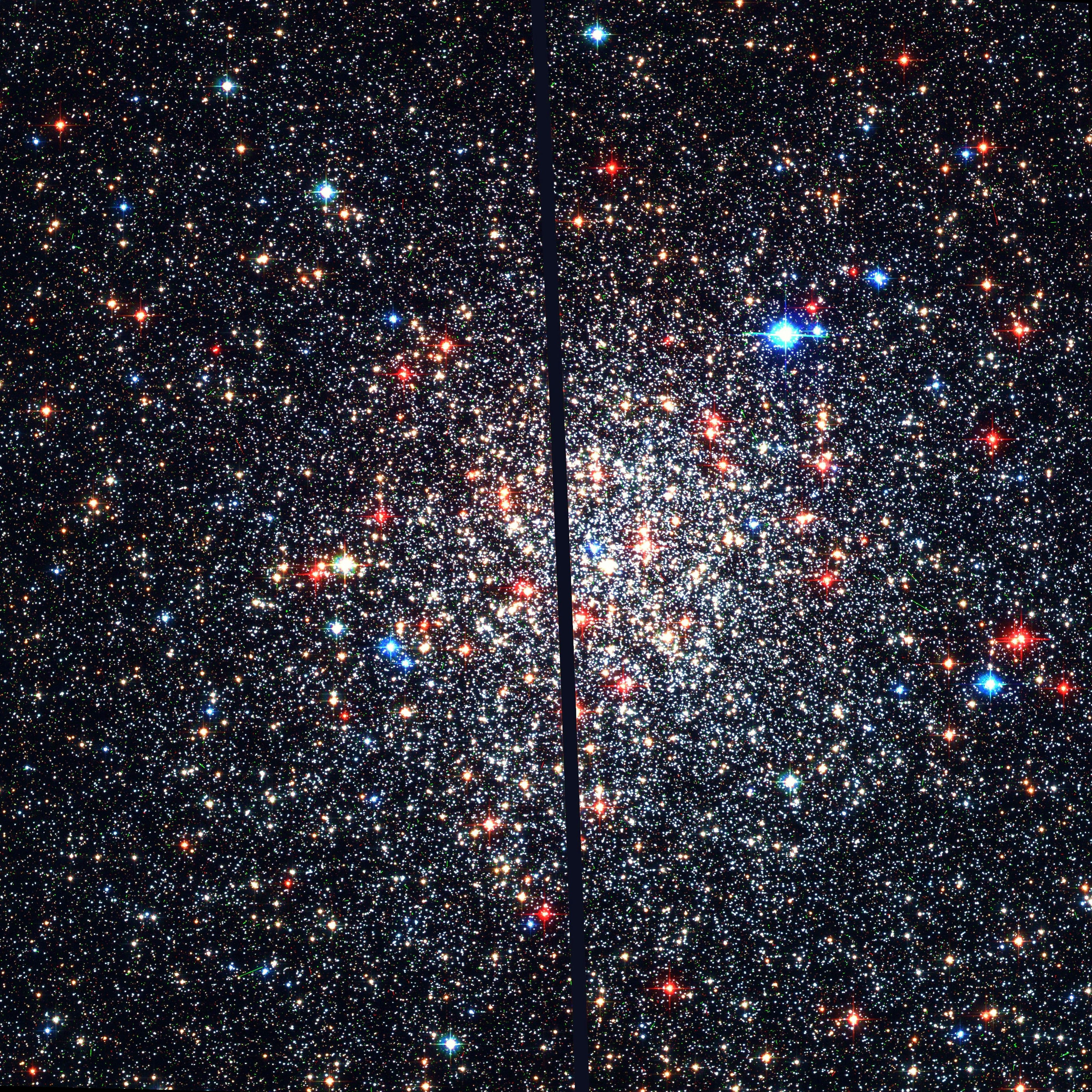
- The globular cluster NGC 6553 imaged by the Hubble Space Telescope

Observation data (J2000 epoch)
- Class: V
- Constellation: Sagittarius
- Right ascension: 18^{h} 09^{m} 15.68^{s}
- Declination: −25° 54′ 27.9″
- Distance: 19.6 kly (6.01 kpc)
- Apparent magnitude (V): 8.06

Physical characteristics
- Radius: 4.1' x 4.1'
- Metallicity: [Fe/H] = −0.18 dex
- Estimated age: 11 ± 0.5 Gyr
- Other designations: GCl 88, C 1806-259

NGC 6553 is a globular cluster in the constellation Sagittarius. NGC 6553 has an apparent magnitude of about 8th magnitude with an apparent diameter of 8.2 arcminutes. Its Shapley–Sawyer Concentration Class is XI, meaning the star concentration is very loose even at the center; it has stars of magnitude 20 and dimmer. It is located just over a degree southeast of Messier 8, the Lagoon Nebula.

Unlike common globular clusters, NGC 6553 is relatively metal-rich, and there is evidence of at least two periods of star formation. Due to a complex star-forming record, the stars in the cluster are differing in composition, most notably in concentrations of sodium and aluminium.

NGC 6553 is very similar in composition to NGC 6528, suggesting an origin in a similar environment.
