= Ursa Major Dwarf =

Ursa Major Dwarf is a name for two dwarf spheroidal galaxies orbiting the Milky Way Galaxy.

- Ursa Major I Dwarf, also called UMa I dSph, was discovered in 2005.
- Ursa Major II Dwarf, also called UMa I| dSph, was discovered in 2006.

== See also ==
- Palomar 4, once thought to be a satellite galaxy, now known to be a globular cluster of the Milky Way
