= NGC 6603 =

Open cluster in the constellation Sagittarius

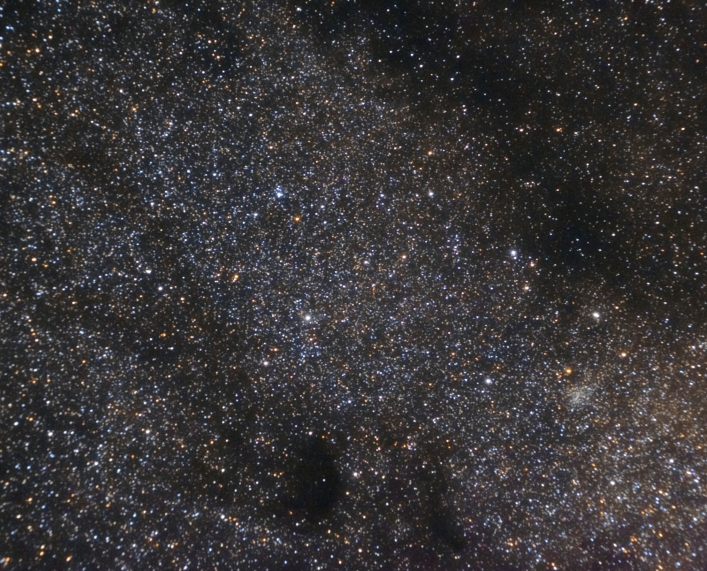
- NGC 6603 (bottom right) in Messier 24

Observation data (J2000.0 epoch)
- Right ascension: 18^{h} 18.4^{m}
- Declination: −18° 25′
- Distance: 10 kly
- Apparent magnitude (V): 11.1
- Apparent dimensions (V): 5′

Physical characteristics
- Other designations: Collinder 374

Associations
- Constellation: Sagittarius

NGC 6603 is an open cluster discovered by John Herschel on July 15, 1830 located in the constellation Sagittarius.

Situated within the brightest part of star cloud Messier 24, it is classified by Shapley as type "g". This cluster consists of about 30 stars in a field of about 5 arc minutes in diameter, and is about 9400 light years remote. Thus its linear diameter should be about 14 light years. The hottest stars are about B9 (pointing to an intermediate age of several 100 million years, an estimate of which is not known to the present author), and the brightest of photographic mag 14.

Many sources improperly identify NGC 6603 as Messier 24.
