= JaFu 1 =

Planetary nebula in the constellation Ophiuchus

Emission nebula
- Planetary nebula
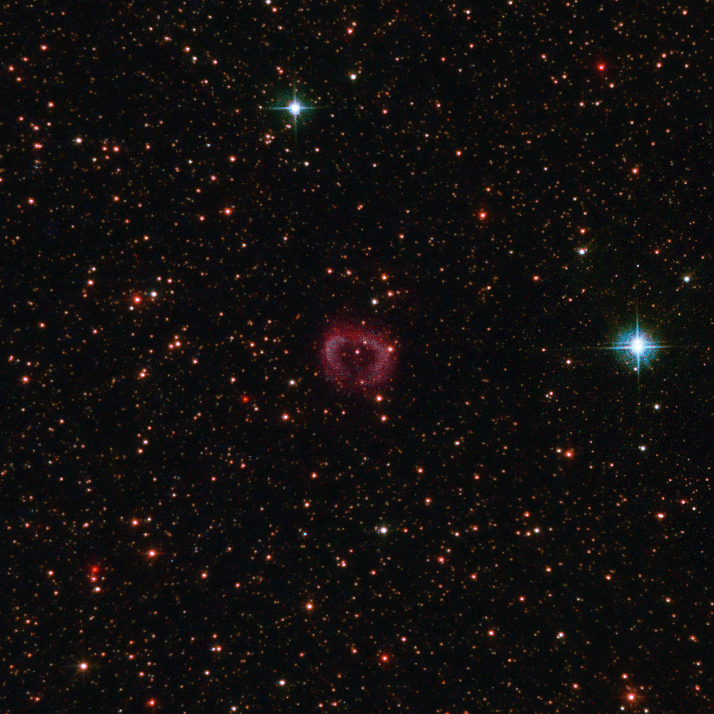
- O III image of JaFu 1

Observation data: J2000 epoch
- Right ascension: 17^{h} 43^{m} 57.380^{s}
- Declination: −26° 11′ 53.98″
- Distance: ~23,800 ly
- Apparent magnitude (V): 23.12
- Apparent diameter: 8"
- Constellation: Ophiuchus

Physical characteristics
- Dimensions: 0.19 × 0.25 pc
- Designations: PK 002+01 4, PN G002.1+01.7, EPIC 251248627

JaFu 1 is a planetary nebula that lies in the galactic bulge near the globular cluster Palomar 6. JaFu 1 was discovered in 1997 by astronomers George H. Jacoby and Kellar L. Fullton while they were carrying out ground-based narrowband [O III] imaging of 133 different globular clusters.

JaFu 1 lies approximately 130" from the center of Pal 6 and the position is heavily dominated by bulge stars, however, JaFu 1 is still within the cluster's tidal radius of approximately 500". The strongest evidence for membership is the emission line RV measurement of +176 ± 15 km s-1 which is similar to the RV measurement of Pal 6 which is +176.3 ± 1.5 km s-1, but there is a chance of a field planetary nebula having a similar RV to the globular cluster which creates a 3% probability against membership. Another reason studies doubt the membership is the interstellar reddening of E(B-V) = 1.93 or 1.67 which is larger than the globular cluster's stars, this is the reason why JaFu 1 is not apart of the globular cluster.

JaFu 1 shows an elliptical ring with diffuse edges. These diffuse edges have minor and major axes of about 5."5 x 7."3, which correspond to physical dimensions of 0.19 × 0.25 pc if the nebula is at a distance of 7 pc. JaFu 1 also has an effective core temperature of ~82,000 K.

== Central star ==
The central star was found to be unusually bright in O III and Hα. These results imply that JaFu 1 belongs to a rare class of EGB 6-type planetary nebulae whose central stars are accompanied by compact emission knots (CEKs). These CEKs are separated by about 0."16 from the central star and the central star is not at the direct center of JaFu 1. The central star is extremely faint (V ≈ 23.12), which is the reason for its unknown spectral type. JaFu 1 has a luminosity of ~570 L_{☉} and a mass of ~0.54 ± 0.01 M_{☉} from the O III and Hα produced by the surrounding gas cloud.
