= Palomar 14 =

Globular cluster

Observation data (J2000 epoch)
- Constellation: Hercules
- Right ascension: 16^{h} 10^{m} 59.00^{s}
- Declination: 14° 57′ 42.0″
- Distance: 244,000 ly (74.7 kpc)
- Apparent magnitude (V): 14.7

Physical characteristics
- V_{HB}: 20.0
- Estimated age: 10 Ga
- Other designations: GCl 38, Arp 1, C1608 + 150

Palomar 14 is a globular cluster located in the constellation Hercules. It is a member of the Palomar Globular Clusters group. Palomar 14 was discovered in 1958 by Sidney van den Bergh and Halton Arp during inspection of the photographic plates from the Palomar Sky Survey. This is a round, diffuse cluster located in the outer halo of the Milky Way galaxy. It is about 3–4 billion years younger than a typical galactic cluster.

The metallicity of the cluster is [Fe/H] = −1.50, indicating a lower abundance of elements with mass greater than helium compared to the Sun. The combined mass of the main sequence stars in the cluster is 1340 ± 50 solar masses, and the combined mass of observed stars within the half-light radius is 6020 ± 50 solar masses. (This is the inner radius of the cluster that emits half the total luminosity.) These mass estimates provide lower bounds for determining the total mass of the cluster. The median radial velocity of stars within the cluster is 72.19 ± 0.18 km/s.

Because of the cluster's location on the outer fringes of the Milky Way, it was used as a test case for modified Newtonian dynamics (MOND). This is an alternative hypothesis to explain the galactic rotation problem.
