= Messier 18 =

Open cluster in the constellation Sagittarius

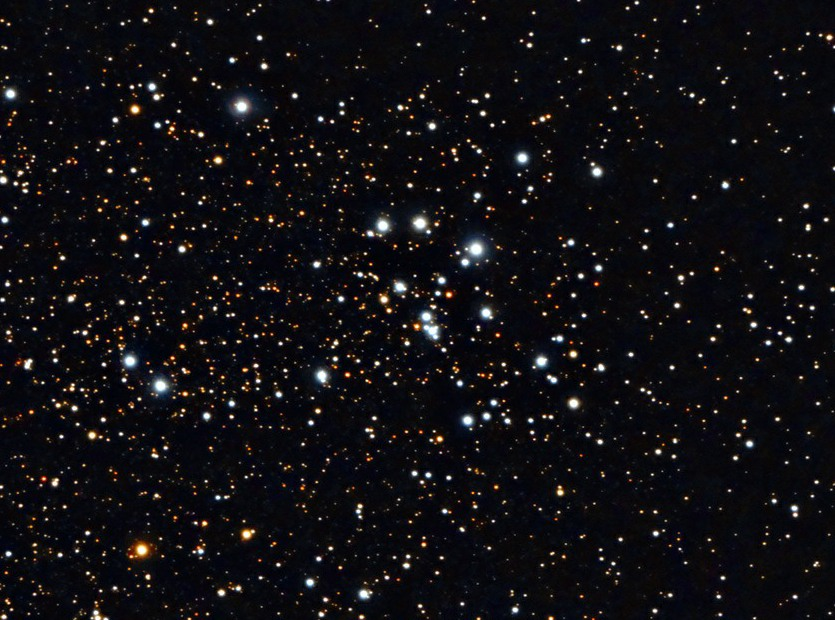
- Open cluster Messier 18 in Sagittarius

Observation data (J2000.0 epoch)
- Right ascension: 18^{h} 19^{m} 58.0^{s}
- Declination: –17° 06′ 06″
- Distance: 4.23 kly (1.296 kpc)
- Apparent magnitude (V): 7.5
- Apparent dimensions (V): 9.8′

Physical characteristics
- Mass: 186+161 −86 M_{☉}
- Radius: 26.2 light-years
- Estimated age: 33×10^{6} years
- Other designations: Messier 18, NGC 6613, Cr 376, OCl 40

Associations

Messier 18 or M18, also designated NGC 6613 and sometimes known as the Black Swan Cluster, is an open cluster of stars in the constellation Sagittarius. It was discovered by Charles Messier in 1764 and included in his list of comet-like objects. From the perspective of Earth, M18 is situated between the Omega Nebula (M17) and the Small Sagittarius Star Cloud (M24).

This is a sparse cluster with a linear diameter of 8.04 pc, a tidal radius of 7.3 pc, and is centrally concentrated with core radius of 0.012 pc. It has a Trumpler class of II 3 p. The cluster is 33 million years old with an estimated mass of 188 M_{☉}. It has one definite Be star and 29 B-type stars in total. There are three supergiant stars, all of class A or earlier. The brightest component (lucida), designated HD 168352, is a B-type giant star with a class of B2 III and a visual magnitude of 8.65.

Messier 18 is 1,296 kpc from the Earth and 6,830 kpc from the Galactic Center. It is orbiting the Milky Way core with a period of 186.5 million years and an eccentricity of 0.02. This carries it to as close as 6.5 kpc to, and as far as 6.8 kpc from the galactic core. It passes vertically through the galactic plane once every 27.4 million years, ranging no more than 80 pc above or below.

As of January 2022, Messier 18 is one of the few remaining objects within the Messier Catalog to not have been photographed by the Hubble Space Telescope.

== Gallery ==
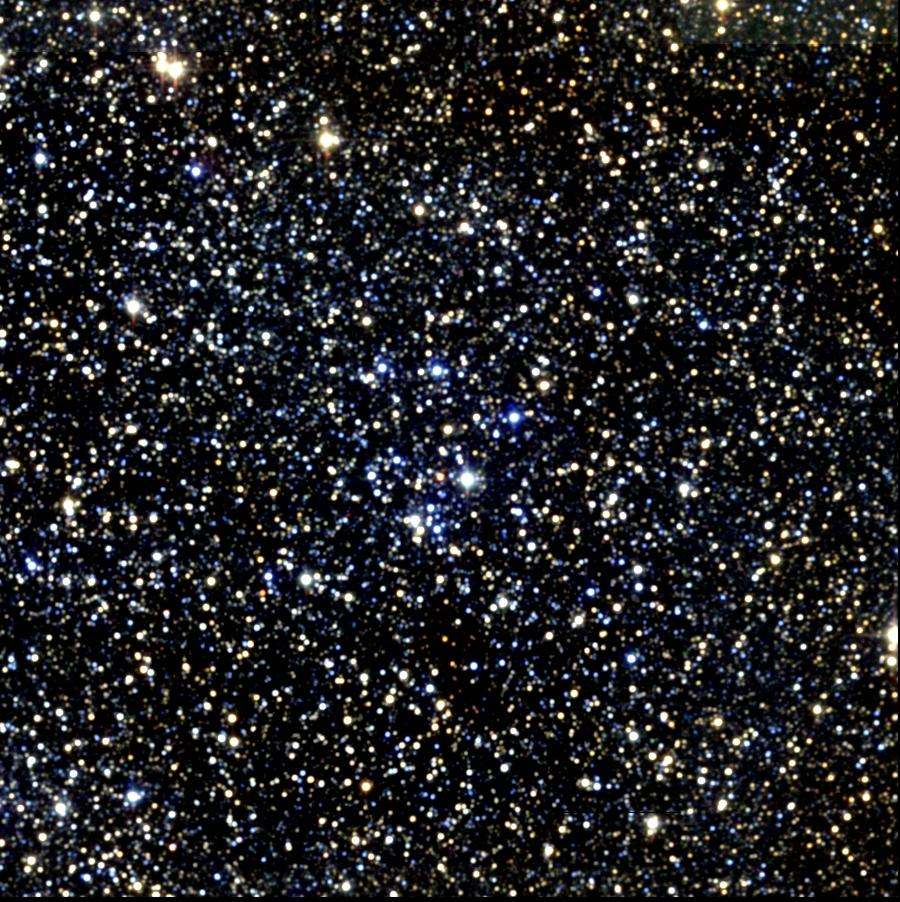
M18 photo from the 2MASS project

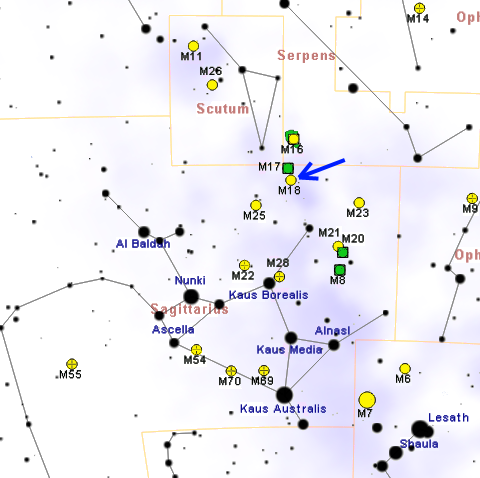
Map showing location of M18 (Roberto Mura)

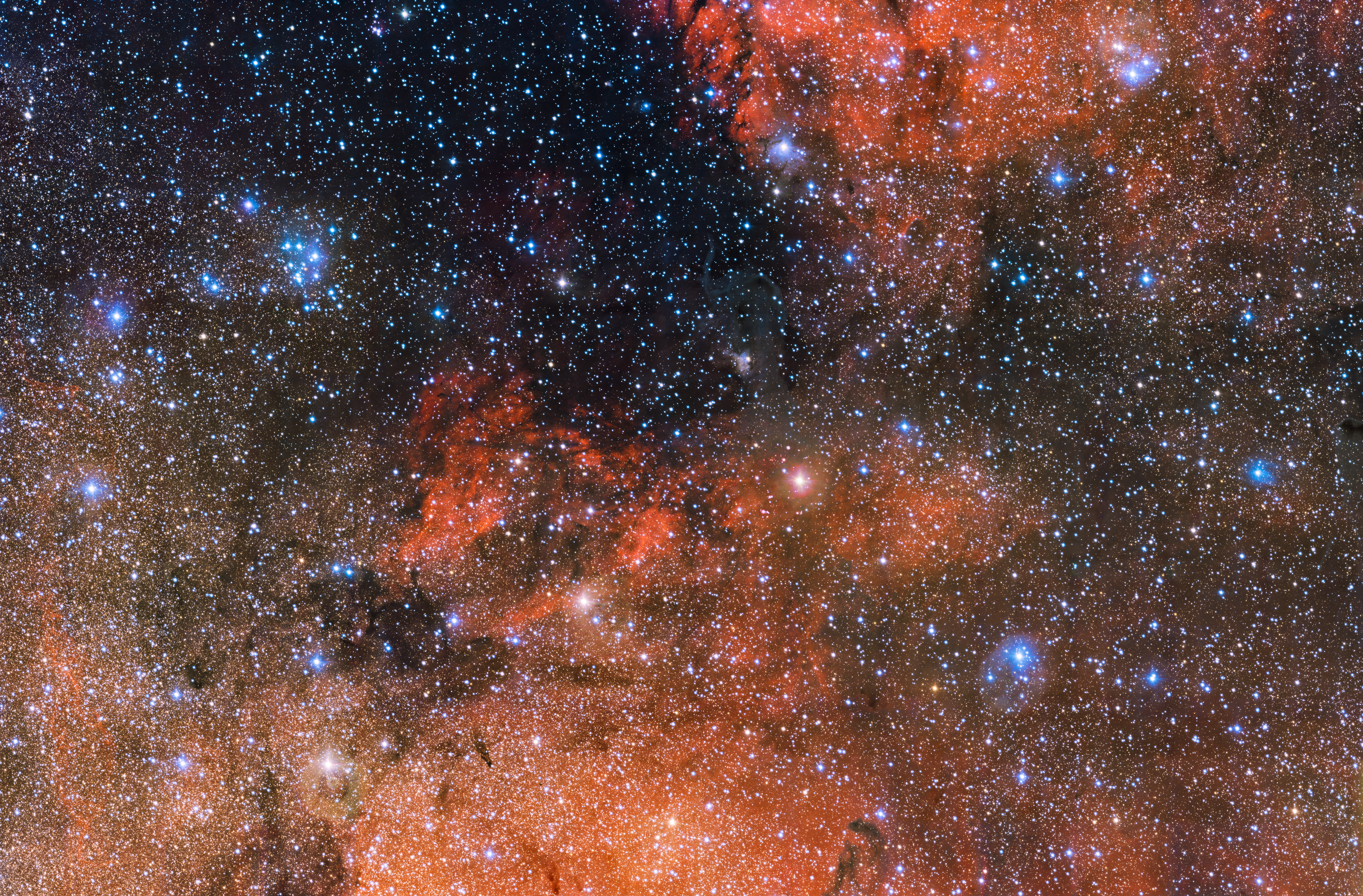
Star cluster Messier 18 (upper left) and its surroundings, taken by the OmegaCAM

== See also ==
- List of Messier objects
