= NGC 6717 =

Globular cluster in the constellation Sagittarius

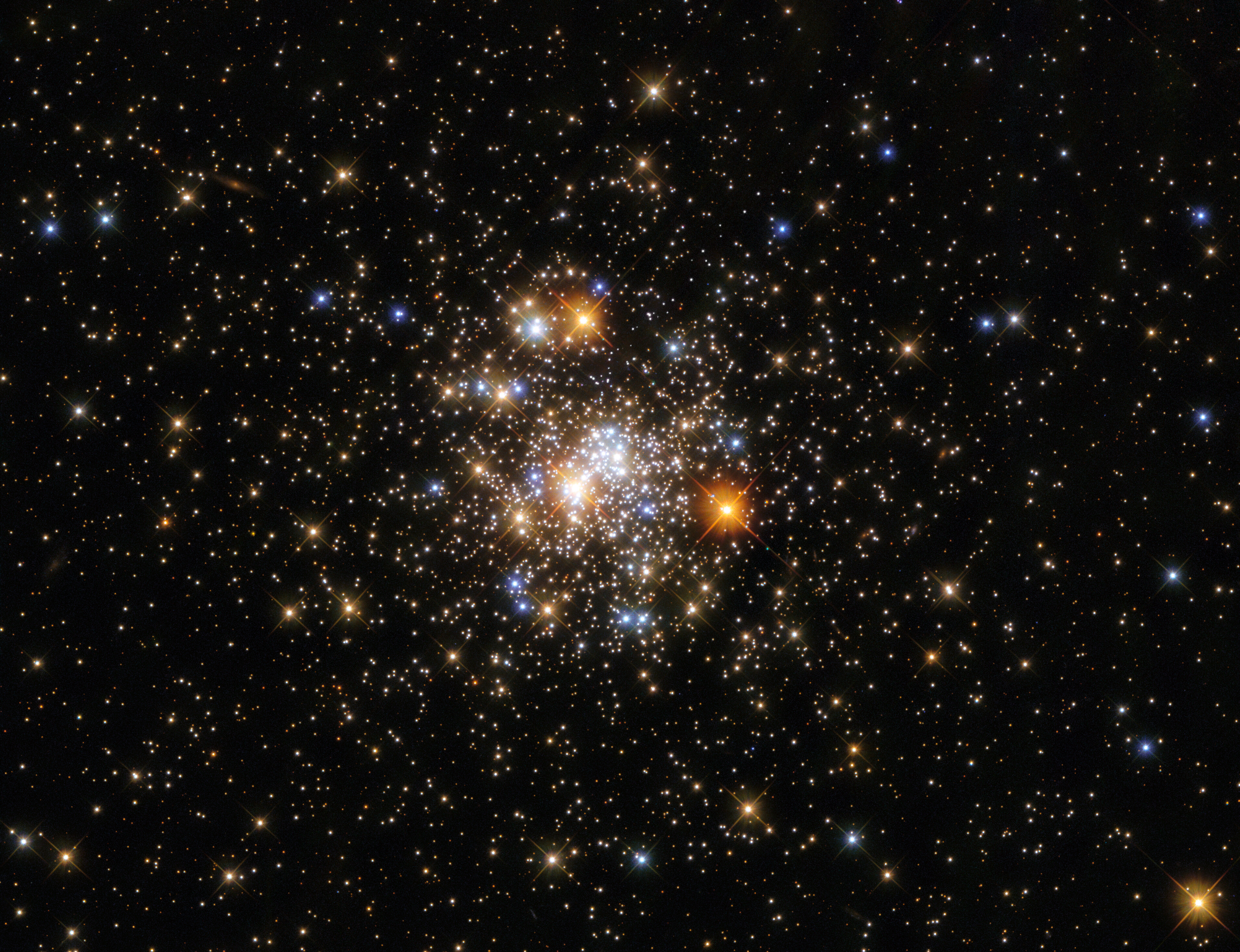
- Hubble Space Telescope image of NGC 6717

Observation data (J2000 epoch)
- Constellation: Sagittarius
- Right ascension: 18^{h} 55^{m} 06.04^{s}
- Declination: −22° 42′ 05.3″
- Distance: 23.8 ± 1.6 kly (7.3 ± 0.5 kpc)
- Apparent magnitude (V): +9.28

Physical characteristics
- Other designations: NGC 6717, Cr 395, ESO 523-14, GCl 105

NGC 6717 (also known as Palomar 9) is a globular cluster in the constellation Sagittarius, and is a member of the Palomar Globular Clusters group. Palomar 9 was discovered by William Herschel on August 7, 1784. It is located about 7,300 parsecs away from Earth.

The globular cluster, which has an apparent magnitude of 9.28 and diameter of 9.9 arcminutes, is located just south of the star ν2 Sagittarii. The bright star region on the north-eastern edge has the separate designation IC 4802.
