= Palomar globular clusters =

Faint globular clusters in the Milky Way galaxy

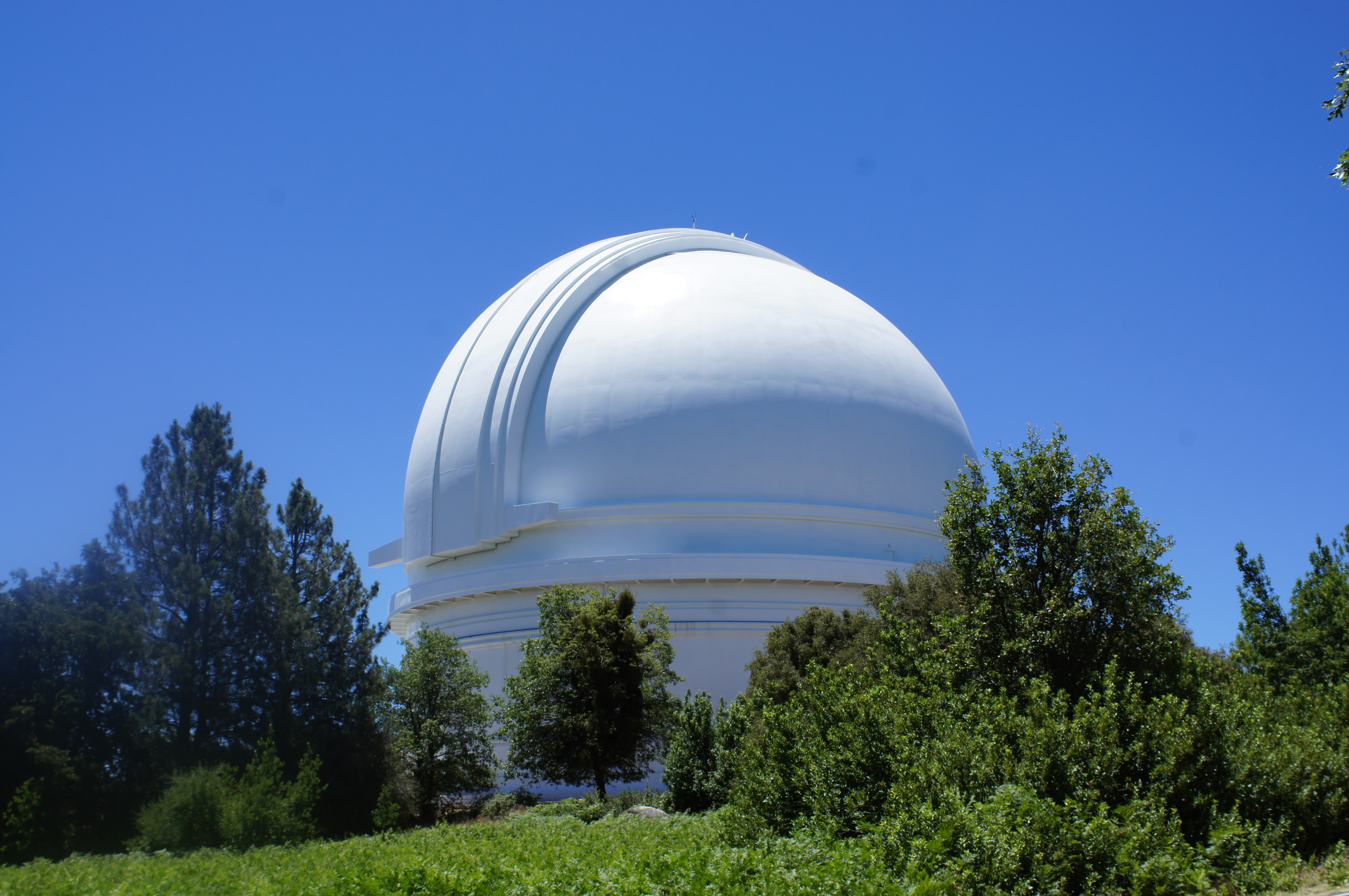
Hale Telescope at Palomar Observatory

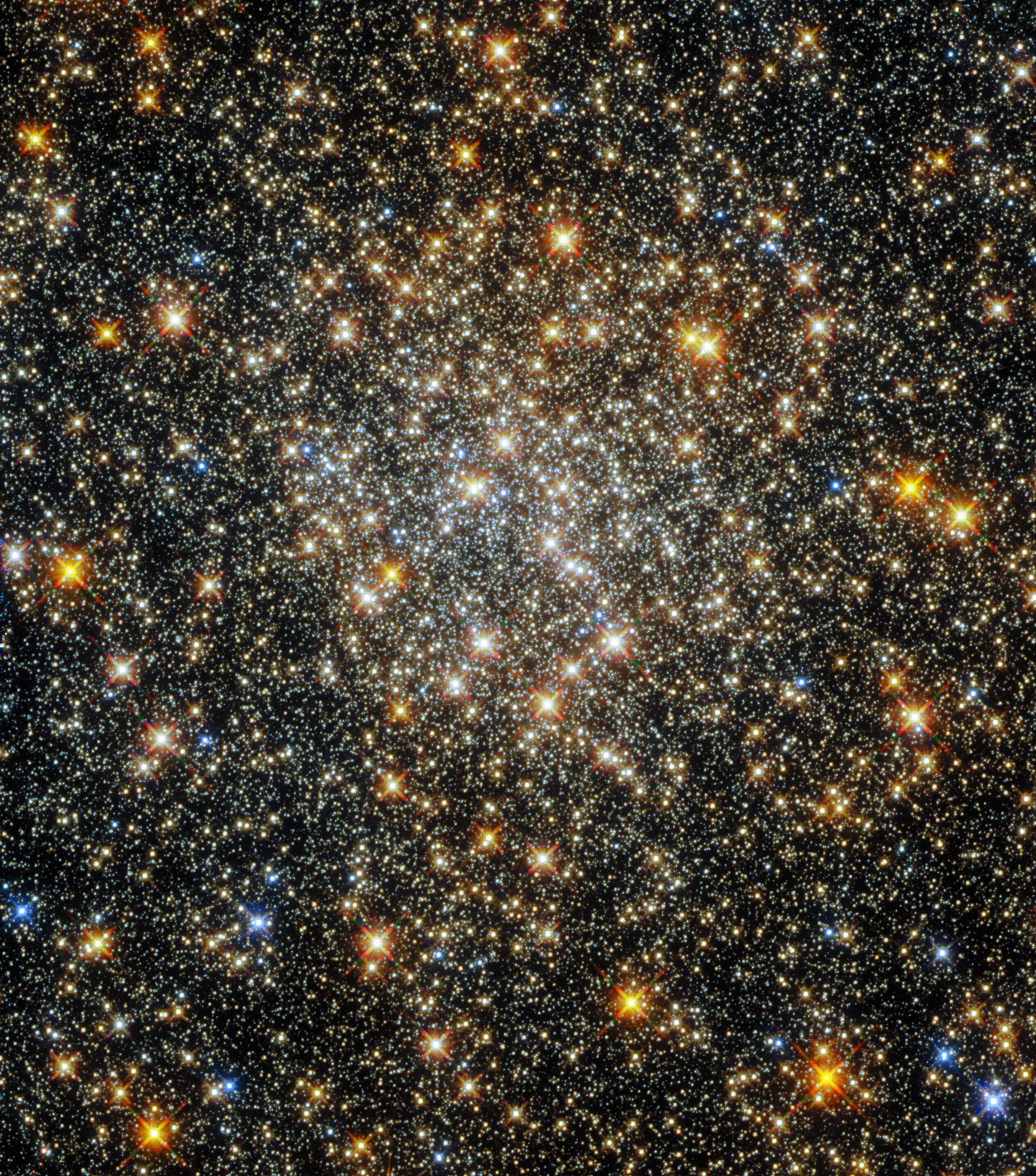
Photo of Palomar 6 taken by the Hubble Space Telescope

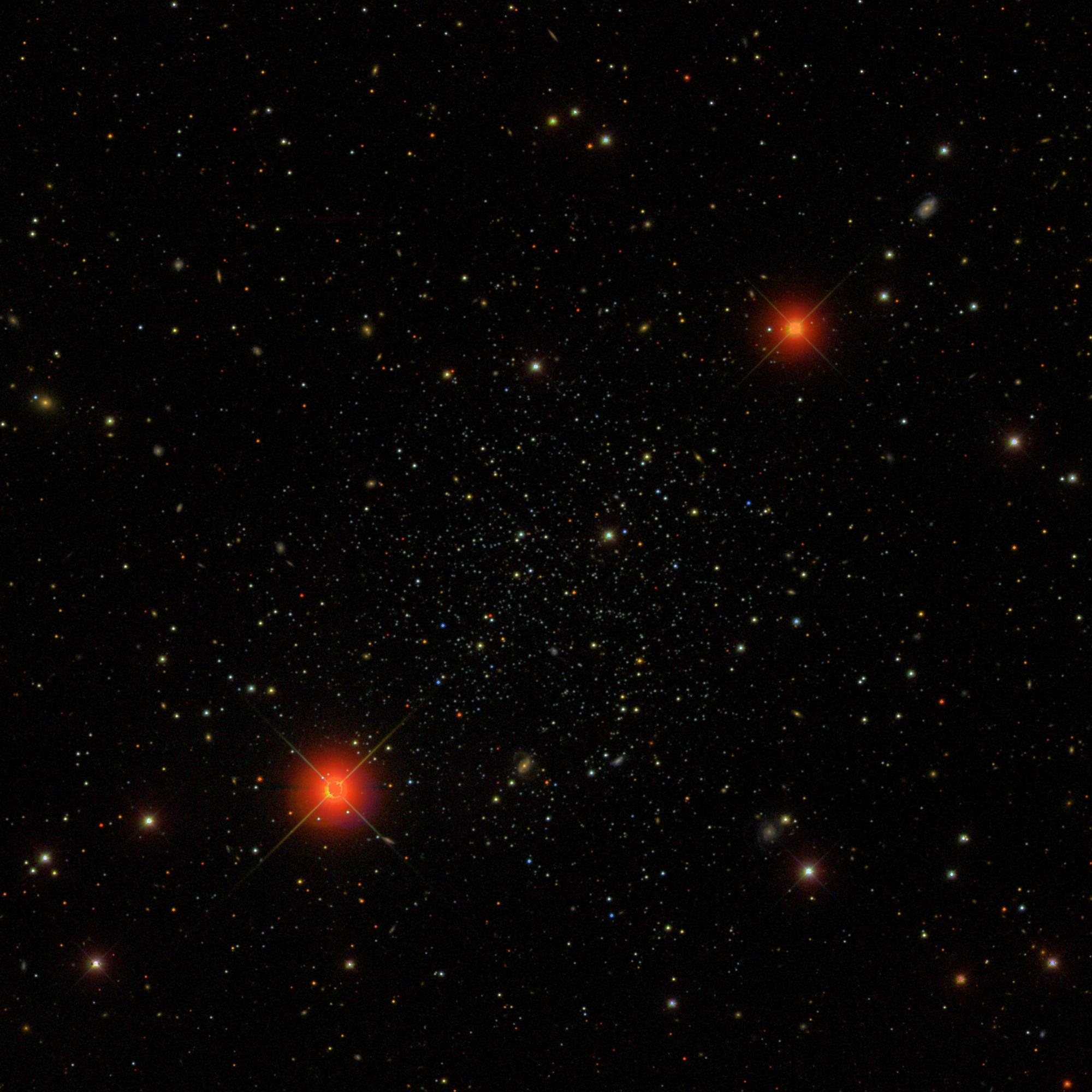
Palomar 5 located between the two bright stars in the bottom left and top right corners.

The Palomar globular clusters are some of the faintest of all globular clusters in the Milky Way galaxy, and were discovered in the 1950s on the survey plates of the first Palomar Observatory Sky Survey (POSS). In total there are 15 Palomar globular clusters: Palomar 1, Palomar 2, Palomar 3, Palomar 4, Palomar 5, Palomar 6, Palomar 7, Palomar 8, Palomar 9, Palomar 10, Palomar 11, Palomar 12, Palomar 13, Palomar 14, and Palomar 15.

Some Palomar globulars, like Palomar 6, Palomar 7, Palomar 9, Palomar 10 and Palomar 11 are clusters of average size located nearby, yet obscured in our line of sight by dust. Other Palomar globulars, like Palomar 3, Palomar 4 and Palomar 14 are giants located in the far outer halo of the Milky Way. Some even originated from a different galaxy, such as Palomar 12 from the Sagittarius Dwarf Spheroidal Galaxy, which is now known as a satellite of the Milky Way. Observation of different Palomar globulars greatly varies in the degree of difficulty depending on the cluster. Some are small and compact, others are very sparse, to the point where they may be hard to distinguish from foreground stars.

== History ==
The Palomar globulars have been discovered fairly late due to them being very faint, heavily obscured, remotely located or having few member stars. For this reason, these were discovered only with the enormous 48-inch Schmidt camera at Palomar. Some of the astronomers who identified these objects as globular clusters include George Abell, Fritz Zwicky, Edwin Hubble, Halton Arp and Walter Baade. All Palomar globulars except two, Palomar 7 (IC1276) and Palomar 9 (NGC6717), have never been seen before. Palomar 9 was observed by William Herschel back on August 7, 1784. Palomar 7 was first discovered by an American astronomer Lewis Swift in 1889, and was independently rediscovered by George Abell as part of the survey in 1952.

== Palomar Globular catalogue ==
Catalogue of Palomar globular clusters
| Palomar | Constellation | RA | DEC | Size (arcmin) | Magnitude | Distance from sun (kly) | Distance from Galactic Centre (kly) |
| 1 | Cepheus | 03h 33m 23.0s | +79d:34m:50s | 2.8 | 13.18 | 35.6 | 55.4 |
| 2 | Auriga | 04h:46m:05.9s | +31d:22m:51s | 2.2 | 13.04 | 90.0 | 115.5 |
| 3 | Sextans | 10h:05m:31.4s | +00d:04m:17s | 1.6 | 14.26 | 302.3 | 312.8 |
| 4 | Ursa Major | 11h:29m:16.8s | +28d:58m:25s | 1.3 | 14.20 | 356.2 | 364.6 |
| 5 | Serpens | 15h:16m:05.3s | -00d:06m:41s | 8.0 | 11.75 | 75.7 | 60.7 |
| 6 | Ophiuchus | 17h:43m:42.2s | -26d:13m:21s | 1.2 | 11.55 | 19.2 | 7.2 |
| 7 (IC 1276) | Serpens | 18h:10m:44.2s | -07d:12m:27s | 8.0 | 10.34 | 17.6 | 12.1 |
| 8 | Sagittarius | 18h:41m:29.9s | -19d:49m:33s | 5.2 | 11.02 | 42.1 | 18.3 |
| 9 (NGC 6717) | Sagittarius | 18h:55m:06.2s | -22d:42m:03s | 5.4 | 9.28 | 23.1 | 7.8 |
| 10 | Sagitta | 19h:18m:02.1s | +18d:34m:18s | 4.0 | 13.22 | 19.2 | 20.9 |
| 11 | Aquila | 19h:45m:14.4s | -0.8d:00m:26s | 10 | 9.80 | 42.4 | 25.8 |
| 12 | Capricornus | 21h:46m:38.8s | -21d:15m:03s | 2.9 | 11.99 | 62.3 | 51.9 |
| 13 | Pegasus | 23h:06m:44.4s | +12d:46m:19s | 0.7 | 13.80 | 84.1 | 87.0 |
| 14 | Hercules | 16h:11m:04.9s | +14d:57m:29s | 2.2 | 14.74 | 241.0 | 225.0 |
| 15 | Ophiuchus | 17h:00m:02.4s | -00d:32m:31s | 3.0 | 14.00 | 145.5 | 123.6 |

== Star chart ==
Chart of Palomar globular clusters

== Visual observation ==
The Palomar globulars can be observed and identified by amateur astronomers, however dark skies and high power are required. Astronomers have made reports on visual observations using 17.5 inch and larger telescopes, while others have identified the brightest Palomar globulars with more modest sizes of 10 inch telescopes or less. Overall, there is great variability in the level of difficulty to observe these objects, yet, for successful observation, skies with no light-pollution and excellent seeing conditions coupled with high power (at least 200 power magnification) are necessary. Many Palomars are small objects and require the observer to know how to navigate the sky precisely, and rely on averted vision when needed. In some Palomars, visual observers can resolve individual stars, while others look hazy. Palomar 9 (NGC 6717) is the easiest object to observe of the Palomar globulars, while Palomar 15 is regarded as the most difficult.
