= NGC 6520 =

Open cluster in the constellation Sagittarius

- NGC 6520 and dark nebula Barnard 86

Observation data (J2000 epoch)
- Right ascension: 18^{h} 03^{m} 25.4^{s}
- Declination: −27° 53′ 02″
- Distance: 5,235 ly (1,605.0 pc)
- Apparent magnitude (V): 7.6
- Apparent dimensions (V): 6.0′

Physical characteristics
- Mass: 364±54 M_{☉}
- Estimated age: 178 Myr
- Other designations: Cr 361, Mel 187

Associations
- Constellation: Sagittarius

NGC 6520 is an open cluster of stars in the southern constellation of Sagittarius, about 4° to the east of the Galactic Center. Alternatively, it is called the Castaway Cluster or Dead Man's Chest by Stephen James O'Meara. With an apparent visual magnitude of 7.6 and an angular size of 6.0′, it can be viewed with binoculars or a small telescope. Just to the west of this cluster is the dark nebula Barnard 86, dubbed the Ink Spot. Both features are viewed against the dense stary background of the Large Sagittarius Star Cloud. This cluster is located at a distance of approximately 5,235 ly from the Sun.

This is a young open cluster of stars with age estimates yielding a values of 150 to 190 million years. However, the presence of stars with a spectral class of B4 and B5 suggest a much younger age of 60 million years. The estimated mass of this cluster is 364±54 M_{☉}. The cluster and the nearby dark nebula Barnard 86 have radial velocities that differ by 30 km/s, and hence may be unrelated.

Two type 2 chemically peculiar stars and two Lambda Bootis candidates have been found among the members. Polarization measurements of the cluster members suggests that there are three closer dust layers partially obscuring the view from the perspective of the Earth.

== Gallery ==
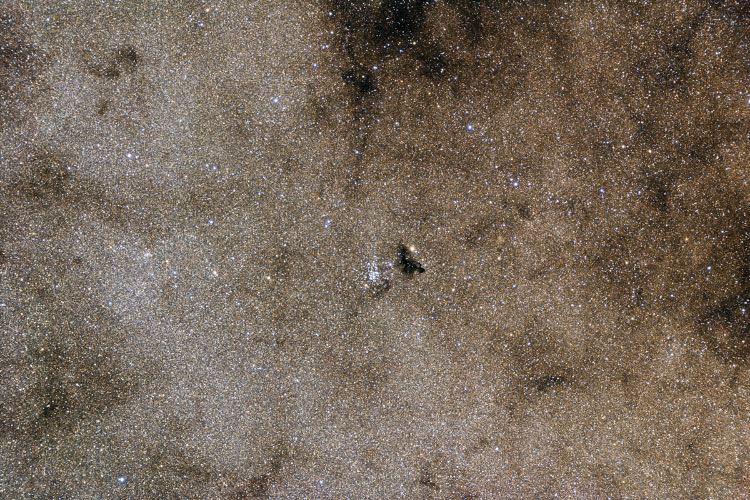
Star cluster NGC 6520 and dark nebula Barnard 86 within the Large Sagittarius Star Cloud

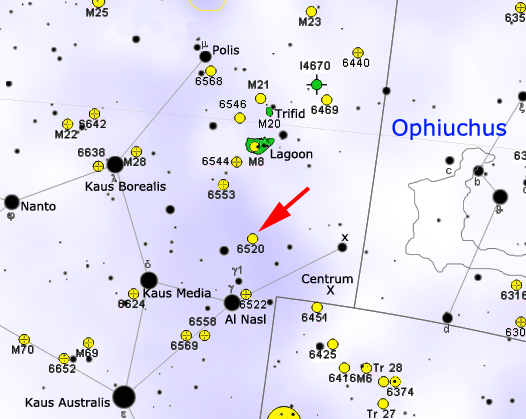
Map showing the location of NGC 6520

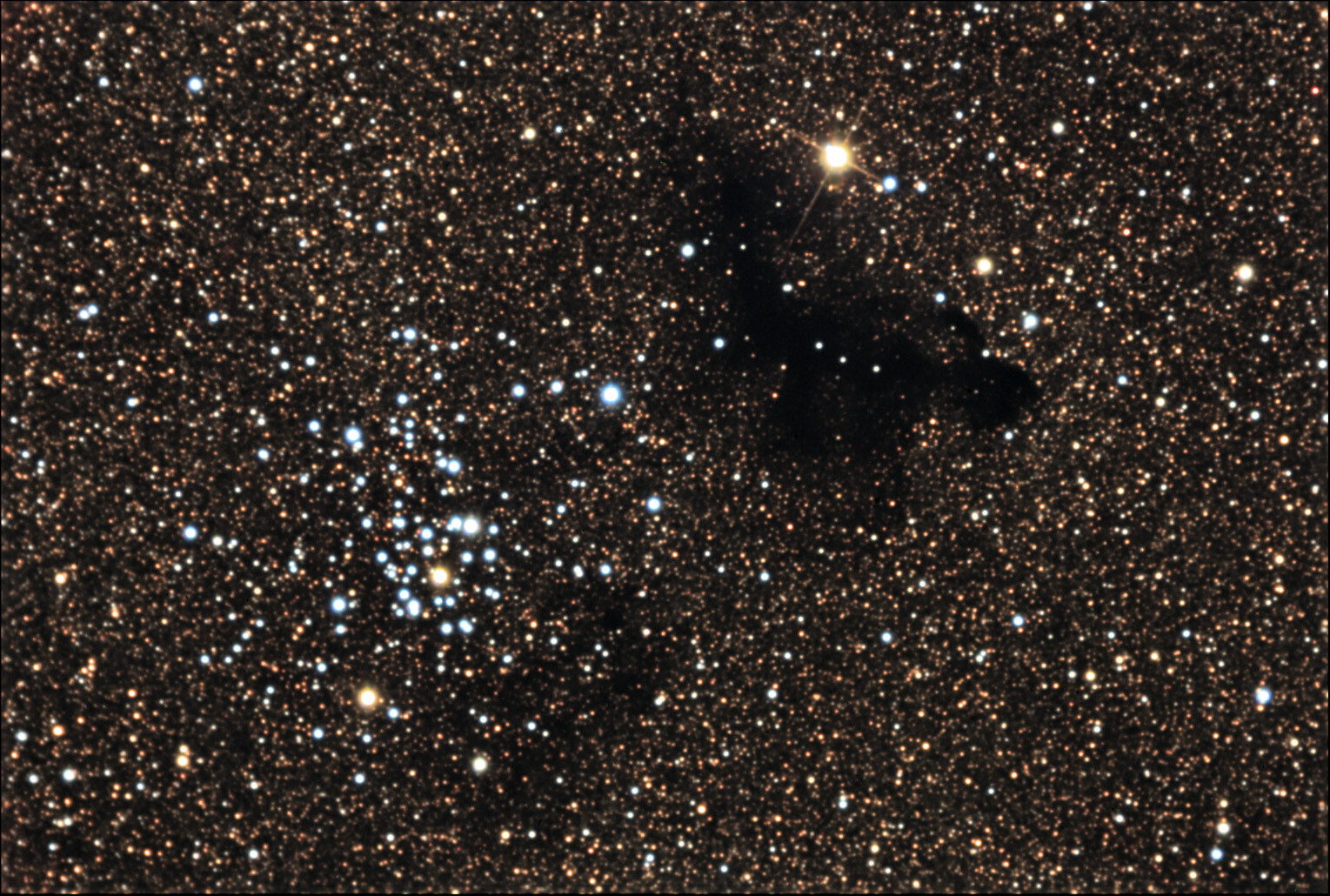
Kitt Peak image
