= Baade's Window =

Gap in interstellar dust allowing for observation of the center of the Milky Way Galaxy

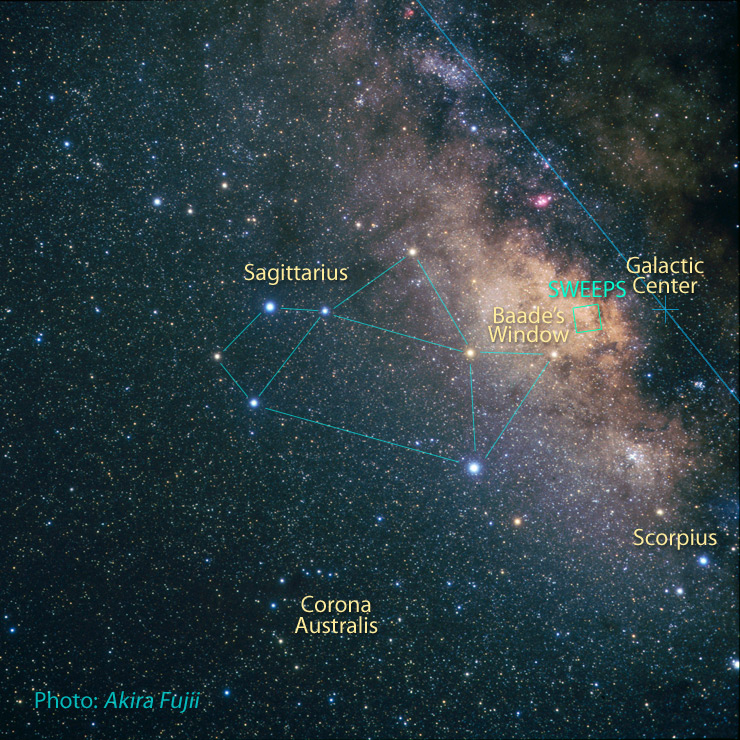
Baade's Window on the Milky Way

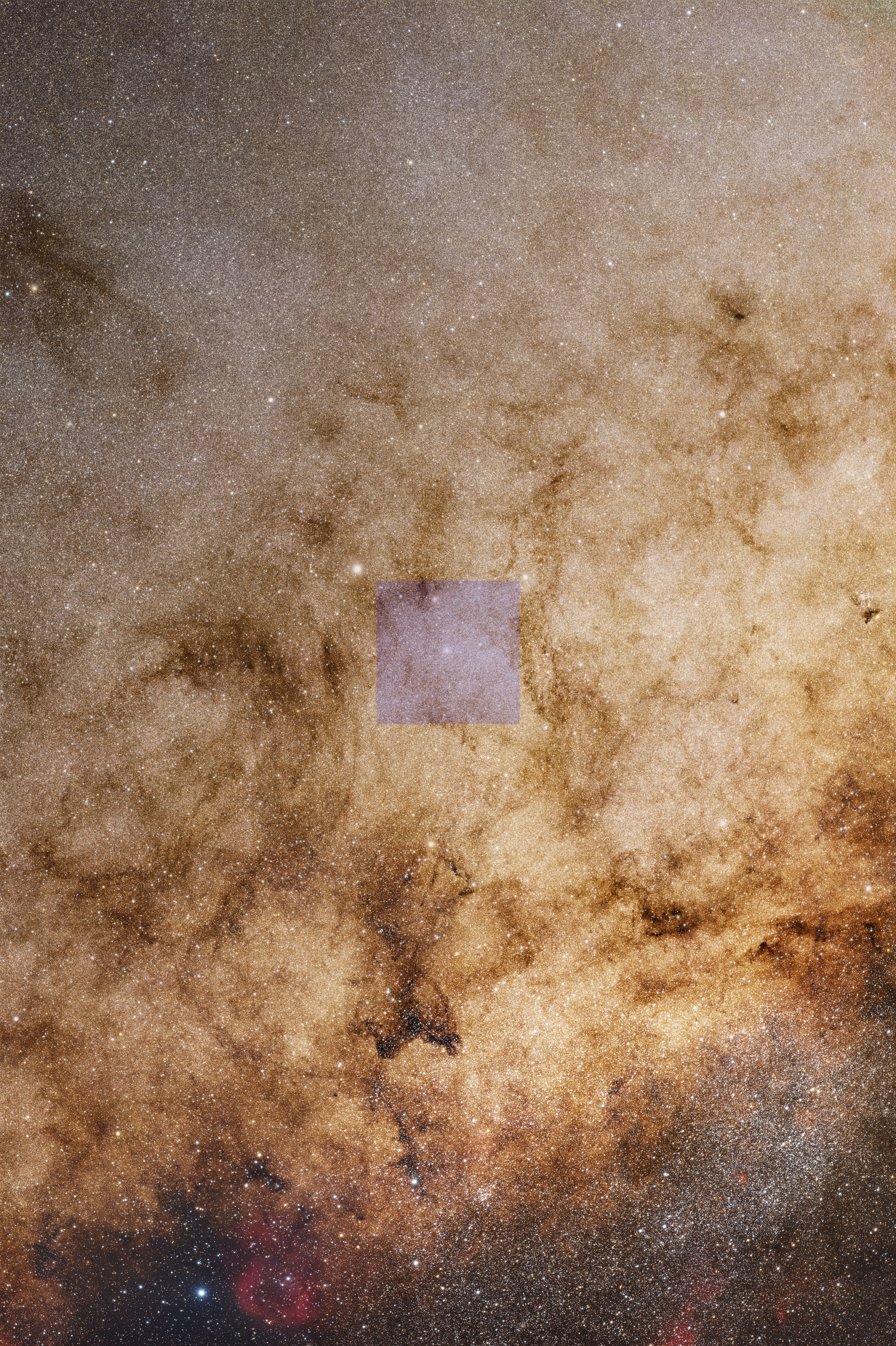
Near-Center of the Milky Way with Baade's Window shaded.

Baade's Window is an area of the sky with relatively low amounts of interstellar dust along the line of sight from Earth. This area is considered an observational "window" as the normally obscured Galactic Center of the Milky Way is visible in this direction. This makes the apparent Large Sagittarius Star Cloud visible.

It is named for German astronomer Walter Baade, who first recognized its significance. This area corresponds to one of the brightest visible patches of the Milky Way. It is centered at a galactic longitude (l) of 1.02° and a galactic latitude (b) of -3.92°, which corresponds to a right ascension of 18h 03m 32.14s and a declination of -30d 02m 06.96s, in the direction of the constellation Sagittarius.

== History ==
Walter Baade observed the stars in this area in the mid-1940s using the 100-inch (2.5 m) Hooker telescope at Mount Wilson Observatory in California while searching for the center of the Milky Way galaxy. Up until this time the structure and location of the galactic center was not known with certainty.

In 2006, the Sagittarius Window Eclipsing Extrasolar Planet Search (SWEEPS) conducted an astronomical survey to monitor 180,000 stars for seven days to detect extrasolar planets via the transit method.

== Significance ==
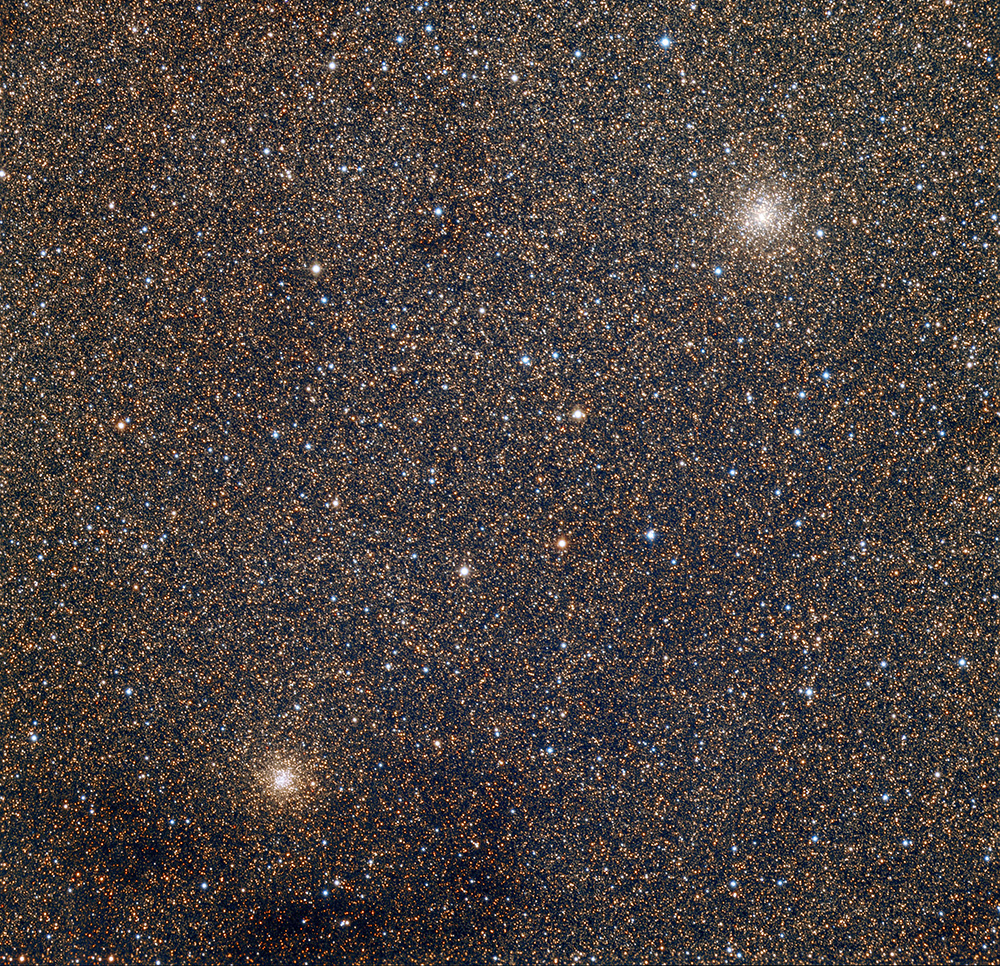
NGC 6522 (upper right) and NGC 6528 (lower left) are visible within Baade's Window.

Baade's Window is frequently used to study distant central bulge stars in visible and near-visible wavelengths of light. Important information on the internal geometry of the Milky Way is still being refined by measurements made through this "window". The window is now known to be slightly "south" of the main central galaxy bulge. The window is irregular in outline and subtends about 1 degree of the sky. It is centered on the globular cluster NGC 6522.

Baade's Window is the largest of the six areas through which central bulge stars are visible.

OGLE and other observation programs have successfully detected extrasolar planets orbiting around central bulge stars in this area by the gravitational microlensing method.

Stars observed in Baade's Window can be called BW stars, similarly giant stars can be called BW giants.

== See also ==
- Zone of Avoidance
- Large Sagittarius Star Cloud
