= Palomar 4 =

Globular cluster in the constellation Ursa Major

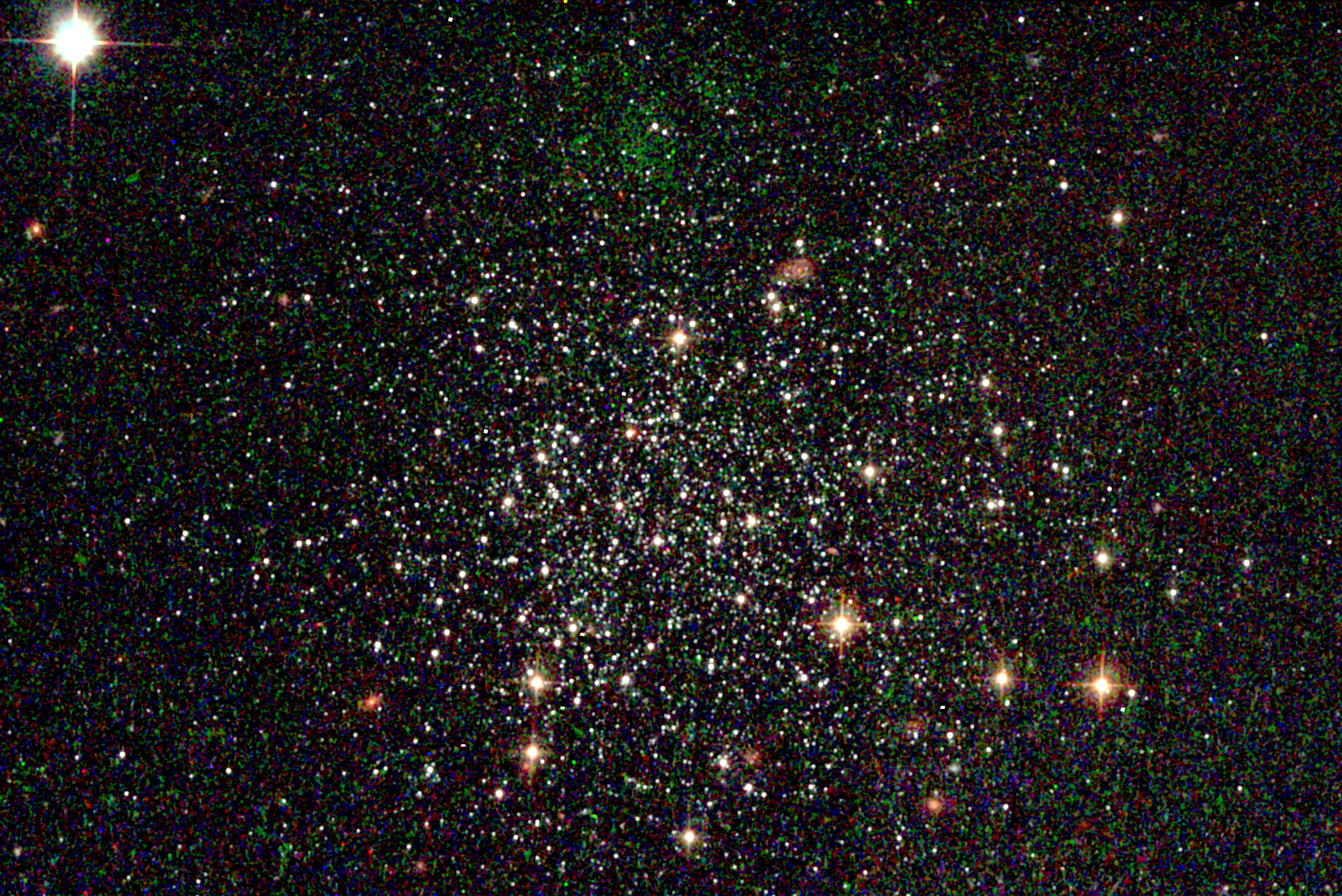
- The globular cluster Palomar 4, taken by the Hubble Space Telescope

Observation data (J2000 epoch)
- Constellation: Ursa Major
- Right ascension: 11^{h} 29^{m} 16.8^{s}
- Declination: +28° 58′ 25″
- Distance: 326 kly (100 kpc)

Physical characteristics
- Other designations: UGCA 237, GCl 17

Palomar 4 is a globular cluster of the Milky Way galaxy belonging to the Palomar Globular Clusters group. It was discovered in 1949 by Edwin Hubble and again in 1955 by A. G. Wilson. It is calculated to be 100,000 parsecs (330,000 light-years) from the Sun.

This star cluster is further away than the SagDEG satellite galaxy.

Initially it was thought to be a dwarf galaxy, and it was given the name Ursa Major Dwarf. However, it was later discovered to be a globular cluster.

== See also ==
- Ursa Major Dwarf
