= Palomar 5 =

Globular cluster in the constellation Serpens

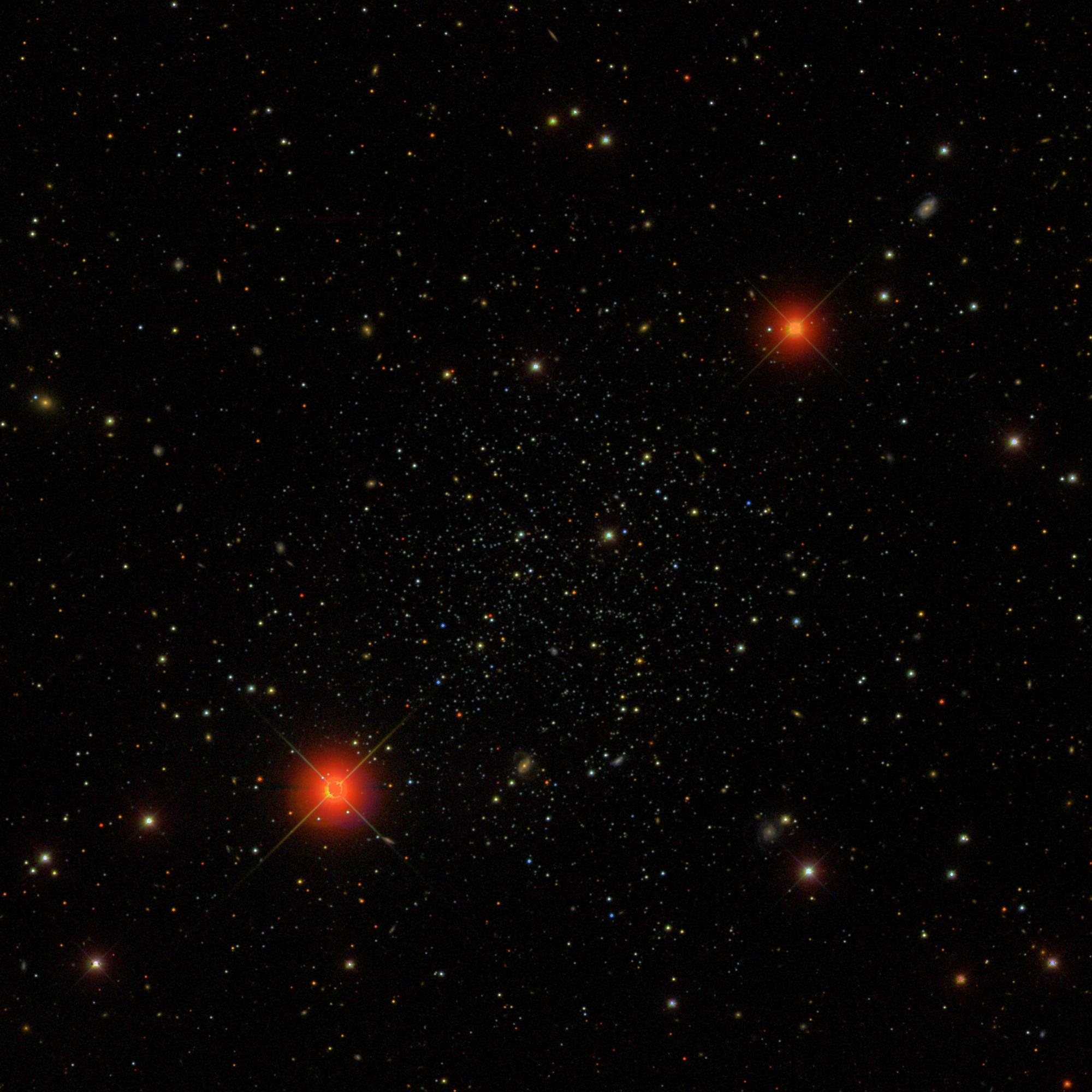

Observation data (J2000 epoch)
- Class: XII
- Constellation: Serpens
- Right ascension: 15^{h} 16^{m} 05.3^{s}
- Declination: –00° 06′ 41″
- Distance: 76 kly (23 kpc)
- Apparent magnitude (V): +11.75
- Apparent dimensions (V): 6.9′

Physical characteristics
- Mass: 3.00×10^{4} M_{☉}
- Radius: 76 ly
- Estimated age: 11.5±1.0 Gyr
- Notable features: Erroneously thought to be a dwarf galaxy
- Other designations: UGC 9792, GCl 32

Palomar 5 is a globular cluster in the constellation Serpens and a member of the Palomar Globular Clusters group. It was discovered by Walter Baade in 1950, and independently found again by Albert George Wilson in 1955. After the initial name of Serpens, it was subsequently catalogued as Palomar 5.

There is a process of disruption acting on this cluster because of the gravitation of the Milky Way – in fact there are many stars leaving this cluster in the form of a stellar stream. The stream has a mass of 5000 solar masses and is 30,000 light years long. The cluster is currently 60.6 kly (18.6 kpc) from the Galactic Center. It shows a noticeable amount of flattening, with an aspect ratio of 0.62 ± 0.23 between its semimajor axis and semiminor axis.

The cluster is mainly known for its unusually high density of black holes. It is predicted that in about 1 billion years, the cluster will dissipate completely, as the black holes will have kicked all the stars from the cluster, effectively turning the cluster into a black hole-only cluster.

== See also ==
- List of globular clusters
- List of stellar streams
