= NGC 6528 =

Globular cluster in the constellation Sagittarius

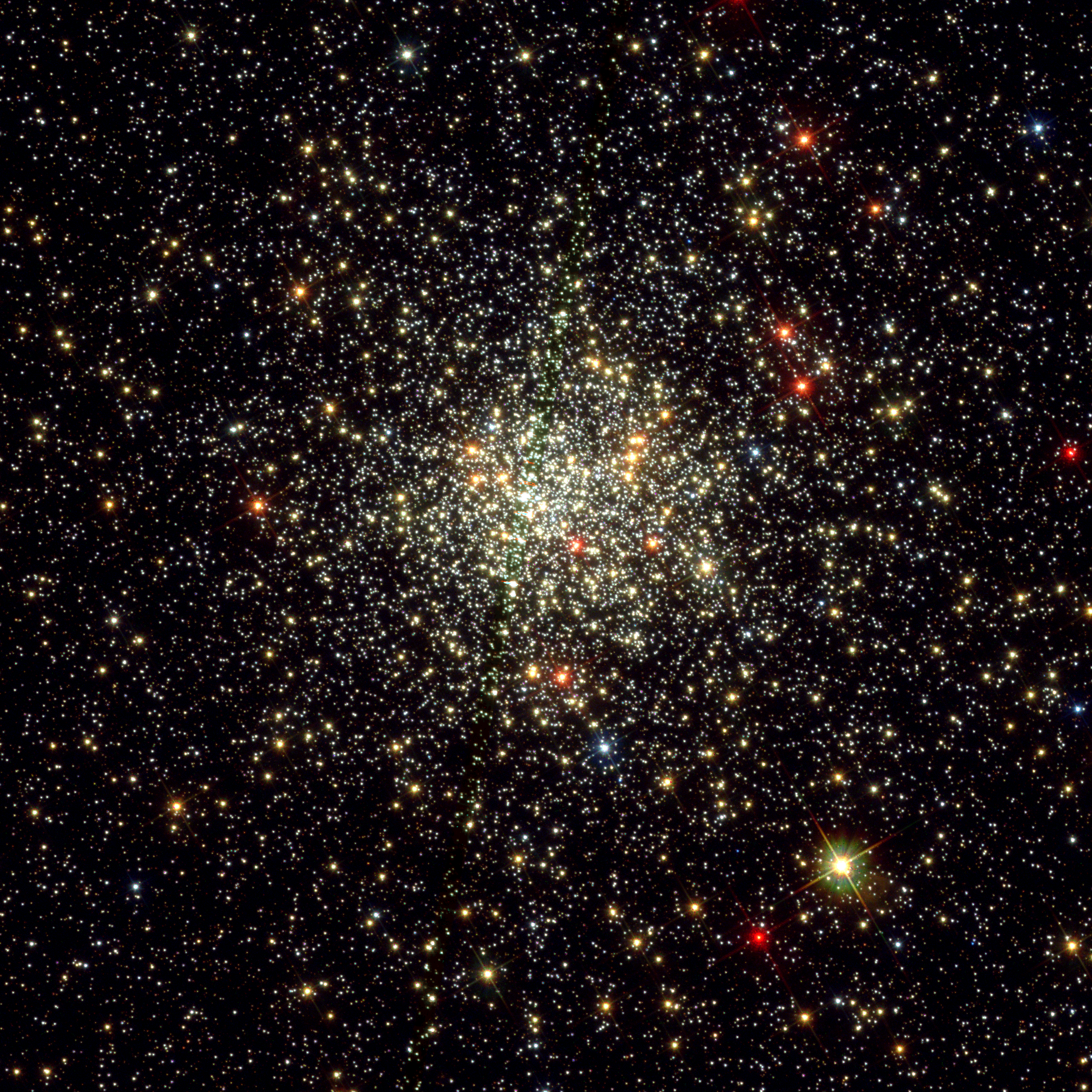
- The globular cluster NGC 6528, imaged by the Hubble Space Telescope

Observation data (J2000 epoch)
- Class: V
- Constellation: Sagittarius
- Right ascension: 18^{h} 04^{m} 49.61^{s}
- Declination: −30° 03′ 20.8″
- Distance: 25.8 kly (7.9 kpc)
- Apparent magnitude (V): 10.65

Physical characteristics
- Radius: 8.3' x 8.3'
- Metallicity: [Fe/H] = −0.11 dex
- Estimated age: 11 ± 0.5 Gyr
- Other designations: GCl 84, ESO 456-48, VDBH 257

NGC 6528 is a globular cluster in the constellation Sagittarius, and is listed in the New General Catalogue. It has an apparent magnitude of about 11 and a diameter of about 16 arcminutes, and its Shapley–Sawyer Concentration Class is V, containing stars of 16th magnitude and dimmer. Dreyer described it as "pF, cS, R", meaning poor and faint, considerably small and round.

NGC 6528 is located southwest of NGC 6522, another globular cluster. Both are located in Baade's Window, a relatively clear area near the galactic equator.

The globular cluster was discovered in 1784 by the astronomer William Herschel with his 18-inch telescopes.

The NGC 6528 is unusually metal-rich for a globular cluster, and is very similar in composition to NGC 6553, suggesting an origin in a similar environment.

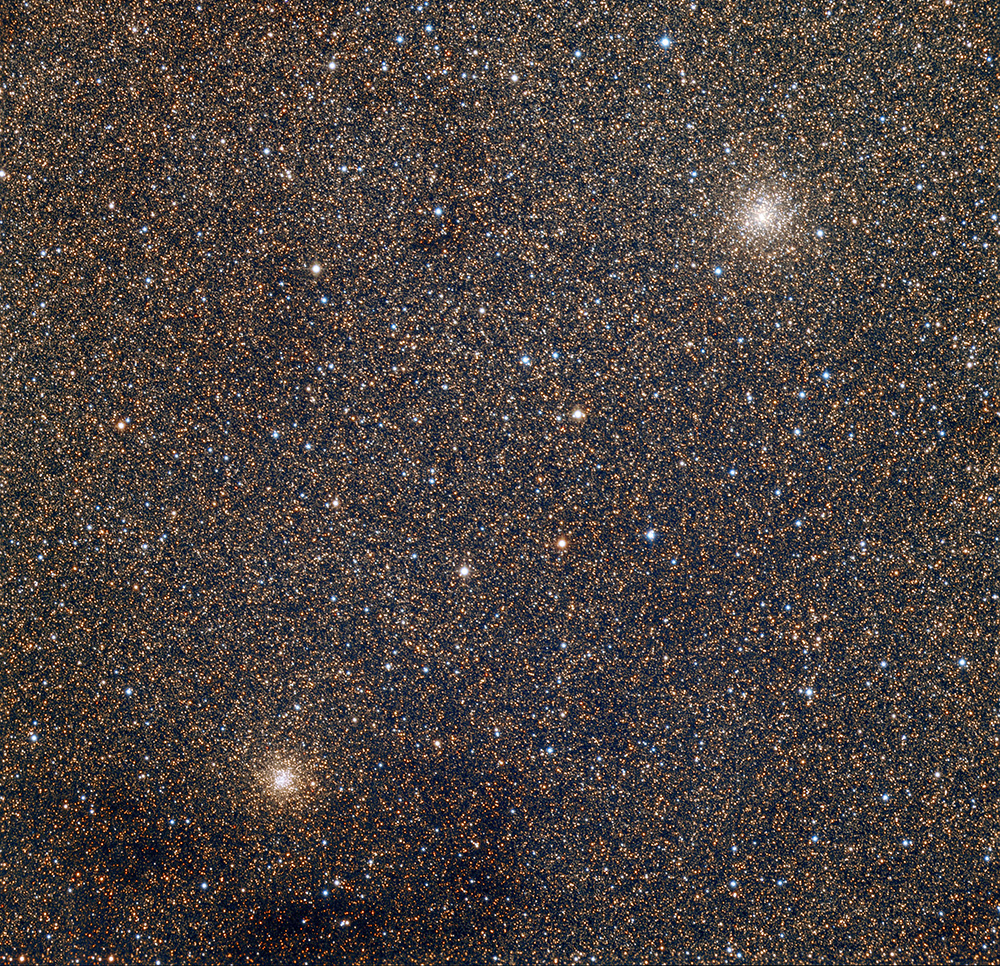
The globular cluster NGC 6528 (lower left) is close to NGC 6522 (upper right)
