= Small Sagittarius Star Cloud =

Star cloud in Sagittarius

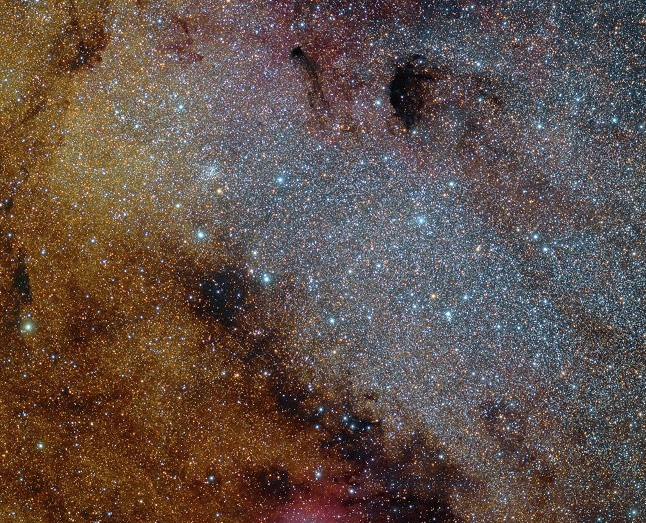
- Small Sagittarius Star Cloud (Messier 24) with open cluster NGC 6603 towards upper left

Observation data (J2000 epoch)
- Right ascension: 18^{h} 17^{m}
- Declination: −18° 29′
- Distance: ~10 kly (3070 pc)
- Apparent magnitude (V): 2.5
- Apparent dimensions (V): 2°x1°

Physical characteristics
- Radius: ~300 ly
- Other designations: Delle Caustiche, IC 4715

Associations
- Constellation: Sagittarius

The Small Sagittarius Star Cloud (also known as Messier 24 and IC 4715) is a star cloud in the constellation of Sagittarius approximately 600 light years wide, which was catalogued by Charles Messier in 1764. It should not be confused with the nearby Large Sagittarius Star Cloud which lies about 10° to the south.

Messier described the cloud as "a large nebulosity in which there are many stars of different magnitudes" and gave its dimensions as being some 1.5° across. Some sources, improperly, identify M24 as the small open cluster NGC 6603. The location of the Small Sagittarius Star Cloud is near the Omega Nebula (also known as M17) and open cluster Messier 18, both north of M24.

Messier 24 is not a distinct deep-sky object, rather an open window through the Great Rift into deeper regions of the Milky Way galaxy. It fills a space of significant volume to a depth of 10,000 to 15,000 light years away, including stars from the Scutum-Centaurus Arm, the major spiral arm between Earth and the Galactic Center. The star cloud is the most dense concentration of individual stars visible using binoculars, with around 1,000 stars visible within a single field of view. In telescopes it is best seen at low magnification, with a field of view of at least 2 degrees. Described as "a virtual carpet of stellar jewels", M24 is visible to the naked eye whenever the Milky Way itself is visible as well.

The light of M24 is spread out over a large area, which makes estimating its brightness difficult. Older references give the star cloud's magnitude as 4.6, but more recent estimates place it a full two magnitudes brighter, at 2.5.

HD 167356 is the brightest star within the Small Sagittarius Star Cloud, a white supergiant with an apparent magnitude of 6.05. This star is an Alpha-2 Canum Venaticorum variable, showing small changes in brightness as it rotates. There are three other stars in M24 with visual magnitudes between 6.5 and 7.0.

The star cloud incorporates two prominent dark nebulae which are vast clouds of dense, obscuring interstellar dust. This dust blocks light from the more distant stars, which keeps them from being seen from Earth. Lying on the northwestern side is Barnard 92, which is the darker of the two. Within the star field, the nebula appears as an immense round hole devoid of stars. American astronomer Edward Emerson Barnard discovered this dark nebula in 1913. Along the northeast side lies Barnard 93, as large as Barnard 92 though less obvious. There are also other dark nebulae within M24, including Barnard 304 and Barnard 307.

The Small Sagittarius Star Cloud also contains two planetary nebulae, M 1-43 and NGC 6567. Messier 24 holds some similarities with NGC 206, a bright, large star cloud within the Andromeda Galaxy.

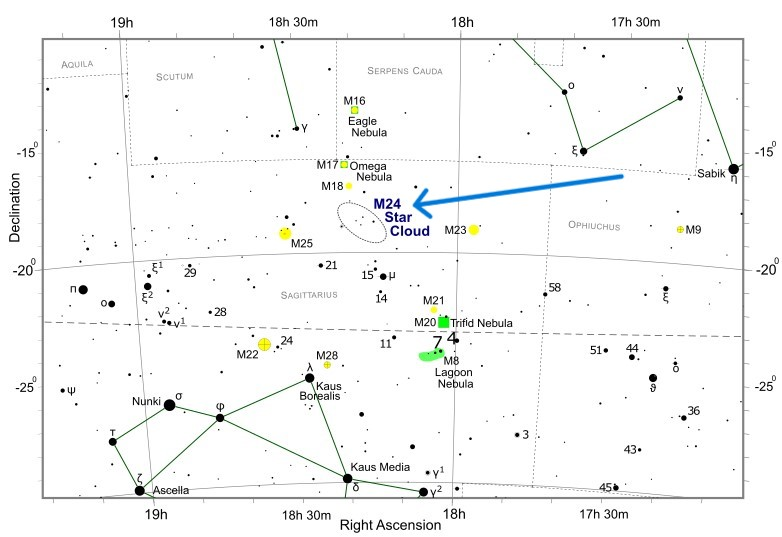

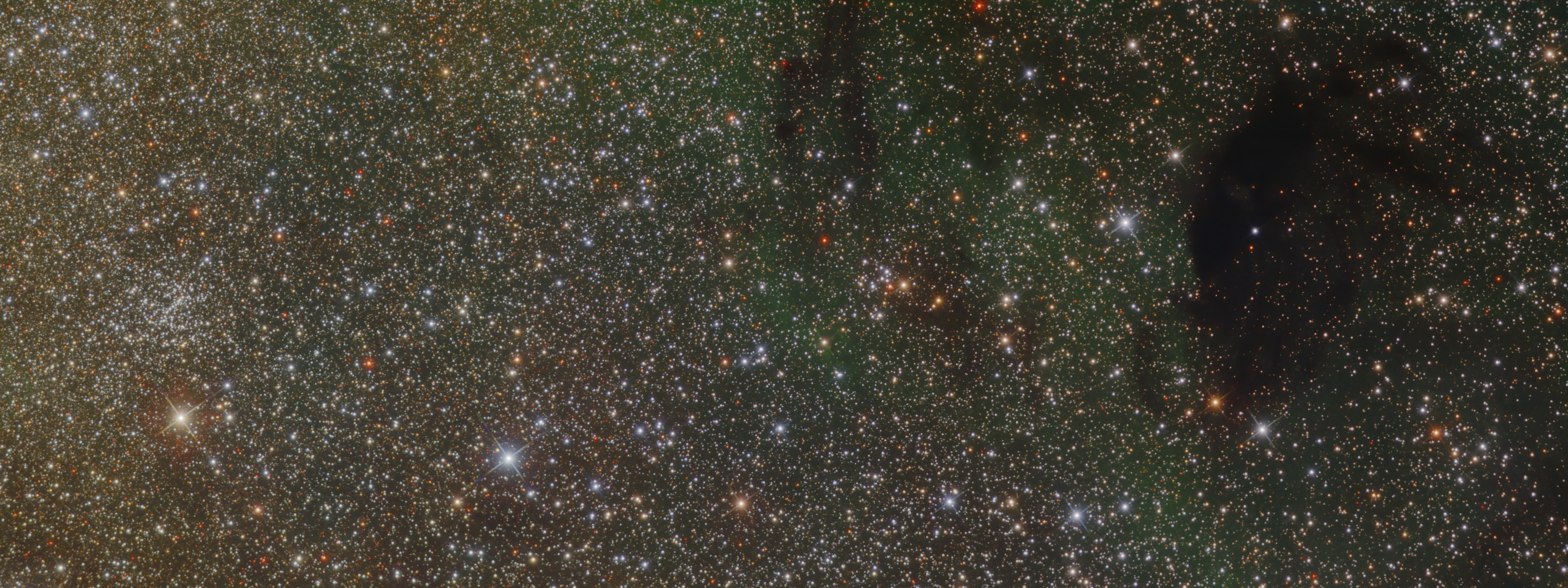
A false color panorama of various objects in M24: the open cluster NGC 6603, the dark nebula Barnard 92, and the H-II region Sharpless 41 (green glow on the right). Near infrared, red, and green light are mapped to the red, green, and blue channels of this image.

== See also ==
- Messier object
- List of Messier objects
- New General Catalogue
- Large Sagittarius Star Cloud
