= NGC 6522 =

Globular cluster in the constellation of Sagittarius

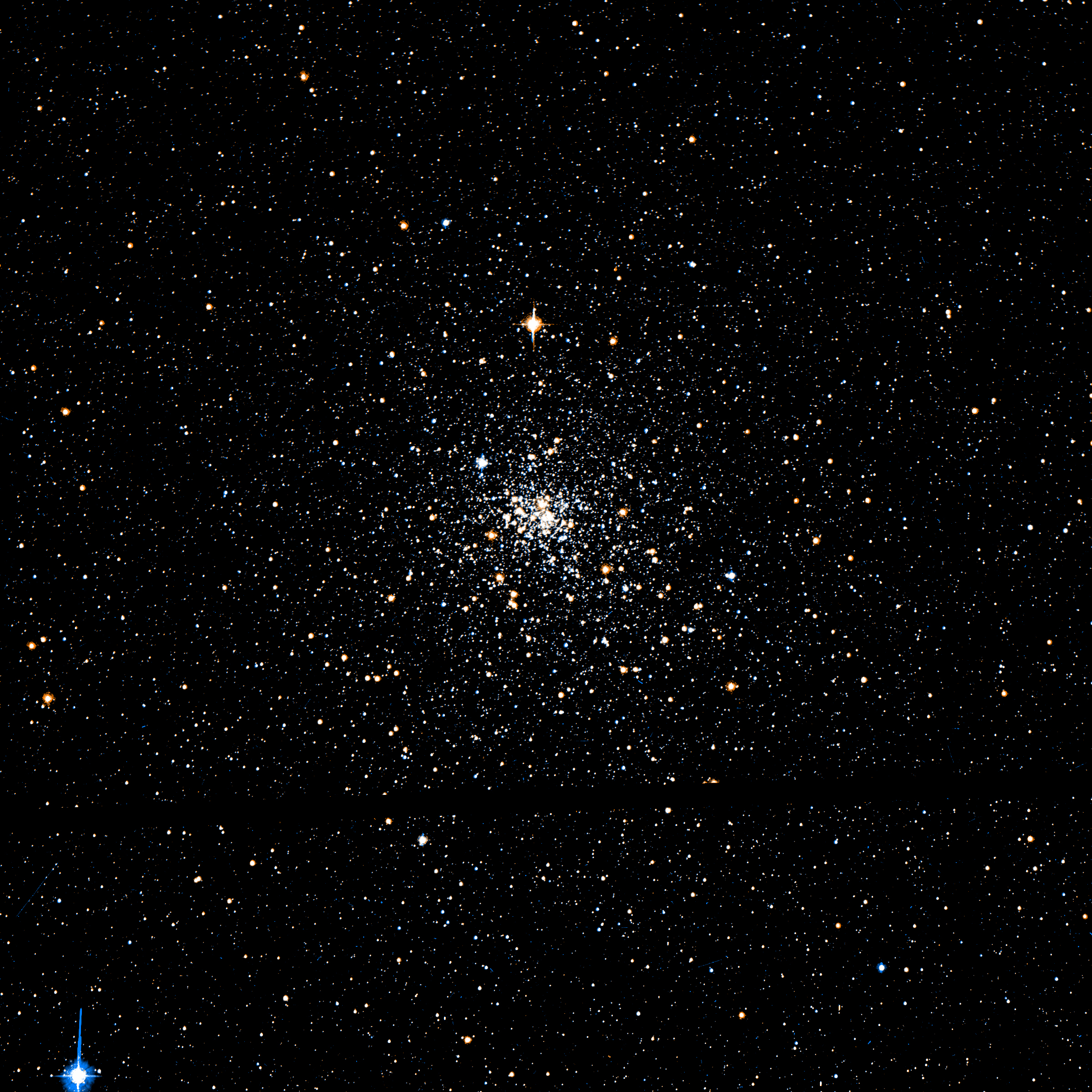

Observation data (J2000 epoch)
- Class: VI
- Constellation: Sagittarius
- Right ascension: 18^{h} 03^{m} 34.08^{s}
- Declination: −30° 02′ 02.3″
- Distance: 25.1 kly (7.7 kpc)
- Apparent magnitude (V): 8.3
- Apparent dimensions (V): 9.4′

Physical characteristics
- Absolute magnitude: −7.67
- Mass: 5.93×10^{4} M_{☉}
- Metallicity: [Fe/H] = –1.34 dex
- Estimated age: 12.0 Gyr
- Other designations: GCl 82, C 1800-300

NGC 6522 is a globular cluster of stars in the southern constellation of Sagittarius. It was discovered by German-British astronomer William Herschel on June 24, 1784. The cluster has an apparent visual magnitude of 8.3 and an angular diameter of 9.4′. It is located at a distance of 25.1 kly (7.7 kpc) from the Sun, and lies in the Milky Way's central bulge, about 2.0 kly (0.6 kpc) from the Galactic Center. The cluster is centered in a region of the sky known as Baade's Window. It is highly impacted by reddening due to interstellar dust and the view is heavily contaminated by field stars, making it more difficult to identify members.

NGC 6522 is possibly the oldest star cluster in the Milky Way, with an age of more than 12 billion years. It is a core collapsed cluster with a core radius of 0.5′ and a 1.0′ half-light radius. The cluster formed four billion years before the Milky Way galactic bar appeared, and may have been confined to the bar for a period of time. At present it trails the bar in its orbit around the core.

This is a low mass globular cluster with an estimated 5.93×10^{4} times the mass of the Sun. Distinctive chemical abundances among the members indicate the cluster has multiple populations of stars, with the younger populations exhibiting pollution from earlier generations. Twenty variable stars have been identified as members of NGC 6522, consisting of eight RR Lyrae, three type II Cepheids, and nine long-period variable stars. Six pulsars have been discovered.

== Gallery ==
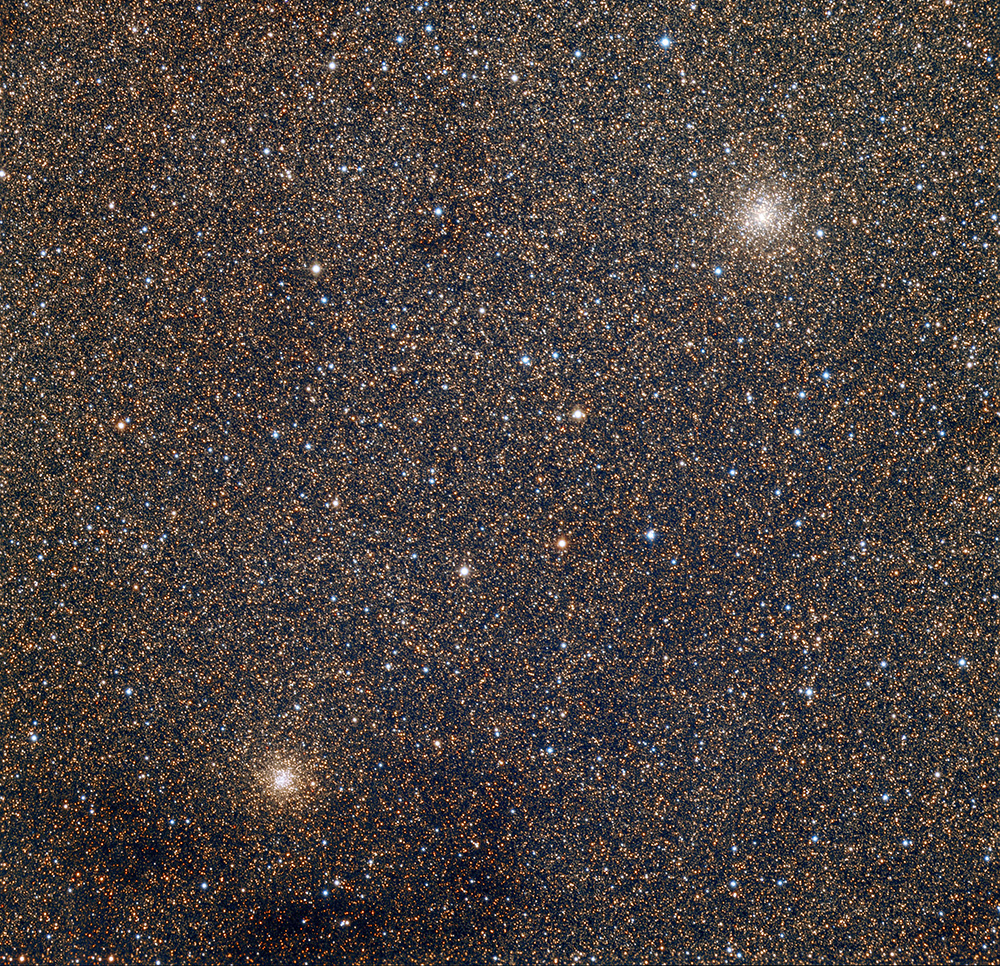
The globular clusters NGC 6528 (lower left) is close to NGC 6522 (upper right)

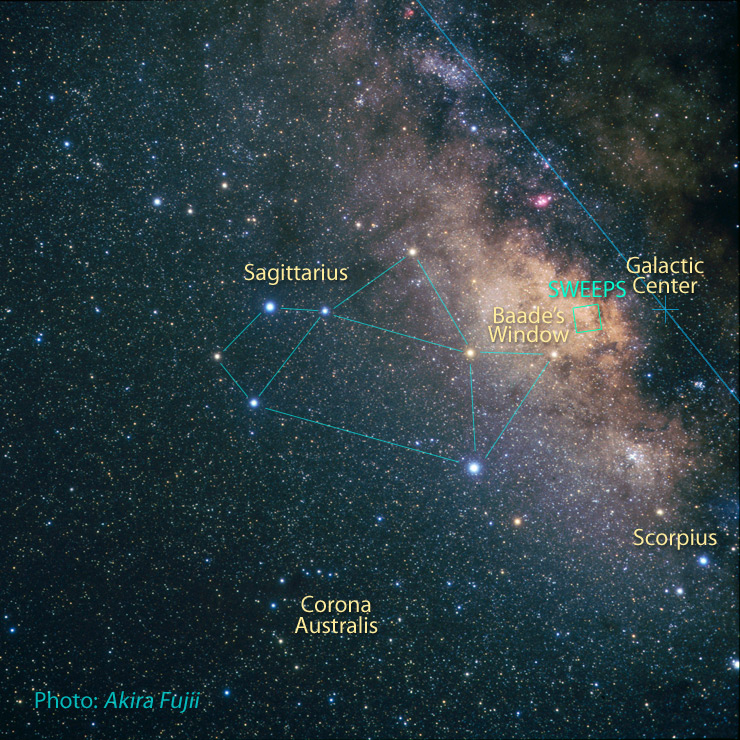
The cluster is located in Baade's Window, a region of night sky that is not clouded by dust from the Milky Way.
