= Boötes II =

Dwarf spheroidal galaxy in the constellation Boötes

Boötes II Dwarf Galaxy

Observation data (J2000 epoch)
- Constellation: Boötes
- Right ascension: 13^{h} 58^{m} 00^{s}
- Declination: +12° 51′ 00″
- Heliocentric radial velocity: −126 km/s
- Distance: 136 ± 7 kly (42 ± 2 kpc)
- Apparent magnitude (V): 15.8 ± 0.5

Characteristics
- Type: dSph
- Apparent size (V): 8.0^{+2.2}_{−2.8}′

Other designations
- Boo II, PGC 4713552

Boötes II or Boo II is a dwarf spheroidal galaxy situated in the constellation Boötes and discovered in 2007 in the data obtained by Sloan Digital Sky Survey. The galaxy is located at the distance of about 42 kpc from the Sun and moves towards the Sun with the speed of 126 km/s. It is classified as a dwarf spheroidal galaxy (dSph) meaning that it has an approximately round shape with the half-light radius of about 51 pc. (Note: Other sources give the half-light radius of about 36 pc.)

Boötes II is one of the smallest and faintest satellites (Note: Only Segue 1, Segue 2 and Willman 1 are fainter.) of the Milky Way—its integrated luminosity is about 1,000 times that of the Sun (absolute visible magnitude of about −2.7), which is much lower than the luminosity of the majority of globular clusters. However the mass of the galaxy is substantial corresponding to the mass to light ratio of more than 100.

The stellar population of Boötes II consists mainly of moderately old stars formed 10–12 billion years ago. The metallicity of these old stars is low at [Fe/H]=−2.3, which means that they contain 200 times less heavy elements than the Sun. Currently there is no star formation in Boötes II. The measurements have so far failed to detect any neutral hydrogen in it—the upper limit is only 86 solar masses.

Boötes II is located only 1.5 degrees (~1.6 kpc) away from another dwarf galaxy—Boötes I, although they are unlikely to be physically associated because they move in opposite directions relative to the Milky Way. Their relative velocity—about 200 km/s is too high. It is more likely associated with the Sagittarius Stream and, therefore, with the Sagittarius Dwarf Elliptical Galaxy (SagDEG). Boötes II may be either a satellite galaxy of SagDEG or one of its star clusters torn from the main galaxy 4–7 billion years ago.
