= Westerhout 40 =

Star-forming region in the constellation Serpens

W 40
Nebula
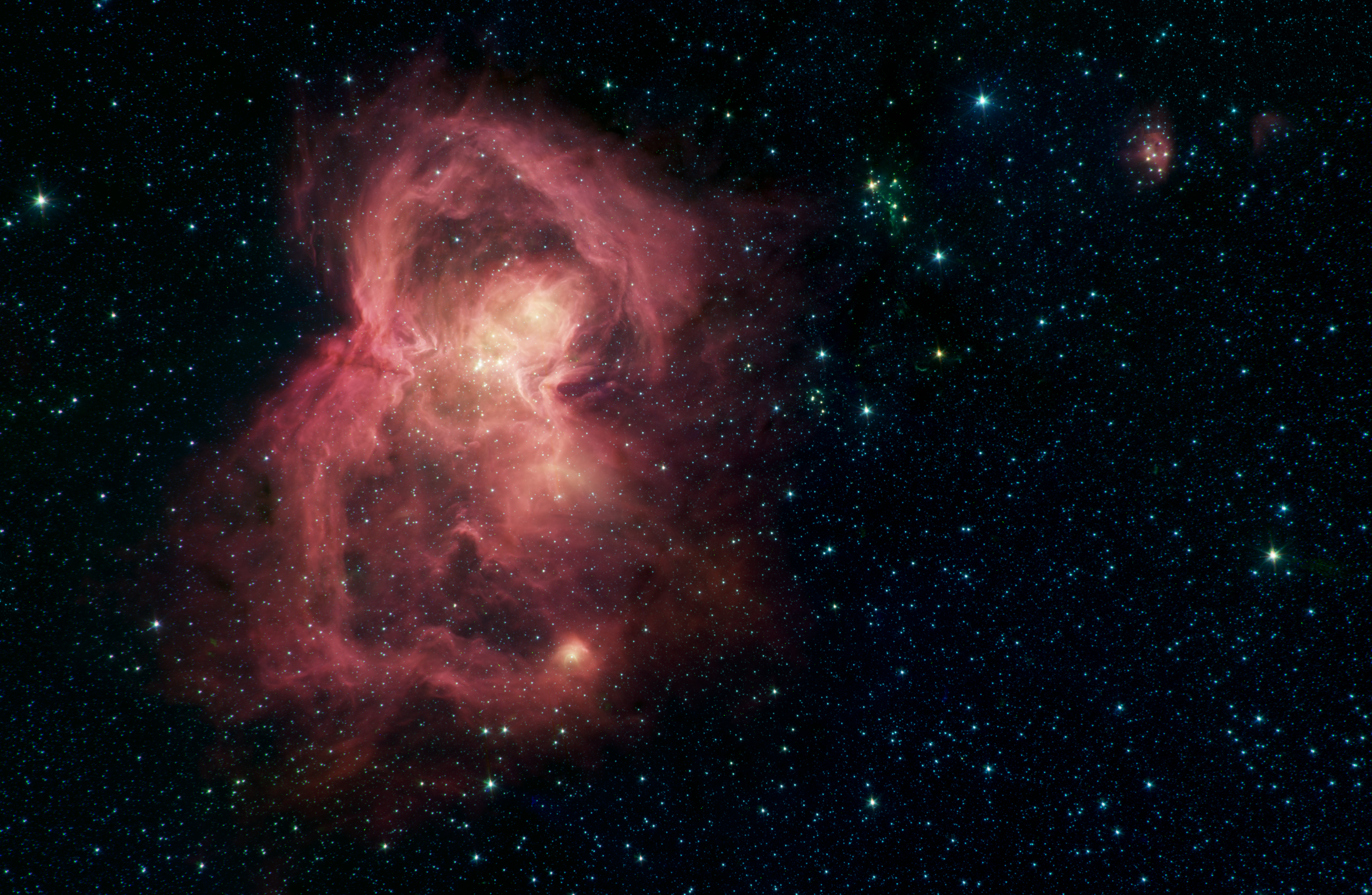
- W40 as seen in the infrared by the Spitzer Space Telescope.

Observation data: J2000 epoch
- Class: H II region
- Right ascension: 18^{h} 31^{m} 29^{s}
- Declination: −02° 05.4′
- Distance: 1420 ± 30 ly (436 ± 9 pc)
- Apparent dimensions (V): 8 arcminutes
- Constellation: Serpens Cauda

Physical characteristics
- Radius: 1.65 ly
- Designations: W40, Sh2-64, RCW 174, LBN 90

Westerhout 40 or W40 (also designated Sharpless 64, Sh2-64, or RCW 174) is a star-forming region in the Milky Way located in the constellation Serpens. In this region, interstellar gas forming a diffuse nebula surrounds a cluster of several hundred new-born stars. The distance to W40 is 436 ± 9 pc (1420 ± 30 light years), making it one of the closest sites of formation of high-mass O-type and B-type stars. The ionizing radiation from the massive OB stars has created an H II region, which has an hour-glass morphology.

Dust from the molecular cloud in which W40 formed obscures the nebula, rendering W40 difficult to observe at visible wavelengths of light. Thus, X-ray, infrared, and radio observations have been used to see through the molecular cloud to study the star-formation processes going on within.

W40 appears near to several other star-forming regions in the sky, including an infrared dark cloud designated Serpens South and a young stellar cluster designated the Serpens Main Cluster. Similar distances measured for these three star-forming regions suggests that they are near to each other and part of the same larger-scale collection of clouds known as the Serpens Molecular Cloud.

== On the Sky ==
The W40 star-forming region is projected on the sky in the direction of the Serpens-Aquila Rift, a mass of dark clouds above the Galactic plane in the constellations Aquila, Serpens, and eastern Ophiuchus. The high extinction from interstellar clouds means that the nebula looks unimpressive in visible light, despite being one of the nearest sites of massive star formation.

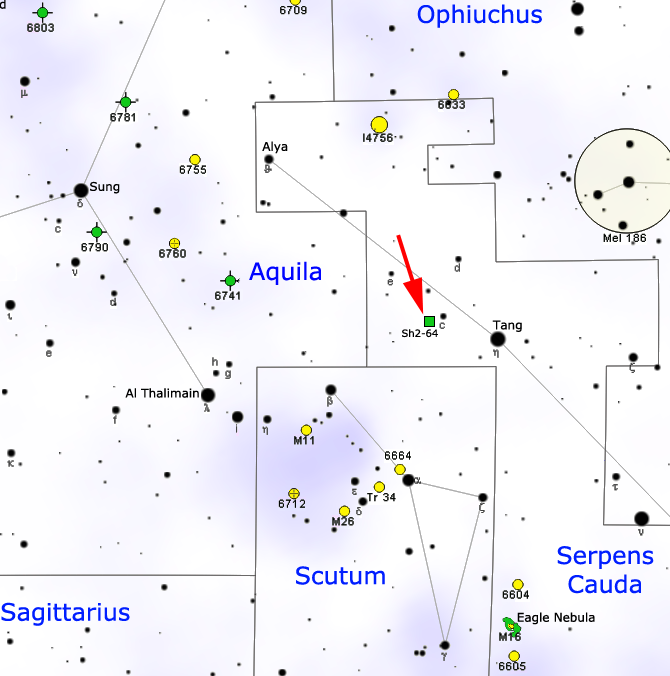
Location of W 40 on the sky

== Star Formation in W40 ==
Like all star-forming regions, W40 is made up of several components: the cluster of young stars and the gaseous material from which these stars form (the interstellar medium). Most of the gas in W40 is in the form of molecular clouds, the coldest, densest phase of the interstellar medium, which is made up of mostly molecular hydrogen (H_{2}). Stars form in molecular clouds when the gas mass in part of a cloud becomes too great, causing it to collapse due to the Jeans instability. Stars usually do not form in isolation, but rather in groups containing hundreds or thousands of other stars, as is the case of W40.

In W40, feedback from the star cluster has ionized some of the gas and blown a bipolar bubble in the cloud around the cluster. Such feedback effects may trigger further star-formation but can also lead to the eventual destruction of the molecular cloud and an end of star-formation activity.

== Star cluster ==
A cluster of young stars lies at the center of the W40 HII region containing approximately 520 stars down to 0.1 solar masses (M_{☉}). Age estimates for the stars indicate that the stars in the center of the cluster are approximately 0.8 million years old, while the stars on the outside are slightly older at 1.5 million years. The cluster is roughly spherically symmetric and is mass segregated, with the more massive stars relatively more likely to be found near the center of the cluster. The cause of mass segregation in very young star clusters, like W40, is an open theoretical question in star-formation theory because timescales for mass segregation through two-body interactions between stars are typically too long.

The cloud is ionized by several O and B-type stars. Near-infrared spectroscopy has identified one late-O type star named IRS 1A South, and 3 early B-type stars, IRS 2B, IRS 3A, and IRS 5. In addition, IRS 1A North and IRS 2A are Herbig Ae/Be stars. Radio emission from several of these stars is observed with the Very Large Array, and may be evidence for ultra-compact H II regions.

Excess light in the infrared indicates that a number of stars in the cluster have circumstellar disks, which may be in the process of forming planets. Millimeter observations from the IRAM 30m telescope show 9 Class-0 protostars in the Serpens South region and 3 Class-0 protostars in W40, supporting the view that the region is very young and actively forming stars.

== Interstellar medium ==
W40 lies in a molecular cloud with an estimated mass of 10^{4} M_{☉}. The core of the molecular cloud has a shape like a shepherd's crook and is currently producing new stars. The cluster of OB and pre–main-sequence (PMS) stars lies just eastward of the bend in this filament. The cloud core was also observed in radio light produced by CO, which allows the mass of the core to be estimated at 200–300 M_{☉}. A weak, bipolar outflow of gas flows out of the core, likely driven by a young stellar object, with two lobes differing in velocity by 0.5 km/s.

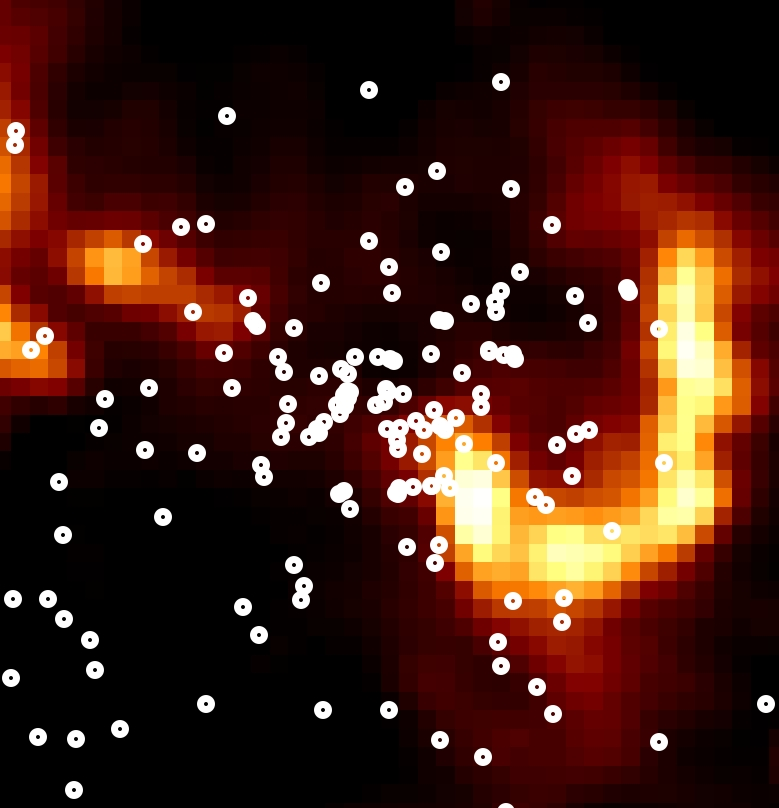
View of the core of the molecular cloud as seen by Herschel/SPIRE at 500 μm. Overlaid (white circles) are young stars detected by the Chandra X-ray Observatory.

It was in this region where the striking prevalence of filamentary cloud structures seen by ESA's Herschel Space Observatory was first noted. These filaments of cloud have dense "cores" of gas embedded within them—many of which are likely to gravitationally collapse and form stars. The Herschel results for this region, and subsequently reported results for other star-forming regions, imply that fragmentation of molecular-cloud filaments are fundamental to the star-formation process. The Herschel results for W40 and the Aquila Rift, compared to those for molecular clouds in the Polaris region, suggest that star-formation occurs when the linear density (mass per unit length) exceeds a threshold making them susceptible to gravitational instability. This accounts for the high star-formation rate in W40 and the Aquila Rift, in contrast to the low star-formation rate in the Polaris clouds. These observational results complement computer simulations of star-formation, which also emphasize the role that molecular-cloud filaments play in the birth of stars.

Observations by the space-based Chandra X-ray Observatory have shown a diffuse X-ray glow from the H II region, which is likely due to the presence of a multi-million Kelvin plasma. Such hot plasmas can be produced by winds from massive stars, which become shock heated.

== Gallery ==
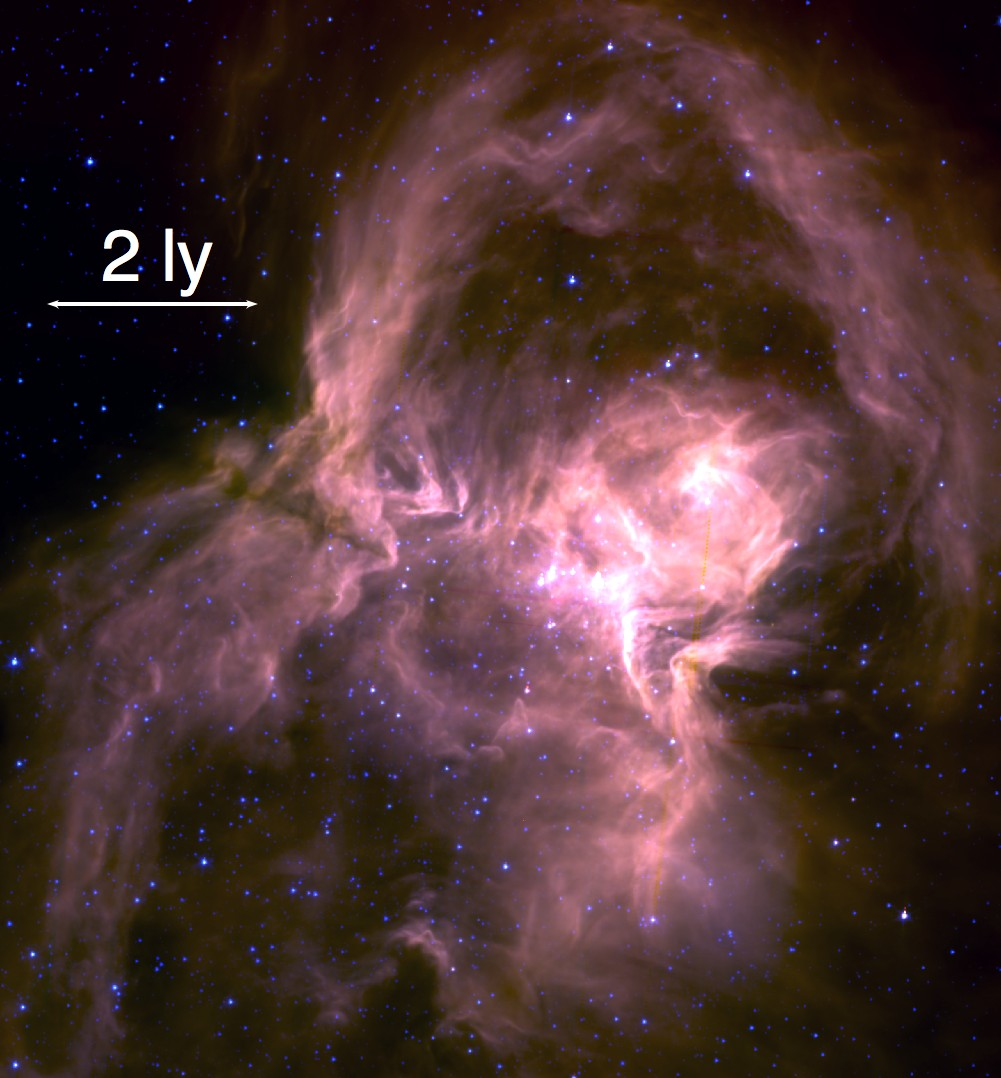
Spitzer Space Telescope mosaic image of W40.

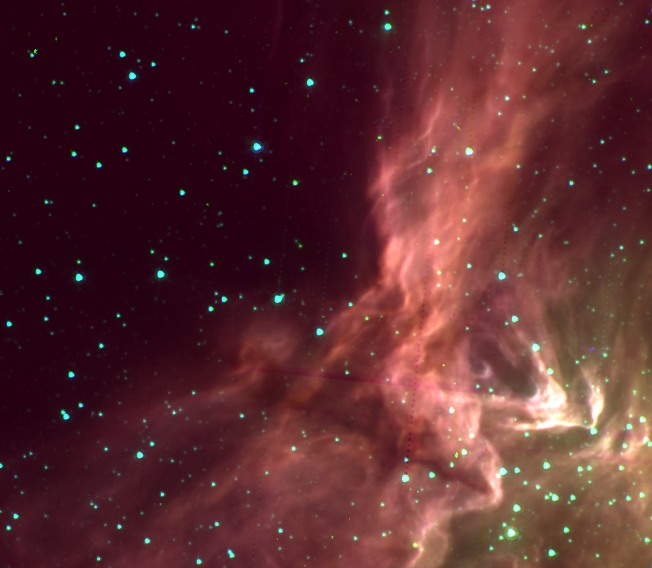
A close-up of an IRDC in the Spitzer image.

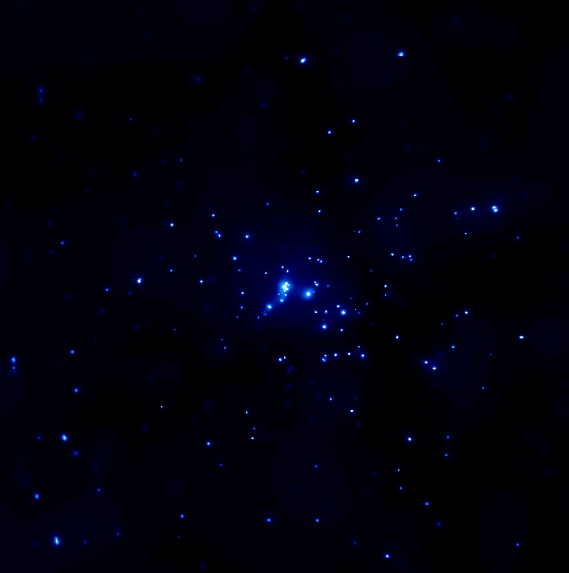
The W40 cluster in the X-ray.

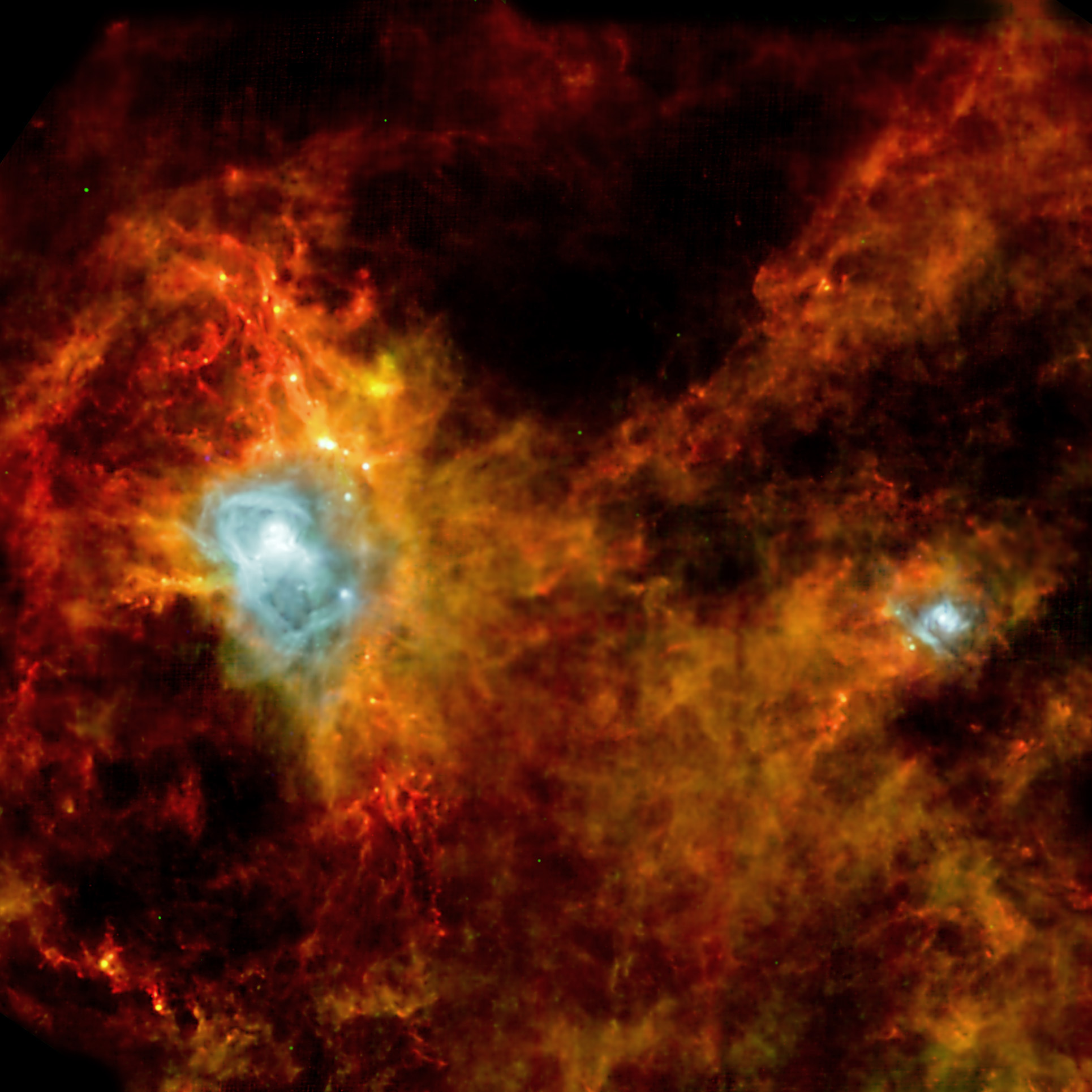
W40 and its environs seen by Herschel.

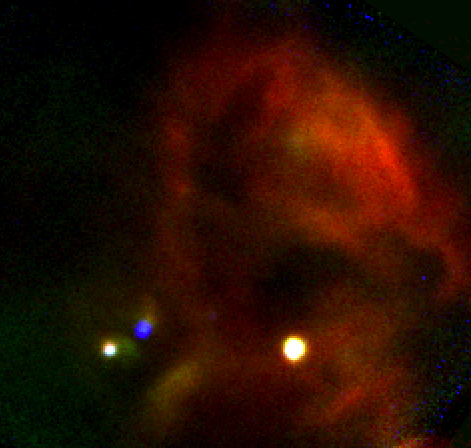
SOFIA view of the center of W40.

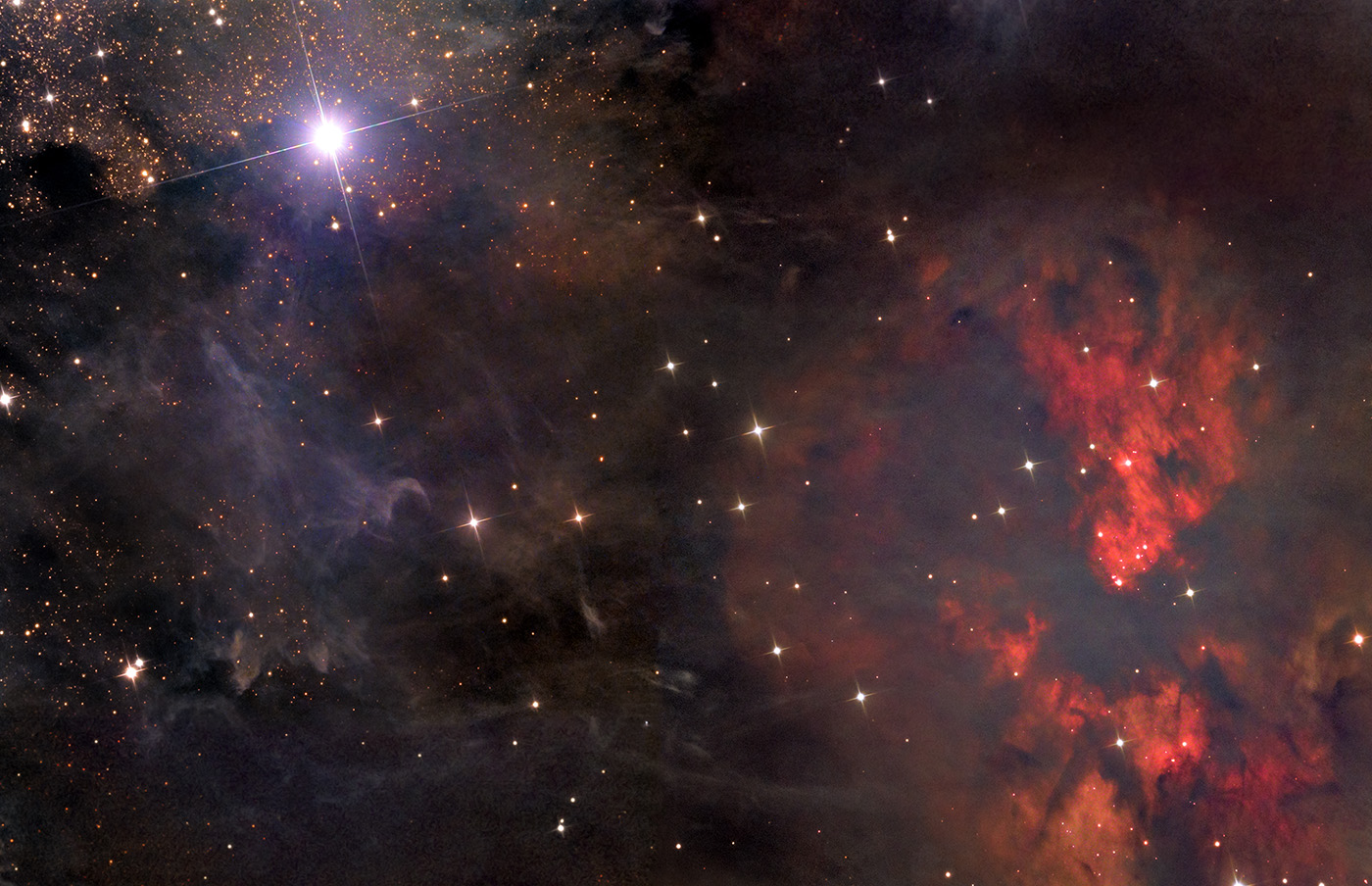
An optical image of W40 from Mount Lemmon SkyCenter.

== See also ==
- RCW Catalog
- List of Star-Forming Regions in the Local Group
