= Beth Willman =

American astronomer

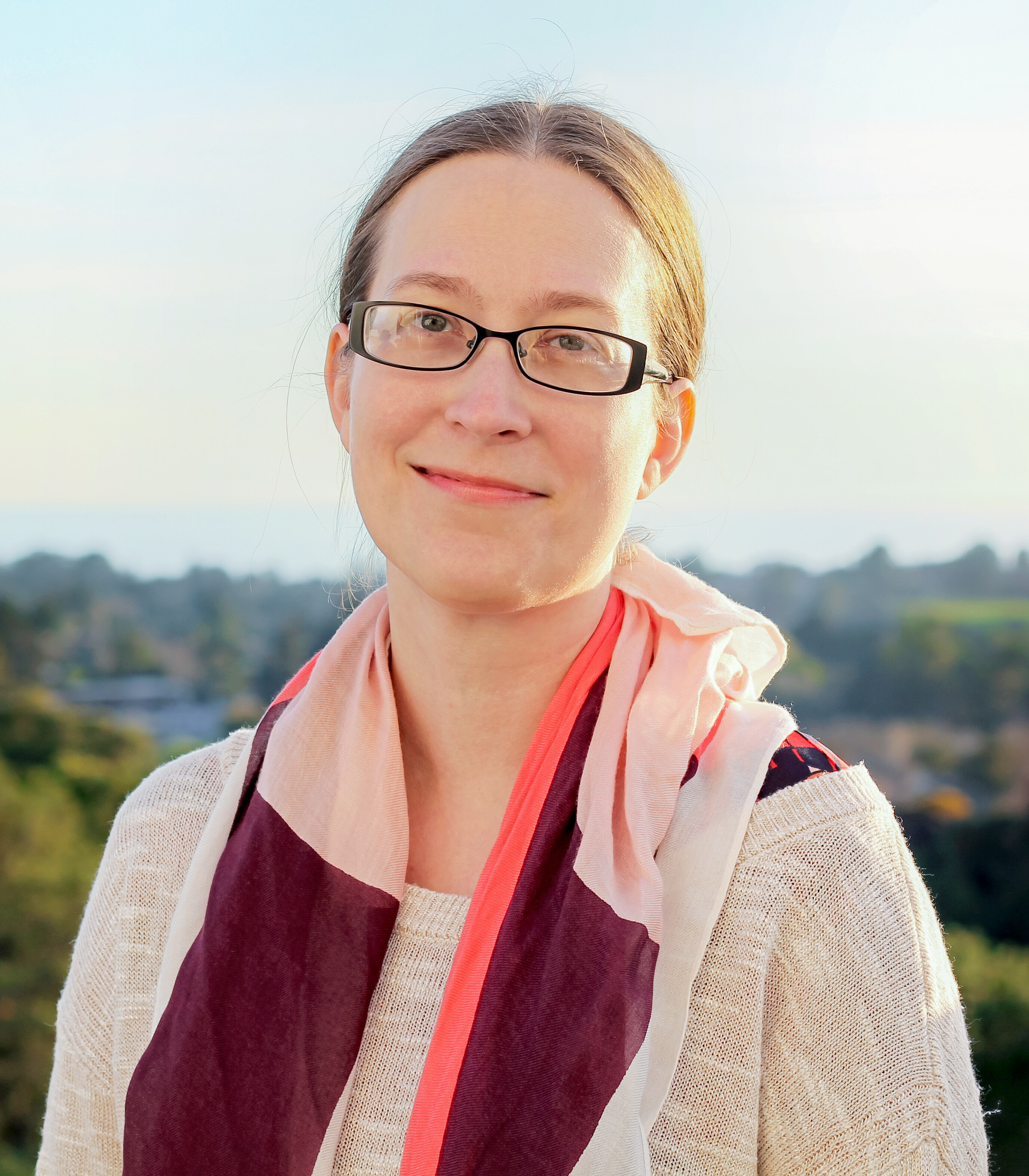
- Willman in 2021
- Education: Columbia University (B.A.); University of Washington (Ph.D.)
- Scientific career
- Fields: Astronomy
- Workplaces: Harvard–Smithsonian Center for Astrophysics; Haverford College; NOIRLab; LSST Corporation
- Thesis: A Survey for Resolved Milky Way Dwarf Galaxy Satellites (2003)
- Doctoral advisor: Julianne Dalcanton

Beth Willman is an American astronomer who is the chief executive officer of the LSST Discovery Alliance, an astronomical organization notable for its support of the Vera C. Rubin Observatory. She was previously the deputy director of the National Optical-Infrared Astronomy Research Laboratory (NOIRLab) and an associate professor of astronomy at Haverford College.

== Education ==
Beth Willman received her B.A. in astrophysics at Columbia University. In 2003 she received a Ph.D. in astronomy from the University of Washington. Her doctoral advisor was Julianne Dalcanton and her thesis was on Milky Way dwarf satellite galaxies. Beth Willman has also been a James Arthur Fellow at New York University's Center for Cosmology and Particle Physics, and a Clay Fellow at the Center for Astrophysics | Harvard & Smithsonian.

== Research ==
Willman mainly focuses her research on cosmology. Her specialty is investigating the least luminous galaxies in our known Universe. The galaxy Willman 1, which she discovered during her postdoc, is named after her.
