= W40 IRS 1A South =

Star in the constellation Serpens

Observation data Epoch J2000 Equinox J2000
- Constellation: Serpens
- Right ascension: 18^{h} 31^{m} 27.827^{s}
- Declination: −02° 05′ 22.86″
- Apparent magnitude (V): 15

Characteristics
- Evolutionary stage: O-type main-sequence star
- Spectral type: O9.5

Astrometry
Distance	436 pc

Details
Radius	7.71 R_{☉}
Luminosity	52,500 L_{☉}
Temperature	31,500 K

Other designations
- (W40 IRS 1A:) CXOW40 J183127.84-020523.5, 2MASS J18312782-0205228

Database references
SIMBAD	(IRS 1a) data

W40 IRS 1A South is a young O-type star in the H II region, Westerhout 40, one of the closest O type stars to the Sun at just over 1,400 light years away. It is the only known O-type star in W40 and is responsible for most of W40's ionisation, and its stellar wind has carved out a 4 pc wide bubble around it, which can be seen in wide field mid-IR images. W40 IRS 1A South is separated from its northern counterpart, W40 IRS 1A North, which is a heavily reddened Herbig Be star, by approximately 2".

== Properties ==
Not much is known about IRS 1A South, given how reddened and extinguished it is (by 10.6 magnitudes, which is why it is so dim despite being such a massive star so close to us, i.e. only 0.0058% of its light reaches us). So far attempts to derive its parameters have used averages from its spectral type of O9.5 (V), and different models have given different parameters. The most recent temperature value for IRS 1A South is 31,500 Kelvin, and the most recent radius value is 7.71 solar radii. Considering these parameters and the Stefan–Boltzmann law derives a luminosity of about 52,500 solar luminosities. Assuming the distance of 436 parsecs, the apparent magnitude of about 15 and the extinction of 10.6 magnitudes, IRS 1A South has an absolute magnitude of -4.25, i.e. it's about 4,300 times brighter than the Sun in the visible wavelength.
