= Willman 1 =

Ultra-faint dwarf galaxy

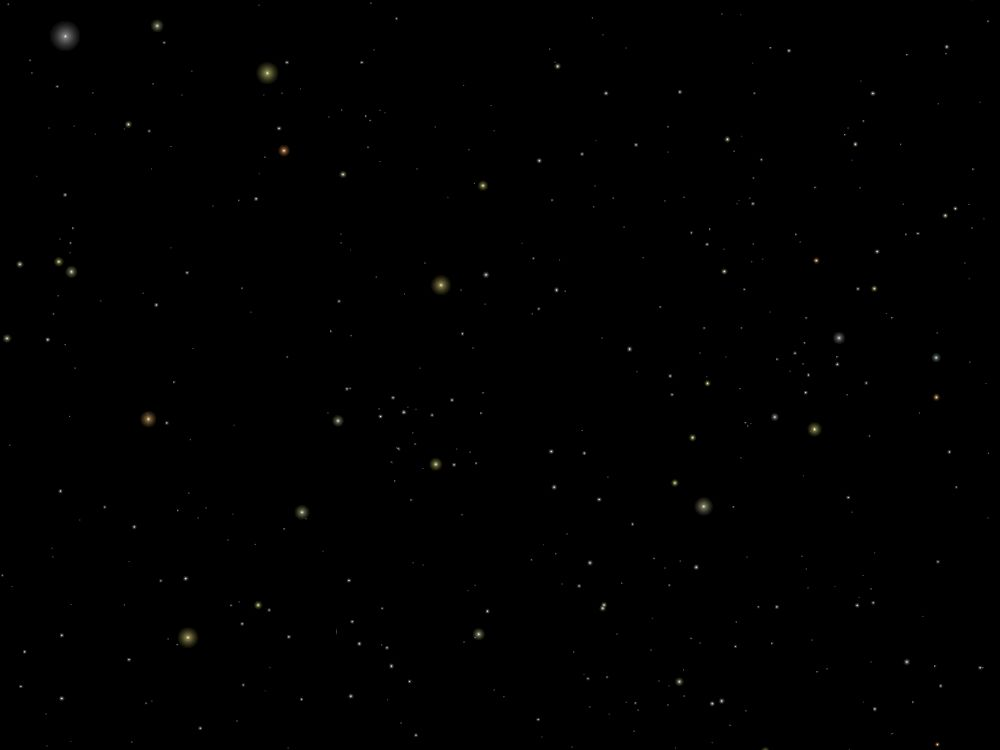

Observation data (J2000 epoch)
- Constellation: Ursa Major
- Right ascension: 10^{h} 49^{m} 22.5^{s}
- Declination: +51° 03′ 00.4″
- Heliocentric radial velocity: -13.0 ± 1.1 km/s
- Distance: 126 ± 2 kly (38.55 ± 0.45 kpc)
- Apparent magnitude (V): 15.4 ± 0.7 mag
- Absolute magnitude (V): -2.56 ± 0.74 mag

Characteristics
- Type: ultra-faint dwarf galaxy
- Mass: 5.9^{+3.7}_{−3.4}×10^{5} M_{☉}
- Mass/Light ratio: 660 ± 590 M_{☉}/L_{☉}
- Half-light radius (physical): 26.8 ± 3.2 pc
- Half-light radius (apparent): 2.51 ± 0.22 arcmin

Other designations
- SDSS J1049+5103

Willman 1 is an ultra-faint dwarf galaxy discovered in 2005. It is named after Beth Willman of Haverford College who first identified it as an over-density of stars in the Sloan Digital Sky Survey (SDSS). The object is a satellite galaxy of the Milky Way and is located approximately 39 kiloparsecs (130,000 light-years) from Earth. Besides the Magellanic Clouds, it is the only other Milky Way dwarf galaxy named after a person and the only Milky Way dwarf galaxy named after a woman. Willman 1 was the lowest luminosity galaxy known at the time of discovery with an absolute magnitude of -2.5.

== Discovery & History of Observations ==
Initially known as SDSS J1049+5103, Beth Willman and collaborators discovered Willman 1 in the 2nd data release of the Sloan Digital Sky Survey. At the time, it was unclear whether Willman 1 was a globular cluster or a very faint dwarf spheroid galaxy.

Combining spectroscopy from the W. M. Keck Observatory with imaging from the Kitt Peak National Observatory, they reported the presence of stellar multi-directional tails, suggesting possible tidal interactions with the Milky Way. Despite tentative evidence for mass segregation, a feature only observed in globular clusters, they leaned towards a dwarf galaxy classification based on a metallicity spread from three red giant branch stars. This metallicity spread indicates multiple epochs of star formation because stars with different metal abundances, or metallicities, must have formed at different times. These successive generations of stars enrich the surrounding gas with heavier elements leading to an observed spread in metallicity for stars in the object. This extended chemical evolution is a property of galaxies but not globular clusters because the dark matter in galaxies allows them to retain gas as a long-term reservoir for continued star formation.

Further spectroscopy in 2007 on the Keck Telescope identified seven red giant branch members, also with a significant metallicity spread. However, follow-up spectroscopy from the Hobby-Eberly Telescope in 2008 determined that up to five of these members were likely Milky Way foreground dwarf stars whose presence was inflating the metallicity spread.

In 2011, Beth Willman and collaborators re-analyzed spectroscopy from the Keck Telescope and carefully characterized Milky Way contaminates, identifying 45 member stars (although a later study showed that this includes four binaries and seven Milky Way stars). This sample contains an additional red giant branch member and two horizontal branch members whose metallicity spread was once again indicative of a dwarf galaxy. Photometry from the Hubble Space Telescope confirmed this spectroscopic metallicity spread and measured an updated distance to the object. These data also show evidence for an irregular kinematic distribution and a tentative excess of stars at large half-light radii that could point to a disturbed morphology.

In 2026, Marla Geha homogeneously re-reduced over 20 years of archival spectroscopy from the Keck Telescope for 78 Milky Way satellites, including Willman 1. From these new data, 56 member stars were identified and used to measure the kinematic and chemical properties of the object. Ultimately, Willman 1 was confirmed to be a dwarf galaxy on the basis of its velocity dispersion and inferred mass-to-light ratio, lack of mass segregation, and position on the size-luminosity relation. Additionally, Willman 1 was found to be likely tidally disrupted based on detailed orbital modeling. These models predict that Willman 1 has had a sustained passage near the Milky Way over the course of its orbit, when and where tidal forces from the Milky Way could have gravitationally disturbed its stars. This history could explain Willman 1’s elliptical shape and odd velocity distribution. As a result of this potential tidal stripping, it is cautioned that the dynamical mass inferred from the internal velocity dispersion may be inaccurate as the object is likely not in dynamical equilibrium.

== Properties ==
The stellar population of Willman 1 consists mainly of old stars formed more than 10 billion years ago. The metallicity of these stars is very metal-poor, with an average metallicity of -2.45^{+0.12}_{−0.13} and a metallicity dispersion of 0.30^{+0.15}_{−0.11} dex.

Willman 1 has a systemic velocity of -13.0 ± 1.1 km/s and a velocity dispersion of 4.7^{+1.5}_{−1.3} km/s. If Willman 1 is in dynamical equilibrium, this implies a dynamical mass of 5.9^{+3.7}_{−3.4}×10^{5} M_{☉} and a mass-to-light ratio of 660 ± 590. This high mass-to-light ratio implies that Willman 1 is dominated by dark matter. Due to this apparent high dark matter content and relatively close proximity, Willman 1 remains one of the most promising targets in the search for dark matter annihilation signals. However, given evidence for dynamical disequilibrium, its dynamical properties are likely misleading, and the object should be used with caution as a target for dark matter searches.

As of 2007, Willman 1 was declared the least massive galaxy known, opening up a new category of ultra-low-mass galaxies, lower than the then-theoretical minimum of 10 million solar masses thought to be needed to form a galaxy. It is over ten million times less luminous than the Milky Way. As seen from Earth, Willman 1's location is several arcseconds west of galaxies NGC 3406, NGC 3406, and NGC 3410.

Preceded by	Least massive galaxy known 2007 – 2013; 500,000M_{Sun}	Succeeded by Segue 2
