= Segue 2 =

Galaxy in the constellation Aries

Segue 2 Dwarf Galaxy

Observation data (J2000 epoch)
- Constellation: Aries
- Right ascension: 02^{h} 19^{m} 16^{s}
- Declination: +20° 10′ 31″
- Distance: 114 kly (35 kpc)
- Apparent magnitude (V): 15.2 ± 0.2

Characteristics
- Type: dSph
- Mass: 5.5×10^{5} M_{☉}
- Mass/Light ratio: 650 M_{☉}/L_{☉}
- Half-light radius (physical): 34 pc (110 ly)

Other designations
- Segue 2, PGC 4713565

Segue 2 is a dwarf spheroidal galaxy situated in the constellation Aries and discovered in 2009 in the data obtained by Sloan Digital Sky Survey. The galaxy is located in the Local Group, at the distance of about 35 kiloparsecs (35,000 parsecs; 110,000 light-years) from the Sun and moves towards the Sun at a speed of 40 kilometres per second (25 mi/s). It is classified as a dwarf spheroidal galaxy (dSph), meaning that it has an approximately round shape with a half-light radius of about 34 parsecs.

The name is was chosen because it was found by the SEGUE program, the Sloan Extension for Galactic Understanding and Exploration.

Segue 2 is one of the smallest and faintest satellites of the Milky Way—its integrated luminosity is about 800 times that of the Sun (absolute visible magnitude of about −2.5), which is much lower than the luminosity of the majority of globular clusters. However, the mass of the galaxy—about 550,000 solar masses—is substantial, corresponding to a mass-to-light ratio of about 650.

The stellar population of Segue 2 consists mainly of old stars formed more than 12 billion years ago. The metallicity of these old stars is also very low at [Fe/H] < −2, which means that they contain at least 100 times less heavy elements than the Sun. The stars of Segue 2 were probably among the first stars to form in the universe. Currently, there is no star formation in Segue 2.

Segue 2 is located near the edge of Sagittarius Stream and at the same distance. It may once have been a satellite of Sagittarius Dwarf Elliptical Galaxy or its star cluster.

Preceded by Willman 1	Least massive galaxy known 2013 – 550,000 M_{Sun}	Succeeded by current
