= Infrared dark cloud =

Cold, dense region of a giant molecular cloud

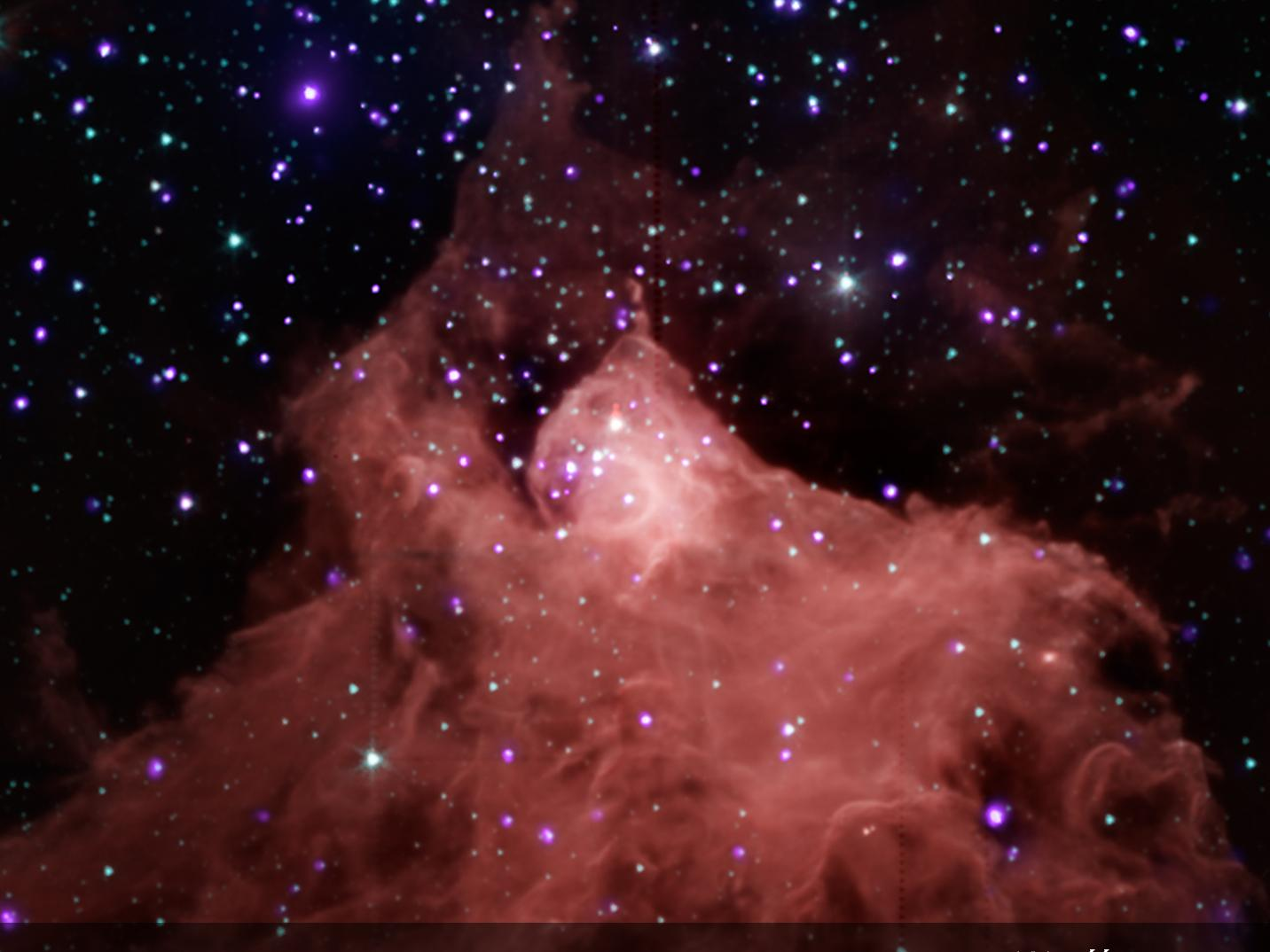
Composite image showing young stars in and around molecular cloud Cepheus B.

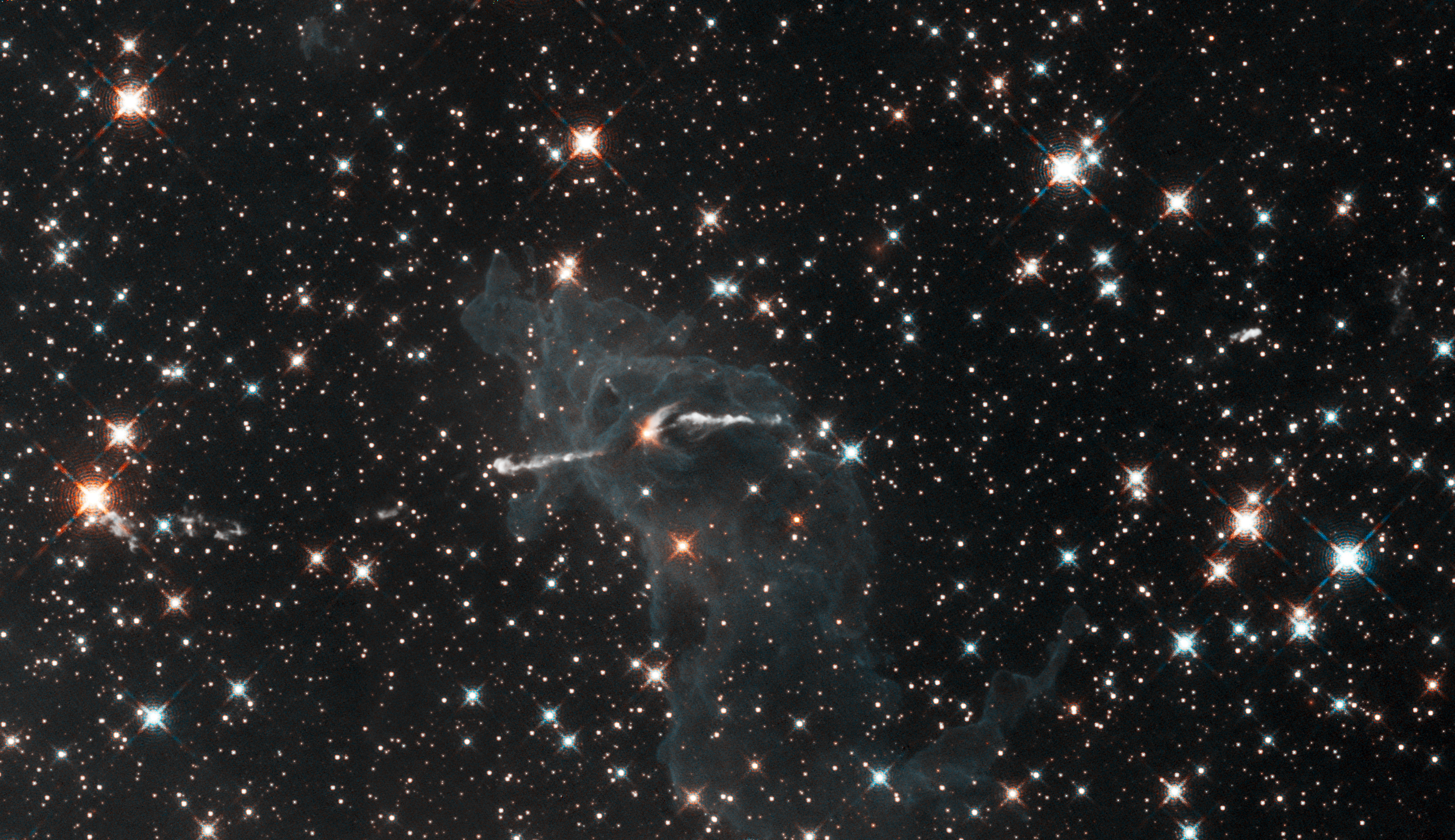
Infrared

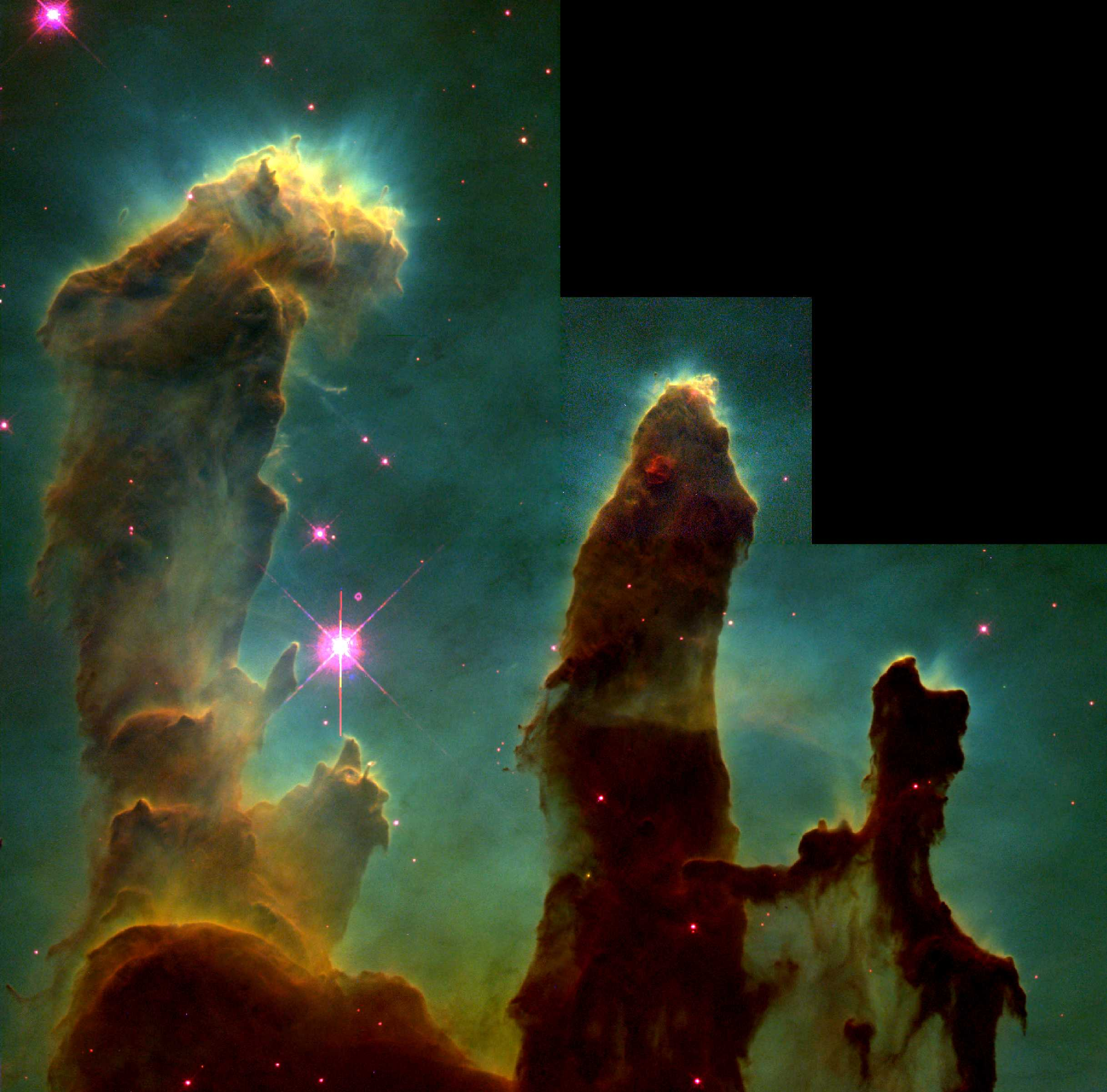
Star formation

An infrared dark cloud (IRDC) is a cold, dense region of a giant molecular cloud. They can be seen in silhouette against the bright diffuse mid-infrared emission from the galactic plane.

== Discovery ==
Infrared dark clouds have only been recently discovered in 1996 using the ISO and therefore are in need of further research. The Spitzer Space telescope, created by NASA to detect infrared radiation, assisted in the location and identification of infrared dark clouds. The highly sensitive telescope was used to analyze the Milky Way and create numerous astronomical surveys at wavelengths that allowed for the detailed analysis of IRDCs. Through the use of convolutional neural networks, an IRDC catalog consisting of 18,845 items was created by two astronomers named Jyothish Pari and Joe Hora, who created a computer algorithm which could efficiently scan the images created by the Spitzer telescope’s IRAC camera to find infrared dark clouds.

== Importance ==
Astronomers believe that they represent the earliest stage in the formation of high-mass stars and are therefore of great importance for understanding the star formation process as a whole.

== Statistics and Mass ==
A millimeter-continuum survey of 38 IRDCs found cloud masses ranging from 120 to 16,000 solar masses, with a median of about 940 solar masses; the dense dust cores embedded within them ranged from 10 to 2,100 solar masses, with a median of about 120 solar masses.

== See also ==
- Galactic plane
- Intergalactic star
- Star formation
- Dark nebula
