= List of NGC objects (6001–7000) =

This is a list of NGC objects 6001–7000 from the New General Catalogue (NGC). The astronomical catalogue is composed mainly of star clusters, nebulae, and galaxies. Other objects in the catalogue can be found in the other subpages of the list of NGC objects.

The constellation information in these tables is taken from The Complete New General Catalogue and Index Catalogue of Nebulae and Star Clusters by J. L. E. Dreyer, which was accessed using the "VizieR Service". Galaxy types are identified using the NASA/IPAC Extragalactic Database. The other data of these tables are from the SIMBAD Astronomical Database unless otherwise stated.

== 6001–6100 ==
NGC number	Other names	Object type	Constellation	Right ascension (J2000)	Declination (J2000)	Apparent magnitude
6005		Open cluster	Norma	15^{h} 55^{m} 58^{s}	−57° 26′ 24″	10.7
6008	NGC 6008A	Barred spiral galaxy	Serpens	15^{h} 52^{m} 56.288^{s}	+21° 06′ 01.819″	12.9
6025		Open cluster	Triangulum Australe	16^{h} 03^{m} 42^{s}	−60° 30′ 00″	5.1
6027	(Part of Seyfert's Sextet)	Interacting galaxy	Serpens	15^{h} 59^{m} 12.7^{s}	+20° 45′ 47″	14.7
6027a	(Part of Seyfert's Sextet)	Interacting galaxy	Serpens	15^{h} 59^{m} 11.5^{s}	+20° 45′ 14″	15.1
6027b	(Part of Seyfert's Sextet)	Interacting galaxy	Serpens	15^{h} 59^{m} 11.0^{s}	+20° 45′ 42″	15.4
6027c	(Part of Seyfert's Sextet)	Interacting galaxy	Serpens	15^{h} 59^{m} 12.1^{s}	+20° 44′ 47″	16.0
6027d	(Part of Seyfert's Sextet)	Spiral galaxy	Serpens	15^{h} 59^{m} 13.2^{s}	+20° 45′ 33″	15.6
6027e	(Part of Seyfert's Sextet)	Interacting galaxy	Serpens	15^{h} 59^{m} 15.1^{s}	+20° 45′ 55″	16.5
6028	NGC 6046	Barred lenticular galaxy, ring galaxy	Hercules	16^{h} 01^{m} 28.9^{s}	19° 21′ 36″	14.35
6031		Open cluster	Norma	16^{h} 07^{m} 51.4^{s}	−54° 03′ 03″	8.5
6039	NGC 6042	Lenticular galaxy	Hercules	16^{h} 04^{m} 39.6^{s}	+17° 42′ 03″	14.9
6040		Spiral galaxy	Hercules	16^{h} 04^{m} 26.7^{s}	17° 45′ 01″	15.07
6041		Elliptical galaxy	Hercules	16^{h} 04^{m} 35.8^{s}	+17° 43′ 18″	14.5
6042	(Duplicate of NGC 6039)	Lenticular galaxy	Hercules	16^{h} 04^{m} 39.6^{s}	+17° 42′ 03″	14.9
6043		Interacting galaxy	Hercules	16^{h} 005^{m} 01.2^{s}	+17° 46′ 26″	15.4
6044		Lenticular galaxy	Hercules	16^{h} 04^{m} 59.7^{s}	17° 52′ 13″	14.9
6045		Barred spiral galaxy	Hercules	16^{h} 05^{m} 07.9^{s}	17° 45′ 28″	14.9
6046	(Duplicate of NGC 6028)	Barred lenticular galaxy, ring galaxy	Hercules	16^{h} 01^{m} 28.9^{s}	19° 21′ 36″	14.35
6047		Elliptical galaxy	Hercules	16^{h} 05^{m} 09.0^{s}	17° 43′ 48″	14.55
6050		Spiral galaxy	Hercules	16^{h} 05^{m} 23.3^{s}	+17° 45′ 26″	15.2
6051		Elliptical galaxy	Serpens	16^{h} 04^{m} 56.6^{s}	+23° 55′ 57.7″	0.19
6052	NGC 6064	Interacting galaxy	Hercules	16^{h} 05^{m} 12.880^{s}	+20° 32′ 32.61″	13.0
6053	NGC 6057	Elliptical galaxy	Hercules	16^{h} 05^{m} 39.6^{s}	18° 09′ 52″	15.3
6054		Barred lenticular galaxy	Hercules	16^{h} 05^{m} 38.1^{s}	17° 46′ 04″	15.1
6055		Barred lenticular galaxy	Hercules	16^{h} 05^{m} 32.5^{s}	18° 09′ 34″	14.7
6056		Barred lenticular galaxy	Hercules	16^{h} 05^{m} 31.3^{s}	17° 57′ 49″	14.6
6057	(Duplicate of NGC 6053)	Elliptical galaxy	Hercules	16^{h} 05^{m} 39.6^{s}	18° 09′ 52″	15.3
6061		Lenticular galaxy	Hercules	16^{h} 06^{m} 16.0^{s}	18° 15′ 00″	14.4
6064	(Duplicate of NGC 6052)	Interacting galaxy	Hercules	16^{h} 05^{m} 12.880^{s}	+20° 32′ 32.61″	13.0
6067		Open cluster	Norma	16^{h} 13.2^{m}	−54° 13′	5.6
6070		Spiral galaxy	Serpens	16^{h} 09^{m} 58.6618^{s}	+00° 42′ 33.455″	12.45
6072		Planetary nebula	Scorpius	16^{h} 12^{m} 58.363^{s}	−36° 13′ 47.40″	14
6078		Elliptical galaxy	Hercules	16^{h} 12^{m} 05.445^{s}	+14° 12′ 31.624″	15.2
6085		Spiral galaxy	Corona Borealis	16^{h} 12^{m} 35.237^{s}	+29° 21′ 53.68″	14.5
6086		Elliptical galaxy	Corona Borealis	16^{h} 12^{m} 35.4^{s}	+29° 29′ 02″	12.7
6087	Caldwell 89	Open cluster	Norma	16^{h} 19^{m}	−57° 56′	5.9
6090		Interacting galaxies	Draco	16^{h} 11^{m} 40.70^{s}	52° 27′ 24.0″	14.00
6093	Messier 80	Globular cluster	Scorpius	16^{h} 17^{m} 02.5^{s}	−22° 58′ 30″	8.7

== 6101–6200 ==
NGC number	Other names	Object type	Constellation	Right ascension (J2000)	Declination (J2000)	Apparent magnitude
6101	Caldwell 107	Globular cluster	Apus	16^{h} 25^{m} 48.12^{s}	−72° 12′ 07.9″	9
6104	IRAS 16146 + 3549; MCG 6-36-11; PGC 57684; UGC 10309	Barred spiral galaxy	Corona Borealis	16^{h} 16^{m} 30.7^{s}	+35° 42′ 29″	12.933
6106		Spiral galaxy	Hercules	16^{h} 18^{m} 47.1712^{s}	+07° 24′ 39.319″	12.84
6115		Open cluster	Norma	16^{h} 24^{m} 43.2^{s}	−51° 56′ 24″	9.8
6118		Grand design spiral galaxy	Serpens	16^{h} 21^{m} 48.6^{s}	−02° 17′ 00″	12.42
6120		Spiral galaxy	Corona Borealis	16^{h} 19^{m} 48.1^{s}	+37° 46′ 28″	14.6
6121	Messier 4	Globular cluster	Scorpius	16^{h} 23^{m} 35.4^{s}	−26° 31′ 32″	8.1
6124	Caldwell 75	Open cluster	Scorpius	16^{h} 25^{m} 36^{s}	−40° 40′ 00″	5.8
6125	NGC 6128	Elliptical galaxy	Draco	16^{h} 19^{m} 11.7^{s}	+57° 59′ 03″	13.0
6127	(Duplicate of NGC 6125)	Elliptical galaxy	Draco	16^{h} 19^{m} 11.7^{s}	+57° 59′ 03″	13.0
6128	(Duplicate of NGC 6125)	Elliptical galaxy	Draco	16^{h} 19^{m} 11.7^{s}	+57° 59′ 03″	13.0
6134		Open cluster	Norma	16^{h} 27^{m} 46.5^{s}	–49° 09′ 04″	7.2
6139		Globular cluster	Scorpius	16^{h} 27^{m} 41.6^{s}	–38° 50′ 18″	9.68
6142		Spiral galaxy	Corona Borealis	16^{h} 23^{m} 21.0702^{s}	+37° 15′ 30.466″	14.3g
6144		Globular cluster	Scorpius	16^{h} 27^{m} 14.1^{s}	–26° 01′ 29″	9.63
6145		Spiral galaxy	Hercules	16^{h} 25^{m} 02.3795^{s}	+40° 56′ 47.926″	14.5g
6152		Open cluster	Norma	16^{h} 33^{m}	−52° 38′	8.1
6153		Planetary nebula	Scorpius	16^{h} 31^{m} 30.6^{s}	–40° 15′ 12″	9.9
6158	CGCG 224-31; MCG 7-34-41; PGC 58198	Elliptical galaxy	Hercules	16^{h} 27^{m} 40.9^{s}	+39° 22′ 59″	14.68
6164	HD 148937; SAO 226891	Variable star and diffuse nebula	Norma	16^{h} 33^{m} 52.4^{s}	−48° 06′ 40″	7.0
6165	HD 148937; SAO 226891	Variable star and diffuse nebula	Norma	16^{h} 33^{m} 52.4^{s}	−48° 06′ 40″	7.0
6166	UGC 10409; PGC 58265	Elliptical galaxy	Hercules	16^{h} 28^{m} 38.276^{s}	+39° 33′ 04.97″	12.78
6167		Open cluster	Norma	16^{h} 34^{m} 34^{s}	−49° 46′ 18″	6.7
6169		Open cluster	Norma and Scorpius	16^{h} 34^{m} 06.7^{s}	−44° 00′ 58″	6.6
6171	Messier 107	Globular cluster	Ophiuchus	16^{h} 32^{m} 31.9^{s}	−13° 03′ 13″	10.0
6181	PGC 58470	Barred spiral galaxy	Hercules	16^{h} 32^{m} 20.9^{s}	+19° 49′ 36″	10.42
6185	UGC 10440	Spiral galaxy	Hercules	16^{h} 33^{m} 17.83^{s}	+35° 20′ 32.43″	14.5
6188	Rim Nebula	Diffuse nebula	Ara	16^{h} 40^{m} 05^{s}	−48° 47′	
6193		Open cluster	Ara	16^{h} 41^{m}	−48° 46′	5.3
6195		Spiral galaxy	Hercules	16^{h} 36^{m} 32.5835^{s}	+39° 01′ 40.475″	14.0g
6200		Open cluster	Ara	16^{h} 44^{m} 06.(0)^{s}	−47° 28′ (00)″	7.4

== 6201–6300 ==
NGC number	Other names	Object type	Constellation	Right ascension (J2000)	Declination (J2000)	Apparent magnitude
6204		Open cluster	Ara	16^{h} 46^{m} 08.(4)^{s}	−47° 01′ 1(2)″	8.2
6205	Messier 13; Hercules Globular Cluster	Globular cluster	Hercules	16^{h} 41^{m} 41^{s}	+36° 27′ 37″	5.8
6207	UGC 10521; MCG 6-37-7; ZWG 197.7; PGC 58827; KUG 1641+369; IRAS16412+3655; KARA 766; Uppsala 10521	Spiral galaxy	Hercules	16^{h} 43^{m} 03.7^{s}	+36° 49′ 57″	11.7 ± 0.4
6208		Open cluster	Ara	16^{h} 49^{m} 28.(0)^{s}	−53° 43′ 4(2)″	7.2
6209		Spiral galaxy	Apus	16^{h} 54^{m} 57.6600^{s}	−72° 35′ 11.900″	11.41
6210		Planetary nebula	Hercules	16^{h} 44^{m} 29.5^{s}	+23° 48′ 00″	12.3
6212		Spiral galaxy	Hercules	16^{h} 43^{m} 23.1^{s}	+39° 48′ 23″	17.595 ± 0.040
6215	PGC 59112	Spiral galaxy	Ara	16^{h} 51^{m} 06.811^{s}	−58° 59′ 36.46″	11.2
6217		Barred spiral galaxy	Ursa Minor	16^{h} 32^{m} 39.217^{s}	+78° 11′ 53.56″	11.2
6218	Messier 12	Globular cluster	Ophiuchus	16^{h} 47^{m} 14.5^{s}	−01° 56′ 52″	8.5
6221	ESO 138-3; AM 1648-590; IRAS16484-5908; PGC 59175	Barred spiral galaxy	Ara	16^{h} 52^{m} 46.1^{s}	−59° 13′ 07″	9.28
6229	GCL 47	Globular cluster	Hercules	16^{h} 46^{m} 58.8^{s}	+47° 31′ 40″	9.4
6231	Caldwell 76	Open cluster	Scorpius	16^{h} 54^{m} 08.5^{s}	−41° 49′ 36″	2.8
6239	UGC 10577; MCG 7-35-1; ZWG 225.2; PGC 59083; ZWG 224.105; IRAS16484+4249	Barred spiral galaxy	Hercules	16^{h} 50^{m} 5^{s}	+42° 44′ 23″	11.27
6240	Starfish Galaxy	Irregular galaxy	Ophiuchus	16^{h} 52^{m} 59.0^{s}	+02° 24′ 02″	14.7
6242		Open cluster	Scorpius	16^{h} 55^{m}	−39° 28′	7.1
6254	Messier 10	Globular cluster	Ophiuchus	16^{h} 57^{m} 09.0^{s}	−04° 05′ 58″	6.4
6256	GCL 49.1; ESO 391-SC6 vdB-Hagen 208	Globular cluster	Scorpius	16^{h} 59^{m} 32.7^{s}	−37° 07′ 17″	11.3
6266	Messier 62	Globular cluster	Ophiuchus	17^{h} 01^{m} 12.6^{s}	−30° 06′ 45″	8.6
6273	Messier 19	Globular cluster	Ophiuchus	17^{h} 02^{m} 37.7^{s}	−26° 16′ 05″	8.5
6281		Open cluster	Scorpius	17^{h} 04.7^{m}	−37° 59′	5.4
6284	GCL 53; ESO 518-SC9	Globular cluster	Ophiuchus	17^{h} 04^{m} 28.7^{s}	−24° 45′ 52″	8.9
6285	MCG 10-24-81; ZWG 299.37; ARP 293; PGC 59344; KAZ 111	Spiral galaxy	Draco	16^{h} 58^{m} 24^{s}	+58° 57′ 21″	14.48 ± 0.15
6286	GCL 49.1; ESO 391-SC6 vdB-Hagen 208	Spiral galaxy	Draco	16^{h} 58^{m} 31.4^{s}	+58° 56′ 11″	11.3
6287	GCL 54; ESO 518-SC10	Globular cluster	Ophiuchus	17^{h} 05^{m} 19.3^{s}	−22° 42′ 29″	9.3
6293	GCL 55; ESO 519-SC5	Globular cluster	Ophiuchus	17^{h} 16^{m} 59.5^{s}	−26° 34′ 54″	8.3
6300	ESO 101-25; VV 734; IRAS17123-6245; PGC 60001	Seyfert galaxy	Ara	17^{h} 16^{m} 59.5^{s}	−62° 49′ 40″	8.78

== 6301–6400 ==
NGC number	Other names	Object type	Constellation	Right ascension (J2000)	Declination (J2000)	Apparent magnitude
6302	Bug Nebula	Planetary nebula	Scorpius	17^{h} 13^{m} 44.2^{s}	−37° 06′ 16″	7.1
6304	ESO454-SC2	Globular cluster	Ophiuchus	17^{h} 14^{m} 32.5^{s}	−29° 27′ 44″	8.22
6308		Intermediate spiral galaxy	Hercules	17^{h} 11^{m} 59.7148^{s}	+23° 22′ 47.795″	13.4
6309	PK 9+14.1; CS=14.4; Box nebula	Planetary nebula	Ophiuchus	17^{h} 14^{m} 04.3^{s}	−12° 54′ 38″	11.5
6316	GCL 57; ESO 454-SC4	Globular cluster	Ophiuchus	17^{h} 16^{m} 37.4^{s}	−28° 08′ 24″	8.1
6324		Spiral galaxy	Ursa Minor	17^{h} 05^{m} 25.4687^{s}	+75° 24′ 26.061″	13.8
6325	GCL 58; ESO 519-SC11	Globular cluster	Ophiuchus	17^{h} 17^{m} 59.3^{s}	−23° 45′ 58″	10.2
6326	PK 338-8.1; ESO 228-PN1; AM 1716-514; CS=13.5	Planetary nebula	Ara	17^{h} 20^{m} 46.3^{s}	−51° 45′ 16″	12.2
6328	ESO 102-3; AM 1718-645; PGC 60198	Spiral galaxy	Ara	17^{h} 23^{m} 41.0^{s}	−12° 54′ 38″	7.64
6331		Elliptical galaxy	Ursa Minor	17^{h} 03^{m} 35.97^{s}	+78° 37′ 44.40″	14.4
6333	Messier 9	Globular cluster	Ophiuchus	17^{h} 19^{m} 11.8^{s}	−18° 30′ 59″	9.4
6334	Cat's Paw Nebula	Diffuse nebula	Scorpius	17^{h} 19^{m} 58.0^{s}	−35° 57′ 47″	
6340		Spiral galaxy	Draco	17^{h} 10^{m} 25.1^{s}	+72° 18′ 17″	11.9
6341	Messier 92	Globular cluster	Hercules	17^{h} 17^{m} 07.3^{s}	+43° 08′ 12″	6.3
6357	War and Peace Nebula	Diffuse nebula	Scorpius	17^{h} 24^{m}	−34° 20′	
6369	Little Ghost Nebula	Planetary nebula	Ophiuchus	17^{h} 29^{m} 20.4^{s}	−23° 45′ 34″	16.6
6375		Elliptical galaxy	Hercules	17^{h} 29^{m} 21.877^{s}	+16° 12′ 24.47″	14.5
6380		Globular cluster	Scorpius	17^{h} 34^{m} 28.00^{s}	−39° 04′ 09.0″	11.31
6389		Spiral galaxy	Hercules	17^{h} 32^{m} 39.7745^{s}	+16° 24′ 06.604″	12.82
6397		Globular cluster	Ara	17^{h} 40^{m} 41.4^{s}	−53° 40′ 25″	7.4

== 6401–6500 ==
NGC number	Other names	Object type	Constellation	Right ascension (J2000)	Declination (J2000)	Apparent magnitude
6401		Globular cluster	Ophiuchus	17^{h} 38^{m} 36.93^{s}	−23° 54′ 31.5″	7.4
6402	Messier 14	Globular cluster	Ophiuchus	17^{h} 37^{m} 36.2^{s}	−03° 14′ 45″	9.6
6405	Messier 6; Butterfly Cluster	Open cluster	Scorpius	17^{h} 40^{m}	−32° 12′	4.5
6412		Spiral galaxy	Draco	17^{h} 29^{m} 37.5^{s}	+75° 42′ 16″	11.62
6426		Globular cluster	Ophiuchus	17^{h} 44^{m} 54.7^{s}	+3° 10′ 13″	11.01
6440		Globular cluster	Sagittarius	17^{h} 48^{m} 52.7^{s}	−20° 21′ 36.9″	10.1
6441		Globular cluster	Scorpius	17^{h} 50^{m} 13.06^{s}	−37° 03′ 05.2″	7.2
6445		Planetary nebula	Sagittarius	17^{h} 49^{m} 15^{s}	−20° 00′ 35″	11.2
6448	non-existent					
6452		Lenticular galaxy	Hercules	17^{h} 47^{m} 58.5^{s}	+20° 50′ 16″	14.4
6453		Globular cluster	Scorpius	17^{h} 50^{m} 51.7^{s}	−34° 35′ 59.6″	10.1
6475	Messier 7	Open cluster	Scorpius	17^{h} 54^{m}	−34° 47′	3.5
6492		Spiral galaxy	Pavo	18^{h} 02^{m} 48.377^{s}	−66° 25′ 50.015″	11.5
6494	Messier 23	Open cluster	Sagittarius	17^{h} 57^{m}	−18° 59′	6.0
6496		Globular cluster	Scorpius	17^{h} 59^{m} 02.0^{s}	−44° 15′ 55″	10.0
6500		Spiral galaxy	Hercules	17^{h} 55^{m} 59.8^{s}	+18° 20′ 18″	13.4

== 6501–6600 ==
NGC number	Other names	Object type	Constellation	Right ascension (J2000)	Declination (J2000)	Apparent magnitude
6505	Altieri's lens	Elliptical galaxy	Draco	17^{h} 51^{m} 07.440^{s}	+65° 31′ 50.75″	14.6
6509		Spiral galaxy	Ophiuchus	17^{h} 59^{m} 25.315^{s}	+06° 17′ 12.86″	12.13
6514	Messier 20; Trifid Nebula	Diffuse nebula	Sagittarius	18^{h} 02^{m} 23^{s}	−23° 02′	6.8
6520		Open cluster	Sagittarius	18^{h} 03^{m}	−27° 53′	7.6
6522	(Located in Baade's Window)	Globular cluster	Sagittarius	18^{h} 03^{m} 34.1^{s}	−30° 02′ 02″	10.7
6523	(Located in Messier 8 (Lagoon Nebula))	Open cluster	Sagittarius	18^{h} 03^{m}	−24° 23′	4.6
6530	(Located in Messier 8 (Lagoon Nebula))	Open cluster	Sagittarius	18^{h} 05^{m}	−24° 22′	4.7
6531	Messier 21	Open cluster	Sagittarius	18^{h} 04^{m}	−22° 29′	6.0
6537	Red Spider Nebula	Planetary nebula	Sagittarius	18^{h} 05^{m} 13.1^{s}	−19° 50′ 35″	13.6
6543	Cat's Eye Nebula	Planetary nebula	Draco	17^{h} 58^{m} 33.4^{s}	+66° 38′ 00″	9.8
6559		Diffuse nebula	Sagittarius	18^{h} 10^{m}	-24°	
6560		Spiral galaxy	Hercules	18^{h} 05^{m} 14.2^{s}	+46° 52′ 53″	14.2
6565		Planetary nebula	Sagittarius	18^{h} 11^{m} 52.5^{s}	−28° 10′ 42″	12.5
6566		Elliptical galaxy	Draco	18^{h} 07^{m} 00.65042^{s}	+52° 15′ 36.6716″	15.47
6569		Globular cluster	Sagittarius	18^{h} 13^{m} 38.88^{s}	−31° 49′ 35.2″	9.47
6570		Spiral galaxy	Ophiuchus	18^{h} 11^{m} 07^{s}	+14° 05′ 34″	13.2
6572		Planetary nebula	Ophiuchus	18^{h} 12^{m} 06^{s}	+06° 51′ 13″	9
6575		Elliptical galaxy	Hercules	18^{h} 10^{m} 57.5^{s}	31° 06′ 57″	13.0
6578		Planetary nebula	Sagittarius	18^{h} 16^{m} 16.5^{s}	−20° 27′ 03″	12.9
6584		Globular cluster	Telescopium	18^{h} 18^{m} 37.60^{s}	−52° 12′ 56.8″	
6589		Diffuse nebula	Sagittarius	18^{h} 16^{m} 50.4^{s}	−19° 53′ 24″	10.5
6590		Diffuse nebula	Sagittarius	18^{h} 17^{m} 00^{s}	−19° 53′	9.8
6600	(Duplicate of NGC 6599)	Galaxy	Hercules	18^{h} 15^{m} 43.0^{s}	25° 54′ 45″	13.62

== 6601–6700 ==
NGC number	Other names	Object type	Constellation	Right ascension (J2000)	Declination (J2000)	Apparent magnitude
6601		Galaxy	Draco	18^{h} 11^{m} 44.3^{s}	61° 27′ 12″	15.6
6602		Galaxy	Hercules	18^{h} 16^{m} 34.3^{s}	25° 02′ 39″	14.6
6603	(Part of Messier 24)	Open cluster	Sagittarius	18^{h} 18^{m}	−18° 26′	11.1
6604		Open cluster	Serpens	18^{h} 18^{m} 02.9^{s}	−12° 14′ 35″	6.5
6605		Open cluster	Serpens	18^{h} 16^{m} 21.7^{s}	−15° 00′ 55″	6.0
6606		Spiral galaxy	Lyra	18^{h} 14^{m} 41.6^{s}	° 43′ 16″	13.6
6607		Galaxy	Draco	18^{h} 12^{m} 14.7^{s}	° 61′ 19″	15.3
6608		Galaxy	Draco	18^{h} 12^{m} 28.9^{s}	° 61′ 17″	14.9
6609		Galaxy	Draco	18^{h} 12^{m} 33.6^{s}	° 61′ 19″	14.5
6610		Galaxy	Hercules	18^{h} 11^{m} 51.2^{s}	14° 58′ 54″	12.83
6611	Messier 16; Eagle Nebula	Open cluster	Serpens	18^{h} 19^{m}	−13° 49′	6.6
6612		Galaxy	Lyra	18^{h} 16^{m} 10.8^{s}	° 36′ 04″	14.5
6613	Messier 18	Open cluster	Sagittarius	18^{h} 20^{m}	−17° 06′	7.2
6614		Galaxy	Pavo	18^{h} 25^{m} 07.7^{s}	−63° 14′ 51″	12.1
6615		Galaxy	Ophiuchus	18^{h} 18^{m} 33.5^{s}	13° 15′ 54″	13.2
6616		Galaxy	Hercules	18^{h} 17^{m} 41.1^{s}	22° 14′ 18″	14.0
6617		Galaxy	Draco	18^{h} 14^{m} 02.5^{s}	61° 19′ 10″	14.7
6618	Messier 17; Swan Nebula; Omega Nebula	Open cluster	Sagittarius	18^{h} 20^{m} 26^{s}	−16° 11′	6.7
6619		Galaxy	Hercules	18^{h} 18^{m} 55.5^{s}	23° 39′ 20″	13.1
6620		Planetary nebula	Sagittarius	18^{h} 22^{m} 54.1^{s}	−26° 99′ 18″	12.7
6621		Interacting galaxy	Draco	18^{h} 12^{m} 55.3^{s}	68° 21′ 48″	14
6622		Interacting galaxy	Draco	18^{h} 12^{m} 59.8^{s}	68° 21′ 14″	15.0
6623		Galaxy	Hercules	18^{h} 19^{m} 42.9^{s}	23° 42′ 20″	13.3
6624		Globular cluster	Sagittarius	18^{h} 23^{m} 40.7^{s}	−30° 21′ 39″	8.7
6625		Open cluster	Scutum	18^{h} 23^{m} 02.0^{s}	−12° 01′ 26″	9.0
6626	Messier 28	Globular cluster	Sagittarius	18^{h} 24^{m} 32.9^{s}	−24° 52′ 11″	8.7
6627		Barred spiral galaxy	Hercules	18^{h} 22^{m} 38.9181^{s}	+15° 41′ 52.810″	14.3
6628		Galaxy	Hercules	18^{h} 22^{m} 21.9^{s}	° 23′ 28″	13.0
6629		Planetary nebula	Sagittarius	18^{h} 25^{m} 42.4^{s}	−23° 12′ 10″	11.3
6630		Galaxy	Pavo	18^{h} 32^{m} 35.1^{s}	−63° 17′ 36″	13.7
6631		Open cluster	Scutum	18^{h} 27^{m} 11.3^{s}	−12° 01′ 52″	11.7
6632		Galaxy	Hercules	18^{h} 25^{m} 03.1^{s}	° 27′ 32″	12.3
6633		Open cluster	Ophiuchus	18^{h} 27^{m} 31.2^{s}	+06° 34′ 12″	5.0
6634	Messier 69	Globular cluster	Sagittarius	18^{h} 31^{m} 23.2^{s}	−32° 20′ 53″	9.3
6635		Galaxy	Hercules	18^{h} 27^{m} 37.1^{s}	° 14′ 49″	13.5
6636		Galaxy	Draco	18^{h} 22^{m} 03.9^{s}	° 66′ 37″	13.5
6637	Messier 69	Globular cluster	Sagittarius	18^{h} 31^{m} 23.2^{s}	−32° 20′ 53″	9.3
6638		Globular cluster	Sagittarius	18^{h} 30^{m} 56.2^{s}	−25° 29′ 47″	9.2
6639		Open cluster	Scutum	18^{h} 30^{m} 59.3^{s}	−13° 09′ 21″	
6640		Galaxy	Lyra	18^{h} 28^{m} 08.3^{s}	° 34′ 18″	13.7
6641		Galaxy	Hercules	18^{h} 28^{m} 57.4^{s}	° 22′ 54″	13.5
6642		Globular cluster	Sagittarius	18^{h} 31^{m} 54.2^{s}	−23° 28′ 34″	8.9
6643		Galaxy	Draco	18^{h} 19^{m} 46.4^{s}	° 74′ 34″	11.5
6644		Planetary nebula	Sagittarius	18^{h} 32^{m} 34.7^{s}	−25° 07′ 44″	10.7
6645		Open cluster	Sagittarius	18^{h} 32^{m} 37.9^{s}	−16° 53′ 02″	8.5
6646		Spiral galaxy	Lyra	18^{h} 29^{m} 38.7^{s}	° 39′ 51″	13.0
6647		Open cluster	Sagittarius	18^{h} 32^{m} 49.3^{s}	−17° 13′ 43″	
6648		Double star	Draco	18^{h} 25^{m} 37.8^{s}	° 64′ 58″	
6649		Open cluster	Scutum	18^{h} 33^{m} 27.9^{s}	−10° 24′ 10″	8.9
6650		Galaxy	Draco	18^{h} 25^{m} 28.0^{s}	° 68′ 00″	13.9
6651		Galaxy	Draco	18^{h} 24^{m} 19.7^{s}	° 71′ 36″	13.3
6652		Globular cluster	Sagittarius	18^{h} 35^{m} 45.7^{s}	−32° 59′ 25″	8.5
6653		Galaxy	Pavo	18^{h} 44^{m} 38.4^{s}	−73° 15′ 48″	12.5
6654		Galaxy	Draco	18^{h} 24^{m} 07.6^{s}	° 73′ 11″	11.8
6655		Double star	Scutum	18^{h} 34^{m} 30.9^{s}	−05° 55′ 15″	
6656	Messier 22	Globular cluster	Sagittarius	18^{h} 36^{m} 24.2^{s}	−23° 54′ 12″	7.2
6664		Open cluster	Scutum	18^{h} 37^{m} 56^{s}	−08° 11′ 52″	7.8
6670		Pair of interacting galaxies	Draco	18^{h} 33^{m} 33.4^{s} (NGC 6670E) - 18^{h} 33^{m} 33.7^{s} (NGC 6670W)	+59° 53′ 16″ (NGC 6670E) - +59° 53′ 23″ (NGC 6670W)	14.3
6676		Spiral galaxy	Draco	18^{h} 33^{m} 09.8667^{s}	+66° 57′ 33.309″	14.4
6681	Messier 70	Globular cluster	Sagittarius	18^{h} 43^{m} 12.6^{s}	−32° 17′ 31″	9.8
6685		Elliptical galaxy	Lyra	18^{h} 39^{m} 58.6429^{s}	+39° 58′ 54.437″	13.4
6694	Messier 26	Open cluster	Scutum	18^{h} 45^{m}	−09° 23′	8.0

== 6701–6800 ==
NGC number	Other names	Object type	Constellation	Right ascension (J2000)	Declination (J2000)	Apparent magnitude
6702		Elliptical galaxy	Lyra	18^{h} 46^{m} 57,6^{s}	+45° 42′ 20″	12.2
6705	Messier 11; Wild Duck Cluster	Open cluster	Scutum	18^{h} 51^{m}	−06° 16′	6.3
6708		Spiral galaxy	Telescopium	18^{h} 55^{m} 35.5961^{s}	−53° 43′ 24.494″	12.7
6709		Open cluster	Aquila	18^{h} 51^{m}	+10° 19′	7.2
6712		Globular cluster	Scutum	18^{h} 53^{m} 04.3^{s}	−08° 42′ 22″	9.9
6715	Messier 54	Globular cluster	Sagittarius	18^{h} 55^{m} 03.3^{s}	−30° 28′ 43″	9.2
6717	Palomar 9	Globular cluster	Sagittarius	18^{h} 55^{m} 06.04^{s}	−22° 42′ 05.3″	9.28
6720	Messier 57; Ring Nebula	Planetary nebula	Lyra	18^{h} 53^{m} 35.1^{s}	+33° 01′ 45″	14.7
6723		Globular cluster	Sagittarius	18^{h} 59^{m} 33.1^{s}	−36° 37′ 53″	8.7
6726	Anteater Nebula	Nebula	Corona Australis	19^{h} 02^{m}	−35° 53′	
6727	Rampaging Baboon Nebula	Nebula	Corona Australis	19^{h} 02^{m}	−36° 54′	
6729	Caldwell 68	Nebula	Corona Australis	19^{h} 01^{m} 46.4^{s}	−36° 57′ 40″	
6738		Open cluster or asterism	Aquila	19^{h} 01^{m} 1(8.0)^{s}	+11° 37′ (00)″	8.3
6741	Phantom Streak Nebula	Planetary nebula	Aquila	19^{h} 00^{m} 02.3^{s}	−00° 31′ 23″	11
6742	Abell 50	Planetary nebula	Draco	18^{h} 59^{m} 20^{s}	+48° 27′ 55″	
6744		Spiral galaxy	Pavo	19^{h} 09^{m} 45.3^{s}	−63° 51′ 21″	9.2
6745		Interacting galaxies	Lyra	19^{h} 01^{m} 41.7^{s}	+40° 44′ 48″	13.3
6748	(Duplicate of NGC 6751)	Planetary nebula	Aquila	19^{h} 05^{m} 55.6^{s}	−05° 59′ 33″	15.8
6751	NGC 6748; Glowing Eye Nebula	Planetary nebula	Aquila	19^{h} 05^{m} 55.6^{s}	−05° 59′ 33″	15.8
6752	NGC 6777; Caldwell 93	Globular cluster	Pavo	19^{h} 10^{m} 51.8^{s}	−59° 58′ 55″	7.0
6753		Unbarred spiral galaxy	Pavo	19^{h} 11^{m} 23.635^{s}	−57° 02′ 58.44″	11.9
6754		Barred spiral galaxy	Telescopium	19^{h} 11^{m} 25.7664^{s}	−50° 38′ 31.397″	12.1
6755		Open cluster	Aquila	19^{h} 08^{m}	+04° 14′	8.6
6756		Open cluster	Aquila	19^{h} 08^{m} 44(9)^{s}	+04° 43′ 0(1)″	10.6
6760		Globular cluster	Aquila	19^{h} 11^{m} 12.1^{s}	+01° 01′ 50″	11.4
6766	(see NGC 6884)	Planetary nebula	Lyra	20^{h} 10^{m} 23.7^{s}	+46° 27′ 40″	11.9
6767		Double star	Lyra	19^{h} 11^{m} 34^{s}	+37° 43′ 31″	
6769		Spiral galaxy	Pavo	19^{h} 18^{m} 22.5975^{s}	−60° 30′ 03.208″	12.55
6774	Ruprecht 147	Star cluster	Sagittarius	19^{h} 16^{m} 42^{s}	−16° 17′ 00″	
6777	(Duplicate of NGC 6752)	Globular cluster	Pavo	19^{h} 10^{m} 51.8^{s}	−59° 58′ 55″	7.0
6778	NGC 6785	Planetary nebula	Aquila	19^{h} 18^{m} 25.0^{s}	−01° 35′ 47″	11.9
6779	Messier 56	Globular cluster	Lyra	19^{h} 16^{m} 35.5^{s}	+30° 11′ 04″	8.9
6781		Planetary nebula	Aquila	19^{h} 18^{m} 28.1^{s}	+06° 32′ 19″	11.4
6782		Spiral galaxy	Pavo	19^{h} 23^{m} 59.1^{s}	−59° 55′ 23″	12.7
6785	(Duplicate of NGC 6778)	Planetary nebula	Aquila	19^{h} 18^{m} 25.0^{s}	−01° 35′ 47″	11.9
6786		Interacting galaxy	Draco	19^{h} 10^{m} 53.91^{s}	73° 24′ 36.6″	12.80
6789		Irregular galaxy	Draco	19^{h} 16^{m} 41^{s}	+63° 58′ 23″	13.76
6790		Planetary nebula	Aquila	19^{h} 22^{m} 57.0^{s}	+01° 30′ 46″	12.5
6791		Open cluster	Lyra	19^{h} 20^{m} 53^{s}	+37° 46′	10.5
6794		Spiral galaxy	Sagittarius	19^{h} 28^{m} 03.8849^{s}	−38° 55′ 07.297″	13.9

== 6801–6900 ==
NGC number	Other names	Object type	Constellation	Right ascension (J2000)	Declination (J2000)	Apparent magnitude
6801		Spiral galaxy	Cygnus	19^{h} 27^{m} 35.8^{s}	+54° 22′ 22″	14.62
6803		Planetary nebula	Aquila	19^{h} 31^{m} 16.5^{s}	+10° 03′ 22″	15.2
6809	Messier 55	Globular cluster	Sagittarius	19^{h} 39^{m} 59.4^{s}	−30° 57′ 44″	8.1
6810		Spiral galaxy	Pavo	19^{h} 43^{m} 34.2^{s}	−58° 39′ 20.1″	11.6
6811		Open cluster	Cygnus	19^{h} 37^{m} 17^{s}	+46° 23′ 18″	6.8
6814		Spiral galaxy	Aquila	19^{h} 42^{m} 47.4^{s}	+10° 18′ 45″	11.2
6818	Little Gem Nebula	Planetary nebula	Sagittarius	19^{h} 43^{m} 57.8^{s}	−14° 09′ 12″	9.3
6819		Open cluster	Cygnus	19^{h} 41^{m} 18^{s}	+40° 11′ 00″	7.3
6820		Reflection nebula	Vulpecula	19^{h} 42^{m} 27.92^{s}	+23° 05′ 14.7″	
6822	Barnard's Galaxy	Irregular galaxy	Sagittarius	19^{h} 44^{m} 57.8^{s}	−14° 48′ 11″	18
6823		Open cluster	Vulpecula	19^{h} 42^{m} 27.92^{s}	+23° 05′ 14.7″	
6826	Blinking Planetary	Planetary nebula	Cygnus	19^{h} 44^{m} 48.2^{s}	+50° 31′ 30″	10.2
6834		Open cluster	Cygnus	19^{h} 52^{m} 12.5^{s}	+29° 24′ 29″	7.8
6838	Messier 71	Globular cluster	Sagitta	19^{h} 53^{m} 46.1^{s}	+18° 46′ 42″	7.9
6845	Klemola 30	Interacting galaxies	Telescopium	20^{h} 00^{m} 58.418^{s}	−47° 04′ 13.02″	
6850		Barred lenticular galaxy	Telescopium	20^{h} 03^{m} 30.081^{s}	−54° 50′ 40.88″	13.07
6853	Messier 27; Dumbbell Nebula	Planetary nebula	Vulpecula	19^{h} 59^{m} 36.3^{s}	+22° 43′ 16″	7.5
6861		Lenticular galaxy	Telescopium	20^{h} 07^{m} 19.48^{s}	−48° 22′ 12.8″	11.0
6862		Barred spiral galaxy	Telescopium	20^{h} 08^{m} 54.5801^{s}	−56° 23′ 30.300″	13.44
6863		Asterism	Aquila	20^{h} 05^{m} 7.3^{s}	−03° 33′ 16″	
6864	Messier 75	Globular cluster	Sagittarius	20^{h} 06^{m} 04.8^{s}	−21° 55′ 16″	10.0
6866		Open cluster	Cygnus	20^{h} 3.7^{m}	+44° 00′	7.6
6871		Open cluster	Cygnus	20^{h} 09^{m} 59.0^{s}	+35° 46′ 36″	6.5
6872	Condor Galaxy	Spiral galaxy	Pavo	20^{h} 16^{m} 56.0^{s}	−70° 46′ 03″	12.5
6881		Planetary nebula	Cygnus	20^{h} 10^{m} 52.45^{s}	+37° 24′ 32.4″	13.700
6884	NGC 6766	Planetary nebula	Cygnus	20^{h} 10^{m} 23.7^{s}	+46° 27′ 40″	11.9
6885	Caldwell 37	Open cluster	Vulpecula	20^{h} 12^{m} 00^{s}	+26° 29′ 00″	5.7/8.1
6886		Planetary nebula	Sagitta	20^{h} 12^{m} 42.83^{s}	+19° 59′ 22.6″	11.8
6888	Crescent Nebula	Diffuse nebula	Cygnus	20^{h} 12^{m} 07^{s}	+38° 21′	7.4
6891		Planetary nebula	Delphinus	20^{h} 15^{m} 08.8^{s}	+12° 42′ 16″	10

== 6901–7000 ==
NGC number	Other names	Object type	Constellation	Right ascension (J2000)	Declination (J2000)	Apparent magnitude
6902	IC 4948	Spiral galaxy	Sagittarius	20^{h} 24^{m} 28.1^{s}	−43° 39′ 12.4	11.82
6905		Planetary nebula	Delphinus	20^{h} 22^{m} 23^{s}	+20° 06′ 16″	10.9
6907		Spiral galaxy	Capricornus	20^{h} 25^{m} 06.6^{s}	−24° 48′ 33″	11.1
6910	OCl 181	Open cluster	Cygnus	20^{h} 23^{m} 08^{s}	+40° 46′ 30″	7.4
6913	Messier 29	Open cluster	Cygnus	20^{h} 23^{m} 56^{s}	+38° 31′	7.3
6914		Diffuse nebula	Cygnus	20^{h} 25^{m}	+42°	
6919		Intermediate spiral galaxy	Microscopium	20^{h} 31^{m} 38.0818^{s}	−44° 12′ 58.881″	13.58
6925		Unbarred spiral galaxy	Microscopium	20^{h} 34^{m} 20.566^{s}	−31° 58′ 51.20″	11.3
6934		Globular cluster	Delphinus	20^{h} 34^{m} 11.5^{s}	+07° 24′ 15″	10.5
6939		Open cluster	Cepheus	20^{h} 31^{m} 30^{s}	+60° 39′ 42″	7.8
6943		Barred spiral galaxy	Pavo	20^{h} 44^{m} 33.7818^{s}	−68° 44′ 51.324″	12.05
6946		Spiral galaxy	Cepheus	20^{h} 34^{m} 51.4^{s}	+60° 09′ 18″	10.5
6948		Spiral galaxy	Indus	20^{h} 43^{m} 29.14^{s}	−53° 21′ 24.2″	12.9
6951	NGC 6952	Barred spiral galaxy	Cepheus	20^{h} 37^{m} 14.1192^{s}	+66° 06′ 20.153″	11.0
6952	(Duplicate of NGC 6951)	Barred spiral galaxy	Cepheus	20^{h} 37^{m} 14.1192^{s}	+66° 06′ 20.153″	11.0
6956		Barred spiral galaxy	Delphinus	20^{h} 43^{m} 53.7237^{s}	+12° 30′ 42.856″	
6960	Western part of Veil Nebula 'Witch Broom'	Diffuse nebula	Cygnus	20^{h} 45^{m} 38.0^{s}	+30° 42′ 30″	7
6970		Barred spiral galaxy	Indus	20^{h} 52^{m} 09.4808^{s}	−48° 46′ 40.019″	13.16
6975	NGC 6976	Spiral galaxy	Aquarius	20^{h} 52^{m} 26.023^{s}	−05° 46′ 19.84″	14.95
6976	(Duplicate of NGC 6975)	Spiral galaxy	Aquarius	20^{h} 52^{m} 26.023^{s}	−05° 46′ 19.84″	14.95
6981	Messier 72	Globular cluster	Aquarius	20^{h} 53^{m} 27.9^{s}	−12° 32′ 13″	10.0
6984		Barred spiral galaxy	Indus	20^{h} 57^{m} 53.987^{s}	−51° 52′ 15.13″	12.65
6992	Eastern part of the Veil Nebula 'Banana Nebula'	Diffuse nebula	Cygnus	20^{h} 57^{m}	+31° 30′	
6993		Barred spiral galaxy	Capricornus	20^{h} 53^{m} 54.0499^{s}	−25° 28′ 20.920″	14.5
6994	Messier 73	Asterism	Aquarius	20^{h} 59^{m}	−12° 38′	8.9
6995	(Part of the Veil Nebula)	Diffuse nebula	Cygnus	20^{h} 57^{m}	+31° 13′	
6996		Association of stars	Cygnus	20^{h} 56^{m} 25^{s}	+45° 28′	
6997		Open cluster	Cygnus	20^{h} 56^{m} 40^{s}	+44° 39′	10.0
6998		Elliptical galaxy	Microscopium	21^{h} 01^{m} 37.7^{s}	−28° 01′ 55″	15.6
6999		Lenticular galaxy	Microscopium	21^{h} 01^{m} 59.5^{s}	−28° 03′ 32″	
7000	North America Nebula	Diffuse nebula	Cygnus	20^{h} 58^{m} 47^{s}	+44° 20′	4

== See also ==
- Lists of astronomical objects
