= NGC 6676 =

Galaxy in the constellation Draco

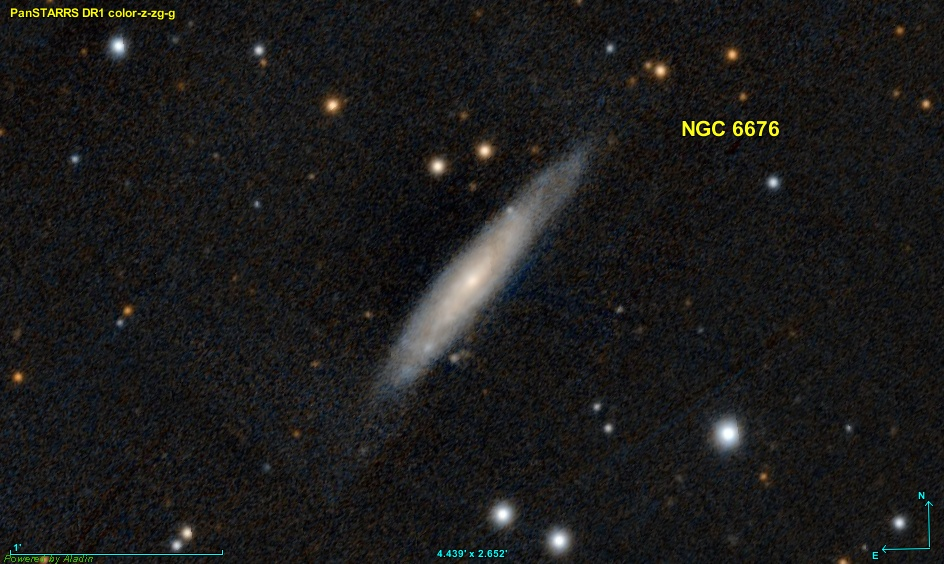
- NGC 6676 imaged by Pan-STARRS

Observation data (J2000 epoch)
- Constellation: Draco
- Right ascension: 18^{h} 33^{m} 09.8667^{s}
- Declination: +66° 57′ 33.309″
- Redshift: 0.022676
- Heliocentric radial velocity: 6798 ± 10 km/s
- Distance: 322.6 ± 22.6 Mly (98.92 ± 6.93 Mpc)
- Apparent magnitude (V): 14.4

Characteristics
- Type: Sbc
- Size: ~185,800 ly (56.98 kpc) (estimated)
- Apparent size (V): 1.6′ × 0.3′

Other designations
- IRAS 18331+6655, 2MASX J18331000+6657324, UGC 11286, MCG +11-22-054, PGC 62021, CGCG 322-045

NGC 6676 is a spiral galaxy in the constellation of Draco. Its velocity with respect to the cosmic microwave background is 6707 ± 12 km/s, which corresponds to a Hubble distance of 98.92 ± 6.93 Mpc (~323 million light-years). It was discovered by American astronomer Lewis Swift on 30 May 1886.

One supernova has been observed in NGC 6676: SN 2023txu (Type Ia, mag 18.96) was discovered by ATLAS on 3 October 2023.

== See also ==
- List of NGC objects (6001–7000)
