= NGC 6412 =

Spiral galaxy in the constellation Draco

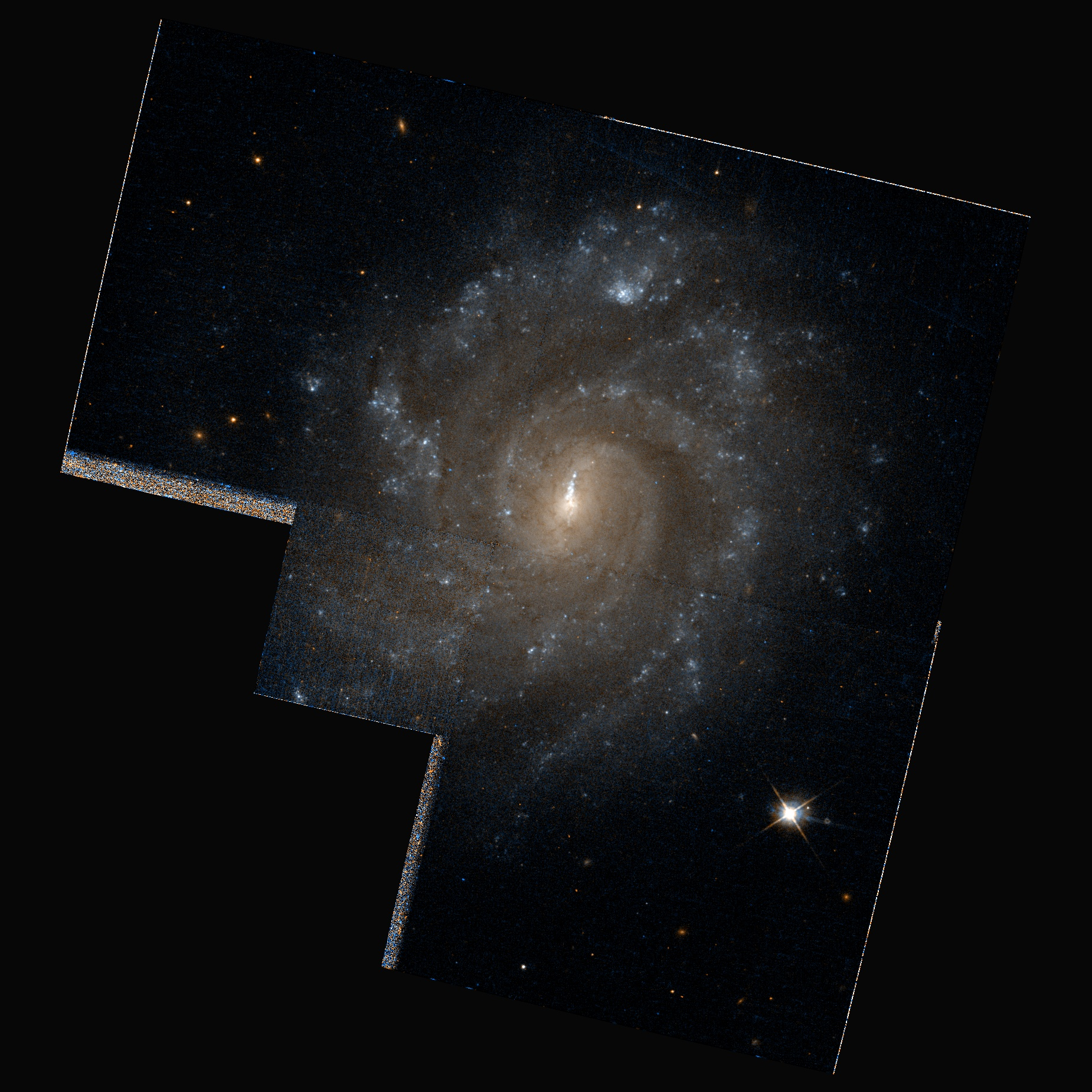
- NGC 6412 as seen through the Hubble Space Telescope

Observation data (J2000 epoch)
- Constellation: Draco
- Right ascension: 17^{h} 29^{m} 37.5^{s}
- Declination: +75° 42′ 16″
- Redshift: 0.004380±0.000003
- Heliocentric radial velocity: 1313±1 km/s
- Galactocentric velocity: 1504±8 km/s
- Apparent magnitude (V): 11.62
- Absolute magnitude (V): -20.24

Characteristics
- Type: SBc
- Apparent size (V): 2.50′ × 2.4′

Other designations
- UGC 10897, MCG 13-12-26, ZWG 355.34, PGC 60393, KAZ 146, IRAS17313+7544, ZWG 356.4, VV 444, ARP 38 and KARA 813
- References: NASA/IPAC extragalactic datatbase, http://spider.seds.org/

NGC 6412 is a spiral galaxy located in the constellation Draco. It is designated as SBc in the galaxy morphological classification scheme and was discovered by the British astronomer William Herschel on 12 December 1797. NGC 6412 is located at about 76.6Mly away from Earth.

== See also ==
- List of NGC objects (6001–7000)
- List of NGC objects
