= NGC 6078 =

Galaxy in the constellation Hercules

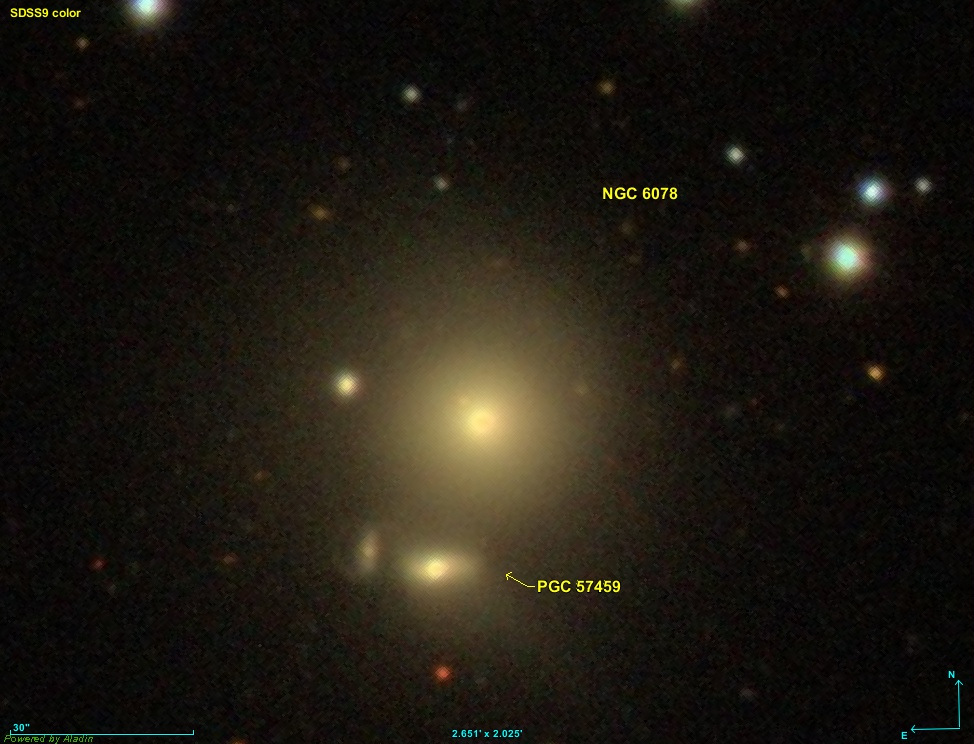
- NGC 6078 imaged by SDSS

Observation data (J2000 epoch)
- Constellation: Hercules
- Right ascension: 16^{h} 12^{m} 05.4433^{s}
- Declination: +14° 12′ 31.567″
- Redshift: 0.031282
- Heliocentric radial velocity: 9378 ± 44 km/s
- Distance: 455.1 ± 32.0 Mly (139.52 ± 9.81 Mpc)
- Apparent magnitude (V): 15.2

Characteristics
- Type: E0
- Size: ~168,800 ly (51.74 kpc) (estimated)
- Apparent size (V): 0.5′ × 0.5′

Other designations
- 2MASX J16120546+1412317, MCG +02-41-017, PGC 57460, CGCG 079-076

NGC 6078 is an elliptical galaxy in the constellation of Hercules. Its velocity with respect to the cosmic microwave background is 9459 ± 44 km/s, which corresponds to a Hubble distance of 139.52 ± 9.81 Mpc (~455 million light-years). It was discovered by French astronomer Édouard Stephan on 21 June 1876.

Very close to NGC 6078 are the galaxies PGC 57459 and SDSS J161206.68+141210.3.

One supernova has been observed in NGC 6078: SN 2011dv (Type Ia, mag. 16.2) was discovered by the Italian Supernovae Search Project on 28 June 2011.

== See also ==
- List of NGC objects (6001–7000)
