= NGC 6239 =

Galaxy in the constellation Hercules

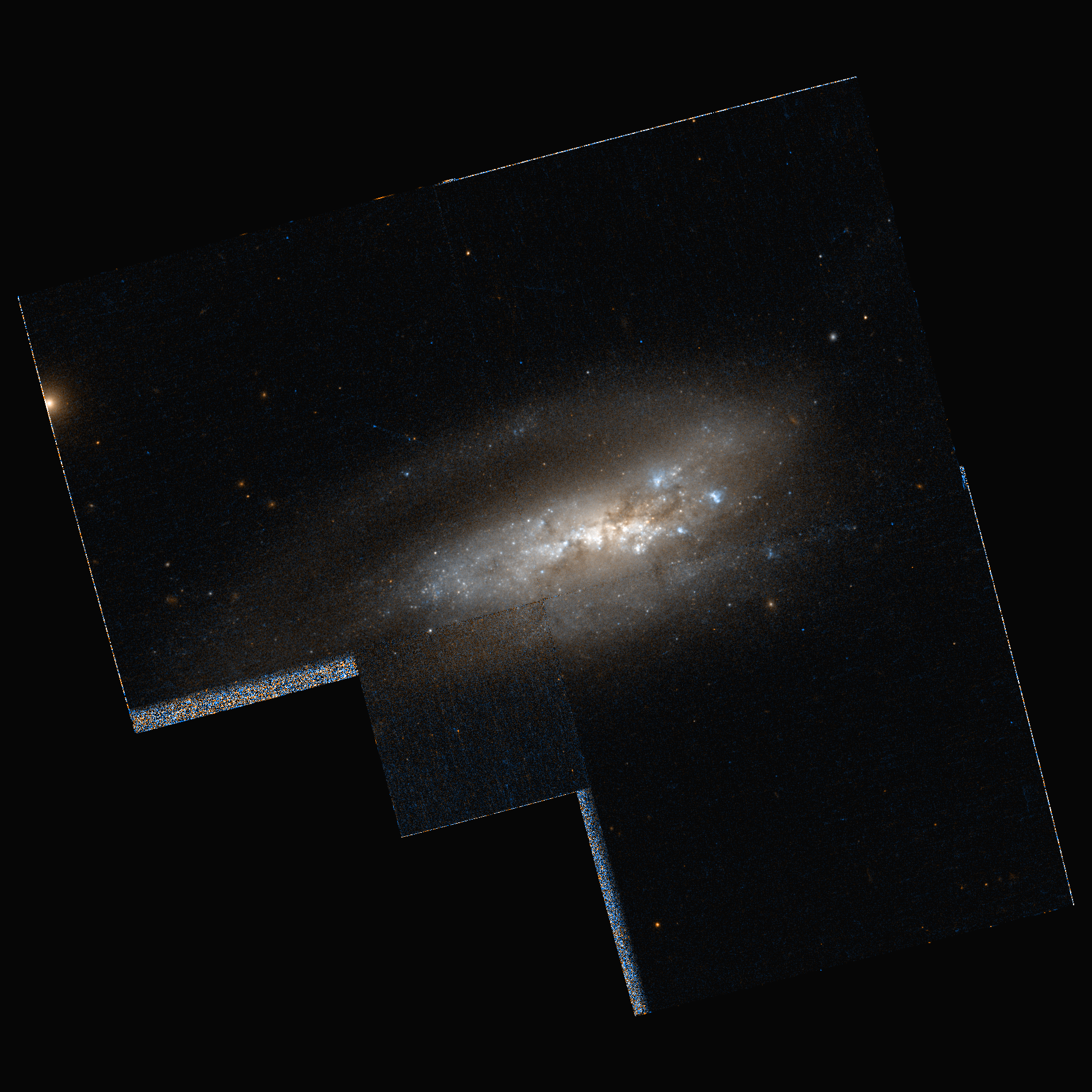
- NGC 6239 as seen through the Hubble Space Telescope

Observation data (J2000 epoch)
- Constellation: Hercules
- Right ascension: 16^{h} 50^{m} 5^{s}
- Declination: +42° 44′ 23″
- Redshift: 0.003079±0.000009
- Heliocentric radial velocity: 923±3 km/s
- Galactocentric velocity: 1095±7 km/s
- Distance: 42.4 million light years (13 million parsecs)
- Apparent magnitude (V): 11.27
- Absolute magnitude (V): -20.54

Characteristics
- Type: SB(s)B
- Size: 30,000 light years
- Apparent size (V): 2.40′ × 1.1′

Other designations
- UGC 10577, MCG 7-35-1, ZWG 225.2, PGC 59083, IRAS 16484+4249
- References: NASA/IPAC extragalactic datatbase, http://spider.seds.org/

NGC 6239 is a barred spiral galaxy located in the constellation Hercules with a distinct core. It is designated as SB(s)B in the galaxy morphological classification scheme and was discovered by the German-born British astronomer William Herschel on 12 April 1788. The galaxy is approximately 42 million light years away from Earth.

== See also ==
- List of NGC objects (6001–7000)
