= NGC 6158 =

Galaxy in the constellation Hercules

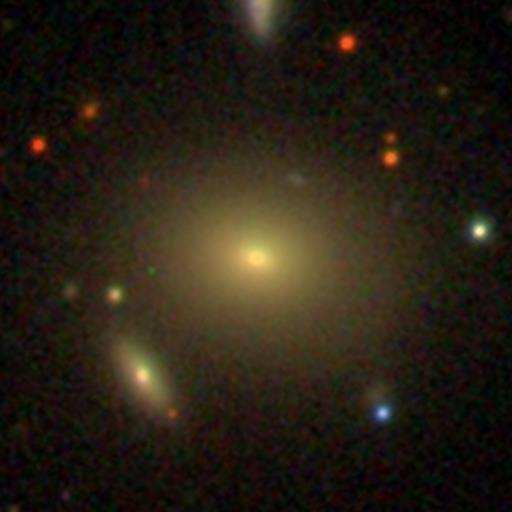
- SDSS image of NGC 6158.

Observation data (J2000 epoch)
- Constellation: Hercules
- Right ascension: 16^{h} 27^{m} 40.9^{s}
- Declination: 39° 22′ 59″
- Redshift: 0.029954
- Heliocentric radial velocity: 8980 km/s
- Distance: 123 Mpc (401 Mly)
- Group or cluster: Abell 2199
- Apparent magnitude (V): 14.68

Characteristics
- Type: E?
- Size: ~162,000 ly (49.6 kpc) (estimated)
- Apparent size (V): 0.3 x 0.25

Other designations
- CGCG 224-31, MCG 7-34-41, PGC 58198

NGC 6158 is an elliptical galaxy located about 400 million light-years away in the constellation Hercules. The galaxy was discovered by astronomer William Herschel on March 17, 1787 and is a member of Abell 2199.

== See also ==
- List of NGC objects (6001–7000)
- NGC 6166, A giant elliptical galaxy in the center of Abell 2199
