= NGC 6492 =

Galaxy in the constellation Pavo

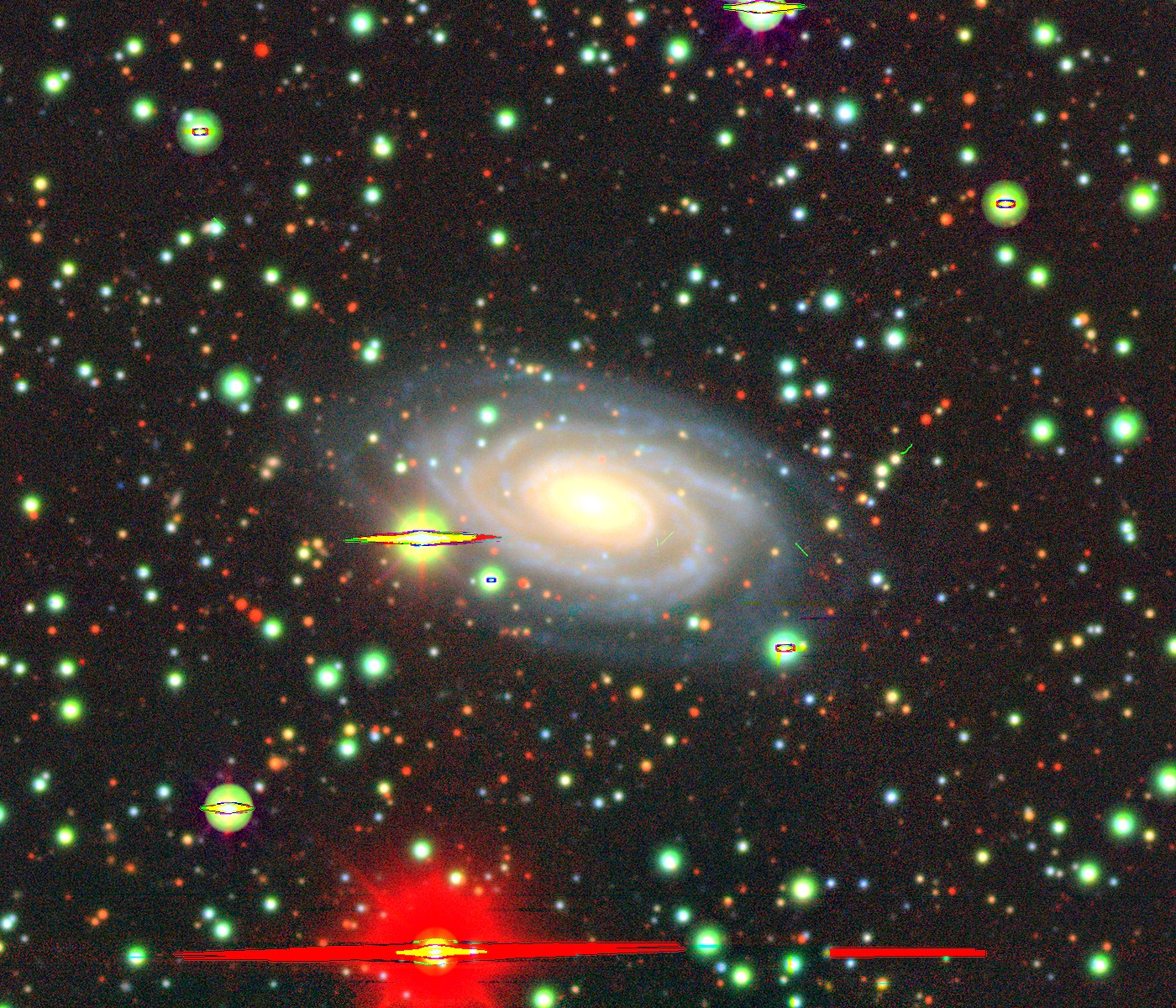
- NGC 6492 imaged by Legacy Surveys

Observation data (J2000 epoch)
- Constellation: Pavo
- Right ascension: 18^{h} 02^{m} 48.377^{s}
- Declination: −66° 25′ 50.015″
- Redshift: 0.014482
- Heliocentric radial velocity: 4342 ± 8 km/s
- Distance: 209.3 ± 14.6 Mly (64.17 ± 4.49 Mpc)
- Apparent magnitude (V): 11.5

Characteristics
- Type: SA(rs)bc?
- Size: ~179,200 ly (54.94 kpc) (estimated)
- Apparent size (V): 2.5′ × 1.2′

Other designations
- ESO 102-022, IRAS 17576-6625, 2MASX J18024831-6625503, PGC 61315

NGC 6492 is a spiral galaxy in the constellation of Pavo. Its velocity with respect to the cosmic microwave background is 4351 ± 8 km/s, which corresponds to a Hubble distance of 209.3 ± 14.6 Mly (64.17 ± 4.49 Mpc). In addition, five non redshift measurements give a distance of 183.10 ± 12.28 Mly (56.140 ± 3.766 Mpc). The galaxy was discovered by British astronomer John Herschel on 22 July 1835.

The SIMBAD database lists NGC 6492 as a Seyfert II Galaxy, i.e. it has a quasar-like nucleus with very high surface brightnesses whose spectra reveal strong, high-ionisation emission lines, but unlike quasars, the host galaxy is clearly detectable.

== Supernovae ==
Two supernovae have been observed in NGC 6492:

- SN 2004fv (Type Ia, mag. 14.8) was discovered by South African amateur astronomer Berto Monard on 4 November 2004.
- SN 2024sky (Type II, mag. 16.65) was discovered by the GOTO telescope array on 19 August 2024.

== See also ==
- List of NGC objects (6001–7000)
