= NGC 6212 =

Galaxy in the constellation Hercules

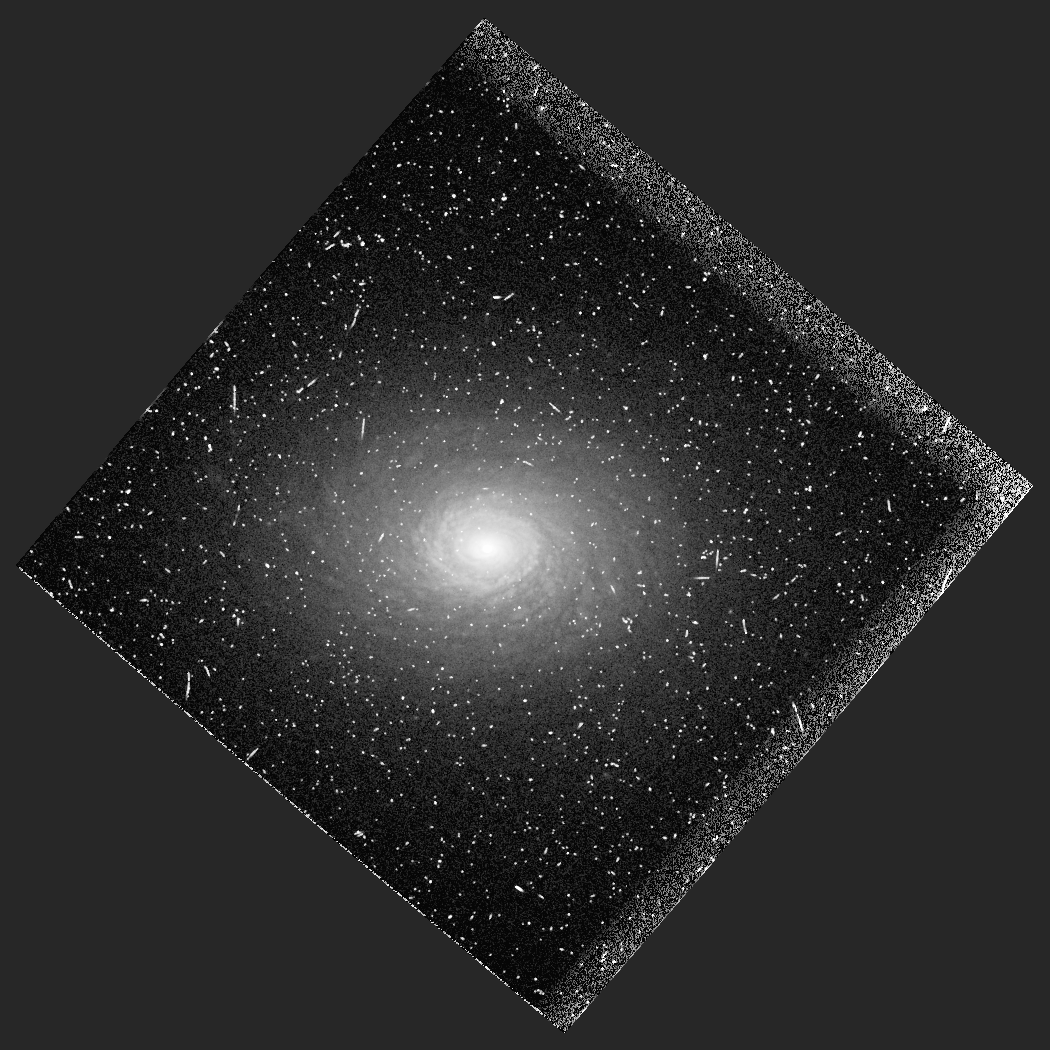
- NGC 6212 as seen through the Hubble Space Telescope

Observation data (J2000 epoch)
- Constellation: Hercules
- Right ascension: 16^{h} 43^{m} 23.1^{s}
- Declination: +39° 48′ 23″
- Redshift: 0.030281±0.000080
- Heliocentric radial velocity: 9078±24 km/s
- Galactocentric velocity: 9242±25 km/s
- Apparent magnitude (V): 17.595 +/- 0.040
- Absolute magnitude (V): -17.93 +/- 0.50

Characteristics
- Type: Sb
- Apparent size (V): 0.60′ × 0.4′

Other designations
- MCG 7-34-142, ZWG 224.96, PGC 58840
- References: NASA/IPAC extragalactic datatbase, http://spider.seds.org/

NGC 6212 is a spiral galaxy located in the constellation Hercules. It is designated as Sb in the galaxy morphological classification scheme and was discovered by the French astronomer Édouard Stephan on 26 July 1870. NGC 6212 is located at about 397 million light years from Earth.

== See also ==
- List of NGC objects (6001–7000)
