= NGC 6209 =

Galaxy in the constellation Apus

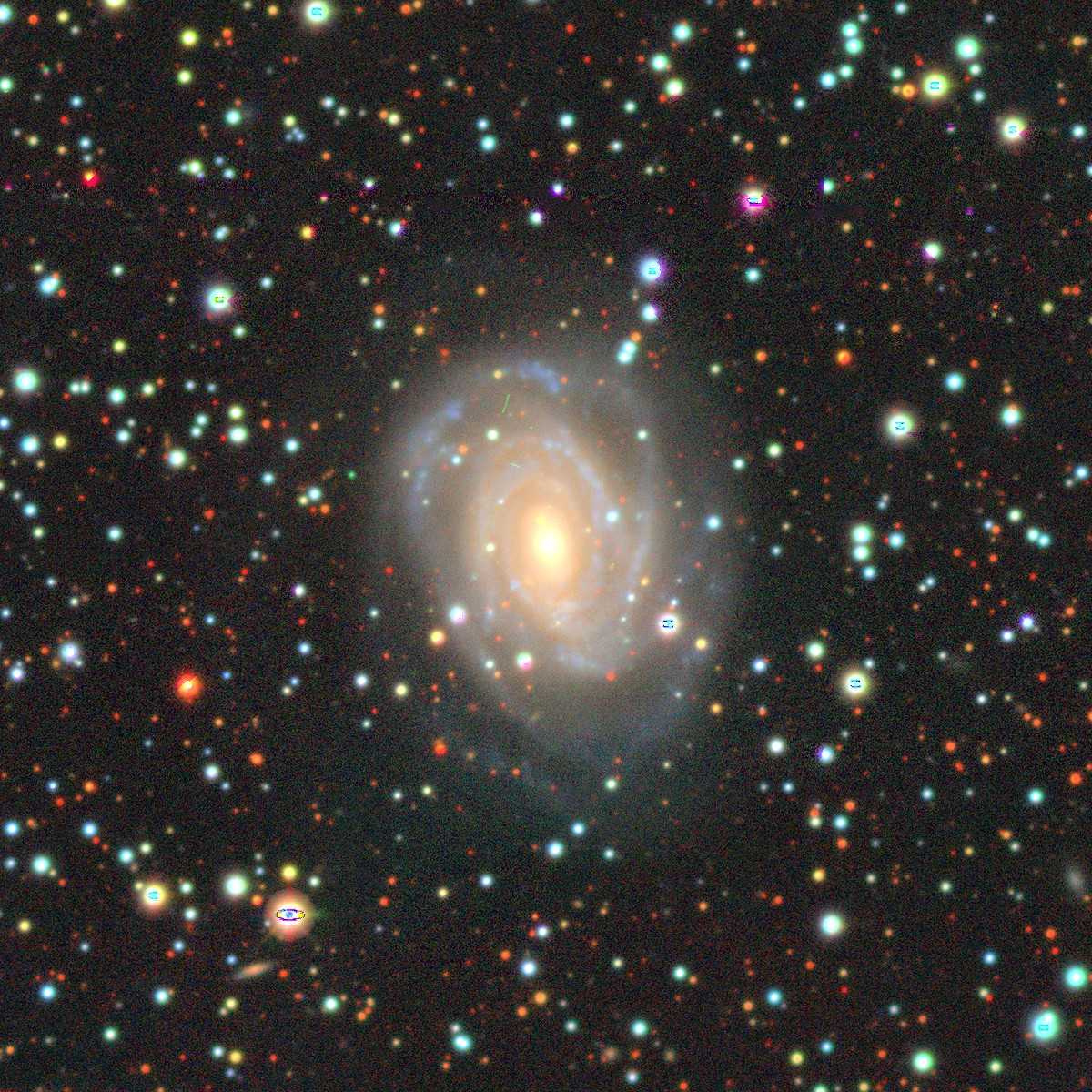
- NGC 6209 imaged by Legacy Surveys

Observation data (J2000 epoch)
- Constellation: Apus
- Right ascension: 16^{h} 54^{m} 57.6600^{s}
- Declination: −72° 35′ 11.900″
- Redshift: 0.019564±0.0000330
- Heliocentric radial velocity: 5,865±10 km/s
- Distance: 247.90 ± 5.50 Mly (76.008 ± 1.685 Mpc)
- Apparent magnitude (V): 11.41

Characteristics
- Type: (R')SA(rs)bc
- Size: ~222,300 ly (68.17 kpc) (estimated)
- Apparent size (V): 2.0′ × 1.6′

Other designations
- ESO 043- G 008, IRAS 16489-7230, 2MASX J16545747-7235136, PGC 59252

NGC 6209 is a spiral galaxy in the constellation of Apus. Its velocity with respect to the cosmic microwave background is 5,916±11 km/s, which corresponds to a Hubble distance of 284.6 ± 19.9 Mly (87.26 ± 6.11 Mpc). However, 13 non-redshift measurements give a closer mean distance of 247.90 ± 5.50 Mly (76.008 ± 1.685 Mpc). It was discovered by British astronomer John Herschel on 28 June 1835.

NGC 6209 is a Seyfert II galaxy, i.e. it has a quasar-like nucleus with very high surface brightnesses whose spectra reveal strong, high-ionisation emission lines, but unlike quasars, the host galaxy is clearly detectable. Additionally, NGC 6209 has a possible active galactic nucleus, i.e. it has a compact region at the center of a galaxy that emits a significant amount of energy across the electromagnetic spectrum, with characteristics indicating that this luminosity is not produced by the stars.

== Supernovae ==
Two supernovae have been observed in NGC 6209:

- SN 1998cx (Type Ia, mag. 17.8) was discovered by Alexander Wassilieff on 4 July 1998.
- SN 2009fz (Type IIb, mag. 16.5) was discovered by the CHilean Automatic Supernova sEarch (CHASE) on 8 June 2009.

== See also ==
- List of NGC objects (6001–7000)
