= NGC 6948 =

Spiral galaxy in the constellation Indus

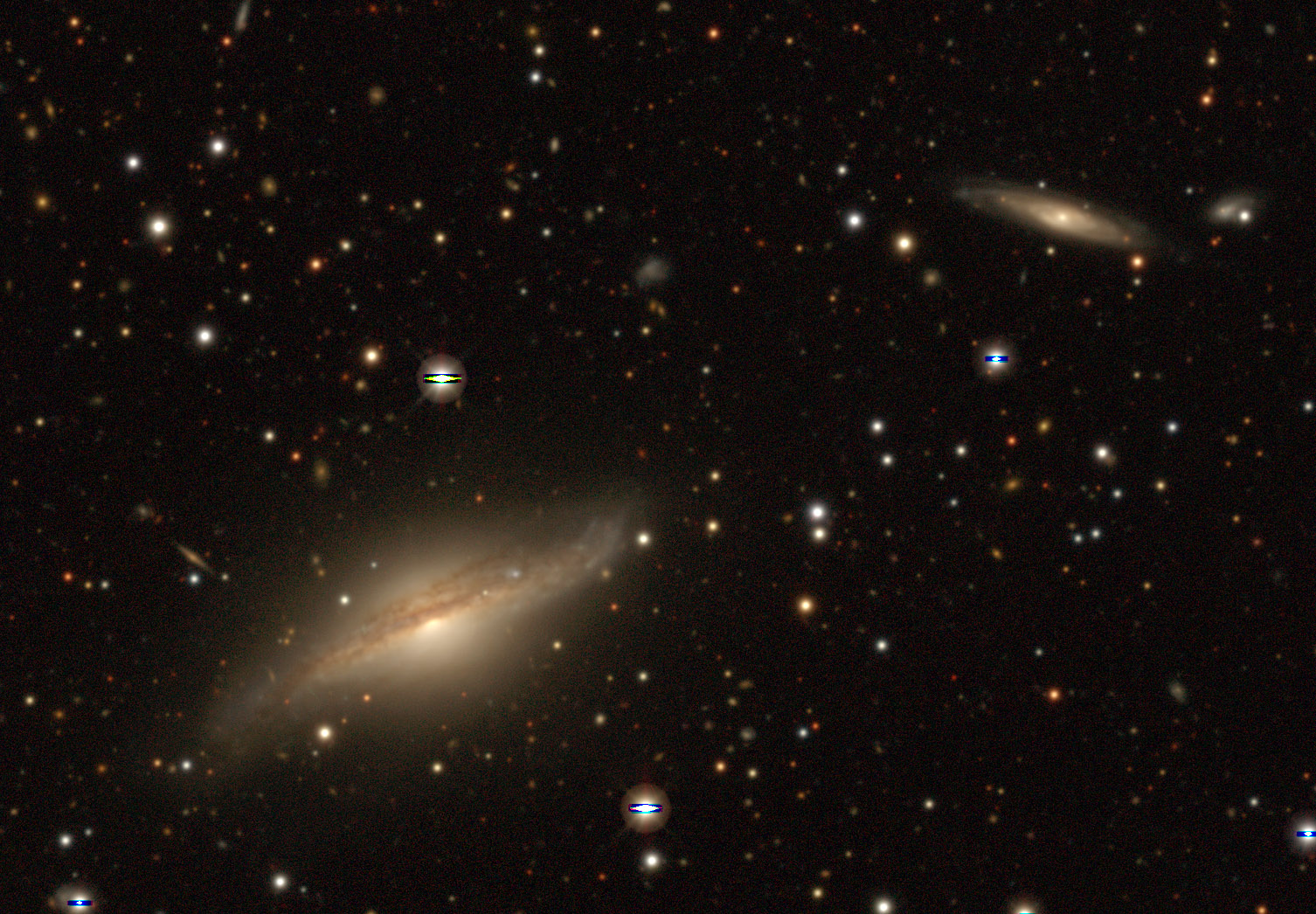
- NGC 6948 imaged by the Legacy Surveys

Observation data (J2000 epoch)
- Constellation: Indus
- Right ascension: 20h 43m 29.14s
- Declination: −53° 21′ 24.2″
- Redshift: 0.010959
- Heliocentric radial velocity: 3,267 km/s
- Apparent magnitude (V): 12.9

Characteristics
- Type: Sa
- Apparent size (V): 2.0′ × 0.95′

Other designations
- PGC 65256, ESO 187-009, AM 2039-533, IRAS 20397-5332

NGC 6948 is a spiral galaxy of morphological type Sa located in the southern constellation of Indus. It was discovered by British astronomer John Herschel on 24 July 1835.

== Characteristics ==
NGC 6948 has an apparent visual magnitude of 12.9, making it a faint object observable with medium to large telescopes. Its apparent dimensions are 2.0 arcminutes by 0.95 arcminutes, and it is oriented at a position angle of 113°.

The galaxy exhibits a redshift (z) of 0.010959, corresponding to a heliocentric radial velocity of approximately 3,267 km/s. This suggests that NGC 6948 is receding from the Milky Way and is located at a considerable distance, estimated to be around 143 million light-years.

== See also ==
- List of NGC objects (6001–7000)
- Indus (constellation)
- Spiral galaxy
