= NGC 6389 =

Galaxy in the constellation Hercules

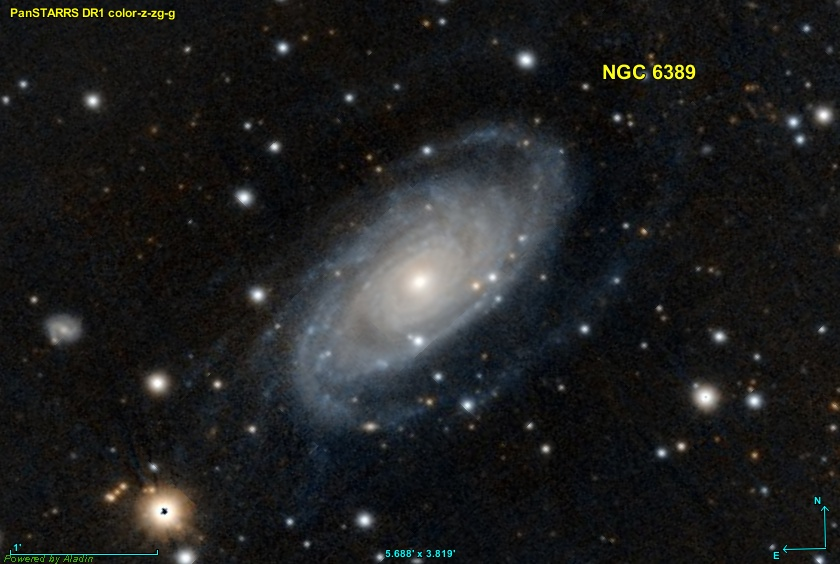
- NGC 6389 imaged by Pan-STARRS

Observation data (J2000 epoch)
- Constellation: Hercules
- Right ascension: 17^{h} 32^{m} 39.7745^{s}
- Declination: +16° 24′ 06.604″
- Redshift: 0.010392±0.00000100
- Heliocentric radial velocity: 3,115±0 km/s
- Distance: 163.60 ± 27.49 Mly (50.160 ± 8.428 Mpc)
- Apparent magnitude (V): 12.82

Characteristics
- Type: Sbc
- Size: ~152,300 ly (46.69 kpc) (estimated)
- Apparent size (V): 2.8′ × 1.9′

Other designations
- IRAS 17304+1626, UGC 10893, MCG +03-45-001, PGC 60466, CGCG 112-005

NGC 6389 is a spiral galaxy in the constellation of Hercules. Its velocity with respect to the cosmic microwave background is 3,071±3 km/s, which corresponds to a Hubble distance of 147.7 ± 10.3 Mly (45.29 ± 3.17 Mpc). However, five non-redshift measurements give a farther mean distance of 163.60 ± 27.49 Mly (50.160 ± 8.428 Mpc). It was discovered by German-British astronomer William Herschel on 29 June 1799.

NGC 6389 is an active galaxy nucleus candidate, i.e. it has a compact region at the center of a galaxy that emits a significant amount of energy across the electromagnetic spectrum, with characteristics indicating that this luminosity is not produced by the stars.

== Supernovae ==
Two supernovae have been observed in NGC 6389:

- SN 1992ab (Type II, mag. 17) was discovered by Jean Mueller on 1 June 1992.
- SN 2000M (Type II, mag. 16.5) was discovered by Marco Migliardi during the Col Druscie Remote Observatory Supernova Search (CROSS), on 27 February 2000.

== See also ==
- List of NGC objects (6001–7000)
