= NGC 6794 =

Galaxy in the constellation Sagittarius

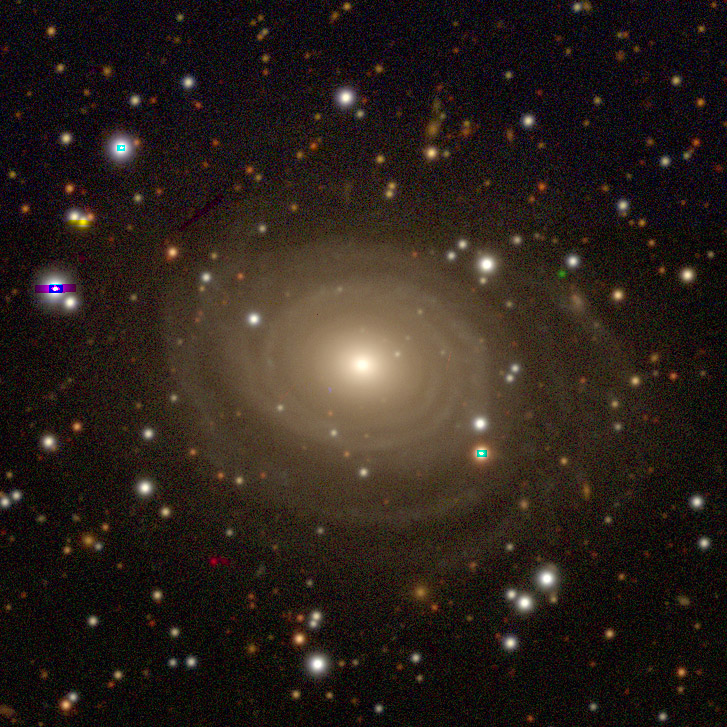
- NGC 6794 imaged by Legacy Surveys

Observation data (J2000 epoch)
- Constellation: Sagittarius
- Right ascension: 19^{h} 28^{m} 03.8849^{s}
- Declination: −38° 55′ 07.297″
- Redshift: 0.020077±0.0000300
- Heliocentric radial velocity: 6,019±9 km/s
- Distance: 315.94 ± 1.96 Mly (96.867 ± 0.601 Mpc)
- Group or cluster: LDC 1344
- Apparent magnitude (V): 13.9

Characteristics
- Type: SA(rs)ab
- Size: ~229,700 ly (70.44 kpc) (estimated)
- Apparent size (V): 1.7′ × 1.5′

Other designations
- ESO 338- G 005, 2MASX J19280388-3855077, MCG -07-40-001, PGC 63241

NGC 6794 is a large spiral galaxy in the constellation of Sagittarius. Its velocity with respect to the cosmic microwave background is 5,887±13 km/s, which corresponds to a Hubble distance of 283.2 ± 19.8 Mly (86.83 ± 6.08 Mpc). However, three non-redshift measurements give a farther mean distance of 315.94 ± 1.96 Mly (96.867 ± 0.601 Mpc). It was discovered by British astronomer John Herschel on 24 August 1834.

NGC 6794 has a possible active galactic nucleus, i.e. it has a compact region at the center of a galaxy that emits a significant amount of energy across the electromagnetic spectrum, with characteristics indicating that this luminosity is not produced by the stars.

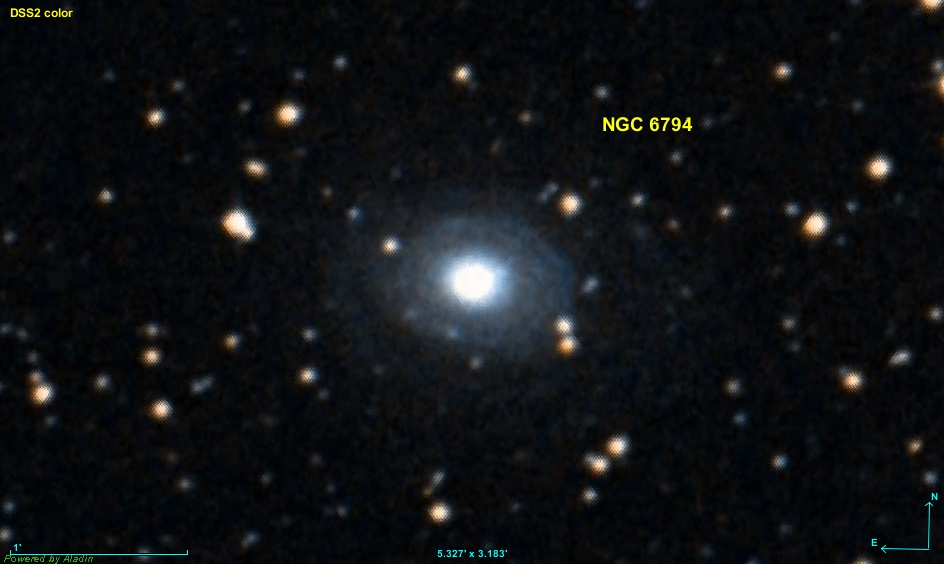
NGC 6794 viewed through visible light

== Galaxy group ==
NGC 6794 is a member of a small galaxy group known as LDC 1344, which includes the galaxies ESO 338-7 and ESO 338-9.

== Supernova ==
One supernova has been observed in NGC 6794:

- SN 2024dgn (Type Ia, mag. 15.719) was discovered by ATLAS on 26 February 2024.

== See also ==
- List of NGC objects (6001–7000)
