= NGC 6061 =

Galaxy in the constellation Hercules

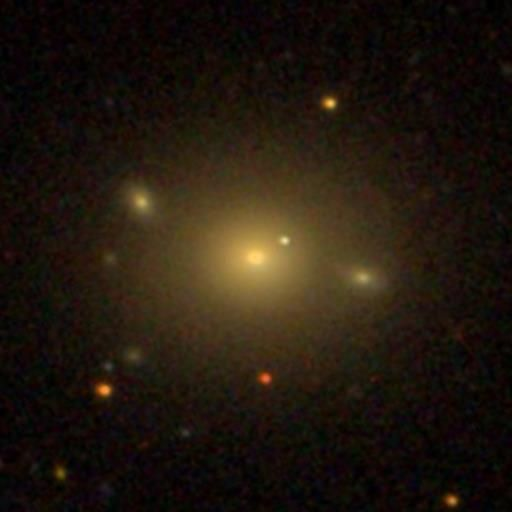
- SDSS image of NGC 6061.

Observation data (J2000 epoch)
- Constellation: Hercules
- Right ascension: 16^{h} 06^{m} 16.0^{s}
- Declination: 18° 15′ 00″
- Redshift: 0.036839
- Heliocentric radial velocity: 11044 km/s
- Distance: 151 Mpc (492 Mly)
- Group or cluster: Hercules Cluster
- Apparent magnitude (V): 14.4

Characteristics
- Type: SA0^-
- Size: ~180,000 ly (54 kpc) (estimated)
- Apparent size (V): 0.98 x 0.81

Other designations
- CGCG 108-145, MCG 3-41-118, PGC 57137, UGC 10199

NGC 6061 is a lenticular galaxy with radio activity located about 490 million light-years away in the constellation Hercules. The galaxy is classified as a head-tail radio galaxy and was discovered by astronomer Lewis Swift on June 8, 1886. NGC 6061 is a member of the Hercules Cluster.

== See also ==
- List of NGC objects (6001–7000)
