= NGC 6862 =

Galaxy in the constellation Telescopium

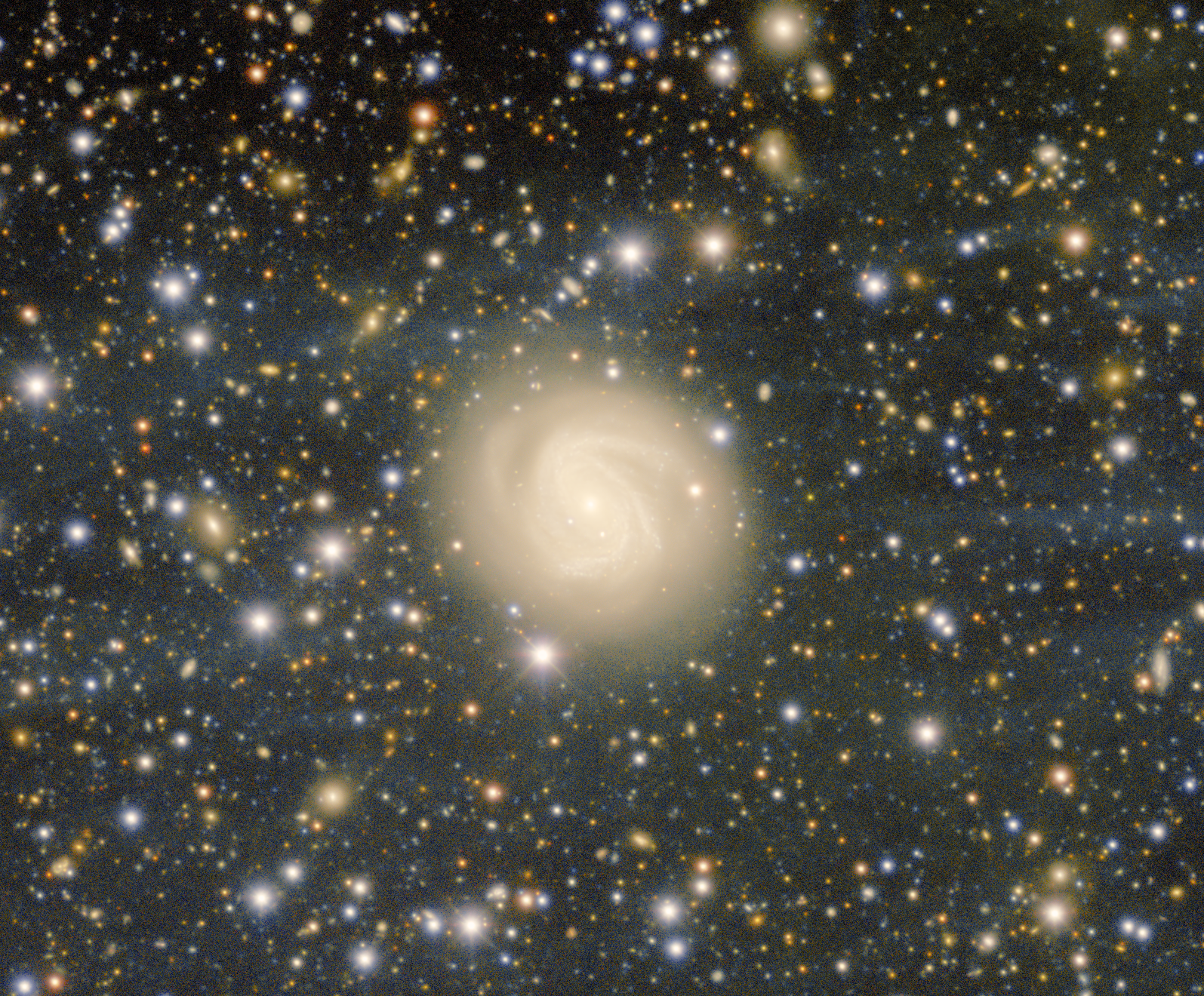
- NGC 6862 imaged by the Dark Energy Camera

Observation data (J2000 epoch)
- Constellation: Telescopium
- Right ascension: 20^{h} 08^{m} 54.5801^{s}
- Declination: −56° 23′ 30.300″
- Redshift: 0.014026±0.0000170
- Heliocentric radial velocity: 4,205±5 km/s
- Distance: 197.3 ± 13.8 Mly (60.48 ± 4.24 Mpc)
- Group or cluster: NGC 5084 group (LGG 429)
- Apparent magnitude (V): 13.44

Characteristics
- Type: SB(rs)b
- Size: ~136,500 ly (41.86 kpc) (estimated)
- Apparent size (V): 1.6′ × 1.1′

Other designations
- ESO 186- G 002, IRAS 20049-5632, 2MASX J20085482-5623318, PGC 64168

NGC 6862 is a barred spiral galaxy in the constellation of Telescopium. Its velocity with respect to the cosmic microwave background is 4,100±9 km/s, which corresponds to a Hubble distance of 197.3 ± 13.8 Mly (60.48 ± 4.24 Mpc). It was discovered by British astronomer John Herschel on 9 July 1834.

NGC 6862 is a Seyfert II galaxy, i.e. it has a quasar-like nucleus with very high surface brightnesses whose spectra reveal strong, high-ionisation emission lines, but unlike quasars, the host galaxy is clearly detectable.

== ESO 185-54 Group ==
NGC 6862 is a member of the ESO 185-54 group (also known as LGG 429). This group contains nine galaxies, including NGC 6848, NGC 6855, NGC 6867, IC 4935, IC 4950, IC 4952, IC 4963, and ESO 185-54.

== Supernova ==
One supernova has been observed in NGC 6862:

- SN 2010co (Type II-P, mag. 16.1) was discovered by Berto Monard on 6 May 2010.

== See also ==
- List of NGC objects (6001–7000)
