= NGC 6754 =

Galaxy in the constellation Telescopium

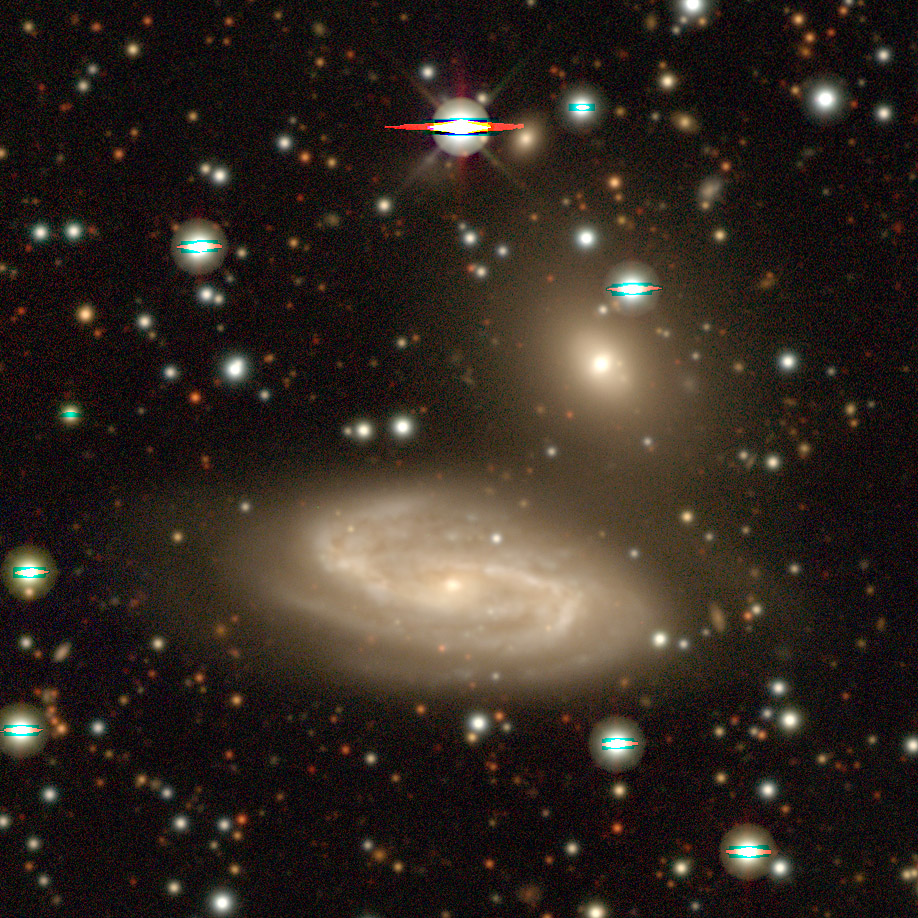
- NGC 6754 imaged by Legacy Surveys

Observation data (J2000 epoch)
- Constellation: Telescopium
- Right ascension: 19^{h} 11^{m} 25.7664^{s}
- Declination: −50° 38′ 31.397″
- Redshift: 0.010864
- Heliocentric radial velocity: 3257 ± 10 km/s
- Distance: 152.8 ± 10.7 Mly (46.84 ± 3.29 Mpc)
- Apparent magnitude (V): 12.1

Characteristics
- Type: SB(rs)b
- Size: ~143,500 ly (43.99 kpc) (estimated)
- Apparent size (V): 1.8′ × 0.9′

Other designations
- ESO 231- G 025, IRAS 19075-5043, 2MASX J19112359-5038309, PGC 62871

NGC 6754 is a barred spiral galaxy in the constellation of Telescopium. Its velocity with respect to the cosmic microwave background is 3176 ± 11 km/s, which corresponds to a Hubble distance of 152.8 ± 10.7 Mly (46.84 ± 3.29 Mpc). Additionally, 10 non-redshift measurements give a closer distance of 137.15 ± 4.19 Mly (42.05 ± 1.285 Mpc). It was discovered by British astronomer John Herschel on 8 July 1834.

According to the SIMBAD database, NGC 6754 is an Active Galaxy Nucleus Candidate, i.e. it has a compact region at the center of a galaxy that emits a significant amount of energy across the electromagnetic spectrum, with characteristics indicating that this luminosity is not produced by the stars.

== Supernovae ==
Four supernovae have been observed in NGC 6754:

- SN 1998X (Type II, mag. 17) was discovered by the Perth Astronomical Research Group on 13 March 1998.
- SN 1998dq (Type Ia, mag. 14.3) was discovered by Brett White on 23 August 1998.
- SN 2000do (Type Ia, mag. 15.6) was discovered by Brett White on 30 September 2000.
- SN 2005cu (Type II, mag. 16.1) was discovered by Berto Monard on 10 July 2005.

== See also ==
- List of NGC objects (6001–7000)
