= NGC 6943 =

Galaxy in the constellation Pavo

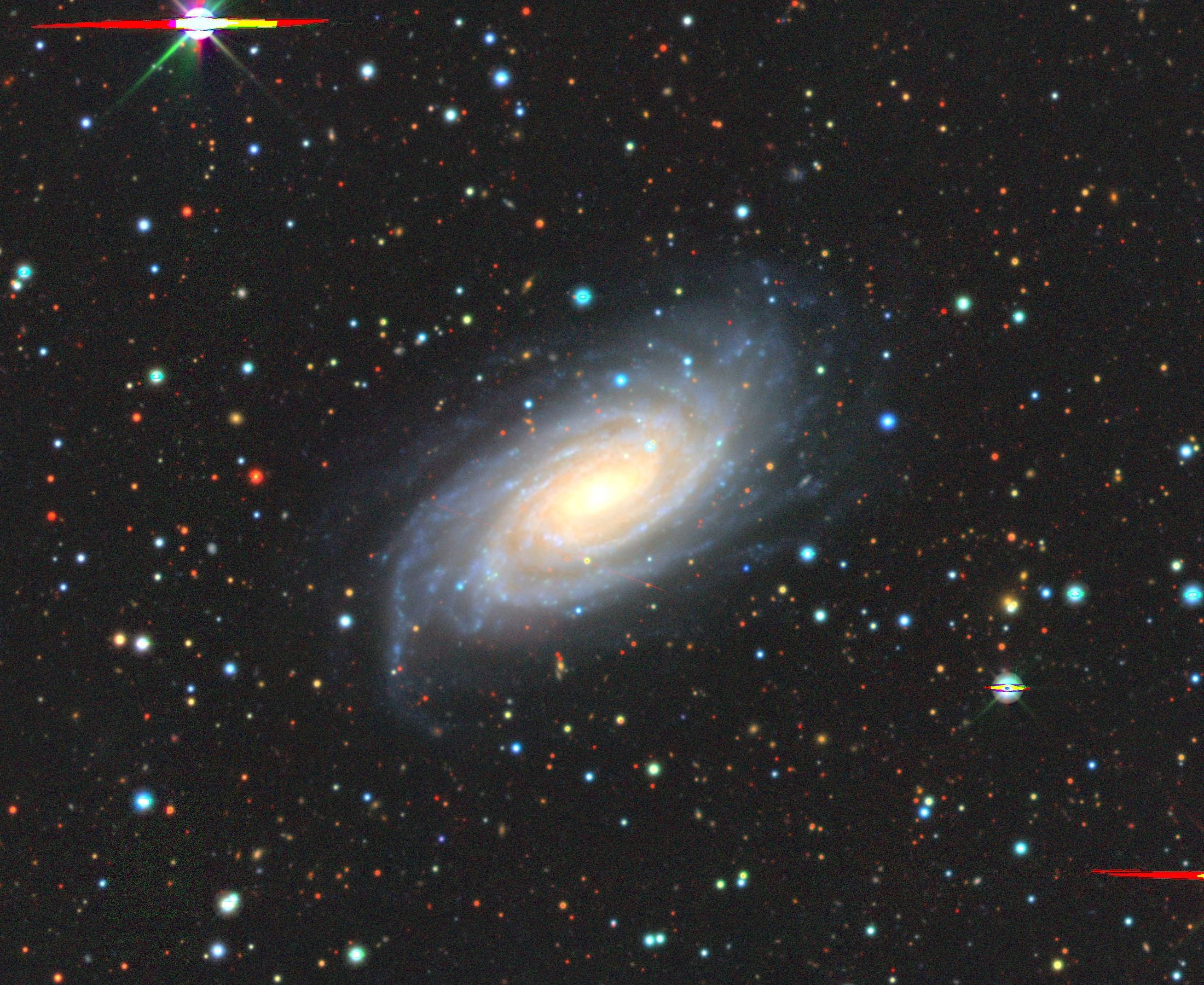
- NGC 6943 imaged by Legacy Surveys

Observation data (J2000 epoch)
- Constellation: Pavo
- Right ascension: 20^{h} 44^{m} 33.7818^{s}
- Declination: −68° 44′ 51.324″
- Redshift: 0.010387±0.0000130
- Heliocentric radial velocity: 3,114±4 km/s
- Distance: 113.08 ± 2.32 Mly (34.671 ± 0.712 Mpc)
- Apparent magnitude (V): 12.05

Characteristics
- Type: SAB(r)cd
- Size: ~173,400 ly (53.15 kpc) (estimated)
- Apparent size (V): 4.0′ × 2.0′

Other designations
- ESO 074- G 006, IRAS 20398-6855, 2MASX J20443374-6844519, PGC 65295

NGC 6943 is a large barred spiral galaxy in the constellation of Pavo. Its velocity with respect to the cosmic microwave background is 3,049±6 km/s, which corresponds to a Hubble distance of 146.7 ± 10.3 Mly (44.97 ± 3.15 Mpc). However, 17 non-redshift measurements give a much closer mean distance of 113.08 ± 2.32 Mly (34.671 ± 0.712 Mpc). It was discovered by British astronomer John Herschel on 27 June 1835.

NGC 6943 has a possible active galactic nucleus, i.e. it has a compact region at the center of a galaxy that emits a significant amount of energy across the electromagnetic spectrum, with characteristics indicating that this luminosity is not produced by the stars.

== Supernovae ==
Two supernovae has been observed in NGC 6943:

- SN 1998ew (Type II, mag. 14) was discovered by Roberto Antezana on 23 November 1998.
- SN 2005av (Type IIn, mag. 15.4) was discovered by Berto Monard on 24 March 2005.

== See also ==
- List of NGC objects (6001–7000)
