= NGC 6850 =

Galaxy in the constellation Telescopium

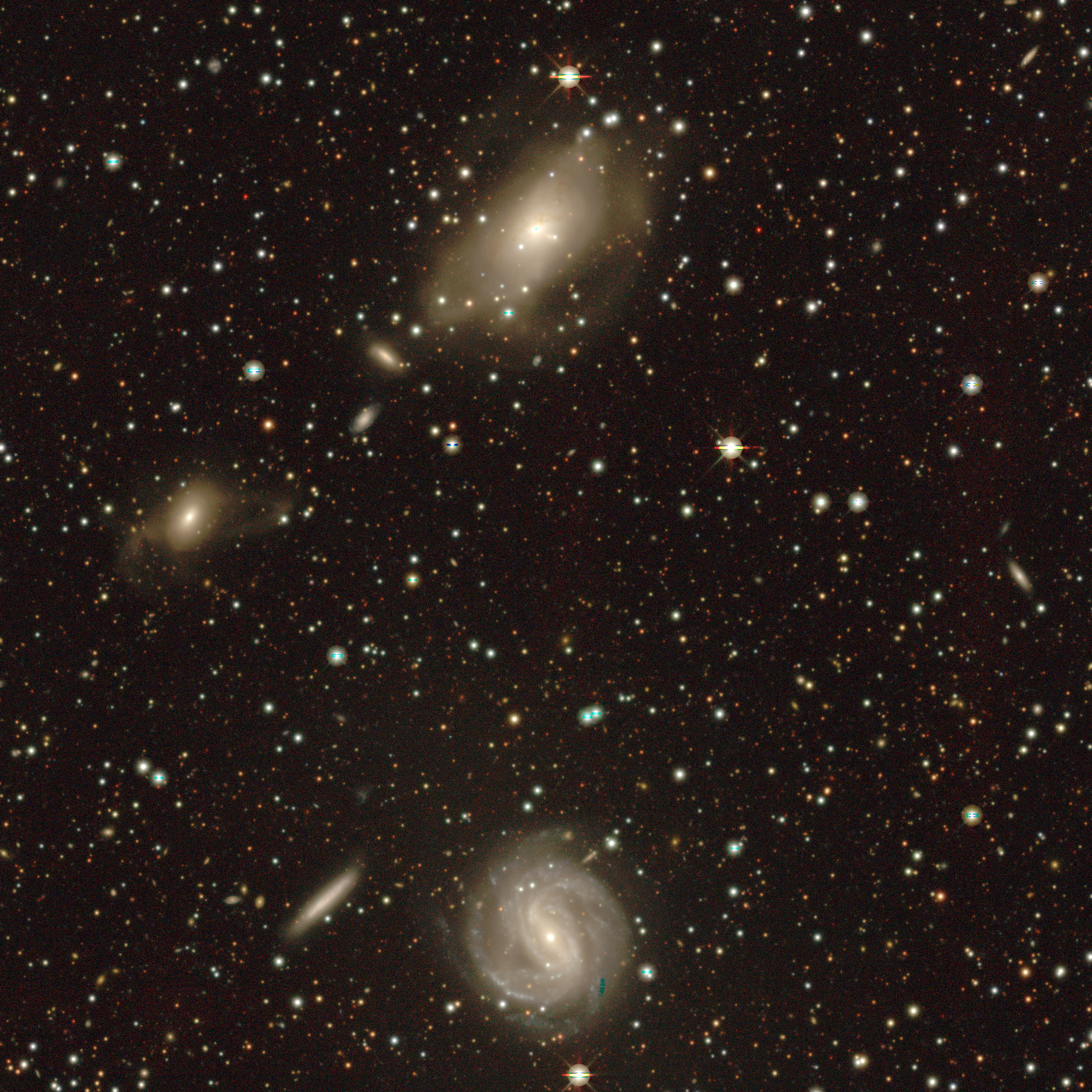
- NGC 6850 (top) and IC 4933 (bottom) imaged by Legacy Surveys

Observation data (J2000 epoch)
- Constellation: Telescopium
- Right ascension: 20^{h} 03^{m} 30.081^{s}
- Declination: −54° 50′ 40.88″
- Redshift: 0.016588
- Heliocentric radial velocity: 4973
- Distance: 234.0 ± 16.4 Mly (71.76 ± 5.04 Mpc)
- Apparent magnitude (V): 13.07
- Apparent magnitude (B): 13.52

Characteristics
- Type: SB0^{+}
- Size: ~188,600 ly (57.84 kpc) (estimated)
- Apparent size (V): 2.1′ × 1.1′

Other designations
- ESO 185- G 056, IRAS F19596-5500, PGC 64043

NGC 6850 is a barred lenticular galaxy in the constellation Telescopium, discovered by John Herschel on 9 June 1836.

== Supernovae ==
Two supernovae have been observed in NGC 6850:

- SN 1984K (type unknown, mag. 16) was discovered by Marina Wischnjewsky on 2 August 1984.
- SN 2025xhz (Type Ia, mag. 18.654) was discovered by ATLAS on 13 September 2025.

== See also ==
- List of NGC objects (6001–7000)
