= NGC 6570 =

Galaxy in the constellation Ophiuchus

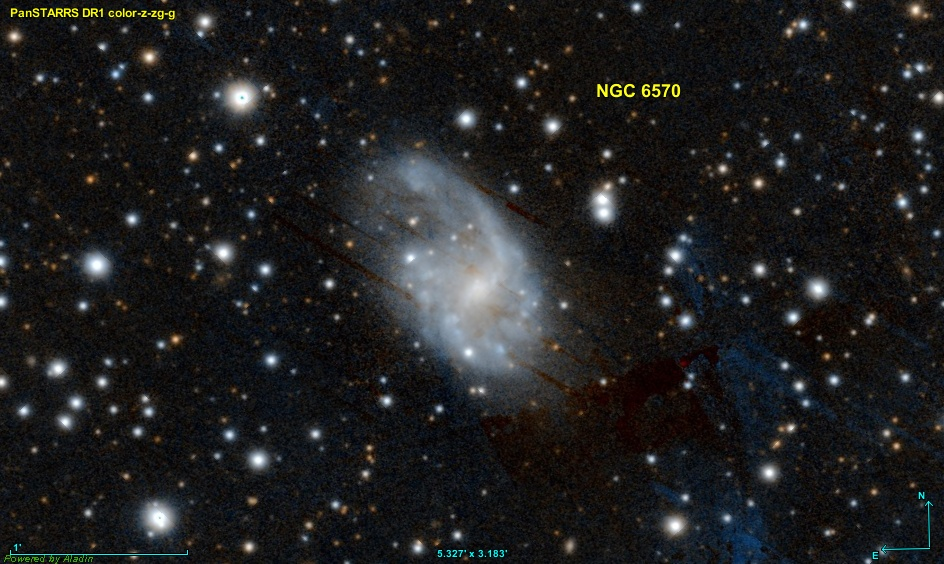

Observation data (J2000.0 epoch)
- Constellation: Ophiuchus
- Right ascension: 18^{h} 11^{m} 07^{s}
- Declination: +14° 05′ 34″
- Apparent magnitude (B): 13.2

Characteristics
- Type: Sc/I D ~

Other designations
- NGC 6570, IRAS 18088+1404, 2MASX J18110729+1405352, UGC 11137

NGC 6570 is a spiral galaxy in the constellation of Ophiuchus. It is part of the original New General Catalogue.
