= NGC 6566 =

Elliptical galaxy in the constellation Draco

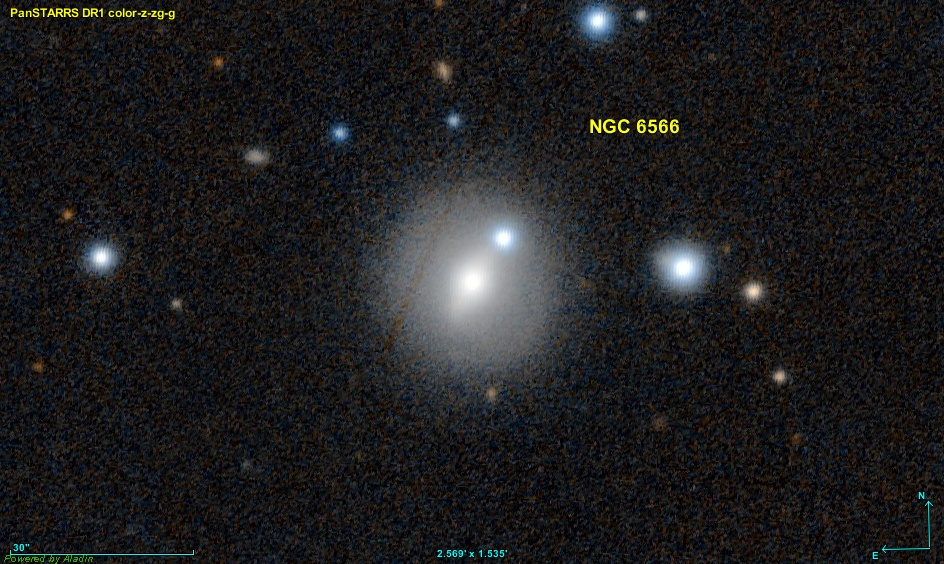

Observation data (J2000 epoch)
- Constellation: Draco
- Right ascension: 18^{h} 07^{m} 00.65042^{s}
- Declination: +52° 15′ 36.6716″
- Redshift: 0.01768
- Heliocentric radial velocity: 5252 km/s
- Distance: 250.6 ± 17.7 Mly (76.84 ± 5.43 Mpc)
- Apparent magnitude (B): 15.47

Characteristics
- Type: cE

Other designations
- MCG +09-30-001, PGC 61418

NGC 6566 is a compact elliptical galaxy within the constellation Draco. It is located about 250 million light-years (80 Mpc) away from the Sun. It was discovered on October 27, 1861 by the astronomer Heinrich d'Arrest.
