= NGC 6956 =

Galaxy in the constellation Delphinus

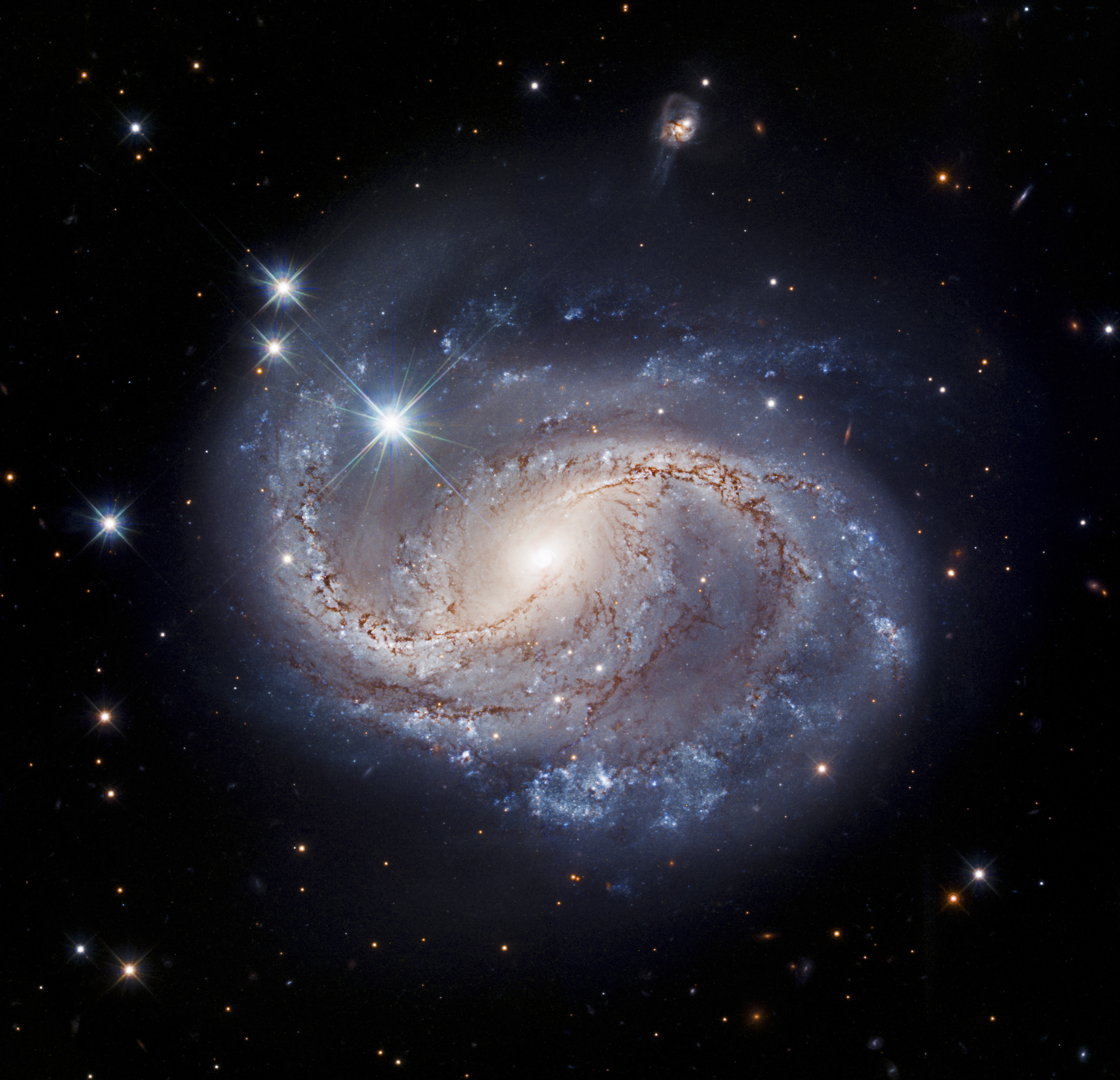
- NGC 6956 imaged by the Hubble Space Telescope

Observation data (J2000 epoch)
- Constellation: Delphinus
- Right ascension: 20^{h} 43^{m} 53.7237^{s}
- Declination: +12° 30′ 42.856″
- Redshift: 0.015561
- Heliocentric radial velocity: 4629 km/s
- Apparent magnitude (B): 13.5

Characteristics
- Type: SBb
- Size: 153,700 ly (47.15 kpc) (estimated)

Other designations
- IRAS 20415+1219, 2MASX J20435368+1230429, NGC 6956, UGC 11619, MCG +02-53-001, PGC 65269

NGC 6956 is a barred spiral galaxy located in the constellation Delphinus. It is located at a distance of about 214 million light-years from Earth. Friedrich Wilhelm Herschel discovered this galaxy on 9 October 1784.

== Supernovae ==
Three supernovae have been observed in NGC 6956:

- SN 2006it (Type II-P, mag. 17.6) was discovered by Lick Observatory Supernova Search (LOSS) on 1 October 2006.
- SN 2013fa (Type Ia, mag. 16.2) was discovered by Kōichi Itagaki on 25 August 2013.
- PSN J20435314+1230304 (Type Ia, mag. 15.8) was discovered by Massimo Caimmi of the Italian Supernovae Search Project (ISSP) on 11 July 2015.
