= NGC 6090 =

Two interacting galaxies in the constellation Draco

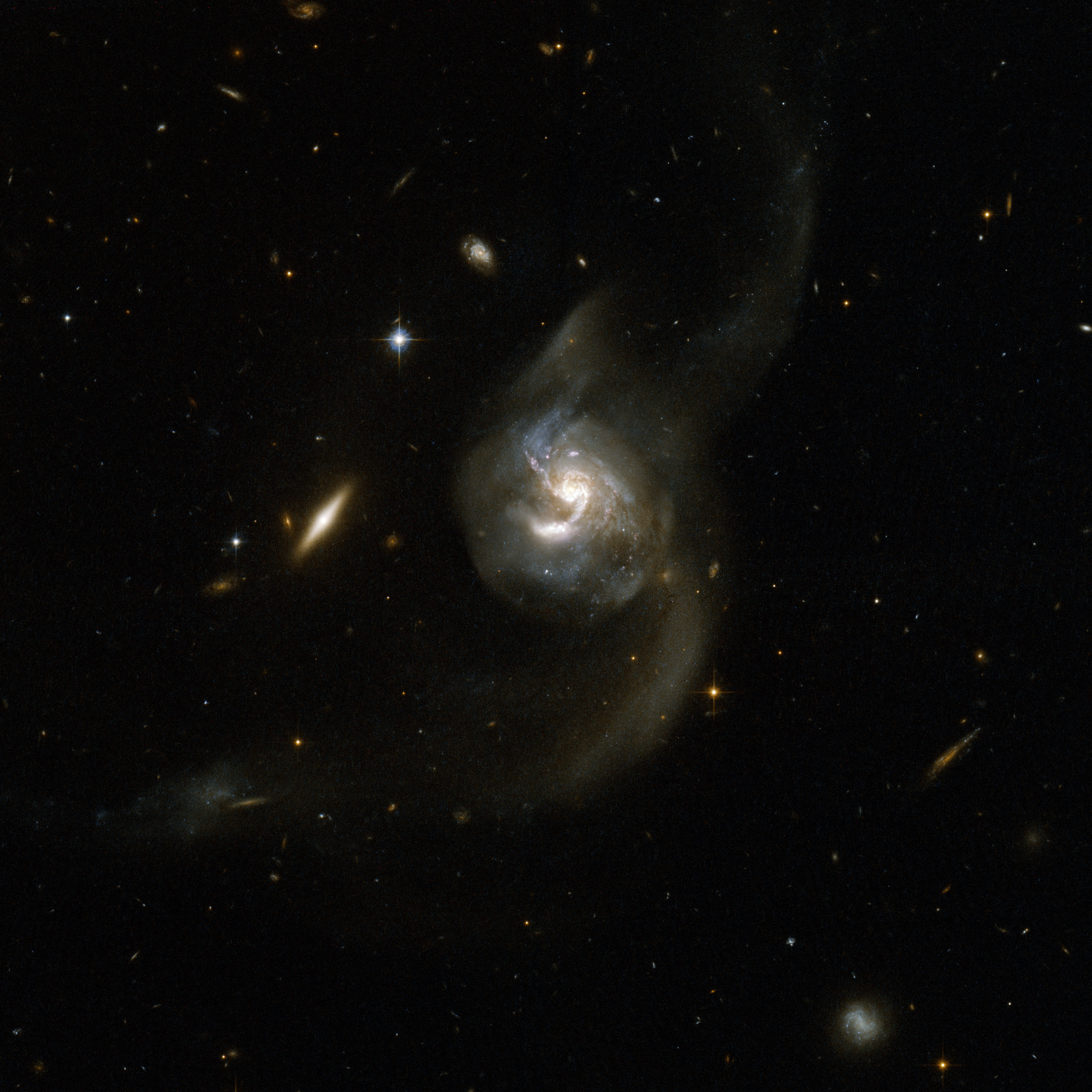
- NGC 6090

Observation data (J2000 epoch)
- Constellation: Draco
- Right ascension: 16^{h} 11^{m} 40.70^{s}
- Declination: 52° 27′ 24.0″
- Redshift: 0.029304
- Distance: 400 million light years
- Apparent magnitude (V): 14.00

Characteristics
- Type: S0?
- Apparent size (V): 36" x 18"

Other designations
- UGC 10267, Markarian 496, VV 626, Zw I 135, PGC 57437

NGC 6090 is a merging pair of spiral galaxies, 400 million light-years from the Earth, in the constellation of Draco. The cores of the two galaxies are around 10,000 light-years apart from each other, meaning that the merger is likely at its intermediate stage. Two large "tails", made of galactic material gravitationally ejected during the merger, have formed outside the main galaxies. Newly formed stars can be seen in the overlapping area.
