= NGC 6999 =

Lenticular galaxy in the constellation of Microscopium

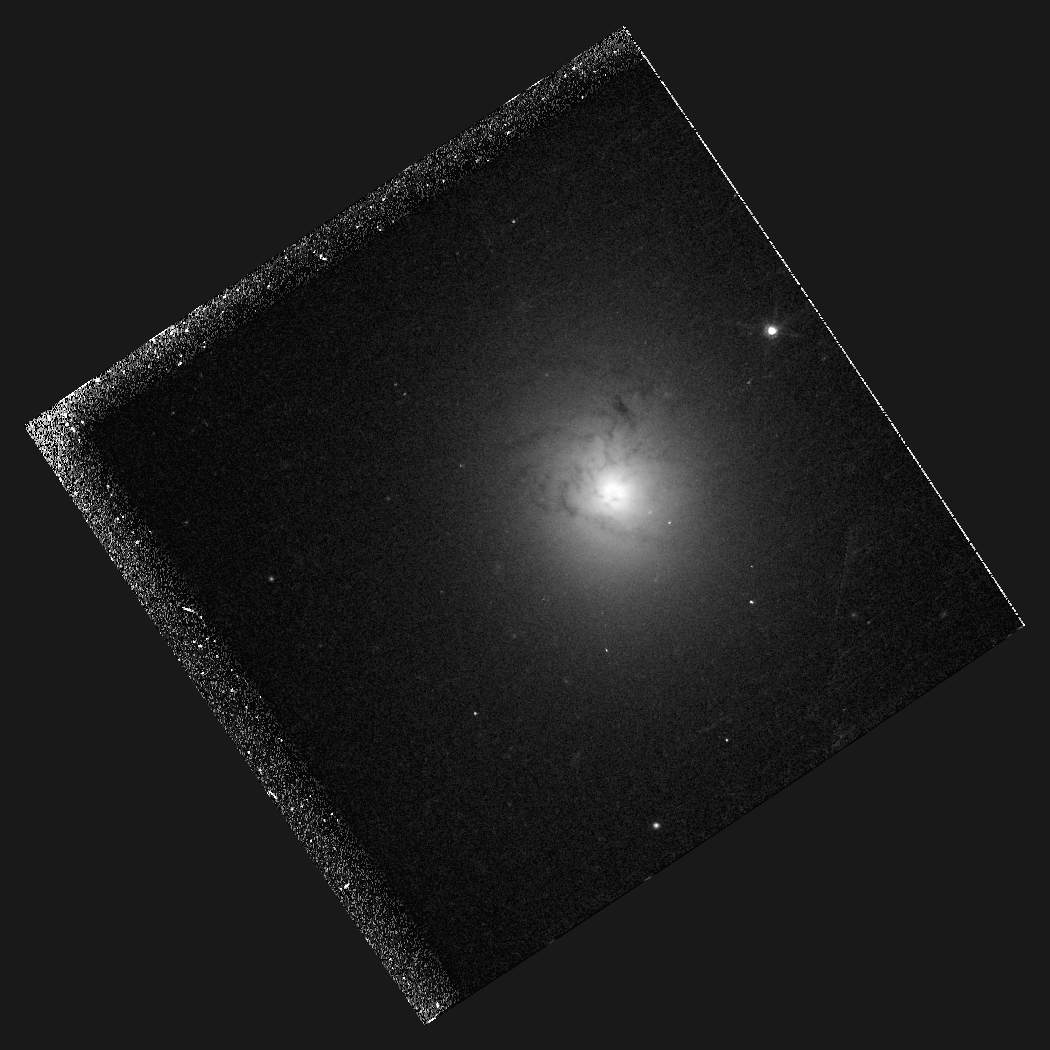
- NGC 6999

Observation data (J2000 epoch)
- Constellation: Microscopium
- Right ascension: 21h 03m 30s
- Declination: -27° 57’ 27”
- Distance: 524.9 million ly
- Apparent magnitude (B): 15.02
- magnitude (J): 11.51
- magnitude (H): 10.74
- magnitude (K): 10.44

Characteristics
- Type: Lenticular galaxy

Other designations
- PGC 65940

NGC 6999 is a S0 morphology type lenticular galaxy located 524.9 million light years from Earth in the constellation of Microscopium.

It was discovered by Albert Marth on October 19th 1864.
