= NGC 6606 =

Spiral galaxy in the constellation Lyra

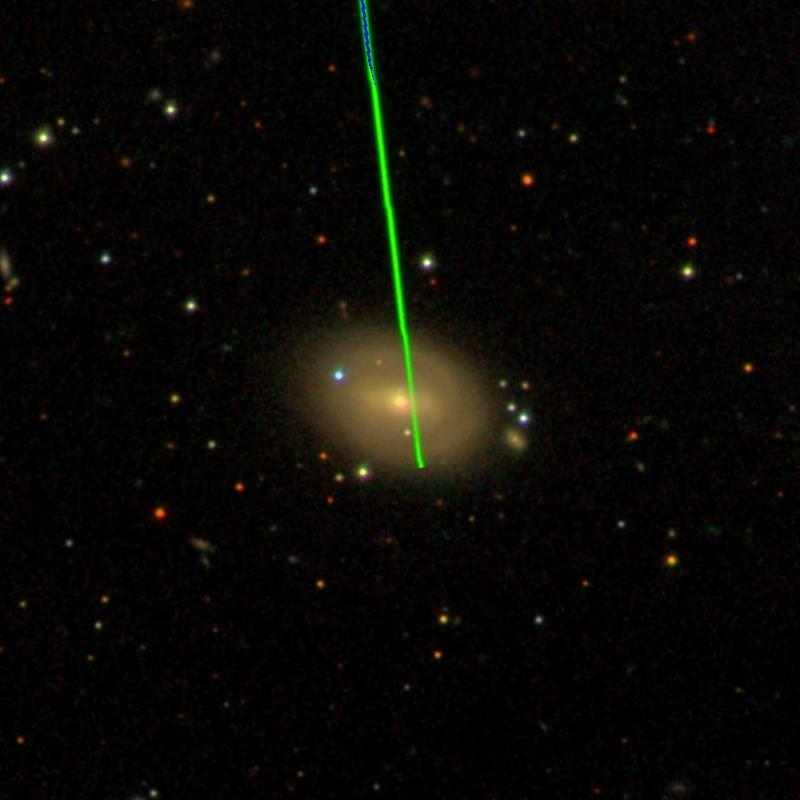
- An image of NGC 6606 from the Sloan Digital Sky Survey

Observation data (J2000 epoch)
- Constellation: Lyra
- Right ascension: 18^{h} 14^{m} 41.6138^{s}
- Declination: +43° 16′ 07.318″
- Redshift: 5773 ± 33 km/s

Characteristics
- Type: G

Other designations
- CGCG 227-021

NGC 6606 (also known as UGC 11174 and PGC 61633) is a spiral galaxy located in the constellation Lyra. Its velocity with respect to the cosmic microwave background is 5670 ± 34 km/s, which corresponds to a Hubble distance of 83.63 ± 5.90 Mpc (~272.9 million light-years). It was originally discovered on 8 August 1883 by the French astronomer, Édouard Stephan. NGC 6606 is situated north of the celestial equator and, as such, it is more easily visible from the northern hemisphere. Given its visual magnitude of 14.4, NGC 6606 is visible with a telescope having an aperture of 14 inches (350mm) or more.
