= NGC 6375 =

Galaxy in the constellation Hercules

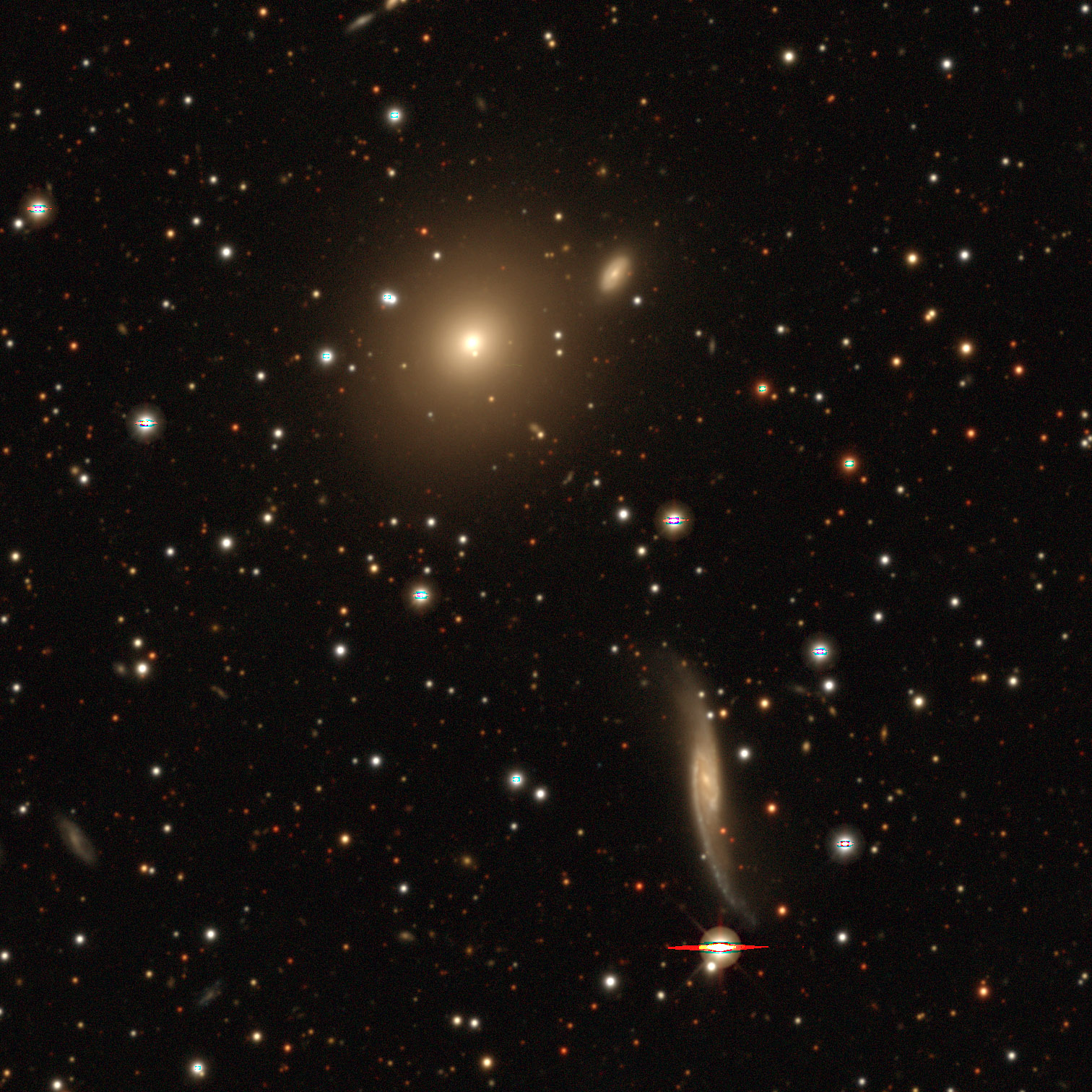
- NGC 6375 (top) & UGC 10873 (bottom)

Observation data (J2000 epoch)
- Constellation: Hercules
- Right ascension: 17^{h} 29^{m} 21.877^{s}
- Declination: +16° 12′ 24.47″
- Redshift: 0.020201
- Heliocentric radial velocity: 5995 km/s
- Apparent magnitude (B): 14.5

Characteristics
- Type: E

Other designations
- UGC 10875, MCG +03-44-009, PGC 60384

NGC 6375 is a galaxy in the New General Catalog. It is located in the sky within the constellation Hercules. It is an E0 type lenticular, elliptical galaxy. It was discovered by German astronomer Albert Marth in 1864 with a mirror type telescope with a diameter of 121.92 cm (48 inches).

The stellar velocity in the galaxy's core is 226 km/s, suggesting the presence of a central supermassive black hole with a mass of c. 300 million Sun masses. The galaxy is part of the MASSIVE Survey, a volume-limited study focused on determining the relationship between the mass of a galaxy's central black hole, stellar mass and dark matter halo.
