= NGC 6863 =

Asterism in the constellation Aquila

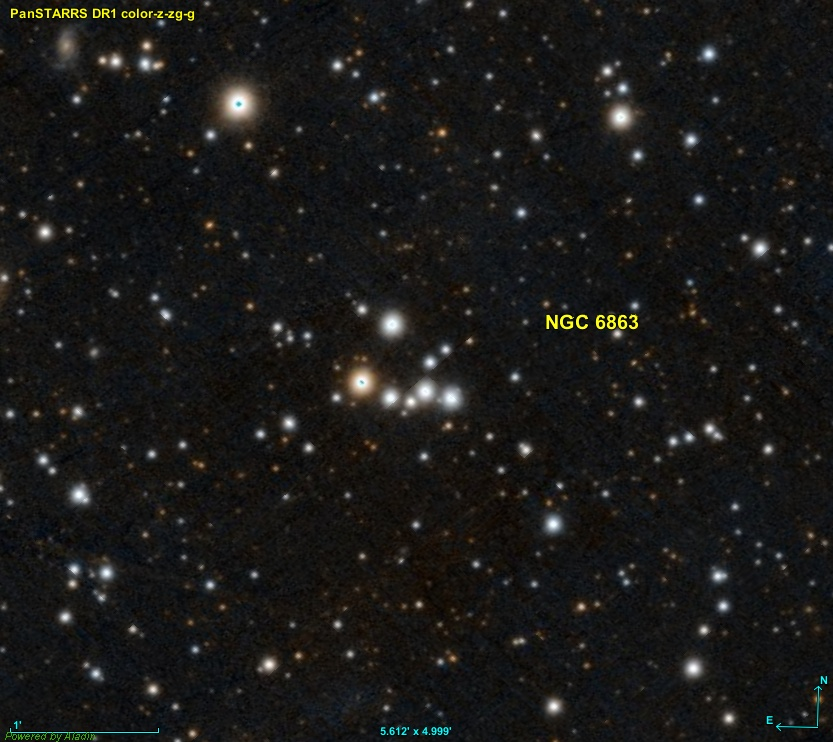
- NGC 6863 imaged by Pan-STARRS

Observation data (J2000 epoch)
- Right ascension: 20^{h} 05^{m} 07.3^{s}
- Declination: −03° 33′ 16″

Physical characteristics

Associations
- Constellation: Aquila

NGC 6863 is an asterism in the constellation Aquila. The celestial object was found on July 25, 1827, by the British astronomer John Herschel.

In 2009 an astronomical study by Bidin et al. concluded that whereas the small group of stars in Aquila had been classified as an OCR (Open Cluster Remnant i.e. the dispersed remains of a group of physically related stars) they were in fact an asterism, a group of unrelated stellar bodies.

== See also ==
- List of NGC objects
