= NGC 6790 =

Young planetary nebula in the constellation Aquila

Emission nebula
- Planetary nebula
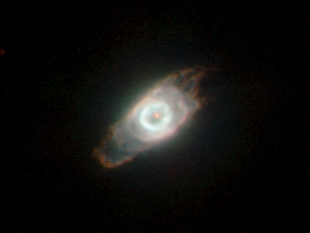
- Hubble Space Telescope image of NGC 6790

Observation data: J2000 epoch
- Right ascension: 19^{h} 22^{m} 56.966^{s}
- Declination: +1° 30′ 46.46″
- Distance: 19 kly (5.7 kpc) ly
- Apparent magnitude (V): 10.45
- Apparent dimensions (V): 4″ × 3″
- Constellation: Aquila
- Designations: BD+01 3979, HD 182083, NSV 11959

NGC 6790 is a young, compact planetary nebula with a high surface brightness located in the equatorial constellation of Aquila. Imaging by the Hubble Space Telescope shows elongated shells surrounding the central star. The distance to this nebula is poorly known, but is estimated at 19 kilolight-years, and it is roughly 6,000 years old. The expansion velocity of the neutral hydrogen component is in the range 15−19 km s^{−1}. The central star is a white dwarf with a temperature of around 73,500 K and a photographic magnitude of 11.1. It has a mass of 0.6 M_{☉}, having evolved from a star with a mass about the same as the Sun.
