= NGC 6881 =

Planetary nebula in the constellation Cygnus

Emission nebula
- Planetary nebula
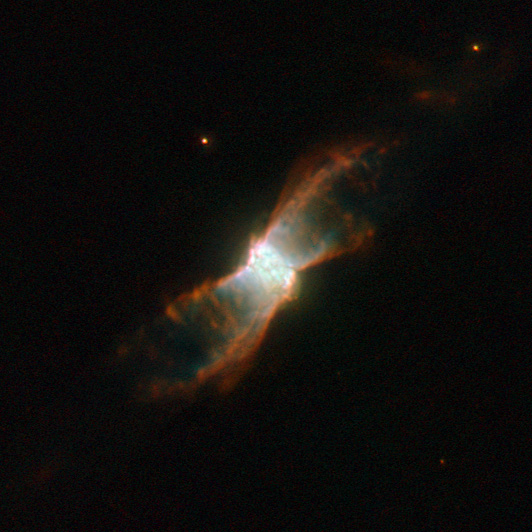
- The butterfly-like planetary nebula NGC 6881 is visible here in an image taken by the NASA/ESA Hubble Space Telescope

Observation data: J2000 epoch
- Right ascension: 20^{h} 10^{m} 52.45^{s}
- Declination: +37° 24′ 42.4″
- Distance: 5200 ± 1600 ly (1600 ± 500 pc)
- Apparent magnitude (V): 13.700 B
- Constellation: Cygnus
- Designations: GSC2 N033220122825, 2MASS J20105244+3724424, PN VV 250, CSI+37-20091, Hen 2-456, PK 074+02 1, PN ARO 108, GCRV 12543, IRAS 20090+3715, PN G074.5+02.1, PN VV' 526

NGC 6881 is a planetary nebula, located in the constellation of Cygnus. It is formed of an inner nebula, estimated to be about one fifth of a light-year across, and a symmetrical structure that spreads out about one light-year from one tip to the other. The symmetry could be due to a binary star at the nebula's centre.
