= NGC 6702 =

Elliptical galaxy in the constellation Lyra

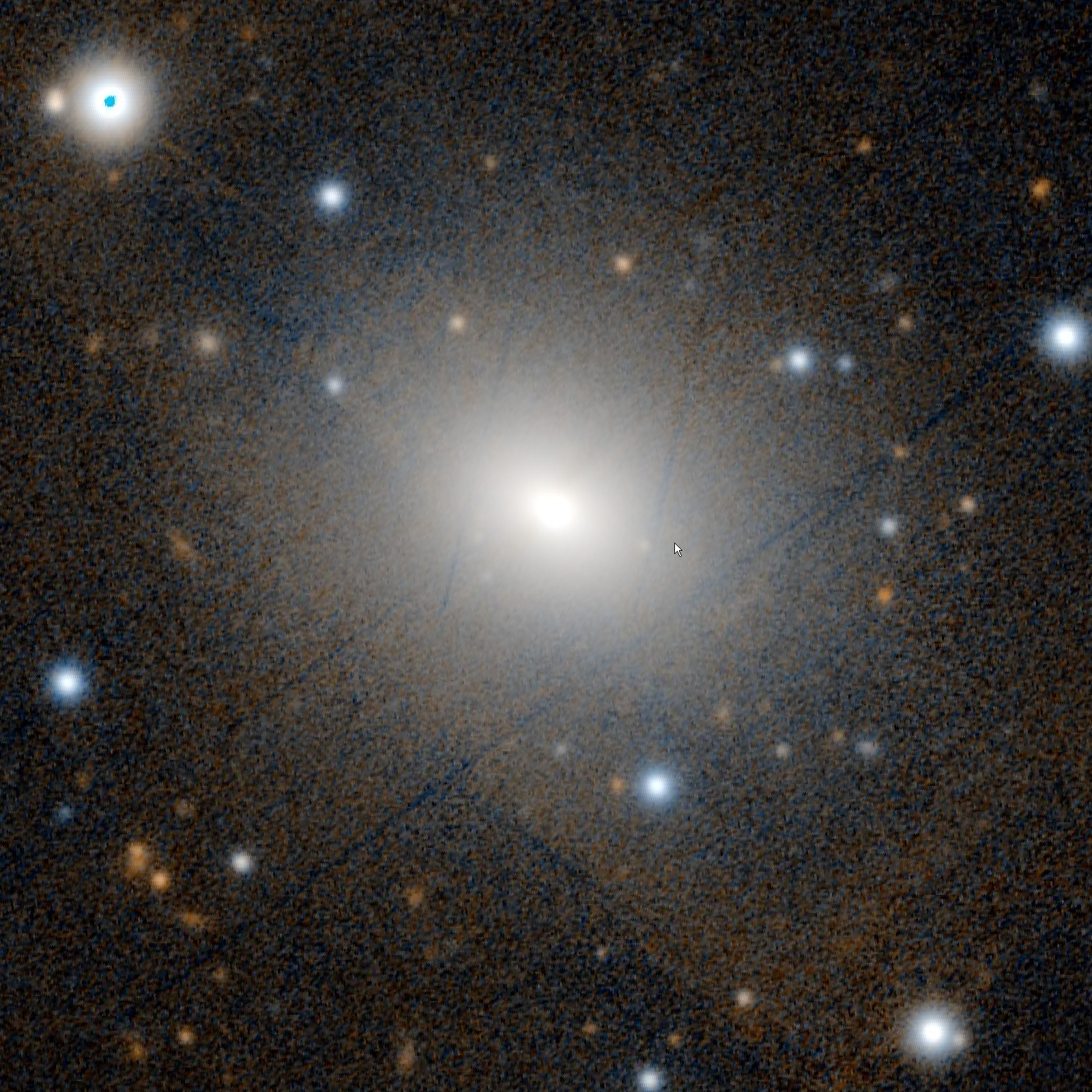

Observation data (J2000.0 epoch)
- Constellation: Lyra
- Right ascension: 18^{h} 46^{m} 57,6^{s}
- Declination: +45° 42′ 20″
- Redshift: 0.015771
- Heliocentric radial velocity: 4728 ± 5
- Distance: 217 million LY
- Apparent magnitude (V): 12.2

Characteristics
- Type: E
- Apparent size (V): 1.90 x 1.5

Other designations
- PGC 62395

NGC 6702 (also known as UGC 11354) is an elliptical galaxy in the constellation Lyra. It was first discovered by Heinrich d'Arrest in 1863. The galaxy's radial velocity, relative to the cosmic microwave background is measured at around 4592 ± 11 km/s, corresponding to a Hubble distance of around 67.73 ± 4.74 MPC. Many amateur astronomers believe NGC 6702 and NGC 6703 are a pair, even though they are separated by 100 million light-years.

== Supernova ==
One supernova has been observed within the galaxy NGC 6702:

- SN 2002cs (type Ia, mag. 16.3) was discovered by Mark Armstrong on May 5, 2002.
