= NGC 6884 =

Planetary nebula in the constellation of Cygnus

Emission nebula
- Planetary nebula
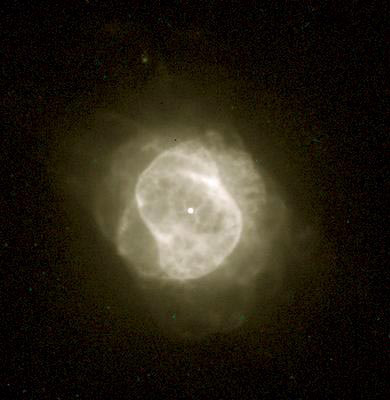
- Hubble Space Telescope (HST) image of NGC 6884

Observation data: J2000 epoch
- Right ascension: 20^{h} 10^{m} 23.64012^{s}
- Declination: +46° 27′ 39.5478″
- Distance: 12.5 kly (3.830 kpc) ly
- Apparent dimensions (V): 0.127′
- Constellation: Cygnus

Physical characteristics
- Radius: 0.23 ly
- Designations: PNG 082.1+07.0, NGC 6766

NGC 6884 is a planetary nebula located in the constellation Cygnus, less than a degree to the southwest of the star Ο^{1} Cygni. It lies at a distance of approximately 12.5 kly from the Sun. The nebula was discovered on May 8, 1883, by American astronomer Edward C. Pickering.

This nebula consists of the cast-off outer atmosphere of an aging star. It is young and compact with a kinematic age of 720 years. The nebula is point-symmetric with arcs forming an S-shaped inner core; the shape is likely explained by bipolar outflows with a velocity of 55 km/s. The core is surrounded by a filamentary ring structure that is inclined at an angle of around 40–45° to the line of sight from the Earth. The core has an overall shape of a prolate ellipsoid with axis ratios of 1.6:1 and is inclined by 40°. The expansion velocity of the nebula ranges over 19–25 km/s. The central star has a temperature of ~100,000 K and a class of WN b?.
