= UGC 12158 =

Galaxy in the constellation Pegasus

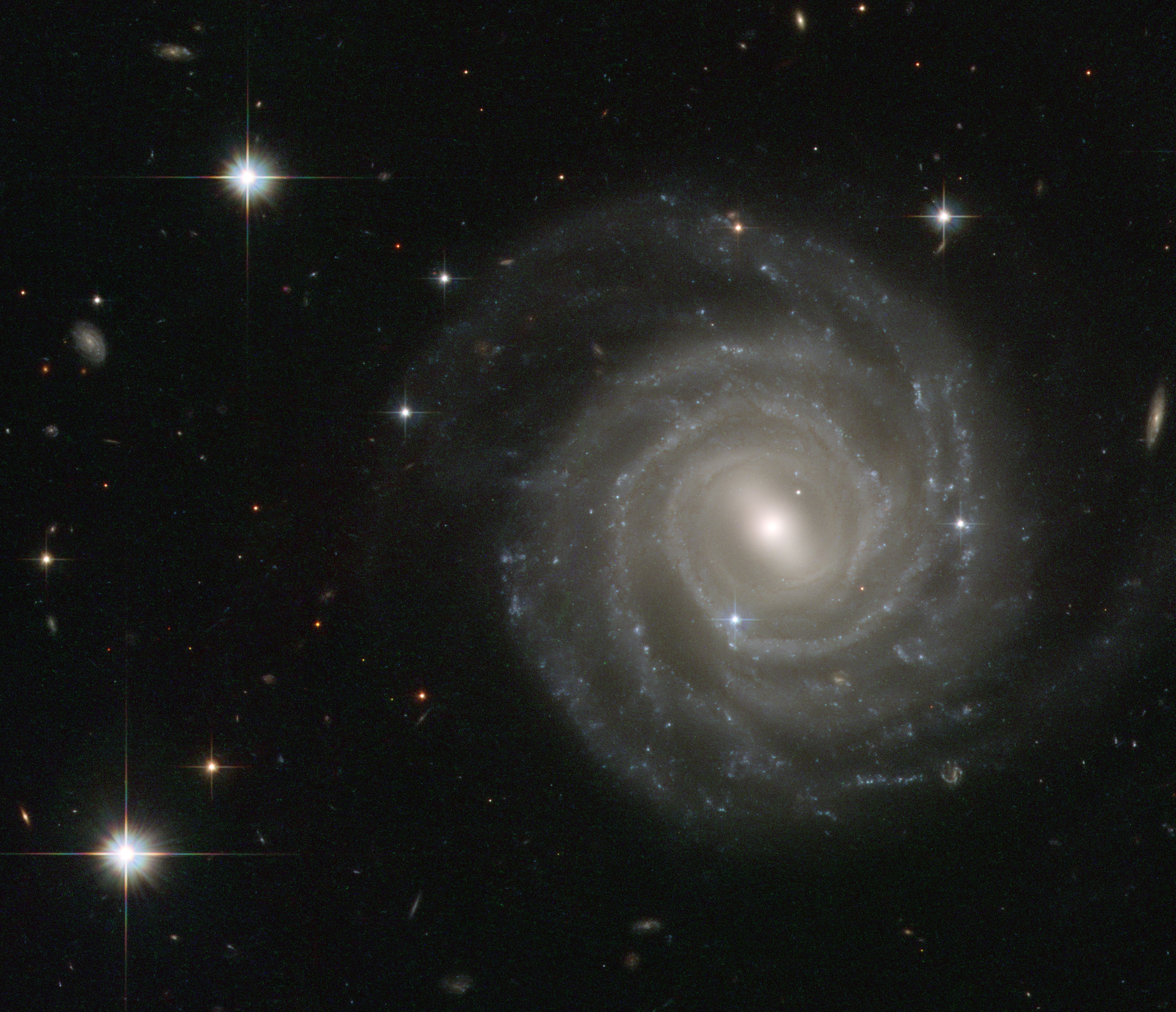
- Barred spiral galaxy UGC 12158 imaged by the Hubble Space Telescope

Observation data (J2000 epoch)
- Constellation: Pegasus
- Right ascension: 22^{h} 42^{m} 10.5150^{s}
- Declination: +19° 59′ 48.900″
- Redshift: 0.031000
- Heliocentric radial velocity: 9294 ± 5 km/s
- Distance: 386.11 ± 9.45 Mly (118.383 ± 2.896 Mpc)
- Apparent magnitude (V): 14.5
- Apparent magnitude (B): 15.3

Characteristics
- Type: Sb
- Size: 216,100 ly (66.29 kpc) (estimated)
- Apparent size (V): 1.2′ × 1.1′

Other designations
- GALEXASC J224210.44+195949.5, 2MASX J22421049+1959492, MCG +03-57-032, PGC 69533, CGCG 452-045, SDSS J224210.53+195948.8

UGC 12158 or PGC 69533 is an Sb-type barred spiral galaxy located approximately 386,000,000 ly (118 Mpc) away from Earth in the constellation of Pegasus. Its tight spiral disk spans approximately 216,000 ly (66 kpc), whose scale at heliocentric distance is about 36.9 kiloparsecs per arcminute. It is also often stated to resemble the Milky Way in appearance, with a similar central bar and spiral arm structure. The earliest known reference to this galaxy comes from part 2 of the Morphological Catalogue of Galaxies, published in 1964, where it is listed as MCG +03-57-032.

== Supernova ==
On 4 September 2004, Tom Boles discovered a 18.5v magnitude Type Ia supernova on one of the spiral arms near the apparent centre in UGC 12158. It was independently discovered by Mark Armstrong the following day, and subsequently designated SN 2004ef. (Blue star within UGC 12158 in Starbox Hubble's Space Telescope image.) Optical spectra was obtained on 7 September 2004 confirming the Type I classification. It reached 17.0v magnitude on 9 September 2004 before fading from view. No progenitor star was found on earlier survey images.

== Image gallery ==
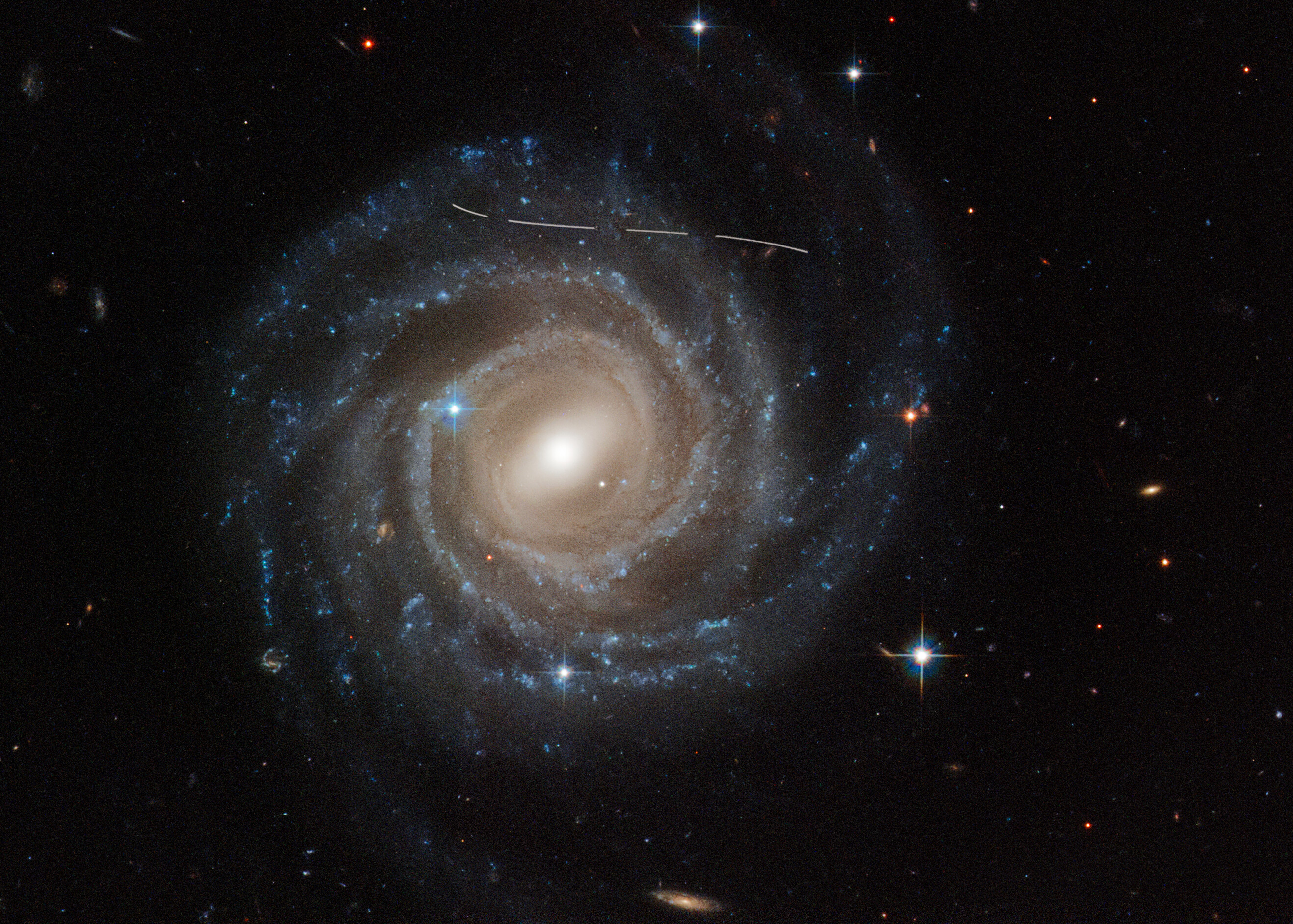
UGC 12158 imaged by the Hubble Space Telescope. The lines are a foreground asteroid moving through the field of view.

== See also ==
- NGC 2336 - another spiral galaxy of similar size and shape
- NGC 1232
- NGC 6744
- SPT0418-47 - a spiral galaxy of similar size and shape when universe was 1.4 billion years old
- UGC 6093 - a similar barred spiral galaxy
- Milky Way - the galaxy it resembles
