= SN 2005hk =

Type Iax supernova

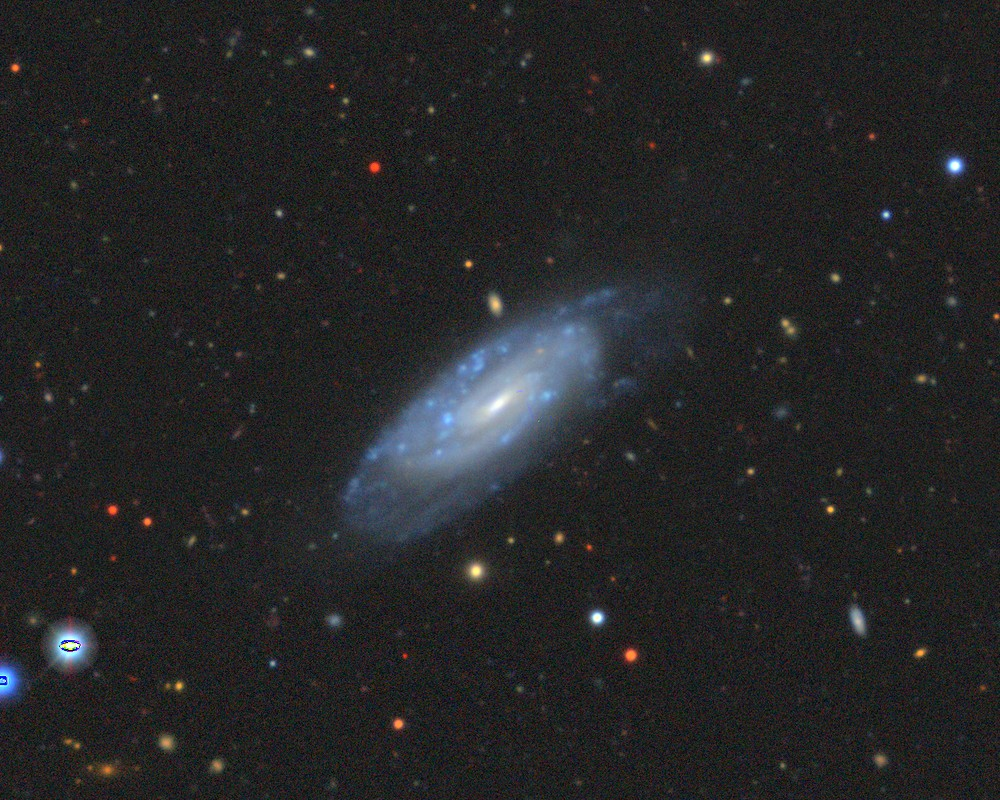
- Host galaxy UGC 272 imaged by Legacy Surveys
- Event type: Supernova
- Type Iax
- Date: 30 October 2005 by J. Burket and W. Li
- Instrument: SDSS
- Constellation: Cetus
- Right ascension: 00^{h} 27^{m} 50.89^{s}
- Declination: −01° 11′ 53.3″
- Epoch: J2000
- Distance: 185.1 Mly (56.75 Mpc)
- Redshift: 0.012993±0.000041
- Host: UGC 272

SN 2005hk was a peculiar Type Iax supernova in UGC 272, which is a barred spiral galaxy in the equatorial constellation of Cetus. This galaxy is around 185.1 million light-years (56.75 Mpc) from Earth. The supernova was discovered on 30 October 2005.

== Observations ==
This event was discovered by J. Burket and W. Li on 30 October 2005. At magnitude 17.5, it was located 17.2″ east and 6.9″ north of the UGC 272 nucleus. This supernova was independently discovered on images taken with the SDSS telescope dated October 28. The event was not observed on images taken two days earlier.

The early spectra of SN 2005hk appeared peculiar, with prominent lines of double-ionized iron and only weak lines of intermediate mass elements. It was similar to SN 2002cx, with an unusually slow photospheric velocity of 6,000 km/s. These peculiarities could not be readily explained as the result of a large asymmetry in the explosion. It was under-luminous for a Type Ia supernova, reaching peak light on November 9 with a near-normal spectrum for a supernova of this type. The later spectrum then continued to resemble SN 2002cx as it evolved.

At later stages, this supernova did not show the nebular emission lines of a normal Type Ia supernova, instead showing iron and calcium lines. It was suggested that the peculiarity of this event was due to a deflagration explosion. However, observations with the Hubble Space Telescope showed no evidence of unburnt material at late stages, ruling out a "complete deflagration" model. Type Iax supernovae such as SN 2005hk are now widely interpreted as a pure deflagration of a Chandrasekhar mass carbon-oxygen white dwarf. This explosion may have been insufficient to completely unbind the progenitor. Instead, it could have left behind a stellar remnant that is coated in the nuclear products of the explosion, including ^{56}Ni.
