= NGC 3506 =

Spiral galaxy in the constellation Leo

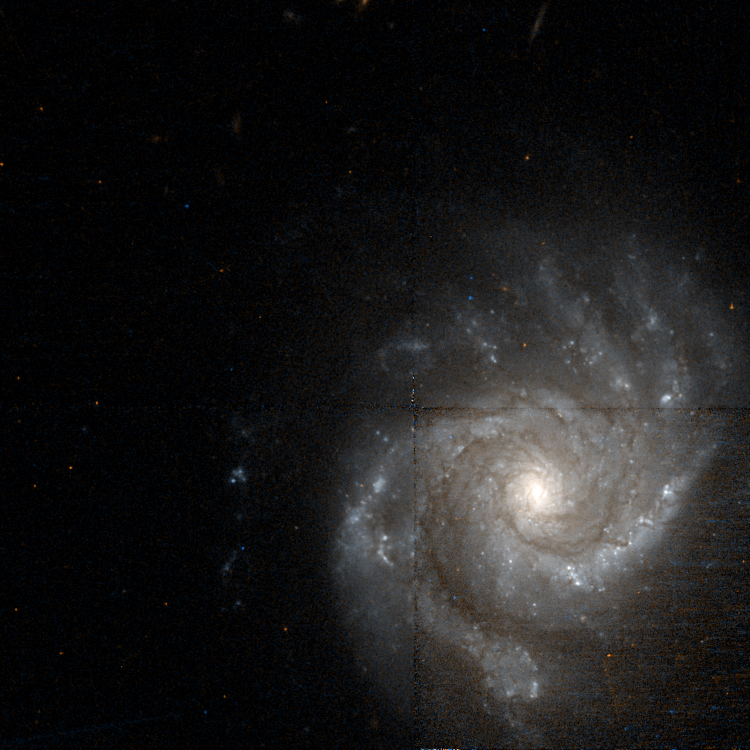
- NGC 3506 imaged by the Hubble Space Telescope

Observation data (J2000 epoch)
- Constellation: Leo
- Right ascension: 11^{h} 03^{m} 13.0^{s}
- Declination: 11° 04′ 36″
- Redshift: 6408 ± 3 km/s
- Distance: 297 Mly (86 Mpc)
- Apparent magnitude (V): 12.6

Characteristics
- Type: Sc
- Apparent size (V): 1.2′ × 1.1′

Other designations
- UGC 6120, MCG +02-28-047, PGC 33379

NGC 3506 is a spiral galaxy in the constellation Leo. It is located at a distance of circa 300 million light years from Earth, which, given its apparent dimensions, means that NGC 3506 is about 115,000 light years across. The galaxy has two main spiral arms, with high surface brightness, which can be traced for half a revolution before they fade. One arm splits into four spiral arcs.

It is an isolated galaxy.

== Supernovae ==
Three supernovae have been observed in NGC 3506:

- SN 2003L (Type Ic, mag. 16.9) was discovered by Tom Boles and LOTOSS (Lick Observatory and Tenagra Observatory Supernova Searches) on 12 January 2003. Its spectrum featured a relatively blue continuum, dominated by strong P-Cyg lines of Ca II (H and K) and Fe II and a relatively weaker Si II 635.5-nm line was also visible.
- SN 2017dfq (Type Ia, mag. 16.5) was discovered by ASAS-SN on 20 April 2017.
- SN 2021adgz (Type II, mag. 19.408) was discovered by Automatic Learning for the Rapid Classification of Events (ALeRCE) on 4 November 2021.

== Gallery ==
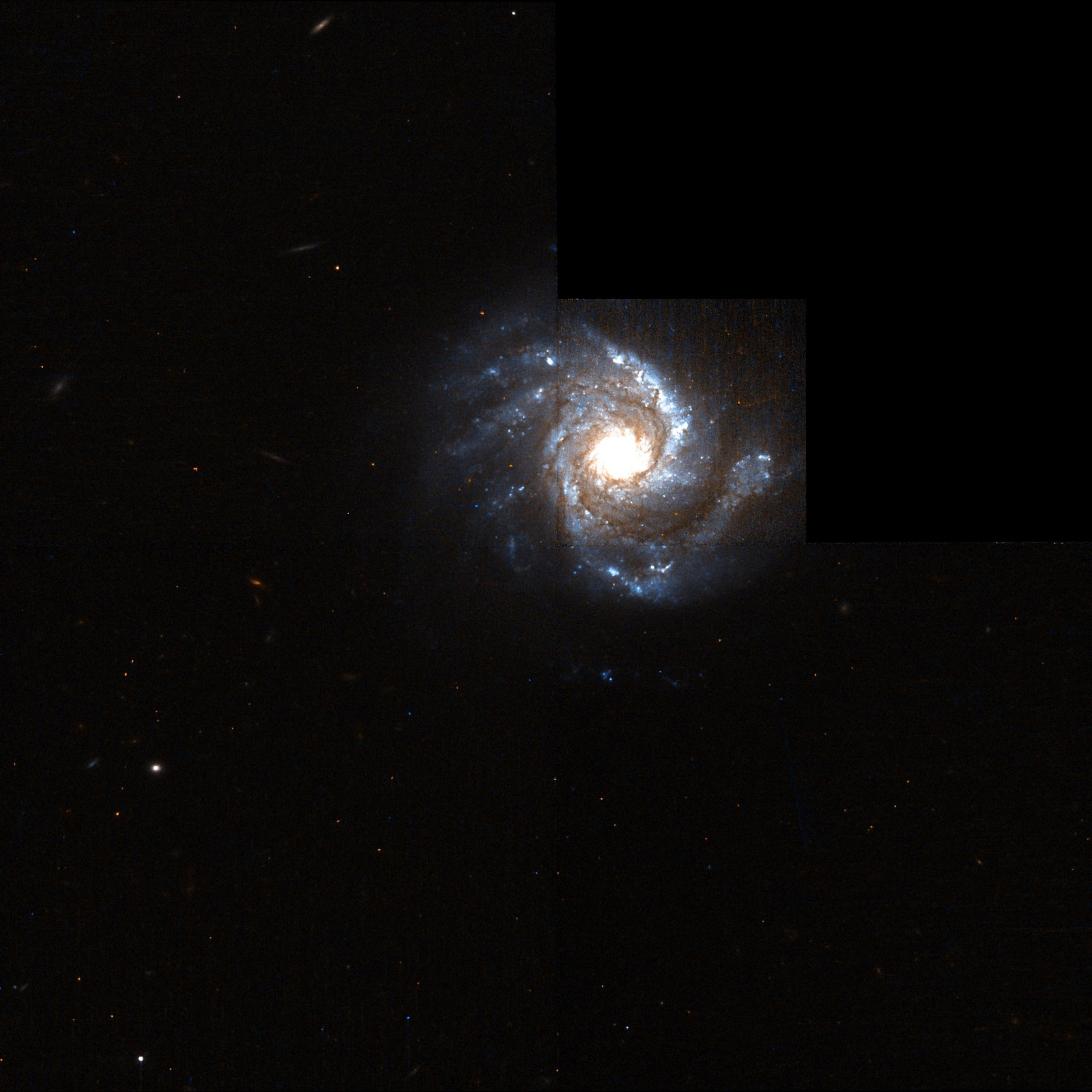
NGC 3506 imaged by the HST

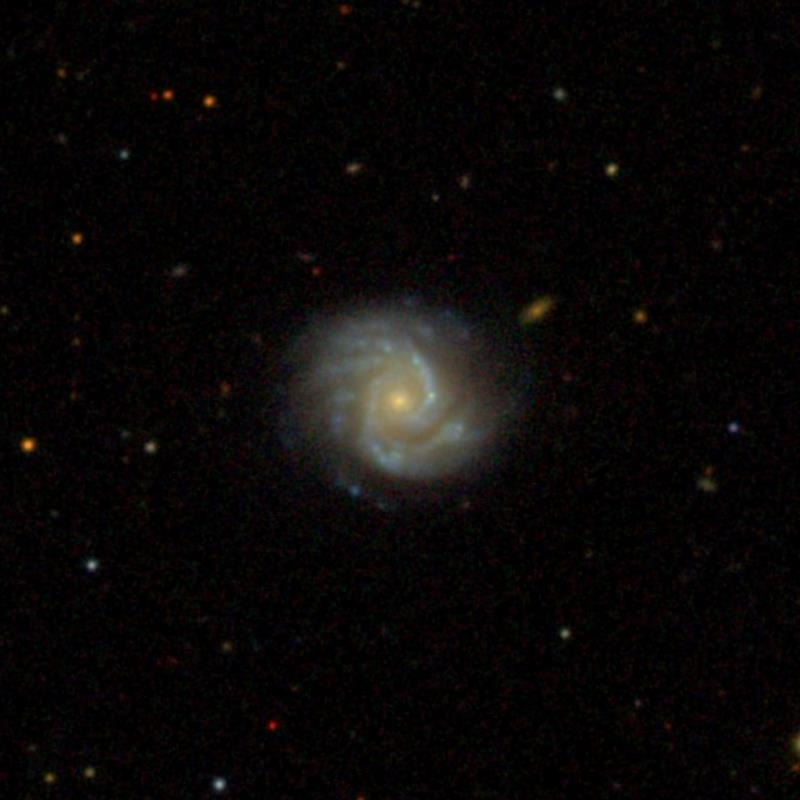
NGC 3506 imaged by SDSS DR14

== See also ==
- UGC 6093 - A nearby barred spiral galaxy
