= NGC 1585 =

Galaxy in the constellation Caelum

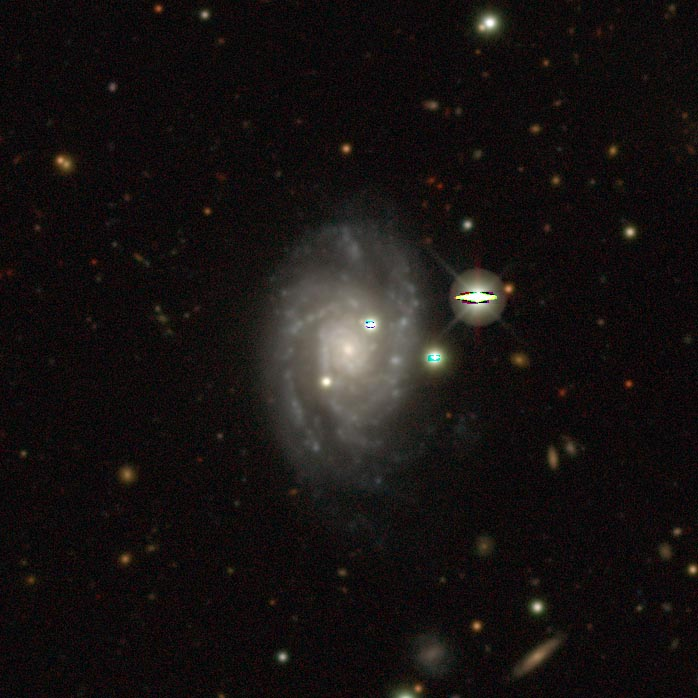
- NGC 1585 imaged by Legacy Surveys

Observation data (J2000 epoch)
- Constellation: Caelum
- Right ascension: 04^{h} 27^{m} 33.0055^{s}
- Declination: −42° 09′ 54.502″
- Redshift: 0.015534
- Heliocentric radial velocity: 4657 ± 31 km/s
- Distance: 223.0 ± 15.8 Mly (68.36 ± 4.83 Mpc)
- Apparent magnitude (V): 13.5

Characteristics
- Type: SAc
- Size: ~129,400 ly (39.66 kpc) (estimated)
- Apparent size (V): 1.2′ × 0.7′

Other designations
- ESO 303- G 018, IRAS 04259-4216, 2MASX J04273300-4209549, MCG -07-10-006, PGC 15150

NGC 1585 is a spiral galaxy in the constellation of Caelum. Its velocity with respect to the cosmic microwave background is 4,635 ± 31 km/s, which corresponds to a Hubble distance of 68.4 ± 4.8 Mpc (~223 million light-years). It was discovered by British astronomer John Herschel on 1 December 1837.

The SIMBAD database lists NGC 1585 as a Seyfert I Galaxy, i.e. it has a quasar-like nucleus with very high surface brightnesses whose spectra reveal strong, high-ionisation emission lines, but unlike quasars, the host galaxy is clearly detectable.

== Supernovae ==
Two supernovae have been observed in NGC 1585:

- SN 2023vio (Type Iax [02cx-like], mag. 19.053) was discovered by ATLAS on 17 October 2023.
- SN 2025xes (Type Ia, mag. 16.81) was discovered by ATLAS on 10 September 2025.

== See also ==
- List of NGC objects (1001–2000)
