= CA 101 =

CA101 may refer to:

- U.S. Route 101 in California, a US highway
- Caproni Ca.101, an experimental airctaft
- Caldwell 101, a ster cluster
