= NGC 6708 =

Galaxy in the constellation Telescopium

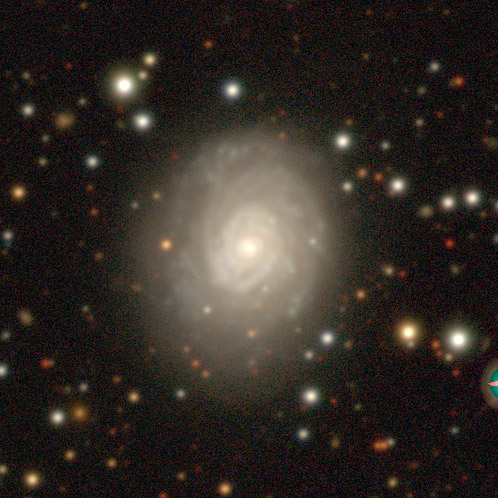
- NGC 6708 imaged by Legacy Surveys

Observation data (J2000 epoch)
- Constellation: Telescopium
- Right ascension: 18^{h} 55^{m} 35.5961^{s}
- Declination: −53° 43′ 24.494″
- Redshift: 0.008603±0.000043
- Heliocentric radial velocity: 2,579±13 km/s
- Distance: 116 Mly (35.7 Mpc)
- Group or cluster: IC 4797 group (LGG 425)
- Apparent magnitude (V): 12.7

Characteristics
- Type: Sb
- Size: ~47,500 ly (14.56 kpc) (estimated)
- Apparent size (V): 1.1′ × 0.9′

Other designations
- ESO 183- G 027, IRAS 18515-5347, PGC 62569

NGC 6708 is a spiral galaxy in the constellation of Telescopium. Its velocity with respect to the cosmic microwave background is 2,520±14 km/s, which corresponds to a Hubble distance of 121.2 ± 8.5 Mly (37.17 ± 2.62 Mpc). Additionally, one non-redshift measurement gives a similar distance of 116 Mly (35.7 Mpc). It was discovered by British astronomer John Herschel on 9 June 1836.

== IC 4797 group ==
According to A. M. Garcia, NGC 6708 is part of the IC 4797 group (also known as LGG 425). This group contains at least five galaxies, including NGC 6707, IC 4796, IC 4797, and ESO 183-30.

== Supernovae ==
Three supernovae have been observed in NGC 6708:

- SN 2004do (Type Ia, mag. 16.3) was discovered by South African amateur astronomer Berto Monard on 4 August 2004.
- SN 2011ce (Type Iax, mag. 15.8) was discovered by The CHilean Automatic Supernova sEarch (CHASE) on 19 April 2011. It was initially classified as Type Ia-pec, but later analysis concluded that it was Type Iax.
- SN 2025tam (Type II, mag. 16.044) was discovered by ATLAS on 2 August 2025.

== See also ==
- List of NGC objects (6001–7000)
