= NGC 634 =

Galaxy in the constellation Triangulum

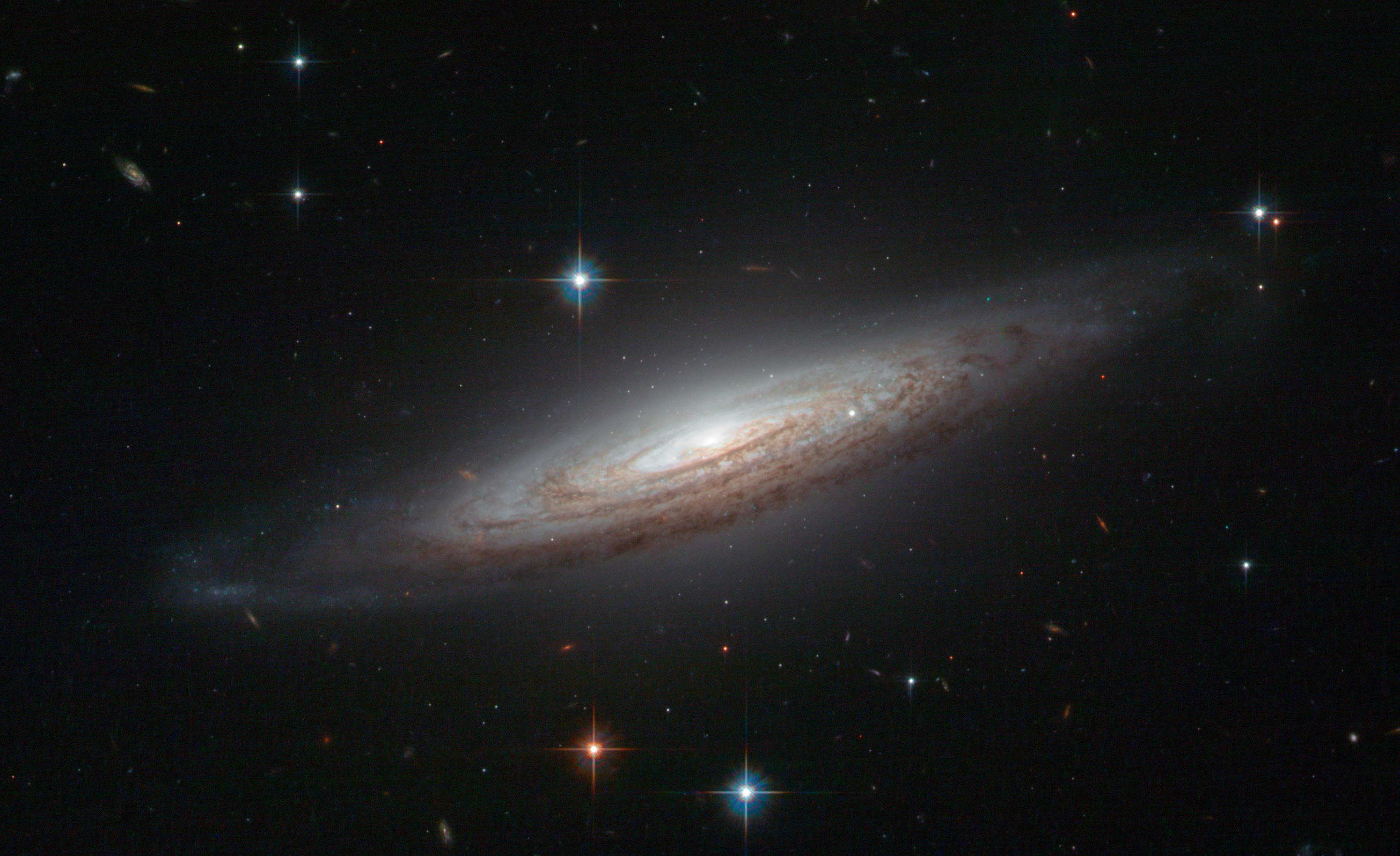
- Picture created from images taken with the Wide Field Channel of Hubble's Advanced Camera for Surveys

Observation data (J2000 epoch)
- Constellation: Triangulum
- Right ascension: 01^{h} 38^{m} 18.679^{s}
- Declination: +35° 21′ 53.47″
- Redshift: 0.016417
- Heliocentric radial velocity: 4,925 km/s
- Distance: 217.1 Mly (66.55 Mpc)
- Apparent magnitude (V): 14.0

Characteristics
- Type: Sa
- Size: 144,000 ly (44.16 kpc) (diameter; D_{25} isophote)
- Apparent size (V): 2′.04 × 0′.55

Other designations
- MCG+06-04-048, UGC 1164, PGC 6059

NGC 634 is a spiral galaxy, lying at a distance of 217.1 megalight-years away from the Milky Way in the northern constellation of Triangulum. This object was discovered on 26 October 1876 by French astronomer Édouard Stephan. It is inclined by an angle of 82.4° to the line of sight from the Earth, and thus is being viewed nearly edge on.

== Supernovae ==
One supernovae have been observed in NGC 634:

- SN 2006Q (Type II, mag. 17.2) was discovered by the Lick Observatory Supernova Search (LOSS) on January 24, 2006. It was 2.5″ east and 1.0″ north of the galactic core.
- SN 2008A (Type Iax, mag. 17.6) was discovered by Yoshimi Ichimura on January 2, 2008. It was positioned 16.6 arcseconds west and 20.2 arcseconds north of the Galactic Center. This supernova reached a peak magnitude of 16.7 on January 3.
