= SN 2008ha =

Supernova in the constellation Pegasus

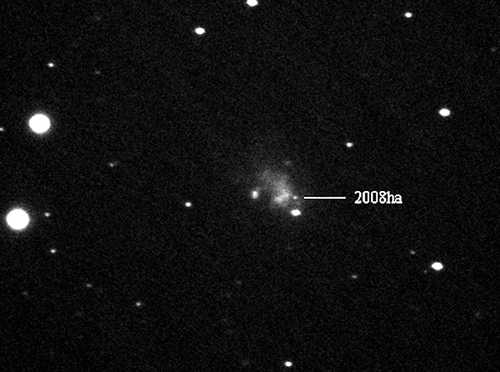
- Event type: Supernova
- Ia 2002cx-like
- Date: November 7, 2008
- Constellation: Pegasus
- Right ascension: 23 h 34 m 52 s
- Declination: +18°13'35"
- Epoch: J2000.0
- Galactic coordinates: 098.5631 −40.9944
- Distance: 21.3 Mpc (69 Mly)
- Redshift: 0.0069, 0.0046, 0.0047
- Host: UGC 12682
- Other designations: SN 2008ha

SN 2008ha was a Type Ia Supernova which was first observed around November 7, 2008 in the galaxy UGC 12682, which lies in the constellation Pegasus at a distance of about 21.3 megaparsecs (69 Mly) from Earth.

SN 2008ha was unusual in several ways: with an absolute V band magnitude of −14.2 it is one of the faintest supernovae ever observed; its host galaxy type very rarely produces supernovae. Another unusual feature of SN 2008ha was its low expansion velocity of only ~2000 km/s at maximum brightness, which indicates a very small kinetic energy released in the explosion. For comparison, SN 2002cx expanded at a velocity of ~5000 km/s whereas typical SN Ia expand at around ~10,000 km/s. The low expansion velocity of SN2008ha resulted in relatively small Doppler broadening of spectral emission lines and this led to higher quality data.

The supernova was studied with ultraviolet, optical, and near-infrared photometry as well as optical spectra, using the Magellan telescopes in Chile, the MMT telescope in Arizona, the Gemini and Keck telescopes in Hawaii, and NASA's Swift satellite. Spectroscopically, SN 2008ha was identified as a SN 2002cx-type, a peculiar sub-class of SN Ia. SN 2008ha had a brightness period of only 10 days, which is significantly shorter than that of other SN 2002cx-like objects (~15 days) or normal Ia supernovas (~20 days). From the peak luminosity and the brightness time it was estimated that SN 2008ha generated (3.0 ± 0.9) × 10^{−3} M_{☉} of ^{56}Ni, had a kinetic energy of 2 × 10^{48} ergs, and ejected 0.15 M_{☉} of material.

== Discovery ==
SN 2008ha was co-discovered by Caroline Moore, Jack Newton and Tim Puckett, members of the Puckett Observatory World Supernova Search. The 14-year-old Moore received considerable attention for her role in the discovery because at the time, she was the youngest person to have discovered a supernova. Moore is currently majoring in Political Science at Georgetown University. She was born and raised in Warwick, NY. To make the discovery she spent almost 7 months sifting through Puckett Observatory Supernova Search (POSS) images. Incredibly, she made her discovery using a relatively small, low-powered telescope.

In July 2009, she discovered her second supernova named SN2009he.

From a young age, Moore had practiced amateur astronomy with the assistance of her father. Early on she was very familiar with telescopes because of her scientific upbringing. She even converted her tree house into an observatory. Following her discovery, Moore was awarded $384,000 in grants from the University of California-Berkeley.

Moore has since traveled across the US to promote the field of astronomy to children and discuss her discovery at astronomy events. She also used fundraising to construct an observatory in her former elementary school.

Moore's discovery has allowed scientists to better understand the nature of the death of stars. It challenged the assumptions of the then current model for the explosive nature of supernovas. This is because 2008ha's low energy and low luminosity during the death of the star could not be explained with the current scientific model at the time due to it not being able to be distinctly classified as either a Type Ia or Type II Supernova. Despite being one of the weakest observed supernova on record, it was up to 1000 times brighter than the sun at one point and is approximately 70 million light years away from earth. Some scientists suggested that the supernova may have failed in exploding completely which is why the light emitted from it is so weak compared to other supernovas.

In reference to Moore, one astrophysicist remarked that "the youngest person to ever discover a supernova found one of the most peculiar and interesting supernovae ever." President of the United States Barack Obama and First Lady Michelle Obama met with Moore after her discovery.

== See also ==
- Zombie star
