= IC 5052 =

Galaxy in the constellation Pavo

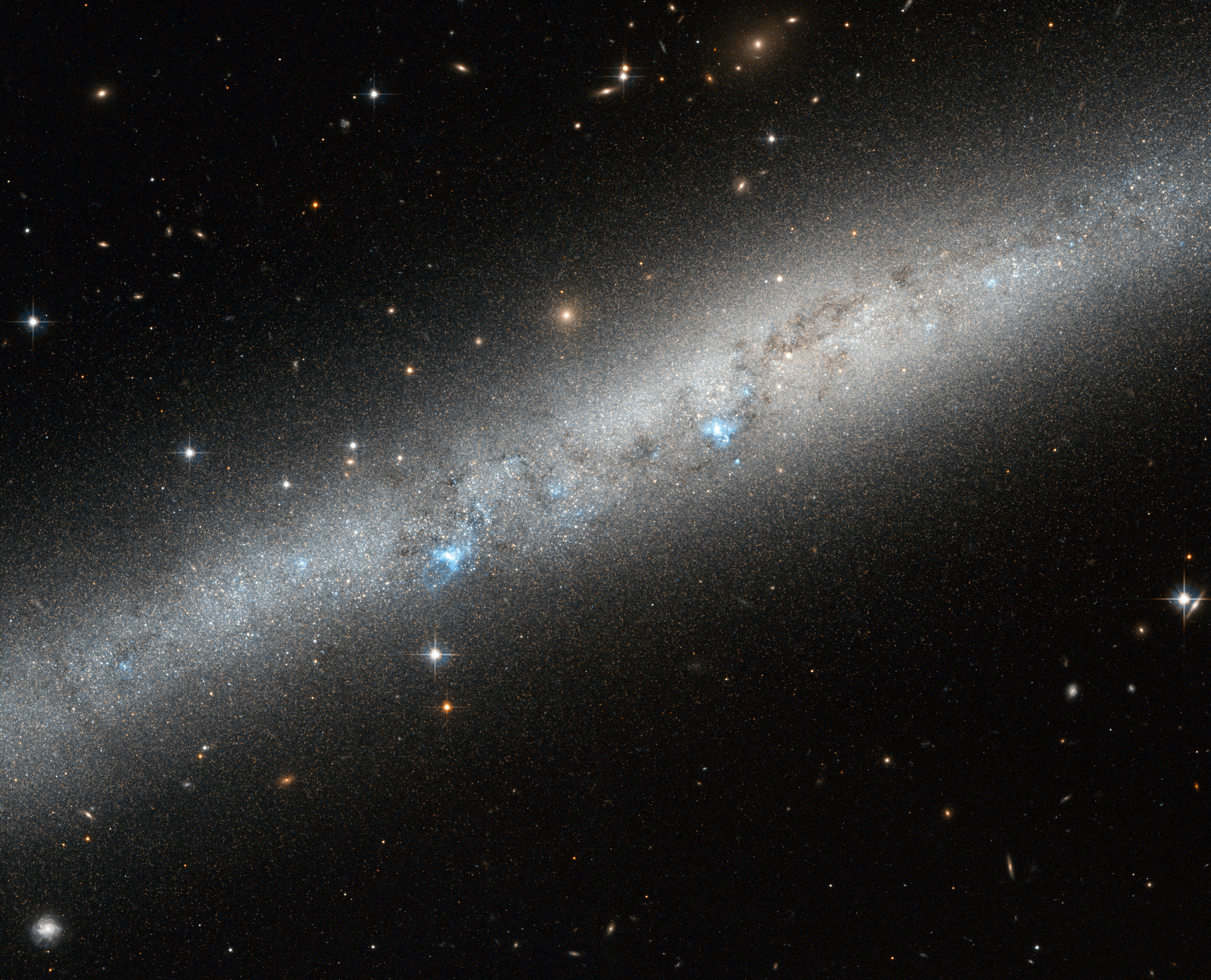
- IC 5052 by Hubble Space Telescope

Observation data (J2000 epoch)
- Constellation: Pavo
- Right ascension: 20^{h} 52^{m} 05.6^{s}
- Declination: −69° 12′ 06″
- Redshift: 0.001948 ± 0.000010
- Heliocentric radial velocity: 584 ± 3 km/s
- Distance: 24 ± 6.0 Mly (7.4 ± 1.9 Mpc)
- Apparent magnitude (V): 10.6

Characteristics
- Type: SBd
- Apparent size (V): 5.9′ × 0.8′
- Notable features: Viewed edge-on

Other designations
- ESO 074-G015, AM 2047-692, PGC 65603

IC 5052 is a barred spiral galaxy located in the constellation Pavo. It is located at a distance of circa 25 million light years from Earth, which, given its apparent dimensions, means that IC 5052 is about 40,000 light years across. It was discovered by DeLisle Stewart on August 23, 1900.

IC 5052 is viewed edge-on. When spiral galaxies are viewed from this angle, it is very difficult to fully understand their properties and how they are arranged. IC 5052 is actually a barred spiral galaxy – its spiral arms do not begin from the centre point but are instead attached to either end of a straight "bar" of stars that cuts through the galaxy's middle. The profile of the galaxy is irregular, with the northwest side having a much higher surface brightness than the southeast side. Also, one half of the galactic disk appears thicker that the other. A number of irregular dust lanes are observed across the disk, but none is prominent. No bulge is observed. A population of older stars has been detected off the center of the disk, as well as a stream-like structure, that could indicate a galaxy merger took place in the recent past.

The galaxy is close enough that its stars can be resolved with large telescopes, with the brightest ones having an apparent magnitude of 21. The younger and hotter of the stars lie within HII regions, the largest of which have apparent diameters of at least 2 arcseconds. These pockets of extremely hot newborn stars are visible across the galaxy's length as bursts of pale blue light, partially blocked out by weaving lanes of darker gas and dust.

IC 5052 is characterised as an isolated galaxy, which doesn't belong to a group of galaxies. The nearest large galaxy to IC 5052 is NGC 6744, which is characterised as the main disturber of IC 5052.
