= UGC 12682 =

Irregular galaxy in Pegasus

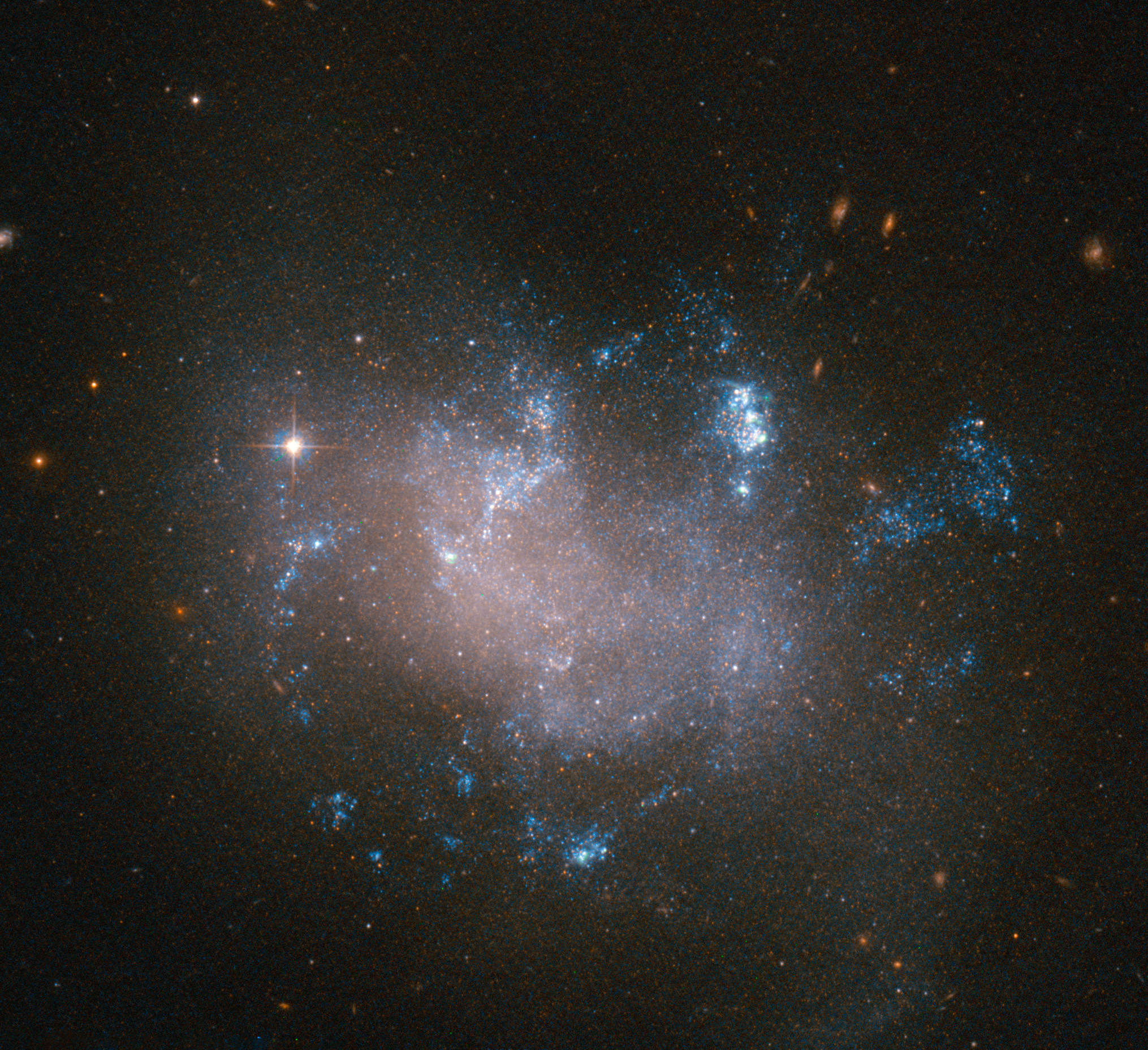
- UGC 12682 imaged by the Hubble Space Telescope.

Observation data (J2000 epoch)
- Constellation: Pegasus
- Right ascension: 23^{h} 34^{m} 53.212^{s}
- Declination: +18° 13′ 36.804″
- Redshift: 0.004623
- Heliocentric radial velocity: 1389 km/s
- Distance: 49.2 ± 3.7 Mly (15.10 ± 1.12 Mpc)

Characteristics
- Type: Im
- Size: ~30,400 ly (9.31 kpc) (estimated)

Other designations
- UCM 2332+1757, DDO 218, IRAS 23323+1757, MCG +03-60-007, PGC 71801, CGCG 455-020, SDSS J233453.21+181336.8
- References: MCG

UGC 12682 is an irregular galaxy, located in the constellation of Pegasus. Its velocity with respect to the cosmic microwave background is 1024 ± 25 km/s, which corresponds to a Hubble distance of 49.2 ± 3.7 Mly (15.10 ± 1.12 Mpc). In addition, one non redshift measurement gives a distance of 65 Mly (20.0 Mpc). The earliest known reference to this galaxy is from the 1959 journal A Catalogue of Dwarf Galaxies by Sidney van den Bergh, where it is listed as DDO 218.

On 7 November 2008, 14-year-old amateur astronomer Caroline Moore from Warwick, New York, became the youngest supernova discoverer at the time, when she found SN 2008ha (Type Ia, mag. 18.8) in UGC 12682.

== See also ==
- Uppsala General Catalogue
