= NGC 1309 =

Spiral galaxy in the constellation Eridanus

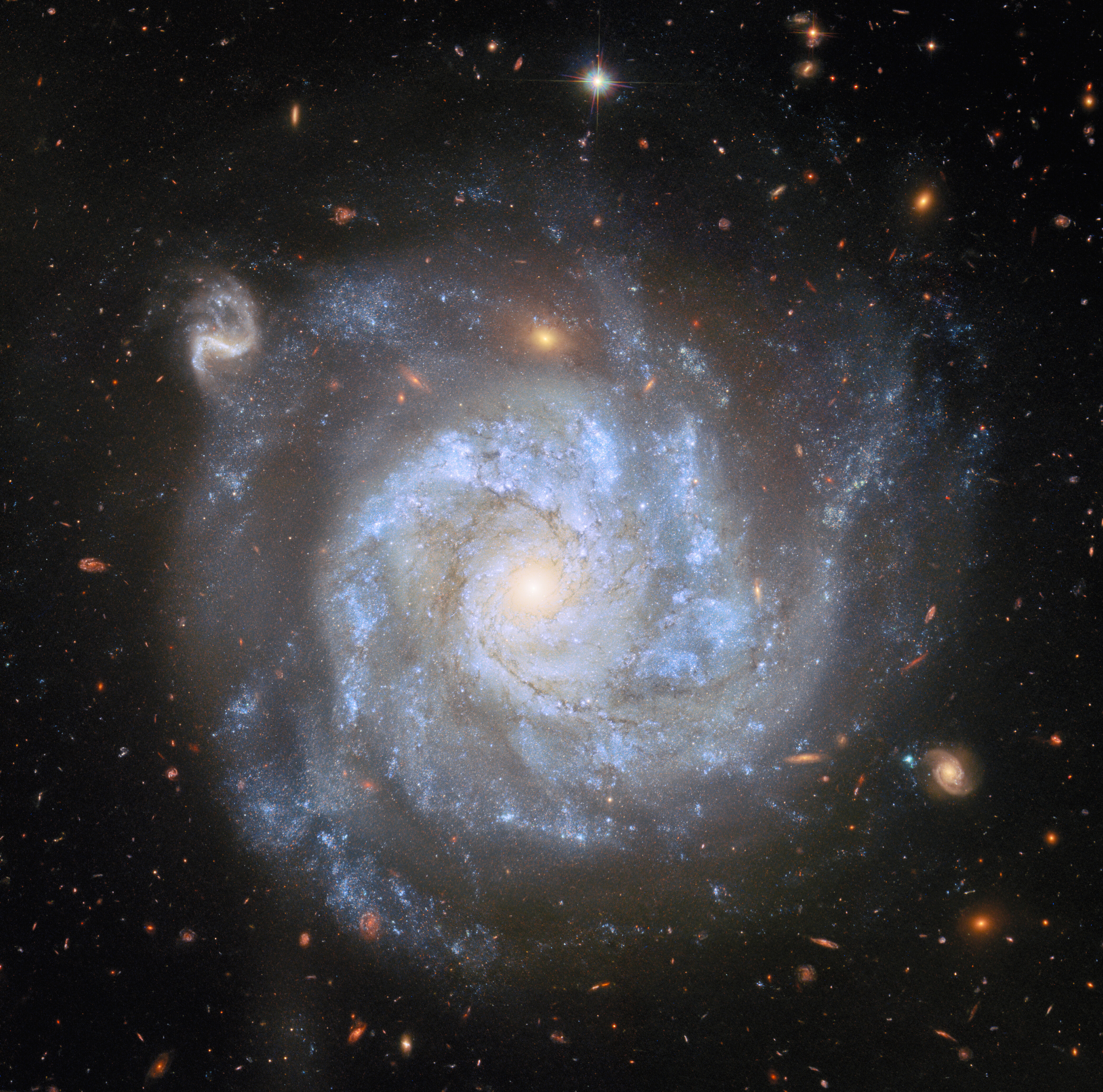
- NGC 1309 imaged by the Hubble Space Telescope

Observation data (J2000.0 epoch)
- Constellation: Eridanus
- Right ascension: 03^{h} 22^{m} 06.5966^{s}
- Declination: −15° 23′ 59.882″
- Redshift: 0.007125
- Heliocentric radial velocity: 2136 ± 4 km/s
- Distance: 120 Mly (36 Mpc)
- Group or cluster: NGC 1309 Group (LGG 92)
- Apparent magnitude (V): 12.0

Characteristics
- Type: SA(s)bc
- Size: ~66,700 ly (20.46 kpc) (estimated)
- Apparent size (V): 2.2 x 2.0 arcmin

Other designations
- IRAS 03197-1534, MCG -03-09-028, PGC 12626

NGC 1309 is a spiral galaxy located approximately 120 million light-years away, appearing in the constellation Eridanus. It was discovered by German-British astronomer William Herschel on 3 October 1785.

NGC 1309 is about 75,000 light-years across, and is about 3/4s the width of the Milky Way. Its shape is classified as SA(s)bc, meaning that it has moderately wound spiral arms and no ring. Bright blue areas of star formation can be seen in the spiral arms, while the yellowish central nucleus contains older-population stars. NGC 1309 is one of over 200 members of the Eridanus Group of galaxies.

== NGC 1309 group ==
NGC 1309 is the brightest member of a trio of galaxies named after it. The other two galaxies in the NGC 1309 group (also known as LGG 92) are MCG -03-09-027 and UGCA 71.

== Supernovae ==
Two supernovae have been observed in NGC 1309:

- SN 2002fk (Type Ia, mag. 15) was discovered jointly by Reiki Kushida of the Yatsugatake South Base Observatory, Nagano Prefecture, Japan; and Jun-jie Wang and Yu-Lei Qiu of the Beijing Astronomical Observatory on 17 Sept 2002. It was estimated to have reached maximum magnitude of ~13.0 before fading away. SN 2002fk's spectra showed no indications of hydrogen, helium or carbon; instead ionized calcium, silicon, iron and nickel were found.

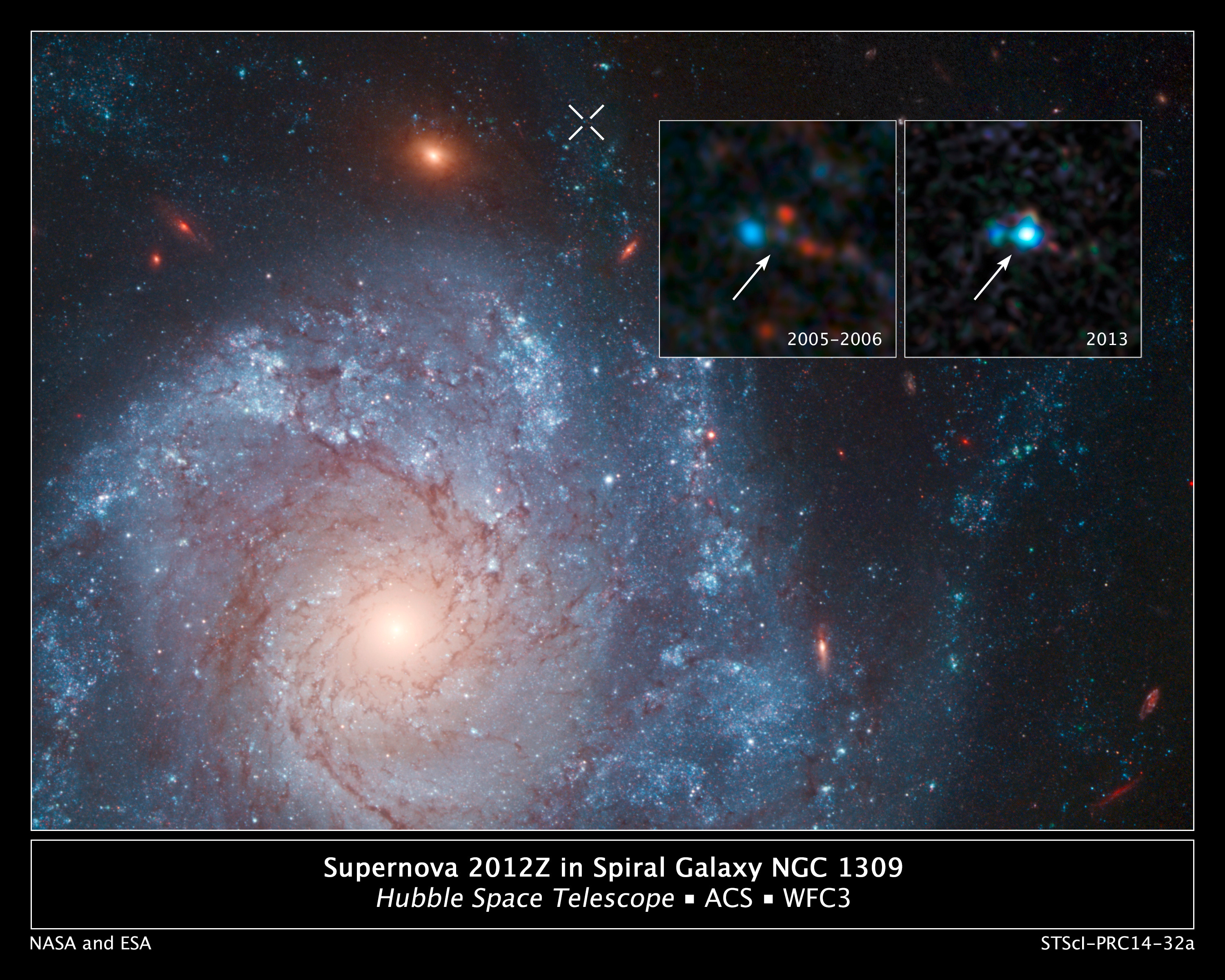
SN 2012Z imaged by the Hubble Space Telescope

- SN 2012Z (Type Iax, mag. 17.6) was discovered jointly by Brad Cenko, Weidong Li, and Alex Filippenko using the Katzman Automatic Imaging Telescope on 29 January 2012 as part of the Lick Observatory Supernova Search. The scientists have hypothesized that this is a Type Iax supernova, and may have left behind a remnant zombie star. In February 2022, a study with new observations has confirmed that the star survived the explosion and is even brighter than before.

== See also ==
- List of NGC objects (1001–2000)
