= NGC 6744 =

Galaxy in the constellation Pavo

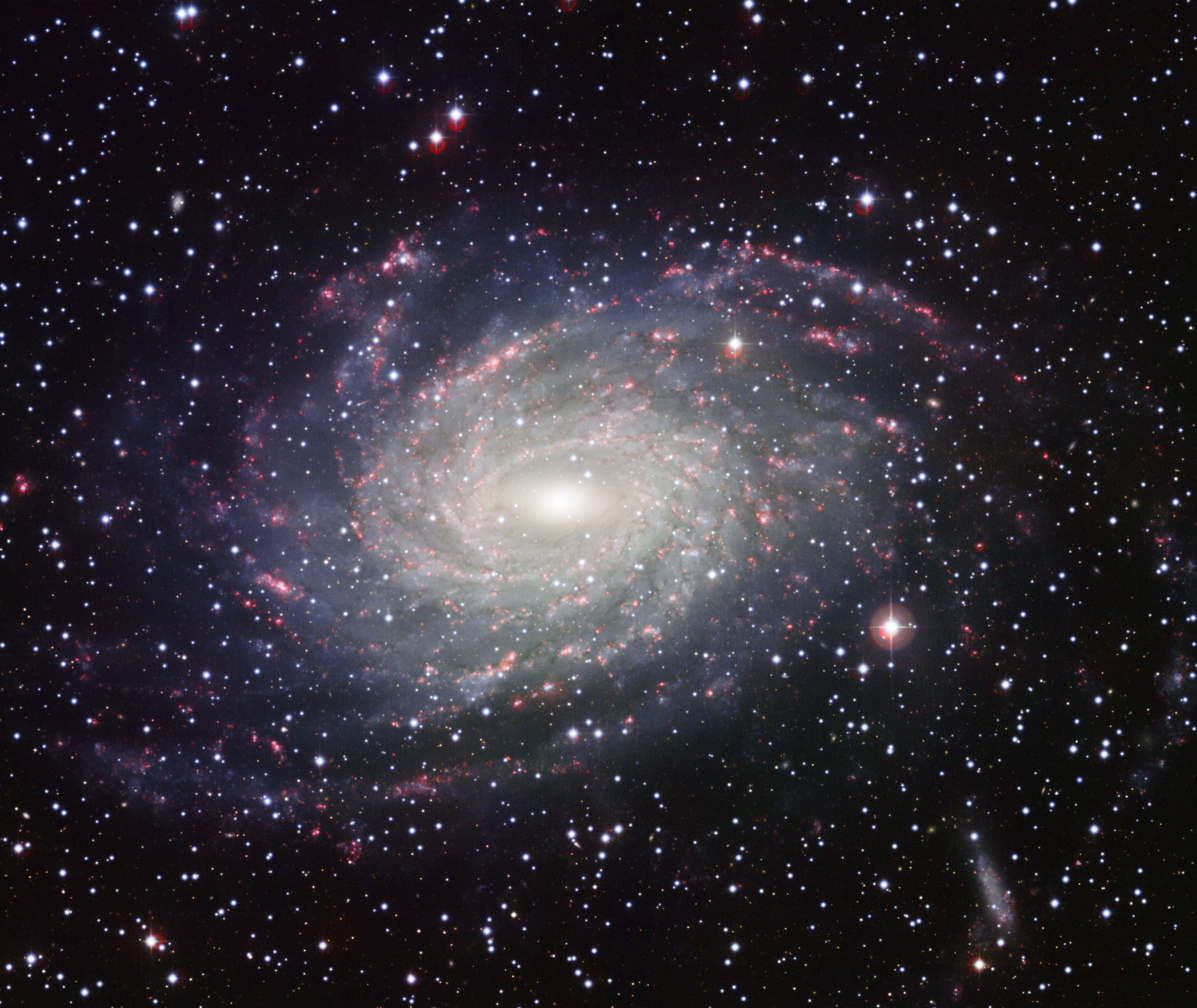
- Wide Field Imager view of a Milky Way look-alike NGC 6744

Observation data (J2000 epoch)
- Constellation: Pavo
- Right ascension: 19^{h} 09^{m} 46.1785^{s}
- Declination: −63° 51′ 26.992″
- Redshift: 0.002805
- Heliocentric radial velocity: 841 ± 2 km/s
- Distance: 23.63 ± 1.68 Mly (7.244 ± 0.514 Mpc)
- Group or cluster: Virgo Supercluster
- Apparent magnitude (V): 9.14

Characteristics
- Type: SAB(r)bc
- Mass: 5.92×10^{10} M_{☉}
- Size: ~171,800 ly (52.68 kpc) (estimated)
- Apparent size (V): 20.0′ × 12.9′

Other designations
- Caldwell 101, ESO 104- G 042, IRAS 19051-6357, PGC 62836

NGC 6744 (also known as Caldwell 101 or the Pavo Galaxy) is an intermediate spiral galaxy in the constellation Pavo (Peacock). Its velocity with respect to the cosmic microwave background is 802 ± 3 km/s, which corresponds to a Hubble distance of 38.6 ± 2.7 Mly (11.82 ± 0.83 Mpc). However, 21 non redshift measurements give a distance of 23.63 ± 1.68 Mly (7.244 ± 0.514 Mpc). It was discovered on 30 June 1826 by Scottish astronomer James Dunlop, observing from Parramatta, Australia. It has a mass of 5.92×10^{10} M_{☉}.

One of the largest spiral galaxies in the local universe, NGC 6744 is considered a Milky Way mimic in the immediate vicinity, displaying remarkable star formation, flocculent (fluffy) arms, and an elongated core. It has at least one distorted companion galaxy (NGC 6744A) superficially similar to one of the Magellanic Clouds.

NGC 6744 is a LINER galaxy, i.e., its nucleus has an emission spectrum characterized by broad lines of weakly ionized atoms. The galaxy has an active galactic nucleus (AGN) of low luminosity.

NGC 6744 lies within the Virgo Supercluster.

== Supernovae ==
Two supernovae have been observed in NGC 6744:

- R. Martin and Berto Monard discovered SN 2005at (Type Ic, mag. 16) on 15 March 2005.
- BlackGEM discovered another astronomical transient, designated SN 2024vjm, on 13 September 2024. After initial Spectral analysis, the star was classified as a peculiar nova, but further observations showed the object to be a faint Type Iax supernova, likely the closest known of this type.

== Gallery ==
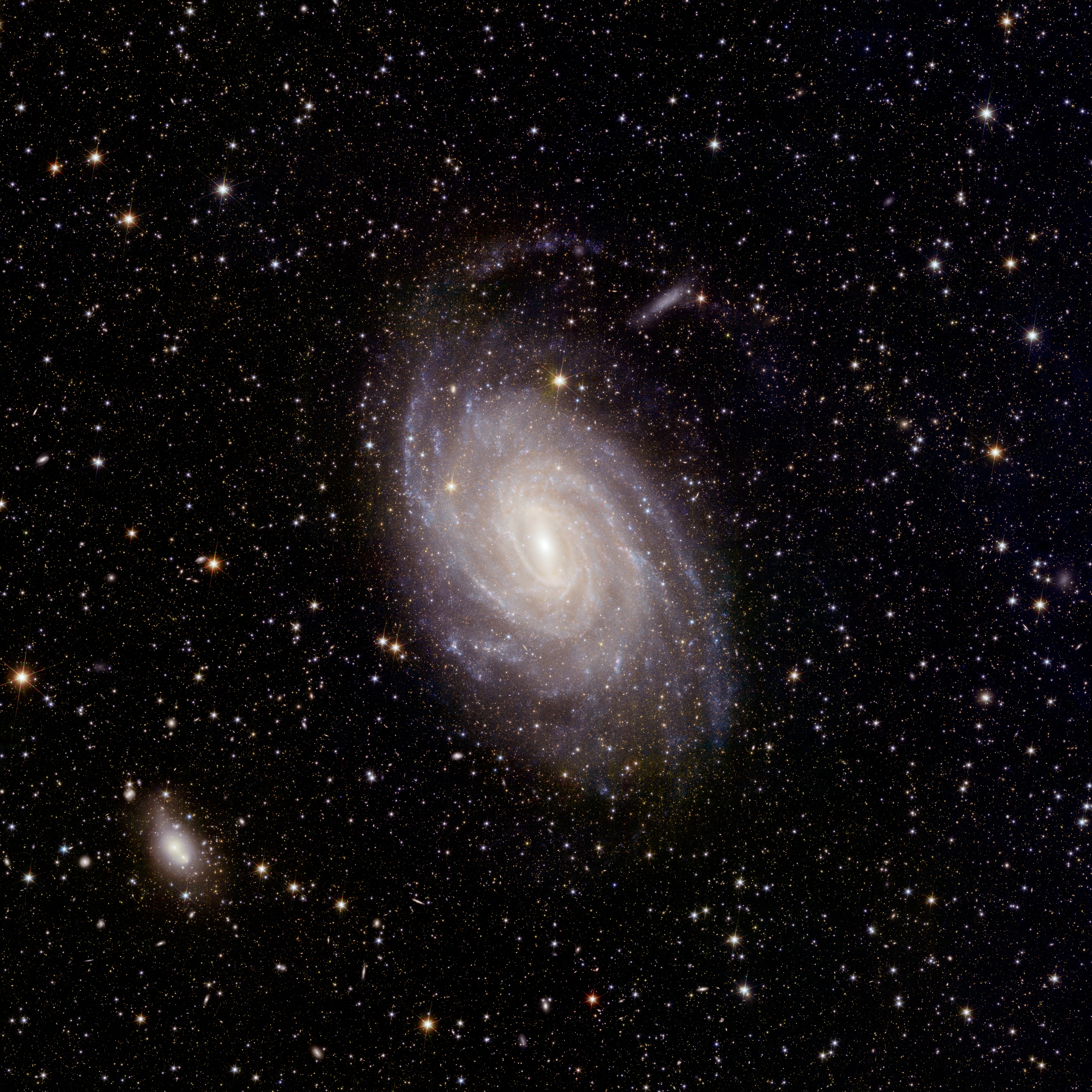
Euclid's view of spiral galaxy NGC 6744

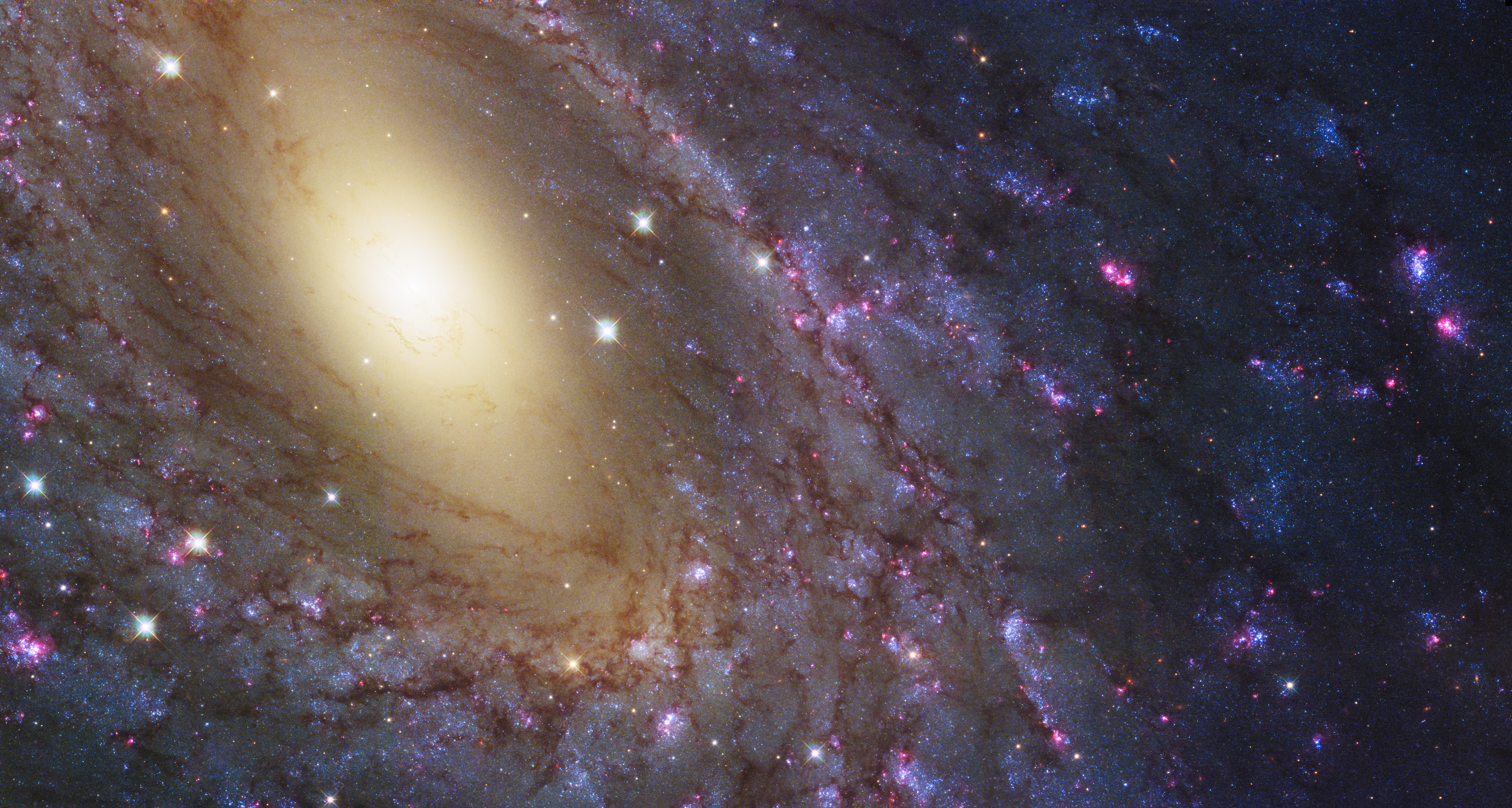
The nucleus of NGC 6744 imaged by the Hubble Space Telescope

== See also ==
- List of NGC objects (6001–7000)
- NGC 2336 – another spiral galaxy of similar size and shape
- NGC 1232
- SPT0418-47 – a spiral galaxy of similar size and shape when the universe was 1.4 billion years old
- UGC 12158
- UGC 6093
- Milky Way
