= Samuel Oschin telescope =

Telescope in the Palomar Observatory

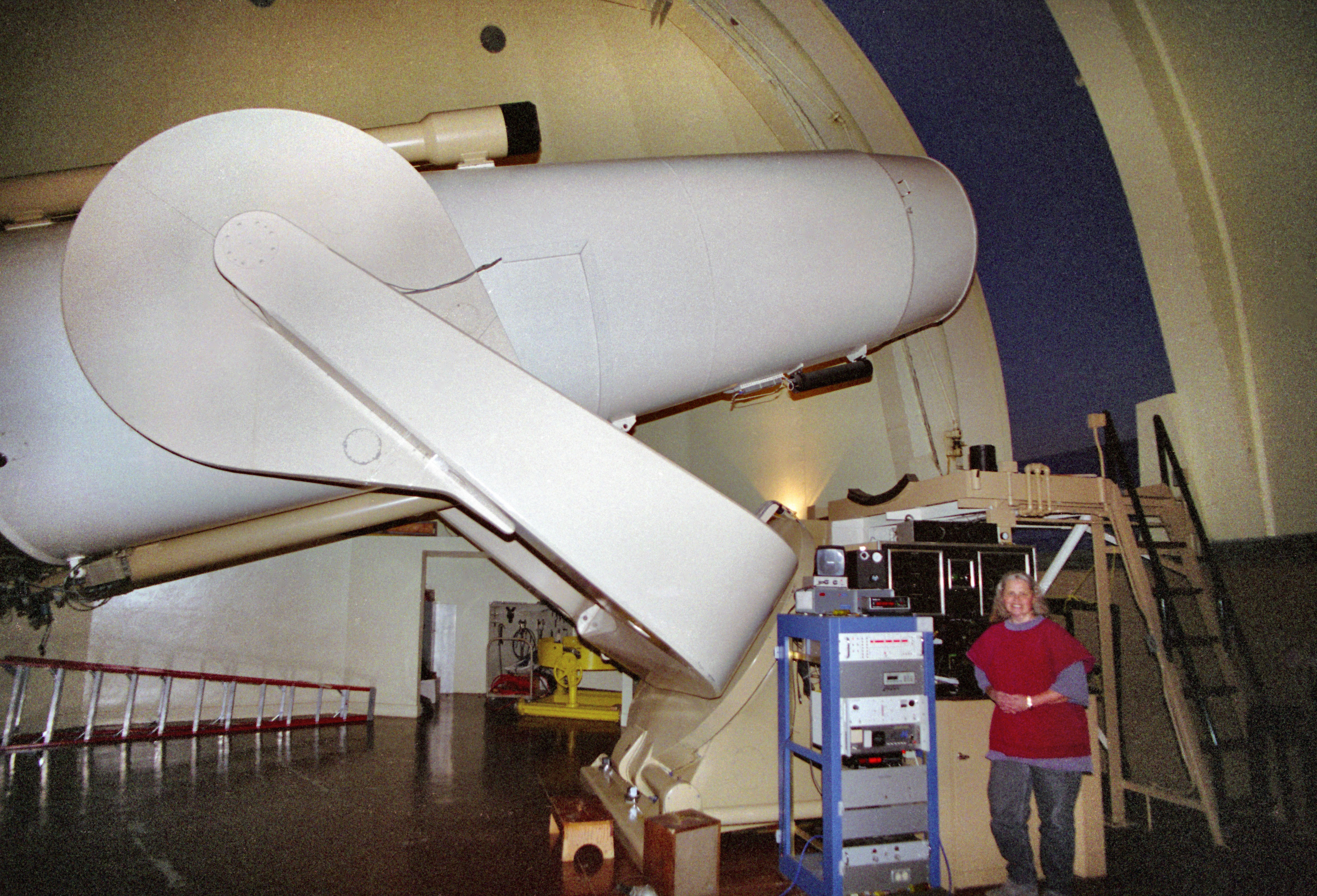
- Alternative names: Oschin Schmidt, 48in Palomar Schmidt
- Part of: Palomar Observatory
- Location: San Diego County, California, Pacific States Region
- Coordinates: 33°21′29″N 116°51′43″W
- Diameter: 48 in (1.2 m)
- Location within the United States
- Related media on Commons

The Samuel Oschin telescope (/ˈɔːʃɪn/), also called the Oschin Schmidt, is a 48-inch-aperture (1.22 m) Schmidt camera at the Palomar Observatory in northern San Diego County, California, United States. It consists of a 49.75-inch (1.264 m) Schmidt corrector plate and a 72-inch (1.8 m) (f/2.5) mirror. The instrument is strictly a camera; there is no provision for an eyepiece to look through it. It originally used 10-inch (25 cm) and 14-inch (36 cm) glass photographic plates. Since the focal plane is curved, these plates had to be preformed in a special jig before being loaded into the camera.

Construction on the Schmidt telescope began in 1939 and it was completed in 1948. It was named the Samuel Oschin telescope in 1986. Before that it was just called the 48-inch (1.2 m) Schmidt.

In the mid-1980s, the corrector plate was replaced using glass with less chromatic aberration, producing higher quality images over a broader spectrum.

Between 2000 and 2001, it was converted to use a CCD imager. The corrector plate was recently replaced using glass that is transparent to a wider range of wavelengths. The telescope was originally hand-guided through one of two 10-inch-aperture (0.25 m) refracting telescopes mounted on either side. The camera is now fully automated and remote-controlled. The data collected are transmitted over the High Performance Wireless Research and Education Network (HPWREN). It is programmed and operated primarily from Pasadena, California, with no operator on site, except to open and close the observatory dome.

== CCD cameras ==
The first CCD camera installed was the Near-Earth Asteroid Tracking (NEAT) camera, which had three separate 4k×4k sensors arranged in a north–south line with substantial (1°) gaps between them. The total field of view was 3.75 square degrees.

From 2003 to 2007, it was the home of the Quasar Equatorial Survey Team camera. This consisted of 112 CCDs, each 2400×600 pixels (161 megapixels total), arranged in four columns of 28 (with gaps between), the largest CCD mosaic used in an astronomical camera at the time.

The next camera installed (in 2009) was a 12,288-by-8,192-pixel mosaic (100 megapixel) originally built for the Canada–France–Hawaii Telescope. This had a field of view of 7.8 square degrees, and was used for the Palomar Transient Factory.

In 2017 the telescope became the host of the Zwicky Transient Facility. Unlike its predecessors, this was custom designed for the Oschin telescope and its wide field of view, using a 16×6144×6160 CCD array (606 megapixels) with a 47-square-degree field of view.

== Plate archive ==
About half of the large photographic glass plate negatives exposed on the telescope, some 19,000 in all, had been accumulating in the sub-basement of the Robinson building at the California Institute of Technology since 1949. In 2002, astronomer Jean Mueller approached Richard Ellis, the director of the Caltech Optical Observatories, to volunteer to the task of organizing the Oschin Telescope plate archive. Given the go-ahead, she recruited eleven volunteers from the Mount Wilson Observatory Association (MWOA) and the Los Angeles Astronomical Society (LAAS), and the team then spent 13 weekends (more than one thousand hours) poring over the stacks, placing plates in protective sleeves, and packing them in more than 500 boxes that were transported to Palomar.

All of the volunteers were presented with the gift of having asteroids named after them, compliments of Carolyn S. Shoemaker: 10028 Bonus, 12680 Bogdanovich, 13914 Galegant, 16452 Goldfinger, 19173 Virginiaterése, 20007 Marybrown, 21148 Billramsey, 22294 Simmons, 27706 Strogen, and 29133 Vargas. Mueller was also rewarded with a visit to the Keck Observatory in Hawaii.

== Discoveries ==
The Oschin Telescope was responsible for the discovery of 90377 Sedna on 2003-11-14 and Eris, the "10th Planet" on 2005-01-05 from images taken 2003-10-21. The peculiar Type Ia supernova SN 2002cx was discovered with the Oschin telescope on 2002-05-12, 21 UT. Other discoveries include 90482 Orcus (in 2004) and 50000 Quaoar (in 2002), both large trans-Neptune objects.

In June 2011 it was reported the telescope discovered 6 supernovae located 8 billion light years from Earth whose composition lacks hydrogen. This is different from normal supernovae, and will contribute to the research of star formation.

== See also ==
- National Geographic Society – Palomar Observatory Sky Survey
- Near Earth Asteroid Tracking (NEAT)
- Palomar Distant Solar System Survey (PDSSS)
- UK Schmidt Telescope, a very similar telescope in Australia
- Palomar–Leiden survey
- List of largest optical telescopes in the 20th century
