= SN 2002cx =

2002 Type Ia supernova event in the constellation Virgo

- Event type: Supernova
- Peculiar Ia
- Date: 2002 May 12.21 UT
- Constellation: Virgo
- Right ascension: 13^{h} 13^{m} 49.72^{s}
- Declination: +6° 57′ 31.9″
- Epoch: J2000
- Distance: Z of 0.024
- Redshift: 0.0236, 0.0244, 0.0241, 0.0242, 0.0243, 0.0249
- Host: CGCG 044-035
- Colour (B-V): 0.04±0.05
- Peak apparent magnitude: +17.57±0.15
- Other designations: SN 2002cx
- Related media on Commons

SN 2002cx is a peculiar Type Ia supernova. It was discovered in May 2002 by a team of researchers from LBL. It behaved differently from normal Type Ia supernovae, and differently from several other previously observed peculiar Type Ia supernovae including SN 1991T and SN 1991bg.

SN 2002cx is now classified as Type Iax supernova, which are subluminal and do not result in complete destruction of the progenitor white dwarf.

== Discovery ==
SN 2002cx was discovered on 2002 May 12.21 UT by W. M. Wood-Vasey, G. Aldering, and P. Nugent of LBL with the Oschin 1.2-m telescope at Palomar. On 2002 May 17.2 a spectrum taken by T. Matheson, S. Jha, P. Challis, and R. Kirshner of the CfA with the 1.5-m telescope at FLWO suggested it was a peculiar SN 1991T like Type Ia. SN 2002cx had photometric follow up taken at Lick using KAIT and the Nickel telescope, and further spectra were taken at FLWO and Keck.

== Features ==
=== Light curve ===
The light curve of SN 2002cx

SN 2002cx hit maximum light in the B-band at 2452415.2 JD (2002 May 20.7) at 17.68, and in the V-band on 2452417.5 JD (2002 May 23) at 17.57. The B-band light curve of SN 2002cx before 15 days after maximum evolves in a similar manner to SN 1999ac, brightening faster than SN 1991T but slower than SN 1994D or SN 2000cx. SN 2002cx declines in brightness faster than SN 1991T and SN 2000cx in the B-band. In the V-band SN 2002cx is similar to SN 1999ac until 30 days after max. Again SN 2002cx declines faster in the V-band than SN 1991T, but slower than is typical for a Type Ia.

SN 2002cx is peculiar in the R-band, as it brightens very fast in a manner wholly different from SN 1999ac. It has no secondary maximum in R-band as expected if it were similar to SN 1991T, but instead has a plateau after max. The R-band also declines more slowly than normal. The I-band behaves similarly to the R-band, with a quick brightening, a plateau and slow decline. While a plateau in the I-band is expected for sub-luminous supernovae, the following slow decline is not.

=== Spectra ===
Four spectra of SN 2002cx

The first spectrum of SN 2002cx was obtained with FLWO on 2002 May 17, 4 days before B-band max. At this point SN 2002cx is similar to SN 1997br as both have a blue continuum, with absorption lines from Fe III λ4404 and Fe III λ5129. Si II λ6355 though is not apparent in SN 2002cx at this point, and it has very weak Ca II H & K lines suggesting that SN 2002cx is similar to SN 1991T which also lacked such lines. This spectrum for SN 2002cx has a low expansion velocity measuring only ~6400 km s^{−1}. This marked one way in which it was different from SN 1997br, as SN 1997br's expansion velocity was ~10,400 km s^{−1} at the same point relative to its own B-band maximum. At the time of measurement SN 2002cx's expansion velocity was the lowest measured for an early time Type Ia, Another spectrum taken on 2002 May 20, 1 day before B-band maximum light, showed little evolution from the one taken on 2002 May 17.

Four later spectra were taken on June 2, June 6, June 12, and June 16 at FLWO. The spectrum of SN 2002cx has evolved by this point to have a redder continuum. It has also lost the Fe III absorption lines and its Fe II lines have gained prominence at λ4555 and λ5129. The Ca II H & K lines continue to remain weak, a further departure from SN 1997br. Unlike another type of sub-luminous Type Ia, SN 1991bg, SN 2002cx does not show Ti II lines around 4100–4400 Å.

Spectra were taken at Keck corresponding to 20, 25, and 26 days after maximum light in the B-band. So little evolution was observed between these spectra that they were all combined in order to increase the signal-to-noise ratio and study less pronounced features. Fe II still dominates the spectrum. The Ca II infrared triplet is weak in SN 2002cx as compared to other Type Ia supernovae, as expected since the Ca II H & K line is also weak in SN 2002cx. Unlike other Type Ia supernova, SN 2002cx has double-peaked emission lines which may be due to jet-like emissions or rotating ejecta, or may simply only be seen in SN 2002cx because its low expansion velocity does not wash them out. The emission or ejecta hypothesis is considered less likely because if it were the case all the peaks should share equal separation, which they do not. SN 2002cx has absorption and emission lines between 6400 Å and 7000 Å that are unique among previously discovered Type Ia supernovae.

A final spectrum of SN 2002cx was taken on July 16, 56 days after B-band maximum. SN 2002cx was by then in the nebular phase, with emission lines dominating over absorption lines. The lines were far narrower than previously observed Type Ia supernovae and are less pronounced as well. SN 2002cx most clearly differs from other Type Ia supernovae in the region between 6500 Å and 8500 Å where it has a primarily flat continuum and weak Ca II infrared triplet absorption. Because this is the region covered by the R and I-bands, it may explain the odd color evolution of SN 2002cx in these bands.

SN 2002cx did not evolve much between 4 days and 1 day before max, nor did it evolve much from 12 days after max to 27 days after max, However, it underwent dramatic evolution during the two weeks after maximum light in the B-band.

Based on the odd behavior of SN 2002cx's spectrum there are some questions as to whether it is a Type Ia supernova or not. Although it does not show Si II lines near 6150 Å as is required of a Type Ia, SN 2002cx's evolution is explainable using the paradigm of other Type Ia observations and so Li et al. consider their classification as a Type Ia as secure.

=== Color ===
SN 2002cx does not suffer from much host related reddening, as evidenced by its very blue spectra. It is extinct in B−V color by 0.034 magnitudes from dust in Milky Way.

SN 2002cx is similar to SN 1999ac in B−V at max, but also at times as late as 50 days after max which is unexpected as the two supernovae evolve differently at late times. SN 2002cx has a B−V color of −0.04±0.04 at 4 days before max, and 0.04±0.05 at the time of max in the B-band which is bluer than SN 1991bg at the same time. The color of SN 2002cx is consistent with Lira-Phillips law at late times.

The V−R color of SN 2002cx evolves similar to other Type Ia supernovae before 5 days after max, although it is somewhat redder. After 5 days after max SN 2002cx gets progressively redder, although still slightly bluer than SN 1991bg. At 25 days after max SN 2002cx continues to redden, while SN 1991bg starts to get bluer.

SN 2002cx's V−I color is red for all times, only slightly bluer than SN 1991bg before 25 days after max, and redder after 25 days after max.

== Bibliography ==
- Branch, David; Baron, E.; Thomas, R. C.; Kasen, D.; Li, Weidong; Filippenko, Alexei V. (October 2004). "Reading the Spectra of the Most Peculiar Type Ia Supernova 2002cx". Publications of the Astronomical Society of the Pacific. 116 (824): 903–908. arXiv:astro-ph/0408130. Bibcode:2004PASP..116..903B. doi:10.1086/425081. S2CID 118965499.
- Jha, Saurabh; Branch, David; Chornock, Ryan; Foley, Ryan J.; Li, Weidong; Swift, Brandon J.; Casebeer, Darrin; Filippenko, Alexei V. (July 2006). "Late-Time Spectroscopy of SN 2002cx: The Prototype of a New Subclass of Type Ia Supernovae". Astronomical Journal. 132 (1): 189–196. arXiv:astro-ph/0602250. Bibcode:2006AJ....132..189J. doi:10.1086/504599. S2CID 6126225.
- Li, Weidong; Filippenko, Alexei V.; Chornock, Ryan; et al. (April 2003). "SN 2002cx: The Most Peculiar Known Type Ia Supernova". Publications of the Astronomical Society of the Pacific. 115 (806): 453–473. arXiv:astro-ph/0301428. Bibcode:2003PASP..115..453L. doi:10.1086/374200. S2CID 119036991.
- Matheson, T.; S. Jha; P. Challis; R. Kirshner (2002-05-17). "Circular No. 7903". Central Bureau Electronic Telegrams.
- Wood-Vasey, W. M.; Aldering, G.; Nugent, P. (2002-05-17). "Circular No. 7902". Central Bureau Electronic Telegrams.
