= UGC 6093 =

Galaxy in the constellation Leo

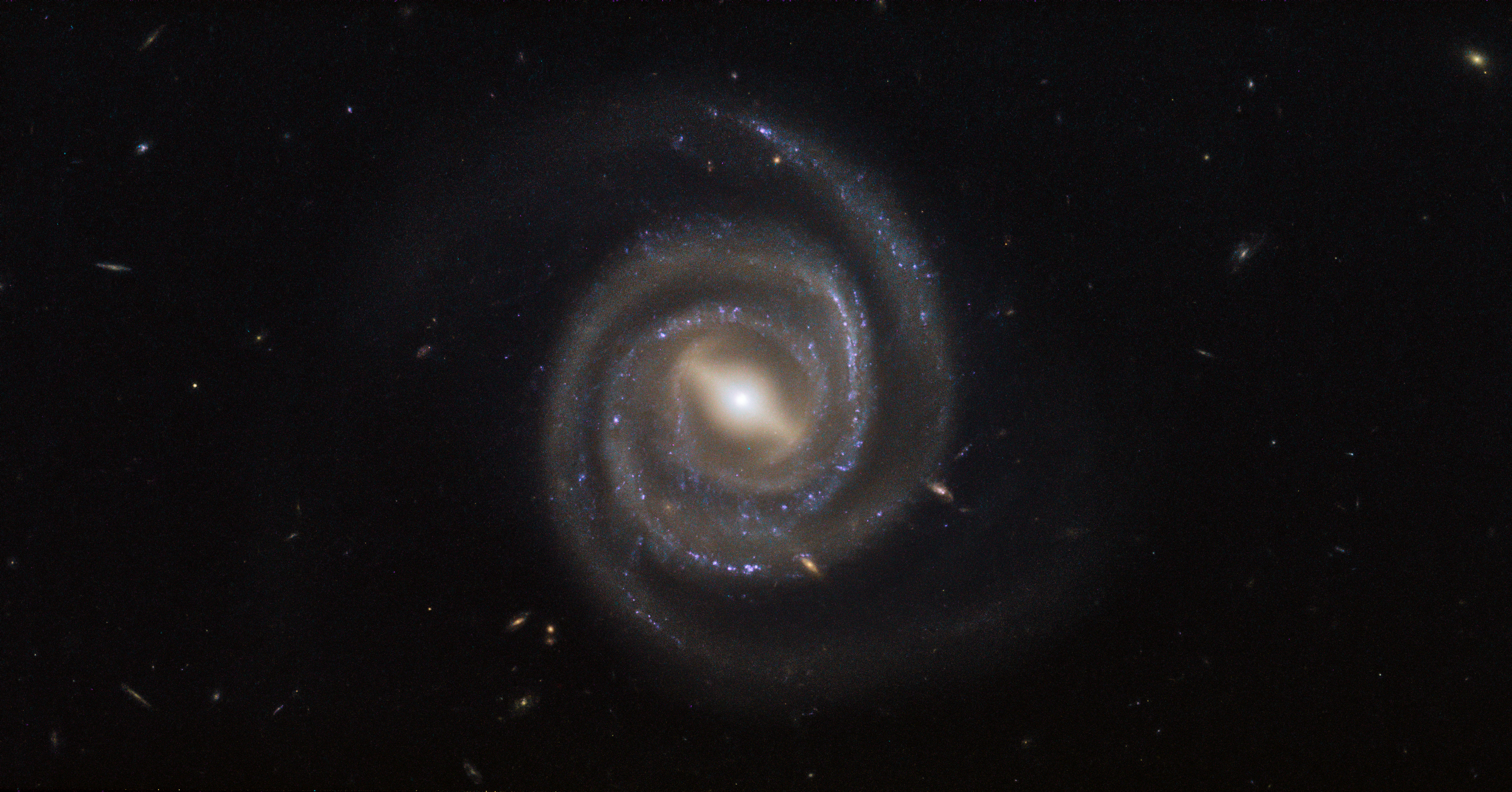
- Hubble Space Telescope image of UGC 6093

Observation data (J2000 epoch)
- Constellation: Leo
- Right ascension: 11^{h} 00^{m} 47.96^{s}
- Declination: 10° 43′ 41.30″
- Redshift: 0.036118
- Heliocentric radial velocity: 10,828 km/s
- Distance: 500 Mly (153 Mpc)
- Apparent magnitude (V): 14.7

Characteristics
- Type: SAB(rs)bc
- Size: 253,330 ly (77.71 kpc) (estimated)
- Apparent size (V): 0.94′ × 0.76′
- Notable features: Acts as a megamaser, hosts an AGN.

Other designations
- MCG+02-28-044, PGC 33198

UGC 6093 is a barred spiral galaxy located approximately 500 million light years (or about 153 megaparsecs) away from Earth in the constellation of Leo.

This galaxy is known to host an active galactic nucleus, which is caused by the accretion of matter by a supermassive black hole located at its center, thus causing it to emit huge amounts of radiation and making UGC 6093's core shine excessively. This galaxy is also a megamaser, which means that it acts as a giant astronomical laser generating microwaves rather than visible light. Just like UGC 12158 and NGC 6744, it is considered a Milky Way twin in appearance, with a similar central bar and spiral arm structure.

== See also ==
- UGC 12158
- Milky Way
