= NGC 2336 =

Galaxy in the constellation Camelopardalis

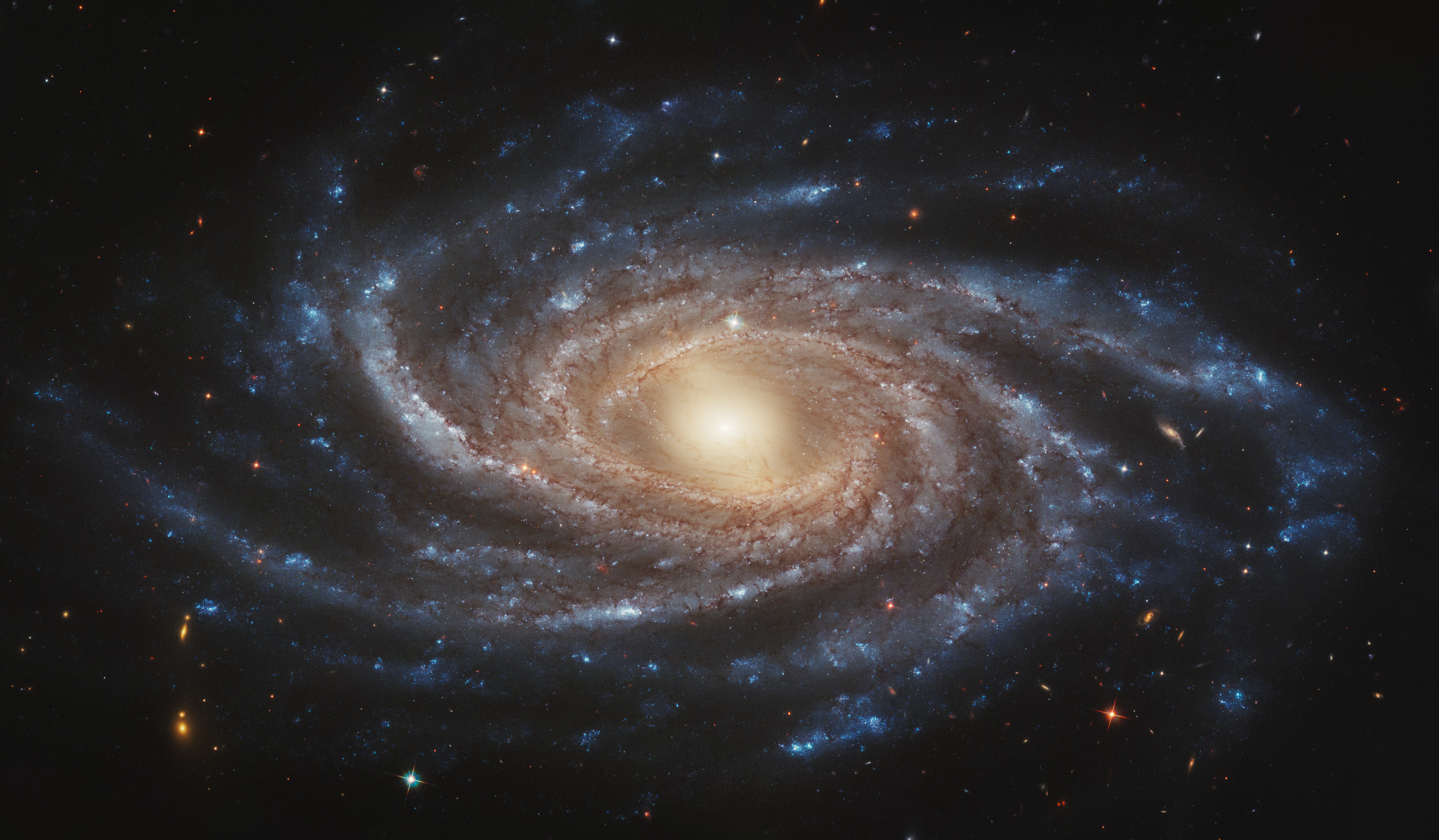
- NGC 2336 imaged by the Hubble Space Telescope

Observation data (J2000 epoch)
- Constellation: Camelopardalis
- Right ascension: 07^{h} 27^{m} 03.7437^{s}
- Declination: +80° 10′ 42.212″
- Redshift: 0.007352 +/- 0.000003
- Heliocentric radial velocity: 2204 ± 1 km/s
- Distance: 90.7 ± 28 Mly (27.8 ± 8.6 Mpc)
- Apparent magnitude (V): 10.3

Characteristics
- Type: SAB(r)bc
- Size: ~209,100 ly (64.12 kpc) (estimated)
- Apparent size (V): 7.1′ × 3.9′
- Notable features: Hosts AGN: Type II Seyfert Galaxy

Other designations
- IRAS 07184+8016, UGC 3809, MCG +13-06-006, PGC 21033, CGCG 348-034

NGC 2336 is a barred spiral galaxy located in the constellation Camelopardalis. It is located at a distance of about 100 million light years from Earth, which, given its apparent dimensions, means that NGC 2336 is about 200,000 light years across. It was discovered by Wilhelm Tempel in 1876.

== Characteristics ==
NGC 2336 is a barred spiral galaxy, featuring a small optical bar. At least 8 spiral arms, with numerous HII regions, emanate from the ring-like structure around the bar. This ring has a radius of approximately 34 arcseconds, which corresponds to 5.3 kpc at the distance of NGC 2336.

In the large arms of the galaxy have been observed 28 HII regions that may host young massive star clusters, and for two of them the nebular emission comprises most of the flux. Three of these HII areas have ages calculated to be 100 to 300 million years and have sizes between 300 and 600 parsecs. It is suggested they are star complexes that may coexist with younger ones. The most massive of the HII regions, number 13, has a mass estimated to be (550±169)×10^{4} M_{☉} and is 2,600 ly (810 pc) across. Observations in the ultraviolet showed 78 star forming regions, with two of them between the spiral arms and six at the galaxy ring. Their size is comparable to NGC 604, one of the largest nebulae in the Local Group. Star formation is more intense in the inner parts of the arms and at the ring.

Scattered dust lanes which do not fit into a spiral structure have been observed in the nuclear region of the galaxy. No emission has been detected in the radiowaves and HI and Ha imaging of the nucleus of NGC 2336. The nucleus is small, with an apparent diameter of 5 arcseconds, while the bulge is large, with a radius of 17 arcseconds. In the centre of NGC 2336 lies a supermassive black hole whose mass is estimated to be 30 million (10^{7.5}) M_{☉} based on Ks bulge luminosity.

NGC 2336 also hosts an active Type II Seyfert galactic nucleus, which was discovered by the Ultraviolet Imaging Telescope (UVIT)

== Supernova ==
One supernova has been observed in NGC 2336. SN 1987L (Type Ia, mag. 14.2) was discovered by American amateur astronomer James Dana Patchick on 16 August 1987. He used a home built 17.5" Dobsonian reflecting telescope for the visual discovery. The supernova was found as part of a team effort known as 'SUNSEARCH', started by Steve H. Lucas. Spectrography performed by William Herschel Telescope on 20–21 October 1987 concluded that it was a Type Ia supernova (Note: Some sources incorrectly list this supernova as Type II.) with its maximum approximately 100 days before.

== Nearby galaxies ==
NGC 2336 is the foremost galaxy of a small galaxy group known as the NGC 2336 group. It forms a non-interacting pair with IC 467, which lies 20 arcminutes away.

== Gallery ==
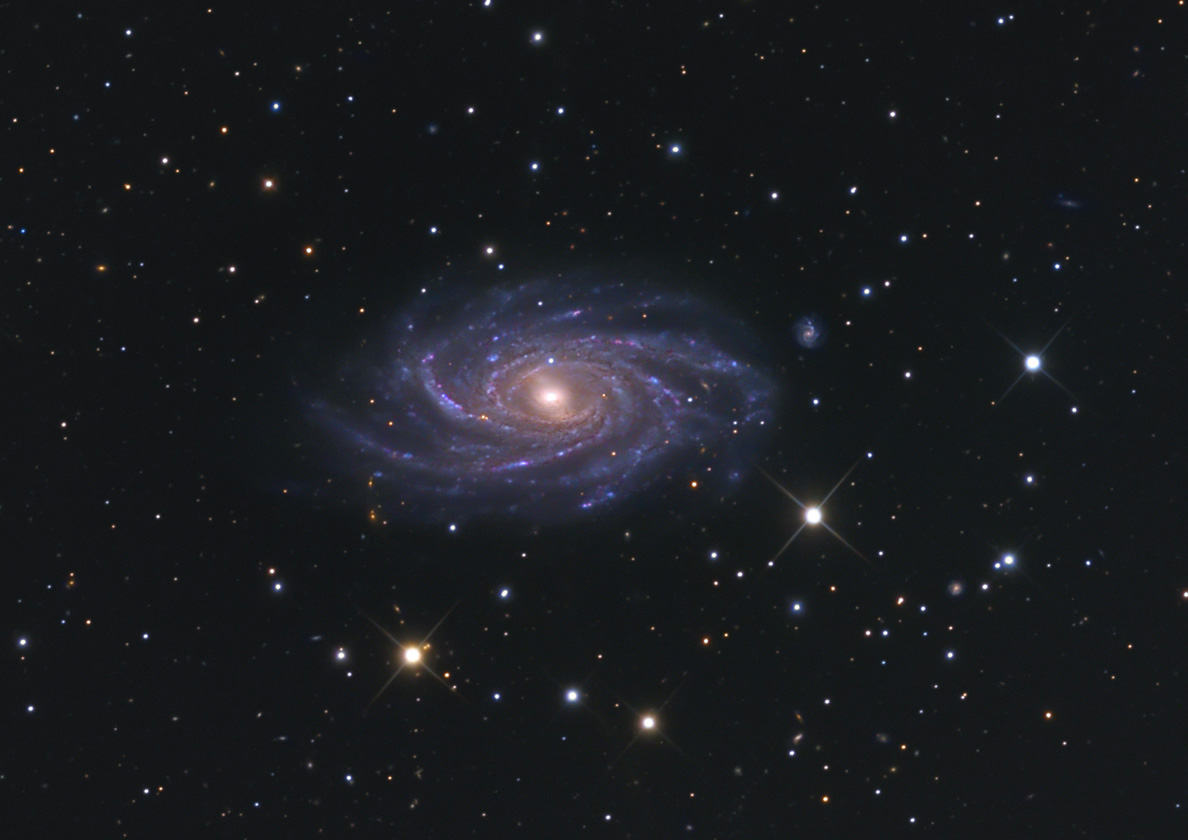
NGC 2336 by the Mount Lemmon Observatory

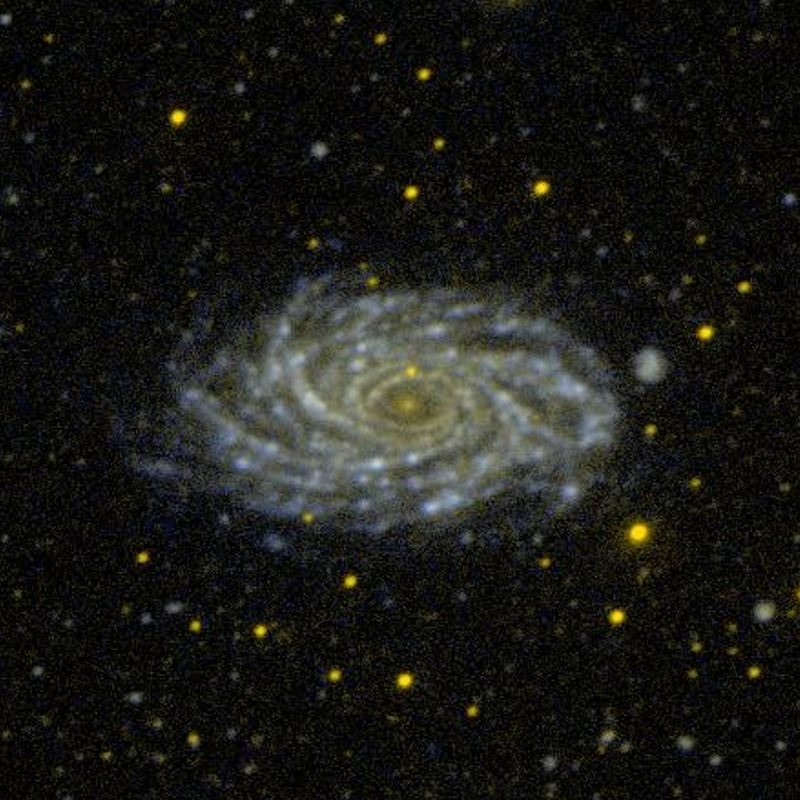
NGC 2336 by GALEX

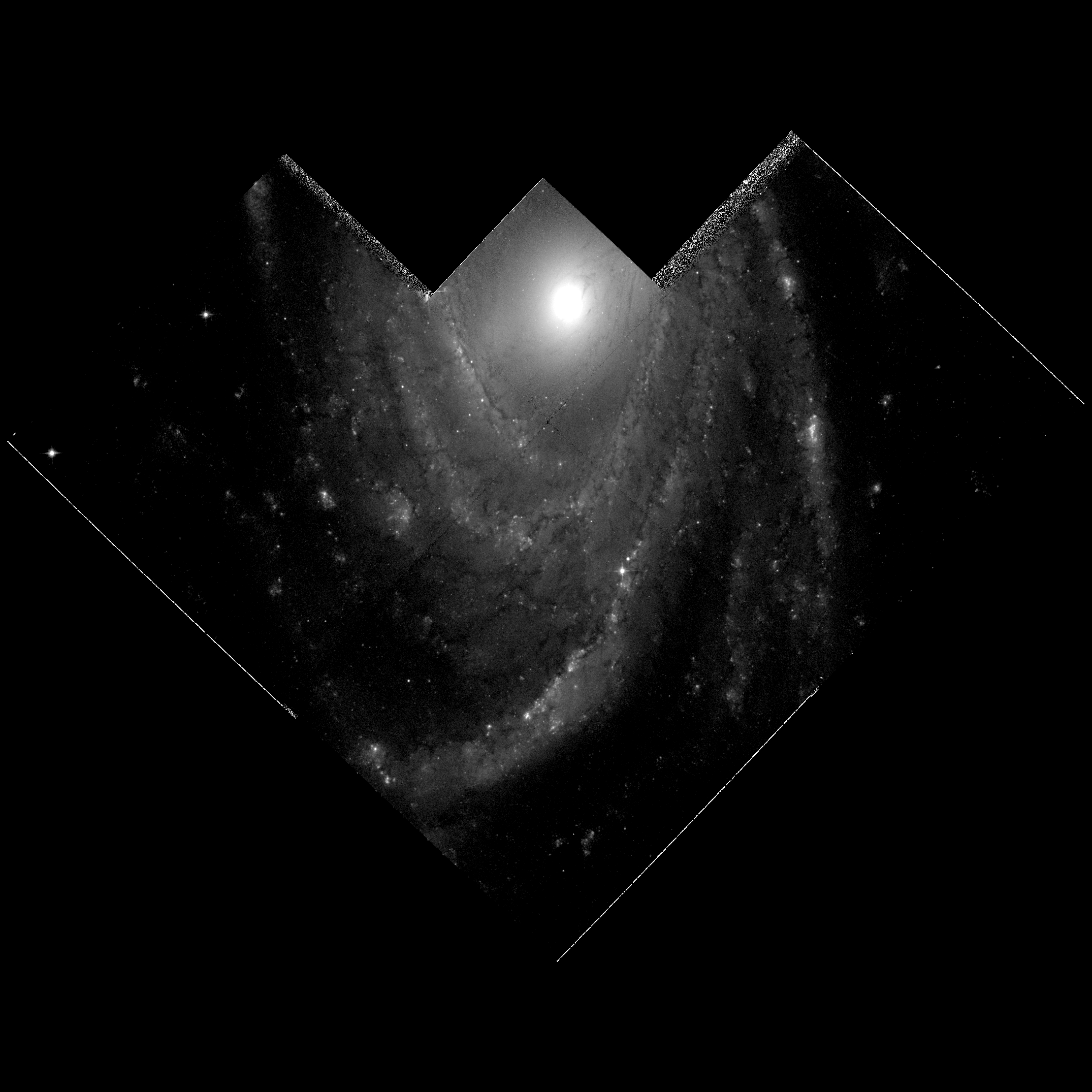
NGC 2336 by the HST

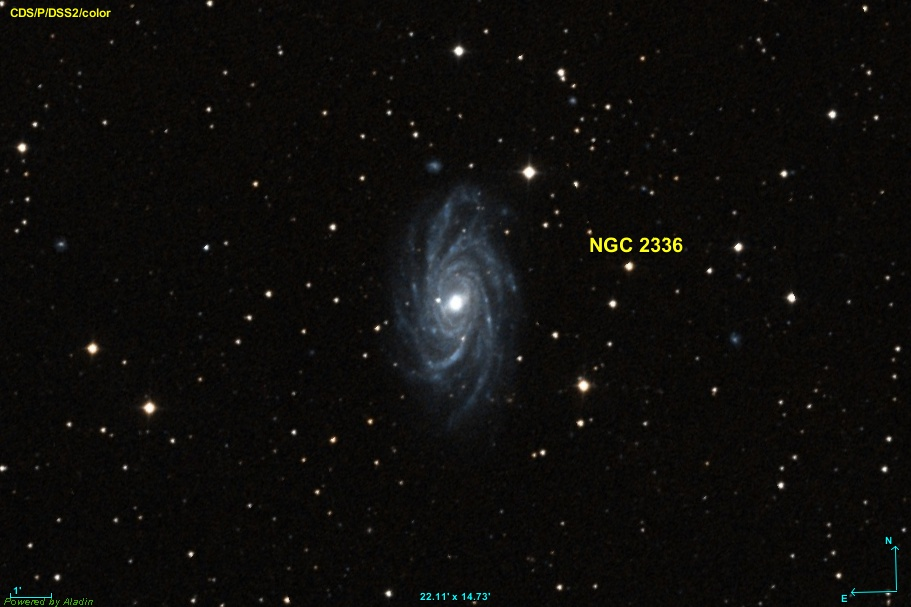
DSS

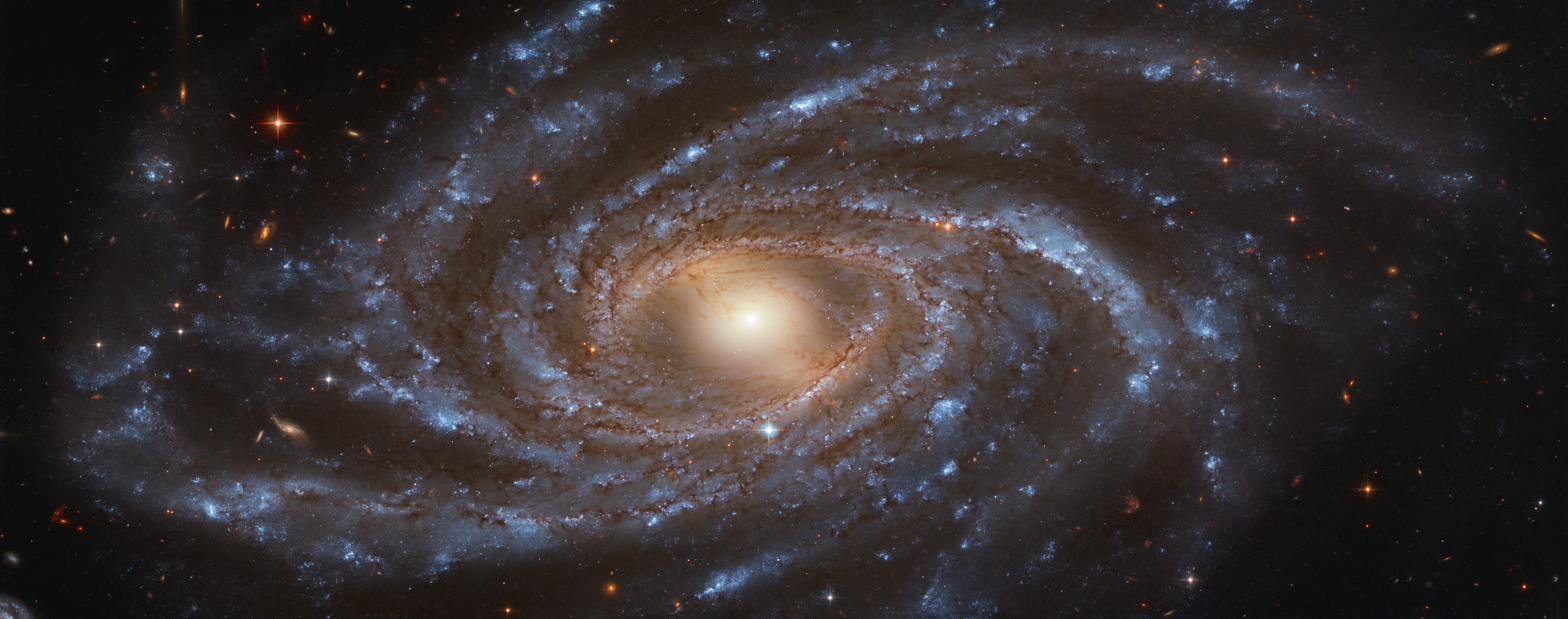
NGC 2336 is the quintessential galaxy — big, beautiful and blue — and it is captured here by the NASA/ESA Hubble Space Telescope.

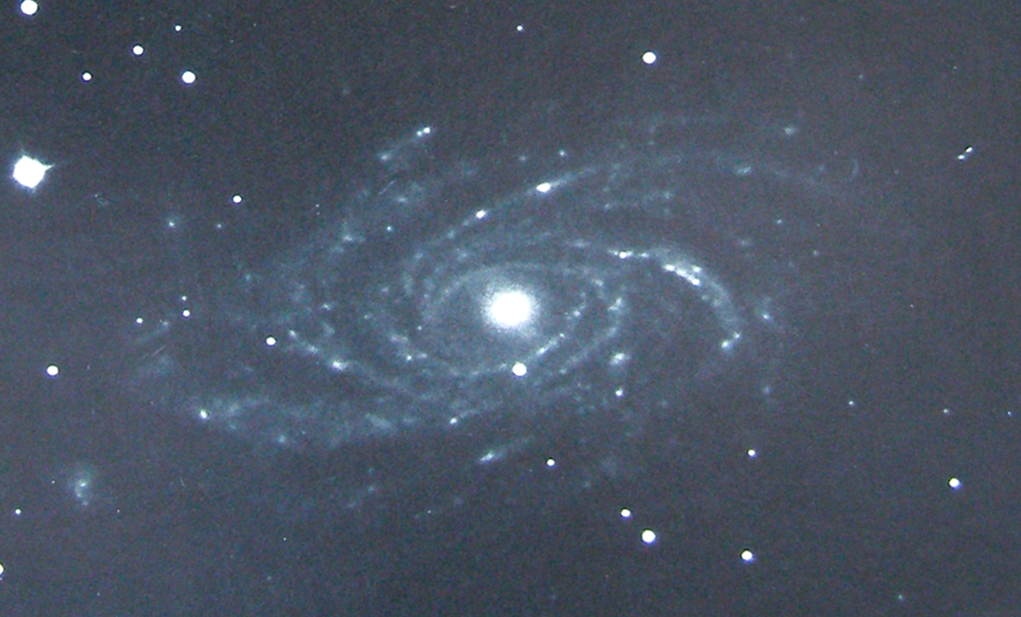
NGC 2336 by the Naval Observatory 61" Reflector

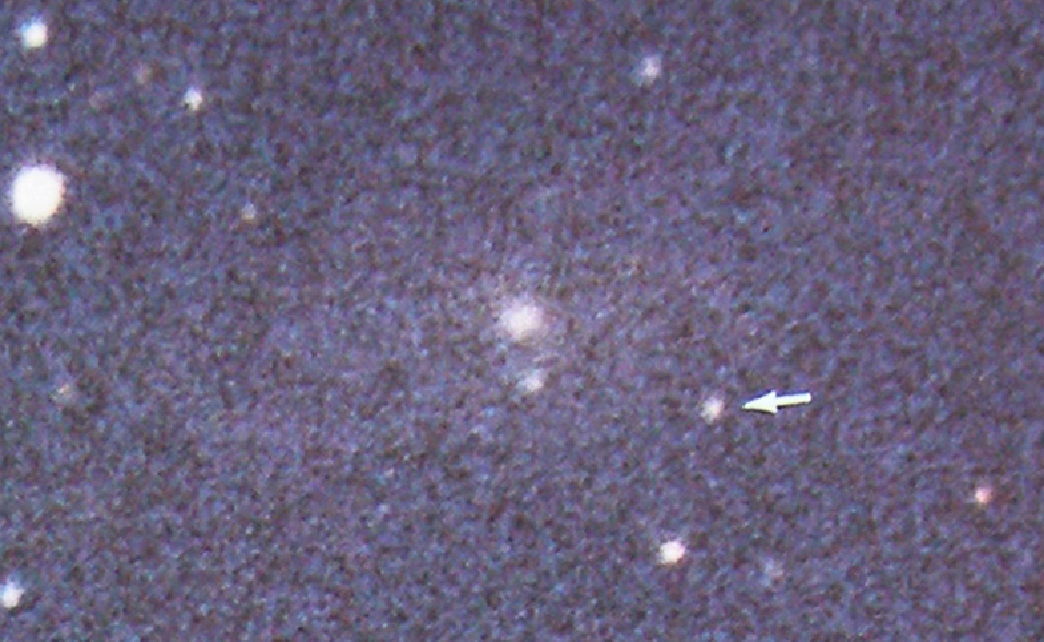
NGC 2336 and SN 1987L, August 26, 1987 - by Jack Newton

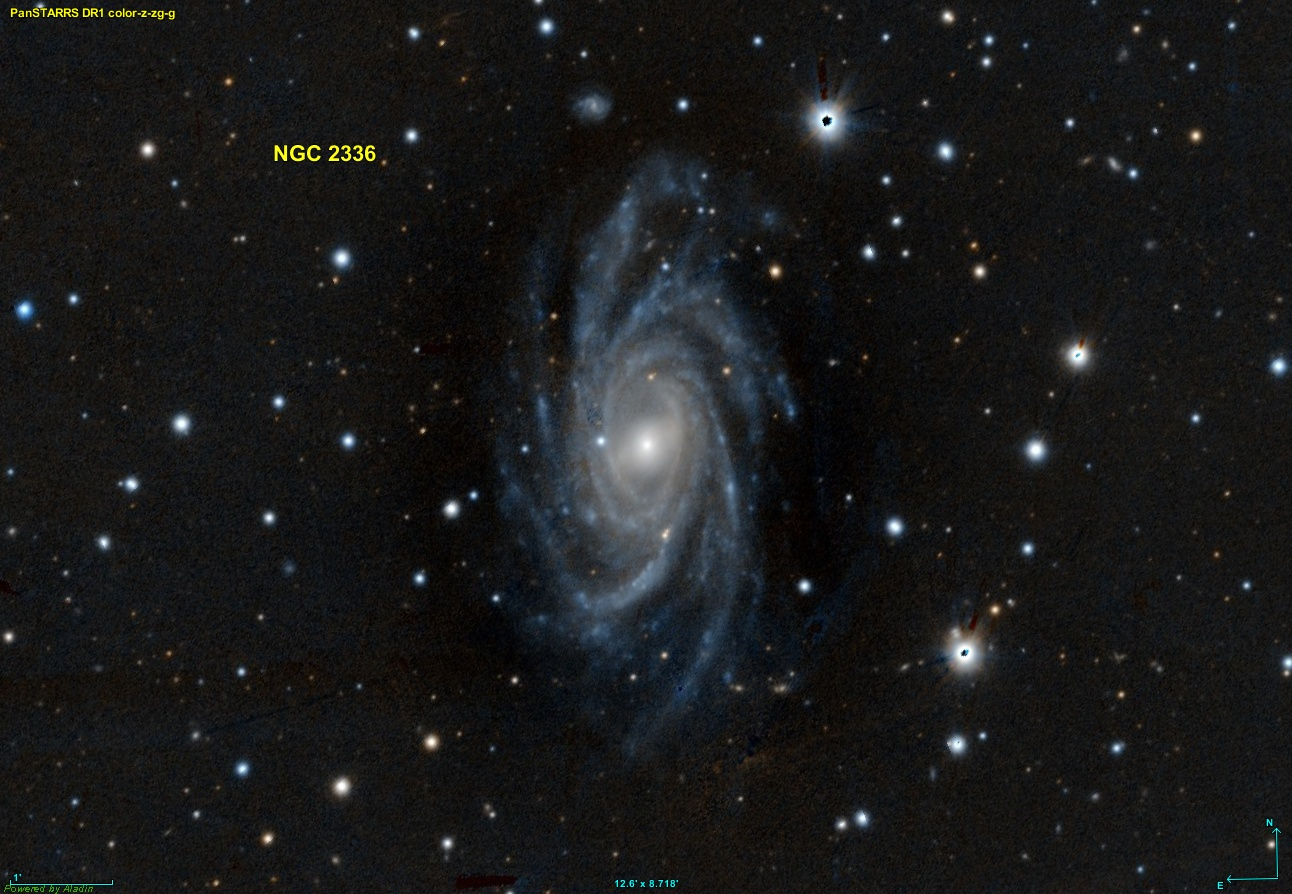
Pan-STARRS

== See also ==
- List of NGC objects (2001–3000)
