= SPT0418−47 =

Old and extremely distant galaxy in the constellation Horologium

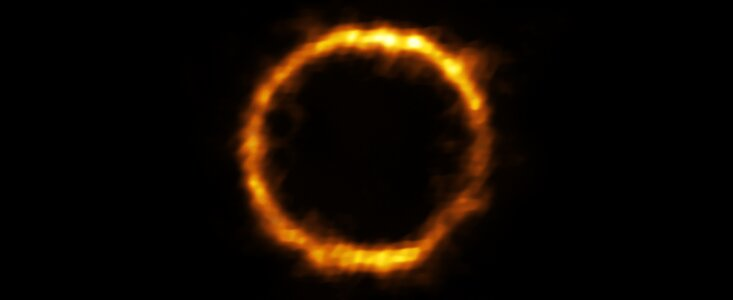
- SPT0418-47 as seen by the ALMA telescope.

Observation data (J2000 epoch)
- Constellation: Horologium
- Right ascension: 04^{h} 18^{m} 39.270^{s}
- Declination: −47° 51′ 50.10″
- Redshift: 4.2248
- Heliocentric radial velocity: 278605 km/s
- Distance: 12 billion light-years (light travel distance); 24 billion light-years (present comoving distance)

Other designations
- SPT-S J041839−4751.8, SPT-S J041839−4751.9 BG, [BAA2017] SPT0418−47

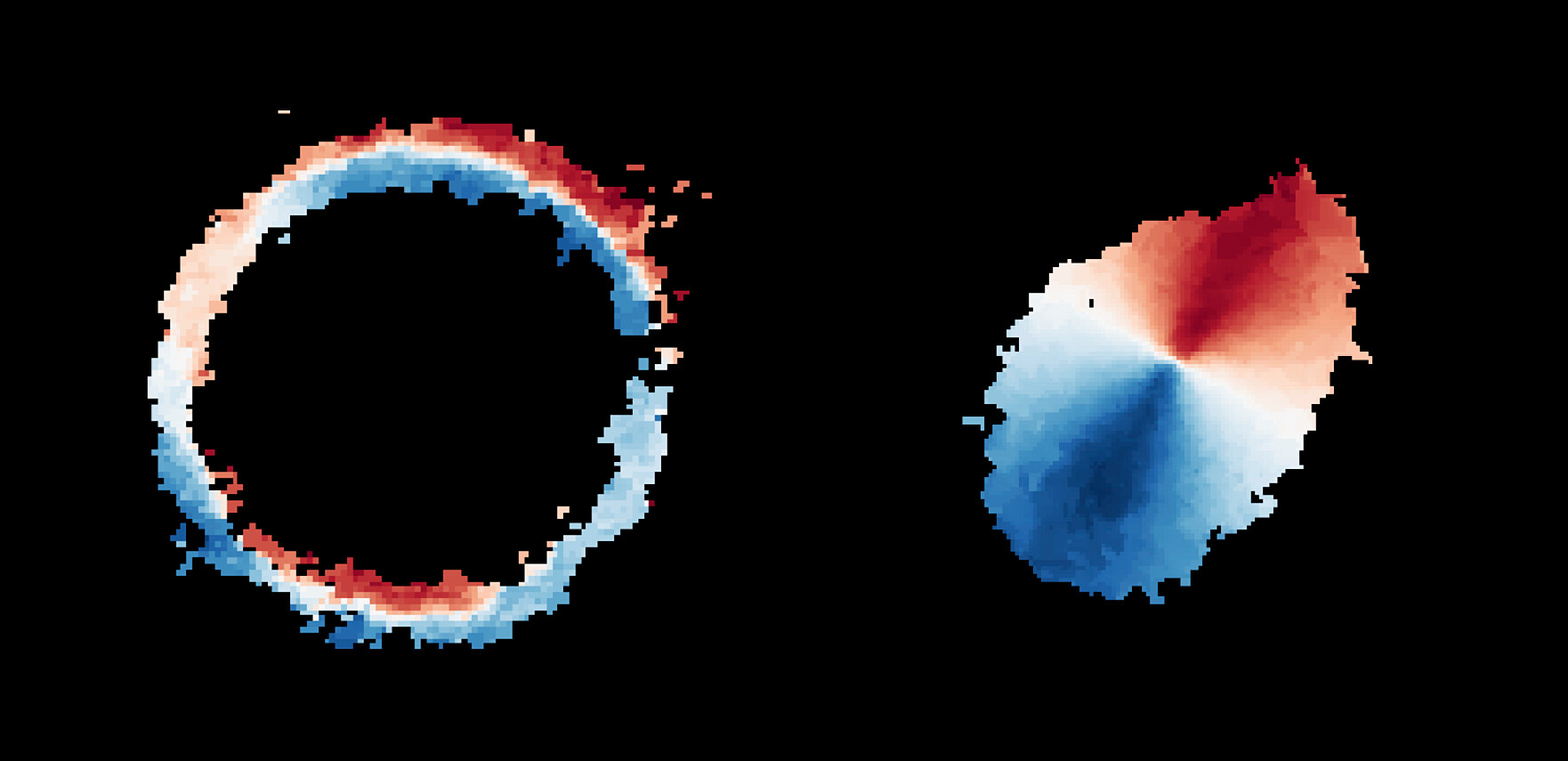
Motion of the gas in SPT0418-47 (reconstructed). The gas moving away from the Earth is shown in red. The gas moving towards the observer is shown in blue.

SPT0418−47 is a gravitationally lensed, high-redshift, dusty star-forming galaxy, discovered with the South Pole Telescope. Observations with NASA's James Webb Space Telescope (JWST) have revealed the presence of a companion galaxy, (designated SPT0418-SE) which may indicate that SPT0418−47 is a merging system of galaxies.

In June 2023 detection of organic molecules in SPT0418−47 using the Webb telescope was announced.
