= Type Iax supernova =

Dwarf star remnant of a supernova

A Type Iax supernova is a kind of thermonuclear supernova with many similarities to Type Ia supernovae, but can leave behind a remnant star, known as a zombie star, rather than completely dispersing the white dwarf. Type Iax supernovae are similar to Type Ia, but have a lower ejecta velocity and lower luminosity. Type Iax supernovae may occur at a rate between 5 and 30 percent of the Type Ia supernova rate. As of April 2026, at least 65 supernovae had been identified in this class.

In a binary system consisting of a white dwarf and a helium companion star, the white dwarf strips away material from its companion. Normally the white dwarf would eventually reach a critical mass, where fusion reactions would make the star explode, completely unbinding the system. However, a Type Iax supernova only ejects part of the white dwarf's mass, leaving a gravitationally bound remnant star.

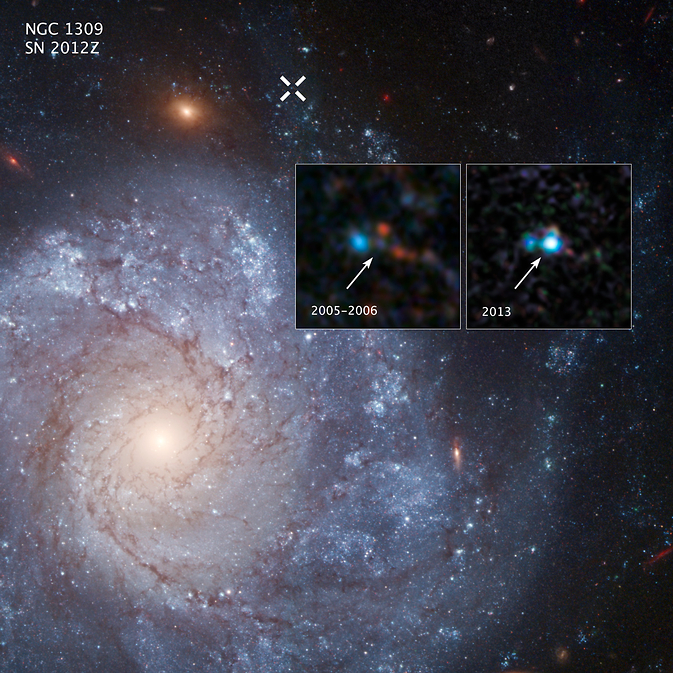
The two inset images show before-and-after images captured by NASA's Hubble Space Telescope of Supernova 2012Z in the spiral galaxy NGC 1309. The white X at the top of the main image marks the location of the supernova in the galaxy.

== Candidate observed instances ==
Supernova SN 2012Z in the galaxy NGC 1309 is thought to be of Type Iax, and was discovered by Brad Cenko, Weidong Li, and Alex Filippenko using the Katzman Automatic Imaging Telescope on 2012 January 29.15 UT as part of a supernova search at Lick Observatory.

The proposed formation scenario for SN 2012Z is that the original system at the heart of the supernova was a binary pair of large, but otherwise ordinary main sequence stars. The more massive of the binary stars lost substantial amounts of its hydrogen and helium to its smaller companion, and became a white dwarf. The newly engorged companion star then evolved into an enlarged stage, whose outer layers engulfed the white dwarf. The outer hydrogen layers of the overlapping stars were then ejected, leaving behind a still-active helium core and the white dwarf. In turn, the white dwarf drained back some matter from the remaining companion star, until the white dwarf became so unstable that it exploded as a supernova, with the former helium core left behind as a remnant zombie star.

There were images of the area from before the supernova, allowing before and after images, and the process of the supernova to be studied. To test the zombie star hypothesis, the area was observed again a few years after the event. The authors found that the decline of the light curve was consistent with the existence of a radioactively-heated bound remnant, but that it was difficult to come up with a model that could explain the whole light curve.

This discovery is a milestone in a decades long search by astronomers for such an occurrence; the observation of SN 2012Z was the first time astrophysicists were able to identify a star system that later went to a supernova of this type.

SN 2008ha may be a Type Iax supernova, but significantly weaker than SN 2012Z.

On 13 September 2024, BlackGEM discovered an astronomical transient, designated SN 2024vjm, in NGC 6744. After initial spectral analysis the star was classified as a peculiar nova, but further observations showed the object to be a faint Type Iax supernova, likely the closest known of this type.

== SN 1181 ==
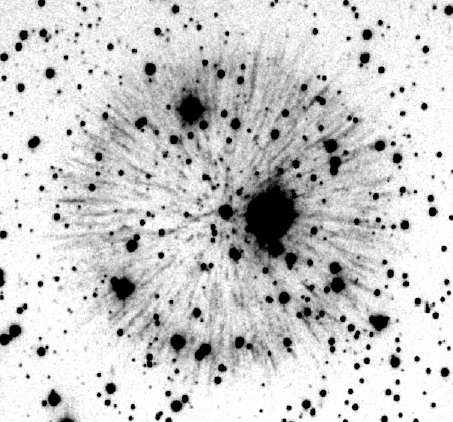
Pa 30 and the central star IRAS 00500+6713, which is a zombie star

SN 1181 was observed by Chinese and Japanese astronomers in 1181 AD. The amateur astronomer Dana Patchick first discovered the nebula Pa 30 with WISE. The nebula Pa 30 was connected to SN 1181 by astronomers and has the central star IRAS 00500+6713. The central star is an oxygen-rich Wolf–Rayet star and is the result of a merger of a CO (carbon-oxygen) white dwarf and an ONe (oxygen–neon–magnesium) white dwarf in a Type Iax supernova. This makes IRAS 00500+6713 a confirmed zombie star. Pa 30 and IRAS 00500+6713 is the only known remnant of a Type Iax in the Milky Way.

== LP 40-365 stars ==
LP 40-365, as well as a few other low-mass white dwarfs, were found to have an atmospheric composition dominated by neon, oxygen and magnesium. Other elements were also detected. The composition suggests that these objects were the result of a thermonuclear explosion, possibly a type Iax supernova. A electron-capture supernova is another possibility.
