= NGC 7312 =

Galaxy in the constellation Pegasus

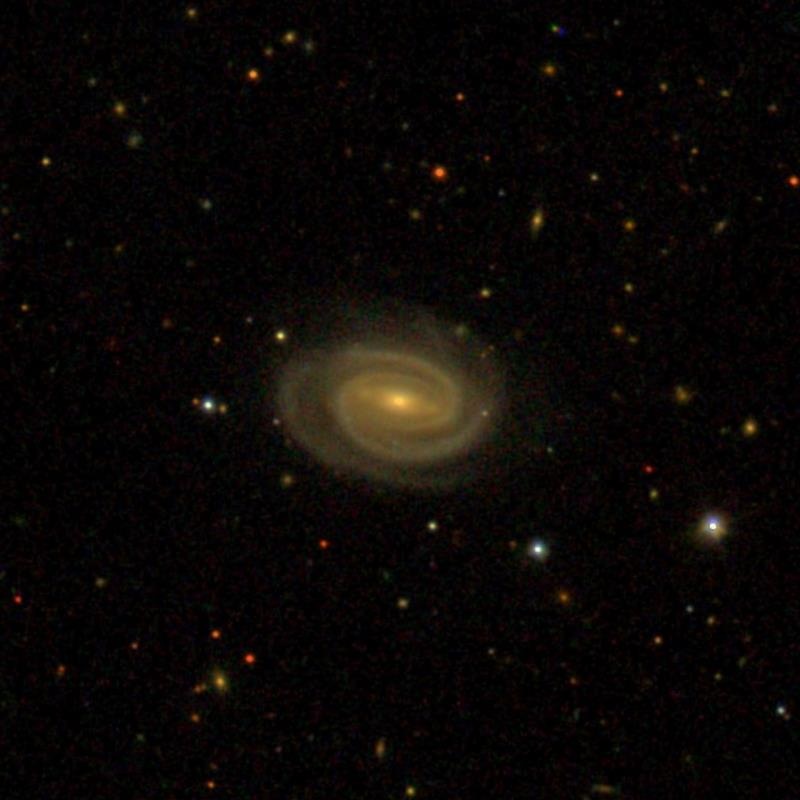
- The barred spiral galaxy NGC 7312

Observation data (J2000 epoch)
- Constellation: Pegasus
- Right ascension: 22^{h} 34^{m} 34.7889^{s}
- Declination: +05° 49′ 02.579″
- Redshift: 0.027609
- Heliocentric radial velocity: 8277 ± 1 km/s
- Distance: 380.6 ± 26.7 Mly (116.68 ± 8.18 Mpc)
- Apparent magnitude (V): 13.4

Characteristics
- Type: SB(s)b
- Size: ~225,000 ly (68.97 kpc) (estimated)
- Apparent size (V): 1.5′ × 0.8′

Other designations
- 2MASX J22343478+0549025, UGC 12083, MCG +01-57-010, PGC 69198, CGCG 404-023

NGC 7312 is a barred spiral galaxy in the constellation of Pegasus. Its velocity with respect to the cosmic microwave background is 7911 ± 26 km/s, which corresponds to a Hubble distance of 116.68 ± 8.18 Mpc (~381 million light-years). It was discovered by German astronomer Albert Marth on 30 October 1863.

According to Steven D. Peterson, NGC 7312 forms a galaxy pair with NGC 7311. The Hubble distance to NGC 7311 is 61.33 ± 4.31 Mpc (~200 million light-years), which is much closer than NGC 7312, and therefore the pairing is purely optical.

== Supernovae ==
Two supernovae have been observed in NGC 7312:

- PSN J22343424+0548478 (Type II, mag 16.6) was discovered by E. Weinberg, R. Post, Jack Newton, and Tim Puckett on 17 September 2015.
- SN 2024ixe (Type IIb, mag. 19.7) was discovered by the Catalina Real-time Transient Survey (SNHunt) on 15 May 2024.

== See also ==
- List of NGC objects (7001–7840)
