= UGC 4798 =

Galaxy in the constellation Lynx

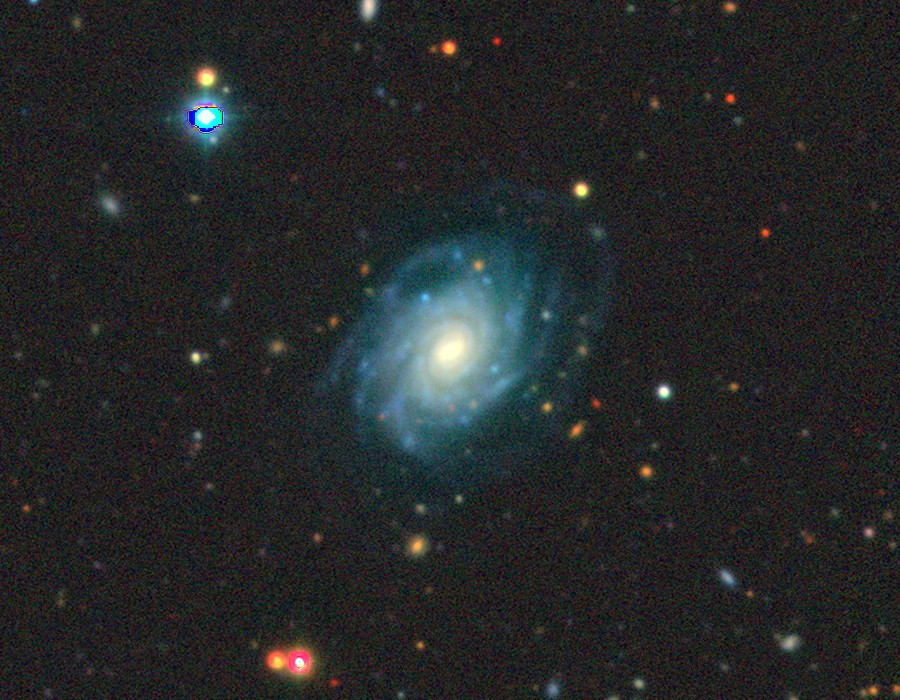
- UGC 4798 imaged by Legacy Surveys

Observation data (J2000 epoch)
- Constellation: Lynx
- Right ascension: 09^{h} 08^{m} 42.6378^{s}
- Declination: +44° 48′ 38.394″
- Redshift: 0.026739±0.0000123
- Heliocentric radial velocity: 8,016±4 km/s
- Distance: 394.9 ± 27.7 Mly (121.07 ± 8.48 Mpc)
- Apparent magnitude (V): 15.0g

Characteristics
- Type: SAcd
- Size: ~127,100 ly (38.96 kpc) (estimated)
- Apparent size (V): 0.92′ × 0.66′

Other designations
- 2MASX J09084267+4448379, MCG +08-17-038, PGC 025726, CGCG 238-013

UGC 4798 is a spiral galaxy in the constellation of Lynx. Its velocity with respect to the cosmic microwave background is 8,209±14 km/s, which corresponds to a Hubble distance of 394.9 ± 27.7 Mly (121.07 ± 8.48 Mpc).. The first known reference to this galaxy comes from Part 1 of the Morphological Catalogue of Galaxies, published in 1962, where it is listed as MCG +08-17-038.

== Supernovae ==
Five supernovae have been observed in UGC 4798:

- SN 2005mf (Type Ic, mag. 17.4) was discovered by the THCA Supernova Survey on 25 December 2005.
- SN 2013V (Type Ia, mag. 17.8) was discovered by T. Crowley, Jack Newton, and Tim Puckett on 6 January 2013.
- PSN J09084248+4448132 (Type Ia, mag. 15.8) was discovered by the Catalina Real-time Transient Survey and Stan Howerton on 26 October 2014.
- SN 2019cad (Type Ic, mag. 18.75) was discovered by the Zwicky Transient Facility on 17 March 2019. This supernova was double-peaked and resembled SN 2005bf.
- SN 2025ane (Type II, mag. 18.2563) was discovered by the Zwicky Transient Facility on 31 January 2025.
