= NGC 7499 =

Galaxy in the constellation Pisces

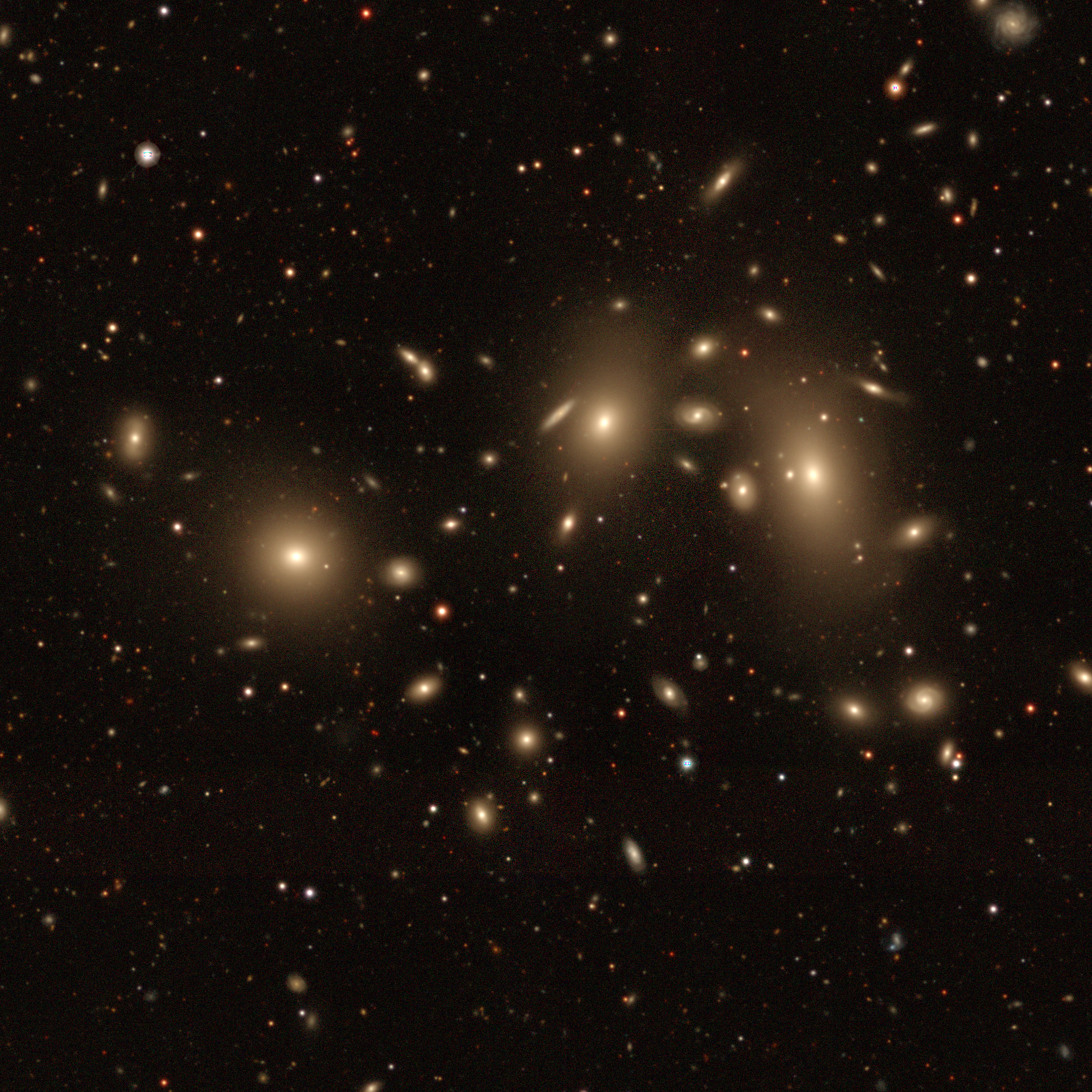
- From right to left: NGC 7499, NGC 7501 and NGC 7503

Observation data (J2000 epoch)
- Constellation: Pisces
- Right ascension: 23^{h} 10^{m} 22.375^{s}
- Declination: +07° 34′ 50.20″
- Redshift: 0.03947
- Heliocentric radial velocity: 11600 km/s
- Distance: 546.8 ± 38.3 Mly (167.64 ± 11.75 Mpc)
- Apparent magnitude (V): 12.98
- Apparent magnitude (B): 14.13

Characteristics
- Type: SA0^{0}(s):
- Size: ~262,200 ly (80.39 kpc) (estimated)

Other designations
- UGC 12397, MCG +01-59-005, PGC 70608, CGCG 406-007

NGC 7499 is an unbarred lenticular galaxy within the constellation Pisces. NGC 7499 is its New General Catalogue designation. It was discovered on September 2, 1864 by the astronomer Albert Marth.

== Supernovae ==
Two supernovae have been observed in NGC 7499:

- SN 1986M (Type Ib, mag. 16.5) was discovered by E. Cappellaro and Leonida Rosino on 7 December 1986.
- PSN J23102264+0735202 (Type Ia, mag. 17.9) was discovered by Robert Gagliano, Dick Post, Jack Newton, and Tim Puckett on 6 September 2015.

== See also ==
- List of NGC objects (7001–7840)
