= NGC 1184 =

Galaxy in the constellation Cepheus

- NGC 1184 imaged by SDSS

Observation data (J2000 epoch)
- Constellation: Cepheus
- Right ascension: 03^{h} 16^{m} 45.1631^{s}
- Declination: +80° 47′ 36.130″
- Redshift: 0.007812±0.0000630
- Heliocentric radial velocity: 2,342±19 km/s
- Distance: 109.2 ± 7.8 Mly (33.47 ± 2.38 Mpc)
- Group or cluster: nest 101283
- Apparent magnitude (V): 13.44

Characteristics
- Type: S0/a
- Size: ~143,100 ly (43.86 kpc) (estimated)
- Apparent size (V): 2.8′ × 0.6′

Other designations
- 2MASX J03164489+8047358, UGC 2583, MCG +13-03-002, PGC 12174, CGCG 346-002

NGC 1184 is a lenticular galaxy in the constellation of Cepheus. Its velocity with respect to the cosmic microwave background is 2,269±20 km/s, which corresponds to a Hubble distance of 109.2 ± 7.8 Mly (33.47 ± 2.38 Mpc). It was discovered by German-British astronomer William Herschel on 16 September 1787.

NGC 1184 has a possible active galactic nucleus, i.e. it has a compact region at the center of a galaxy that emits a significant amount of energy across the electromagnetic spectrum, with characteristics indicating that this luminosity is not produced by the stars.

== Galaxy group ==
NGC 1184 is member of a small galaxy group known as nest 101283. The other two galaxies in the group are UGC 2519 and UGC 2620.

== Supernovae ==
Two supernovae have been observed in NGC 1184:

- SN 2018isq (Type Ia, mag. 17.7) was discovered by R. Gagliano, R. Post, E. Weinberg, Jack Newton, and Tim Puckett on 20 November 2018.
- SN 2026aeiv (Type Ia-91bg-like, mag. 19.081) was discovered by ATLAS on 5 October 2026.

== See also ==
- List of NGC objects (1001–2000)
