= NGC 3408 =

Galaxy in the constellation Ursa Major

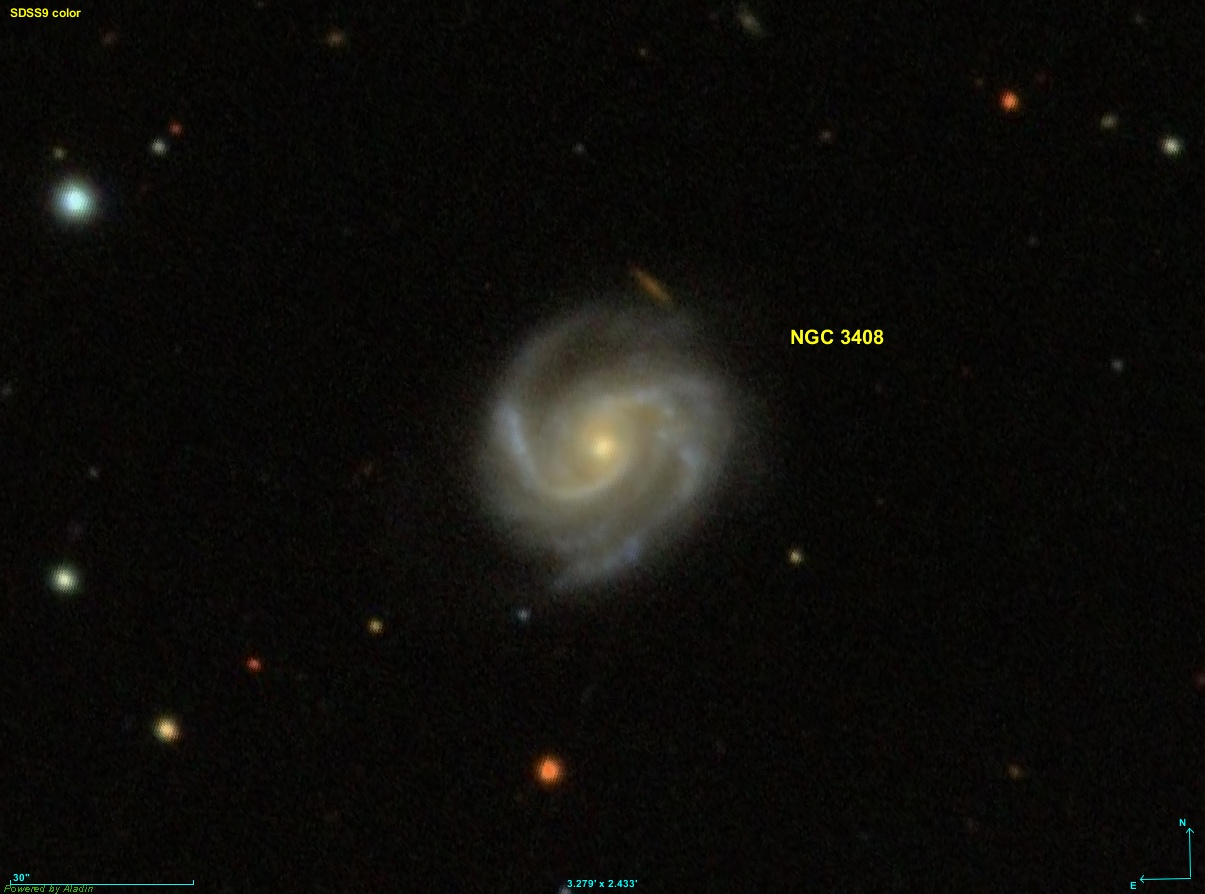
- NGC 3408 imaged by SDSS

Observation data (J2000 epoch)
- Constellation: Ursa Major
- Right ascension: 10^{h} 52^{m} 11.6721^{s}
- Declination: +58° 26′ 17.272″
- Redshift: 0.031582±0.0000107
- Heliocentric radial velocity: 9,468±3 km/s
- Distance: 462.8 ± 32.4 Mly (141.91 ± 9.94 Mpc)
- Apparent magnitude (V): 14.3g

Characteristics
- Type: Sc
- Size: ~175,800 ly (53.90 kpc) (estimated)
- Apparent size (V): 0.85′ × 0.75′

Other designations
- IRAS 10490+5842, 2MASX J10521167+5826168, UGC 5977, MCG +10-16-016, PGC 32616, CGCG 291-006

NGC 3408 is a spiral galaxy in the constellation of Ursa Major. Its velocity with respect to the cosmic microwave background is 9,621±11 km/s, which corresponds to a Hubble distance of 462.8 ± 32.4 Mly (141.91 ± 9.94 Mpc). It was discovered by German-British astronomer William Herschel on 8 April 1793.

NGC 3408 is a radio galaxy, i.e. it has giant regions of radio emission extending well beyond its visible structure.

== Supernova ==
One supernova has been observed in NGC 3408:

- SN 2018ka (Type Ia, mag. 19.4) was discovered by R. Gagliano, R. Post, E. Weinberg, Jack B. Newton, and Tim Puckett on 17 January 2018.

== See also ==
- List of NGC objects (3001–4000)
