= NGC 6373 =

Galaxy in the constellation Draco

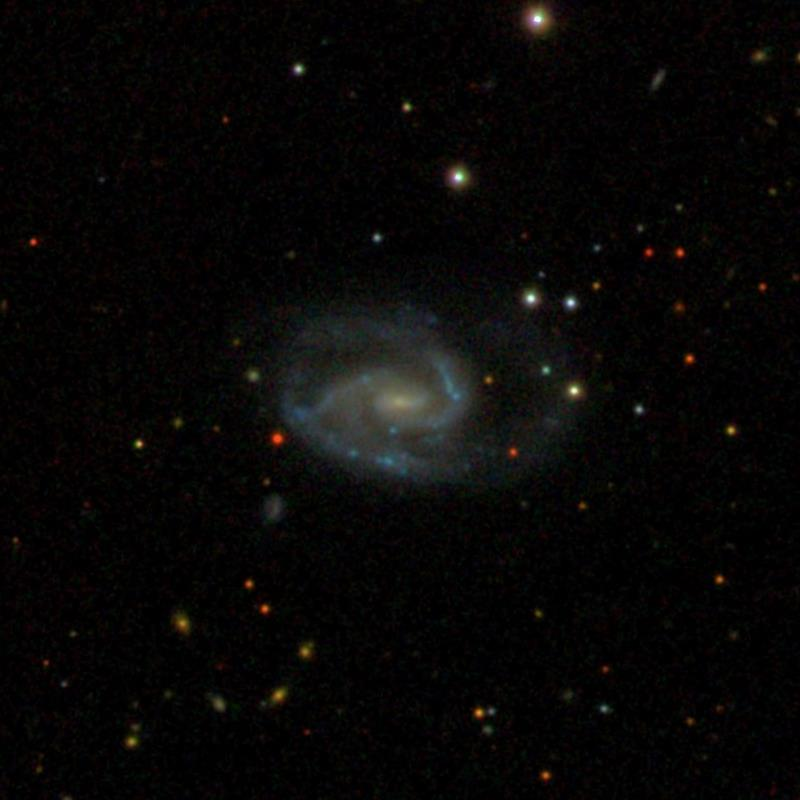
- NGC 6373 imaged by SDSS

Observation data (J2000 epoch)
- Constellation: Draco
- Right ascension: 17^{h} 24^{m} 08.0659^{s}
- Declination: +58° 59′ 42.227″
- Redshift: 0.011061±0.000007
- Heliocentric radial velocity: 3320±9 km/s
- Galactocentric velocity: 3516±2 km/s
- Distance: 157.2 ± 11.0 Mly (48.19 ± 3.37 Mpc)
- Apparent magnitude (V): 15.68
- Absolute magnitude (V): -17.60 +/- 0.50

Characteristics
- Type: SAB(s)c
- Size: ~83,800 ly (25.70 kpc) (estimated)
- Apparent size (V): 1.30′ × 1.0′

Other designations
- IRAS F17233+5902, UGC 10850, MCG +10-25-023, PGC 60220, CGCG 300-022
- References: NASA/IPAC extragalactic datatbase, http://spider.seds.org/

NGC 6373 is a barred spiral galaxy located in the constellation Draco. It is designated as SAB(s)c in the galaxy morphological classification scheme and was discovered by the American astronomer Lewis A. Swift on 13 June 1885.

== Supernovae ==
Two supernovae have been observed in NGC 6373:

- SN 2001ad (Type II, mag. 17.4) was discovered by the Beijing Astronomical Observatory (BAO) on 11 March 2001.
- SN 2012an (Type IIb, mag. 17.4) was discovered by Jack Newton and Tim Puckett on 21 February 2012.

== See also ==
- List of NGC objects (6001–7000)
