= NGC 4172 =

Galaxy in the constellation Ursa Major

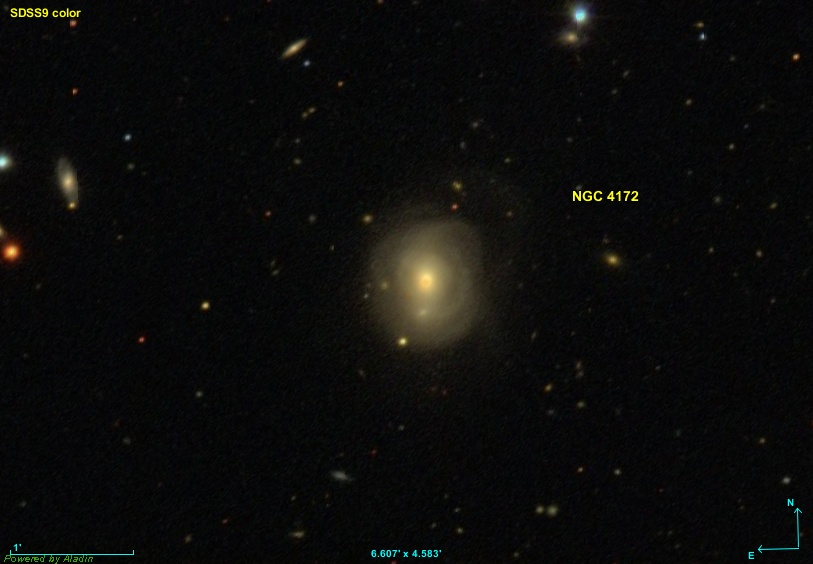
- NGC 4172 imaged by SDSS

Observation data (J2000 epoch)
- Constellation: Ursa Major
- Right ascension: 12^{h} 12^{m} 14.9210^{s}
- Declination: +56° 10′ 39.053″
- Redshift: 0.030983±0.00000344
- Heliocentric radial velocity: 9,289±1 km/s
- Distance: 431.86 ± 14.35 Mly (132.409 ± 4.400 Mpc)
- Apparent magnitude (V): 13.9g

Characteristics
- Type: S
- Size: ~184,400 ly (56.55 kpc) (estimated)
- Apparent size (V): 1.04′ × 0.98′

Other designations
- 2MASX J12121490+5610386, UGC 7205, MCG +09-20-109, PGC 38887, CGCG 269-039

NGC 4172 is a spiral galaxy in the constellation of Ursa Major. Its velocity with respect to the cosmic microwave background is 9,449±11 km/s, which corresponds to a Hubble distance of 454.6 ± 31.8 Mly (139.37 ± 9.76 Mpc). Additionally, 11 non-redshift measurements give a closer mean distance of 431.86 ± 14.35 Mly (132.409 ± 4.400 Mpc). It was discovered by German-British astronomer William Herschel on 14 April 1789.

NGC 4172 is a LINER galaxy, i.e. a galaxy whose nucleus has an emission spectrum characterized by broad lines of weakly ionized atoms.

== Supernova ==
One supernova has been observed in NGC 4172:

- SN 2006az (Type Ia, mag. 17.1) was discovered by Jack B. Newton, L. Cox, and Tim Puckett on 23 March 2006.

== See also ==
- List of NGC objects (4001–5000)
