= NGC 820 =

Spiral galaxy in the constellation Aries

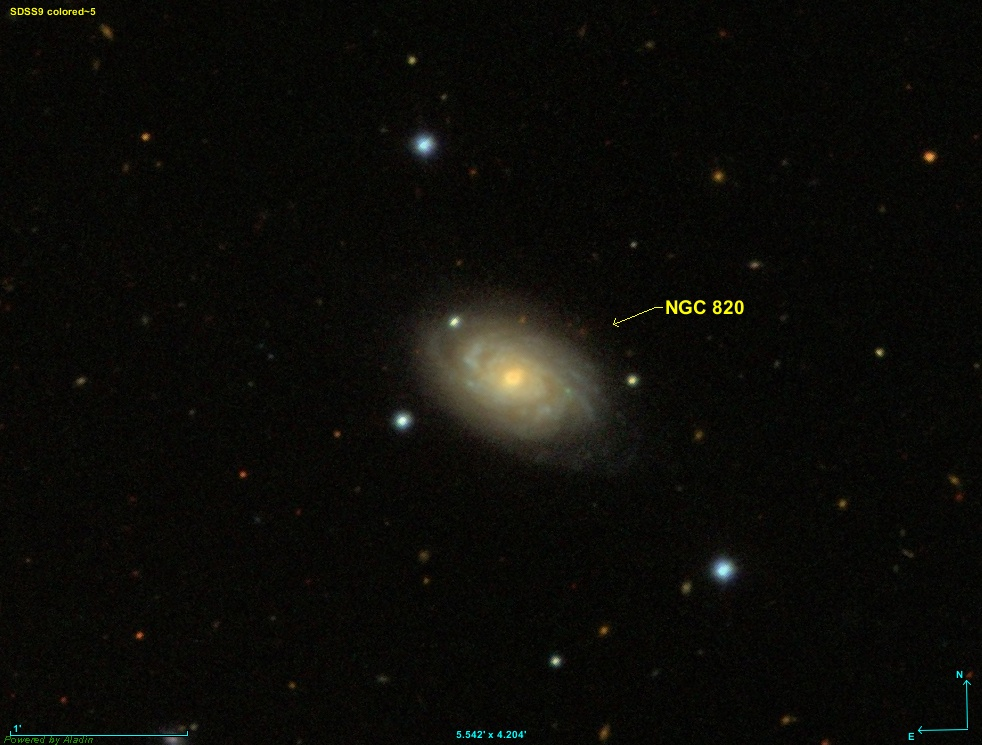
- SDSS image of NGC 820

Observation data (J2000 epoch)
- Constellation: Aries
- Right ascension: 02^{h} 08^{m} 24.97482^{s}
- Declination: +14° 20′ 58.5388″
- Redshift: 0.01477
- Heliocentric radial velocity: 4395 km/s
- Distance: 213.5 Mly (65.46 Mpc)
- Group or cluster: NGC 820 Group (LGG 48)
- Apparent magnitude (B): 13.7

Characteristics
- Type: Sb
- Size: ~82,900 ly (25.42 kpc) (estimated)

Other designations
- IRAS 02057+1406, UGC 1629, MCG +02-06-036, PGC 8165, CGCG 438-031

NGC 820 is a spiral galaxy located in the constellation Aries about 210 million light-years from the Milky Way. It was discovered by British astronomer John Herschel on 7 September 1828.

== NGC 820 Group ==
NGC 820 is the largest and brightest of a trio of galaxies. The other two galaxies in the NGC 820 group (also known as LGG 48) are UGC 1630 and UGC 1689.

== Supernova ==
One supernova has been observed in NGC 820: SN 2002ea (Type IIn, mag. 17.7) was discovered on 21 July 2002 by Tim Puckett and Jack Newton.

== See also ==
- List of NGC objects (1–1000)
