= NGC 6801 =

Galaxy in the constellation of Cygnus

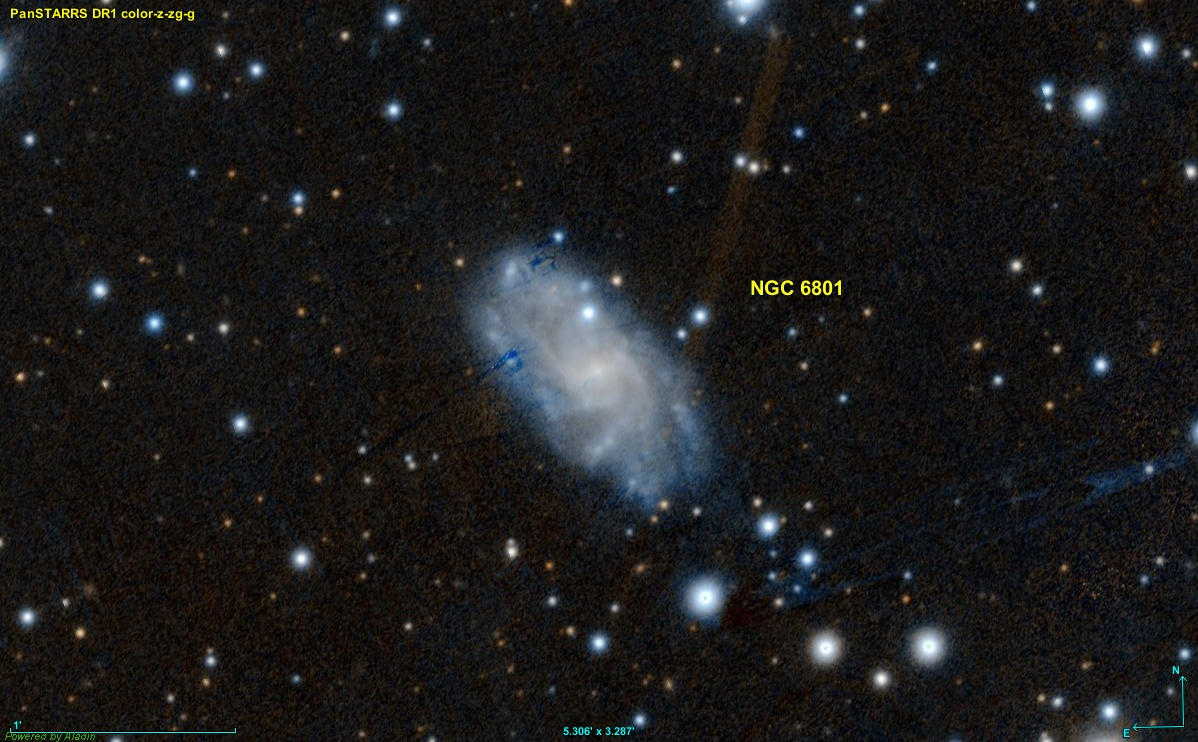
- PanSTARRS image of NGC 6801

Observation data (J2000 epoch)
- Constellation: Cygnus
- Right ascension: 19^{h} 27^{m} 35.8^{s}
- Declination: +54° 22′ 22″
- Redshift: 0.014393
- Heliocentric radial velocity: 4361 +/- 6 km/s
- Distance: 163.7 ± 22.5 Mly (50.2 ± 6.9 Mpc)
- Apparent magnitude (V): 14.62

Characteristics
- Type: SAcd
- Apparent size (V): 1.3' × 0.7'

Other designations
- UGC 11443, PGC 2394.

NGC 6801 is a spiral galaxy in the constellation of Cygnus. It was discovered by Lewis A. Swift on August 5, 1886.

== Supernovae ==
Two supernovae have been observed in NGC 6801:

- SN 2011df (Type Ia, mag. 17.6) was discovered by Tim Puckett and Jack Newton on 21 May 2011.
- SN 2015af (Type II, mag. 18.4) was discovered by Paolo Campaner as part of the Italian Supernovae Search Project (ISSP) on 9 August 2015.
