= NGC 1166 =

Barred spiral galaxy in the constellation Aries

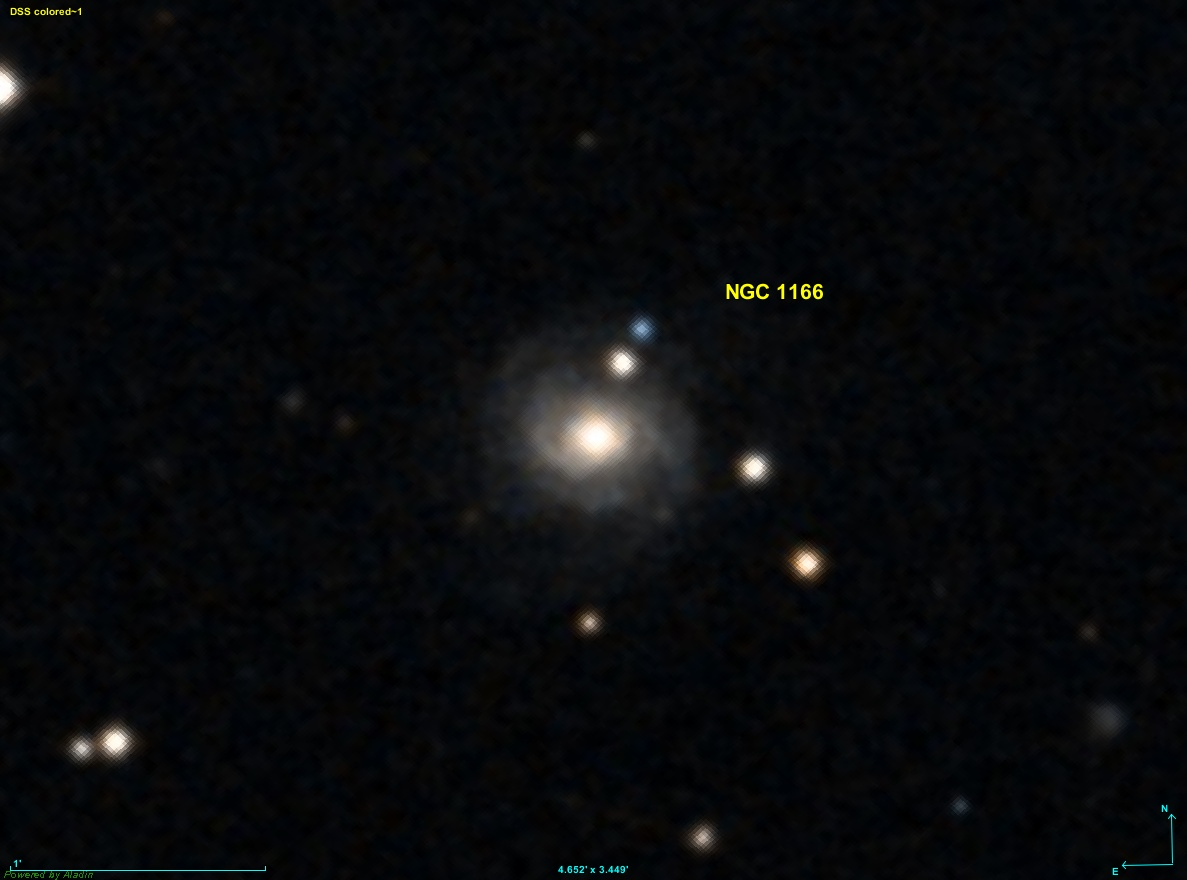
- NGC 1166 (Digitized Sky Survey)

Observation data (J2000.0 epoch)
- Constellation: Aries
- Right ascension: 03^{h} 00^{m} 34.98^{s}
- Declination: +11° 50′ 33.9″
- Redshift: 0.025965
- Heliocentric radial velocity: 7784±6 km/s
- Distance: 112 Mpc
- Apparent magnitude (V): ~14
- Apparent magnitude (B): 15.4

Characteristics
- Type: Sab
- Apparent size (V): 84.80"

Other designations
- PGC 11324, MCG -02-08-034, UGC 2437

NGC 1166 is a spiral galaxy located in the constellation Aries. It is situated approximately 112 million parsecs away from Earth and was discovered by the German astronomer Albert Marth on October 1, 1864.

== Supernovae ==
Two supernovae have been observed in NGC 1166:

- SN 2018htf (Type II, mag. 17.9) was discovered by the Puckett Observatory Supernovae Search (POSS) on 3 November 2018.
- SN 2021zby (Type IIb, mag. 18.162) was discovered by ATLAS on 17 September 2021.

== See also ==
- List of NGC objects
