= NGC 3197 =

Galaxy in the constellation Draco

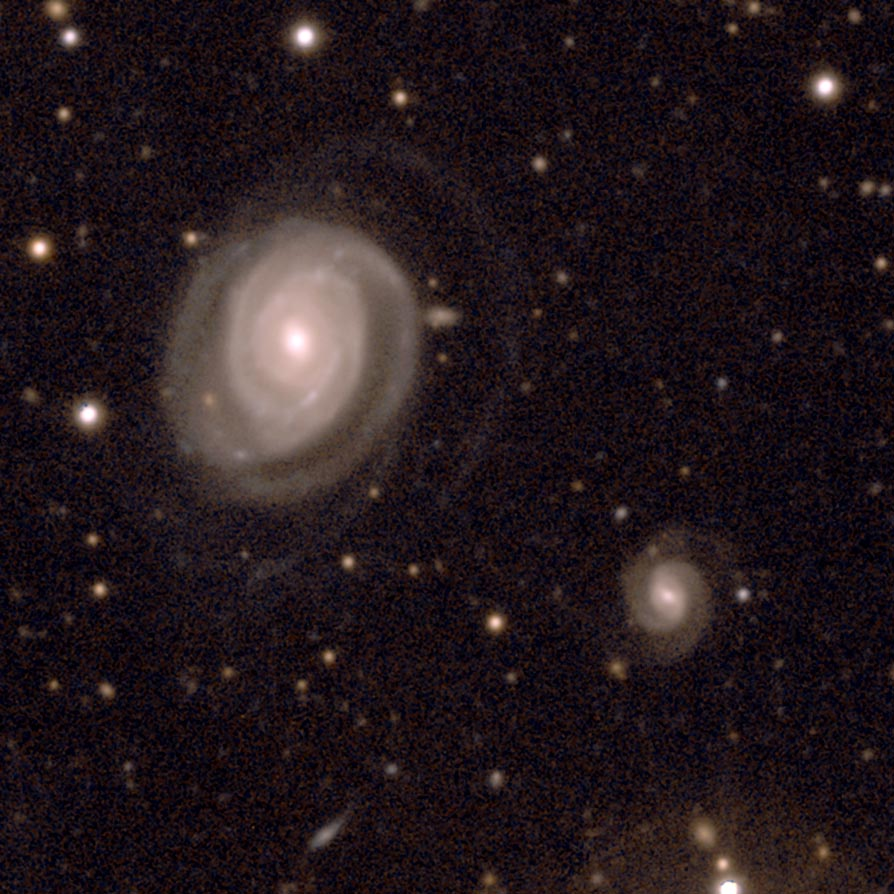
- NGC 3197 (left) with PGC 213677 (right) imaged by Legacy Surveys

Observation data (J2000 epoch)
- Constellation: Draco
- Right ascension: 10^{h} 14^{m} 27.7181^{s}
- Declination: +77° 49′ 13.427″
- Redshift: 0.027069±0.0000120
- Heliocentric radial velocity: 8,115±4 km/s
- Distance: 348.99 ± 4.98 Mly (107.000 ± 1.528 Mpc)
- Apparent magnitude (V): 14.34

Characteristics
- Type: Sbc
- Size: ~181,900 ly (55.77 kpc) (estimated)
- Apparent size (V): 1.3′ × 1.0′

Other designations
- 2MASX J10142763+7749129, UGC 5500, MCG +13-08-009, PGC 29870, CGCG 350-045

NGC 3197 is a spiral galaxy in the constellation of Draco. Its velocity with respect to the cosmic microwave background is 8,146±4 km/s, which corresponds to a Hubble distance of 391.9 ± 27.4 Mly (120.15 ± 8.41 Mpc). However, three non-redshift measurements give a closer mean distance of 348.99 ± 4.98 Mly (107.000 ± 1.528 Mpc). It was discovered by German-British astronomer William Herschel on 2 April 1801.

== Supernovae ==
Two supernovae have been observed in NGC 3197:

- SN 2005kx (Type II, mag. 17.3) was discovered by Tim Puckett and J. Tigner on 26 November 2005.
- SN 2022xqp (Type Ia, mag. 19.7221) was discovered by the Zwicky Transient Facility on 14 October 2022.

== See also ==
- List of NGC objects (3001–4000)
