= NGC 2357 =

Spiral galaxy in the constellation Gemini

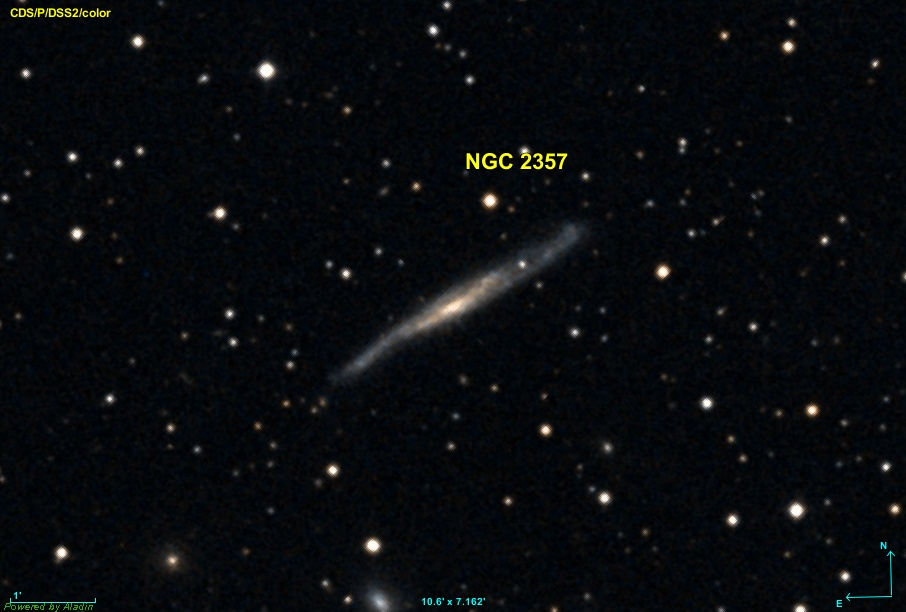
- NGC 2357 (DSS)

Observation data (J2000 epoch)
- Constellation: Gemini
- Right ascension: 07^{h} 17^{m} 41^{s}
- Declination: +23° 21′ 24″
- Redshift: 0.007589
- Distance: 106.6 ± 11 Mly (32.7 ± 3.4 Mpc)
- Apparent magnitude (V): 14.0

Characteristics
- Type: Scd
- Apparent size (V): 4.26' × 0.35'

Other designations
- UGC 3782, PGC 20592.

NGC 2357 is a spiral galaxy located in the constellation of Gemini. It was discovered by Édouard Stephan on 6 February 1885.

== Supernovae ==
Two supernovae have been observed in NGC 2357:

- SN 2010bj (Type II-P, mag. 16.1) was discovered by L. Cox and Tim Puckett on 27 March 2010.
- SN 2015I (Type Ia, mag. 15.7) was discovered by Toshihide Noguchi on 2 May 2015.

== See also ==
- List of NGC objects (2001-3000)
- List of NGC objects
