= NGC 5772 =

Galaxy in the constellation Boötes

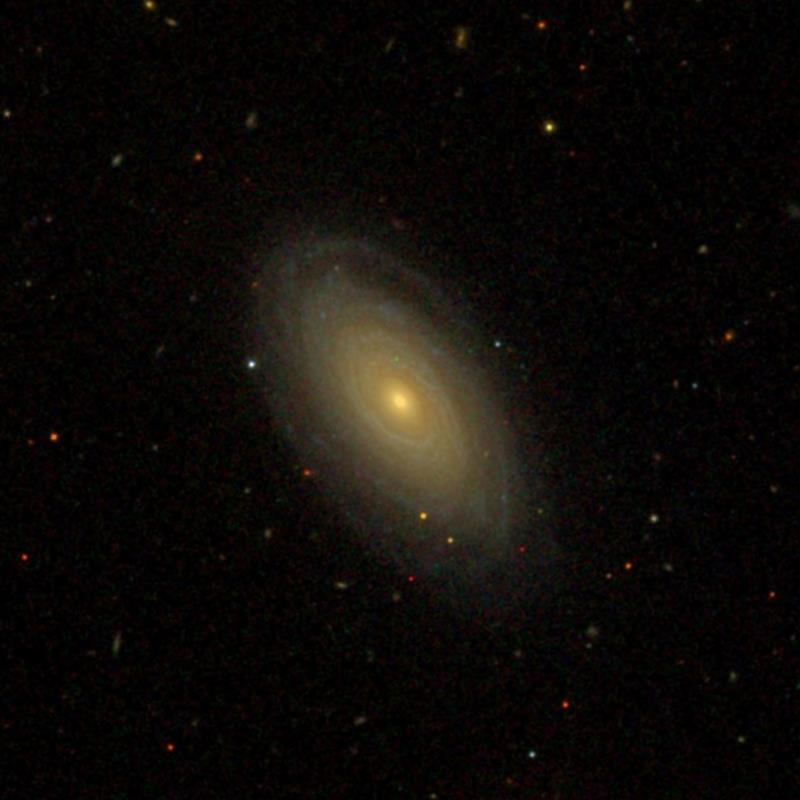
- NGC 5772 imaged by SDSS

Observation data (J2000 epoch)
- Constellation: Boötes
- Right ascension: 14^{h} 51^{m} 38.8908^{s}
- Declination: +40° 35′ 57.126″
- Redshift: 0.016245±0.00000667
- Heliocentric radial velocity: 4,870±2 km/s
- Distance: 232.35 ± 33.95 Mly (71.240 ± 10.409 Mpc)
- Apparent magnitude (V): 13.3g

Characteristics
- Type: SA(r)b
- Size: ~155,400 ly (47.66 kpc) (estimated)
- Apparent size (V): 1.91′ × 0.94′

Other designations
- IRAS 14497+4048, 2MASX J14513884+4035572, UGC 9566, MCG +07-31-001, PGC 53067, CGCG 220-060

NGC 5772 is a large spiral galaxy in the constellation of Boötes. Its velocity with respect to the cosmic microwave background is 5,001±9 km/s, which corresponds to a Hubble distance of 240.6 ± 16.9 Mly (73.77 ± 5.17 Mpc). Additionally, five non-redshift measurements give a slightly closer mean distance of 232.35 ± 33.95 Mly (71.240 ± 10.409 Mpc). It was discovered by British astronomer John Herschel on 12 May 1828.

NGC 5772 is a Seyfert galaxy, i.e. it has a quasar-like nucleus with very high surface brightnesses whose spectra reveal strong, high-ionisation emission lines, but unlike quasars, the host galaxy is clearly detectable. It is also a radio galaxy, i.e. it has giant regions of radio emission extending well beyond its visible structure.

== Supernovae ==
Two supernovae have been observed in NGC 5772:

- SN 2002ee (Type II-P, mag. 18.4) was discovered by Tim Puckett and D. Toth on 19 July 2002.
- SN 2015bb (Type Ic, mag. 17.0) was discovered by Kunihiro Shima on 16 November 2015.

== See also ==
- List of NGC objects (5001–6000)
