= NGC 5714 =

Galaxy in the constellation Boötes

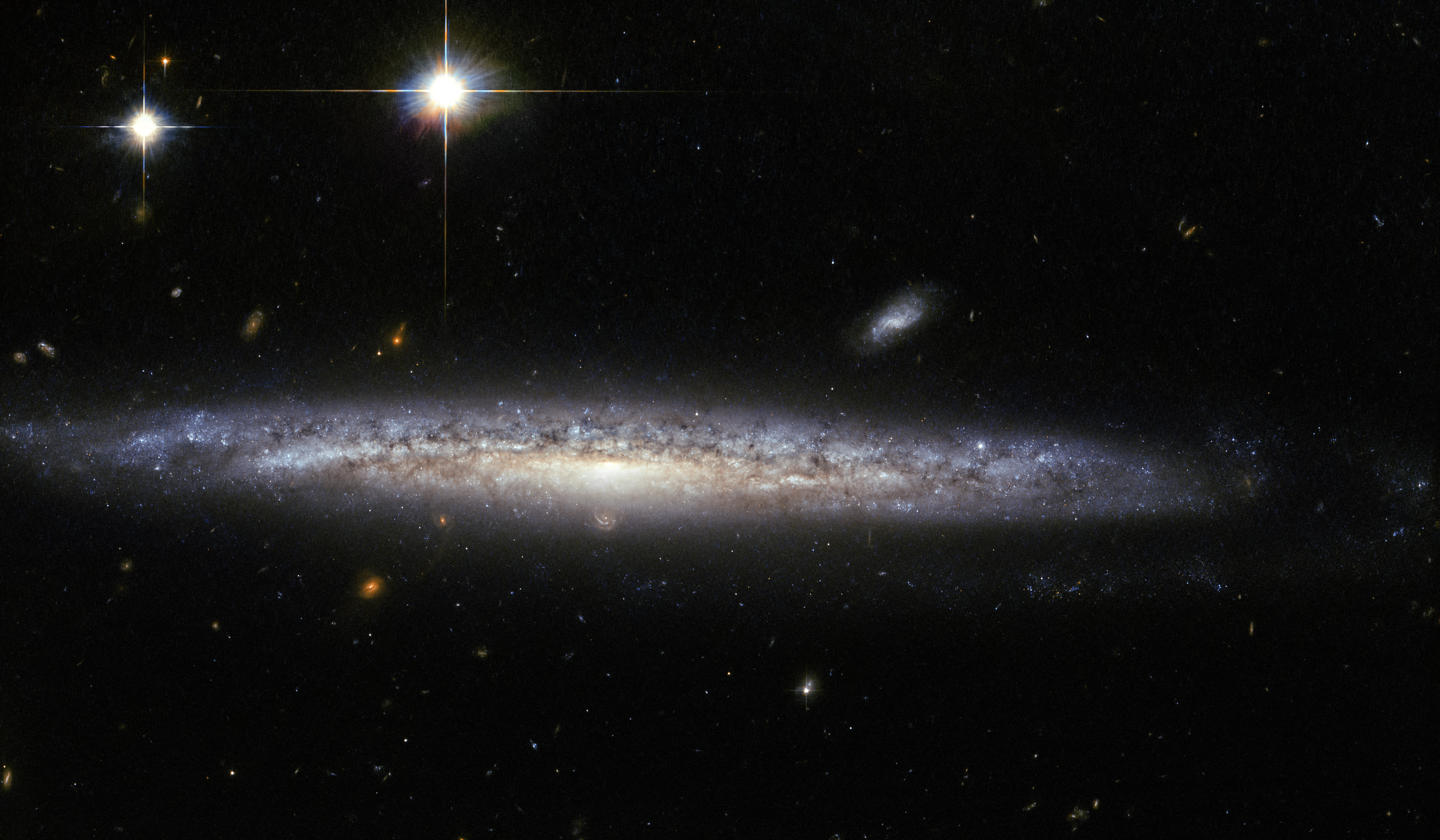
- NGC 5714 imaged by the Hubble Space Telescope

Observation data (J2000 epoch)
- Constellation: Boötes
- Right ascension: 14^{h} 38^{m} 11.543^{s}
- Declination: +46° 38′ 18.09″
- Redshift: 0.00746
- Heliocentric radial velocity: 2228 km/s
- Apparent magnitude (B): 14.2

Characteristics
- Type: Sc

Other designations
- FGC 1785, IRAS 14363+4651, IRAS F14363+4651, LEDA 52307, 2MASX J14381154+4638180, MCG+08-27-011, 2MFGC 11872, PSCz Q14363+4651, RFGC 2826, SDSS J143811.51+463817.6, TC 547, UGC 9431, UZC J143811.7+463817, Z 248-14, Z 1436.4+4651, [CHM2007] LDC 1062 J143811.54+4638180

NGC 5714 is a spiral galaxy located 130 million light-years away in the constellation of Boötes (the Herdsman). It was discovered by William Herschel in 1787. This galaxy is about 130 million light-years away.

== Supernova ==
One supernova has been observed in NGC 5714:

- SN 2003dr (Type Ib/c, mag. 17.9) was discovered by Tim Puckett and D. Toth, and independently by LOTOSS (Lick Observatory and Tenagra Observatory Supernova Searches), on 13 April 2003.
