= NGC 51 =

Galaxy in constellation Andromeda

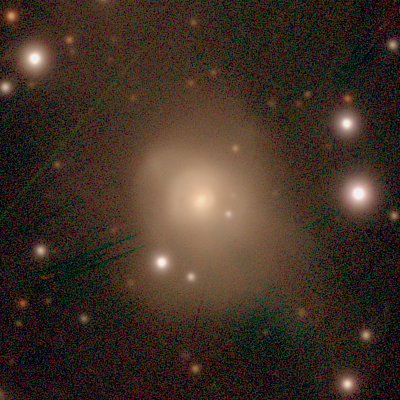
- NGC 51 with PanSTARRS

Observation data (2000.0 epoch)
- Constellation: Andromeda
- Right ascension: 00^{h} 14^{m} 34.895^{s}
- Declination: +48° 15′ 19.86″
- Redshift: 0.01862
- Heliocentric radial velocity: 5531 km/s
- Distance: 250 Mly (77 Mpc)
- Apparent magnitude (V): 13.1

Characteristics
- Type: S0/a
- Size: 90,000
- Apparent size (V): 1'.445 x 0'.891

Other designations
- 2MASX J00143489+4815198, UGC 138, MCG +08-01-035, PGC 974, CGCG 549-031

NGC 51 is a lenticular galaxy in the constellation Andromeda. It has a diameter of 90,000 light-years. The galaxy was discovered on September 7, 1885, by Lewis Swift, who described it as "Pretty faint, pretty small, round, brighter middle."

== Supernova ==
One supernova has been observed in NGC 51.

- SN 2016gxp (Type Ia, mag. 18.6), was discovered by POSS on October 5, 2016.

== See also ==
- List of NGC objects (1–1000)
