= NGC 5123 =

Galaxy in the constellation Canes Venatici

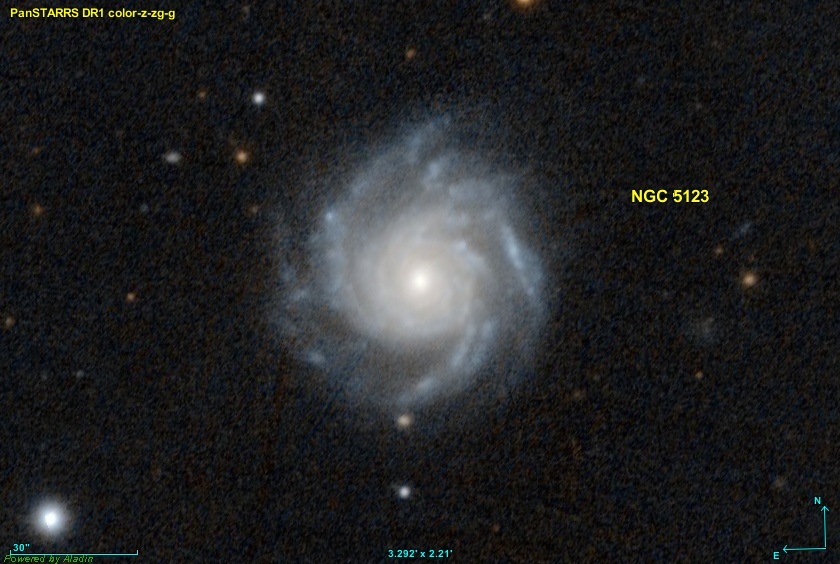
- NGC 5123 imaged by Pan-STARRS

Observation data (J2000 epoch)
- Constellation: Canes Venatici
- Right ascension: 13^{h} 23^{m} 10.5284^{s}
- Declination: +43° 05′ 10.750″
- Redshift: 0.027658±0.00000900
- Heliocentric radial velocity: 8,292±3 km/s
- Distance: 408.3 ± 28.6 Mly (125.18 ± 8.76 Mpc)
- Apparent magnitude (V): 13.6g

Characteristics
- Type: Scd
- Size: ~172,200 ly (52.81 kpc) (estimated)
- Apparent size (V): 1.20′ × 1.11′

Other designations
- IRAS 13209+4320, 2MASX J13231050+4305108, UGC 8415, MCG +07-28-005, PGC 46767, CGCG 218-006

NGC 5123 is a spiral galaxy in the constellation of Canes Venatici. Its velocity with respect to the cosmic microwave background is 8,487±14 km/s, which corresponds to a Hubble distance of 408.3 ± 28.6 Mly (125.18 ± 8.76 Mpc). It was discovered by German-British astronomer William Herschel on 9 April 1787.

NGC 5123 is a radio galaxy, i.e. it has giant regions of radio emission extending well beyond its visible structure.

== Supernova ==
One supernova has been observed in NGC 5123:

- SN 2008dz (Type II, mag. 17.4) was discovered by Tim Puckett and Robert Gagliano on 6 July 2008.

== See also ==
- List of NGC objects (5001–6000)
