= NGC 5698 =

Galaxy in the constellation Boötes

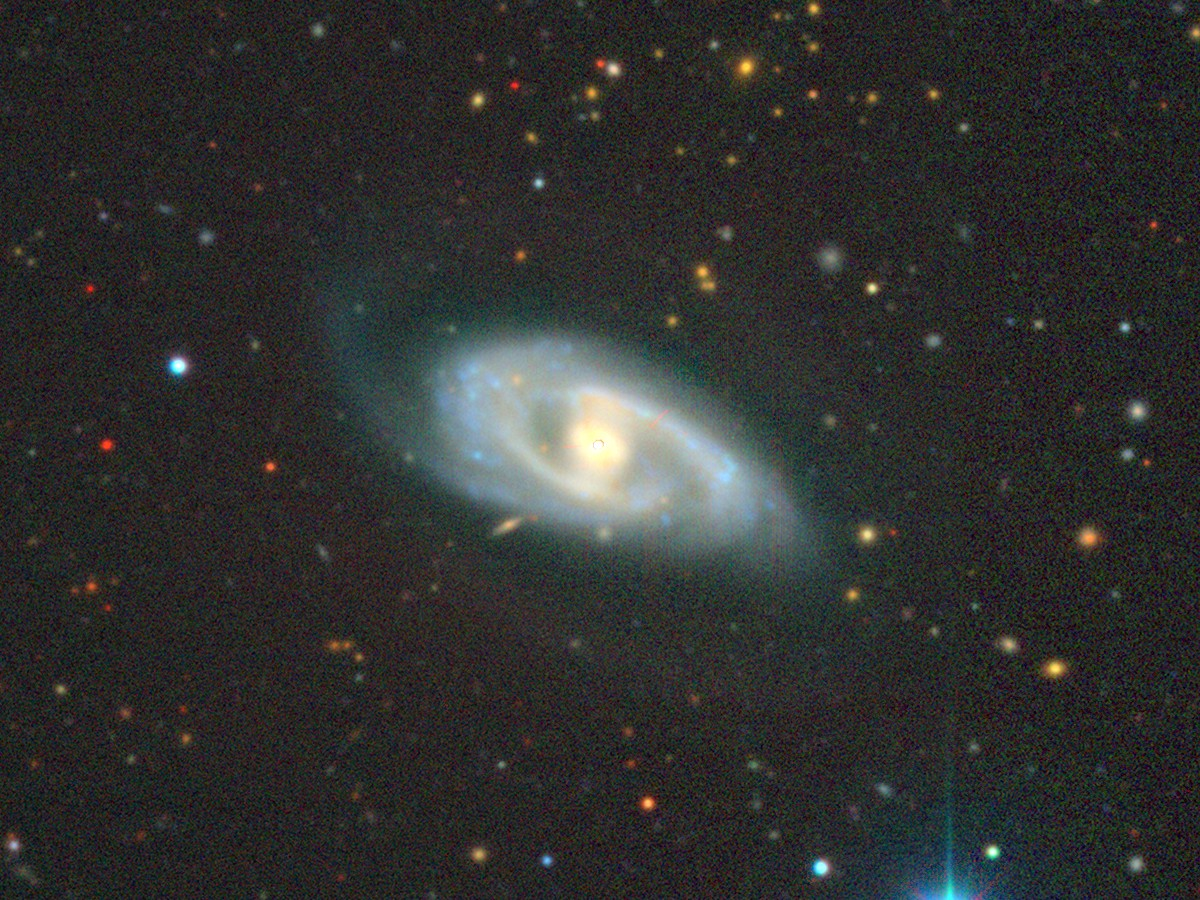
- NGC 5698 imaged by Legacy Surveys

Observation data (J2000 epoch)
- Constellation: Boötes
- Right ascension: 14^{h} 37^{m} 14.6972^{s}
- Declination: +38° 27′ 15.553″
- Redshift: 0.012106±0.00000911
- Heliocentric radial velocity: 3,629±3 km/s
- Distance: 154.23 ± 11.53 Mly (47.286 ± 3.535 Mpc)
- Apparent magnitude (V): 13.6g

Characteristics
- Type: SBb
- Size: ~93,900 ly (28.80 kpc) (estimated)
- Apparent size (V): 2.07′ × 0.78′

Other designations
- IRAS 14352+3840, 2MASX J14371464+3827150, UGC 9419, MCG +07-30-038, PGC 52251, CGCG 220-037

NGC 5698 is a barred spiral galaxy in the constellation of Boötes. Its velocity with respect to the cosmic microwave background is 3,782±11 km/s, which corresponds to a Hubble distance of 181.9 ± 12.8 Mly (55.78 ± 3.91 Mpc). However, 7 non-redshift measurements give a closer mean distance of 154.23 ± 11.53 Mly (47.286 ± 3.535 Mpc). It was discovered by German-British astronomer William Herschel on 16 May 1787.

NGC 5698 is a radio galaxy, i.e. it has giant regions of radio emission extending well beyond its visible structure. Additionally, NGC 5698 has a possible active galactic nucleus, i.e. it has a compact region at the center of a galaxy that emits a significant amount of energy across the electromagnetic spectrum, with characteristics indicating that this luminosity is not produced by the stars.

== Supernova ==
One supernova has been observed in NGC 5698:

- SN 2005bc (Type Ia, mag. 16.6) was discovered by the Lick Observatory Supernova Search (LOSS), and independently by Tim Puckett and L. Cox, on 2 April 2005.

== See also ==
- List of NGC objects (5001–6000)
