= NGC 6324 =

Galaxy in the constellation Ursa Minor

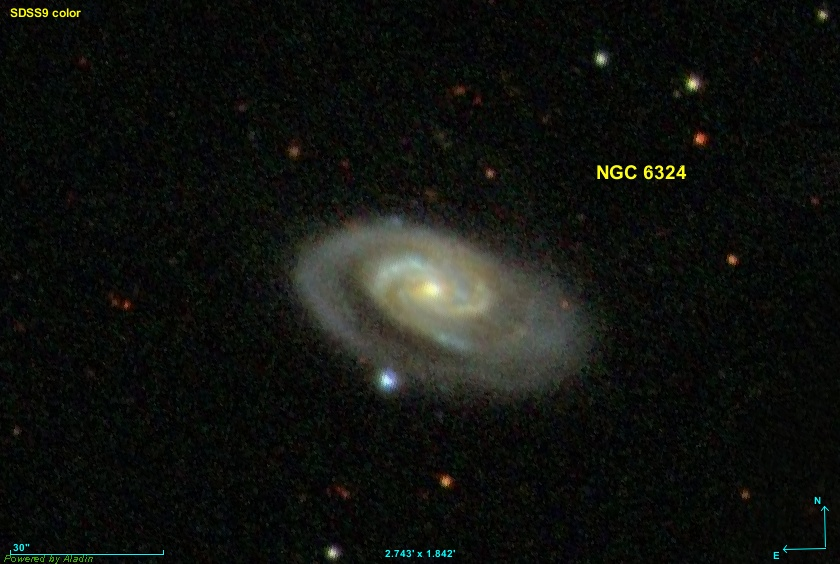
- NGC 6324 imaged by SDSS

Observation data (J2000 epoch)
- Constellation: Ursa Minor
- Right ascension: 17^{h} 05^{m} 25.4687^{s}
- Declination: +75° 24′ 26.061″
- Redshift: 0.016231±0.000127
- Heliocentric radial velocity: 4,866±38 km/s
- Distance: 232.1 ± 16.4 Mly (71.16 ± 5.04 Mpc)
- Apparent magnitude (V): 13.8

Characteristics
- Type: Sc
- Size: ~81,500 ly (25.00 kpc) (estimated)
- Apparent size (V): 0.9′ × 0.5′

Other designations
- IRAS 17070+7528, 2MASX J17052594+7524267, UGC 10725, MCG +13-12-016, PGC 59583, CGCG 355-025

NGC 6324 is a spiral galaxy in the constellation of Ursa Minor. Its velocity with respect to the cosmic microwave background is 4,825±38 km/s, which corresponds to a Hubble distance of 232.1 ± 16.4 Mly (71.16 ± 5.04 Mpc). It was discovered by German-British astronomer William Herschel on 12 December 1797.

NGC 6324 has a possible active galactic nucleus, i.e. it has a compact region at the center of a galaxy that emits a significant amount of energy across the electromagnetic spectrum, with characteristics indicating that this luminosity is not produced by the stars.

== Supernovae ==
Two supernovae have been observed in NGC 6324:

- SN 2002ej (Type II, mag. 17.5) was discovered by Tim Puckett and Brian Kerns on 9 August 2002.
- SN 2026aur (Type Ib, mag. 19.2987) was discovered by the Zwicky Transient Facility on 9 January 2026.

== See also ==
- List of NGC objects (6001–7000)
