= UGC 934 =

Galaxy in the constellation Pisces

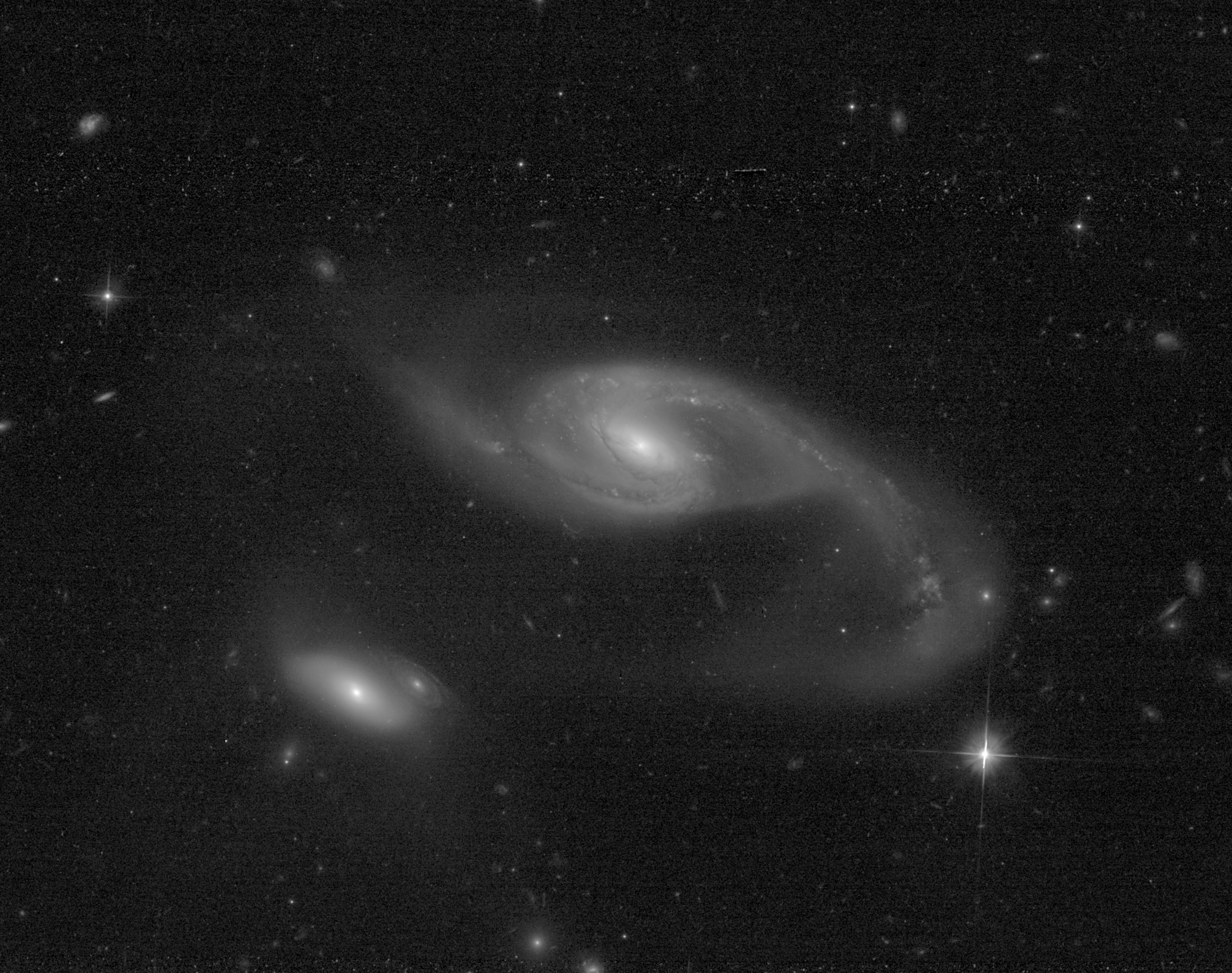
- Hubble image of UGC 934.

Observation data (J2000 epoch)
- Constellation: Pisces
- Right ascension: 01^{h} 23^{m} 28.3^{s}
- Declination: +30° 47′ 04.1″
- Redshift: 0.034927
- Heliocentric radial velocity: 10,471 km/s
- Distance: 469 Mly (143.8 Mpc)
- Group or cluster: Abell 1960
- Apparent magnitude (V): 0.14
- Apparent magnitude (B): 0.19

Characteristics
- Type: S?
- Size: 285,000 ly
- Apparent size (V): 1.7' × 0.6'

Other designations
- LEDA 5085, VV 341a, MCG +05-04-042, NSA 129346, 2MASX J012328.30+304703.9

UGC 934, known as PGC 5085, is a large spiral galaxy about 470 million light-years away from the Solar System. It is located in the constellation of Pisces and about 285,000 thousand light-years in diameter.

With its neighboring galaxy PGC 212740, they together form the galaxy pair, VV 341. They are also known as Arp 70, the 70th number in the Atlas of Peculiar Galaxies, created by Halton Arp. In this class, they fall under spiral galaxies that have a small high-surface brightness companions.

According to Laurikainen, Salo & Aparicio, UGC 934 and the neighboring galaxy are examples of M51- type galaxies, i.e. a system where a large galaxy with two spiral arms is seen interacting with a smaller companion. It is likely the interaction with PGC 212740 would result UGC 934 having grand design spiral arms.

The SIMBAD database and by Lacerda et al. (2020) classifies UGC 934 as a Seyfert type 2 galaxy with an active galactic nucleus.

A giant H II region in the galaxy has been discovered in one of its spiral arms. It has a luminosity of (7.5 ± 0.5) × 10^{40} ergs^{−1}. Additionally, the rate of star formation in UGC 934 is 0.59 ± 0.04 M_{⊙} yr^{−1}.

== Supernovae ==
Two supernovae have been discovered in UGC 934 so far, SN 2003lc and SN 2005ly.

=== SN 2003lc ===
SN 2003lc, was an apparent supernova located 32.1" west and 10.7" north of its nucleus. It was discovered by two astronomers, T. Puckett and L. Cox in December 2003, via an unfiltered CCD frame but no supernova classification was confirmed.

=== SN 2005ly ===
SN 2005ly was discovered by T. Puckett and G. Sostero in December 2005, using another unfiltered CCD frame observed with the Puckett Observatory supernova patrol telescope in Ellijay, Georgia. It was located 5".4 east and 18".2 south. Unlike SN 2003lc, SN 2005ly was classified a Type-IIn supernova by astronomers from Harvard-Smithsonian Center for Astrophysics and the National Optical Astronomy Observatory who obtained its spectrum. They confirmed it has Balmer emission lines, having both a narrow and wide component, and a blue continuum indicating a relative young age for the spectrum.
