= NGC 7503 =

Galaxy in the constellation of Pisces

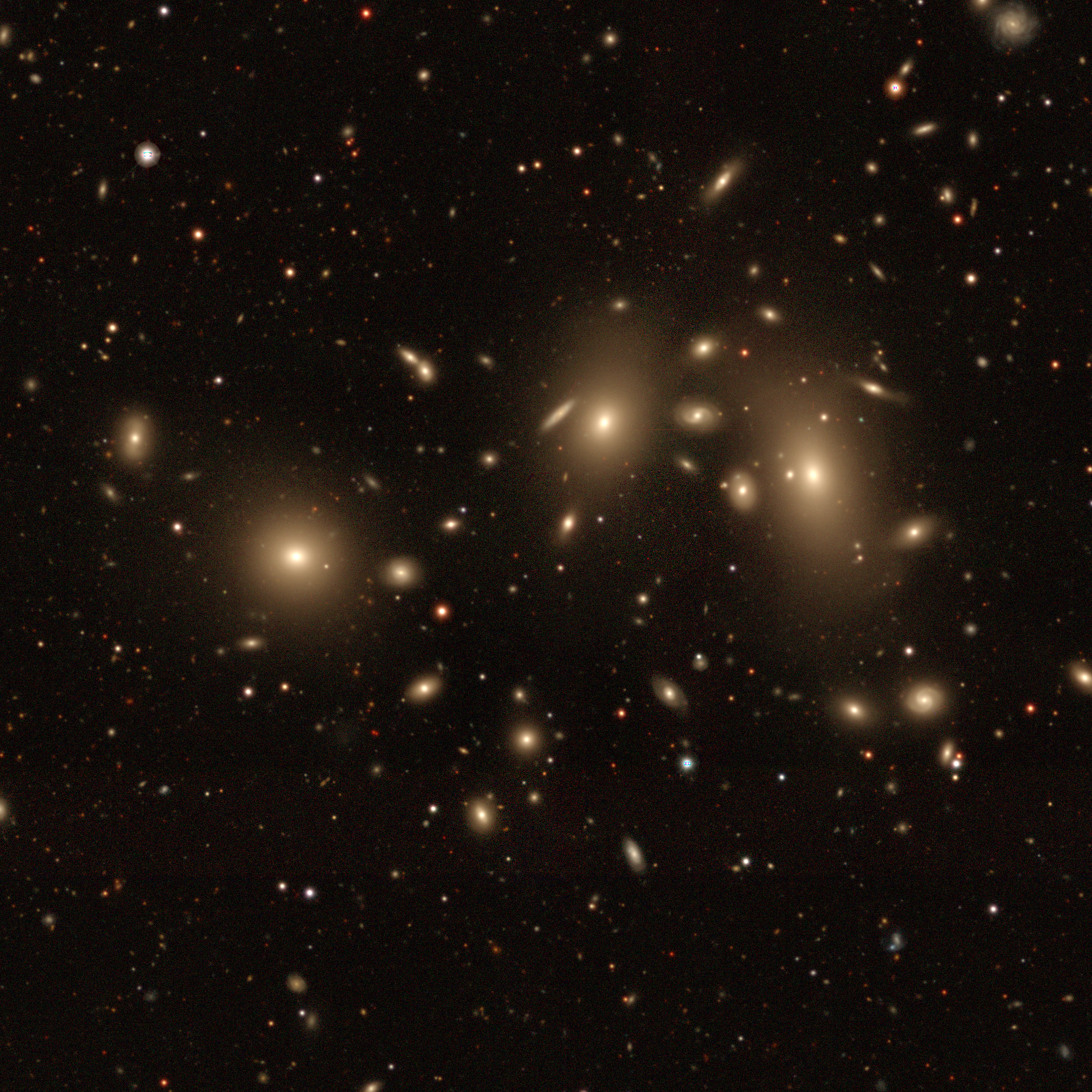
- From right to left: NGC 7499, NGC 7501 and NGC 7503

Observation data (J2000 epoch)
- Constellation: Pisces
- Right ascension: 23^{h} 10^{m} 42.279^{s}
- Declination: +07° 34′ 03.66″
- Redshift: 0.04407
- Heliocentric radial velocity: 12920 km/s
- Distance: 521.72 ± 0.29 Mly (159.96 ± 0.09 Mpc)
- Apparent magnitude (V): 13.06
- Absolute magnitude (V): −22.7

Characteristics
- Type: E2:

Other designations
- MCG +01-59-008, PGC 70628, 4C 07.61

NGC 7503 is an elliptical galaxy in the constellation Pisces. It was discovered by the astronomer Albert Marth on September 2, 1864. It is the brightest galaxy in its cluster (a BCG).

In 2001, SN 2001ic, a type Ia supernova, was detected within NGC 7503.
