= NGC 7501 =

Galaxy in the constellation of Pisces

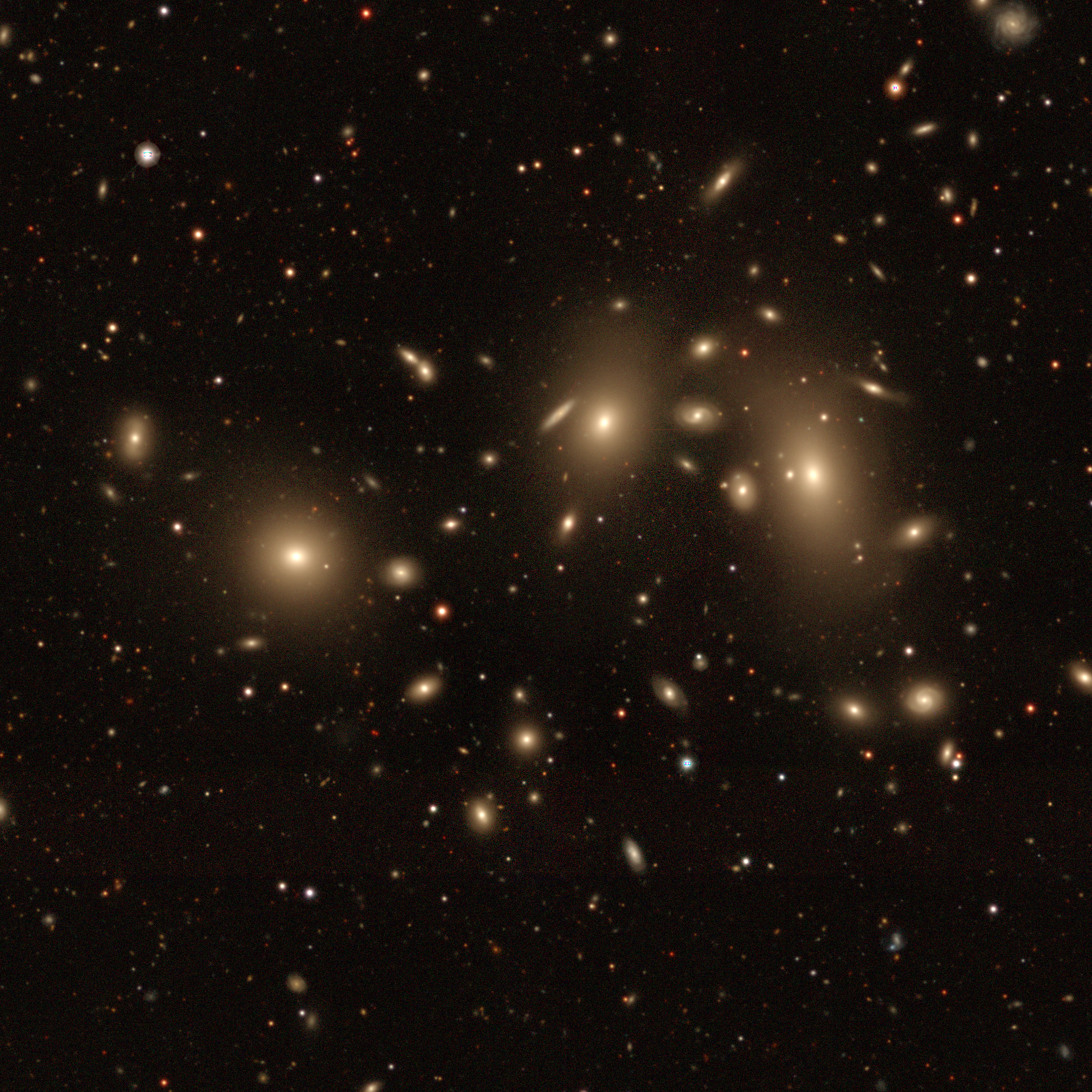
- from right to left: NGC 7499, NGC 7501 and NGC 7503

Observation data (J2000 epoch)
- Constellation: Pisces
- Right ascension: 23^{h} 10^{m} 30.424^{s}
- Declination: +07° 35′ 20.53″
- Redshift: 0.04266
- Heliocentric radial velocity: 12790 km/s
- Distance: 597.4 ± 41.9 Mly (183.17 ± 12.84 Mpc)
- Group or cluster: Pegasus II cluster
- Apparent magnitude (V): 13.31
- Absolute magnitude (V): −23.1

Characteristics
- Type: E1?
- Size: ~229,600 ly (70.40 kpc) (estimated)

Other designations
- WISEA J231030.40+073520.5, MCG +01-59-007, PGC 70619, CGCG 406-008

NGC 7501 is an elliptical galaxy located in the constellation Pisces. It was discovered on September 2, 1864 by the astronomer Albert Marth. It is a member of the Pegasus II cluster of galaxies. A radio source has been detected within one minute of arc of the position of NGC 7501.

== Supernova ==
One supernova has been observed in NGC 7501: SN 2021wyw (type Ia, mag. 19.5).

== See also ==
- List of NGC objects (7001–7840)
- List of NGC objects
