= NGC 7311 =

Spiral galaxy

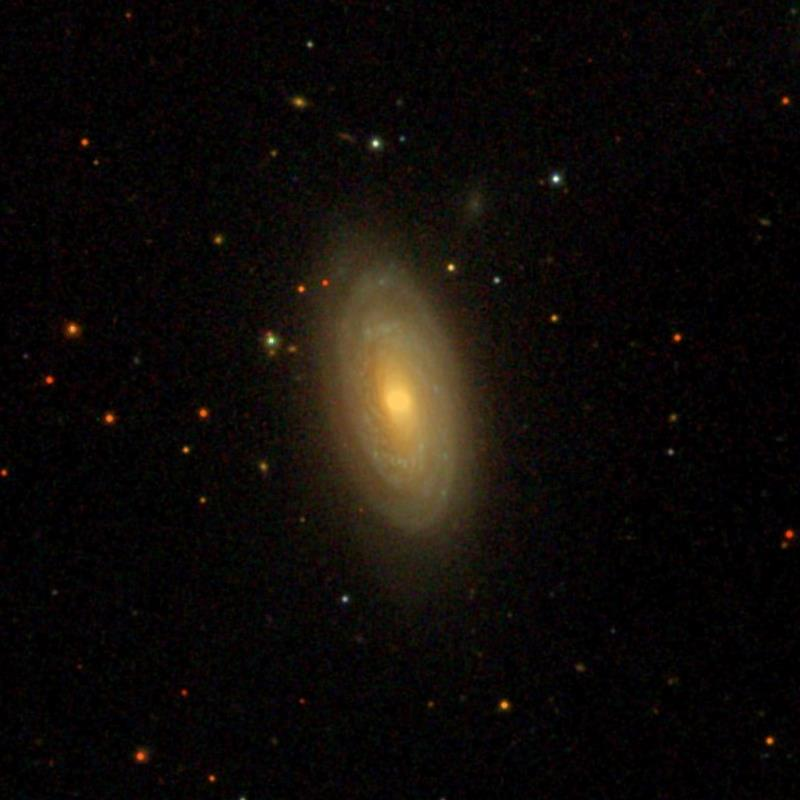
- NGC 7311 imaged by the Sloan Digital Sky Survey

Observation data
- Constellation: Pegasus
- Right ascension: 22^{h} 35^{m} 25^{s}
- Declination: +05° 42′ 18″

Other designations
- UGC 12080, PGC 69172

NGC 7311 is a spiral galaxy located in the constellation Pegasus. It was discovered on August 30, 1785 by the astronomer William Herschel.It is 190 million light years distant.

== Supernovae ==
Two supernovae have been observed in NGC 7311:

- SN 2005kc (Type Ia, mag. 18.2) was discovered by Tim Puckett and G. Sostero on 9 November 2005.
- SN 2019dts (Type II, mag. 19.53) was discovered by Gaia Photometric Science Alerts on 20 April 2019.
