= SN 2005bc =

Supernova in the constellation Boötes

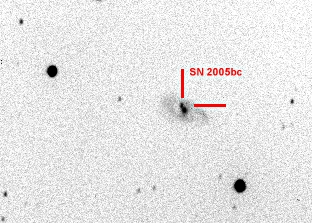
- SN 2005bc just over a week after peak brightness
- Event type: Supernova
- Type Ia
- Date: c. 129.3 million years ago (detected 2 April 2005 by Tim Puckett and L. Cox)
- Constellation: Boötes
- Right ascension: 14^{h} 37^{m} 14.78^{s}
- Declination: +38° 27′ 23.1″
- Epoch: J2000.0
- Galactic coordinates: Long 66.76° Lat 65.17°
- Distance: 129.3 Mly (39.63 Mpc)
- Redshift: 0.0132, 0.0122
- Host: NGC 5698
- Progenitor type: white dwarf
- Peak apparent magnitude: +16.6
- Other designations: SN 2005bc

SN 2005bc was a Type Ia supernova occurring in the barred spiral galaxy NGC 5698, located in the northern constellation of Boötes. SN 2005bc was discovered on 2 April 2005 by LOSS and independently by Tim Puckett and L. Cox. It was positioned at an offset of 4.6″ east and 7.5″ north of the galactic nucleus. The supernova was at magnitude 16.4 at discovery, and quickly rose to a peak magnitude of around 15.3 (in visible light) just over a week after discovery. It showed an expansion velocity of 12,000 km/s. By mid-May, the supernova had faded to 17th magnitude.

The host galaxy, NGC 5698, along with the supernova lie approximately 129 million light-years (~40 million parsecs) from Earth. As the supernova was of Type Ia, its progenitor star was a compact white dwarf star that exceeded the Chandrasekhar limit.
