= Jack B. Newton =

Canadian amateur astronomer (1942–2025)

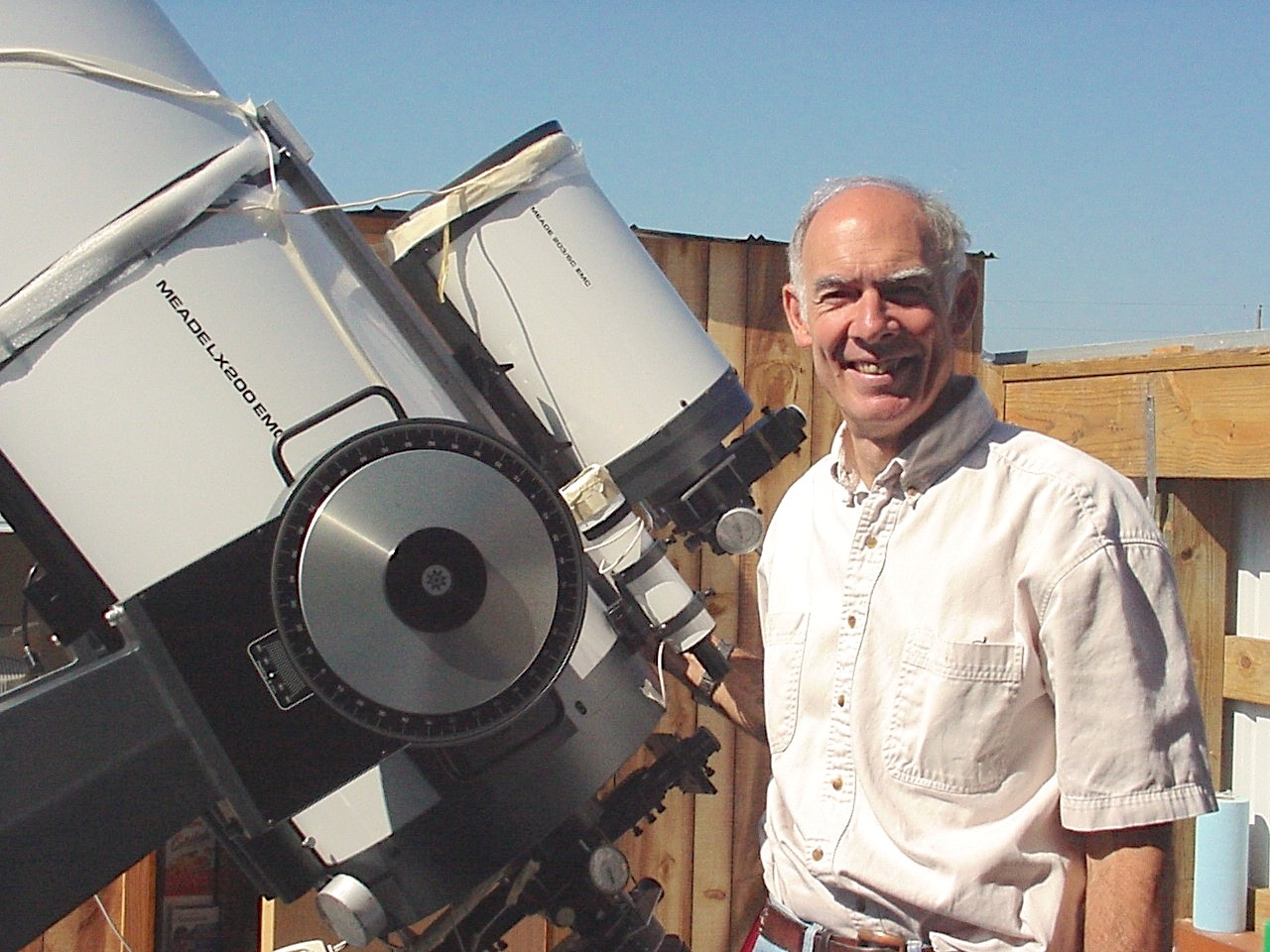
- Newton in Florida, 1999 (age 57) with his Meade 16 in (41 cm) and 8 in (20 cm) telescopes
- Born: August 13, 1942; Winnipeg, Manitoba, Canada
- Died: November 11, 2025 (aged 83); Oliver, British Columbia, Canada
- Education: Red River College Polytechnic
- Known for: Cold camera astrophotography; full-color charge-coupled device images of nebulae; hydrogen-alpha photography of solar prominences; name of asteroid, 30840 Jackalice; member of the Puckett Observatory World Supernova Search Team credited with 376 supernova discoveries
- Spouse: Alice Newton
- Awards: 1977 Queen Elizabeth II Silver Jubilee Medal; 1978 Ken Chilton Prize of the Royal Astronomical Society of Canada (RASC); 1989 Chant Medal Award of RASC; 1988 Amateur Achievement Award of Astronomical Society of the Pacific
- Scientific career
- Fields: Astronomy

John Borden "Jack" Newton (13 August 1942 – 11 November 2025) was a Canadian astronomer, known for his publications and images in amateur astrophotography, and for his outreach to educate the public about astronomy.

Newton is credited with the invention of "cold camera" astrophotography, which enabled enhanced images of galaxies, the Sun, and other astronomical objects taken from a ground-based, amateur-level telescope.

His expert astrophotographs were exhibited by publication of six books and articles in astronomy, scientific, and popular magazines, and in public presentations. For his contributions to science and astronomy education over decades, Newton received national and regional astronomy awards in Canada, the United States, and England.

With his wife, Alice, Jack Newton was devoted to preserving dark skies to reveal unique celestial objects to the public.

== Background ==
Jack Newton was born in Winnipeg on 13 August 1942. He obtained a diploma in business administration from Red River College Polytechnic, eventually becoming a store manager for Sears Canada and Marks & Spencer in Winnipeg.

He became interested in astronomy at age 12, later joining the Winnipeg Centre of the Royal Astronomical Society of Canada (RASC) and its Moonwatch program. In 1969, he built a 32 cm (13 in) telescope and observatory dome in his backyard, while participating in astrophotography studies at the Winnipeg Centre of RASC where he became president from 1970-72.

His work in store management required a move to Toronto in 1973, when he began testing film types for astrophotography, including experiments with cooled emulsions and hypersensitized, gas-soaked films. This work led to publication of his first book in 1974, Astro Photography: From Film to Infinity. In 1975, he became president of the Toronto Centre of RASC for 1975-76, while maintaining his research and development of astrophotography, enabling publication in 1997 of An Introduction to CCD Astronomy and Deep Sky Objects: A Photographic Guide for the Amateur.

In 1979, Newton moved for work to Victoria, British Columbia where he joined the Victoria Centre of RASC, serving as president in 1980-81 and 1990-91. Throughout his RASC participation and in later life, he was widely regarded as a public speaker, author, and educator for astronomy and astrophotography.

From July 2000 to October 2023, Newton and his wife, Alice, provided an astronomy-themed bed and breakfast service in their home in Osoyoos, British Columbia where guests were given night and morning celestial tours – in the observatory built by Newton – using an automated 16 in (41 cm) Meade LX200 telescope under Jack's instruction.

Jack and Alice Newton are cofounders of the Arizona Sky Village, a dark-sky preserve and astronomy-oriented community in Portal, Arizona.

Jack Newton died in Oliver, British Columbia on 11 November 2025 at age 83.

== Astrophotography ==
Newton was 13 years old when he took his first astrophotograph of the planet Saturn. He pioneered "cold camera" astrophotography, chilling a film camera with dry ice, allowing for substantially longer exposures on film to enhance the details of dim, distant celestial objects. Many of his astrophotographs were published in mainstream magazines, such as the National Newsletter, Astronomy Magazine, Sky & Telescope, Newsweek, and Canadian Geographic.

In 1991, Newton became the first amateur astrophotographer to make full-color charge-coupled device (CCD) images of celestial objects using a Santa Barbara Instruments Group ST-4 camera, constructing a full-color CCD image of Messier 57, the "Ring Nebula" and Messier 27, the "Dumbbell Nebula". Newton used three separate black and white images, each with a separate filter in red, blue, and green, to construct full-color images with software being developed by Richard Berry, then editor of Astronomy Magazine. This first CCD image of the Dumbbell Nebula was published on the cover of Astronomy Magazine in February, 1992.

In 1992, Newton used his self-built 25 in (64 cm) Newtonian telescope and ST-6 CCD camera to take multiple exposures of Comet Swift–Tuttle from his home in Sooke, British Columbia, sharing the images with members of the University of Victoria Department of Physics and Astronomy for digital image processing and astrometry. In another innovation, Newton captured images of hydrogen-alpha bursts of plasma ejections from the Sun's surface using a specialized telescope filter, a facility he provided for guests to observe at the Osoyoos Observatory B&B.

Newton was a member of the Harvard University team allocated time on the Hubble Space Telescope in 2010 – and the first Canadian to use Hubble – for study of the Type Ib supernova named SN 2010O, discovered in the colliding double-galaxy NGC 3690/Arp 299.

== Publications ==
=== Books ===
Newton published books on amateur astronomy and astrophotography.

- His first, Astrophotography: From Film to Infinity, was published by the Astronomical Endeavors Publishing Company (Buffalo, NY) in 1974 (specific ISBN unavailable).
- Deep Sky Objects: A Photographic Guide for the Amateur was published in 1977 by Gall Publications (Toronto) ISBN 0889040818.
- An Introduction to CCD Astronomy and Deep Sky Objects: A Photographic Guide for the Amateur was published with Philip Teece as coauthor in 1977 ISBN 9780521573078.
- In 1979 with Philip Teece, he published The Guide to Amateur Astronomy (1995, 2nd edition) ISBN 9780521444927.
- Via Cambridge University Press and with Philip Teece as coauthor, Newton published the Cambridge Deep-Sky Album in 1984 ISBN 0521256682.
- Splendors of the Universe: A Practical Guide to Photographing the Night Sky was published with Terence Dickinson as coauthor in 1997 (Firefly Press, ISBN 9781552091418).

=== Astrophotography letters ===
Published in the journal of the Royal Astronomical Society of Canada, Newton wrote short papers and letters as brief guides for amateur astronomers.

- The construction of a hydrogen-alpha solar prominence spectroscope, 1970.
- General Index to the Journal 1967-1996, Royal Astronomical Society of Canada - search: "Jack Newton"

== Awards and recognition ==
- 1977: Received the Queen Elizabeth II Silver Jubilee Medal for his contributions to science.
- 1978: Elected as a Life Member of the Royal Astronomical Society of Canada (RASC). His photos appeared on the cover of the 2007 Observer’s Handbook and in the 2007 RASC calendar. The Victoria RASC Centre created a "Newton/Ball" (Jack Newton/George Ball) Award given annually as a service award.
- 1978: Received the RASC Ken Chilton Prize.
- 1988: Amateur Achievement Award of the Astronomical Society of the Pacific for his work in astrophotography. This award "recognizes significant observational or technological contributions to astronomy or amateur astronomy by an individual not employed in the field of astronomy in a professional capacity".
- 1989: Received the Chant Medal Award of RASC to acknowledge his amateur work for developing the cold camera to improve film sensitivity in astrophotography.
- 1991: Elected by membership of the Astronomical Society of the Pacific to three terms of office on its Board of Directors (1991–97, 2006–07). He led the launch of Project Astro to aid academic astronomers and school teachers.
- 1994-2018: Newton was a long-time member of the Puckett Observatory World Supernova Search Team, which was credited with one pre-discovery, 376 supernova discoveries and co-discoveries over their search history of 1994-2018, and one discovery of a cataclysmic variable star in June 2010. Named as co-discoverer of three supernovae in 2015 by the Central Bureau for Astronomical Telegrams.
- 2005: Carolyn S. Shoemaker and David H. Levy named an asteroid, 30840 Jackalice = 1991 GC2, in honor of Newton's astrophotographic accomplishments and for work in astronomy outreach by Jack and Alice Newton. The asteroid was last observed on 9 June 2025.
- 2006: Honorary membership in the Astronomical League, an American association of 330 amateur astronomy societies.
- 2017: Recognized with Alice Newton as an Honorary Patron of the Cotswold Astronomical Society.
- Newton helped establish the astronomy program at the Lester B. Pearson College of the Pacific, Metchosin, British Columbia, in collaboration with retired faculty member and physics professor, Jean Godin; Newton donated to the institution's Newton-Godin Observatory a 25 in (64 cm) Newtonian telescope – which Newton had assembled himself – regarded for years as one of the largest private telescopes in Canada. Jack and Alice Newton served several terms as honorary patrons of the college.

Jack made solar eclipse expeditions to Oaxaca (Mexico), Baker Lake, Nunavut, Brańsk, Poland, Baja California, and Indonesia. In 1986, he led a group of 300 amateur astronomers to Peru to view Halley's Comet.

== Documentary ==
A 2023 documentary entitled, "Jack Newton's Journey to the Stars", including interviews with him, covered the history of his telescope and camera innovations.

== Public outreach ==
The devotion of Jack and his wife, Alice, by promoting astronomy education with night and day telescope sessions for guests at the Osoyoos Observatory B&B was recognized over 23 years by new and repeat visitors.

Newton's photography and writing were published in numerous issues of Astronomy magazine, in Skynews (Canada), and in Sterne und Weltraum – the journal of the German Max Planck Institute. In July 2003 and February 2009 issues, Astronomy published several of Newton's remarkable astrophotographs, calling the selections, "A mix of solar and deep-sky images taken by a master".

In 2007, one of his solar images was used for the lead-in to the science section in Life: Platinum Edition Anniversary Collection—70 Years of Extraordinary Photography (ISBN 1-933405-17-1).

His solar images appeared in National Geographic's 2004 special edition entitled Exploring Space - The Universe in Pictures, Time Inc.'s Life - the Year in Pictures (2003 and 2004), and in Sky & Telescope's 2004 Beautiful Universe issue. His astrophotographs have appeared in the Audubon Field Guide to the Night Sky, and in Nightwatch, an astronomy book by Terence Dickinson, with whom Newton co-wrote Splendors of the Universe: A Practical Guide to Photographing the Night Sky, 1997.

=== Dark sky commitment ===
Newton was active in supporting the goals of the international dark-sky movement, having such enthusiasm that he bought over 400 acres (160 ha) of remote desert land in Arizona in 2002 to create the Arizona Sky Village – a community devoted to amateur astronomy through use of personal telescopes in their own home observatories.

Maintaining a dark-sky preserve by omission of street lights, the village is one of the darkest night sky locations in the United States, having about 300 clear-sky nights per year for celestial exploration, and a single nighttime rule: turn off all lights.

Preceded by Clinton B. Ford	Amateur Achievement Award of Astronomical Society of the Pacific; 1988	Succeeded by Paul Baize
