= NGC 6051 =

Galaxy in the constellation of Serpens

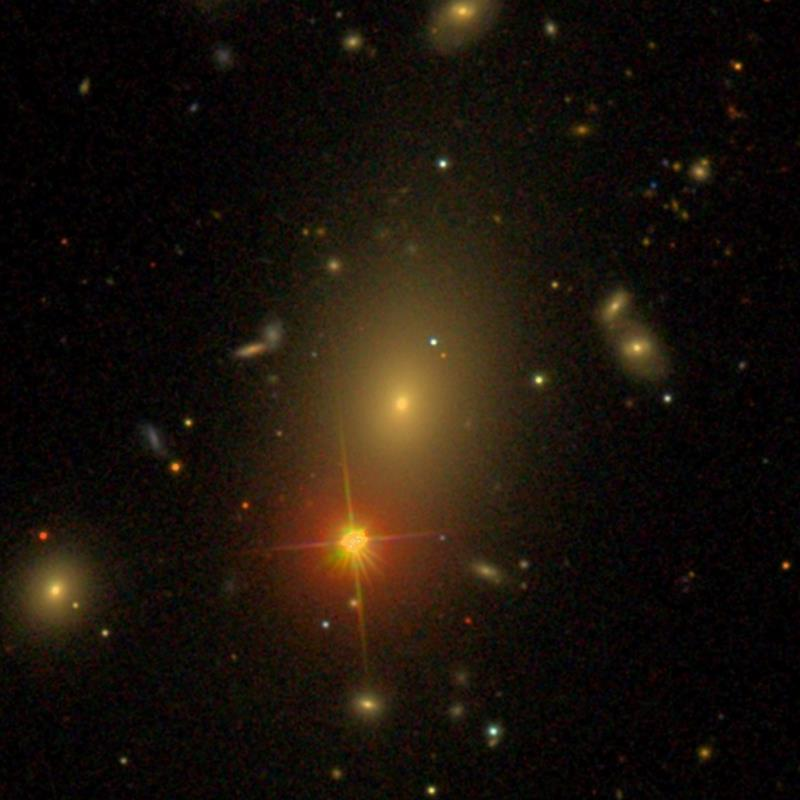
- SDSS image of NGC 6051

Observation data (J2000 epoch)
- Constellation: Serpens
- Right ascension: 16^{h} 04^{m} 56.6^{s}
- Declination: +23° 55′ 57.7″
- Redshift: 0.031404
- Heliocentric radial velocity: 9,415 Km/s
- Distance: 453 Mly (138.8 Mpc)
- Group or cluster: AWM 4
- Apparent magnitude (V): 0.19
- Apparent magnitude (B): 0.26
- Surface brightness: 13.71

Characteristics
- Type: cD; E
- Size: ~253,000 ly (77.7 kpc) (estimated)
- Apparent size (V): 1.3′ × 0.9′

Other designations
- UGC 10178, MCG +04-38-021, PGC 57006 PGC 57006, UGC 10178, 4C +24.36, MCG +04-38-021, GIN 487

NGC 6051 is a giant elliptical galaxy located in the constellation of Serpens. The galaxy lies 453 million light-years from Earth, which means given its apparent dimensions, the galaxy is around 250,000 light-years across. It is the brightest cluster galaxy inside a relaxed poor cluster called AWM 4, a fossil system, making up of at least 30 galaxy members.

== Observational history ==
NGC 6051 was discovered by Edouard Stephan on June 20, 1881. According to John Louis Emil Dreyer, he described it as faint small round object with a bright middle nucleus and a 10th magnitude star to southeast. SIMBAD and HyperLEDA databases listed NGC 6051 as IC 4588, but according to Harold Corwin, these galaxies are two separate objects. O'Sullivan and associates (2011) have them as separate entities, with NGC 6051 being the central dominant galaxy of a cluster.

== Characteristics ==
NGC 6051 is a Type cD galaxy. It is much more luminous compared to other galaxies in AWM 4, with a low surface brightness profile, but does not have a stellar envelope.

The nucleus in NGC 6051 is considered active and it is a radio galaxy. It is classified as a Fanaroff-Riley class hybrid transition of Type I and Type II. Hosting a wide-angle tailed powerful radio source, NGC 6051 contains two reflection-symmetrical wiggled radio jets and large radio lobes emerging from its radio core by ~ 80 kiloparsecs (kpc). The most accepted theory for this active galactic nuclei (AGN) activity, is the presence of a supermassive black hole. The mass of the black hole in NGC 6051 is estimated to be 9.57 ± 0.02 solar masses (M_{☉}; 1.9030×10^{31} ± 4.0×10^{28} kg) based on the M_{BH} - M_{K} correlation (a mapping from brightness of the observed black hole to the mass of objects observed by the Two Micron All Sky Survey in the K_{s}-band).

According to the jet to counterjet brightness ratio, the central ~ 10 kpc jet region of NGC 6051 is potentially orientated closer to the plane of the sky. From the analysis of gradually steepening spectral index, the jets and lobes have an estimated lifetime of 160 million years old. This indicates the source of NGC 6051 is old.

A study has found traces of iron inside the entrained gas produced from the central region of NGC 6051, with a mass of about 1,400,000 solar masses (M_{☉}; 2.8×10^{36} kg). With the energy amount of 4.5 × 10^{57} erg, the gas might been transported out from the galaxy by its jets, to a certain extent of enriching the intracluster medium.

== See also ==
- List of NGC objects (5001–6000)
- NGC 6166
- NGC 4889
