= NGC 6195 =

Galaxy in the constellation Hercules

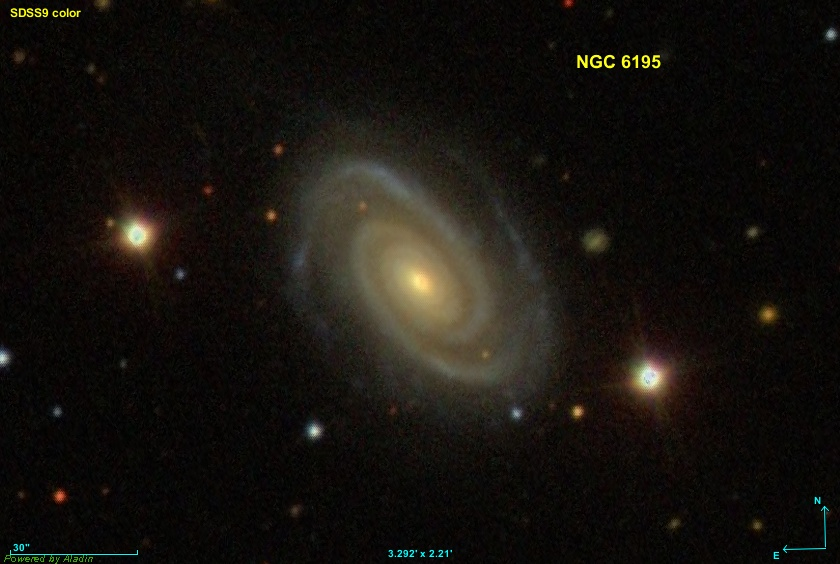
- NGC 6195 imaged by SDSS

Observation data (J2000 epoch)
- Constellation: Hercules
- Right ascension: 16^{h} 36^{m} 32.5835^{s}
- Declination: +39° 01′ 40.475″
- Redshift: 0.029986±0.00000861
- Heliocentric radial velocity: 8,990±3 km/s
- Distance: 466.40 ± 13.64 Mly (143.000 ± 4.183 Mpc)
- Group or cluster: Abell 2199
- Apparent magnitude (V): 14.0g

Characteristics
- Type: Sb
- Size: ~217,100 ly (66.56 kpc) (estimated)
- Apparent size (V): 1.48′ × 0.83′

Other designations
- IRAS F16348+3907, 2MASX J16363253+3901408, UGC 10469, MCG +07-34-118, PGC 58596, CGCG 224-075

NGC 6195 is a large spiral galaxy in the constellation of Hercules. Its velocity with respect to the cosmic microwave background is 9,005±3 km/s, which corresponds to a Hubble distance of 433.2 ± 30.3 Mly (132.82 ± 9.30 Mpc). Additionally, four non-redshift measurements give a farther mean distance of 466.40 ± 13.64 Mly (143.000 ± 4.183 Mpc). It was discovered by German-British astronomer William Herschel on 30 May 1791.

NGC 6195 is a Seyfert I galaxy, i.e. it has a quasar-like nucleus with very high surface brightnesses whose spectra reveal strong, high-ionisation emission lines, but unlike quasars, the host galaxy is clearly detectable. It is also a LINER galaxy, i.e. a galaxy whose nucleus has an emission spectrum characterized by broad lines of weakly ionized atoms.

== Abell 2199 cluster ==
NGC 6195 is a member of the galaxy cluster Abell 2199.

== Supernova ==
One supernova has been observed in NGC 6195:

- SN 1975K (type unknown, mag. 17.8) was discovered by American astronomer Charles Kowal on 9 August 1975.

== See also ==
- List of NGC objects (6001–7000)
