= NGC 6142 =

Galaxy in the constellation Corona Borealis

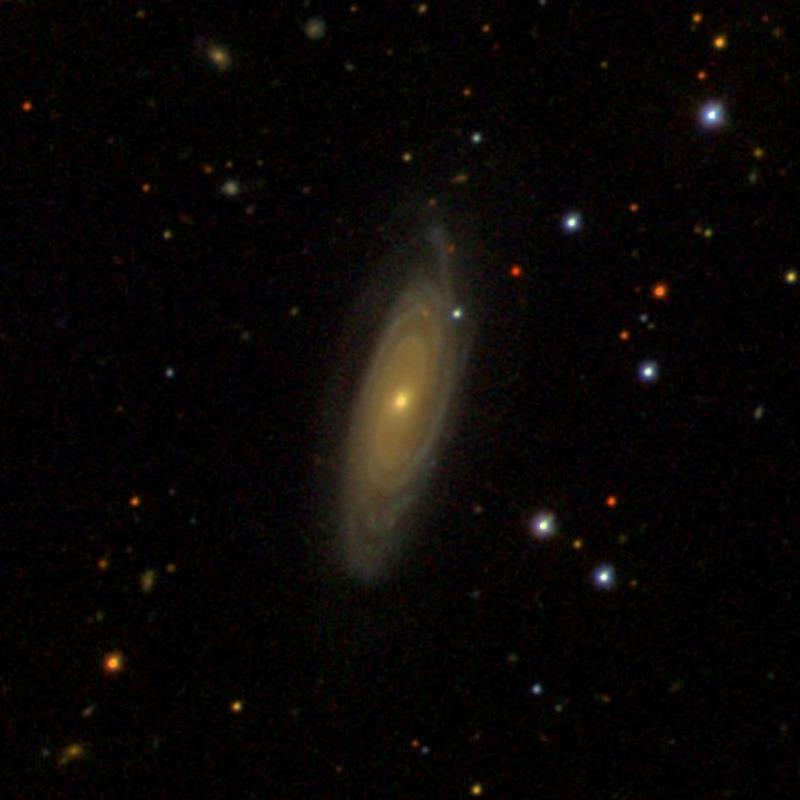
- NGC 6142 imaged by SDSS

Observation data (J2000 epoch)
- Constellation: Corona Borealis
- Right ascension: 16^{h} 23^{m} 21.0702^{s}
- Declination: +37° 15′ 30.466″
- Redshift: 0.033843±0.0000113
- Heliocentric radial velocity: 10,146±3 km/s
- Distance: 489.7 ± 34.3 Mly (150.15 ± 10.51 Mpc)
- Group or cluster: Abell 2199
- Apparent magnitude (V): 14.3g

Characteristics
- Type: Sb
- Size: ~295,700 ly (90.66 kpc) (estimated)
- Apparent size (V): 1.75′ × 0.59′

Other designations
- 2MASX J16232109+3715305, UGC 10366, MCG +06-36-041, PGC 57984, CGCG 196-056

NGC 6142 is a large spiral galaxy in the constellation of Corona Borealis. Its velocity with respect to the cosmic microwave background is 10,180±4 km/s, which corresponds to a Hubble distance of 489.7 ± 34.3 Mly (150.15 ± 10.51 Mpc). It was discovered by German-British astronomer William Herschel on 30 May 1791.

== Galaxy cluster ==
NGC 6142 is a member of the galaxy cluster known as Abell 2199.

== Supernova ==
One supernova has been observed in NGC 6142:

- SN 2006R (Type Ia, mag. 17.5) was discovered by Tim Puckett and Alex Langoussis on 26 January 2006.

== See also ==
- List of NGC objects (6001–7000)
