= NGC 6137 =

Galaxy in the constellation of Corona Borealis

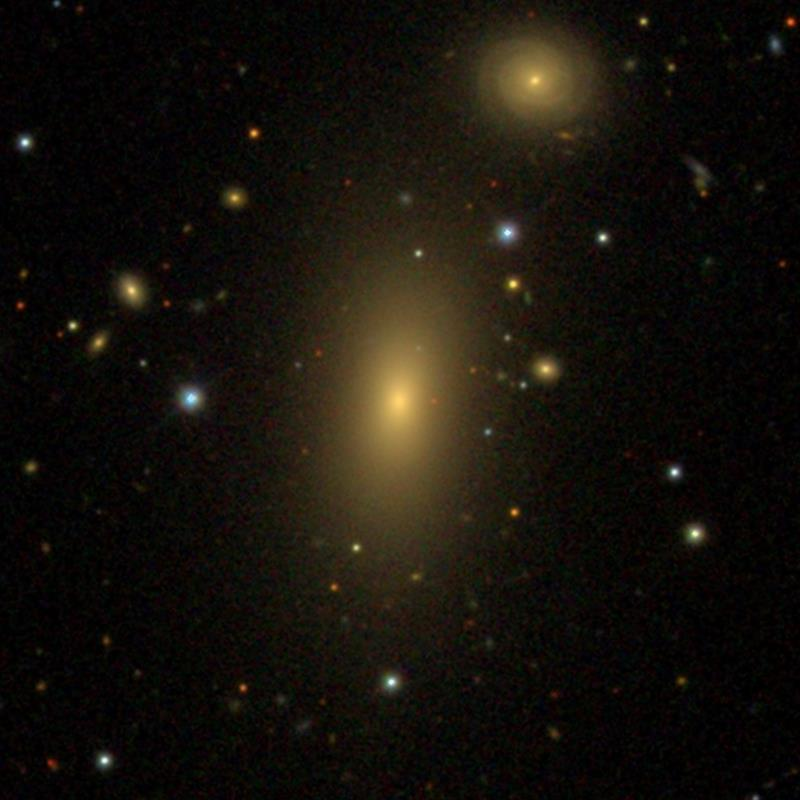
- The galaxy NGC 6137. Above right of the image is PGC 57964.

Observation data (J2000 epoch)
- Constellation: Corona Borealis
- Right ascension: 16^{h} 23^{m} 03.12^{s}
- Declination: +37° 55′ 20.49″
- Redshift: 0.031031
- Heliocentric radial velocity: 9303 km/s
- Distance: 449 Mly (137.71 ± 9.64 Mpc
- Apparent magnitude (V): 13.1

Characteristics
- Type: E
- Size: ~198,800 ly (60.96 kpc) (estimated)

Other designations
- UGC 10364, HOLM 744A, PGC 57966, MCG +06-36-039, RX J1622.9+3755, CGCG 196-053, NVSS J162304+375524

NGC 6137 is an elliptical galaxy located in the constellation of Corona Borealis. The Hubble distance of the galaxy is 137.7 ± 9.6 megaparsecs or 449 million light-years, and it was first discovered by the German-British astronomer by the name of William Herschel in 1787 but also observed by John Herschel in 1826. It is also a member of Abell 2199.

== Description ==
NGC 6137 is classified as a head-tail radio galaxy. When observed with radio imaging, it has a radio core described as powerful (10^{23} Hz^{−1}) at 5 GHz frequencies. There is also a tail extension present that elongates in an eastern direction from the galaxy corresponding to a distance of 16 kiloparsecs. Observation made with the Very Large Array (VLA) found the tail is diffused, with its direction perpendicular to a small jet.

Further radio imaging by the VLA has found there are two radio jets present in the galaxy on opposite sides. These, in turn, have symmetrical appearances with an extent of 10 arcseconds and are embedded inside its optical and X-ray structure. In addition, the jets have a bending angle towards the east direction. Other observations made with Very Long Baseline Interferometry (VLBI) showed the jet is one-sided instead, with a slightly misaligned jet on parsec-scales, although it has the same orientation like the jet on kiloparsec scales at 160°. Traces of X-ray emission are also present, likely originating from the source of hot coronae.

The supermassive black hole lying in the center of the galaxy is estimated to be around 6.46 × 10^{8} M_{☉}.
