= NGC 6145 =

Galaxy in the constellation Hercules

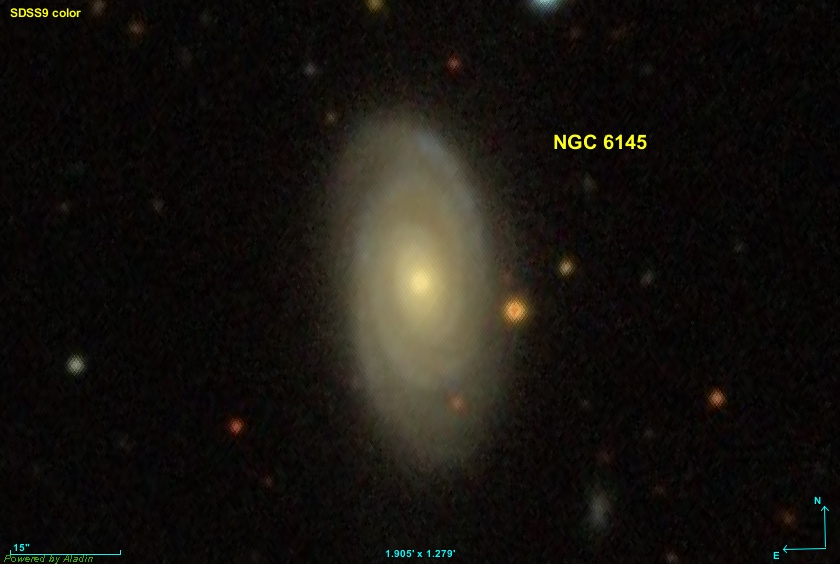
- NGC 6145 imaged by SDSS

Observation data (J2000 epoch)
- Constellation: Hercules
- Right ascension: 16^{h} 25^{m} 02.3795^{s}
- Declination: +40° 56′ 47.926″
- Redshift: 0.028671±0.0000105
- Heliocentric radial velocity: 8,595±3 km/s
- Distance: 414.8 ± 29.0 Mly (127.17 ± 8.90 Mpc)
- Group or cluster: Abell 2199
- Apparent magnitude (V): 14.5g

Characteristics
- Type: Sb
- Size: ~149,000 ly (45.68 kpc) (estimated)
- Apparent size (V): 0.98′ × 0.5′

Other designations
- HOLM 747A, 2MASX J16250238+4056478, MCG +07-34-021, PGC 58074, CGCG 224-017

NGC 6145 is a spiral galaxy in the constellation of Hercules. Its velocity with respect to the cosmic microwave background is 8,622±4 km/s, which corresponds to a Hubble distance of 414.8 ± 29.0 Mly (127.17 ± 8.90 Mpc). Additionally, one non-redshift measurement gives a farther distance of 460 Mly (140 Mpc). It was discovered by British astronomer John Herschel on 12 May 1828.

NGC 6145 is a LINER galaxy, i.e. a galaxy whose nucleus has an emission spectrum characterized by broad lines of weakly ionized atoms.

== Galaxy group and cluster ==
NGC 6145 and NGC 6147 are listed together as Holm 747 in Erik Holmberg's A Study of Double and Multiple Galaxies Together with Inquiries into some General Metagalactic Problems, published in 1937. NGC 6145 is also part of the galaxy cluster known as Abell 2199.

== Supernova ==
One supernova has been observed in NGC 6145:

- SN 2025qmk (Type II, mag. 19.28) was discovered by The Young Supernova Experiment (YSE) on 6 July 2025.

== See also ==
- List of NGC objects (6001–7000)
