= IC 4617 =

Galaxy in the constellation Hercules

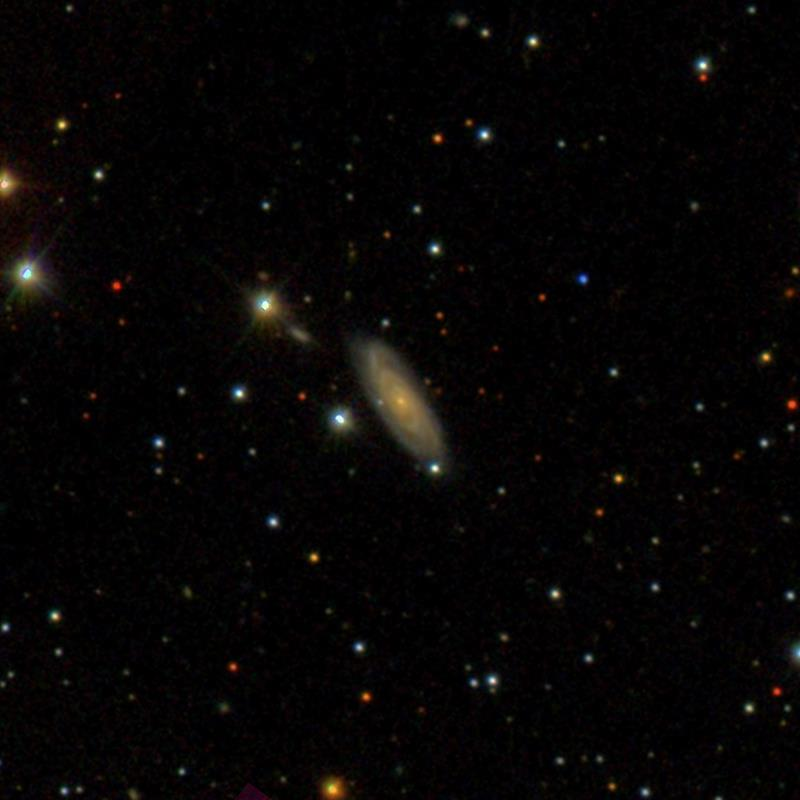
- Sloan Digital Sky Survey of spiral galaxy IC 4617

Observation data (J2000 epoch)
- Constellation: Hercules
- Right ascension: 16^{h} 42^{m} 08.06^{s}
- Declination: +36° 41′ 02.70″
- Redshift: 0.036467
- Heliocentric radial velocity: 10,734 ± 3 km/s
- Distance: 553 Mly (169.5 Mpc)
- Group or cluster: Abell 2199
- Apparent magnitude (V): 12.647

Characteristics
- Type: Sbc
- Size: 115,000 ly

Other designations
- 2MASX J16420807+3641025, SDSS J164208.06+364102.6, NSA 046415, UNAM-KIAS 1479, 2MASS J16420808+3641026, LEDA 2085077

IC 4617 is a type Sbc spiral galaxy located in the constellation Hercules. It is located 553 million light-years from the Solar System and has an estimated diameter of 115,000 light-years thus making it slightly larger than the Milky Way. The galaxy was discovered by the American astronomer Edward Emerson Barnard although no date of discovery was confirmed. IC 4617 is a member of Abell 2199 and happens to lie in the same area of sky as the globular cluster Messier 13.
