= NGC 6120 =

Galaxy in the constellation Corona Borealis

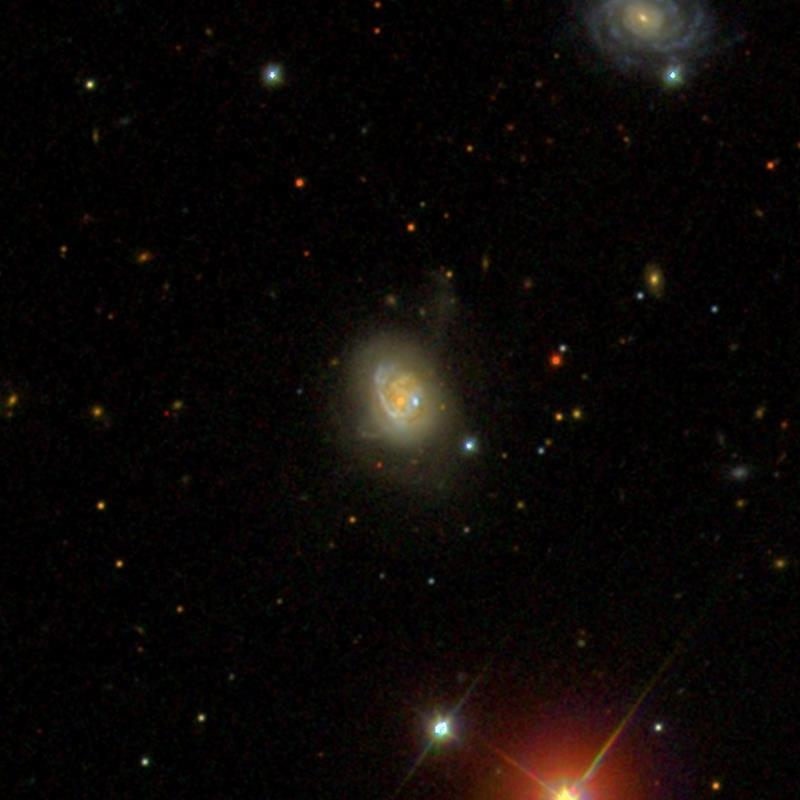
- SDSS image of NGC 6120

Observation data (J2000 epoch)
- Constellation: Corona Borealis
- Right ascension: 16^{h} 19^{m} 48.11646^{s}
- Declination: +37° 46′ 27.6833″
- Redshift: 0.030655
- Heliocentric radial velocity: 9049 km/s
- Distance: 440 Mly (134.9 Mpc)
- Group or cluster: Abell 2199
- Apparent magnitude (B): 14.3

Characteristics
- Type: Sb

Other designations
- UGC 10343, MCG +06-36-029, PGC 57842

NGC 6120 is a peculiar spiral galaxy located roughly 440 million light-years (130 Megaparsecs) away from the Sun. It is located in the northern constellation of Corona Borealis, and is a member of the Abell 2199 galaxy cluster.
