= Messier 13 =

Globular cluster in the constellation Hercules

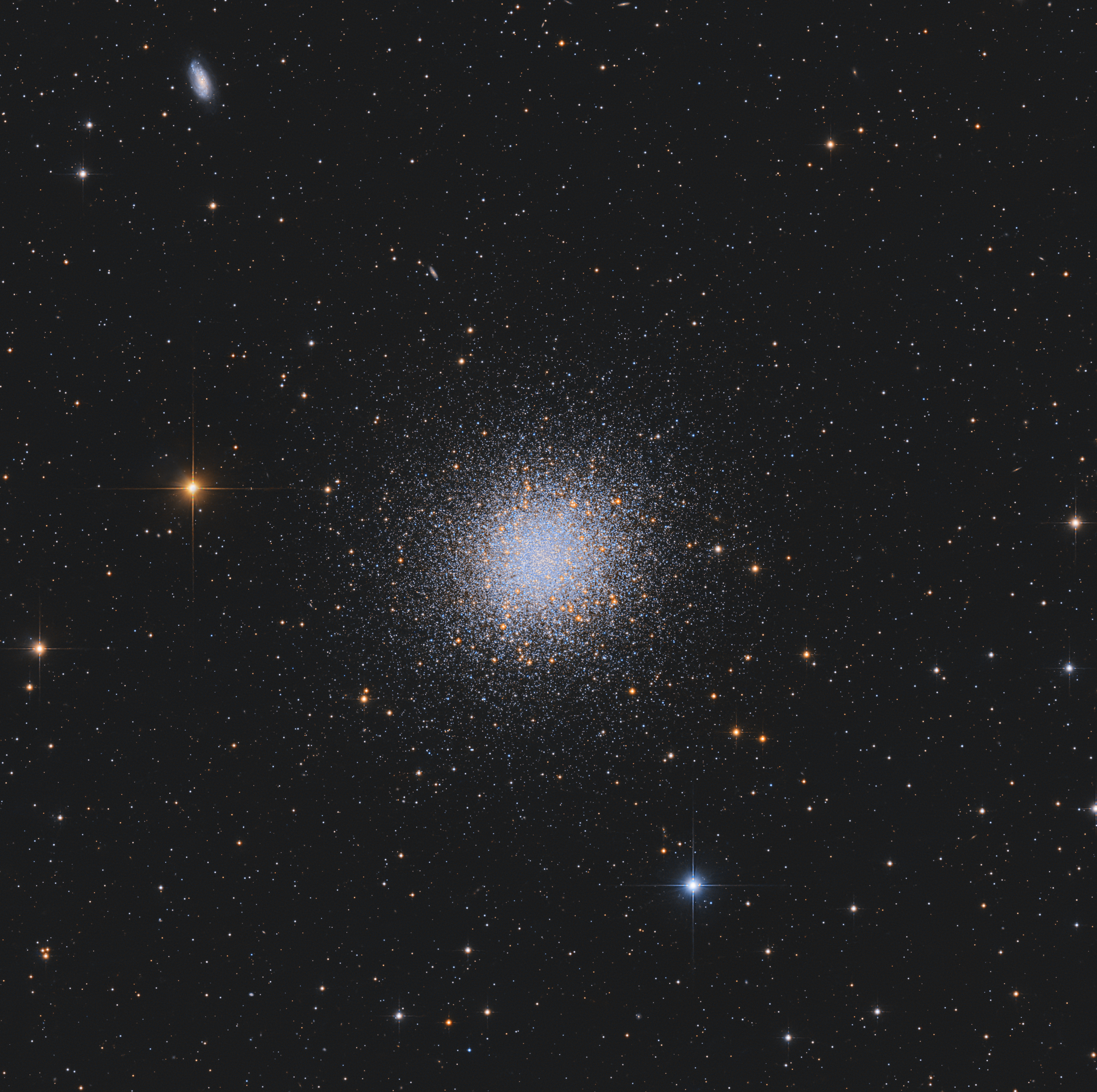
- Globular cluster Messier 13 in Hercules captured with an amateur telescope in 2025.

Observation data (J2000 epoch)
- Class: V
- Constellation: Hercules
- Right ascension: 16^{h} 41^{m} 41.24^{s}
- Declination: +36° 27′ 35.5″
- Distance: 24.1 kly (7.4 kpc)
- Apparent magnitude (V): 5.8
- Apparent dimensions (V): 20 arcminutes

Physical characteristics
- Absolute magnitude: –8.5
- Mass: 6×10^{5} M_{☉}
- Radius: 84 ly
- Metallicity: [Fe/H] = –1.33 dex
- Estimated age: 11.65 Gyr
- Notable features: One of the best-known clusters of the Northern Hemisphere
- Other designations: NGC 6205

Messier 13, or M13 (also designated NGC 6205 and sometimes called the Great Globular Cluster in Hercules, the Hercules Globular Cluster, or the Great Hercules Cluster), is a globular cluster of several hundred thousand stars in the constellation of Hercules.

== Discovery and visibility ==
Messier 13 was discovered by Edmond Halley in 1714, and cataloged by Charles Messier on June 1, 1764, into his list of objects not to mistake for comets; Messier's list, including Messier 13, eventually became known as the Messier catalog. It is located at right ascension 16^{h} 41.7^{m}, declination +36° 28'. Messier 13 is often described by astronomers as the most magnificent globular cluster visible to northern observers.

About one third of the way from Vega to Arcturus, four bright stars in Hercules form the Keystone asterism, the broad torso of the hero. M13 can be seen in this asterism 2/3 of the way north (by west) from Zeta to Eta Herculis. With an apparent magnitude of 5.8, Messier 13 may be visible to the naked eye with averted vision on dark nights. Messier 13 is prominent in traditional binoculars as a bright, round patch of light. Its diameter is about 23 arcminutes and it is readily viewable in small telescopes. At least four inches of telescope aperture resolves stars in Messier 13's outer extent as small pinpoints of light. However, only larger telescopes resolve stars further into the center of the cluster. The cluster is visible throughout the year from latitudes greater than 36 degrees north, with the longest visibility during Northern Hemisphere spring and summer.

Nearby to Messier 13 is NGC 6207, a 12th-magnitude edge-on galaxy that lies 28 arcminutes directly northeast. A small galaxy, IC 4617, lies halfway between NGC 6207 and M13, north-northeast of the large globular cluster's center. At low powers the cluster is bracketed by two seventh-magnitude stars.

== Characteristics ==
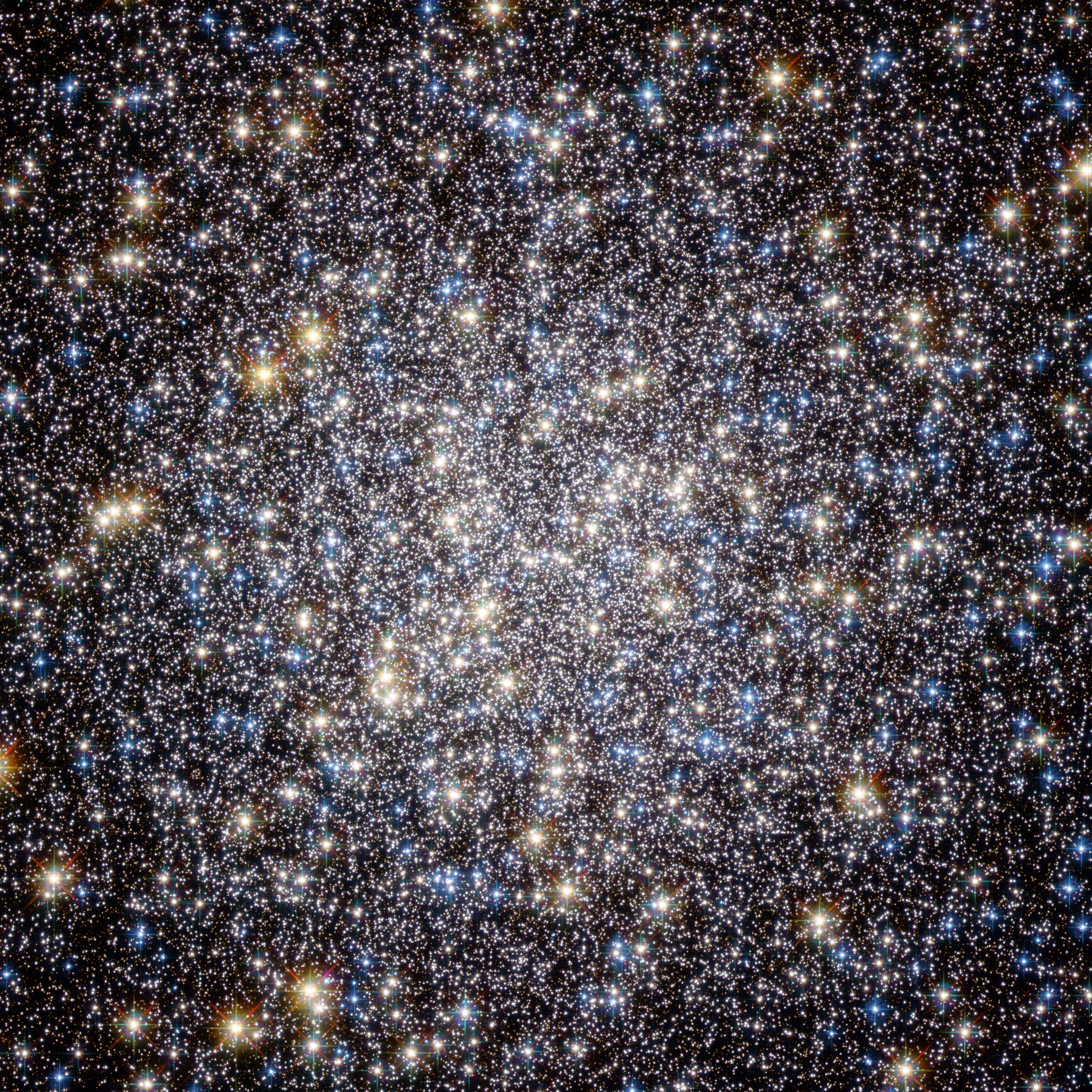
The dense core of Messier 13.

About 145 light-years in diameter, M13 is composed of several hundred thousand stars, with estimates varying from around 300,000 to over half a million. The brightest star in the cluster is a red giant, the variable star V11, also known as V1554 Hercules, with an apparent visual magnitude of 11.95. M13 is 22,200 to 25,000 light-years away from Earth, and the globular cluster is one of over one hundred that orbit the center of the Milky Way.

The stars in this cluster are firmly in the Population II category, markedly lower in metals than Population I stars like the Sun and most other stars in the Sun's close proximity. M13 as a whole has only about 4.6% as much iron as the Sun does.

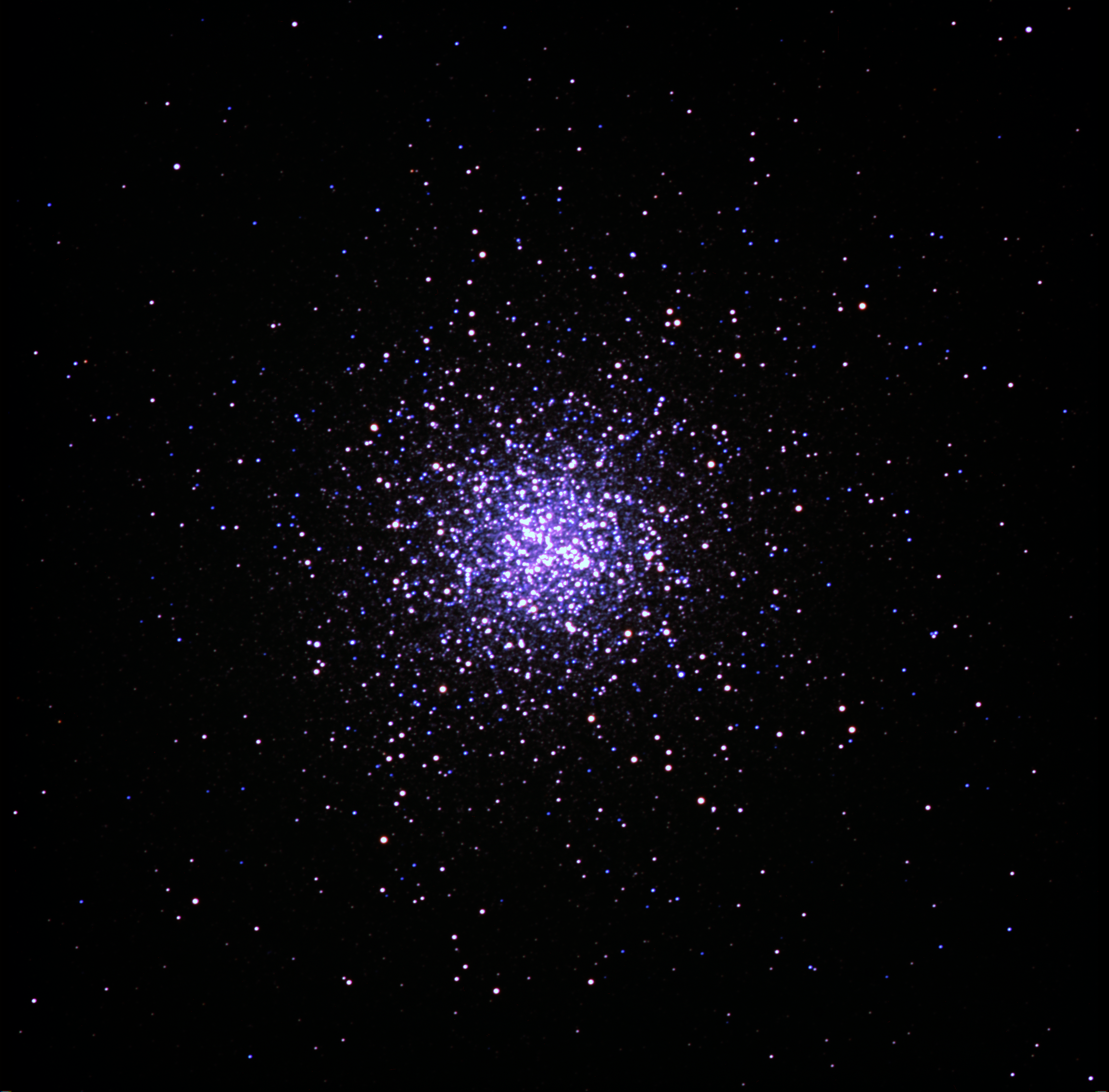
M13 from the Lowell Discovery Telescope 5 120s stack in B,V,R

Single stars in this globular cluster were first resolved in 1779. Compared to the stars in the neighborhood of the Sun, the stars of the M13 population are more than a hundred times more densely packed. They are so close together that they sometimes collide and produce new stars. The stars, known as "blue stragglers", appear younger and are particularly interesting to astronomers.

The last three variables (V63, V64 and V65) were discovered from Spain in April 2021, March 2022 and January 2024, respectively.

In 2007, a paper was published suggesting the possibility of an intermediate-mass black hole of up to 13,000 solar masses at the centre of the cluster, but this is heavily disputed.

== Arecibo message ==
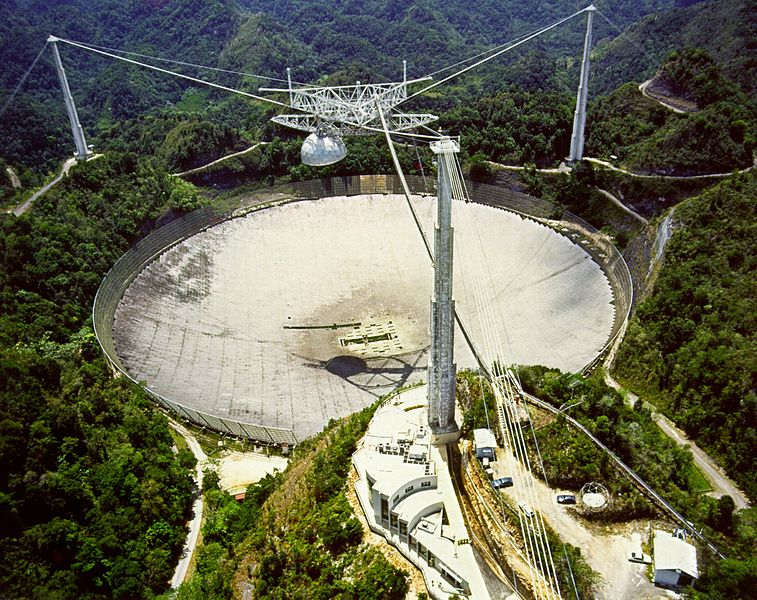
The Arecibo Observatory radio telescope that transmitted the message.

The 1974 Arecibo message, which contained encoded information about the human race, DNA, atomic numbers, Earth's position and other information, was beamed from the Arecibo Observatory radio telescope towards Messier 13. It was meant as a demonstration of human technological achievement, rather than a real attempt to enter into a conversation with extraterrestrials. M13 was chosen because it was a large, relatively close star cluster that was available at the time and place of the ceremony. It will take around 25,000 years for the message to reach the cluster, though it will move through space during the transit time; opinions differ as to whether or not the cluster will be in a position to receive the message by the time that it arrives.

== Literary references ==
- The science fiction novellas "Sucker Bait" by Isaac Asimov and the novel Question and Answer by Poul Anderson take place on Troas, a world within M13.
- In the German science fiction series Perry Rhodan, M13 is the location of Arkon, the homeworld of the race of Arkonides.
- In author James Blish 's Cities In Flight, the alien "Web of Hercules" attacks from this cluster.
- In author Dan Simmons' Hyperion Cantos the Hercules cluster is where a copy of Earth was secretly recreated after the original was destroyed.
- In his novel The Sirens of Titan, Kurt Vonnegut writes "Every passing hour brings the Solar System forty-three thousand miles closer to Globular Cluster M13 in Hercules—and still there are some misfits who insist that there is no such thing as progress."
- Messier 13 is the home of the antagonistic aliens in the 1977 space opera The War in Space, who hail from the third planet of a system orbiting a star called Yomi.
- Deliberately engineering a star in Messier 13 to go nova was part of the Cybermen's complicated plot in the 1968 Doctor Who story The Wheel in Space.

== In art ==
- Messier 13 is featured as part of the interior of the dome of St Anne's Church, Kew in London, based on a photograph by NASA. Halley discovered the cluster in 1714, the same year that the church was first dedicated.

== Gallery ==
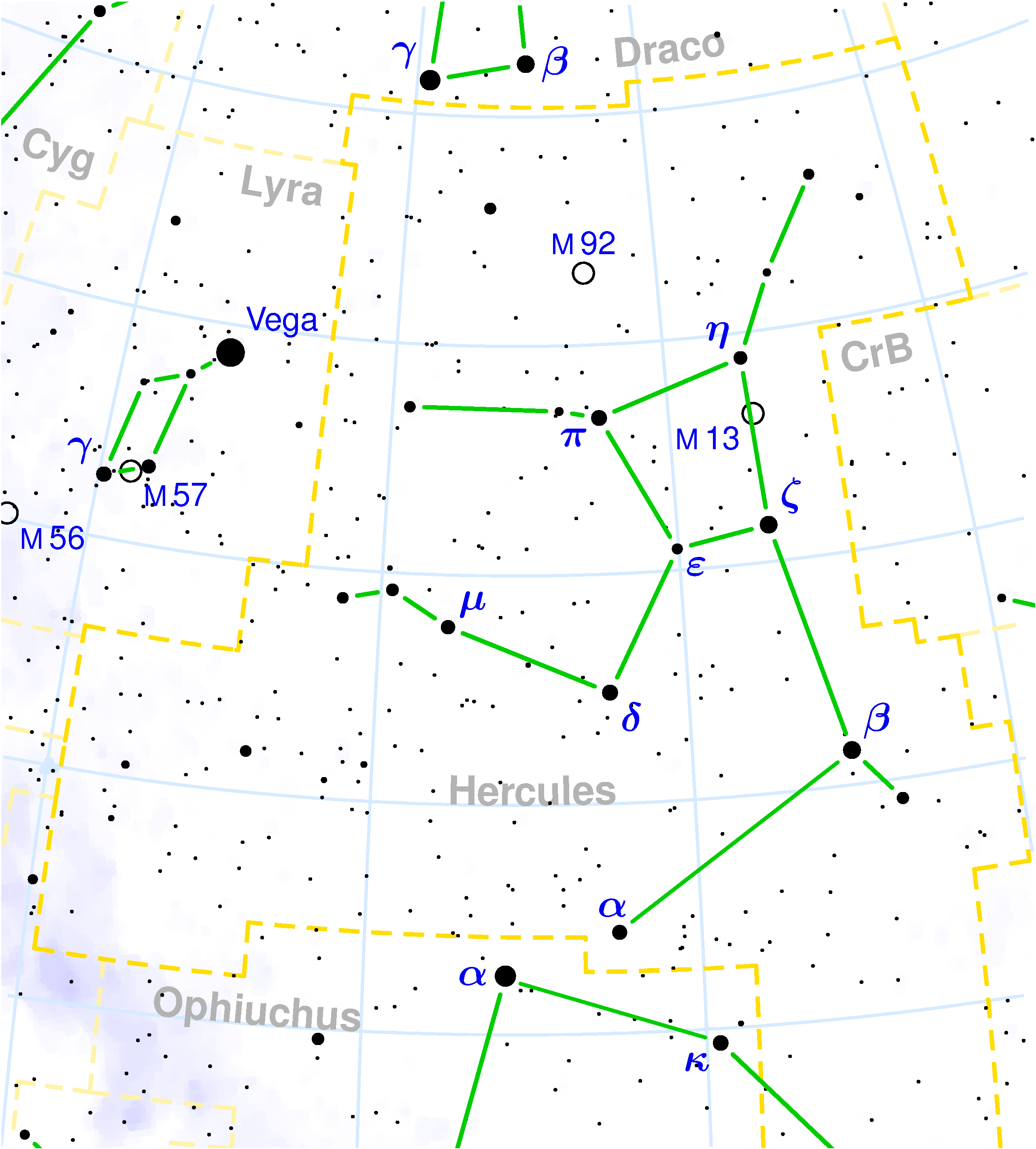
M13 is in the "armpit" of the constellation Hercules.

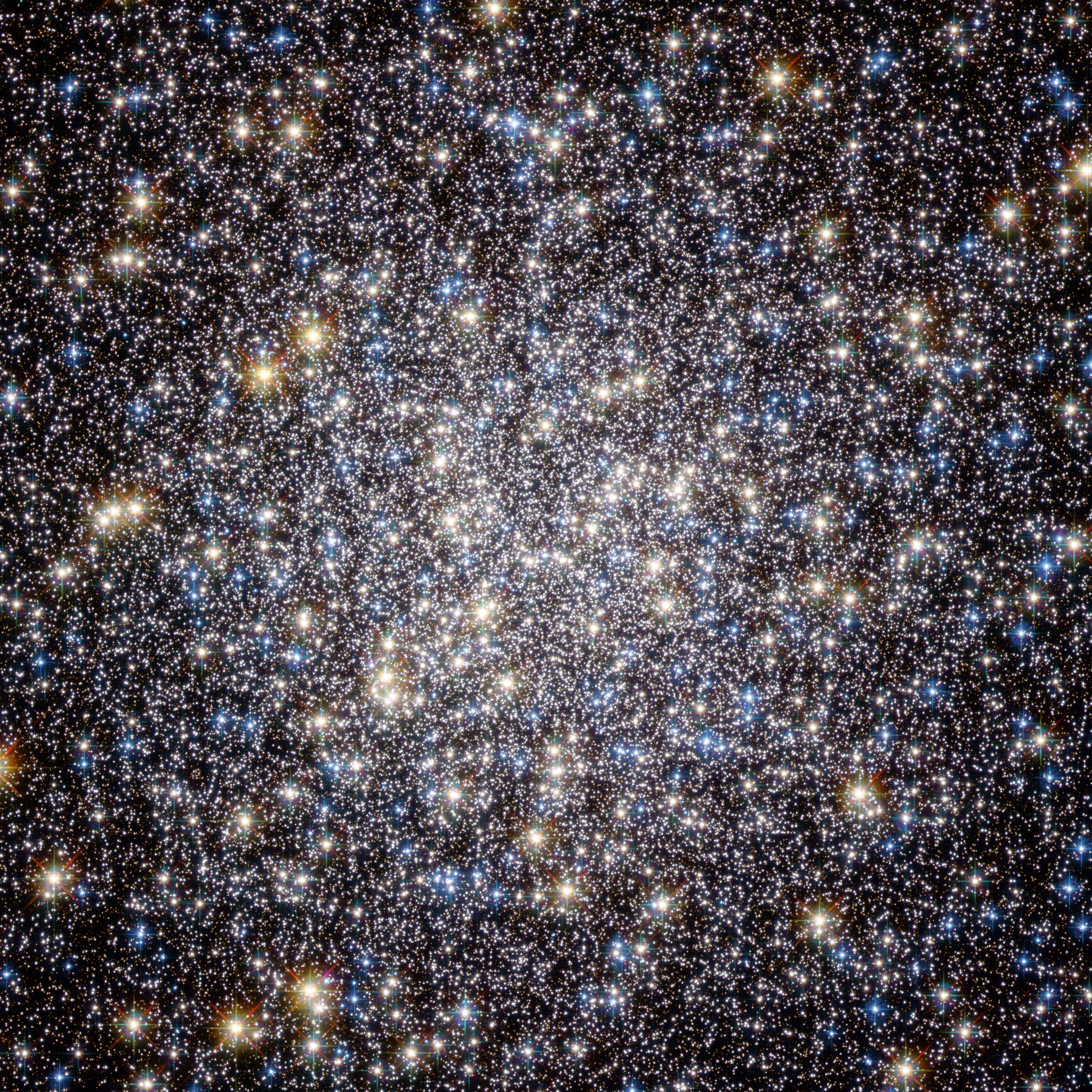
Heart of the Hercules Globular Cluster, Hubble image

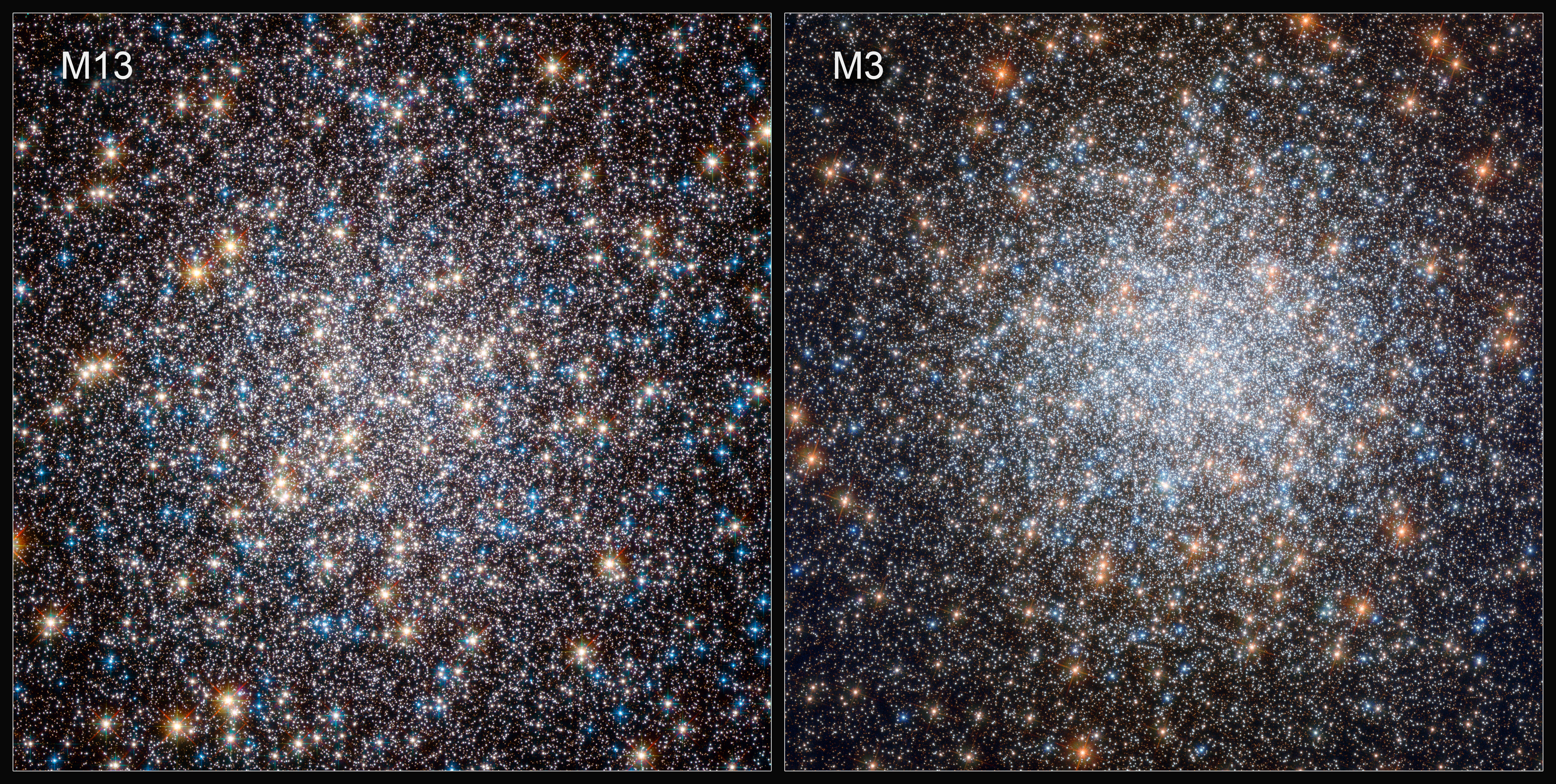
Hubble images comparing M13 and M3

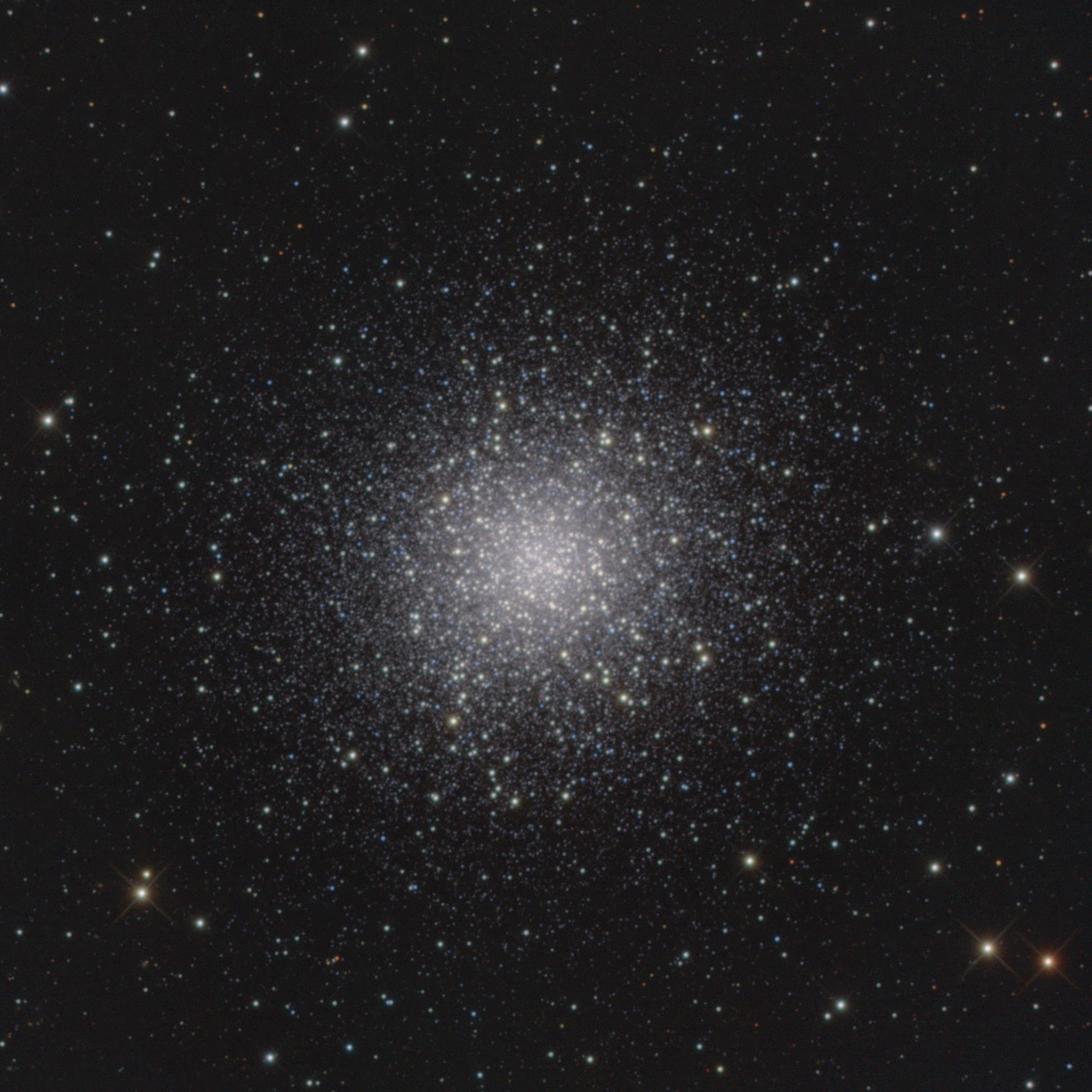
M13 in near infrared and visible light

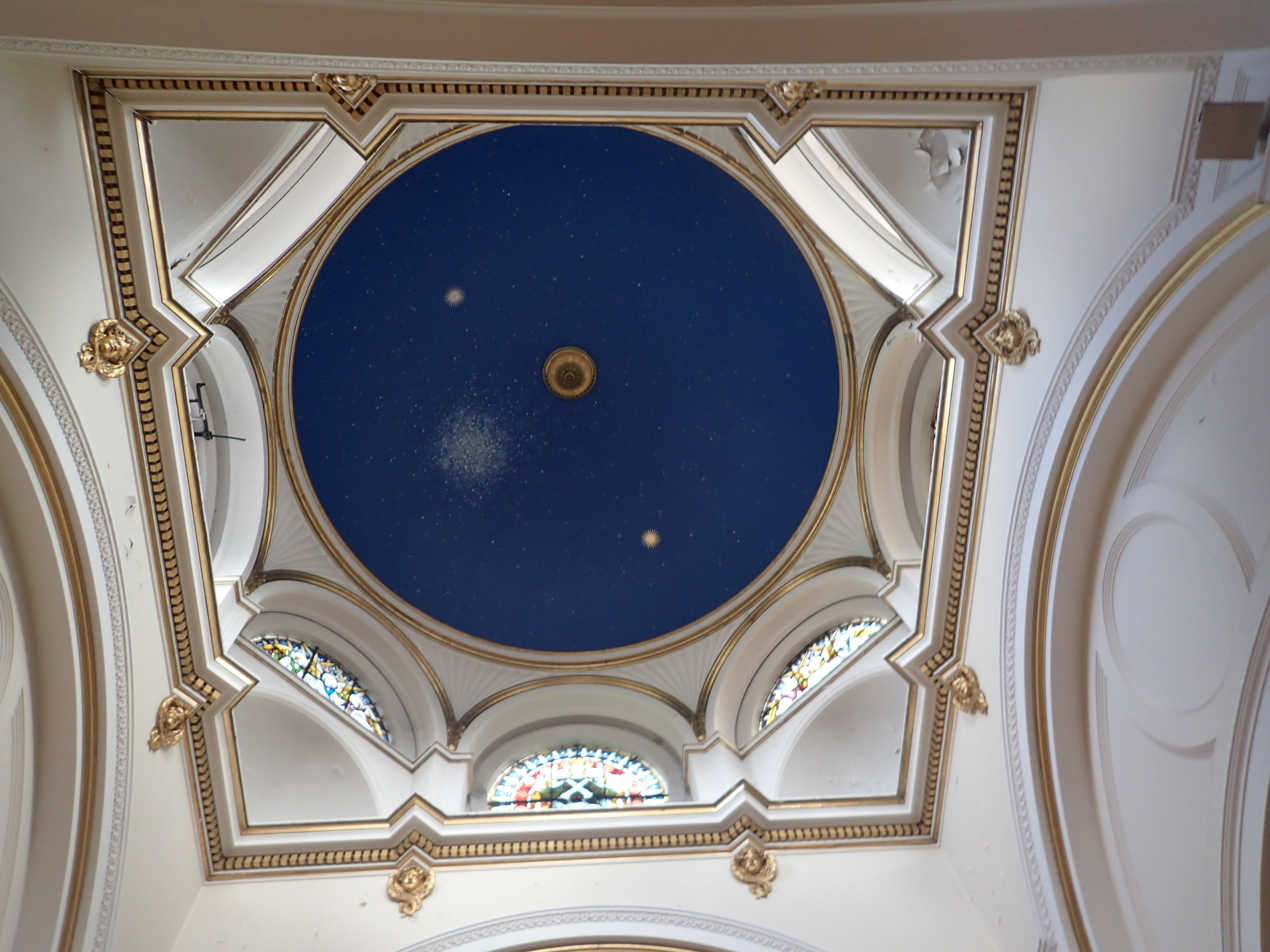
M13 painted on the interior of the dome ceiling of St Anne's Church, Kew.

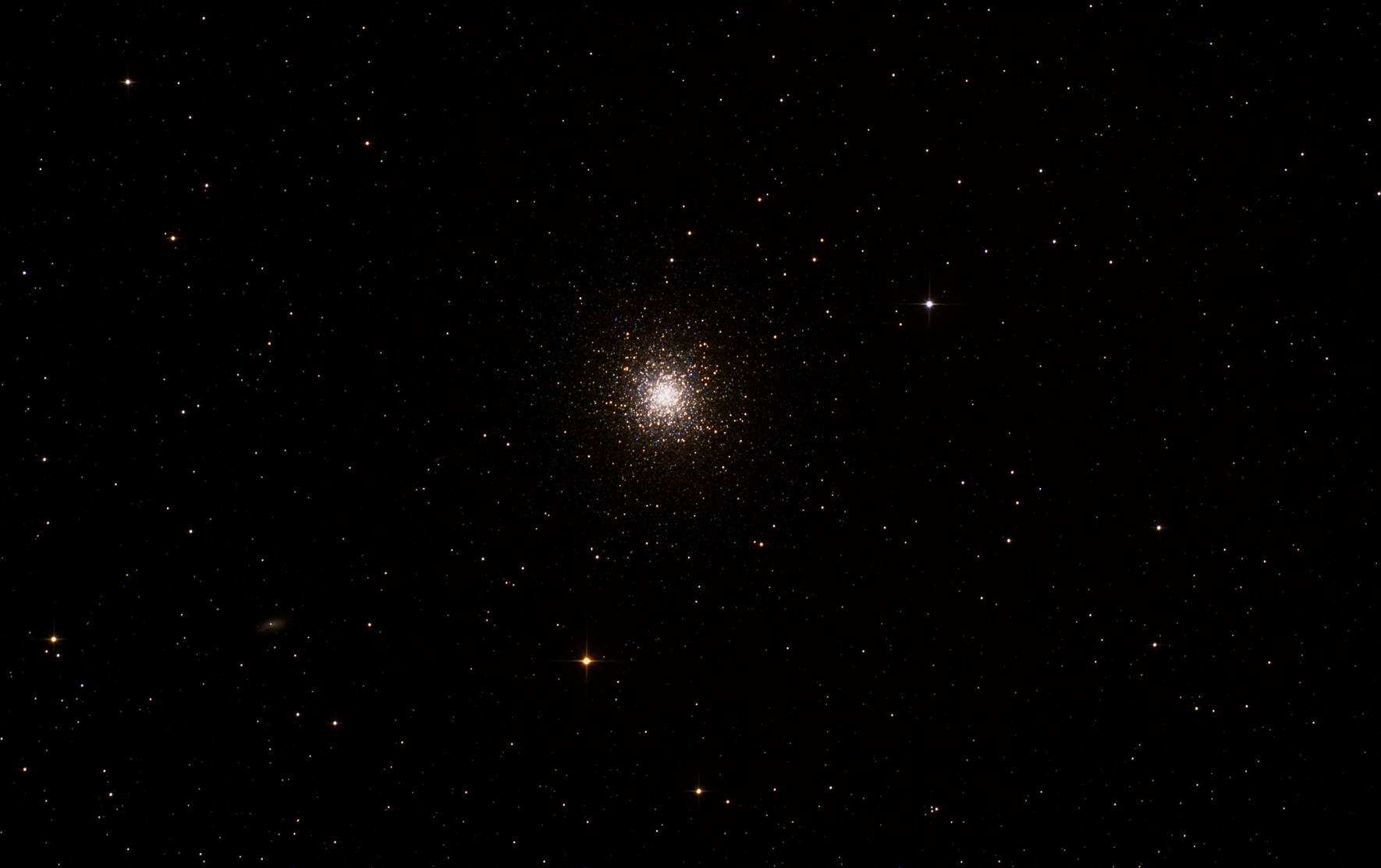
Portrait of Messier 13

== See also ==
- List of globular clusters
- Lists of astronomical objects
- Messier object
- New General Catalogue
