= NGC 6207 =

Galaxy in the constellation Hercules

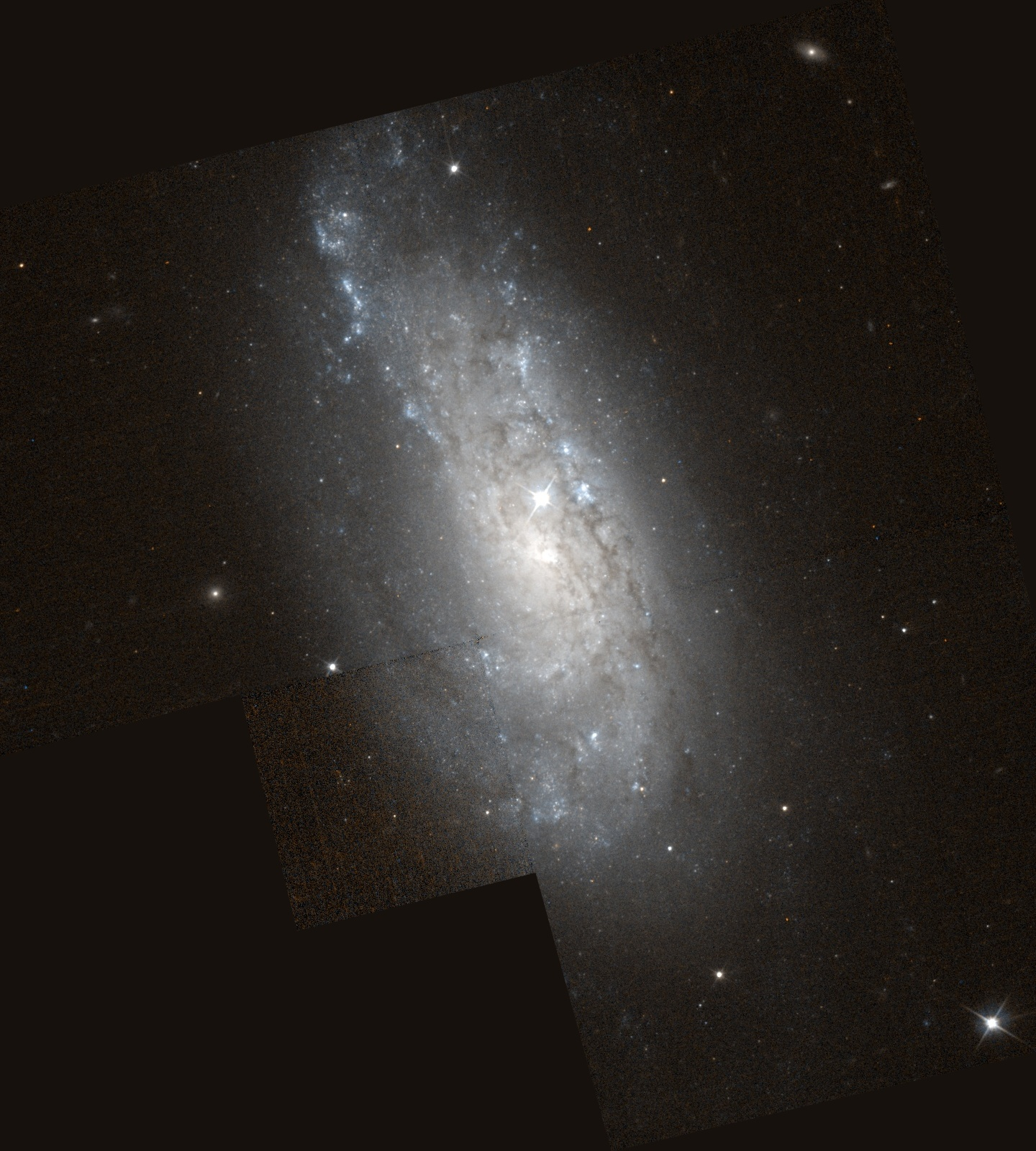
- NGC 6207 as seen through the Hubble Space Telescope

Observation data (J2000 epoch)
- Constellation: Hercules
- Right ascension: 16^{h} 43^{m} 03.7^{s}
- Declination: +36° 49′ 57″
- Redshift: 0.002842±0.000005
- Heliocentric radial velocity: 852±1 km/s
- Galactocentric velocity: 1012±7 km/s
- Apparent magnitude (V): 11.7±0.4
- Absolute magnitude (V): −19.62±0.48

Characteristics
- Type: SA(s)c
- Size: 34,000 light-years
- Apparent size (V): 3.00′ × 1.2′

Other designations
- UGC 10521, MCG 6-37-7, ZWG 197.7, PGC 58827, KUG 1641+369, IRAS 16412+3655, KARA 766
- References: NASA/IPAC extragalactic datatbase, http://spider.seds.org/

NGC 6207 is a spiral galaxy located in the constellation Hercules. It is designated as SA(s)c in the galaxy morphological classification scheme and was discovered by William Herschel on 16 May 1787. NGC 6207 is located at about 30 million light-years from Earth, and its approximate size is around 36,000 light-years across. In the sky, it is located near the globular cluster Messier 13.

== Visibility ==
The galaxy has an approximate brightness of about 11.5, making it extremely faint and would require a telescope with an aperture of around 4 inches at the minimum to get a faint shape. Because of its low surface brightness (approximately 12.6), you would need a telescope of around 6–8 inches to get more detail and clarity.

== Observation History ==
NGC 6207 was discovered by William Herschel on May 16, 1787. It was added onto his extensive list of nebulae as NGC 6207

== Properties ==
It has a diameter measured through the D25 standard – the isophote where the surface brightness of the galaxy reaches 25 mag/arcsec^{2}, to be about 11.03 kiloparsecs (36,00 light-years), making it roughly 36% of the Milky way.

=== Structure ===
The galaxy displays a classic spiral structure, and can be defined as "Small, oval galaxy, evenly bright. Nucleus visible". It also hosts multiple H II regions. This suggests that despite being a relatively quiet galaxy, still hosts on-going star formation activity.

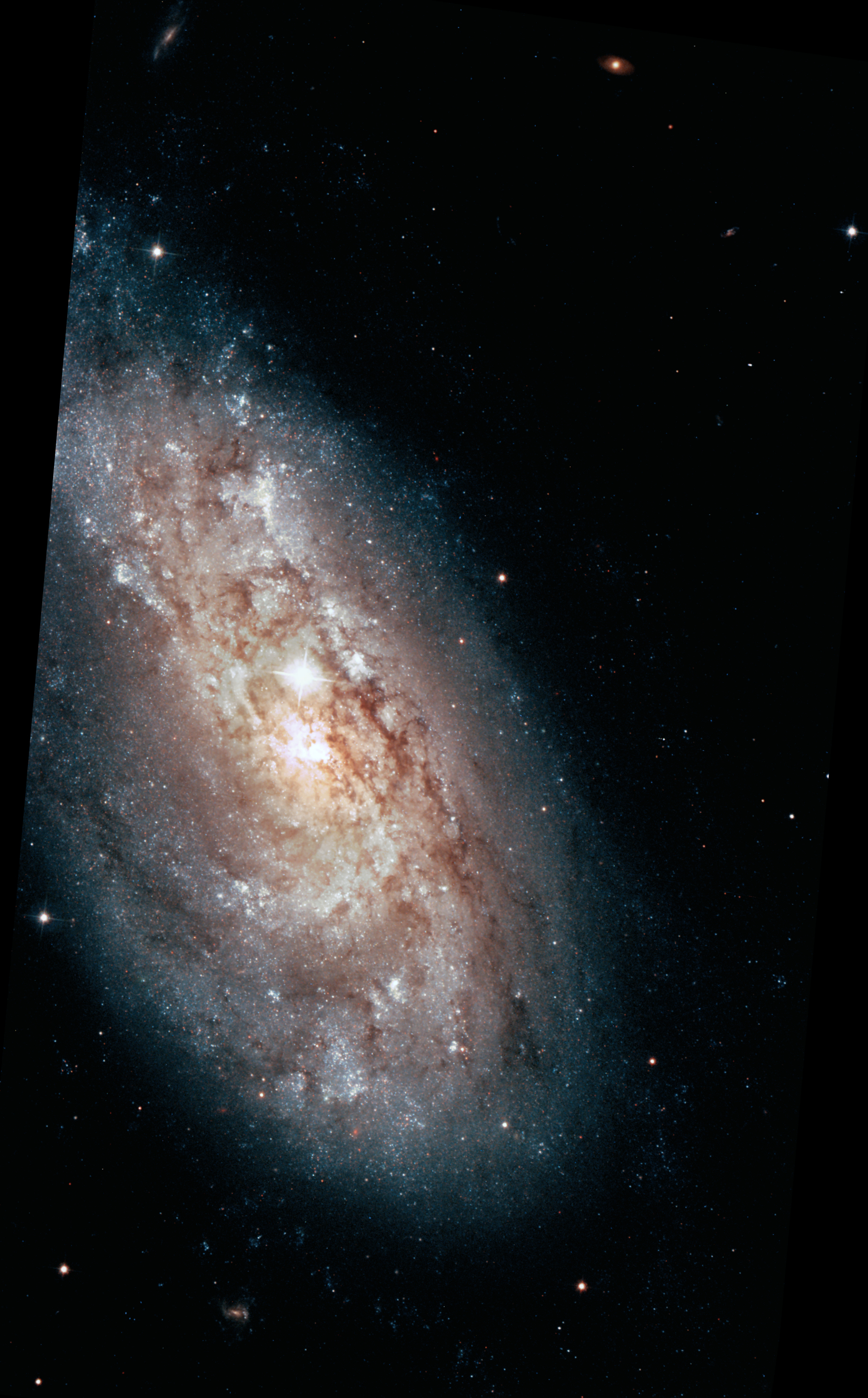
Galaxy NGC 6207, by HST (ACS).

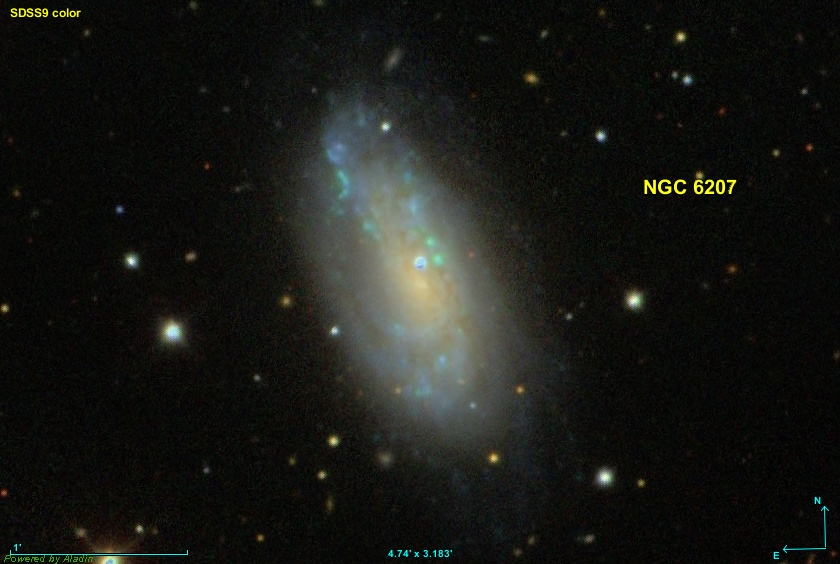
NGC 6207, clearly displayed and labelled, with visible surface features such as tightly wounded spiral arms.

== See also ==
- List of NGC objects (6001–7000)
