= IC 4588 =

Galaxy in the constellation Serpens

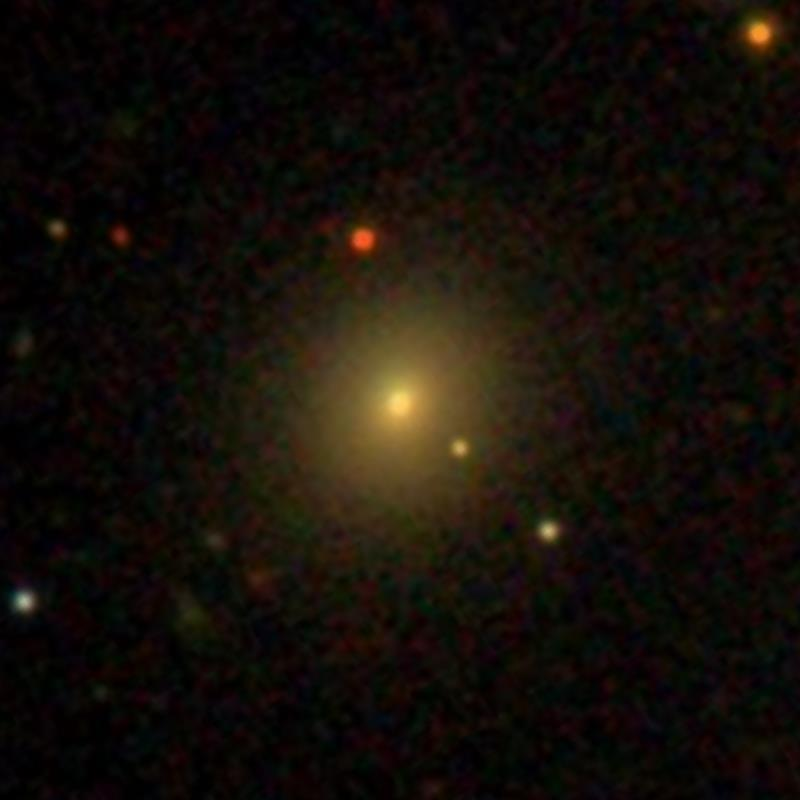

Observation data (J2000 epoch)
- Constellation: Serpens
- Right ascension: 16^{h} 05^{m} 04.24^{s}
- Declination: +23° 55′ 01.69″
- Redshift: 0.053096
- Heliocentric radial velocity: 15,918 km/s
- Distance: 729 Mly (223.5 Mpc)
- Apparent magnitude (V): 15.8

Characteristics
- Type: E
- Size: 64,000 ly
- Apparent size (V): 0.30′ × 0.3′

Other designations
- 2MASS J16050425+2355015, 2MASX J16050427+2355015, LEDA 57025, PGC 57025, SDSS J160504.24+235501.6

IC 4588 is a type E elliptical galaxy located in the constellation Serpens. It is located 729 million light-years from the Solar System and has a dimension of 0.30 x 0.3 arcmin meaning its diameter is 64,000 light-years across. IC 4588 was discovered by Stephane Javelle on July 15, 1903.

In some galactic catalogues, NGC 6051 and IC 4588 have been listed as the same object. However, O'Sullivan and associates (2011) have them as separate entities, with NGC 6051 being the central dominant galaxy of a cluster.

== Supernova ==
One supernova has been discovered in IC 4588 so far: SN 2023ifv.

SN 2023ifv

SN 2023ifv was discovered on May 13, 2023 by ATLAS (Asteroid Terrestrial-impact Last Alert System) which was developed by the University of Hawaii. It was reported by multiple astronomers from University of Hawaii, South African Astronomical Observatory, ESO, UAI Obstech, Oxford/QUB, Queen's University Belfast, Oxford and Harvard; via a cyan-ATLAS filter which was taken using ATLAS Haleakala telescope. The supernova reached a magnitude of 18.

On May 19, 2023, C. Fremling, D. Neill, and Y. Sharma on the behalf of the SDEM Team from Caltech and the Zwicky Transient Facility, confirmed SN 2023ifv to be a Type Ia supernova. The supernova probably resulted from the destruction of a white dwarf in a binary system.
