= NGC 6166 =

Galaxy in the constellation Hercules

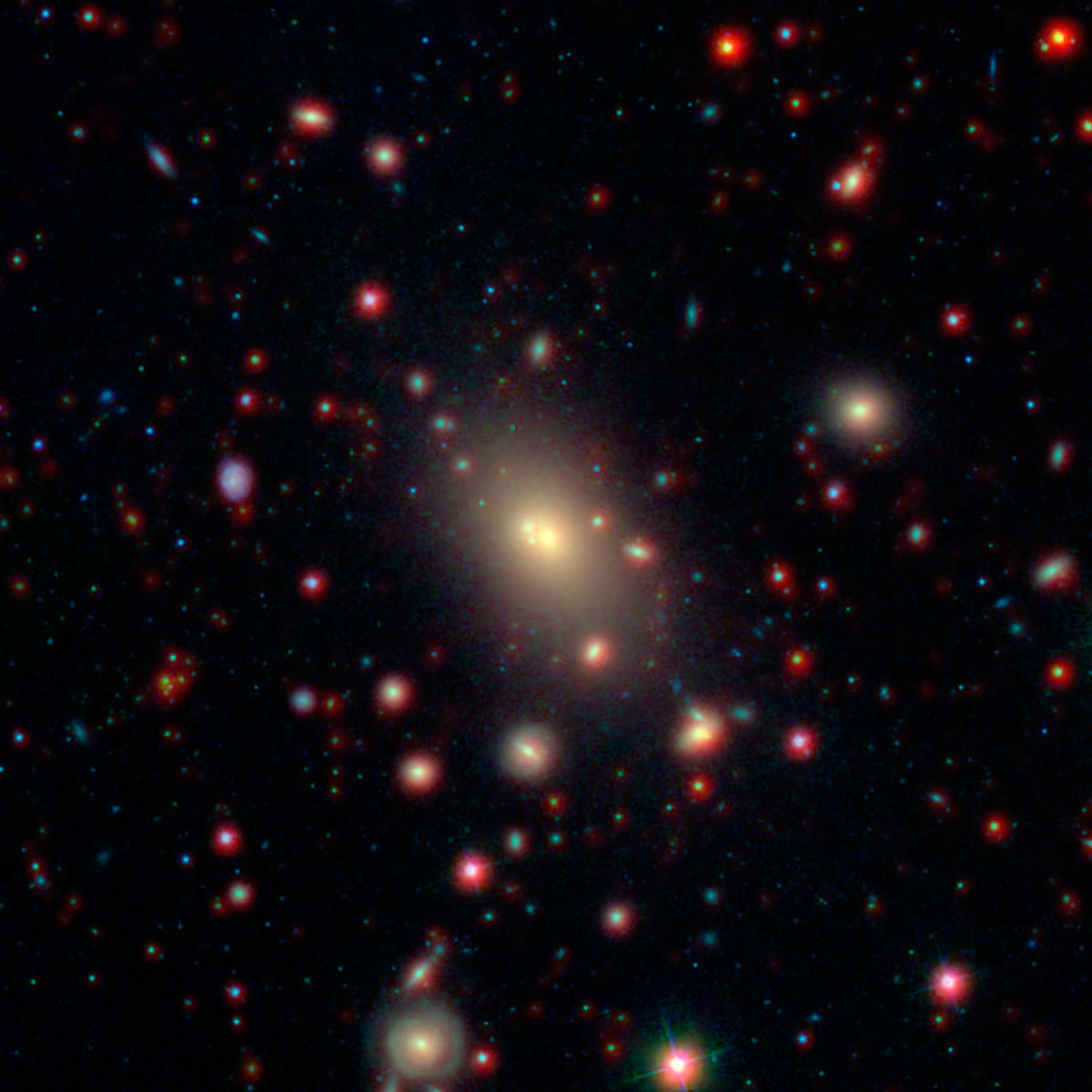
- NGC 6166 by Spitzer Space Telescope

Observation data (J2000 epoch)
- Constellation: Hercules
- Right ascension: 16^{h} 28^{m} 38.276^{s}
- Declination: +39° 33′ 04.97″
- Redshift: z = −0.030354 (minus sign indicates blueshift)
- Heliocentric radial velocity: −9100 km/s
- Distance: 490 Mly (142 Mpc)
- Apparent magnitude (V): 12.78
- Absolute magnitude (V): −24.1

Characteristics
- Type: cD2 pec.
- Apparent size (V): 1.9’ x 1.4’

Other designations
- UGC 10409, PGC 58265, CGCG 2205.6+3107 0504, MCG +07-34-060, 3C 338

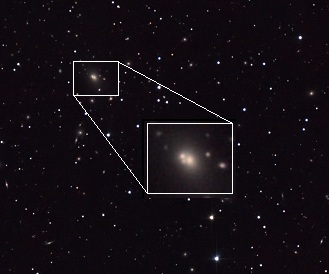
NGC 6166

NGC 6166 is a supergiant elliptical galaxy in the Abell 2199 cluster. It lies 490 million light years away in the constellation Hercules. The primary galaxy in the cluster, it is one of the most luminous galaxies known in terms of X-ray emissions.

== Description ==
NGC 6166 is a supermassive, type cD galaxy, with several smaller galaxies within its envelope.

Suspected to have formed through a number of galaxy collisions, NGC 6166 has a large number of globular clusters (estimated as between 6,200 and 22,000 in 1996) orbiting the galaxy. A 2016 study, however, gave an even higher number (around 39,000) suggesting also that the halo of this galaxy blends smoothly with the intra-cluster medium. Because of that, the galaxy has the richest globular cluster system known. The galaxy harbors a supermassive black hole at its center with a mass of 28.4 billion ^{+2.7}_{−1.8} M_{☉}, nearly 30 billion M_{☉} based on dynamical modelling.

NGC 6166 is known to host an active nucleus, classified as an FR I source, which powers two symmetric parsec-scale radio jets and radio lobes. These are caused by the infall of gas into its center due to a cooling flow that deposits 200 solar masses of gas every year there.

It has been proposed that a number of O-type stars may be present in the center of NGC 6166.

== Supernovae ==
Two supernovae have been observed in NGC 6166:

- SN 2009eu (Type Ia, mag. 19.5) was discovered by Lick Observatory Supernova Search (LOSS) on 21 May 2009.
- PSN J16283836+3932552 (Type Ia-91bg, mag. 19.5) was discovered by R. Gagliano, D. Post, Jack Newton, and Tim Puckett on 15 May 2015.

== Image gallery ==
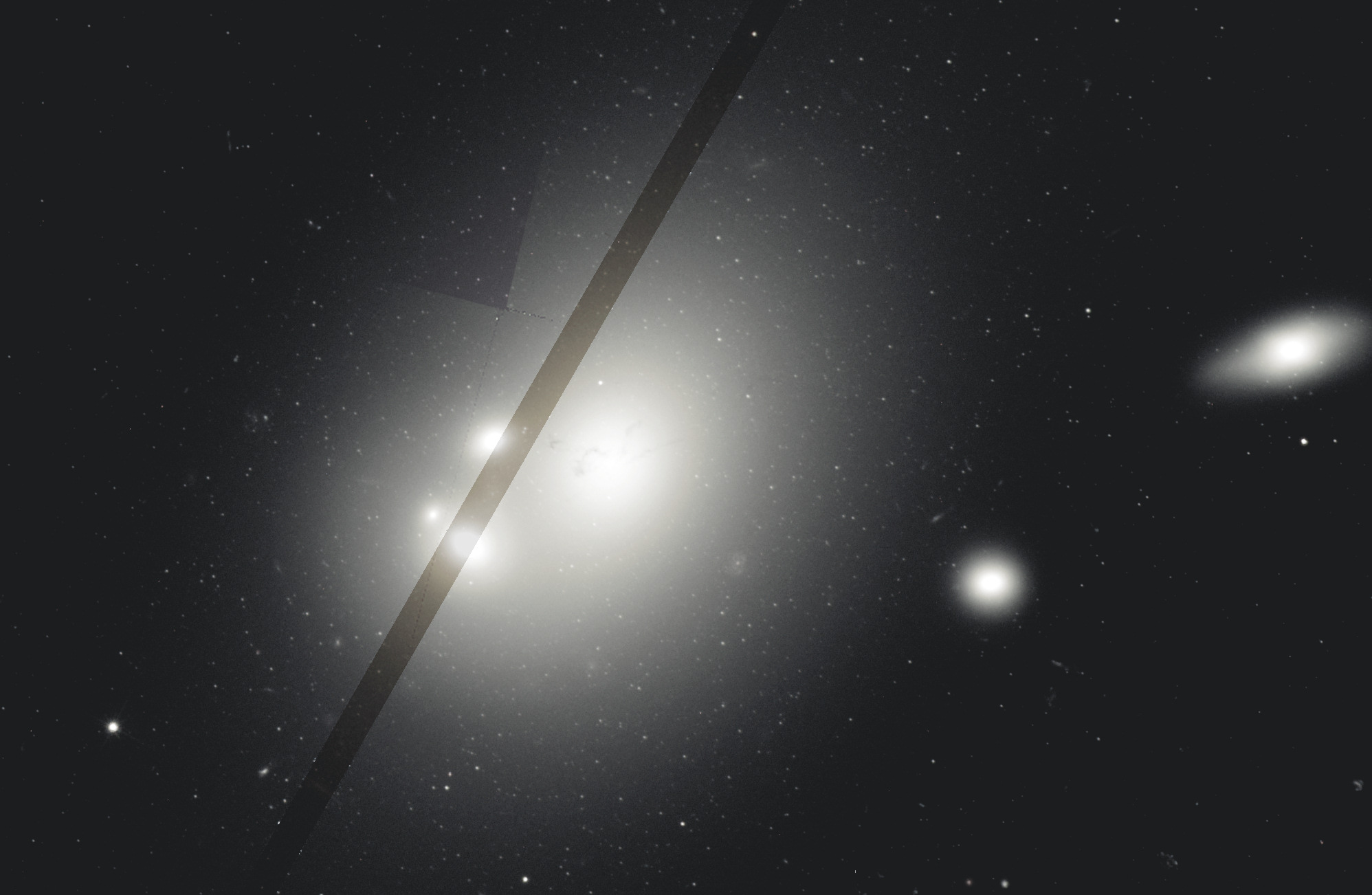
Close-up of galaxy NGC 6166, by HST (ACS, WFPC2).

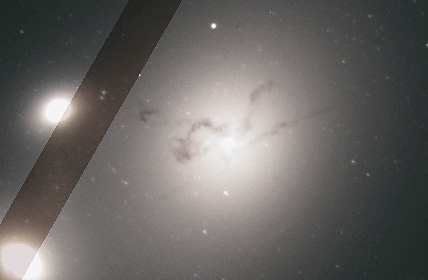
Dust lanes at Galaxy NGC 6166 core, by HST (ACS, WFPC2).

== See also ==
- List of galaxies
