= Abell 2199 =

Galaxy cluster in the constellation Hercules

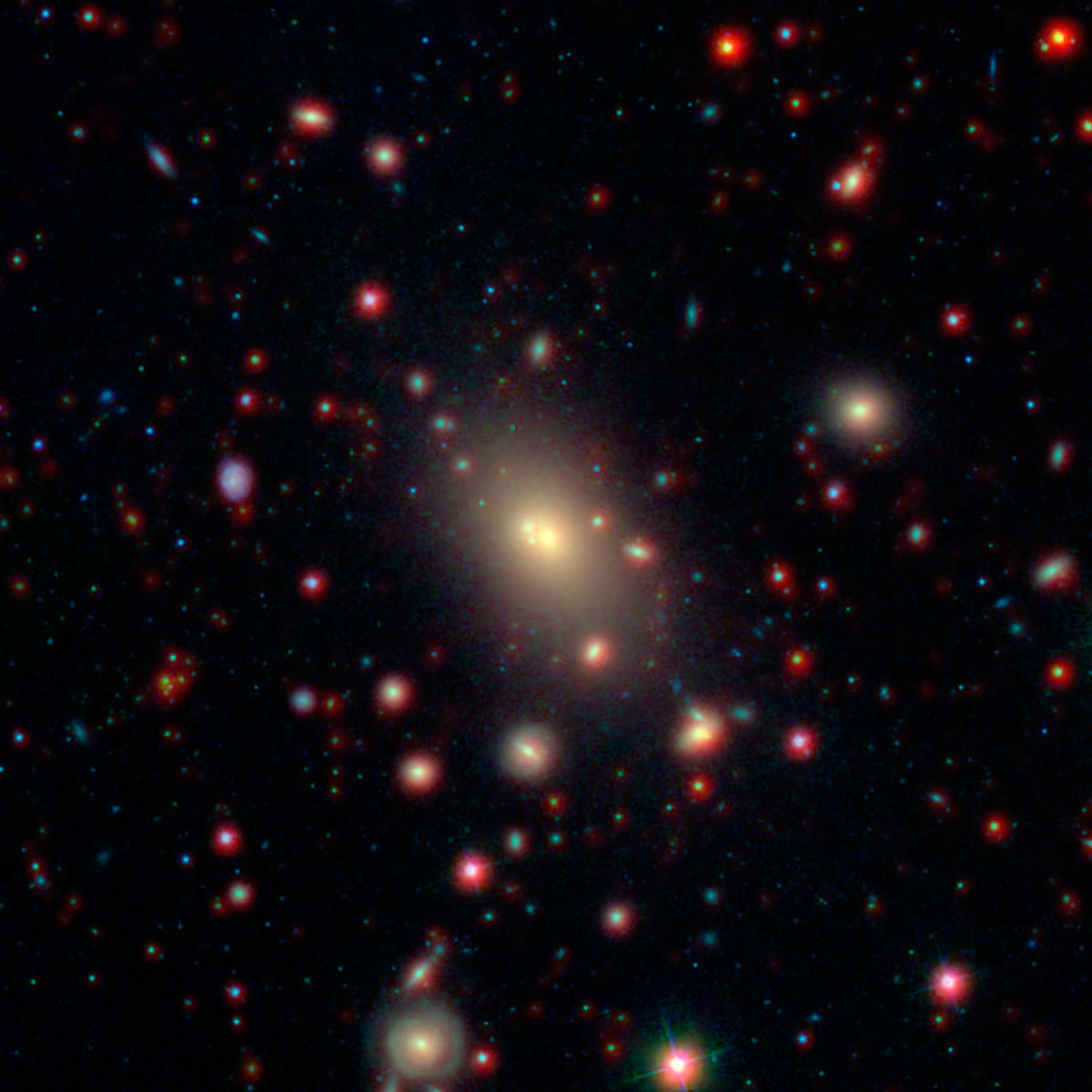

Observation data (Epoch J2000)
- Constellation: Hercules
- Right ascension: 16^{h} 28^{m} 38.5^{s}
- Declination: +39° 33′ 06″
- Brightest member: NGC 6166
- Number of galaxies: >290
- Richness class: 2
- Bautz–Morgan classification: I
- Redshift: 0.030151
- Distance: 128 Mpc (417 Mly) h^{−1}_{0.705}
- ICM temperature: 4.71 ± 0.13 keV
- Binding mass: 6.5×10^{14} h^{−1}_{0.70} M_{☉}
- X-ray flux: 10.64×10^{−11} erg s^{−1} cm^{−2} (0.1-2.4 keV)

Abell 2199 is a galaxy cluster in the Abell catalogue featuring the brightest cluster galaxy NGC 6166, a cD galaxy. Abell 2199 is the definition of a Bautz-Morgan type I cluster due to NGC 6166.

== See also ==
- Hercules (Chinese astronomy)
- List of Abell clusters
- List of largest galaxies
- List of nearest galaxies
- List of NGC objects (6001–7000)
- X-ray astronomy
