= NGC 6053 =

Galaxy in the constellation Hercules

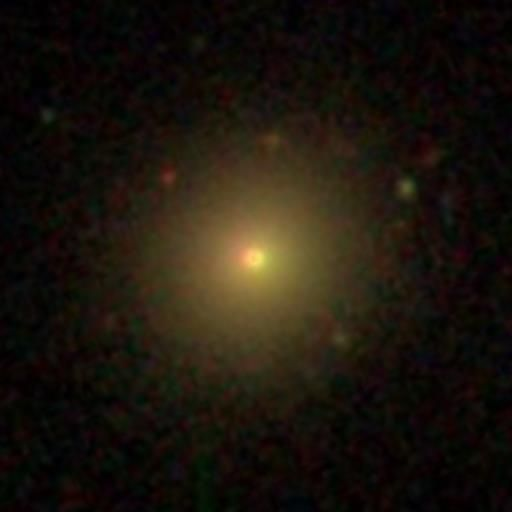
- SDSS image of NGC 6053.

Observation data (J2000 epoch)
- Constellation: Hercules
- Right ascension: 16^{h} 05^{m} 39.6^{s}
- Declination: 18° 09′ 52″
- Redshift: 0.035341
- Heliocentric radial velocity: 10595 km/s
- Distance: 137 Mpc (447 Mly)
- Group or cluster: Hercules Cluster
- Apparent magnitude (V): 15.3

Characteristics
- Type: E
- Size: ~95,000 ly (29 kpc) (estimated)
- Apparent size (V): 0.59 x 0.56

Other designations
- NGC 6057, CGCG 108-130, DRCG 34-120, MCG 3-41-106, NPM1G +18.0472, PGC 57090

NGC 6053 is an elliptical galaxy located about 450 million light-years away in the constellation Hercules. The galaxy was discovered by astronomer Lewis Swift on June 8, 1886 and is member of the Hercules Cluster.

== See also ==
- List of NGC objects (6001–7000)
