= NGC 6055 =

Barred lenticular galaxy in the constellation Hercules

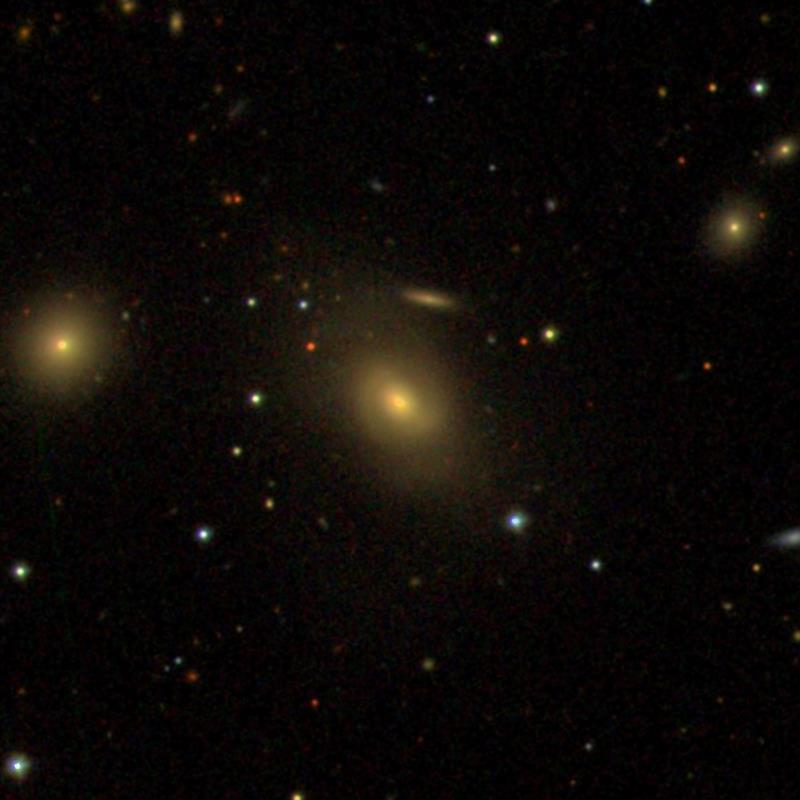
- SDSS image of NGC 6055.

Observation data (J2000 epoch)
- Constellation: Hercules
- Right ascension: 16^{h} 05^{m} 32.5^{s}
- Declination: 18° 09′ 34″
- Redshift: 0.037773
- Heliocentric radial velocity: 11324 km/s
- Distance: 137 Mpc (447 Mly)
- Group or cluster: Hercules Cluster
- Apparent magnitude (V): 14.7

Characteristics
- Type: (R)SAB0^+
- Size: ~160,000 ly (48 kpc) (estimated)
- Apparent size (V): 1.0 x 0.6

Other designations
- CGCG 108-123, MCG 3-41-101, PGC 57076, UGC 10191

NGC 6055 is a barred lenticular galaxy located about 450 million light-years away in the constellation Hercules. The galaxy was discovered by astronomer Lewis Swift on June 8, 1886. It also a member of the Hercules Cluster and is a LINER galaxy.

== See also ==
- List of NGC objects (6001–7000)
