= NGC 1334 =

Galaxy in the constellation Perseus

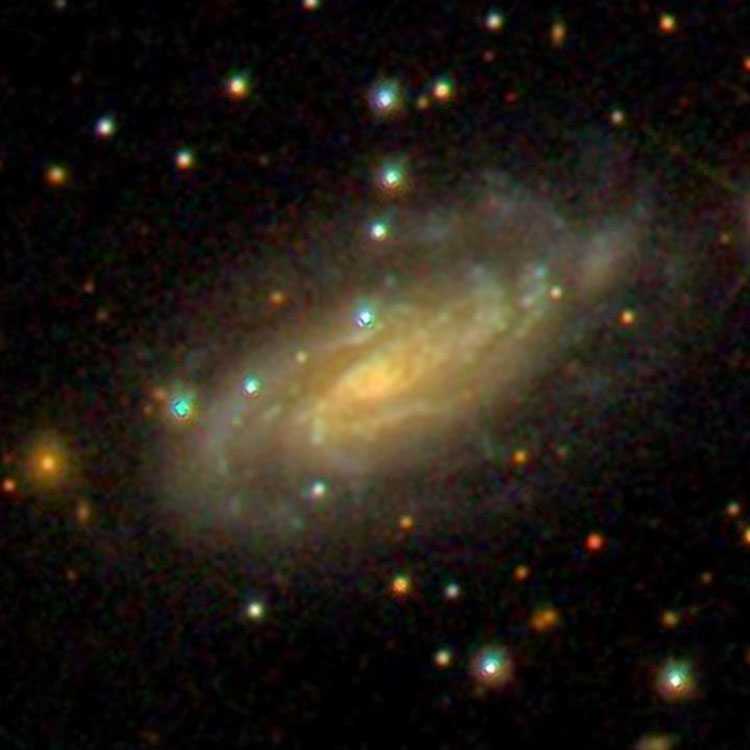
- SDSS image of NGC 1334

Observation data (J2000 epoch)
- Constellation: Perseus
- Right ascension: 03^{h} 30^{m} 01.8^{s}
- Declination: 41° 49′ 55″
- Redshift: 0.014257
- Heliocentric radial velocity: 4274 km/s
- Distance: 184 Mly (56.4 Mpc)
- Group or cluster: Perseus Cluster
- Apparent magnitude (V): 14.1

Characteristics
- Type: Sbc pec
- Size: ~82,000 ly (25 kpc) (estimated)
- Apparent size (V): 1.5 x 0.7

Other designations
- UGC 2759, MCG +07-08-018, PGC 13001, CGCG 541-017

NGC 1334 is a spiral galaxy located about 185 million light-years away in the constellation Perseus. It was discovered by astronomer Heinrich d'Arrest on February 14, 1863. NGC 1334 is a member of the Perseus Cluster and is a starburst galaxy. It also appears to have a complex distorted structure.

== See also ==
- List of NGC objects (1001–2000)
- NGC 6045
