= NGC 6040 =

Galaxy in the constellation Hercules

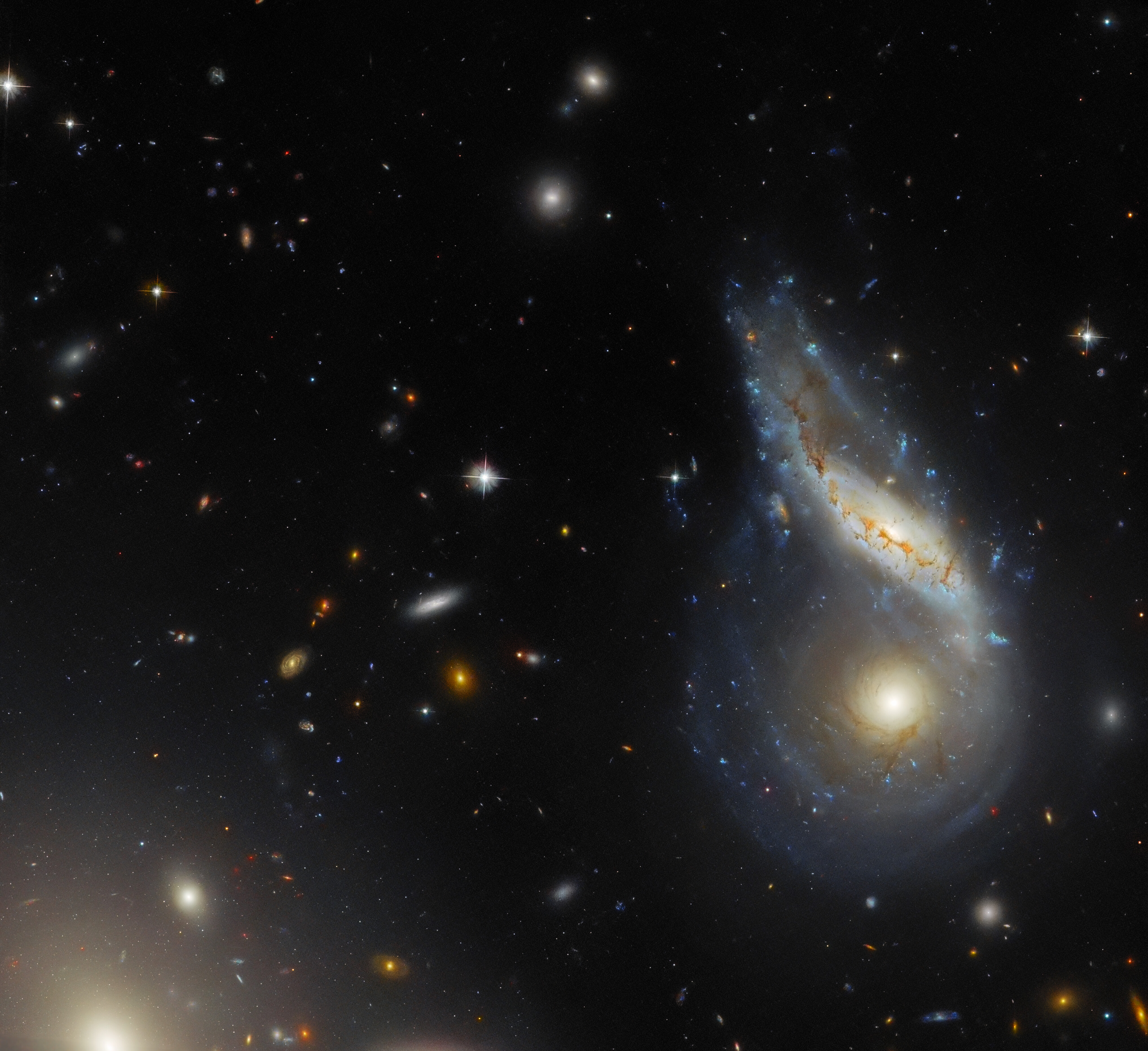
- NGC 6040 imaged by the Hubble Space Telescope

Observation data (J2000 epoch)
- Constellation: Hercules
- Right ascension: 16^{h} 04^{m} 26.7^{s}
- Declination: 17° 45′ 01″
- Redshift: 0.042079
- Heliocentric radial velocity: 12615 km/s
- Distance: 173 Mpc (564 Mly)
- Group or cluster: Hercules Cluster
- Apparent magnitude (V): 15.07

Characteristics
- Type: SAB(s)c
- Mass: ~2.1×10^{11} M_{☉}
- Size: ~356,300 ly (109.23 kpc) (estimated)
- Apparent size (V): 1.3 x 0.5
- Notable features: Forms an interacting pair with PGC 56942

Other designations
- NGC 6040A, Arp 122 NED02, UGC 10165, PGC 56932, VV 212a

NGC 6040 is a spiral galaxy located about 550 million light-years away in the constellation Hercules. NGC 6040 was discovered by astronomer Édouard Stephan on June 27, 1870. NGC 6040 is interacting with the lenticular galaxy PGC 56942. As a result of this interaction, NGC 6040's southern spiral arm has been warped in the direction toward PGC 56942. NGC 6040 and PGC 56942 are both members of the Hercules Cluster.

NGC 6040 was classified in the 1966 Atlas of Peculiar Galaxies by Halton Arp, who listed it as Arp 122. However, Mr. Arp mistakenly identified NGC 6040 as NGC 6039, which is not part of any Arp object.

== Neutral hydrogen depletion ==
NGC 6040 and PGC 56942 are both depleted of their neutral hydrogen content. This depletion may have been caused as both galaxies fell into the Hercules Cluster and interacted with the surrounding intracluster medium (ICM). This interaction would have caused ram-pressure stripping and in effect removed the gas in the two galaxies.

== See also ==
- List of NGC objects (6001–7000)
- Arp 120
- Arp 272
