= IC 1182 =

Galaxy in the constellation Hercules

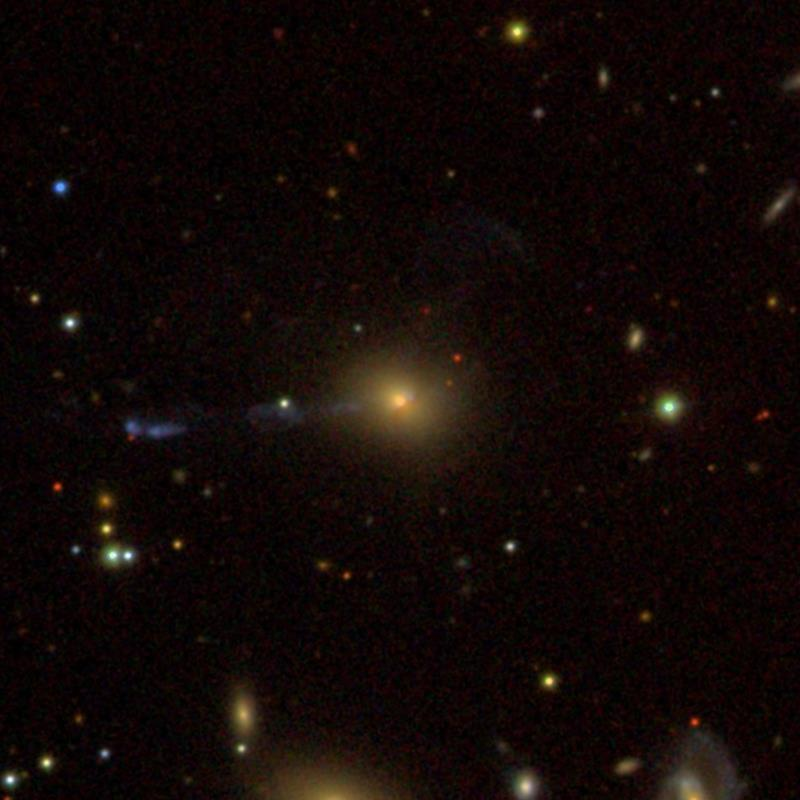
- SDSS image of IC 1182

Observation data (J2000 epoch)
- Constellation: Hercules
- Right ascension: 16^{h} 05^{m} 36.8^{s}
- Declination: +17° 48′ 07.7″
- Redshift: 0.034210
- Heliocentric radial velocity: 10,206 km/s
- Distance: 464 Mly (142.26 Mpc)
- Group or cluster: Hercules Cluster
- Apparent magnitude (V): 15.19

Characteristics
- Type: SAO+ pec, HII
- Size: 135,000 ly

Other designations
- PGC 57084, UGC 10192, CGCG 108-126, MCG +03-41-104, Mrk 298, AGC 260184, NPM1G+17.0584, 2MASX J16053680+1748078, NVSS J160536+174804, 1RXS J160537.9+174740, KUG 1603+179B, SDSS J160536.78+174807.5, WBL 607-016, 2MASS J16053680+1748075, LEDA 57084

IC 1182 is a type S0-a lenticular galaxy located in Hercules. It is located 464 million light-years away from the Solar System and was discovered on August 11, 1892, by Stephane Javelle. IC 1198 is a member of the Hercules Cluster, which is a part of the CfA 2 Great Wall.

== Description ==
IC 1182 was originally classified as a Seyfert type 2 galaxy but later, research shows it is an unusual and rare galaxy in some kind of merger event. A jet which is extending out from the center in an easterly direction is composed of kinetic material. There is a broad, faint S-shaped plume and debris on the other side of the galaxy. IC 1182 radiates a lot of energy and ejects a substantial amount of material at high velocity. In its central region, clusters of O-type hot blue stars are present.

== An ongoing merger? ==
IC 1182 shows high resolution broad and narrow band images and long slit spectroscopy. It reveals a distorted morphology with a heavily obscured disk-link structure with several knots in its regions. Some of the galactic material, in the form of two slender tails are detected beyond the main body of the galaxy. IC 1182 has color indices of an early type object which is significantly bluer than what is typical for this kind of galaxy. The narrow lines show this galaxy is a powerful emitter and the knots in the central region and inside the tail emerging eastward from the galaxy are luminous in Hα and have typical sizes of 1 kpc.

Additionally, IC 1182 contains large quantities of neural hydrogen which its distance-independent ratio of hydrogen mass to optical luminosity is equal to 0.7 times the solar ratio. This could indicate it might be involved in a collision involving a gas-rich spiral galaxy which gives rise to observed nuclear emission lines.
