= NGC 7035 and NGC 7035A =

Pair of interacting galaxies in the constellation Capricornus

NGC 7035/NGC 7035A
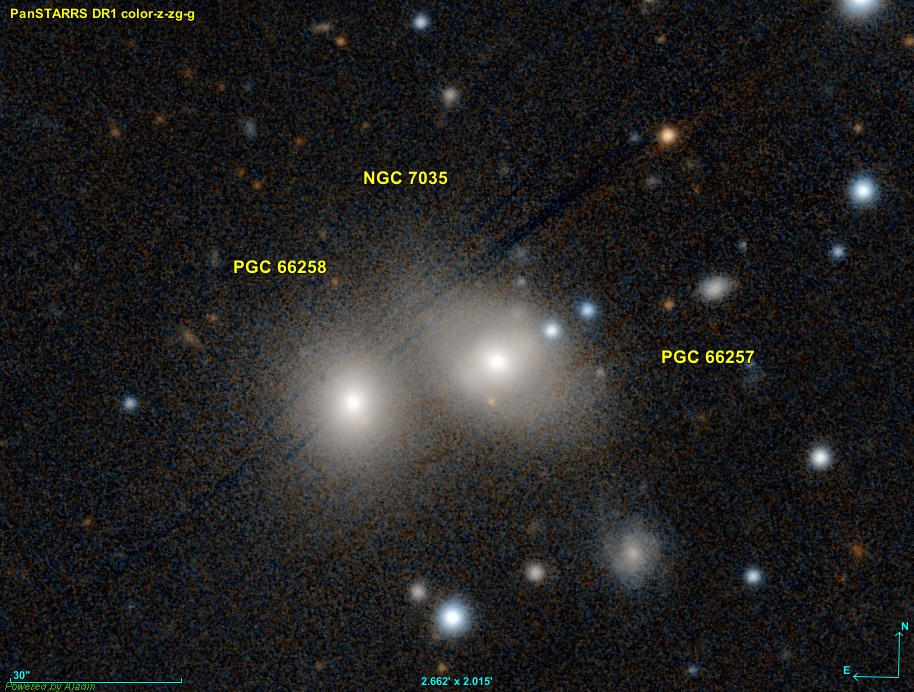
- Pan-STARRS image of NGC 7035 (left-center) and NGC 7035A.

Observation data (J2000 epoch)
- Constellation: Capricornus
- Right ascension: 21^{h} 10^{m} 46.4^{s} / 21^{h} 10^{m} 45.4^{s}
- Declination: −23° 08′ 09″ / −23° 08′ 07″
- Redshift: 0.030981
- Heliocentric radial velocity: 9,288 km/s
- Distance: 427/401.2 Mly
- Apparent magnitude (V): 14.57/15.41

Characteristics
- Type: S0's
- Apparent size (V): 1.0 x 0.7/1.22 x 0.50

Other designations
- ESO 530-15, PGC 66258/ESO 530-15A, PGC 66257

NGC 7035 and NGC 7035A are a pair of interacting lenticular galaxies located around 400 to 430 million light-years away in the constellation of Capricornus. The main galaxy, NGC 7035 was discovered by astronomer Frank Muller in 1886.

== See also ==
- Arp 272 – A pair of interacting spiral galaxies
- List of NGC objects (7001–7840)
