= NGC 6054 =

Galaxy in the constellation Hercules

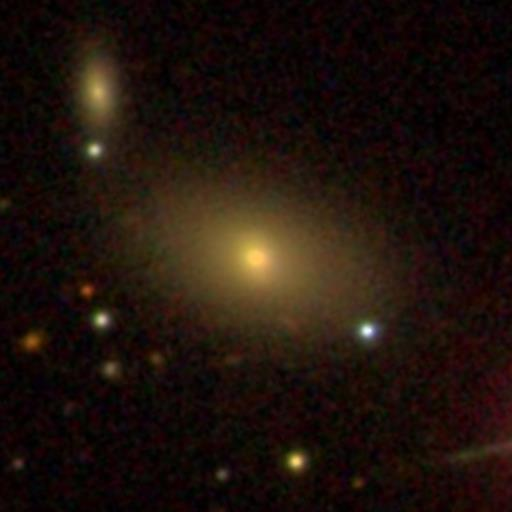
- SDSS image of NGC 6054.

Observation data (J2000 epoch)
- Constellation: Hercules
- Right ascension: 16^{h} 05^{m} 38.1^{s}
- Declination: 17° 46′ 04″
- Redshift: 0.034010
- Heliocentric radial velocity: 10196 km/s
- Distance: 140 Mpc (457 Mly)
- Group or cluster: Hercules Cluster
- Apparent magnitude (V): 15.1

Characteristics
- Type: SAB0^-
- Size: ~129,000 ly (39.4 kpc) (estimated)
- Apparent size (V): 0.86 x 0.47

Other designations
- IC 1183, CGCG 108-128, UGC 10192, MCG 3-41-103, PGC 57086

NGC 6054 is a barred lenticular galaxy located about 460 million light-years away in the constellation Hercules. It was discovered by astronomer Lewis Swift on June 27, 1886. It was then rediscovered by astronomer Guillaume Bigourdan on June 1, 1888. PGC 57073 is often misidentified as NGC 6054. NGC 6054 is a member of the Hercules Cluster.

== See also ==
- List of NGC objects (6001–7000)
