= MRC 2011−298 =

Brightest cluster galaxy in the constellation Sagittarius

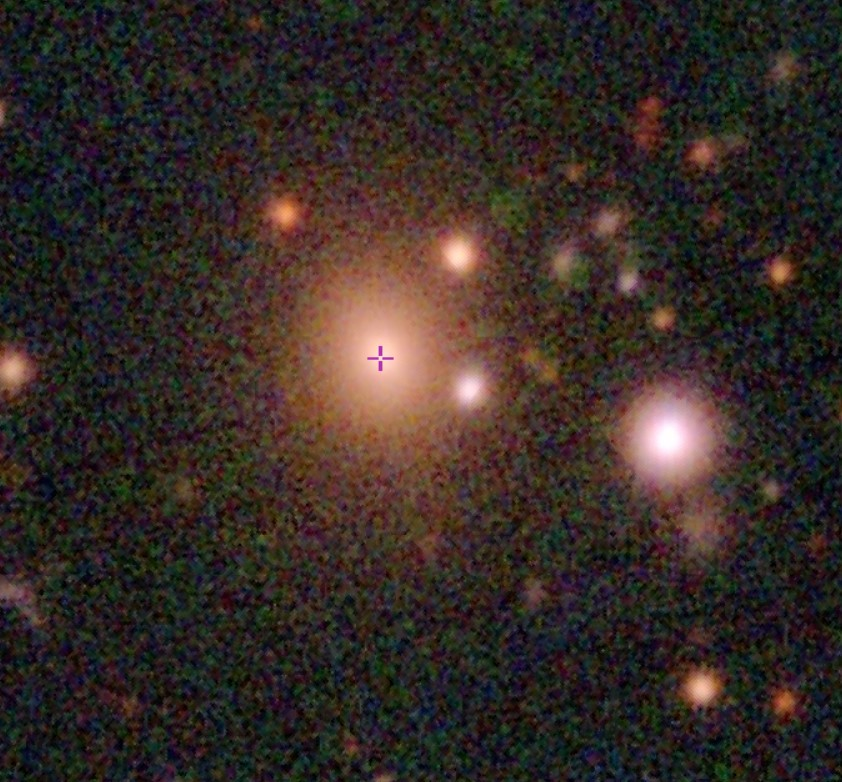
- MRC 2011−298 taken by Pan-STARRS

Observation data (J2000.0 epoch)
- Constellation: Sagittarius
- Right ascension: 20^{h} 14^{m} 18.86^{s}
- Declination: −29° 42′ 36.02″
- Redshift: 0.136620
- Heliocentric radial velocity: 40,958 km/s
- Distance: 2.115 Gly (648.5 Mpc)
- Group or cluster: Abell 3670
- Apparent magnitude (V): 0.229
- Apparent magnitude (B): 0.303

Characteristics
- Type: E
- Notable features: Radio galaxy

Other designations
- PMN J2014−2942, PGC 726073, NVSS J201418−294234, TXS 2011−298, 2MASX J20141866−2942364

MRC 2011−298 is an elliptical galaxy with an active galactic nucleus, located in the constellation of Sagittarius. It is located 2.1 billion light-years away from Earth. MRC 2011−298 is the brightest cluster galaxy in the galaxy cluster, Abell 3670 and classified as a dumbbell galaxy, an optical system with two galactic nuclei separated by 7″, corresponding to ≃17 kpc according to the adopted cosmology, with similar magnitude and a common stellar halo. The galaxy is known to have an ellipticity of ε = 0.28 and a position angle of PA = 24° that is measured from north to east.

== Characteristics ==
MRC 2011−298 lies in the rich galaxy cluster which is located at redshift z = 0.142 . The cluster has an angular scale of 1″ = 2.4 kpc, and with a luminosity distance of D_{L} = 645 Mpc.

MRC 2011−298 has a peculiar shape which its radio source was observed at 5.5 GHz using the Very Large Array (VLA). Instead of being classified as either a FRI and FRII radio galaxy, the galaxy belongs to a class of X-shaped radio galaxies; it exhibits a pair of bright lobes in north to south direction with a pair of weak wings in the east going from east to west direction. These wings are oriented with an angle of about 90°, thus giving the structure its cross-like shape. Like other X-shaped radio galaxies, MRC 2011−298 has primary lobes with jets containing hotspots, but the wings does not hosts jets.

The flux density of the radio lobes in MRC 2011−298 is S_{lobes} = 294 ± 15 mJy, with east and the west wings have a flux density of S_{Ew} = 32 ± 2 mJy and S_{Ww} = 23 ± 1 mJy, respectively. The total length of the lobes is found to be l_{lobes} ≃ 60″ ≃ 145 kpc, whereas the wings is l_{Ew} ≃ 75″ ≃ 180 kpc and l_{Ww} ≃ 60″ ≃ 145 kpc wide. Its ratio between the projected lengths of the wings and lobes of MRC 2011−298 is 2.8.

Thanks to researchers, the radio jets in MRC 2011−298 are found to be characterized by a curvature and an S-shaped structure. But no hotspots are present. Further observations suggests the wings are very faint (S < 5 mJy). The eastern one appears as diffuse emission, while the western wing is better defined. As for the north and south jets, the flux density is confirmed to S_{Sj} = 17 ± 1 mJy and S_{Nj} = 11.1 ± 0.3 mJy, respectively, with similar lengths of l_{Sj} ≃ l_{Nj} ≃ 18″ ≃ 40 kpc, suggesting MRC 2011−298 to be an FRI-type XRG measured by 1.4 GHz of P_{1.4} = (1.7 ± 0.1) × 10^{25} W Hz^{−1}. The radio power of the galaxy is consistent with the radio power of typical XRGs, intermediate between that of FRIs and FRIIs.

== Hydrodynamical model ==
It is suggested the jets in MRC 2011−298 are aligned with the major axis of a high ellipticity galaxy. This causes stronger environment gas pressure along the major axis with respect to the minor axis. The backflow plasma originating from the hotspots in MRC 2011−298 is found to redirect towards the minor axis, where the minimum resistance of the gas allows the formation of the wings.

In the buoyant backflow model, the wings plasma of MRC 2011−298 are led by the buoyancy force which evolves at subsonic speeds. In this variant of this model, strong backflows forms an over-pressured cocoon, with respect to the surrounding gas. This ejects plasma outflows at supersonic speed along the steepest pressure gradient (i.e. the minor axis), to produce more extended wings. From three-dimensions numerical simulations, this suggests a supersonic origin and a subsonic evolution of the wings inside the galaxy.

== Galaxy merger ==
Further observations found MRC 2011−298 contains gas present inside a stellar shell deflecting the radio jets and causing the wings to be formed. Such evidence found, suggests MRC 2011−298 might have gone a galaxy merger with a disk galaxy triggering its active black hole and a system of stellar shells. These stellar shells are form of rotating arc-shaped structures roughly found in ~10% of local elliptical galaxies, that are aligned with their optical major axis. Looking through jet interaction in Centaurus A and the stellar shells, finds a similar phenomenon in X-shaped radio galaxies where they contain traces of neutral and molecular hydrogen with an estimated mass of M_{H} ≃ 4 × 10^{7} M_{☉} and average density of n_{H} ≃ 4 × 10^{−2} cm^{−3}.

MRC 2011−298 is known to have a high supermassive black hole mass, which is responsible for reorienting the jets making primary lobes evolve along the new direction, with its wings as fossil emissions from previous jets. This phenomenon is caused after the coalescence with another supermassive black hole or during the interaction between a binary black hole or unstable regions of its accretion disk.

From traces of stellar shells and high black hole mass, this indicates MRC 2011−298 is the end product caused by several galaxy mergers, hence sharing common characteristics of dominant cluster galaxies.
