= NGC 6044 =

Galaxy in the constellation Hercules

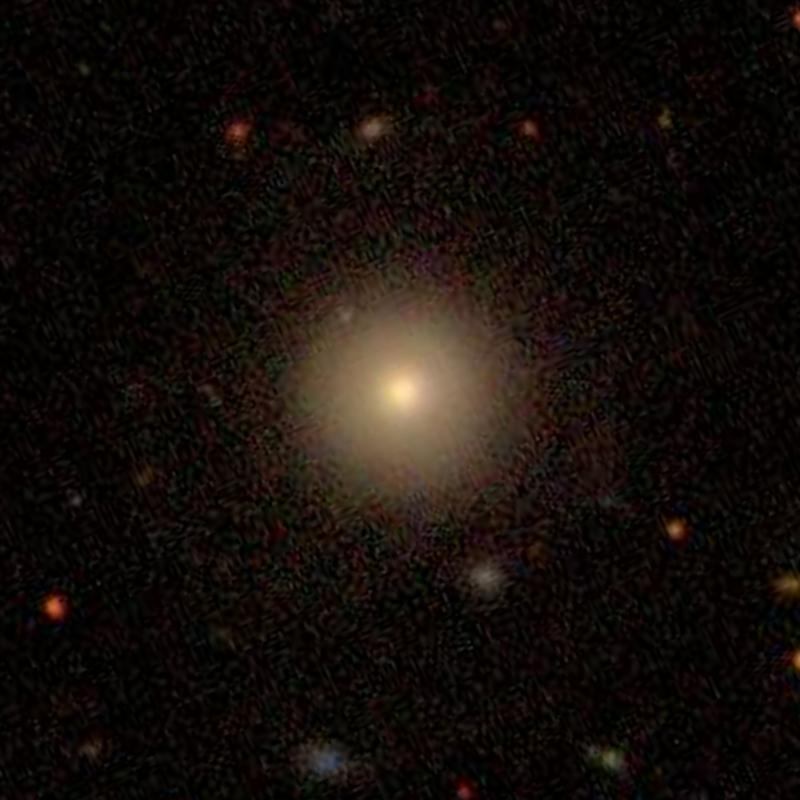
- SDSS image of NGC 6044.

Observation data (J2000 epoch)
- Constellation: Hercules
- Right ascension: 16^{h} 04^{m} 59.7^{s}
- Declination: 17° 52′ 13″
- Redshift: 0.033106
- Heliocentric radial velocity: 9925 km/s
- Distance: 143 Mpc (466 Mly)
- Group or cluster: Hercules Cluster
- Apparent magnitude (V): 14.9

Characteristics
- Type: SA0^0
- Size: ~100,100 ly (30.69 kpc) (estimated)
- Apparent size (V): 0.62 x 0.58

Other designations
- IC 1172, CGCG 108-110, DRCG 34-93, MCG 3-41-84, PGC 57015

NGC 6044 is a lenticular galaxy located about 465 million light-years away in the constellation Hercules. NGC 6044 was discovered by astronomer Lewis Swift on June 27, 1886. It was then rediscovered by astronomer Guillaume Bigourdan on June 8, 1888. NGC 6044 is a member of the Hercules Cluster.

== See also ==
- List of NGC objects (6001–7000)
- NGC 6039
