= NGC 6047 =

Galaxy in the constellation Hercules

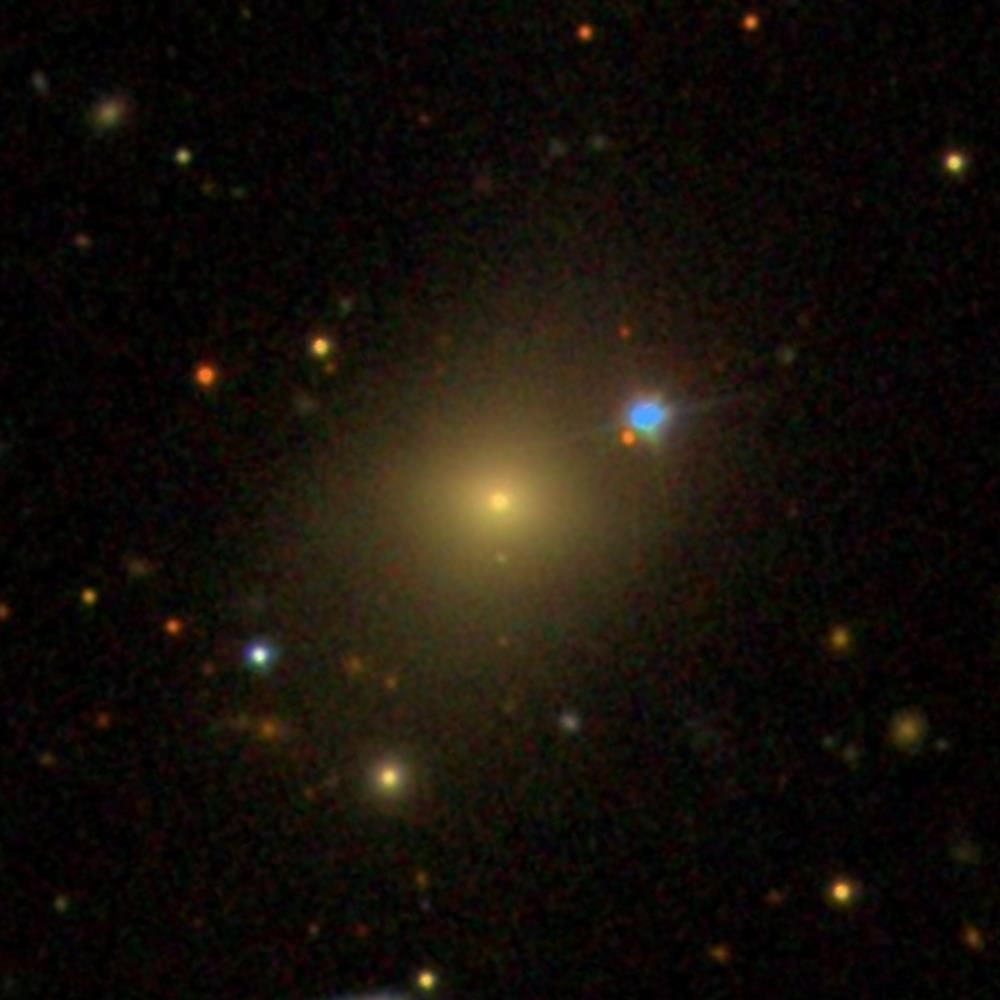
- SDSS image of NGC 6047.

Observation data (J2000 epoch)
- Constellation: Hercules
- Right ascension: 16^{h} 05^{m} 09.0^{s}
- Declination: 17° 43′ 48″
- Redshift: 0.031262
- Heliocentric radial velocity: 9,372 km/s
- Distance: 131.4 Mpc (429 Mly)
- Group or cluster: Hercules Cluster
- Apparent magnitude (V): 14.55

Characteristics
- Type: E+, cD
- Size: ~170 kly (52 kpc) (estimated)
- Apparent size (V): 1′.1 x 0′.8
- Notable features: radio jet

Other designations
- CGCG 108-111, DRCG 34-62, 4C +17.66, PKS 1602+178, MCG +3-41-87, PGC 57033

NGC 6047 is an elliptical galaxy located about 430 million light-years away in the constellation Hercules. It was discovered by astronomer Lewis Swift on June 27, 1886. NGC 6047 is a member of the Hercules Cluster.

NGC 6047 has a peculiar morphology which suggests it has undergone a recent merger. It may be interacting with NGC 6045 which lies around ~320,000 ly (97 kpc) away. NGC 6047 has two radio jets and is classified as a FR I radio galaxy. The jets appear to have a Z-shaped structure.

== See also ==
- NGC 1128
