= NGC 326 =

Radio galaxy in the constellation Pisces

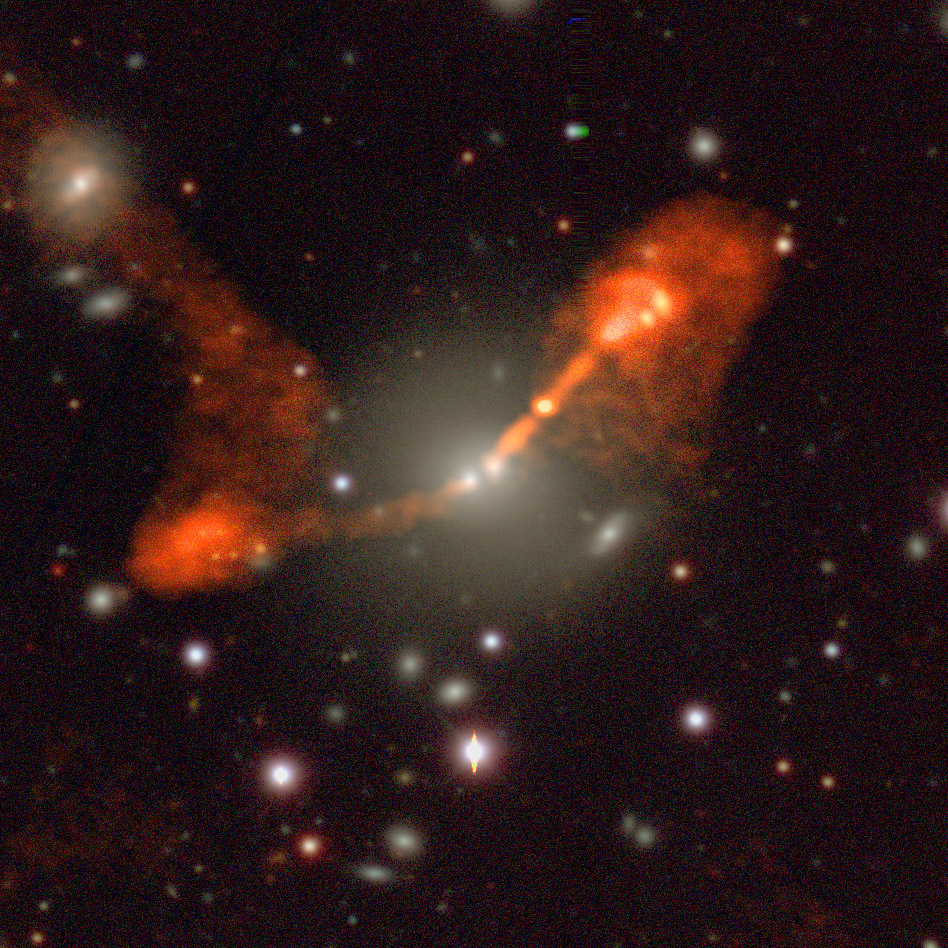
- NGC 326 with DECam and with the Very Large Array radio sky survey called VLASS (orange part)

Observation data (J2000 epoch)
- Constellation: Pisces
- Right ascension: 00^{h} 58^{m} 22.7^{s}
- Declination: +26° 51′ 55″
- Redshift: 0.047400
- Heliocentric radial velocity: 14,210 km/s
- Apparent magnitude (V): 14.33

Characteristics
- Type: E
- Apparent size (V): 1.4' × 1.4'

Other designations
- UGC 00601, CGCG 480-026, MCG +04-03-025, 4C +26.03, B2 0055+26, PGC 3482, PKS B0055+265, TXS 0055+265.

NGC 326 is a dumbbell galaxy in the constellation Pisces. It was discovered on August 24, 1865 by Heinrich d'Arrest. It was described by Dreyer as "faint, a little extended, 9th or 10th magnitude star to southeast."

== Background ==
X-shaped (or "winged") radio galaxies are a class of extragalactic radio source that exhibit two, low-surface-brightness radio lobes (the "wings") oriented at an angle to the active, or high-surface-brightness, lobes. Both sets of lobes pass symmetrically through the center of the elliptical galaxy that is the source of the lobes, giving the radio galaxy an X-shaped morphology as seen on radio maps.

== Study of the galaxy ==
NGC 326 is a radio galaxy; in fact, it is one of the most prominent X-shaped galaxies ever observed. Several studies have been conducted to try to explain its morphology through either fluid motion or reorientation of the jet axis. The Chandra X-ray Observatory examined the emissions of the galaxy. The study revealed several features, including a high-temperature front that might indicate a shock, high-temperate knots around the rim of the radio emission, and a cavity associated with the eastern wing.
