= NGC 6045 =

Galaxy in the constellation Hercules

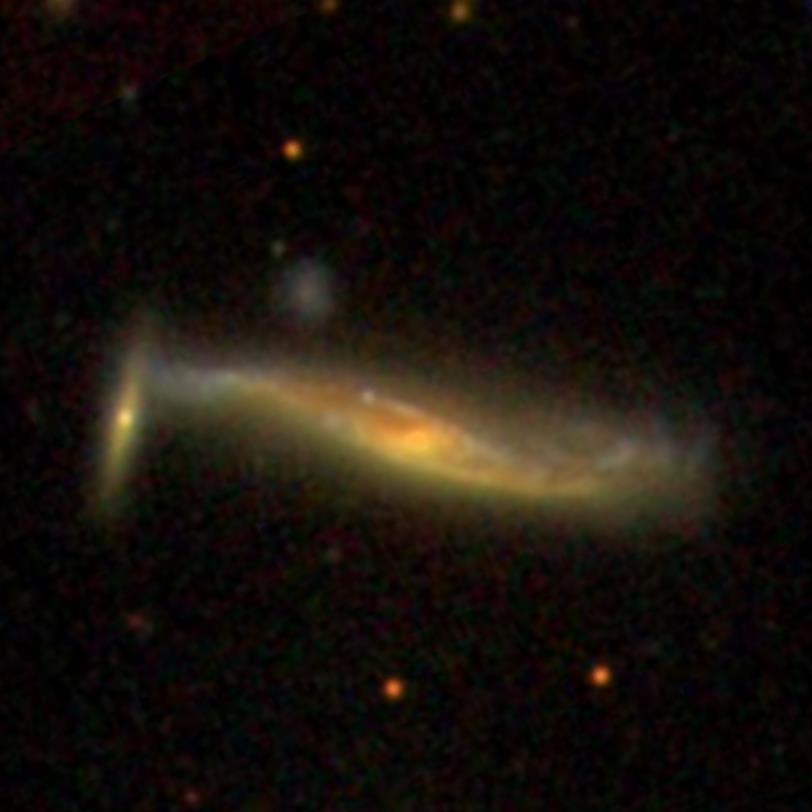
- Sloan Digital Sky Survey image of NGC 6045. The small, nearby galaxy at left portion of the image is PGC 84720.

Observation data (J2000 epoch)
- Constellation: Hercules
- Right ascension: 16^{h} 05^{m} 07.9^{s}
- Declination: 17° 45′ 28″
- Redshift: 0.033310
- Heliocentric radial velocity: 9986 km/s
- Distance: 137 Mpc (447 Mly)
- Group or cluster: Hercules Cluster
- Apparent magnitude (V): 14.9

Characteristics
- Type: SB(s)c
- Size: ~183,300 ly (56.20 kpc) (estimated)
- Apparent size (V): 1.17 x 0.28
- Notable features: Warped disk

Other designations
- PGC 057031, UGC 10177, Arp 71, MCG +03-41-088

NGC 6045 is a barred spiral galaxy located about 450 million light-years away in the constellation Hercules. NGC 6045 was discovered by astronomer Lewis Swift on June 27, 1886 and is a member of the Hercules Cluster. It is also a LINER galaxy.

== Possible interaction ==
NGC 6045 is very luminous in both X-ray and infrared light. This high luminosity in both X-ray and infrared has been suggested to be the result of a starburst event in the galaxy. It is thought that starburst events are caused by interactions or mergers with other galaxies. Also, NGC 6045 has a warped disk which may be due to an interaction with the elliptical galaxy NGC 6047 which lies around ~320,000 ly (97 kpc) from the galaxy.

== See also ==
- List of NGC objects (6001–7000)
- Hercules Supercluster
- Arp 272
