= NGC 6041 =

Galaxy in the constellation Hercules

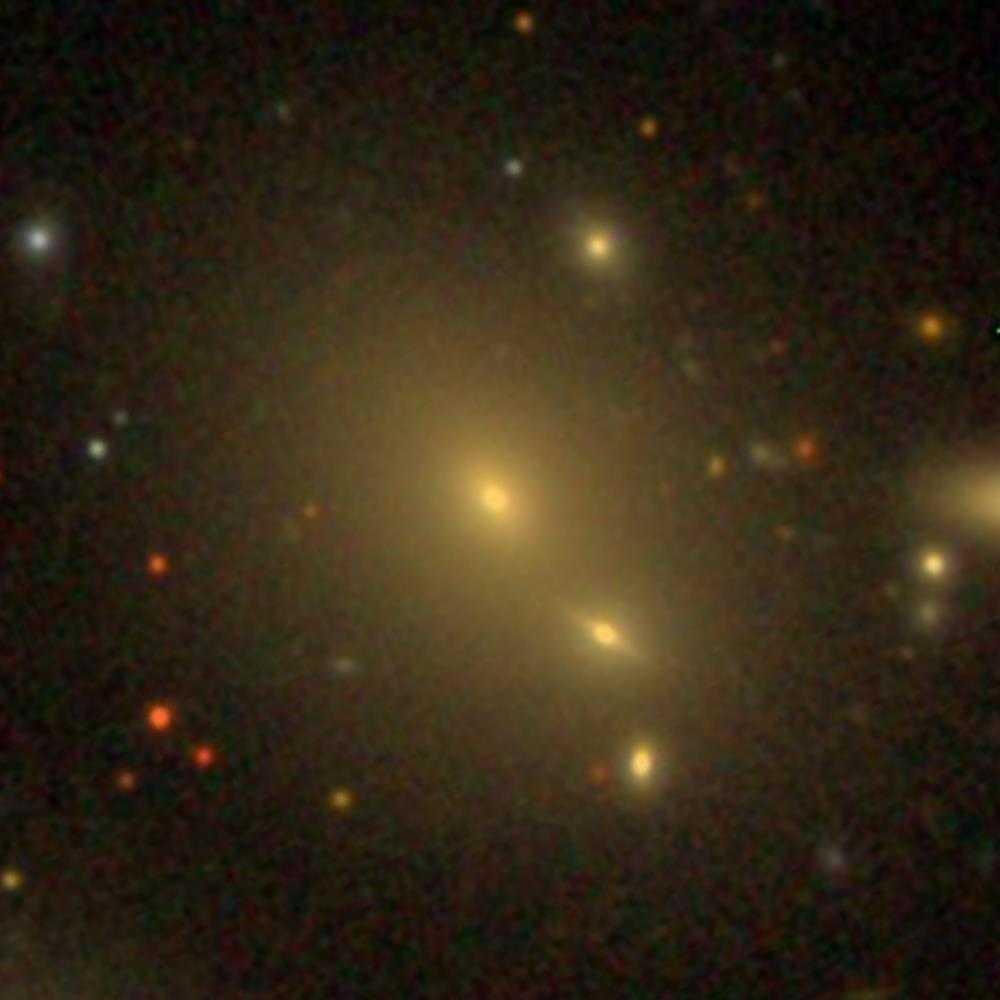
- Sloan Digital Sky Survey image of the giant elliptical galaxy NGC 6041.

Observation data (J2000 epoch)
- Constellation: Hercules
- Right ascension: 16^{h} 04^{m} 35.8^{s}
- Declination: +17° 43′ 18″
- Redshift: 0.035151
- Heliocentric radial velocity: 10538 km/s
- Distance: 145 Mpc (473 Mly)
- Group or cluster: Hercules Cluster
- Apparent magnitude (V): 14.5

Characteristics
- Type: E+2
- Size: ~217,300 ly (66.63 kpc) (estimated)
- Apparent size (V): 1.13 x 0.82

Other designations
- UGC 10170, MCG +03-41-078, PGC 56962, VV 213

NGC 6041 is a giant elliptical galaxy located about 470 million light-years away in the constellation Hercules. NGC 6041 has an extended envelope that is distorted towards the galaxy pair Arp 122. NGC 6041 is the brightest galaxy (BCG) in the Hercules Cluster. The galaxy was discovered by astronomer Édouard Stephan on June 27, 1870.

== See also ==
- List of NGC objects (6001–7000)
- Messier 87
- NGC 1399
- NGC 4874
- NGC 4889
