= 3C 75 =

Black hole system in the constellation Cetus

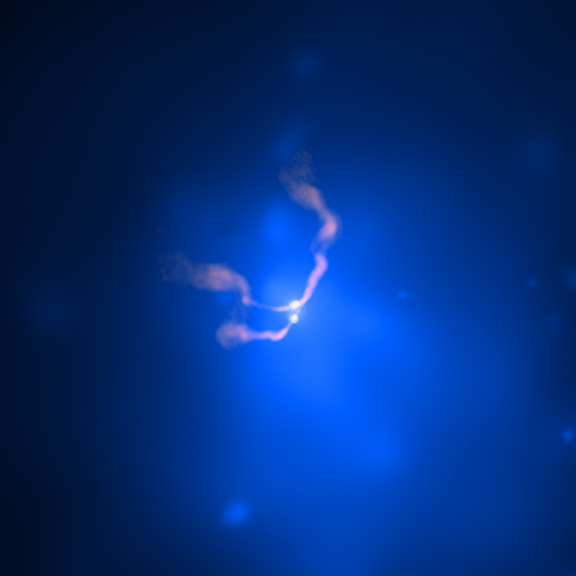
- Image in radio (pink) and x-ray (cyan) of 3C 75.

Observation data (J2000 epoch)
- Constellation: Cetus
- Right ascension: 02^{h} 57^{m} 42.63^{s}
- Declination: +06° 01′ 04.8″
- Redshift: 0.0231
- Distance: 296 Mly
- Apparent magnitude (V): +13.93

Characteristics
- Type: Active binary
- Apparent size (V): 0.741″ × 0.489″

Other designations
- MCG+01-08-027, NGC 1128

3C 75 (also called 3C75) is a binary black hole system in the dumbbell-shaped galaxy NGC 1128 in the galaxy cluster Abell 400. It has four relativistic jets, two coming from each accreting supermassive black hole. It is travelling at 1200 kilometers per second, causing the jets to be swept back. 3C 75 may be X-ray source 2A 0252+060 (1H 0253+058, XRS 02522+060).
