= NGC 6043 =

Lenticular galaxy in the constellation Hercules

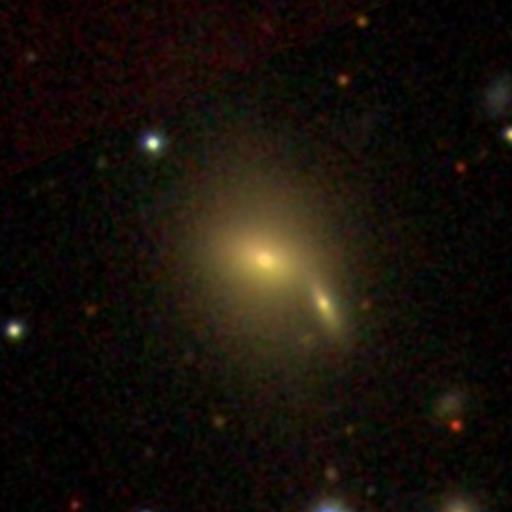
- SDSS image of NGC 6043. The small galaxy at the lower right portion of NGC 6043 is PGC 1541265.

Observation data (J2000 epoch)
- Constellation: Hercules
- Right ascension: 16^{h} 05^{m} 01.4^{s}
- Declination: 17° 46′ 32″
- Redshift: 0.033039
- Heliocentric radial velocity: 9905 km/s
- Distance: 136 Mpc (444 Mly)
- Group or cluster: Hercules Cluster
- Apparent magnitude (V): 15.2

Characteristics
- Type: SAB0^-
- Size: ~107,000 ly (32.82 kpc) (estimated)
- Apparent size (V): 0.66 x 0.51

Other designations
- PGC 57019, MCG 3-41-86

NGC 6043 is a lenticular galaxy located about 444 million light-years away in the constellation Hercules. NGC 6043 was discovered by astronomer Lewis Swift on June 27, 1886. The galaxy is a member of the Hercules Cluster.

== See also ==
- List of NGC objects (6001–7000)
