= Dumbbell Galaxy =

Dumbbell Galaxy is a name given to galaxies with a double appearance. Examples are:

- NGC 326
- NGC 1128 in Abell 400
- NGC 3862
- MRC 0344-291 in Abell 3165
- VV 162
