= NGC 6039 =

Galaxy in the constellation Hercules

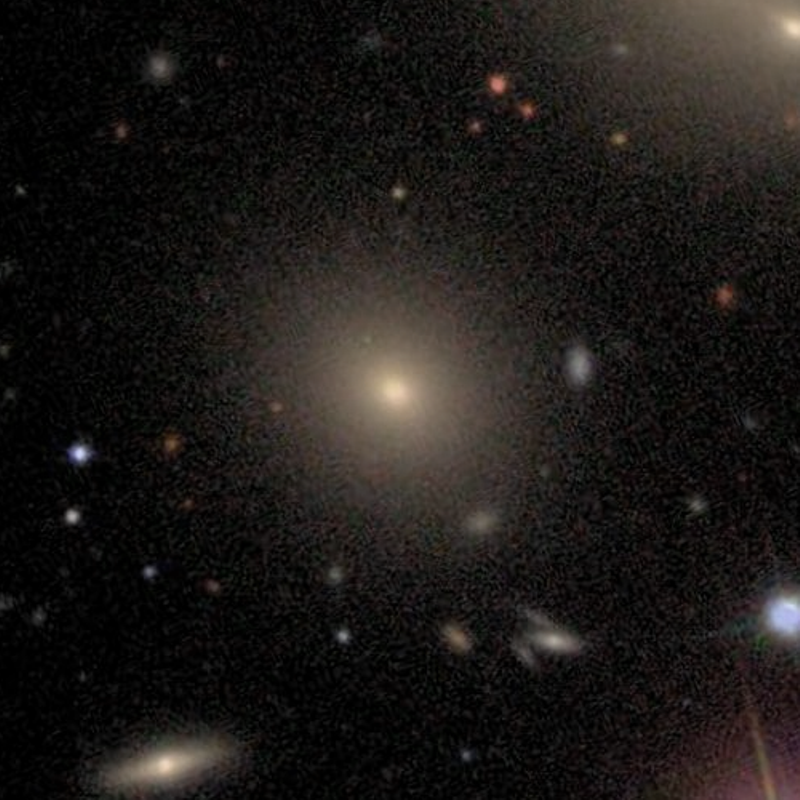
- SDSS image of the giant galaxy NGC 6039. The halo of NGC 6041 can be seen at the top right corner of the image.

Observation data (J2000 epoch)
- Constellation: Hercules
- Right ascension: 16^{h} 04^{m} 39.6^{s}
- Declination: +17° 42′ 03″
- Redshift: 0.034874
- Heliocentric radial velocity: 10455 km/s
- Distance: 143 Mpc (466 Mly)
- Group or cluster: Hercules Cluster
- Apparent magnitude (V): 14.9

Characteristics
- Type: SA0-
- Size: ~119,000 ly (36.50 kpc) (estimated)
- Apparent size (V): 0.9 x 0.7

Other designations
- NGC 6042, CGCG 108-104, DRCG 34-63, MCG 3-41-79, PGC 56972

NGC 6039 is a massive lenticular galaxy located about 460 million light-years away in the constellation Hercules. NGC 6039 was discovered by astronomer Édouard Stephan on June 27, 1870 and later rediscovered by astronomer Lewis Swift on June 27, 1886. NGC 6039 is member of the Hercules Cluster, which is part of the CfA2 Great Wall.

== See also ==
- List of NGC objects (6001–7000)
- NGC 1316
