= Abell 400 =

Galaxy cluster in the constellation Cetus

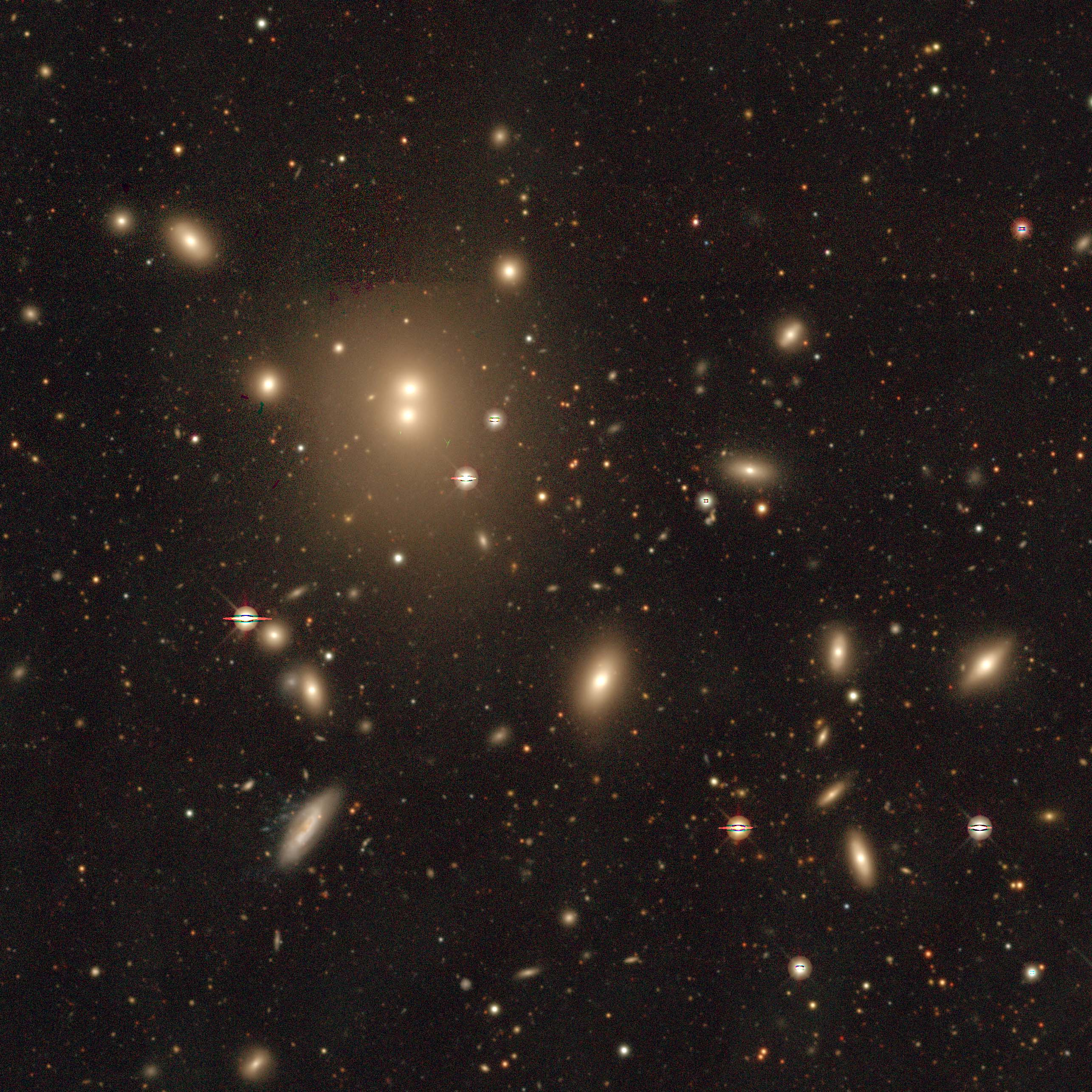
- Abell 400 with the legacy surveys

Observation data (Epoch J2000)
- Constellation: Cetus
- Right ascension: 02^{h} 57^{m} 38.6^{s}
- Declination: +06° 02′ 00″
- Richness class: 1
- Bautz–Morgan classification: II-III
- Redshift: 0.0244 (7 315 km/s)
- Distance: 100 Mpc (326 Mly) h^{−1}_{0.705}
- X-ray flux: (16.2 ± 20.5%)×10^{−12} erg s^{−1} cm^{−2} (0.1–2.4 keV)

Abell 400 is a galaxy cluster which contains the galaxy NGC 1128 with two supermassive black holes (3C 75) spiraling towards merger.

These two supermassive black holes are contained in NGC 1128. The galaxy, microwave radio jets, multi-million degree X-ray producing gas and resultant radio source is known as 3C 75. X-ray source 2A 0252+060 (1H 0253+058, XRS 02522+060) may be some additional or other portion of Abell 400.

The black holes are an estimated 25,000 light years apart, and thus will take millions of years to collide. Should the two supermassive black holes merge, they will form a single super-supermassive black hole.

== Gallery ==
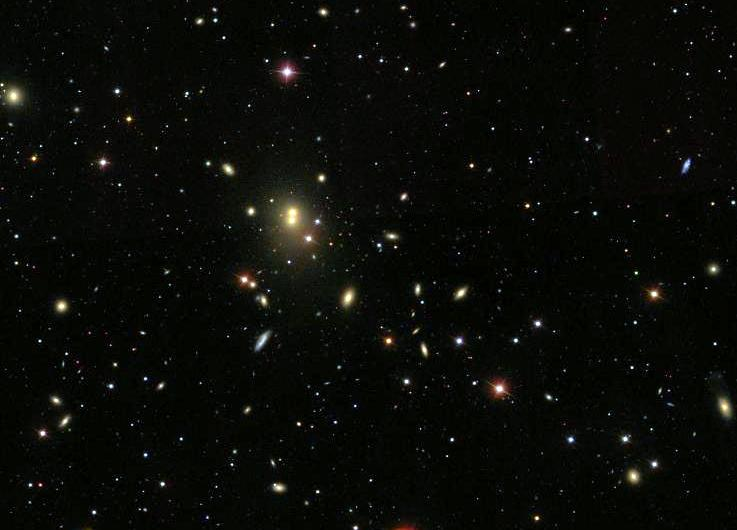
wider view of Abell 400 with PanSTARRS

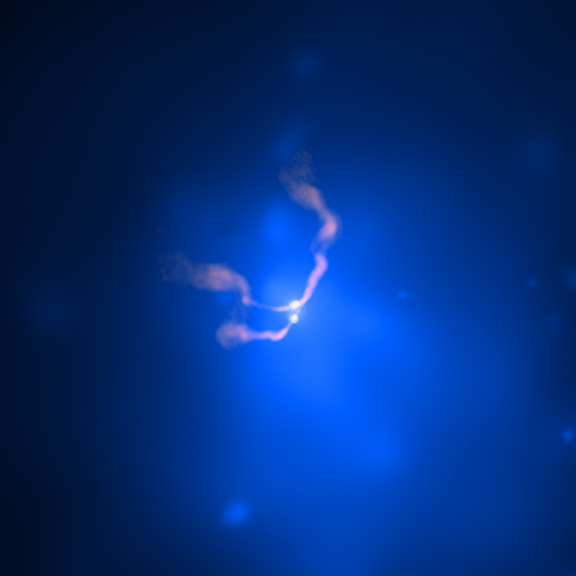
Two supermassive black holes 3C 75 spiraling towards merger near the center of NGC 1128, some 25,000 light years away from each other.

== See also ==
- Abell catalogue
- List of Abell clusters
