= NGC 1128 =

Radio galaxy in the constellation Cetus

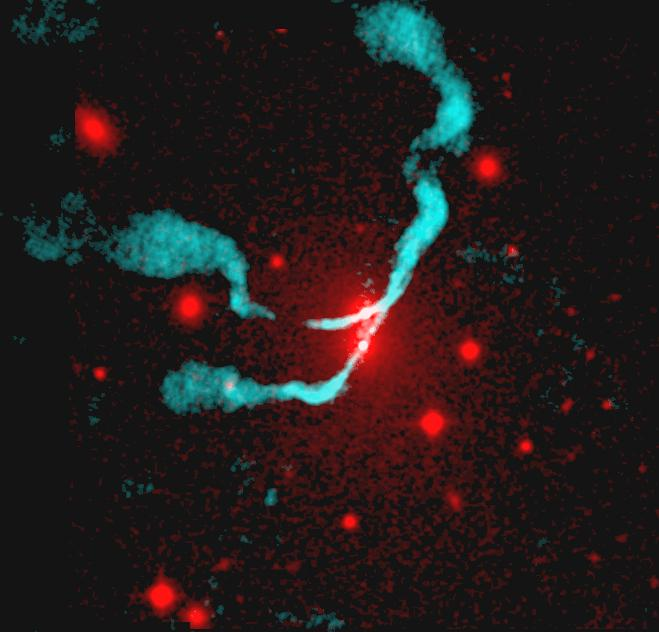
- Binary black hole system 3C 75 contained in the dumbbell shaped galaxy NGC 1128

Observation data (J2000 epoch)
- Constellation: Cetus
- Right ascension: 02^{h} 57^{m} 41.6^{s}
- Declination: +06° 01′ 29″
- Redshift: 6940 ± 20 km/s
- Distance: 300 Mly
- Apparent magnitude (V): 13.8

Characteristics
- Type: E0
- Apparent size (V): 0'.9 × 0'.4
- Notable features: Dumbbell-shaped galaxy

Other designations
- PGC 11188, 11189

NGC 1128 is a dumbbell galaxy in the Abell 400 galaxy cluster. At the center of the galaxy is 3C 75, a radio source, and contains two orbiting supermassive black holes that may be merging. Computer simulations indicate that these two black holes will gradually spiral in toward each other until they merge. Lewis Swift is credited with the discovery of NGC 1128 in 1886.

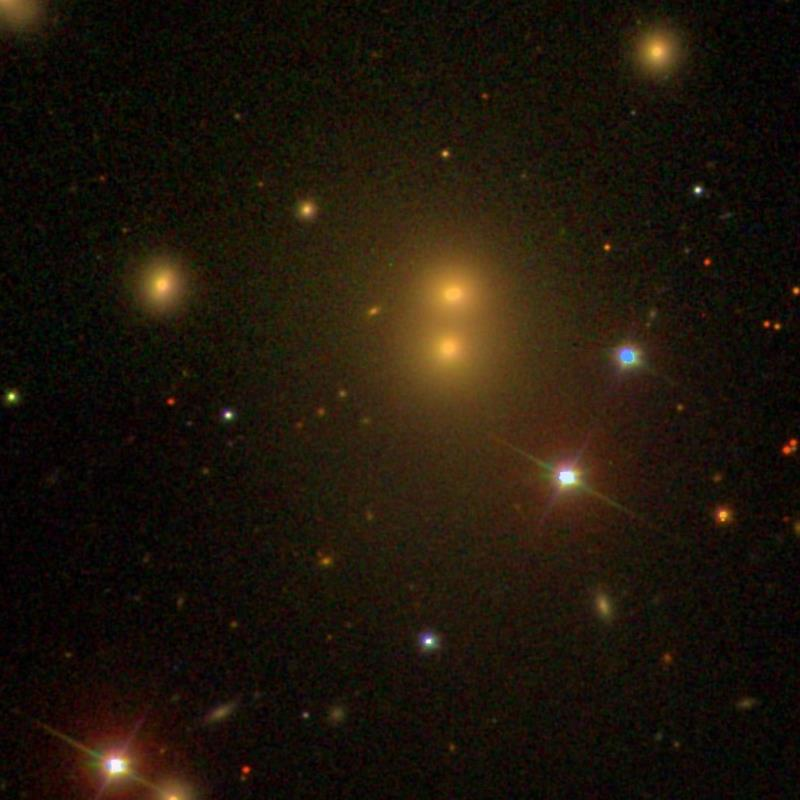
SDSS image of NGC 1128
