= Arp 272 =

Two interacting galaxies in the constellation Hercules

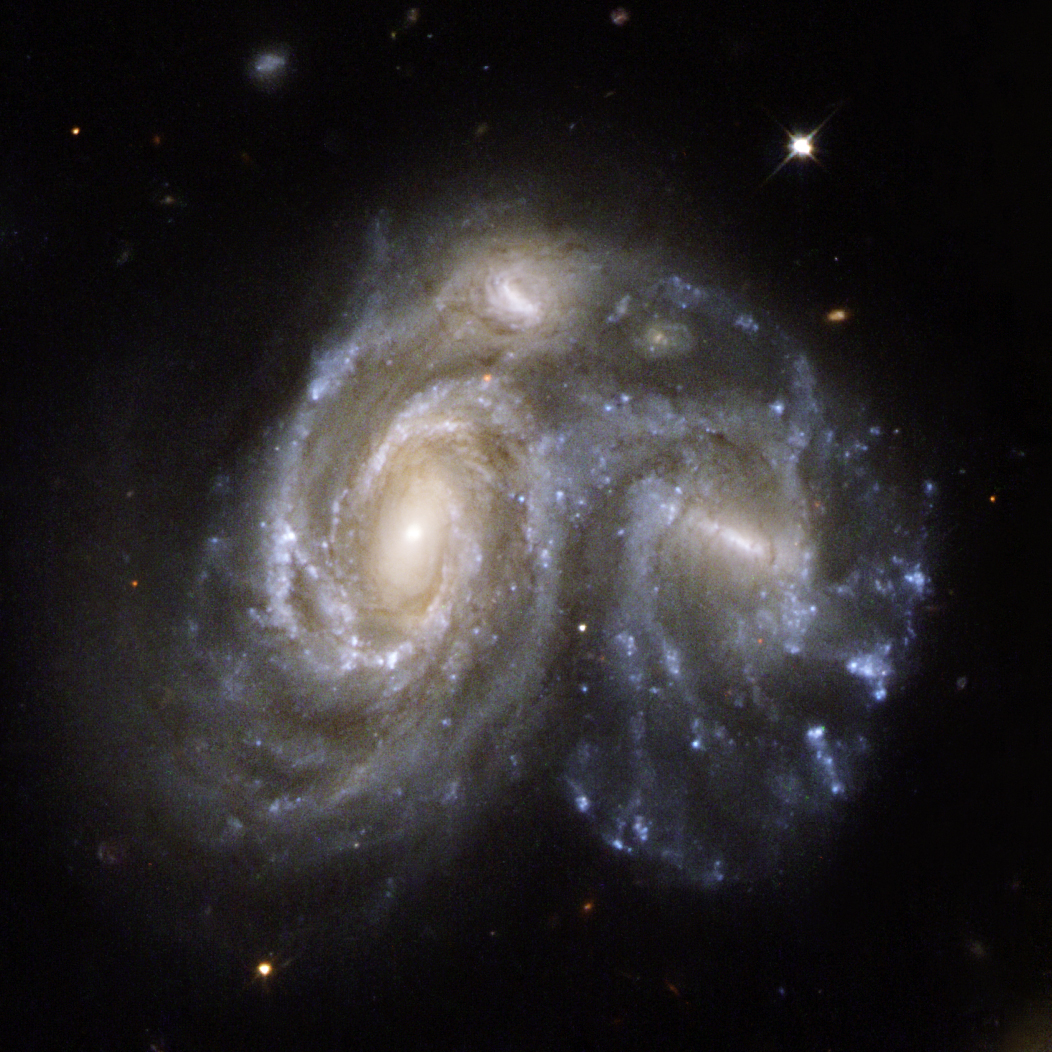
- Arp 272 (NGC 6050, SDSSCGB 4240.3, IC 1179)

Observation data (J2000 epoch)
- Constellation: Hercules
- Right ascension: Left: 16^{h} 05^{m} 23.3^{s} Right: 16^{h} 05^{m} 22.2^{s} Top: 14^{h} 35^{m} 06.354^{s}
- Declination: Left: +17° 45′ 26″ Right: +17° 45′ 15″ Top: +17° 45′ 35″
- Redshift: Left: 0.031928; Right: 0.037116; Top: 0.034239
- Heliocentric radial velocity: Left: 9572 km/s Right: 11127 km/s Top: 10265 km/s
- Distance: 494.13 ± 55.89 Mly (151.5 ± 17.137 Mpc)
- Apparent magnitude (V): Left: 15.2; Right: 16.3; Top: 17.2

Characteristics
- Type: Left: SA(s)c; Right: SB(rs)cd
- Size: Left: 201,600 ly Top: 66,200 ly Right: 106,500 ly
- Apparent size (V): Left: 0.903' × 0.687'; Right: 0.62' × 0.43'
- Notable features: Interacting galaxy triple

Other designations
- Left: NGC 6050, PGC 57058, UGC 10186, MCG+03-41-092, VV 220a Right: IC 1179, PGC 57053, MCG+03-41-093; Top: SDSSCGB 4240.3, SDSS J160522.48+174534.7

Arp 272 is a pair of interacting galaxies consisting of the two spiral galaxies NGC 6050 (left) and IC 1179 (right). Arp 272 lies around 450 million light years from Earth in the constellation of Hercules. The galaxies are part of the Hercules Cluster, which is itself part of the CfA2 Great Wall.

The two galaxies in Arp 272 are in physical contact through their spiral arms. A third galaxy can be seen at the top of them. That 3rd galaxy is also interacting with them.

== Supernova ==
One supernova has been observed in IC 1179:

- SN 2006cd (Type II-P, mag. 18.3) was discovered by Jack B. Newton, T. Crowley, and Tim Puckett, and independently by the Lick Observatory Supernova Search (LOSS), on 8 May 2006.
