= Hercules Cluster =

Galaxy cluster in the constellation Hercules

Observation data (Epoch J2000)
- Constellation: Hercules
- Right ascension: 16^{h} 05^{m} 15.0^{s}
- Declination: +17° 44′ 55″
- Brightest member: NGC 6041
- Number of galaxies: 300
- Richness class: 2
- Bautz–Morgan classification: III
- Redshift: 0.03660 (10 972 km/s)
- Distance: 156 Mpc (509 Mly) h^{−1}_{0.705}
- X-ray flux: (15.00 ± 12.5%)×10^{−12} erg s^{−1} cm^{−2} (0.1—2.4 keV)

Other designations
- Abell 2151

The Hercules Cluster (Abell 2151) is a cluster of about 200 galaxies some 500 million light-years distant in the constellation Hercules. It is rich in spiral galaxies and shows many interacting galaxies. The cluster is part of the larger Hercules Supercluster, which is itself part of the much larger Great Wall super-structure.

The cluster's brightest member is the giant elliptical galaxy NGC 6041.

== See also ==
- Abell catalogue
- List of Abell clusters
- X-ray Astronomy
- NGC 6040
- NGC 6043
- Arp 272
- Galaxy Cluster
- NGC 6045
- NGC 6046
- NGC 6047
- NGC 6039
- NGC 6042
- NGC 6044
