= List of astronomical catalogues =

List from the Alphabet Direction (αβ)

An astronomical catalogue is a list or tabulation of astronomical objects, typically grouped together because they share a common type, morphology, origin, means of detection, or method of discovery. Astronomical catalogues are usually the result of an astronomical survey of some kind.

== 0–9 ==
- 0ES – Einstein Slew Survey, version 0
- 1A, 2A, 3A – Lists of X-ray sources from the Ariel V satellite
- 1C – First Cambridge Catalogue of Radio Sources
- 1ES – Einstein Slew Survey, version 1
- 1FGL, 2FGL – Lists of gamma-ray sources from the Large Area Telescope on board the Fermi Gamma-ray Space Telescope
- 1LHAASO – Large High Altitude Air Shower Observatory Catalogue (Gamma-ray sources)
- 1RXH – ROSAT HRI Pointed Observations
- 1RXS – ROSAT All-Sky Bright Source Catalogue, ROSAT All-Sky Survey Faint Source Catalog
- 1SWASP – SuperWASP
- 2A – see 1A
- 2C – Second Cambridge Catalogue of Radio Sources
- 2E – The Einstein Observatory Soft X-ray Source List
- 2MASS – Two Micron All Sky Survey
  - 1MFGC – Two Micron All Sky Survey Selected Flat Galaxy Catalogue, Release 1
  - 2MASP – Two Micron All Sky Survey, Prototype
  - 2MASSI – Two Micron All Sky Survey, Incremental Release
  - 2MASSW – Two Micron All Sky Survey, Working Database
  - 2MUCD – Ultracool Dwarfs from the 2MASS Catalog
  - 2MASX – Two Micron All Sky Survey, Extended source catalogue
  - 2MASS-GC – (Globular Clusters, I.R.) (2MASS-GC 01 and 2MASS-GC 02 are Hurt 1 and Hurt 2) (source: Bruno Alessi)
  - 2MFGC – Two Micron All Sky Survey Selected Flat Galaxy Catalogue, Release 2
- 3A – see 1A
- 3C (and 3CR) – Third Cambridge Catalogue of Radio Sources (and revised)
- 4C – Fourth Cambridge Survey of Celestial Radio Sources
- 5C – Fifth Cambridge Survey of Radio Sources
- 6C – Sixth Cambridge Survey of Radio Sources
- 7C – Seventh Cambridge Survey of Radio Sources
- 8C – Eighth Cambridge Survey of Radio Sources
- 8pc – 8 parsec listing, all stars within 8 parsecs
- 9C – Ninth Cambridge Survey of Radio Sources
- 10C – Tenth Cambridge Survey of Radio Sources

== A ==
- AAVSO – American Association of Variable Star Observers
- AB – Azzopardi / Breysacher (Wolf-Rayet stars in the Small Magellanic Cloud, SMC)
- Abel (globular star clusters)
- Abell – Abell catalogue
  - Abell S – Abell Supplementary Southern Catalogue
- Abetti – Giorgio Abetti (double stars)
- Abt – (for example: open star cluster Abt 1 = Byurakan 4 = Markarian 6 = Stock 7) (at 2:29.6 / +60°39' near the southwestern section of the Heart Nebula in Cassiopeia)
- AC – Astrographic Catalogue
- A.C. – Alvan Clark (double stars)
- Ac / Ack – Agnès Acker (planetary nebulae)
- ACT-CL – Atacama Cosmology Telescope Galaxy Cluster Catalogue
- A.G.C. – Alvan Graham Clark (double stars)
- AGC – Arecibo General Catalog
- ADS – Aitken Double Star Catalogue
- AFGL – Air Force Geophysical Laboratory
- Ag – Estela L. Agüero (catalogue of peculiar galaxies, captured during the National Geographic Society – Palomar Observatory Sky Survey) (POSS)
- AG, AGK, AGKR – Astronomische Gesellschaft Katalog
- AH03 – (star clusters) (source: Bruno Alessi's list)
- AJG – Anne J. Green (supernova remnants)
- Al – David Anthony Allen (planetary nebulae)
- Alden – Harold Lee Alden (double stars)
- Alessi – Bruno Sampaio Alessi's catalogue of telescopic asterisms and open star clusters
- Alessi / Teutsch – Bruno S. Alessi's and Philipp Teutsch's catalogue of telescopic asterisms and open star clusters
- Ali – H. Ali (double stars)
- Alicante (for example: open star cluster Alicante 1 at 3:59:18 / +57°14'14", in Camelopardalis). Alicante 1 looks like a chain of dim stars with two relatively bright accompanying stars known as TYC 3725-498-1 and TYC 3725-866-1 (source: Wikisky)
- Aller – R.M. Aller (double stars) (Ramón María Aller Ulloa?)
- ALS – UBV beta database for Case-Hamburg Northern and Southern Luminous Stars
- Alter – (open star clusters) (for example: Alter 1 at 0:31:56.9 / +63°09'47" in Cassiopeia) (Alter 1 = King 14 = Alter Cluster)
- Alves / Yun – (open star clusters)
- AM – Arp-Madore catalogue of open and globular star clusters (Halton Arp / Barry F. Madore) (for example: Arp-Madore 1 in Horologium, Arp-Madore 2 in Puppis)
- An – Anderson (double stars) (John August Anderson?)
- Andrews / Lindsay (AL) – (open star clusters) (for example: Andrews-Lindsay 1 at 13:15:16 / -65°55'12" in Musca) (AL 1 is also known as vdB-Hagen 144)
- Annis – (?)
- APEC – Asteroids Past Earth Close Encounters, Sormano Astronomical Observatory
- APM – Automatic Plate Measuring machine
- Ap – S. P. Apriamasvili (Apriamashvili) or Semen Petrovich Apriamasvili (Russian: Семен Петрович Априамашвили) (open star clusters) (the open star cluster Basel 1 at about one degree WNW of Messier 11 is also known as the Apriamashvili cluster)
- Ara – (for example: Ara 2035 at 7:08.8/-24°03' in Canis Major) (S.Aravamudan?)
- Arak / Ark – Marat Arsen Arakelian, 1929–1983 (Arakelian Emission Line Objects)
- Arce / Goodman – (open star clusters)
- Archinal – probably Brent A. Archinal (for example: open star cluster Archinal 1 at 18:54:49 / +5°32'54" in Serpens Cauda)
- Arg – Friedrich Wilhelm Argelander (double stars)
- ARO – Algonquin Radio Observatory
- Arp – Atlas of Peculiar Galaxies
- ASCC – Nina V. Kharchenko, All-Sky Compiled Catalogue, Kinematika Fiz. Nebesn. Tel., 17, part no 5, 409 (2001)
- AT-HYG – Augmented Tycho + HYG (Hipparcos, Yale, and Gliese) database
- Auner – (for example: open star cluster Auner 1 at 7:04:16 / -19°45'00" in Canis Major) (Auner 1 is the cluster which was "lost" in the disturbing ghost reflection of nearby Alpha Canis Majoris, aka Sirius, this during the Palomar Observatory Sky Survey, POSS)
- Av – Anna Antalová (open star clusters) (for example: Antalova 1 at 17:28:55 / -31°34'11' in Scorpius)
- Avedisova – Virginia Avedisova (star-forming regions)
- Av-Hunter – Aveni / Hunter (open star clusters) (for example: Aveni-Hunter 1 at 23:37:48 / +48°31'12", north of the former constellation Honores Friderici in Andromeda)
- AXP – Anomalous X-Ray Pulsar
- AZ / AzV – Azzopardi-Vigneau (Marc Anthony Azzopardi and Jean Vigneau)
- AzTEC – Astronomical Thermal Emission Camera

== B ==
- β – Sherburne Wesley Burnham (double stars)
- βpm – Burnham's measures of proper motion stars, 1913 catalogue
- B – Willem H. van den Bos (double stars)
- B – E. E. Barnard's List of Dark Nebulae
- B2 — Bologna Sky Survey at 408 MHz (9929 radio sources) performed with the Northern Cross Radio Telescope
- B3 — The New Bologna Sky Survey at 408 MHz (13354 radio sources) performed with the Northern Cross Radio Telescope
- Ba – Barnard (double stars)
- Ba – Walter Baade (planetary nebulae)
- BAC – Bordeaux Astrographic Catalog
- Bail / Bal – René Baillaud (double stars)
- Baize / Baz – Paul Baize (Paul Achille-Ariel Baize, 1901–1995) (double stars)
- Balbinot (open and globular star clusters) (for example: globular star cluster Balbinot 1 in Pegasus)
- Bar – Klavdiâ Barkhatova (open star clusters) (for example: Barkhatova 1, NNW of NGC 7000; the North America Nebula in Cygnus)
- BAR – E. E. Barton (double stars)
- Bas – Basel (open star clusters) (for example: Basel 1 at about one degree WNW of open star cluster Messier 11 in Scutum) (Basel 1 is also known as the Apriamashvili cluster)
- Bat – Hans Battermann, 1860–1922 (double stars)
- BAT99 – The Fourth Catalogue of Population I Wolf–Rayet stars in the Large Magellanic Cloud
- BAY – Uranometria (Bayer designation)
- BCDSP – Bica-Claria-Dottori-Santos-Piatti
- BCVS – Bibliographic Catalogue of Variable Stars
- BD – Bonner Durchmusterung
- BDS – Burnham Double Star Catalogue
- BDS03 (I.R.) – (open star clusters)
- BDSB – (for example: open star cluster BDSB 96 at 7:05:18 / -12°19'44")
- BDSB03 (I.R.) – (open star clusters)
- [BE74] – Bohannan-Epps, 1974 (emission-line stars)
- Be – Nils Bergvall (catalogue of some 400 interacting and distorted galaxies found on glass copies of the ESO Blue Survey)
- Be – Berkeley (open star clusters) (104 items)
- Be – Claes Bernes (dark nebulae)
- Bedin – Luigi Bedin (for example: dwarf spheroidal galaxy Bedin I in Pavo)
- Ben – Bennett Catalogue: Jack Bennett / John Caister Bennett's catalogue of 152 deep-sky objects in the southern celestial hemisphere, all from the NGC or IC lists, except Ben 47 which is Melotte 105 in Carina, and Ben 72a which is Trumpler 23 in Norma
- Bergeron – Joe Bergeron (for example: Bergeron 1 in Cepheus)
- BFS – Blitz-Fitch-Stark (galactic nebulae) (for example: BFS 15 in Cepheus)
- BH – Van den Bergh / Hagen (open star clusters), see also VdB-Ha
- BHR – Bourke-Hyland-Robinson (molecular clouds)
- Bhas/Bha – T. P. Bhaskaran (double stars)
- Bi – Byurakan (open star clusters)
- Bica – Eduardo Luiz Damiani Bica (open star clusters)
- Bica / Schmitt (open star clusters)
- Big – Guillaume Bigourdan (double stars)
- Bird – F. Bird (double stars)
- Bl – Víctor Manuel Blanco (for example: open star cluster Blanco 1 in Sculptor)
- BlDz – Blaauw-Danziger (planetary nebulae)
- Bloch/Blo – Marie Bloch (double stars)
- Bo – Bochum Observatory (open star clusters)
- Bo – Bond (double stars)
- BoBn – Boeshaar-Bond (planetary nebulae) (for example: BoBn 1, an extragalactic planetary nebula at 0:37 / -13°42' in Cetus)
- Bode – (telescopic asterisms)
- Boe – Ernest Augustus Boeger (double stars)
- Bogleiv (open star clusters)
- Bonatto – Charles José Bonatto (open star clusters)
- Boo – Samuel Latimer Boothroyd, 1874–1965 (double stars)
- Boy – Charles Stuart Bowyer (double stars)
- BPI – (open star clusters)
- BPM / L – Bruce Proper Motion Survey (Luyten)
- BPMA – Bordeaux Catalogue (double stars)
- Bradley
- Brandt – (for example: open star cluster Brandt 1 at 8:09:32 / -47°20'12") ( = Pozzo 1) (very near Gamma Velorum, also known as 'Regor')
- Brand / Wouterloot (BW) (open star clusters)
- Brey – Jacques Breysacher, Large Magellanic Cloud Wolf–Rayet stars
- BRI – B_{j}, R, I survey
- Briceno (open star clusters) – César Briceño (for example: Briceno 1 at the star 25 Orionis)
- BRHT – Bhatia-Read-Hatzidimitriou-Tritton
- Brosch – Noah Brosch (open star clusters)
- Brso/Bso – Brisbane Observatory, Australia (double stars)
- Brt – Samuel Goodwin Barton (double stars)
- Btz – Ernst Bernewitz (double stars)
- Bry – Walter William Bryant (double stars)
- BSDL – Bica-Schmitt-Dutra-Oliveira Cluster
- BV – Bohm-Vitense (planetary nebulae)
- BVD – Rafael Benavides Palencia (double stars)

== C ==
- C – Caldwell catalogue (Sir Patrick Moore)
- Caballero-Solano – (for example: open star cluster Caballero-Solano 1 at Delta Orionis, also known as the Mintaka cluster)
- Calvet – Nuria Calvet (telescopic asterisms)
- Camargo – Denilso Camargo (open star clusters)
- Canali – (telescopic asterisms)
- CAPERS – CANDELS-Area Prism Epoch of Reionization Survey
- Capo/Cpo – Cape Observatory, South Africa (double stars)
- CARMA
- Carpenter – (for example: Carpenter 1 at galactic coordinates 213.34 / -12.60) (= BDB 229, = FSR 1086, = MWSC 732)
- Carraro – (for example: open star cluster Carraro 1 at 10:37:00 / -58°44'00") (NW of the Eta Carinae Nebula)
- Casado – Juan Casado (open star clusters)
- CBB – (open star clusters)
- CCCP-Cl – (open star clusters)
- CCCP-Gp – (open star clusters)
- CCCS – Catalogue of Cool Carbon Stars
- CCDM – Catalog of Components of Double and Multiple Stars
- CCO – Catalogue of Cometary Orbits
- CCS – General Catalogue of Cool Carbon Stars
  - CCS2 – General Catalog of S Stars, second edition
- CD / CoD – Cordoba Durchmusterung
- CDIMP – Catalogue of Discoveries and Identifications of Minor Planets
- CED – Sven Cederblad (gaseous nebula)
- CEL – Celescope Catalogue of Ultraviolet Magnitudes
- CEERS – Cosmic Evolution Early Release Science Survey
- Cezar – (for example: Cezar 6 at galactic coordinates 204.93 / -13.83)
- CF – Cape Observatory Faint Stars survey (Spencer Jones)
- CFBDSIR – Canada-France Brown Dwarfs Survey-InfraRed
- CG – Cometary Globule (for example: CG 4 in Puppis, also known as 'God's Hand')
- CGCG – Catalogue of Galaxies and Clusters of Galaxies
- CGCS – Catalogue of Galactic Cool Carbon Stars
- CGMW – Candidate Galaxy behind the Milky Way (planetary nebulae)
- CGO – Catalogue of Galactic O Stars
- CGSS – Catalogue of Galactic S Stars
- CH – Casado-Hendey (open clusters)
- Chaple – Glenn Chaple (for example: Chaple 1 at galactic coordinates 74.46 / +3.66, which is an asterism called Chaple's Arc, and also Cygnus Fairy Ring, and HD 190466 Group, and Ramakers 20)
- Chatard – Jean-Pierre Chatard (telescopic asterisms)
- Che – P. S. Chevalier (double stars)
- Chereul – E. Chereul (moving groups of stars)
- Chiravalle – John Chiravalle (for example: Chiravalle 1 in Hercules, at galactic coordinates 75.25 / +27.91, which is an asterism called Candle and Holder).
- Chupina – Natalia Victorovna Chupina (Chupina objects 1 to 5 are located at and near open star cluster Messier 67 in Cancer)
- CIO – Catalog of Infrared Observations
- CLUST – (open star clusters)
- CMC – Carlsberg Meridian Catalogue
- Cn – Cannon (planetary nebulae) (Cn1 / Cn2 / Cn3)
- Cog – Wilbur Adelman Cogshall (double stars)
- Col – Collins (double stars)
- Com – George Cary Comstock (double stars)
- Cop – Ralph Copeland (double stars)
- Coro/Coo – Córdoba Observatory, Argentina (double stars)
- CoRoT – CoRoT Catalogue
  - CoRoT-Exo – CoRoT Catalogue
- Cou – Paul Couteau (double stars)
- CP – Cambridge Pulsar
- CPC – Cape Photographic Catalogue
- CPD – Cape Photographic Durchmusterung
- Cr – Collinder (open star clusters) (Per Collinder)
- Crinklaw – Greg Crinklaw (telescopic asterisms)
- CRL – Cambridge Research Laboratory Sky-Survey (three color infrared sky survey)
- Cruls/Cru – Luís Cruls (double stars)
- CRTS – Catalina Real-Time Transient Survey (transient and variable objects)
- CSC/CXO – Chandra X-Ray Observatory Source Catalogue (X-ray sources)
  - 2CXO – Chandra X-ray Observatory release 2
  - CXOCDFS – Chandra X-ray Observatory Deep-Field South Survey
  - CXOGC – Chandra X-ray Observatory Galactic Center Catalogue
  - CXOM31 – Chandra X-ray Observatory Messier 31 Catalogue (used for X-ray sources in M31)
  - CXOU – Chandra X-ray Observatory Unregistered Catalogue
- CSI – Catalog of Stellar Identifications
- CSV – Catalog of Suspected Variables
- CSS – General Catalogue of S Stars
- CTA – Caltech Observatory, list A (galactic nebulae)
- CTB – Caltech Observatory, list B (galactic nebulae)
- CTSS – Capellaro-Turatto-Salvadori-Sabbadin (planetary nebulae)
- CWNU – China West Normal University (star clusters)
- Cz – Mieczysław Czernik (open star clusters)

== D ==
- D – James Dunlop (A catalogue of nebulae and clusters of stars in the southern hemisphere, observed at Parramatta in New South Wales)
- DA – Dominion Observatory List A
- Dachs SMC – Joachim Dachs (stars in the Small Magellanic Cloud)
- Danjon – André-Louis Danjon (double stars)
- Danks – (open star clusters) (for example: Danks 1 & 2, located near the northeastern Centaurus section of the Coalsack Nebula)
- Dawes – William Rutter Dawes (double stars)
- δ – Bernhard Hildebrandt Dawson (double stars)
- DBSB03, I.R. – (open star clusters)
- DB2000 (Dutra-Bica 2000, I.R.) (open star clusters)
- DB2001 (Dutra-Bica 2001, I.R.) (open star clusters)
- DC – Drake Cluster (open star clusters) (Andrew John Drake)
- DCld – A catalogue of southern dark clouds
- DdDm – Dolidze-Dzimselejsvili (planetary nebulae)
- DDO – David Dunlap Observatory (Dwarf Galaxies)
- DeHt – Dengel-Hartl (Dengl-Hartl) (planetary nebulae) (for example: DeHt 1 at 5:55 / -22°54' in Lepus)
- Dem – Ercole Dembowski (double stars)
- DEM L – Davies-Elliott-Meaburn Large Magellanic Cloud (deep sky objects)
- DEM S – Davies-Elliott-Meaburn Small Magellanic Cloud (deep sky objects)
- DENIS – Deep Near Infrared Survey of the Southern Sky
  - DENIS-P – Deep Near Infrared Survey, Provisory designation
- Desvoivres – Emmanuel Desvoivres (telescopic asterisms)
- DG – Dorschner-Gürtler (galactic nebulae)
- DHW – Dengel-Hartl-Weinberger (planetary nebulae)
- Dias – Wilton S. Dias, UNIFEI (open star clusters)
- Dick – J. Dick (double stars)
- Djorg – Stanislav George Djorgovski (globular star clusters) (for example: Djorgovski 1 in Scorpius)
- Dju – Petar Đurković (P. Djurkovic) (double stars)
- DM – Durchmusterung
  - BD – Bonner Durchmusterung
  - CD / CoD – Cordoba Durchmusterung
  - CPD – Cape Photographic Durchmusterung
- DN – Duus-Newell (Catalogue of Southern Groups and Clusters of Galaxies) (Alan Duus / Barry Newell)
- DO – Dearborn Observatory
- Do – Madona V. Dolidze (open star clusters) (57 items)
- Dob – August William Doberck (double stars)
- DOBASHI – Kazuhito Dobashi (dark clouds)
- Dom – Jean Dommanget (double stars)
- Don – Henry Frederick Donner (double stars)
- Donatiello – Giuseppe Donatiello (for example: dwarf spheroidal galaxy Donatiello I in Andromeda)
- Doo – Eric Doolittle (double stars)
- DoDz – Dolidze-Dzimselejsvili (open star clusters) (11 items)
- Dorpat – Dorpat Observatory, Estonia
- DR – Downes and Rinehart microwave sources
- Du – Nils Christoffer Dunér (double stars)
- Δ – James Dunlop (double stars)
- Dutra-Bica – Carlos Maximiliano Dutra and Eduardo Luiz Damiani Bica (open star clusters)
- DWB – Dickel, Wendker, Bieritz (A catalogue of optically visible HII regions in the Cygnus X region)
- Dwingeloo – Dwingeloo Obscured Galaxy Survey (DOGS) (for example: Dwingeloo 1 and Dwingeloo 2 in Cassiopeia)

== E ==
- E – (for example: globular star cluster E 3 at 9:20:59 / -77°16'57", in Chamaeleon) (source: Bruno S. Alessi's and Wilton S. Dias's lists)
- EC – Edinburgh-Cape Blue Object Survey
- ECC – Early Cold Core Catalogue
- eFEDS – eROSITA Final Equatorial Depth Survey (X-ray sources)
- Edg – Daniel W. Edgecomb (double stars)
- [EG97] – Eckart + Genzel, 1997 (Stars close to Sagittarius A*, like [EG97]S2.)
- Egb – Egbert (double stars)
- EGB – Ellis-Grayson-Bond (planetary nebulae)
- Eggen – Olin J. Eggen (double stars)
- EGGR – Eggen-Greenstein proper motion star
- Ek – Sven Eklund (planetary nebula candidates)
- EkGo – Eklund-Goodhew (planetary nebula candidates)
- Elosser – David Elosser (telescopic asterisms)
- EMP – Ephemerides of Minor Planets
- Eng – Engelmann (double stars)
- EPIC – Ecliptic Plane Input Catalog
- Escorial – (open star clusters)
- ESO – European Southern Observatory Catalog, ESO/Uppsala catalog
- Esp – T. E. H. Espin (double stars)
- Es/Birm – Espin/Birmingham (catalogue of red stars)
- ETHOS – Extreme Turquoise Halo Object Survey (planetary nebulae, like ETHOS 1)

== F ==
- F – Fath – Edward Arthur Fath, 1880–1959 (for example: galaxy Fath 703, aka NGC 5892, in Libra)
- Fa – Fairall (Anthony Patrick Fairall, 1943–2008)
- Fal – Bray Falls (planetary nebulae) (Example: Fal 1)
- FalFer – Bray Falls and Chester Hall-Fernandez (planetary nebulae)
- FCC – Fornax Cluster Catalogue
- Fei – Feinstein (open star clusters) (for example: Feinstein 1 at 11:05:56 / -59°49'00" in Carina)
- Feibelman (for example: open star cluster Feibelman 1 near 'The Revenante of the Swan' 34-P Cygni)
- Feigelson – Eric D. Feigelson (for example: open star cluster Feigelson 1 at 11:59:51 / -78°12'27", in Chamaeleon, at the binary star Epsilon Chamaeleonis)
- Ferrero (telescopic asterisms)
- Φ – William Stephen Finsen (double stars)
- Fg – Williamina Fleming (planetary nebulae), for example: Fleming 1
- FK4 – Fourth Fundamental Catalogue
- FK5 – Fifth Fundamental Catalogue
- Fle – Joachim Otto Fleckenstein (double stars)
- FLM – Historia coelestis Britannica (Flamsteed designation)
- For – Lucien Forgeron (double stars)
- Fox – Philip Fox (double stars)
- frEGGs – Free-floating Evaporating Gaseous Globules
- French – Sue French (from Sky and Telescope)
- Fr – Frolov (open star clusters) (for example: Frolov 1 at 23:57:25 / +61°37'48" in Cassiopeia)
- Franz – J. Franz (double stars)
- Frh – Ragnar Furuhjelm (double stars)
- Frk – W. S. Franks (double stars and colours of stars) (probably William Sadler Franks, published a catalogue of the colours of 3890 stars)
- FSC – Faint Source Catalogue
- FSR – Froebrich-Scholz-Raftery, I.R. (open and globular star clusters) (for example: globular star cluster FSR 1758 in Scorpius)
- Fur – Herbert Henry Furner (double stars)

== G ==
- G – Lowell Proper Motion Survey (Giclas)
  - GD – Lowell Proper Motion Survey (Giclas dwarf)
  - GR* – Lowell Proper Motion Survey (Giclas red star)
  - HG – Lowell Proper Motion Survey (Giclas Hyades)
- Gale – Walter Frederick Gale (double stars)
- Gallo – Joaquín Gallo (double stars)
- GAn – G. Anderson (double stars)
- Gaia catalogues (general purpose)
  - Gaia DR1 – Gaia data release 1
  - Gaia DR2 – Gaia data release 2
  - Gaia EDR3 – Early Gaia data release 3
  - Gaia DR3 – Gaia data release 3
- GC – Catalogue of Nebulae and Clusters of Stars
- GC (Boss) – Boss general catalogue of 33342 stars
- GCRV – General Catalogue of Stellar Radial Velocities
- GCTP – General Catalogue of Trigonometric Parallaxes
- GCVS – General Catalog of Variable Stars
- GGD – Gyulbudaghian-Glushkov-Denisyuk (deep sky objects)
- Giclas – Henry L. Giclas (double stars)
- Gl / GJ – Gliese–Jahreiß catalogue or Gliese–Jahreiß catalogue
- GJJC – Gillett-Jacoby-Joyce-Cohen (planetary nebulae)
- Gli – James Melville Gilliss (double stars)
- GLIMPSE – (together with Mercer in the list of 10978 star clusters)
- GLMP – Garcia-Lario-Manchado-Pych (planetary nebulae)
- Glp – S. de Glasenapp (double stars)
- GM – Gyulbudaghian-Maghakian (planetary nebulae) (Armen L. Gyulbudaghian and Tigran Yu. Magakian)
- GMBCG – Gaussian Mixture Brightest Cluster Galaxy Catalogue (galaxy clusters)
- GMP – Godwin-Metcalfe-Peach (galaxies in the Coma Cluster)
- GN – Atlas Galaktischer Nebel (galactic nebulae)
- GOODS-N – Great Observatories Origins Deep Survey North
- GOODS-S – Great Observatories Origins Deep Survey South
- Gol – Hermann Goldschmidt (double stars)
- GOS – Galactic O Star Catalogue
  - GOSSS – Galactic O-Star Spectroscopic Survey
- Goyal – A.N. Goyal (double stars)
- Graham (for example: open star cluster Graham 1 at 10:56:32 / -63:01:04 in Carina)
- Gr – Grant (double stars)
- Grasdalen – Gary Lars Grasdalen (open star clusters)
- GR – Gibson Reaves (for example: Gibson Reaves 8 (GR 8) (galaxy) in Virgo) (Gibson Reaves, 1923–2005)
- GRB – Gamma Ray Burst
- Grindlay – Jonathan E. Grindlay (globular star clusters) (for example: Grindlay 1 in Scorpius, at 17:32.0 / -33°50')
- GRO – Gamma Ray Observatory (NASA – Compton)
- Groombridge – (Stephen Groombridge, 1755–1832)
- GSC – Guide Star Catalog
  - GSC2 / GSC II – Guide Star Catalog II
- GSPC – Guide Star Photometric Catalog
  - GSPC2 – Guide Star Photometric Catalog, 2nd
- Gsh – James Glaisher (double stars)
- GSH / GS – Giant supershell/superbubble
- GΣ – G. Struve (double stars)
- Gtb – K. Gottlieb (double stars)
- Gui – Joseph Guillaume (double stars)
- Gum – Gum catalog of emission nebulae

== H ==
- h – John Herschel (double stars)
- H – Haro (planetary nebulae)
- H – Harvard (open star clusters)
- H – William Herschel (double stars)
- HA – ? (for example: galaxy HA 85 in Telescopium, see chart 26 in Wil Tirion's Sky-Atlas 2000.0) (however, chart 435 in Uranometria 2000.0, Volume 2, 1987 edition, shows this object as ESO 183-G30)
- Haf – Hans Haffner (open star clusters)
- Hall – Asaph Hall (double stars)
- HAT-P – HATNet Project, Hungarian Automated Telescope Network (search for extrasolar planets)
- HATS – HATNet Project, southern hemisphere.
- HaTr – Hartl-Tritton (planetary nebulae)
- HaWe – Hartl-Weinberger (planetary nebulae)
- Haufen – (for example: Haufen A in Cetus, at 1h 08.9m / -15° 25' (2000.0), which is, according to Sky Catalogue 2000.0, Volume 2, the same as Abell 151)
- Hav/Moffat – Havlen-Moffat (open star clusters)
- Hb – Hubble (planetary nebulae)
- HBC – Herbig-Bell Catalogue (planetary nebulae)
- HC – Howell-Crisp (planetary nebulae)
- HCG – Hickson Compact Group
- HCWils – Herbert Couper Wilson (double stars)
- HD – Henry Draper Catalogue
- HDE – Henry Draper Extension
- HDEC – Henry Draper Extension Charts
- HdO – Harvard Observatory USA, and stations elsewhere (double stars)
- HDW – Hartl-Dengel-Weinberger (planetary nebulae)
- Hdz – Harvard Zone Catalogues (double stars)
- HE – Hamburg/ESO Survey
- He – Henize (planetary nebulae)
- Hen – Henize Catalogues of Hα-Emission Stars and Nebulae in the Magellanic Clouds
- Hewett – Paul Hewett (planetary nebulae)
- Hf – Dorrit Hoffleit (planetary nebulae)
- HFG – Heckathorn-Fesen-Gull (planetary nebulae)
- HH – Herbig-Haro object
- HIC – Hipparcos Input Catalogue
- HIP – Hipparcos Catalogue
- HIPASS – HI Parkes All-Sky Survey
- Hld – Edward S. Holden (double stars)
- Hlm – Edwin Holmes (double stars)
- Hln – Francis "Frank" Holden (double stars)
- HN – William Herschel's 1821 catalogue (double stars)
- Ho – Helen Sawyer Hogg (open star clusters)
- Ho – George W. Hough (double stars)
- Holmberg – Erik Holmberg (dwarf irregular galaxies)
- Hooke – Robert Hooke (double stars)
- Howe – Herbert Alonzo Howe (double stars)
- HP – Haute-Provence Observatory (globular star clusters) (for example: HP 1 in Ophiuchus, at 17:31.1 / -29°59')
- HR – Bright Star Catalogue (Harvard Revised Catalogue)
- Hrg – Lawrence Hargrave (double stars)
- Hrr – Phil Harrington (telescopic asterisms)
- HΣ – Hermann von Struve (double stars)
- HS – Hamburg Survey (quasars and blue stars)
- HSC – Hubble Source Catalog (lists of sources from the Hubble Space Telescope)
- Hst – Charles S. Hastings (double stars)
- HT – Hidden Treasures catalogue by Stephen James O'Meara
- Hu – Milton L. Humason (planetary nebulae)
- Hu – William J. Hussey (double stars)
- HuBi – Hu-Bibo (planetary nebulae) (J. Y. Hu and E. A. Bibo)
- HuDo – Hu-Dong (planetary nebulae)
- Hurt – Robert Hurt (for example: globular star cluster Hurt 2, aka 2MASS-GC02 in Sagittarius)
- Huygens – Christiaan Huygens (double stars)
- HV – Harvard Variable
- HVGC – Hyper Velocity Globular Cluster (for example: HVGC-1 in the supergiant elliptical galaxy Messier 87 in Virgo)
- HVS – HyperVelocity Stars
- HW – Hodge-Wright
- Hynek – J. Allen Hynek (double stars)
- Hz – Wulff-Dieter Heintz (double stars)
- Hzg – Ejnar Hertzsprung (double stars)

== I ==
- I – Robert Thorburn Ayton Innes (R.T.A. Innes, 1861–1933) (double stars)
- IC – Index Catalogue
  - IC I – Index Catalogue I
  - IC II – Index Catalogue II
- IDCS – IRAC Distant Cluster Survey
- IDS – Index Catalogue of Visual Double Stars
- IGR – Integral Gamma-Ray source
- IPHAS – The INT Photometric Hα Survey of the Northern Galactic Plane
- IPHASX – INT/WFC Photometric Hα Survey extended object
- IRAS – Infrared Astronomical Satellite
- IRS – International Reference Star
- IRSF – Infrared Survey Facility
- Isk – Srbuhi "Sofik" Gevorg Iskudarian (open star clusters) (for example: Iskudarian 1 in the northern section of the rhombus β, γ, δ, and ζ Lyrae)
- Isserstedt – Jörg Isserstedt (telescopic asterisms)
- IsWe – Ishida-Weinberger (planetary nebulae)
- Ivanov (open star clusters)

== J ==
- J – Robert Jonckheere's catalogue of double star observations (see for an article about it)
- Ja – Harold Jacoby (planetary nebulae) (for example: Jacoby 1 at 15:23 / +52°14' in Boötes)
- JaFu – Jacoby-Fullton (planetary nebulae)
- JAn – John August Anderson (double stars)
- Jc – William Stephen Jacob (double stars)
- Jef – Hamilton Moore Jeffers (double stars)
- Jn – Rebecca Jones (planetary nebulae) (for example: Jones 1 at 23:36 / +30°28' in Pegasus)
- JnEr – Jones-Emberson (planetary nebulae) (for example: Jones-Emberson 1 in Lynx, also known as the Headphone Nebula) (Rebecca Jones and Richard M. Emberson)
- Jo – Jones (double stars)
- Johansson – (open star clusters) (for example: Johansson 1 at 15:46:20 / -52:22:54 in Norma)
- Joy – Alfred Harrison Joy (double stars)
- JP11 – a 1978 catalog compiling photometric measurements in Harold Johnson's 11-color photometric system
- Jsp – Morris Ketchum Jessup (double stars)
- Juchert – Matthias Juchert (open star clusters)
- Juchert-Saloranta – Matthias Juchert and Jaakko Saloranta (telescopic asterisms)
- JW – Jones' & Walker's list of stars near the Orion Nebula.

== K ==
- K – Luboš Kohoutek (planetary nebulae)
- K – Köhler's Deepsky Catalogue
- Ka – Valentina Karachentseva (dwarf galaxies)
- Ka LMC – Sebastian Kamann (Example: Planetary nebula Ka LMC 1)
- Karhula – Timo Karhula (for example: open star cluster Karhula 1 near planetary nebula Messier 76 in Perseus)
- K2 – K2 (Kepler extended mission) catalog
- KELT – Kilodegree Extremely Little Telescope (search for extrasolar planets)
- Kemble – Father Lucian Kemble (asterisms which could be observed through binoculars, for example: Kemble 1, aka Kemble's Cascade in Camelopardalis)
- Kepler – Kepler catalog
- Kes – Michael J. Kesteven (supernova remnants). For example: Kesteven 79
- KFR – Kerber-Furlan-Roth (planetary nebulae)
- K / Kg – Ivan R. King (open star clusters)
- KGZ – Catalogue de Zimmerman
- Kharchenko – Nina V. Kharchenko (for example: open star cluster Kharchenko 1 at 6:08:48 / +24:19:54 near or at Messier 35 in Gemini)
- KIC – Kepler Input Catalog
- Kim – Dongwon Kim (for example: globular star cluster Kim 2 in Indus)
- KjPn – Kazaryan-Parsamyan (planetary nebulae)
- Klemola (for example: Klemola 44 galaxy cluster in Sculptor) (? – Arnold Richard Klemola, 1931–2019)
- KMHK – Kontizas-Morgan-Hatzidimitiou-Kontizas (star clusters in the Large Magellanic Cloud)
- KMK – Kontizas-Metaxa-Kontizas
- KMK88 – Kontizas-Metaxa-Kontizas, 1988
- KnFs – Kinman-Feast-Lasker (planetary nebulae)
- Knott / Kn – George Knott (double stars)
- KOI – Kepler Object of Interest
- Kontizas – Evangelos Kontizas (for example: Kontizas 953 in Dorado) (in the Large Magellanic Cloud)
- Koposov – Sergey Koposov (open and globular star clusters) (for example: globular star clusters Koposov 1 and Koposov 2 in Virgo and Gemini)
- Kr – A. Kruger (double stars) (probably Karl Nikolaus Adalbert Krueger, 1832–1896)
- Kron – Gerald Kron
- Kronberger – Matthias Kronberger (globular star clusters) (for example: Kron 3 in Tucana)
- Kronberger – (for example: open star cluster Kronberger 1 at 5:28:20 / +34°46'52", aka Alicante 12, in Auriga)
- Kru – E. C. Kruger (double stars)
- Ku – Karl Friedrich Küstner (double stars)
- KUG – Kiso Survey for Ultraviolet-excess Galaxies
- Kui – Gerard P. Kuiper, 1905–73 (double stars)
- KUV – Kiso Observatory, UV-excess object

== L ==
- L / BPM – Bruce Proper Motion Survey (Luyten)
- La – Samuel Langley (double stars)
- Lac – N. de Lacaille, 1713–62 (double stars)
- Lac – Catalog of Nebulae of the Southern Sky (Lacaille)
  - Lac I – Nebulae
  - Lac II – Nebulous Star Clusters
  - Lac III – Nebulous Stars
- Lacchini – Giovanni Battista Lacchini (double stars)
- Laevens – Benjamin P. M. Laevens (globular clusters and dwarf galaxies), for example: Laevens 1 in Crater, Laevens 2 in Triangulum (Triangulum II), Laevens 3 in Delphinus.
- Lal – F. de Lalande (double stars)
- Lam – Johann von Lamont (double stars)
- λ (Lambda) – (mentioned in T. W. Webb's Celestial Objects for Common Telescopes, Volume 2: The Stars, pages 285–319: Index of Double Stars, Epoch 2000)
  - Printed examples from the 'Lambda' catalogue: λ 32 (RA 3:47.9), λ 88 (RA 7:48.9), λ 91 (RA 7:55.7), λ 96 (RA 8:12.5), λ 108 (RA 9:0.3), λ 115 (RA 9:37.1), λ 140 (RA 11:56.7), λ 176 (RA 13:20.5), λ 228 (RA 15:23.2), λ 249 (RA 15:47.6), λ 316 (RA 17:0.4), λ ? (RA 17:6.4), λ 320 (RA 17:12.2), λ 342 (RA 17:53.3). All examples are located in the southern celestial hemisphere. The 'Lambda' catalogue is related to T.J.J.See's catalogue of double stars.
- LAMOST – Large Sky Area Multi-Object Fibre Spectroscopic Telescope (Guo Shoujing Telescope)
- Latham – David Latham (for example: Latham 1 at 13:10:50 / +30°28'36" in Coma Berenices)
- Latysev – I. N. Latysev/Latyshev (Ivan Nikolaevich Latyshev) (open star clusters)
- Lau – Hans-Emil Lau (double stars)
- LBN – Lynds' Catalogue of Bright Nebulae
- Lbz – Paul Labitzke (double stars)
- LDN – Lynds' Catalogue of Dark Nebulae
- LDS – Luyten Double Star catalogue
- LCSB / LSB – Low-Contrast Sky Brightness Catalogue (cosmic structures)
- LEDA – Lyon-Meudon Extragalactic Database
- Lederman – Guillaume Le Gentil (telescopic asterisms)
- Le Gentil – (for example: Le Gentil 3 in Cygnus, at 21:08 / +51°40') (dark nebula)
- Leon – Frederick C. Leonard (double stars)
- Le-Wa – Levy-Wallach
- Lewis – Thomas Lewis (double stars)
- LFT – Luyten Five-Tenths catalogue
- LG11 – Lépine & Gaidos 2011, bright M dwarfs
- LGG – Lyons Groups of Galaxies
- LGGS – Local Group Galaxy Survey
- LGS – (for example: dwarf galaxy LGS 3 in Pisces, also known as the Pisces Dwarf)
- LH – Lucke-Hodge (OB associations in the Large Magellanic Cloud)
- LHA – Lamont-Hussey Alpha
- LHS – Luyten Half-Second catalogue
- Liller (globular star clusters) (for example: Liller 1 in Scorpius)
- LISC – Zhongmu Li team's star clusters
- LMC-SMP – Large Magellanic Cloud, Sanduleak-McConnell-Philip
- Lo – Lars Olof Lodén (open star clusters)
- Lo – Longmore
- Loiano – (for example: open star cluster Loiano 1 at 19:58:21 / +32°32'42" in Cygnus)
- Lorenzin – Tomm Lorenzin (telescopic asterisms)
- LoTr – Longmore-Tritton (planetary nebulae)
- LP – Luyten-Palomar Survey
- LP – Lei Liu and Xiaoying Pang's star cluster catalogue
- LPM – Luyten Proper-Motion Catalogue
- LPO – La Plata Observatory, Argentina
- LS – either of two "Luminous Stars" catalogues; see LSN and LSS, below
- LS – Lensed Star (LS 1 = 'Icarus' in Leo) (see MACS J1149 Lensed Star 1)
- LSA – Lundstrom-Stenholm-Acker (planetary nebulae)
- LSN – Luminous Stars in the Northern Milky Way
- LSPM – LSPM catalog – Lépine-Shara Proper Motion catalog
- LSR – Lepine-Shara-Rich catalogue
- LSS – Luminous Stars in the Southern Milky Way
- LTT – Luyten Two-Tenths catalogue
- Luginbuhl-Skiff – (for example: open star cluster Luginbuhl-Skiff 1 at 6:14:48 / +12°52'24", slightly east of open star cluster NGC 2194 in Orion)
- Luhman – Kevin Luhman (for example: Luhman 16 in Vela)
- Luy – Willem Jacob Luyten (double stars)
- Lv – Francis Preserved Leavenworth (double stars)
- LV – Local Volume Catalogue (galaxies)
- Ly – Gösta Lyngå (open star clusters)

== M ==
- M – Catalog of Nebulae and Star Clusters (Messier object)
- M – Rudolph Minkowski (planetary nebulae)
- [M2002] LMC – Massey, 2002 LMC (luminous stars)
- [M2002] SMC – Massey, 2002 SMC (luminous stars)
- Ma – Johann Heinrich von Mädler (double stars)
- Mac – Thomas Maclear (double stars)
- MacConnell – Darrell Jack MacConnell (planetary nebulae)
- MACS – Massive Cluster Survey or Magellanic Catalogue of Stars
- MACHO – MACHO Project lensing events (Massive Compact Halo Object)
  - MACHO-LMC – MACHO Project Large Magellanic Cloud Microlensing
  - MACHO-SML – MACHO Project Small Magellanic Cloud Microlensing
- Maehara – Hiroyuki Maehara (planetary nebulae)
- Maffei – Paolo Maffei (for example: galaxies Maffei 1 and Maffei 2 in Cassiopeia)
- Mailyan – (for example: Mailyan 44, aka Holmberg I / DDO 63 / UGC 5139, at 9h 40.5m / +71° 11' in Ursa Major)
- Malin – David Malin (for example: the largest galaxy known; Malin 1 in Coma Berenices)
- Mamajek – Eric Mamajek (open star clusters) (for example: Mamajek 1 at 8:42:06 / -79°01'38" in Chamaeleon, also known as η Chamaeleontis cluster or η Chamaeleontis association)
- Markov (telescopic asterisms) (for example: Markov 1 in Hercules)
- MAXI – Monitor of All-sky X-ray Image
- Mayall – Nicholas Mayall (for example: globular star cluster Mayall II orbiting Messier 31, the Andromeda galaxy)
- Mayer (open star clusters)
- McC – McCormick Observatory Catalog
- MCG – Morphological Catalogue of Galaxies
- MCW – Morgan, Code, and Whitford
- Me – Paul W. Merrill (planetary nebulae)
- Mel – Melotte Catalogue of open star clusters (Philibert Jacques Melotte)
- Mercer (for example: globular star cluster Mercer 3 in Scutum)
- MGC (globular star clusters) (for example: MGC1 in Pisces)
- MGP – Manchado-Garcia-Lario-Pottasch (planetary nebulae)
- MGRO – Milagro Gamma-Ray Observatory Catalogue (Gamma-ray sources)
- Mh – Ormsby M. Mitchel (double stars) (probably John Anthony Miller)
- Mil – J.A. Miller (double stars)
- Miller (open star clusters) (for example: Miller 1 at 9:25:42 / -53°14'00", near the variable star GL Velorum, in Vela)
- Milb – William Milburn (double stars)
- MlbO – Melbourne Observatory, Australia (double stars)
- Mlf – Frank Muller (double stars)
- Mlr – Paul Muller (double stars)
- MN – Mina-Nicholls (stars, like MN 102)
- Moffat – Anthony Moffat (open star clusters) (for example: Moffat 1 at 16:01:30 / -54°07'00" in Norma)
- Moitinho – André Moitinho de Almeida (open star clusters) (for example: Moitinho 1 at 8:19:17 / -45°12'30", southwest of the Gum Nebula, in Vela)
- MoM – Mirage or Miracle Survey (Example: MoM-z14)
- MPC – Minor Planet Circulars contain astrometric observations, orbits and ephemerides of both minor planets and comets
- Mrk – Benjamin "Benik" Egishevitch Markarian (open star clusters and galaxies; the Markarian galaxies)
- MRMGL – Manchado-Riera-Mampaso-Garcia-Lario (planetary nebulae)
- MSH – Mills, Slee, Hill – Catalog of Radio Sources
- Muzzio – Juan Carlos Muzzio (open star clusters) (for example: Muzzio 1 at 8:57:12 / -47°46'00" in Vela)
- MW – Mandel-Wilson Catalogue of Unexplored Nebulae, not in SIMBAD yet
- MWC – Mount Wilson Observatory Catalogue (1933) Class O, B and A stars with bright hydrogen lines
- MWSC – Milky Way Star Clusters Catalogue
- MWP – Motch-Werner-Pakull (planetary nebulae)
- MyCn – Mayall-Cannon (planetary nebulae)
- Mz – Donald Howard Menzel (planetary nebulae)

== N ==
- N – (for example: N 164 nebula in Dorado)
- Na – Jason John Nassau (planetary nebulae)
- Naillon – (telescopic asterisms) (source: Bruno S. Alessi's list)
- N30 – Catalog of 5,268 Standard Stars Based on the Normal System N30
- Neckerman (telescopic asterisms) (for example: Neckerman 1, aka Kemble 2 "Little Cassiopeia").
- NED – NASA/IPAC Extragalactic Database
- Negueruela – (Ignacio Negueruela)
- NeVe – Neckel-Vehrenberg (planetary nebulae)
- New – ? (galaxies)
  - New 1 in Cetus (source: The Deep-Sky Field Guide to Uranometria 2000.0, Cragin-Lucyk-Rappaport, chart 262).
  - New 5 in Sagittarius (thus mentioned on chart 22 of Wil Tirion's Sky-Atlas 2000.0, mentioned as ESO 285-G7 on charts 411 and 412 in Uranometria 2000.0 Volume 2, 1987 edition).
  - New 6 in Indus (chart 23 in Tirion's Sky-Atlas 2000.0, chart 413 in the 1987 edition of Uranometria 2000.0, Volume 2) (as ESO 287-G13)
- NGC – New General Catalogue
- NGTS – Next-Generation Transit Survey (extrasolar planets)
- NHICAT – Northern HIPASS Catalog
- NLTT – New Luyten Two-Tenths Catalogue
- NOMAD – The Naval Observatory Merged Astrometric Dataset (NOMAD)
- NRL – Naval Research Laboratory X-Ray
- NStars – Nearby Stars Database
- NSV – New Catalogue of Suspected Variable Stars
- NVSS – NRAO VLA Sky Survey (radio astronomical objects)
- NZO – New Zealand Observatory (double stars)

== O ==
- O – O'Neal (open star clusters)
- OCL – Open Clusters
- OCSN – Open Clusters of Solar Neighborhood Catalogue
- OEC – Open Exoplanet Catalogue
- OGC – Ogle Galaxy Catalogue (Example: OGC 94)
- OGLE – Optical Gravitational Lensing Experiment
- Ol – Charles Pollard Olivier (double stars)
- Opik – Ernst J. Opik (double stars)
- ORC – Odd radio circles
- OSC – Open Supernova Catalog
- OΣ – Otto Struve, Pulkovo Catalogue, 1843 (double stars)
- OΣΣ – Otto Struve, Pulkovo Catalogue Supplement, 1843 (double stars)
- OSS – Ohio Sky Survey
- OTC – Open TDE Catalog
- OTS – Oasa-Tamura-Sugitani (young stellar objects)
- Ou – Nicolas Outters (for example: Ou 4, the 'Squid Nebula' in Cepheus) (see APOD – Astronomy Picture Of the Day – July 18, 2014).

== P ==
- P – Charles Dillon Perrine (double stars)
- PACWB – Catalogue of Particle-Accelerating Colliding-Wind Binaries
- PAL – Palomar Globular Clusters (15 globular clusters discovered on the Palomar Observatory Sky Survey plates)
- Par – Parkhurst (double stars)
- Parenago – Parenago Catalogue of Stars in Orion Nebula
- Parsamian / Parsamyan – Elma Parsamyan (comentary nebulae)
- PaŽib – Patchick-Žiberg (planetary nebula candidates, Example: PaŽib 1 in Auriga)
- PB – Peimbert-Batiz (planetary nebulae)
- PBOZ – Pottasch-Bignell-Olling-Zijlstra (planetary nebulae)
- PC – Peimbert-Costero (planetary nebulae)
- PCCS – Planck Catalogue of Compact Sources
  - PCCS2 – Planck Catalogue of Compact Sources, Release 2
  - PCCS2E – Planck Catalogue of Compact Sources, Release 2 Extended Zone
- Pe – Luboš Perek (planetary nebulae)
- Perr – Henri Joseph Anastase Perrotin (double stars)
- Perry – Perry (double stars)
- Pfl – Jörg Pfleiderer
- PG – Palomar-Green (catalogue of ultraviolet excess stellar objects)
- PGC – Principal Galaxies Catalogue
- PGCC – Planck Catalogue of Cold Clumps (cold sources)
- PH – Planet Hunters
- PHL – Palomar-Haro-Luyten catalogue
- PHR – Parker-Hartley-Russell (planetary nebulae)
- Pi – Pismis (Paris Pişmiş, 1911–1999) (catalogue of 22 open star clusters and 2 globular star clusters)
- PK – Catalogue of galactic planetary nebulae (Perek-Kohoutek)
- PKS – Parkes Catalogue of Radio Sources
- Platais – Imants Platais' catalogue of open star clusters
- PLCK – Planck (Deep Sky Objects)
  - PLCKESZ – Planck Early Sunyaev-Zeldovich Catalogue
- Plq – Émile Paloque (double stars)
- PLX – General Catalogue of Trigonometric Stellar Parallaxes and Supplement (Jenkins, Yale University)
- PM – Andrea Preite-Martinez (planetary nebulae)
- PM – Proper Motion (Eggen)
- PMMR – Prévot-Martin-Maurice-Rebeirot-Rousseau (stars in the Small Magellanic Cloud)
- PMC – Tokyo Photoelectric Meridian Circle Catalog
- PN – See PNG
- PNG – Strasbourg-ESO Catalogue of Galactic Planetary Nebulae
- Pol – Pollock (double stars)
- Pot – Yann Pothier (open clusters and asterisms)
- Pou – Pourteau (double stars)
- Pozzo – Stefania Pozzo (open clusters)
- PPA – Peynaud-Parker-Acker (planetary nebulae)
- PPM – Positions and Proper Motions Star Catalogues
- Pri – Pritchett (double stars)
- PRIMER-COS – Public Release Imaging for Extragalactic Research Cosmic Evolution Survey (Galaxies)
- PRIMER-UDS – Public Release Imaging for Extragalactic Research Ultra Deep Survey (Galaxies)
- PrO – Perth Observatory, Australia (double stars)
- PRTM – Peña Ruiz, Torres-Peimbert, and Mermilliod (planetary nebulae)
- Prz – Przbyllok (double stars)
- Ps – Francis G. Pease (planetary nebulae) (for example: Pease 1 in the globular cluster Messier 15, Pegasus)
- PSR – Pulsating Source of Radio (pulsars)
- PSZ – Planck Sunyaev-Zeldovich Catalogue (galaxy clusters)
  - PSZ1 – First Planck Sunyaev-Zeldovich Catalogue
  - PSZ2 – Second Planck Sunyaev-Zeldovich Catalogue
  - PSZ-MCMF – Planck Sunyaev-Zeldovich Multi-Component Mixture Finder Catalogue
  - PSZ Meta – Planck Sunyaev-Zeldovich Meta Catalogue
- PTFO – Palomar Transient Factory
- Ptt – Pettit (double stars)
- Pu – Alois Purgathofer (planetary nebulae)
- PuWe – Purgathofer-Weinberger (planetary nebulae)
- PWM – Pfleiderer-Weinberger-Mross (Jörg Pfleiderer, Ronald Weinberger, and Reinhold Mross)
- Pz – Giuseppe Piazzi (double stars)

== Q ==
- Q (?) – (for example: galaxy Q 6188 at 0:48.6 / -12:44 in Cetus) (mentioned on charts 261 / 262 in Uranometria 2000.0 Volume 2, 1987 edition) (according to Wolfgang Steinicke and Richard Jakiel of the book Galaxies and How to Observe Them, this galaxy (Q 6188) is also catalogued as Mrk 960 and PGC 2845)
- QES – QATAR Exoplanet Survey
- QSO – Revised and Updated Catalog of Quasi-stellar Objects
- QZM – (for example: QZM 2 at galactic coordinates 78.12 / +3.63) (J2000 – 20:14:26 / +41°13'28") (QZM 2 = Froebrich 116, = SUH 151)

== R ==
- R – Radcliffe Observatory (RMC – Radcliffe Observatory Magellanic Clouds Catalogue)
- R – Rose (Rose Catalogue of Southern Clusters of Galaxies)
- R – Henry Chamberlain Russell (double stars)
- Raab – (open star clusters)
- RAFGL – Revised Air Force Geophysical Laboratory (four color infrared sky survey)
- Ramakers – Bruno Ramakers (Asterisms)
- Raymond – (telescopic asterisms)
- RBC – Revised Bologna Catalogue (for example: globular cluster RBC EXT8 in Messier 31; the Andromeda Galaxy)
- RBS – Rosat Bright Survey (bright X-ray sources)
- RC – Reference Catalogue
  - RC2 – Reference Catalogue, 2nd edition
  - RC3 – Reference Catalogue, 3rd edition
- RCS – Red-Sequence Cluster Survey
  - RCS1 – Red-Sequence Cluster Survey 1
  - RCS2 – Red-Sequence Cluster Survey 2
- RCW – Rodgers-Campbell-Whiteoak, a catalogue of Hα-emission regions in the southern Milky Way
- RECONS – Research Consortium on Nearby Stars
- Reiland – Tom Reiland (for example: open star cluster Reiland 1 at 23:04:45 / +60°04'40")
- Reinmuth – Karl Wilhelm Reinmuth (galaxies) (for example: Reinmuth 80 in Virgo) (NGC 4517A)
- Renou – Alexandre Renou (telescopic asterisms)
- Reyle-Robin – (open star clusters, I.R.)
- RGZ – Radio Galaxy Zoo Catalogue
- Richaud – Richaud, 1633–93 (double stars)
- Riddle – (open star clusters / telescopic asterisms)
- RLGC – Ryu-Lee Globular Cluster
- Rmk – Carl Ludwig Christian Rümker (double stars)
- RMM – (for example: open star cluster RMM 1 at 12:12:20 / -63°15'31")
- RNGC – Revised New General Catalogue
- Ro – Curt Roslund (open star clusters)
- Roberts – (protoplanetary nebulae)
- Roe – Edward Drake Roe, 1859–1929 (double stars)
- Roman-Lopes – (open star clusters, I.R.)
- Ross – Ross Catalogue of New Proper Motion Stars (Frank Elmore Ross)
- ROT – Catalogue of Rotational Velocities of the Stars
- RPZM – Ratag, Pottasch, Zijlstra, and Menzies (planetary nebulae)
- RSA – Revised Shapley-Ames Catalogue
- RSGC / RSG – Red Super Giant Cluster (for example: RSGC 3 at 18:45:20 / -3°24'43")
- RST – Catalogue of southern double stars (Richard Alfred Rossiter, 1886–1977)
- Ru – Jaroslav Ruprecht (open star clusters)
- RX – ROSAT observations

== S ==
- S – James South (double stars)
- Sa – Nicholas Sanduleak (planetary nebulae)
- SA – Aage Sandqvist (dark nebulae) (for example: Sandqvist 169 near Alpha Centauri)
- SACS – Second Astrolabe Catalogue of Santiago
- SAI – Sternberg Astronomical Institute
- Saloranta – Jaakko Saloranta (telescopic asterisms)
- SAO – Smithsonian Astrophysical Observatory Star Catalog
- Saurer – Walter Saurer (for example: the open star cluster Saurer 1 at 7:18:18 / +1°53'12" in Canis Minor)
- SaWe – Sanduleak-Weinberger (planetary nebulae)
- SAX – Satellite per Astronomia a raggi X (BeppoSAX satellite)
- SB – Sylvie Beaulieu (planetary nebulae)
- SC – Slough catalogue ("Observations of Nebulae and Clusters of Stars, made at Slough, with a Twenty-Feet Reflector, between the years 1825 and 1833" by John Herschel; 2306 entries)
- Schb – John Martin Schaeberle (double stars)
- Schj – Hans Schjellerup (double stars)
- Schoenberg – (for example: Schoenberg 205-6 at 6:37.1 / +10°21')
- Schuster – (for example: open star cluster Schuster 1 at 10:04:39 / -55°51'29" in Vela)
- SCM – Schwarz, Corradi, and Melnick catalogue.
- Scott – James L. Scott (double stars)
- SCR – SuperCOSMOS-RECONS
- SD – Secret Deep catalogue by Stephen James O'Meara
- SDSO – Strottner-Drechsler-Sainty Object (Example: SDSO-1)
- SDSS – Sloan Digital Sky Survey
  - SDSSp – Sloan Digital Sky Survey, provisory
  - SHOC – Strong Emission Line H II Galaxies in the Sloan Digital Sky Survey. I. Catalog of DR1 Objects with Oxygen Abundances from Te Measurements.
  - 1SDSS – Sloan Digital Sky Survey, 1st release
  - 2SDSS – reserved by the Sloan Digital Sky Survey for future release. The name is reserved to the IAU, but does not exist yet.
  - 3SDSS – reserved by the Sloan Digital Sky Survey for future release. The name is reserved to the IAU, but does not exist yet.
- Se – Father Angelo Secchi (double stars)
- Se – José Luis Sérsic (selected list of peculiar galaxies and groups of galaxies)
- See – T.J.J. See (Thomas Jefferson Jackson See, 1866–1962) (double stars) (related to the 'Lambda' catalogue which is mentioned in T.W.Webb's Celestial Objects for Common Telescopes, Volume 2: The Stars, pages 285–319: Index of Double Stars, Epoch 2000).
- SEGUE – Sloan Extension for Galactic Understanding and Exploration (for example: galaxies Segue 1 in Leo, Segue 2 in Aries, and Segue 3 in Pegasus)
- Sei – Julius Scheiner (double stars)
- SG – Southern Gems catalogue by Stephen James O'Meara
- SGR – Soft Gamma Repeater
- SGS – Supergiant Shell (Example: SGS 5 in the Large Magellanic Cloud)
- Sh / S – Sharpless catalog (Sh 1 (1953) & Sh 2 (1959))
- Sh – David Sher (open star clusters) (for example: Sher 25; also Sher 1 at 11:01:04 / -60°14'00" in Carina)
- S, h – James South / John Herschel (joint 1824 catalogue of double stars)
- Shk – Romela Karapet Shakhbazian (compact groups of galaxies) (for example: Shakhbazian 1 (the 'Russian Cluster') at 10:54.8 / +40°28' in Ursa Major)
- Shorlin – Stephen L. S. Shorlin (for example: open star cluster Shorlin 1 at 11:05:46 / -61°13'48" in Carina)
- SHV – Shuan Hughes Variable (long-period red variable stars)
- ShWi – Shaw-Wirth (planetary nebulae)
- Simeis – Simeis Observatory (for example: supernova remnant Simeis 147 / Sh2-240 in Taurus, also known as the 'Spaghetti Nebula')
- SIMP – Sondage Infrarouge de Mouvement Propre (French: Infrared Proper Motion Survey), an all-sky survey in the near-infrared initiated in 2005 with the CPARIR camera.
- Sinnott – (multiple star systems)
- SIPS – Southern Infrared Proper Motion Survey
- Siv – Jean-Pierre Sivan (H II regions)
- Sk – Skinner (double stars)
- Sk – Sanduleak (stars in the Large Magellanic Cloud)
- SkKM – Sanduleak-MacConnell-Philip (red supergiant stars in the Magellanic Clouds)
- Skiff – Brian A. Skiff
- SL – Sandqvist-Lindroos (dark nebulae)
- Slo – Auke Slotegraaf
- Slr – Richard Pickering Sellors (double stars)
- SMACS – Southern Massive Cluster Survey
- Smart – William Marshall Smart (double stars)
- SMC-MG – Small Magellanic Cloud, Morgan-Good
- SMC-SMP – Small Magellanic Cloud, Sanduleak-McConnell-Philip
- Smyth – William Henry Smyth (1788–1865) (double stars)
- Sn – C. Donald Shane (planetary nebulae)
- SP77 – Sanduleak-Philip, 1977 (stars in the LMC and SMC)
- Sp – Giovanni Schiaparelli (double stars)
- Sp – Harlow Shapley (planetary nebulae)
- Spano – (telescopic asterisms)
- SPF2 – Second Cat of Fundamental Stars
- SPF3 – Third Santiago-Pulkovo Fundamental Star Catalogue
- SPOCS – Spectroscopic Properties of Cool Stars
- SPRC – Sloan-based Polar Ring Catalogue
- SRS – Southern Reference Star Catalog
- SS – Sadler and Sharp (survey of E-type and S0-type galaxies)
- SS – Sanduleak-Stephenson (for example: SS 433 in Aquila)
- SSSPM – SuperCOSMOS Sky Survey
- SSTc2d – Spitzer Space Telescope c2d Legacy Source
- SSTDUSTG – DUSTiNGS (Dust in Nearby Galaxies with Spitzer)
- St – Carl L. Stearns (double stars)
- StDr – Strottner‐Drechsler (planetary nebula candidates)
- Ste – Stephenson (open star clusters)
- Stein – Johan Stein (double stars)
- Steine – (open star clusters)
- STF (Σ) – Friedrich Georg Wilhelm von Struve, aka 'Struve the Father' (double stars)
  - ΣI – W. Struve, First Supplement (double stars)
  - ΣII – W. Struve, Second Supplement (double stars)
- StM – Charles Bruce Stephenson (late M stars)
- St / Stock – Jürgen Stock (open star clusters) (Stock 1 and 2 in, Stock 3 to 23 in, Stock 24 in)
- Stone – Ormond Stone (double stars)
- Streicher – Magda Brits Streicher (telescopic asterisms)
- Stromlo – (for example: Stromlo 2 in Monoceros and Canis Major, at IC 2177; the 'Eagle Nebula')
- StWr – Stock-Wróblewski (planetary nebulae) (Jürgen Stock and Herbert Wróblewski)
- Sw – Swift (double stars)
- SWEEPS – Sagittarius Window Eclipsing Extrasolar Planet Search
- Swift – Swift (for example: Swift J1745-26 in Sagittarius) (stellar-mass black hole)
- SwSt – Swings-Struve (planetary nebulae) (Pol Swings and Otto Struve)
- SyO – Sydney Observatory, Australia (double stars)

== T ==
- Ta – Tarrant (double stars)
- TAC – Twin Astrograph Catalog
- Tc – A. David Thackeray (planetary nebulae)
- TD1 – Catalogue of stellar UV fluxes (TD1 satellite)
- TDC – Thompson-Djorgopvski-Carvalho (planetary nebulae) (David J. Thompson, S. George Djorgovski, Reinaldo R. de Carvalho)
- TeJu – Terzan-Ju (Agop Terzan and Kang Hyang Ju)
- Terz N – Agop Terzan Nebulous Catalogue
- Terzan – Agop Terzan Catalogue of Globular Star Clusters (11 objects)
- TGU – Tokyo Gakugei University Catalogue (dark nebulae)
  - TGU H – Tokyo Gakugei University Catalogue, Dark cloud segment
  - TGU P – Tokyo Gakugei University Catalogue, Dark cloud system
- THA – TH-alpha catalogue of emission line stars in the Eta Carinae nebula region
- Theia – Marina Kounkel and Kevin Covey's stellar cluster list
- TIC – TESS Input Catalog
- TIC – Tycho Input Catalog
- TOI – TESS Object of Interest
- Tom – Clyde Tombaugh (open star clusters)
- Ton – Tonantzintla Catalogue (Blue stars and quasars due to their similar appearance to blue stars)
- TPK – Teutsch-Patchick-Kronberger (asterisms) (for example: Teutsch-Patchick-Kronberger 1 at 23:39.3 / +47°30', north of the former constellation Honores Friderici in Andromeda)
- TRAPPIST – Transiting Planets and Planetesimals Small Telescope
- TrES – Trans-Atlantic Exoplanet Survey
  - TrES-And0 – TrES of planetary candidate in the Andromeda constellation
- TVLM – Tinney's Very Low Mass Catalogue
- TYC – Tycho Catalogue
  - TYC2 – Tycho-2 Catalogue
- Tr / Trumpler – Robert Julius Trumpler's open cluster list, published in Preliminary results on the distances, dimensions and space distribution of open star clusters
- Tu – Tucker (double stars)
- Turner – David G. Turner (?) (open star clusters) (for example: Turner 9 at and near the variable star SU Cygni, aka 'SU Cygni cluster')

== U ==
- UBC – University of Barcelona Catalogue (open clusters)
- UBV – Photoelectric Catalogue, magnitude and color of stars in UBV (Blanco et al. 1968)
- UBV M – UBV Photoelectric Photometry Catalogue (Mermilliod 1987)
- UCAC – USNO CCD Astrograph Catalog (UCAC1, UCAC2, UCAC3 & UCAC4)
- UFMG – Universidade Federal de Minas Gerais Catalogue (open clusters)
- UGC – Uppsala General Catalogue (galaxies)
- UGCA – Uppsala Selected non-UGC Galaxies
- UKS – United Kingdom Schmidt (globular star clusters)
- ULAS – UKIDDS Large Area Survey (quasars)
- UNCOVER – Ultradeep Nirspec and Nircam Observations before the Epoch of Reionization (Galaxies behind galaxy cluster Abell 2744)
- Up – Arthur R. Upgren (open star clusters) (only one object in this catalogue? Upgren 1) (probably Arthur R. Upgren, 1933–2017)
- Up – Winslow Upton (double stars)
- UPK – Ulsan Pusan Korea (open clusters)
- USNO – U.S. Naval Observatory
  - USNO-A1.0— U.S. Naval Observatory, A1.0 catalogue
  - USNO-A2.0 – U.S. Naval Observatory, A2.0 catalogue
  - USNO-B1.0 – U.S. Naval Observatory, B1.0 catalogue
- uvby98 – uvbyβ photoelectric photometric catalogue, by B. Hauck, M. Mermilliod, Astron. Astrophys., Suppl. Ser., 129, 431–433 (1998)

== V ==
- vB – Van Biesbroeck's star catalog, variant, "VB"
- VBRC – van den Bergh-Racine (Sidney van den Bergh and René Racine) (planetary nebulae)
- VCC – Virgo Cluster Catalog
- Vd – Peter O. Vandervoort (planetary nebulae)
- VdB – Van den Bergh Catalog from Van den Bergh (catalogue of reflection nebulae)
  - VdB-H – Van den Bergh-Herbst (open star clusters)
  - VdB-Ha – Van den Bergh-Hagen (open star clusters)
- VFTS – VLT-FLAMES Tarantula Survey
- Vou – J. G. E. G. Voûte (double stars)
- VPHAS+ – The VST Photometric Hα Survey of the Southern Galactic Plane and Bulge
- VV – Vorontsov-Vel'yaminov Interacting Galaxies (Boris Aleksandrovich Vorontsov-Vel'yaminov)
- VVV Survey – Vista Variables in the Via Lactea (Latin for Milky Way)
  - VVV-CL – (open star clusters, I.R.)
- Vy – Vyssotsky (planetary nebulae) (Alexander Vyssotsky)

== W ==
- W – Radiosource (Westerhout)
- W20 – Washington 20 Catalog
- [W60] – Westerlund, 1960 (stars in the Large Magellanic Cloud, like [W60] B90)
- Wa / Ward – Isaac William Ward (double stars)
- Wa – Waterloo (open star clusters)
- WASP – Wide Angle Search for Planets
- WASP0-TR – Wide Angle Search for Planets, Transit
- WDS – Washington Double Star Catalog
- We – Weinberger (planetary nebulae) (Ronald Weinberger)
- We – Westerlund (open star clusters) (Bengt Westerlund, 1921–2008)
- Webb – Thomas William Webb (double stars)
- WeBo – Webbink-Bond (planetary nebulae) (Ronald F. Webbink and Howard E. Bond)
- WeDe – Weinberger-Dengel (planetary nebulae) (Ronald Weinberger and Johann Dengel/Dengl)
- Weisse – Maximilian von Weisse (double stars)
- WeSa – Weinberger-Sabbadin (planetary nebulae)
- Wg – Ruric W. Wrigley (double stars)
- Whiting – Alan B. Whiting (globular star clusters) (for example: Whiting 1 at 2h 02m / -3° 15' in Cetus)
- WHL – Wen-Han-Liu (galaxy clusters)
- WhMe – Whitelock-Menzies
- Willman – Beth Willman (for example: ultra low-luminosity dwarf galaxy or star cluster Willman 1 in Ursa Major)
- Wils – Raymond H. Wilson, Jr. (double stars)
- Win – Winlock (double stars)
- Wirtz – Carl Wilhelm Wirtz (double stars)
- WISE – Wide-field Infrared Survey Explorer
- WISEA – AllWISE Source Catalog
- WISEP – Wide-field Infrared Survey Explorer Preliminary Release Source Catalog
- WNC / Winn – Winnecke Catalogue of Double Stars
- WNO – Washington Observations (double stars) (U.S. Naval Observatory, Washington D.C.)
- Wo – Woolley Nearby Star Catalogue
- WOH G – Westerlund-Olander-Hedin First Catalogue (Stars in the Large Magellanic Cloud)
- WOH S – Westerlund-Olander-Hedin Second Catalogue (Stars in the Large Magellanic Cloud)
- Wolf – Catalogue of High Proper Motion Stars (Wolf)
- Worley – Charles Edmund Worley (double stars)
- WR – Catalog of Galactic Wolf–Rayet stars (Charles Wolf / Georges Rayet)
- Wray – James David Wray (emission-line objects, like Wray 17-96)

== X ==
- XBS – XMM-Newton, Bright Source
- XBSS – XMM-Newton Bright Serendipitous Survey
- XDCP – X-ray Distant Cluster Project
- XEST – XMM-Newton Extended Survey of the Taurus Molecular
  - XEST-OM – XEST, Optical/UV Monitor
- XLSSC – X-ray Large Scale Structure Survey Catalogue
- XMM-Newton Serendipitous Source Catalogues:
  - 1XMM – First XMM-Newton Serendipitous Catalogue
  - 2XMM – Second XMM-Newton Serendipitous Catalogue
  - 3XMM – Third XMM-Newton Serendipitous Catalogue
  - 4XMM – Fourth XMM-Newton Serendipitous Catalogue
  - 5XMM – Fifth XMM-Newton Serendipitous Catalogue
- XMMXCS – XMM Cluster Survey Catalogue
- XO – XO-Project (XO telescope) (search for extrasolar planets)
- XRF – X-Ray Flash
- XTE – X-ray Timing Explorer
- XZ – XZ Catalogue of Zodiacal Stars (Richard Schmidt / Tom Van Flandern, 1977, U.S. Naval Observatory)

== Y ==
- Y – Young (double stars)
- YBS – Yale Bright Star Catalogue
- Y-C – Yale Columbia Observatory (planetary nebulae)
- YLW – Young-Lada-Wilking (X-ray sources)
- YM – Yerkes-McDonald (H II regions, like YM 29)
- YZ – Yale Observatory Zone Catalog

== Z ==
- Z – Fritz Zwicky, Catalogue of galaxies and of clusters of galaxies
  - I Zw – First Zwicky Volume
  - II Zw – Second Zwicky Volume
  - III Zw – Third Zwicky Volume
  - IV Zw – Fourth Zwicky Volume
  - V Zw – Fifth Zwicky Volume
  - VI Zw – Sixth Zwicky Volume
  - VII Zw – Seventh Zwicky Volume
  - ZwCl – Zwicky Cluster Catalogue
  - UZC – Updated Zwicky Catalogue
- ZC – Robertson's Zodiacal Catalogue (James Robertson's catalogue of 3539 zodiacal stars brighter than 9th magnitude)
- Zij – Islamic astronomical books that tabulates parameters used for astronomical calculations of the positions of the Sun, Moon, stars, and planets
  - Book of Fixed Stars
  - Tables of Toledo
  - Zij-i Ilkhani
  - Zij-i-Sultani

== See also ==
- Lists of astronomical objects
- List of astronomical objects named after people
- List of astronomy acronyms
- List of common astronomy symbols
- Glossary of astronomy
- IAU designated constellations

== Other ==
- VizieR
- CDS Service for Astronomical Catalogues
- Dictionary of Nomenclature of Celestial Objects
