= P Cygni =

Variable star in the constellation Cygnus

- Location of P Cygni (circled in red)

Observation data Epoch J2000 Equinox ICRS
- Constellation: Cygnus
- Right ascension: 20^{h} 17^{m} 47.2020^{s}
- Declination: +38° 01′ 58.549″
- Apparent magnitude (V): 4.82 (3 to 6)

Characteristics
- Evolutionary stage: Blue Hypergiant
- Spectral type: B1-2 Ia-0ep (B1 Iapeq)
- U−B color index: −0.58
- B−V color index: +0.42
- Variable type: LBV

Astrometry
Radial velocity (R_{v})	−8.9 km/s
Proper motion (μ)	RA: −3.723 mas/yr Dec.: −6.798 mas/yr
Parallax (π)	0.6251±0.0729 mas
Distance	5,300±590 ly (1,610±180 pc)
Absolute magnitude (M_{V})	−7.9

Details
Mass	37 M_{☉}
Radius	58–90 R_{☉}
Luminosity	500,000 to 790,000 L_{☉}
Surface gravity (log g)	2.25 cgs
Temperature	18,500 to 20,500 K
Rotational velocity (v sin i)	35 km/s

Other designations
- Nova Cyg 1600, P Cyg, 34 Cyg, AAVSO 2014+37A, AG+37°1953, BD+37°3871, GC 28218, HD 193237, HIP 100044, HR 7763, SAO 69773, PPM 84645, PLX 4837, TYC 3151-3442-1, GCRV 12673, GSC 03151-03442, 2MASS J20174719+3801585, JP11 3218, TD1 26474, ALS 11097, MCW 849, Hen 3-1871, CEL 5017, RAFGL 5493S, ROT 2959

Database references
SIMBAD	data

P Cygni (34 Cygni) is a variable star in the constellation Cygnus. The designation "P" was originally assigned by Johann Bayer in Uranometria as a nova. Located about 5,300 light-years (1,560 parsecs) from Earth, it is a hypergiant luminous blue variable (LBV) star of spectral type B1-2 Ia-0ep that is one of the most luminous stars in the Milky Way.

== Visibility ==
The star is located about 5,000 to 6,000 light-years (1,500–1,800 parsecs) from Earth. Despite this vast distance, it is visible to the naked eye in suitable dark sky locations. It was unknown until the end of the 16th century, when it suddenly brightened to 3rd magnitude. It was first observed on 18 August (Gregorian) 1600 by Willem Janszoon Blaeu, a Dutch astronomer, mathematician and globe-maker. Bayer's atlas of 1603 assigned it the miscellaneous label P and the name has stuck ever since. After six years the star faded slowly, dropping below naked-eye visibility in 1626. It brightened again in 1655, but had faded by 1662. Another outburst took place in 1665; this was followed by numerous fluctuations. Since 1715 P Cygni has been a fifth magnitude star, with only minor fluctuations in brightness. Today it has a magnitude of 4.8, irregularly variable by a few hundredths of a magnitude on a scale of days. The visual brightness is increasing by about 0.15 magnitude per century, attributed to a slow decrease in temperature at constant luminosity.

P Cygni has been called a "permanent nova" because of spectral similarities and the obvious outflow of material, and was once treated with novae as an eruptive variable; however, its behaviour is no longer thought to involve the same processes associated with true novae. Christiaan Huygens in the 17th century called it the "Revenante of the Swan", in reference to its brightness variations at the time.

== Luminous blue variable ==
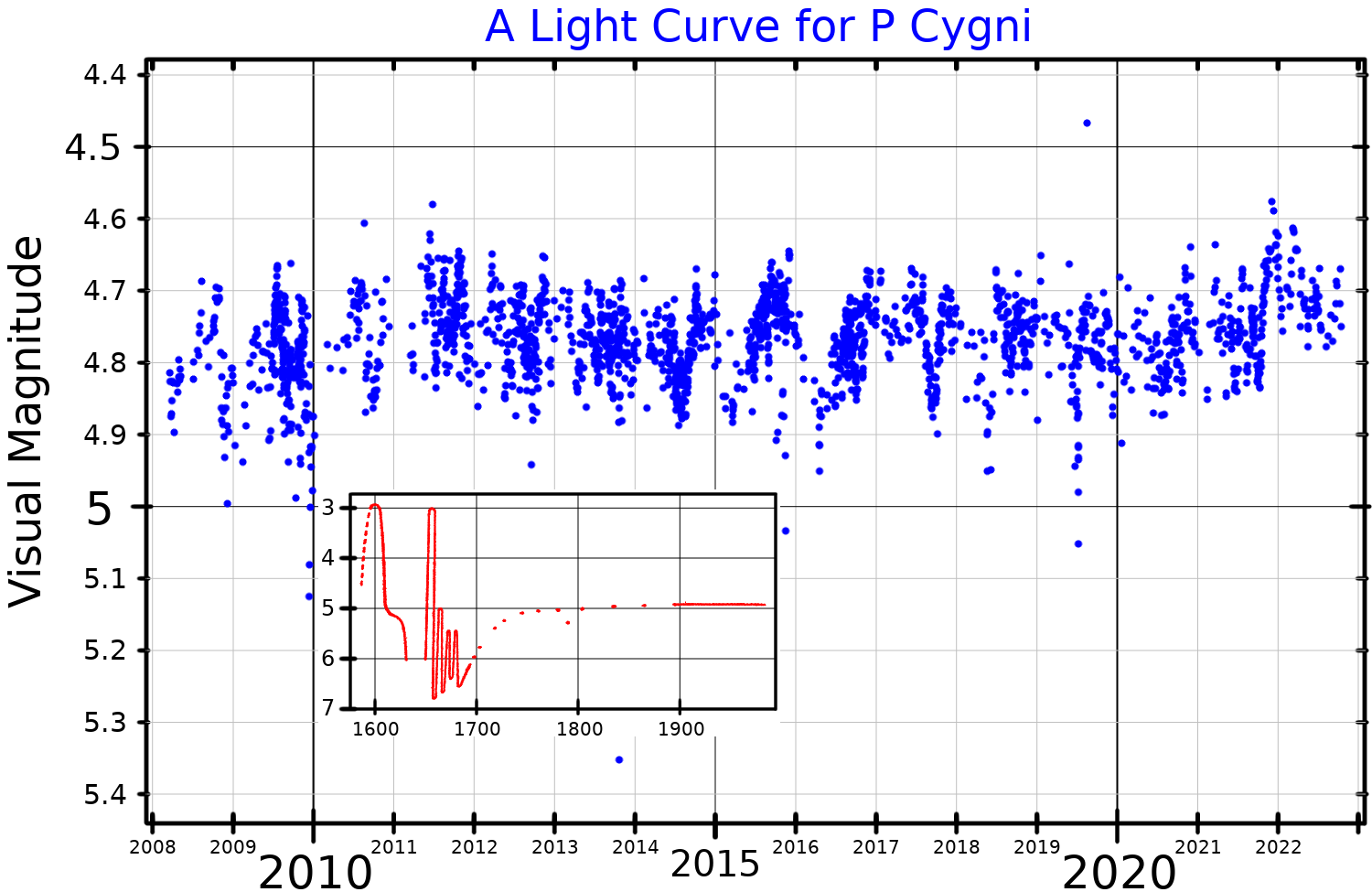
A visual band light curve for P Cygni. The main plot is from AAVSO data. The inset plot, adapted from de Groot (1988), shows the variability for the first 400 years after the star's discovery.

P Cygni is widely considered to be the earliest known example of a luminous blue variable. However, it is far from a typical example. Typically, LBVs change in brightness with a period of years to decades, occasionally hosting outbursts where the brightness of the star increases dramatically. P Cygni has been largely unvarying both in brightness and spectrum since a series of large outbursts in the 17th century. Similar events have been seen in Eta Carinae and possibly a handful of extra-galactic objects.

P Cygni does show evidence for previous large eruptions around 900, 2,100, and possibly 20,000 years ago. In more recent centuries, it has been very slowly increasing in visual magnitude and decreasing in temperature, which has been interpreted as the expected evolutionary trend of a massive star towards a red supergiant stage.

== Evolution ==
Luminous blue variables like P Cygni are very rare and short lived, and only form in regions of galaxies where intense star formation is happening. LBV stars are so massive and energetic (typically 50 times the mass of the Sun and hundreds of thousands of times more luminous) that they exhaust their nuclear fuel very quickly. After shining for only a few million years (compared to several billion years for the Sun) they erupt in a supernova. The recent supernova SN 2006gy was likely the end of an LBV star similar to P Cygni but located in a distant galaxy. P Cygni is thought to be in the hydrogen shell burning phase immediately after leaving the main sequence.

It has been identified as a possible type IIb supernova candidate in modelling of the fate of stars 20 to 25 times the mass of the Sun (with LBV status as the predicted final stage beforehand).

== P Cygni profile ==
P Cygni's characteristic and eponymous line profile for H-α

P Cygni gives its name to a type of spectroscopic feature called a P Cygni profile, where the presence of both absorption and emission in the profile of the same spectral line indicates the existence of a gaseous envelope expanding away from the star. The emission line arises from a dense stellar wind near to the star, while the blueshifted absorption lobe is created where the radiation passes through circumstellar material rapidly expanding in the direction of the observer. These profiles are useful in the study of stellar winds in many types of stars. They are often cited as an indicator of a luminous blue variable star, although they also occur in other types of stars.

In P Cygni itself, the size of the stellar wind H-alpha emission region is 5.64±0.21 milli-arcseconds. At the distance of 1,600 parsecs this is a physical size of approximately 25 stellar radii.

== Companion ==
A companion star to P Cygni was revealed in 2021 using interferometry, which when discovered had an angular separation of 13.0±0.1 mas from the primary. It is 4.3 magnitudes fainter than P Cygni.

It has been proposed P Cygni's eruptions could be caused by mass transfer to a hypothetical companion star of spectral type B that would have a mass between 3 and 6 times the mass of the Sun and would orbit P Cygni each 7 years in a high eccentricity orbit. Infall of matter into the secondary star would produce the release of gravitational energy, part of which would cause an increase of the luminosity of the system.
