= Kourovka =

Kourovka may refer to:

- Kourovka, Sverdlovsk Oblast, a settlement in Sverdlovsk oblast
- Kourovka railway station, a station on Trans-Siberian Railway
- Kourovka Notebook, a list of open problems in group theory
- 4964 Kourovka, a minor planet
