= Perek =

Perek may refer to:

- Luboš Perek, a Czech astronomer
- a part of a masekhet
