= SBS 0953+549 =

Quasar in the constellation Ursa Major

SBSS 0953+549
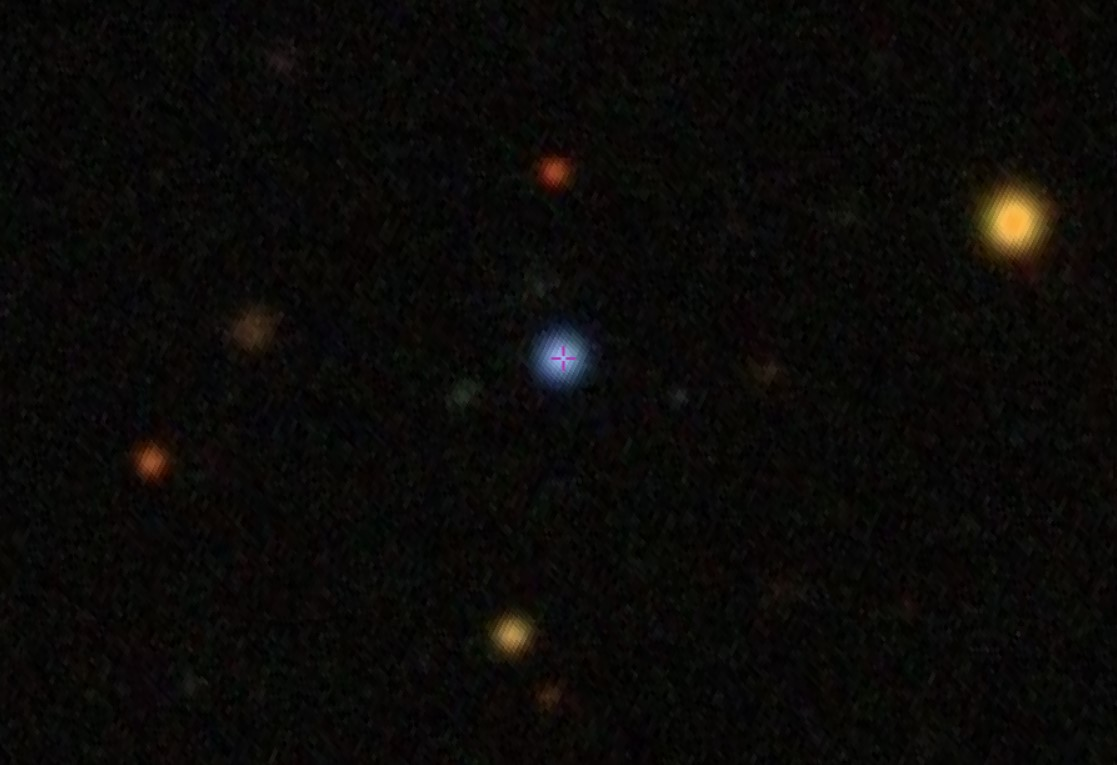
- SBSS 0953+549 captured by SDSS

Observation data (J2000.0 epoch)
- Constellation: Ursa Major
- Right ascension: 09h 57m 14.67s
- Declination: +54d 40m 17.53s
- Redshift: 2.589463
- Heliocentric radial velocity: 776,302 km/s
- Distance: 10.843 Gly (light travel time distance)
- Apparent magnitude (V): 0.018
- Apparent magnitude (B): 0.023
- Surface brightness: 17.4

Characteristics
- Type: HiBAL

Other designations
- 2MASS J09571464+5440179, PGC 4052729, SDSS J095714.67+544017.5, SBS 0953+549, NRRF J095714.6+544018, KODIAQ J095714+544017, QSO J0957+5440

SBSS 0953+549 also known as SBS 0953+549 and QSO J0957+5440, is a quasar located in the constellation of Ursa Major. With a redshift of 2.58, the object is located approximately 10.8 billion light-years away from Earth. It is classified as a broad absorption-line quasar (BAL QSO) by the Sloan Digital Sky Survey. It was first studied in the 1980s as part of the Second Byurakan Survey.

SBS 0953+549 contains both strong and weak absorption systems. It has powerful ultraviolet emission lines and an energic nuclear module. A further investigation have shown it possesses an emission line profile similar to that of a P Cygni-type, featuring Lyman α and β line pairs.
