= Balbinot =

Balbinot may refer to:

- 48715 Balbinot, a minor planet discovered on September 13, 1996 in Bologna, Italy
- Balbinot 1, a low-luminosity globular cluster in the constellation of Pegasus.
- Diego Balbinot (born 1984), former Brazilian footballer with Italian Passport
