= TD1 =

TD1 or TD-1 may refer to:

- TD1 postal district, in the TD postcode area, covering Galashiels in the Scottish Borders
- Taepodong-1 missile
- TD1 Catalog of Stellar Ultraviolet Fluxes, a star catalogue
- TD1 Personal Credits Tax Return, used by employers in Canada
- TD-1 visa or TD-1 immigration status, for family members of Canadian citizens working in the US in the TN-1 status
