= Jones-Emberson 1 =

Planetary nebula in the Lynx constellation

Nebula
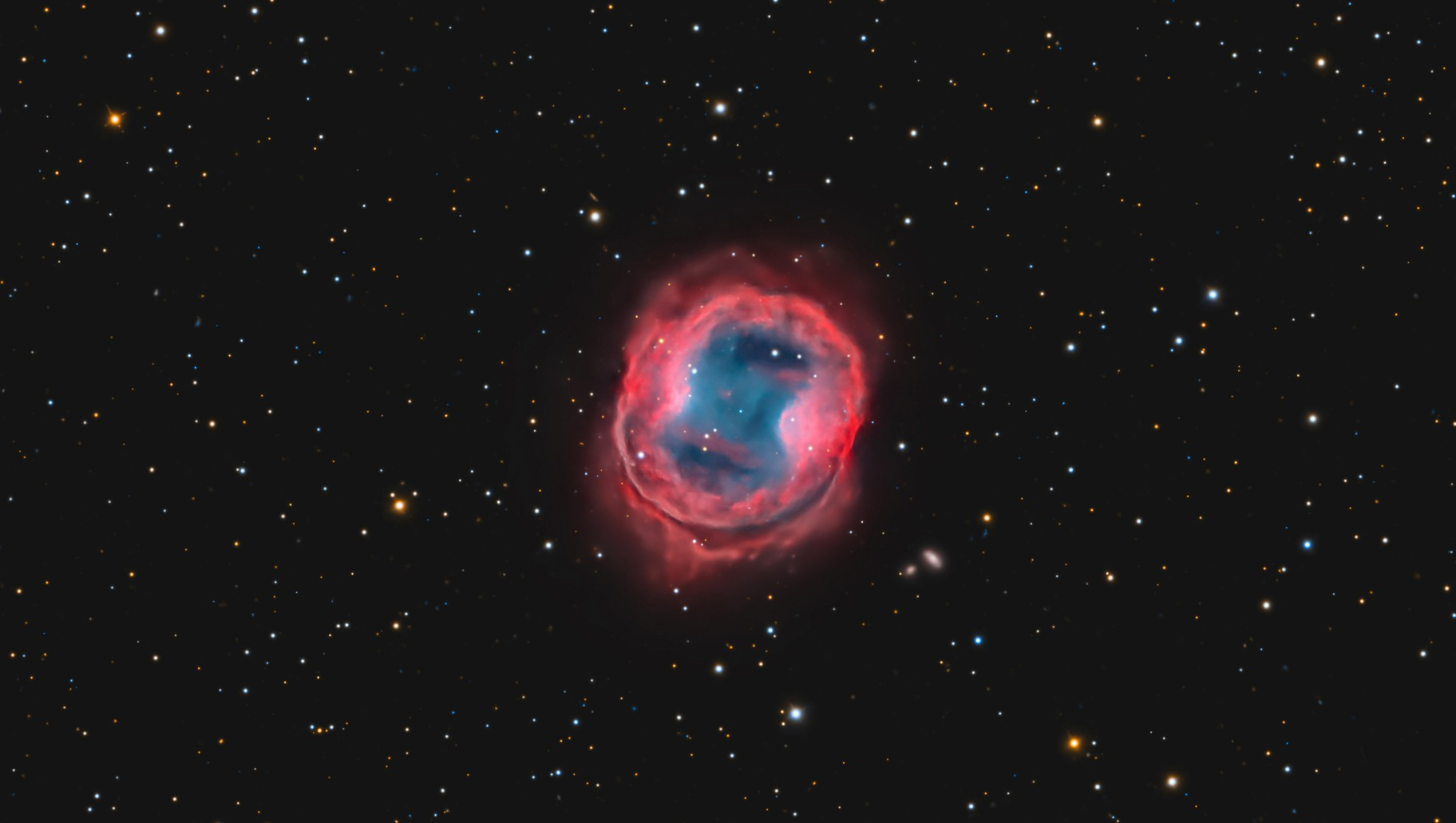
- Planetary Nebula Jones-Emberson 1 (PK164+31.1). Captured By Hunter Outten & Kaleb Jordan

Observation data: J2000 epoch
- Right ascension: 07^{h} 57^{m} 51.628^{s}
- Declination: +53° 25′ 16.96″
- Distance: 1600 ly
- Apparent magnitude (V): 14
- Apparent dimensions (V): 400 arc seconds
- Constellation: Lynx
- Designations: PK164+31.1, PN ARO 121, Headphone Nebula

Jones-Emberson 1 (PK 164+31.1), also known as the Headphone Nebula, is a 14th magnitude planetary nebula in the constellation Lynx at a distance of 1600 light years. It is a larger planetary with low surface brightness. The 16.8-magnitude central star is a very blue white dwarf.

== Historic data ==
Discovered in 1939 by Rebecca Jones and Richard M. Emberson, its "PK" designation comes from the names of Czechoslovak astronomers Luboš Perek and Luboš Kohoutek, who in 1967 created an extensive catalog of all of the planetary nebulae known in the Milky Way as of 1964. The numbers indicate the position of the object on the sky. ("PK 164+31.1" basically represents the planetary nebula that when using the galactic coordinate system has a galactic longitude of 164 degrees, a galactic latitude of +31 degrees, and is the first such object in the Perek-Kohoutek catalog to occupy that particular one square degree area of sky).

== Gallery ==
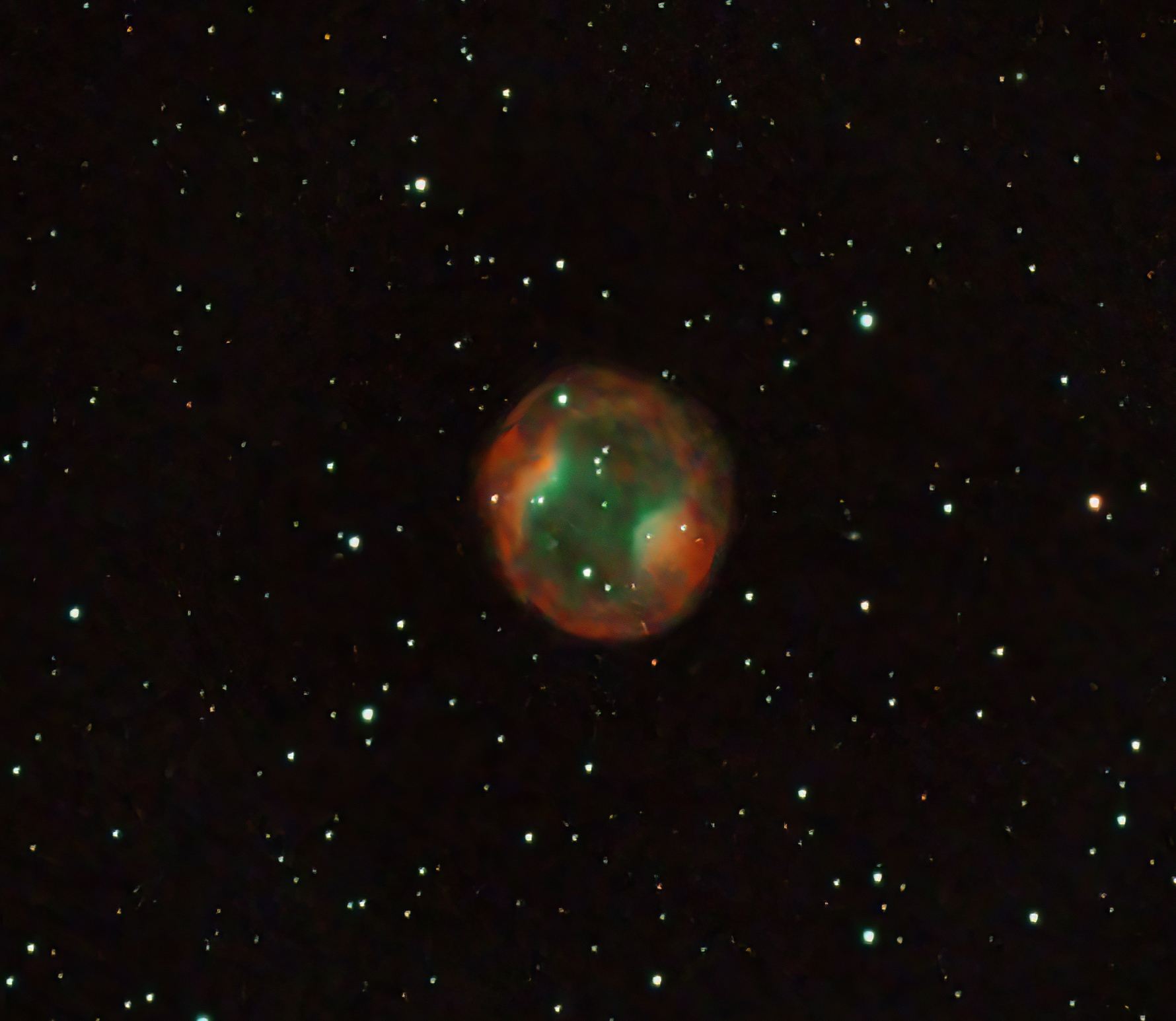
Amateur astronomer photo of Jones-Emberson 1

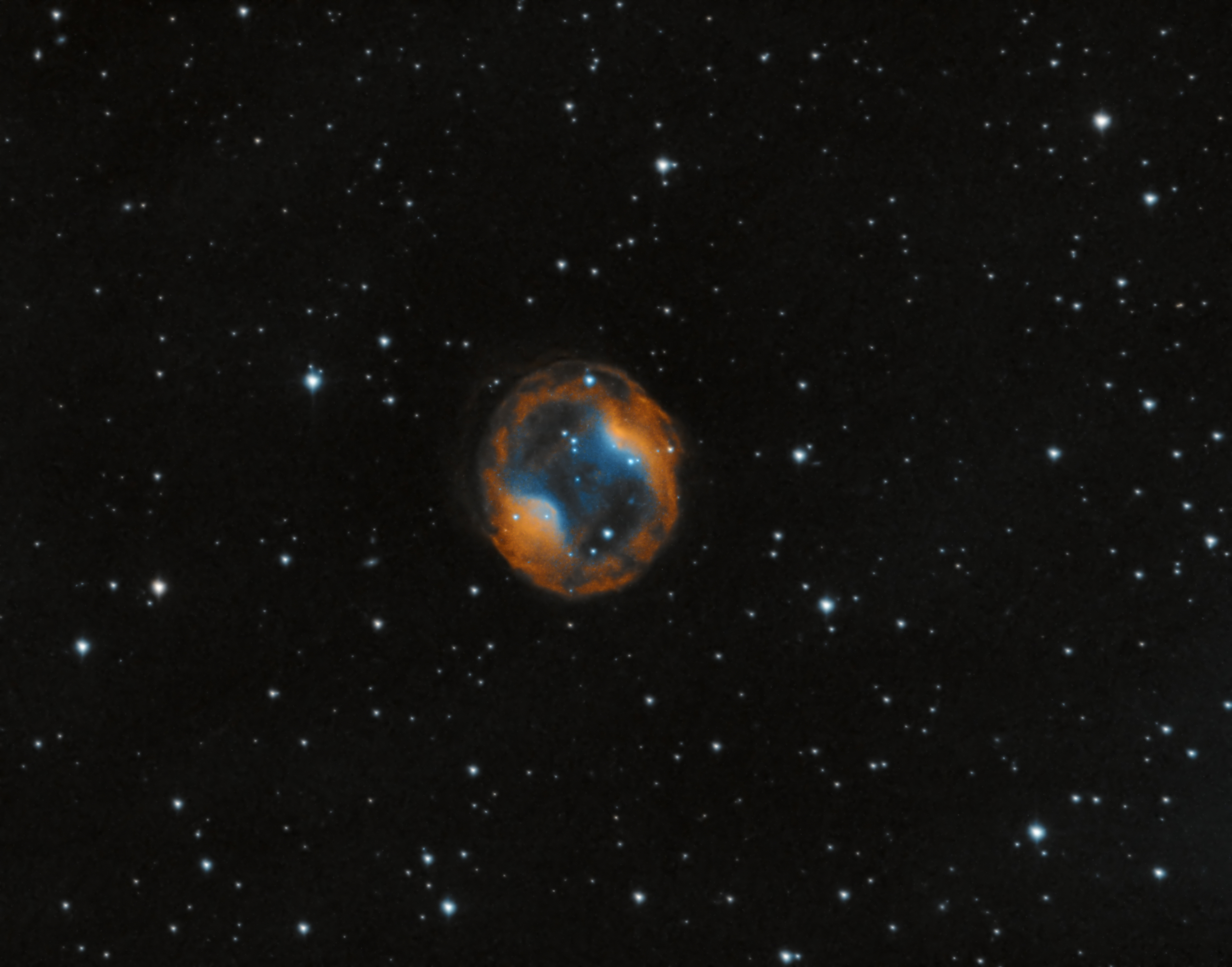
Planetary nebula Jones-Emberson 1 (PK164+31.1) shot in HOO

== See also ==
- List of planetary nebulae
