= Catalog of 5,268 Standard Stars Based on the Normal System N30 =

Star catalogue created by Herbert Rollo Morgan

Catalog of 5,268 Standard Stars Based on the Normal System N30 is the 1952 auxiliary star catalogue created by Herbert Rollo Morgan to address proper motion inaccuracies in 19th century observations by converting contemporary catalogues from a mean epoch around 1900 (±0.1 yr) to epoch and equinox 1950.0. However, the positions were derived from more than 70 recent catalogs with epochs of observation between 1917 and 1949. The N30 system is independent from any other astrometric system. Independent proper motions were determined by comparing the 1930 normal positions with the normal positions at the mean epoch, 30 years earlier, in the Albany General Catalogue, corrected by Morgan in 1948. Its primary use is the incorporation of 19th century astronomical data into modern research, and includes Harvard photometric magnitude, Henry Draper (HD) spectral type, and proper motion.

== See also ==
- B1950
- J2000
