= Kourovka Astronomical Observatory =

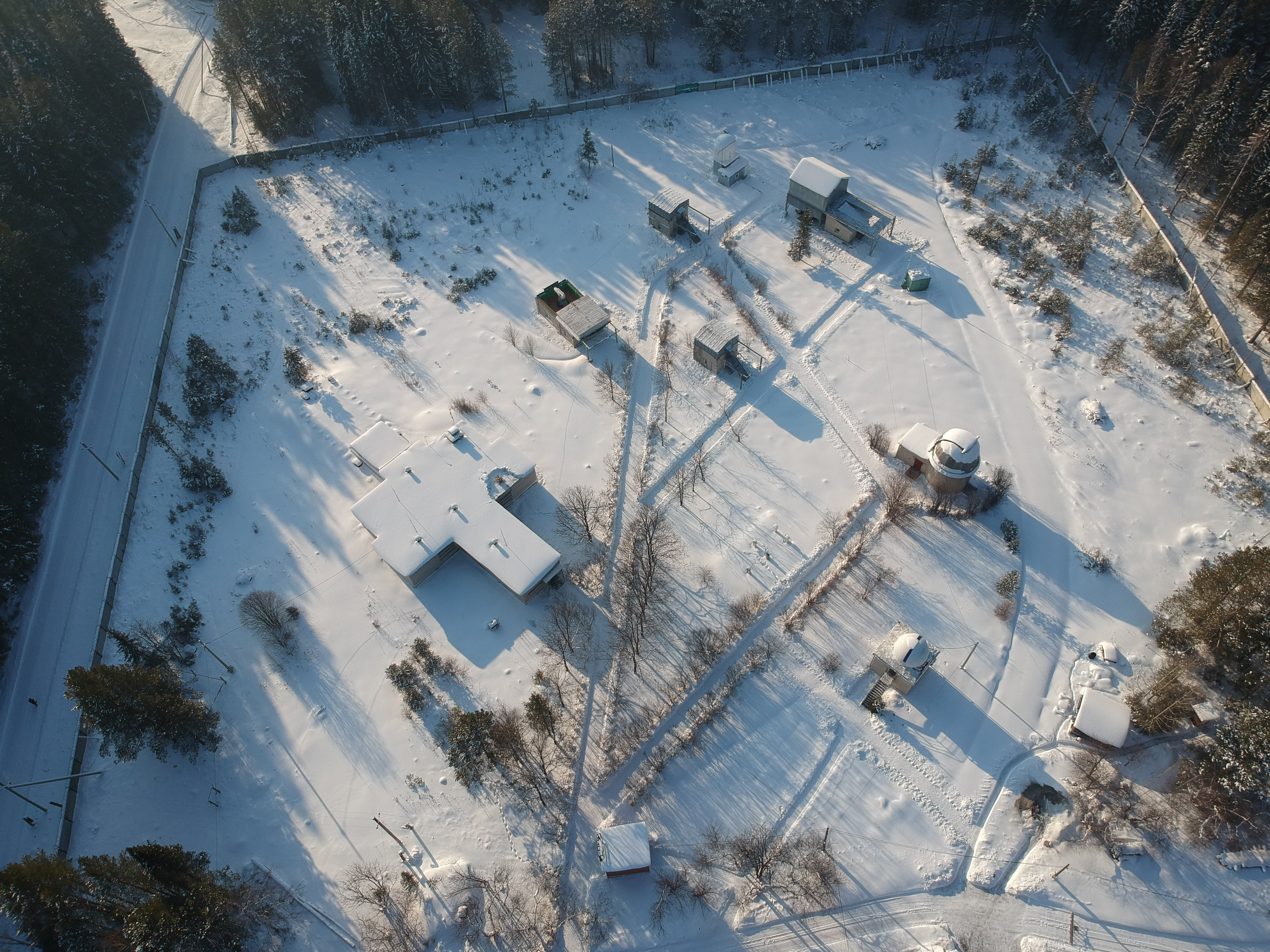
- Alternative names: Kourovka Astronomical Observatory
- Named after: Klavdiâ Barkhatova
- Observatory code: 168
- Location: Kourovka, Sverdlovsk Oblast, Ural Federal District, Russia
- Coordinates: 57°02′12″N 59°32′50″E
- Established: 1965
- Website: kourovka.ru
- Related media on Commons

Kourovka Astronomical Observatory, officially known as K.A. Barkhatova Kourovka Astronomical Observatory, is an observatory in Kourovka, Sverdlovsk Oblast, Russia. The observatory is operated by the Institute of Natural Sciences and Mathematics, a subdivision of Ural Federal University. It is named for a former professor at Ural Federal University, K.A. Barkhatova, a Soviet astronomer.

== Description ==
Kourovka Astronomical Observatory established in 1965 by Ural State University (now Ural Federal University), which had already established a smaller observatory in 1957. At the time, the Soviet Union was in the height of its early space program, with the Sputnik series of satellites having been launched in the late 1950s. One of the main proponents for the establishment of the observatory was K.A. Barkhatova, an astronomer who had graduated from the university in 1941. The intent of the new observatory was to track the movements of artificial satellites, with the facility later expanding to study other aspects of astronomy.

The observatory is equipped with a varied array of telescopes which it uses to collect data for Russian and international programs. Object monitored include stars, the Sun, and other nearer-to-earth objects. The observatory has also gathered data to be used for the discovery of new star systems and exoplanets.

A powerful SBG telescope was installed at the observatory in 2005. The observatory is also host to an exoplanet finding program, the Kourovka Planet Search project. The project is carried out using the observatory's advanced telescopes, including a telescope (designated MASTER-I and MASTER-II-URAL) control by a robotics network. Specifically, Kourovka's telescopes were used to search for signs of exoplanets in the constellation Cygnus. Equipment at Kourovka was also used to perform a photometric study of V1033 Cas, a rare intermediate polar star system.

According to the observatory's website, the site is the only observatory positioned to monitor the range of longitudes from Kazan to Irkutsk.

A minor planet, 4964 Kourovka, is named for the observatory.
