= Klavdiâ Barkhatova =

Soviet astronomer

- Born: 7 November [O.S. 25 October] 1917; Nizhny Tagil, Perm Governorate, Russia
- Died: 19 January 1990 (aged 72); Sverdlovsk, RSFSR, Soviet Union
- Occupation: Astronomer

Klavdiya Aleksandrovna Barkhatova (Russian: Клавдия Александровна Бархатова; 1917-1990) was a Soviet astronomer. She became notable for he studies into stellar astronomy and eventually became a highly respected specialist in the field, producing a large body of scientific works. Kourovka Astronomical Observatory in Kourovka, Sverdlovsk Oblast is named in her honor.

== Biography ==
Barkhatova was born in November 1917 in Nizhny Tagil, Sverdlovsk Oblast, the daughter of Alexander Barkhatov, a prominent Bolshevik. According to one source, Alexander was assigned to Nizhnyaya Salda during the Soviet Union's collectivized agriculture program and so Klavdiâ grew up in that town. After graduating high school Barkhatova enrolled in Ural State University, graduating in August 1941.

Upon graduating from college, Barkhatova was hired on as an assistant as Ural State University, going on to become an assistant professor by 1948. While working at the university she continued her education, successfully defending her thesis in 1949. She also went on to pursue a doctorate at Moscow State University. She was appointed as the head of the department of science and mathematics as Ural State University in 1951, continuing in this role until 1953. She also became a member of the International Astronomical Union; according to the IAU's directory, Barkhatova worked as an organizer for a committee dedicated to the study of star clusters and associations.

During her time at Ural State University, Barkhatova became known as an expert on stellar astronomy. In the late 1950s she became a proponent for the construction of observatories at Ural State, which had constructed its first in 1957. She would go on to become the driving force behind the construction of Kourovka Astronomical Observatory in the town Kourovka. When construction finished in 1965, Barkhatova became the first director of the observatory (which would later be named the K.A. Barkhatova Kourovka Astronomical Observatory in her honor). A minor planet, 5781 Barkhatova, is also named in honor of Barkhatova. The Academic Council of the Faculty of Physics of the Ural State University has awarded a scholarship in honor of Barkhatova.

Barkhatova died in 1990 and is interred in Shirokorechenskoye cemetery in Yekaterinburg.
