= Ka LMC 1 =

Planetary nebula

Nebula
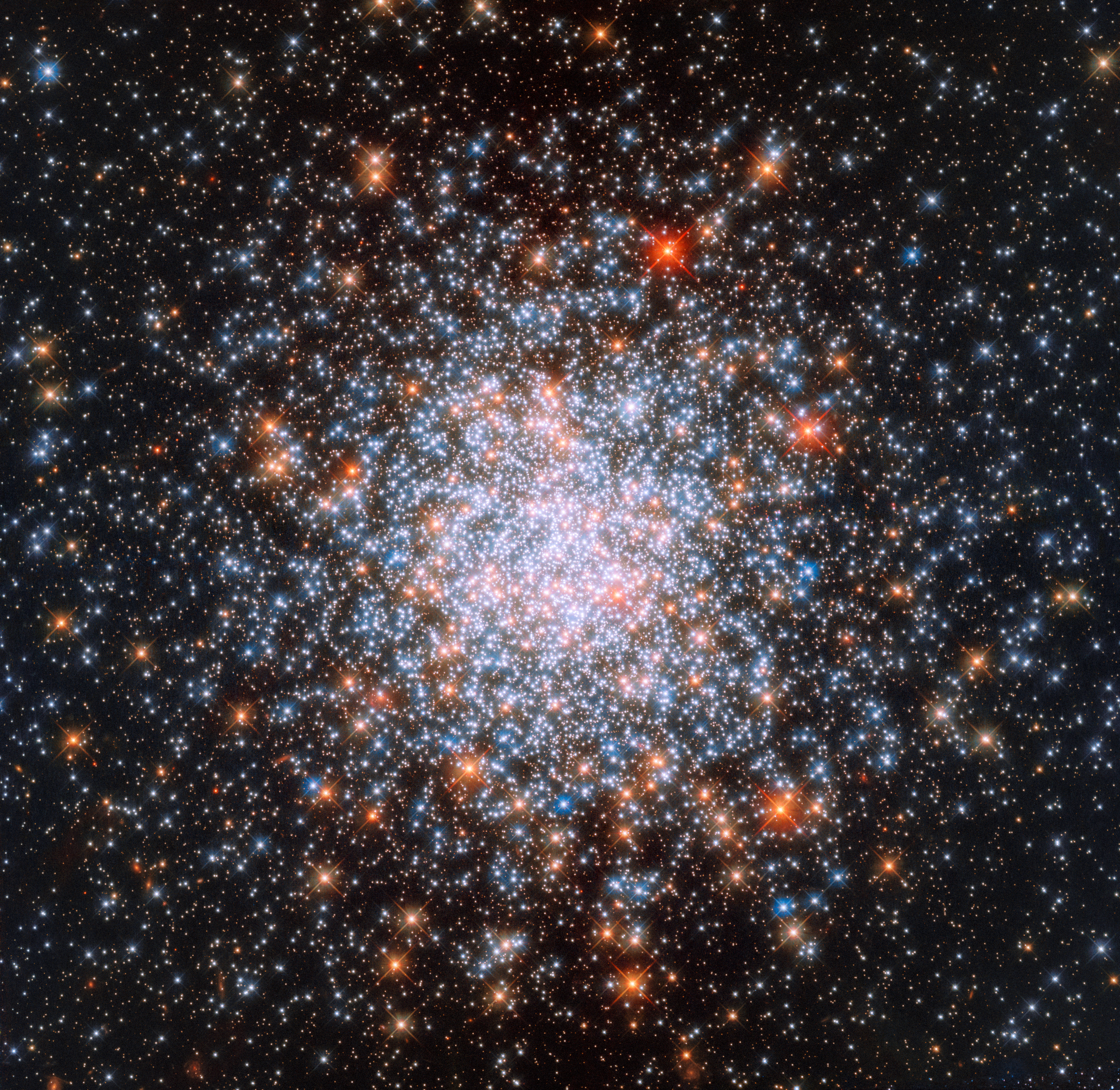
- Image of NGC 1866, where Ka LMC 1 is located in, by the Hubble Space Telescope (HST).

Observation data: J2000 epoch
- Right ascension: 5:13:35.561
- Declination: −65:27:41.23
- Distance: ~160,000 ly
- Constellation: Dorado

Ka LMC 1 is a faint planetary nebula located around 160,000 light years from Earth in the Large Magellanic Cloud (LMC) in the constellation of Dorado. It is highly likely to be a member of a young (~200 mya) but massive globular cluster known as NGC 1866. The nebula is located near the center of this cluster. The progenitor star likely had a high mass at around 3.9 solar masses. The nebula began to form around 18,000 years ago when this star in its red giant phase of life began to shed its outer material into space. Currently the star takes on a faint very blue appearance based on archival images of NGC 1866 from the Hubble Space Telescope.

Due to the accidental discovery and use of data not ideal for the study of nebula such as Ka LMC 1, comparatively little is known about it. This means that follow up observations are needed to determine the specific properties of Ka LMC 1 and its central star, such as its chemical abundance, excitation class, etc.

== Characteristics ==
Ka LMC 1 shows an old (~18,000 yr) and highly evolved state with a highly dynamical nature. It shows a classical ring-like morphology. but may show a bipolar morphology with us viewing it nearly pole-on. This pole-on core view is supported by the low extinction levels.

Ka LMC 1 is nitrogen-rich planetary nebula. It has a low surface brightness and low electron density. The central star excites the nebular material around it.
