= Herbert Rollo Morgan =

American astronomer (1875–1957)

Herbert Rollo Morgan (21 March 1875 – 11 June 1957) was an American astronomer. His major lifetime work was on the production of the Catalog of 5,268 Standard Stars Based on the Normal System N30 published in 1952.

Morgan was born near Medford, Minnesota to Henry and Olive Sabre Smith Morgan. He became asthmatic an early age and the family moved to Tennessee where he studied. He obtained an AB from the University of Virginia, followed by a PhD in 1901. He received a Vanderbilt Fellowship at the Leander McCormick Observatory. He then worked at the US Naval Observatory as a computer and moved to Pritchett College in 1905 as a professor of mathematics. In 1907 he joined the Naval Observatory as an assistant astronomer and began to work on a catalog until his retirement in 1944. He then worked as a research associate at Yale University. His work on cataloguing recorded the positions, luminosities, and motions of 5268 stars.

Morgan married Fannie Evelyn Wallis in 1904 and they had a daughter. He served as a president of the Commission on Meridian Astronomy of the International Astronomical Union from 1938 to 1948 and as associate editor of The Astronomical Journal from 1942 to 1948.
