= RBC EXT8 =

Globular cluster

RBC EXT8 is a globular cluster in the galaxy Messier 31, 27 kpc from the galactic nucleus. The spectral lines reveal levels of iron 800 times lower than the Sun. Its position is right ascension 00h53m14s.53, declination +41°33′24′′. (J2000 equinox) according to the Revised Bologna Catalogue (10). Its magnitude is 15.79, and 15.5" across.
