= Alois Purgathofer =

Austrian astronomer (1925–1984)

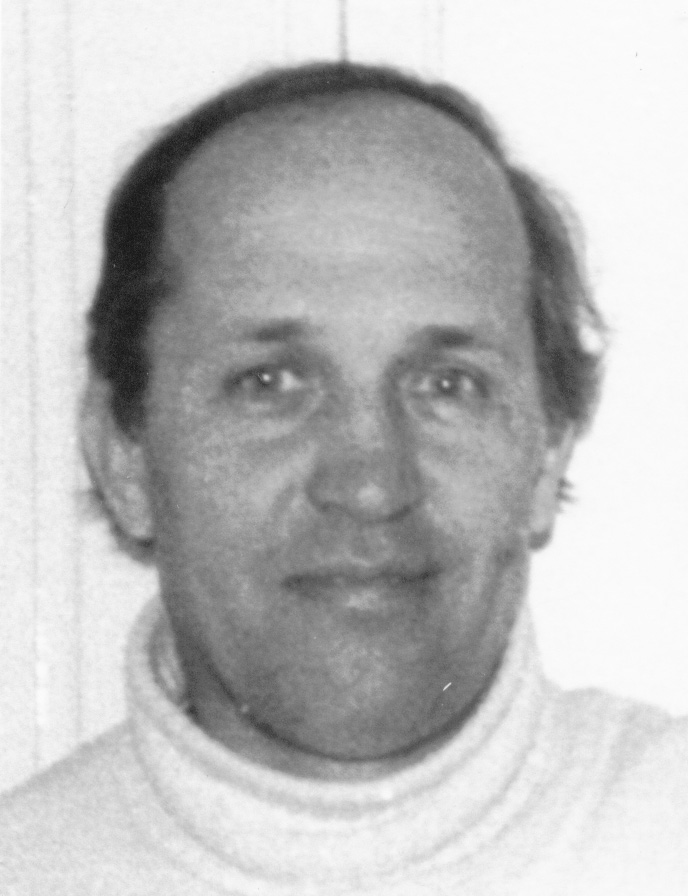
Alois Purgathofer

Alois Purgathofer (18 February 1925 – 13 March 1984), was an Austrian astronomer at the Vienna Observatory from 1954 to 1984. He mainly worked on the photometry of galactic star clusters, but also on the asteroid 51 Nemausa. In 1969 the Leopold Figl observatory was built on the Mitterschöpfl mountain under his technical and astronomical advice, containing a 1.5 m Ritchey–Chrétien telescope. His knowledge of astronomical instruments was legendary, especially of optical and electronic devices and of image converters. He died unexpectedly on 13 March 1984 during a business trip to the Calar Alto Observatory in Almería, Spain.

In his honour Rudolf Pressberger named his self built observatory in Klosterneuburg-Kierling “Purgathofer-Sternwarte”, and also the asteroid 5341 was named “Purgathofer”.
