= Kim 2 =

Globular cluster

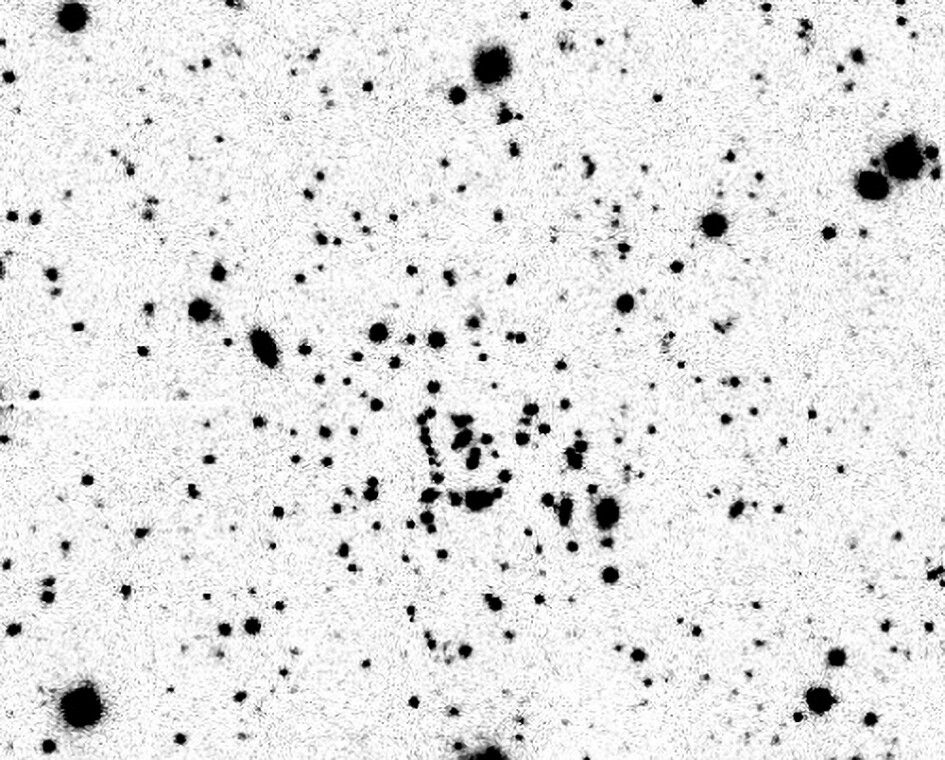

Observation data (J2000 epoch)
- Constellation: Indus
- Right ascension: 21^{h} 08^{m} 49.970^{s}
- Declination: −51° 09′ 48.60″
- Distance: 104.7±4.1 kpc
- Apparent dimensions (V): 0.28′ (half-mass diameter)

Physical characteristics
- Absolute magnitude: −1.5±0.5
- Mass: 600 M_{☉}
- Metallicity: [Fe/H] = −1.0+0.18 −0.21 dex
- Estimated age: 11.5+2 −3.5 Gyr
- Other designations: Indus I

Kim 2, also known as Indus I, is a distant globular cluster in the constellation of Indus. It was discovered by Dongwon Kim of the Stromlo Milky Way Satellite Survey run by the Australian National University using the SkyMapper telescope images. Since it was so faint it needed examination by more powerful telescopes like those at the Cerro Tololo Inter-American Observatory. It is possibly the core of a dwarf galaxy that has been swallowed up by the Milky Way. This cluster is unusual in that it has far fewer stars than most globular clusters. Kim 2 is more enriched in metals than most other outer globular clusters, suggesting that it formed later.

The cluster is 105 kpc away from Earth. The half light radius is 12.8 pc. The metallicity [Fe/H] is about −1.0.
