= IRSF =

IRSF is an acronym that may mean:

- Inland Revenue Staff Federation, a trade union in the United Kingdom
- The South African Astronomical Observatory's Infrared Survey Facility
- International Revenue Share Fraud, a type of phone fraud.
