= Laevens 3 =

Globular cluster in the constellation Delphinus

Observation data (J2000 epoch)
- Constellation: Delphinus
- Right ascension: 21^{h} 06^{m} 55.05^{s}
- Declination: +14° 59′ 03.84″
- Distance: 200+4 −3 kly (61.4+1.2 −1.0 kpc)

Physical characteristics
- Absolute magnitude: −2.8
- Radius: effective: 0.64 ± 0.05′ or 37.2 ± 3.3 ly (11.4 ± 1.0 pc)
- Metallicity: [Fe/H] = −1.8 ± 0.1 dex

Laevens 3 is a globular cluster in the constellation of Delphinus. It belongs to the Milky Way but orbits far from the centre. The cluster is named after Benjamin P. M. Laevens, the discoverer. It was first observed in 2015 using Pan-STARRS 1.

It is located 210,000 light years from Earth in the outer galactic halo. Its orbit takes it as close as 133,000 ly from galactic centre out to 279,000 ly. The half light diameter is only 37 light years. The metallicity is −1.8 dex. It is about 13 billion years old, and its brightness is equivalent to 1,125 Suns.
