= Richaud =

Surname

Richaud is a surname. Notable people with the surname include:

- Étienne Richaud, Governor General for Inde française in the Second French Colonial Empire under Third Republic
- André de Richaud (1909–1961), French poet and writer
- Benoît Richaud (born 1988), French ice dancer
- Paul Marie André Richaud (1887–1968), French Cardinal of the Roman Catholic Church
