= 2MASS-GC02 =

Globular cluster

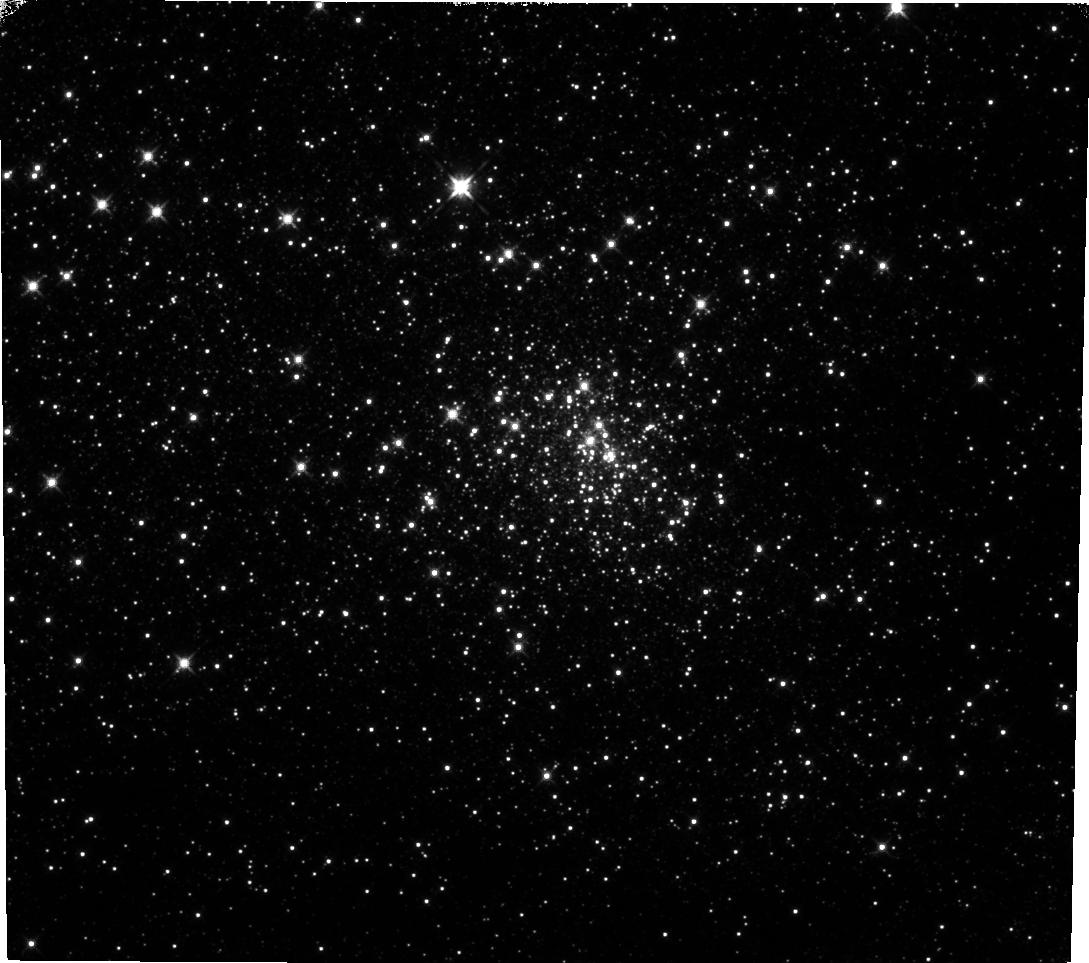
- 2MASS-GC02, imaged by Hubble Space Telescope

Observation data (J2000 epoch)
- Class: IV
- Constellation: Sagittarius
- Right ascension: 18^{h} 09^{m} 36.5^{s}
- Declination: −20° 46′ 44″
- Distance: 16.0 kly (4.9 kpc)
- Apparent magnitude (V): 24.60

Physical characteristics
- Absolute magnitude: −4.86
- Radius: 0.95′ × 0.95′
- Metallicity: [Fe/H] = −1.08 dex
- Other designations: Hurt 2

2MASS-GC02, also known as Hurt 2, is a globular cluster at a distance of about 16 thousand light-years from Earth in the constellation Sagittarius. It was discovered in 2000 by Joselino Vasquez together with globular cluster 2MASS-GC01 and a spiral galaxy 2MASXI J0730080-220105, and confirmed by a team of astronomers under the leadership of R. J. Hurt at 2MASS.

The globular cluster 2MASS-GC02 is not in the visible portion of the electromagnetic spectrum, due to interstellar extinction, but was spotted in infrared light. It is located at a distance of 10.4 thousand light years from the center of the Milky Way. Due to its trajectory, it has a negative radial velocity meaning it is approaching the Solar System, but its radial velocity is unclear. The radial velocity was originally put at −238 km/s, but a newer analysis determined it to be −87 km/s; a 150 km/s difference.
