= ETHOS 1 =

Planetary nebula located in the constellation Lyra

Emission nebula
- Planetary nebula

Observation data: J2000 epoch
- Right ascension: 19^{h} 16^{m} 31.5^{s}
- Declination: 36° 09′ 47.9″
- Distance: 19,500±27,500 ly
- Apparent diameter: ~62.6" (jets) ~19.4" (main)
- Constellation: Lyra
- Designations: ATO J289.1311+36.1632, PN G068.1+11.0

ETHOS 1 is a high-latitude planetary nebula (PN) in the constellation of Lyra. This nebula is notable for possessing fast polar jets and was discovered by the Extremely Turquoise Halo Object Survey. It is also the first planetary nebula discovered by ETHOS.

ETHOS 1 is a High latitude planetary nebula. fewer than 9 percent of galactic PNe are located at latitudes |b| ≳ 10°. The PN has a inner nebula and a main nebula accompanied by 2 jets. The inner nebula features major emission lines such as O III and Hβ, it has a diameter of ~19.4 arcseconds and a kinematical age of approximately 900 ± 100 years kpc⁻¹. The main nebula of ETHOS 1 has a high electron temperature of 17,700 ± 500 K. The N II emission line extends out to ~2 arcseconds, which is the outermost reigon, there is also a He II line that is brighter than Hβ line which is a clear indication that the nebula is density-bounded even though the ionized mass of the nebula is low at ~0.002.

ETHOS 1 has 2 polar outflows (jets) traveling at 120 ± 10 km sec⁻¹. The northwest jet has a velocity of 65 ± 5 km s⁻¹ while the southwest jet has a velocity of -55 ± 5 km s⁻¹. The jets has a diameter of 62.6 arcseconds with kinematical ages of approximately 1750±250 years kpc⁻¹. The presence of O III in the jet and its relatively low temperature (12,900 K) indicate that strong, radiative cooling is occurring in the post-shock region.

== Binary star system ==
The central star is a close binary central star of PNe (CSPN) that shows evidence of passing through a common-envelope (CE) phase. The central star is a ∼140-kK white dwarf with a mass of ∼0.84 M_{☉}. making it one of the hottest and most massive post-CE central star known.
