= Mercer 3 =

Globular cluster in the constellation Scutum

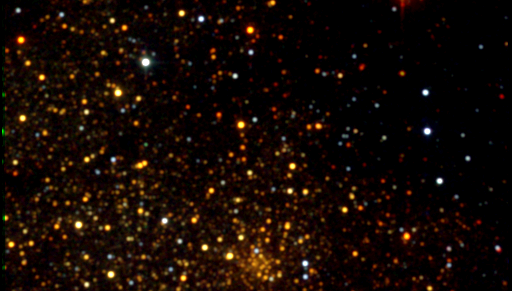
- 2MASS image of Mercer 3

Observation data (J2000 epoch)
- Constellation: Scutum
- Right ascension: 18^{h} 18^{m} 30^{s}
- Declination: −16° 58′ 36″
- Distance: 13–26 kly (4–8 kpc)
- Apparent magnitude (V): not visible
- Apparent dimensions (V): 39″ (half-light diameter)

Physical characteristics
- Mass: (2–3)×10^{5} M_{☉}
- Radius: 2–5 ly
- Estimated age: 12 Gyr

Mercer 3, also known as GLIMPSE-C02, is a heavily obscured globular cluster embedded in the disk of the Milky Way galaxy. It was discovered in 2008 in the data obtained by 2MASS and GLIMPSE infrared surveys, and independently characterized by two groups. The cluster is located in the constellation Scutum. It had avoided detection for such a long time due to the extremely strong foreground extinction in its direction reaching 24 magnitudes in the visible light. Mercer 3 is probably situated at the distance from 4 to 8 kpc from the Sun and has a half-light radius of 0.7–1.5 pc.

Mercer 3 is an old globular cluster having the age of about 12 billion years. The mass of cluster is estimated at 2–3 hundred thousand solar masses. It is among the most metal-rich galactic globular clusters known.
