= Harold Jacoby =

American astronomer

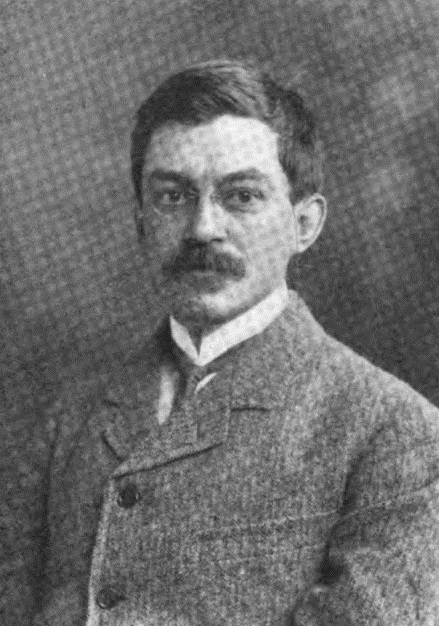
- Born: March 4, 1865
- Died: July 20, 1932 (aged 67)
- Education: Columbia University
- Occupation: Astronomer

Harold Jacoby (4 March 1865 – 20 July 1932) was an American astronomer, born in New York City.

== Career overview ==
Jacoby received his B.A. from Columbia College in 1885 and his Ph.D. from Columbia in 1896. He applied himself to astronomical research, and was appointed assistant astronomer for the United States eclipse expedition to West Africa (1889–90).

He was a professor at Columbia University from 1885 until 1929, teaching Astronomy, Geodesy, and Navigation. He chaired the department until shortly before his death. Columbia's Rutherfurd Observatory was started during his tenure, with a twelve-inch Clarke refractor telescope and a transit instrument emplaced atop Pupin Hall.

Jacoby made many observations of celestial events such as lunar and solar eclipses. He was well known in Europe and America, and was a member of a large number of scientific groups. He published Practical Talks by an Astronomer (1891, 1902), Astronomy: A Popular Handbook (1913) and Navigation (1917).
