= Catalogue of rotational velocities of the stars =

Catalogue of rotational velocities of the stars is the name for catalogue of projected stellar rotation, published in 1982 by Uesugi, A. and Fukuda, I.

== Downloadable catalogs of the projected stellar rotation ==
- Standard source - Uesugi&Fukuda catalog, published in 1982, 6472 objects
- Older source - Bernacca&Perinotto catalog published in 1973, 3099 objects
- Newer source - Glebocki&al. catalog published in 2000, 17490 objects

== See also ==
- General Catalogue of Stellar Radial Velocities
