= Gamma ray observatory =

Gamma ray observatory or Gamma Ray Observatory can refer to:

- Any observatory used for gamma ray astronomy.
- The Compton Gamma Ray Observatory, an observatory that operated from 1991 to 2000.
