= Segue 3 =

Star cluster

Observation data (J2000 epoch)
- Constellation: Pegasus
- Right ascension: 21^{h} 21^{m} 31^{s}
- Declination: 19° 07′ 02″
- Distance: 55.1 ± 2.3 kly (16.9 ± 0.7 kpc)
- Apparent magnitude (V): 14.9
- Apparent dimensions (V): 52 ± 10″ (half-light diameter)

Physical characteristics
- Radius: 6.8 ± 1.3 ly (2.1 ± 0.4 pc)
- Other designations: Segue 3

Segue 3 is a faint star cluster of the Milky Way galaxy discovered in 2010 in data obtained by Sloan Digital Sky Survey. It is located in the constellation Pegasus about 17 kpc from the Sun and is moving away from it at 167.1 ± 1.5 km/s.

Segue 3 is extremely faint—its visible absolute magnitude is estimated at −1.2 or even at about 0.0 ± 0.8, which means that the cluster is only 100 to 250 times brighter than the Sun. Its small radius—of about 2.1 pc—is typical for galactic globular clusters. The cluster has a slightly flattened shape and shows some evidence of tidal disruption.

The metallicity of Segue's 3 stars is [Fe/H] ≈ −1.7, which means that they contain 70 times less heavy elements than the Sun. These stars are more than 12 billion year old. Segue 3 appears to be one of the faintest globular clusters of the Milky Way.
