= NGC 1866 =

Globular cluster in the constellation Dorado

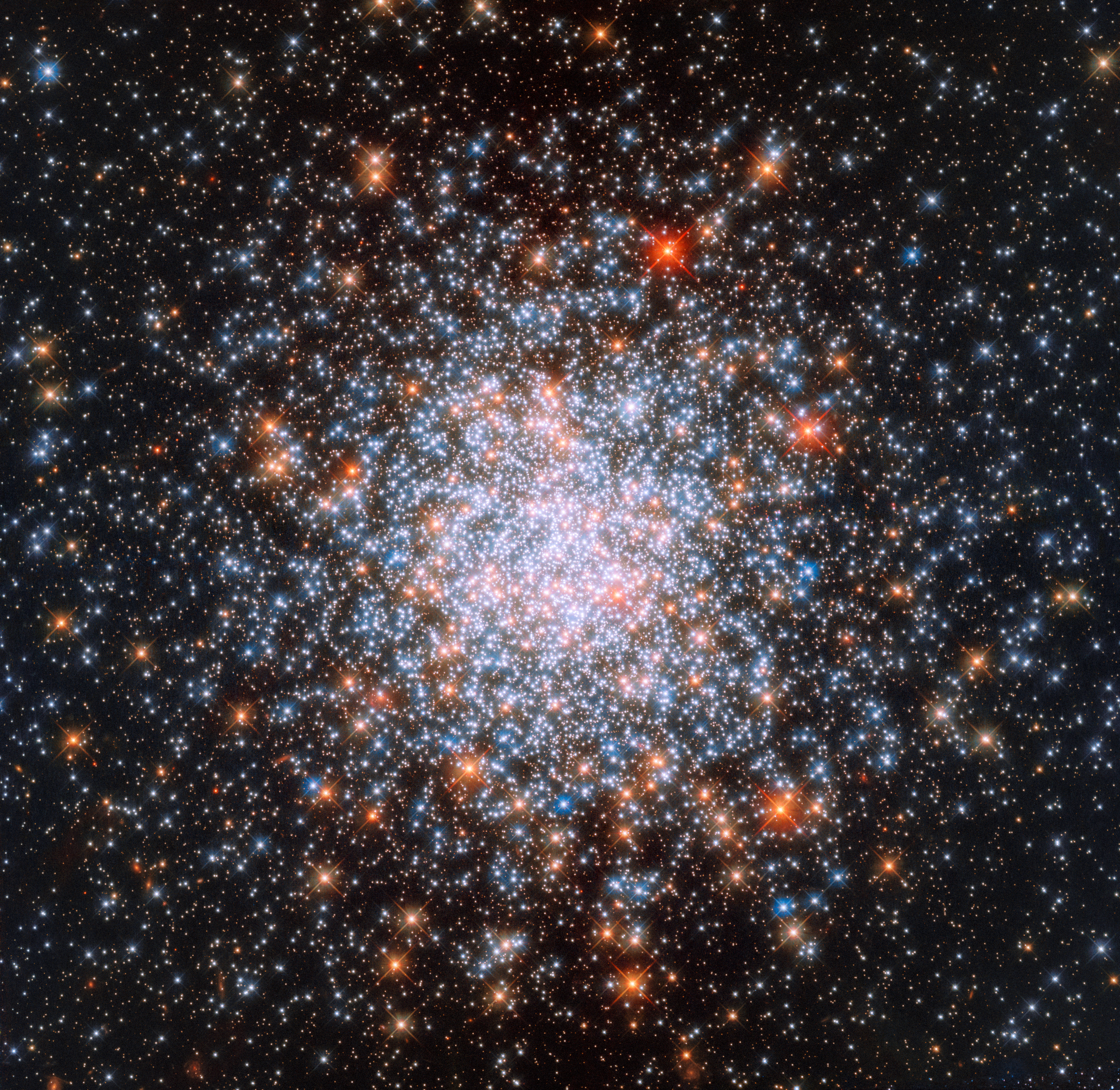
- NGC 1866 taken by Hubble Space Telescope

Observation data (J2000 epoch)
- Constellation: Dorado
- Right ascension: 05^{h} 13^{m} 38.92^{s}
- Declination: −65° 27′ 52.75″
- Distance: 161.7 kly (49.59 kpc)
- Apparent magnitude (V): 9.73
- Apparent dimensions (V): 5.50′ × 5.50′

Physical characteristics
- Mass: (1.35±0.25)×10^{5} M_{☉}
- Metallicity: [Fe/H] = −0.43±0.01 dex
- Estimated age: 190+20 −10 Ma
- Other designations: ESO 85-52, KMHK 664, LW 163, SL63 319, NGC 1866

NGC 1866 is a young globular cluster of stars near the northern edge of the Large Magellanic Cloud (LMC), located in the southern constellation of Dorado. NGC 1866 was discovered August 3, 1826 by British astronomer James Dunlop. The LMC is located at a distance of 161.7 thousand light-years (49.59 kpc) from the Sun, while NGC 1866 is orbiting 13.0 ± 1.7 thousand light-years (3.98 ± 0.53 kpc) from the LMC core.

An isochrone fit to the cluster members yields an estimated age of approximately 190 million years. Of the objects in the LMC that formed over the last three billion years, NGC 1866 may be one of the most massive, having an estimated 135,000 times the mass of the Sun. The cluster has a core radius of 11.1 ly (3.39 pc) and a 90% light radius of 47.6 ly (14.60 pc).

A. D. Thackeray began a search of NGC 1866 in 1948, finding some Cepheid variables. An independent study by H. Shapley and V. M. Nail in 1951 found 29 variables, of which 23 are Classical Cepheids with a notable lack of older type II Cepheids. Thackeray found both red and blue giants in the cluster, and the integrated color index of the cluster was very blue, suggesting a young age. The rich abundance of cepheids in this cluster, all at the same distance from the Earth, has made them a subject for frequent study.

One of the findings from studying young globular clusters in the Magellenic Clouds is that they exhibit bimodal main sequences on their color-magnitude diagrams. An investigation of NGC 1866 with the Hubble Space Telescope shows both a similar split main sequence and an extended main sequence turnoff (eMSTO). Spectroscopc study of eMSTO stars shows two populations: one older, rapidly rotating and the other younger and rotating more slowly. A study of Cepheid variables in NGC 1866 supports this dichotomy. The cluster contains a high abundance of fast rotating Be stars.

In 2025, a planetary nebula was discovered near the center of the cluster. Its size and expansion rate indicate an age of 18,000 years. The blue central star is visible, and the progenitor likely had an initial mass of 3.9 M_{☉}.
