= Balbinot 1 =

Globular cluster

Balbinot I

Observation data (J2000 epoch)
- Constellation: Pegasus
- Right ascension: 22^{h} 10^{m} 43.15^{s}
- Declination: +14° 56′ 58.8″
- Distance: 31.9 kpc (104 kly)
- Apparent magnitude (V): 16.31

Physical characteristics
- Radius: approx. 72 pc (230 ly)

Balbinot I is a low-luminosity globular cluster in the constellation of Pegasus. It is located 31.9 kpc away from the Sun, in the Milky Way galactic halo. Its total luminosity is similar to that of the clusters AM 4 and Koposov I, thus being one of the faintest globular clusters known. From Pan-STARRS data, the presence of tidal tails has been suggested.
