= Kourovka, Sverdlovsk Oblast =

Kourovka Коуровка
- settlement
- Interactive map of Kourovka
- Location of Kourovka Kourovka (Sverdlovsk Oblast)
- Coordinates: 57.0078°N 59.5964°E
- Country: Russia
- Federal subject: Sverdlovsk Oblast

Population (2010 Census)
  - Total: 315
  - Estimate (2010): 315 (0%)

Municipal status
  - Urban okrug: Pervouralsk Urban Okrug
- Time zone: UTC+5 (MSK+2)
- Postal code: 623100
- OKTMO ID: 65753000176

Kourovka (Russian: Коу́ровка) is a settlement in Pervouralsk Urban okrug in Sverdlovsk Oblast, Russia. Population: 315 (2010 census); 449 (2002 census);

External image
- The station building in Kourovka

Kourovka was founded in 1908 or 1909 as a railroad town near a station of the Trans-Siberian Railway. It bears its name from the Kourov log ravine, named after Kour, peasant of the nearby Chusovaya sloboda who lived in late 17th century. In its turn, Kourovka is the namesake of a street in Yekaterinburg, a minor planet 4964 Kourovka and Kourovka Notebook, a set of open problems in group theory.

An Art Nouveau station building is the oldest building in Kourovka. Kourovka Astronomical Observatory is located near the settlement. In 1965 the first All-USSR Symposium on Group Theory has been hosted in Kourovka.
