= Luboš Perek =

Czech astronomist (1919–2020)

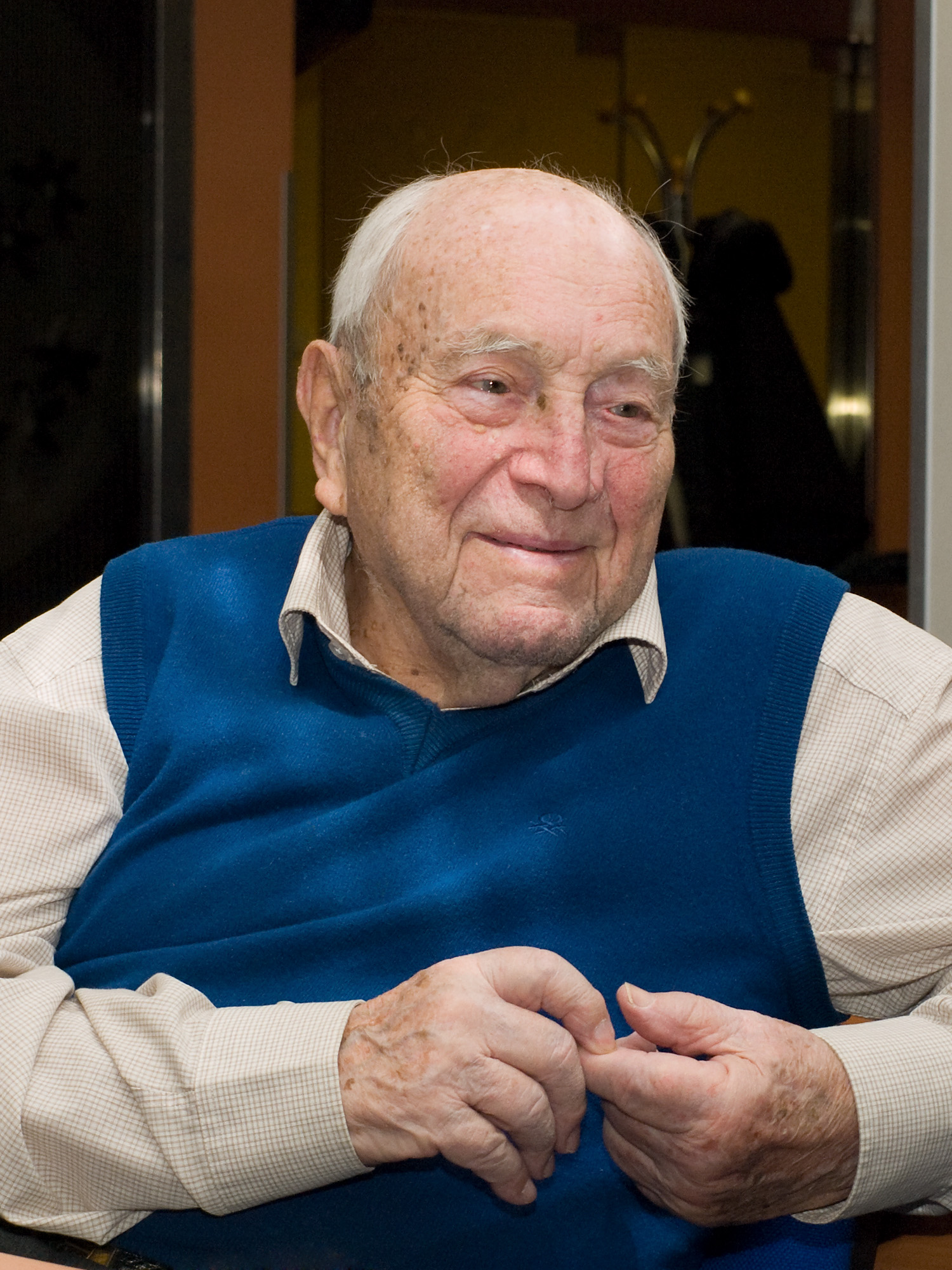
- Luboš Perek (2013)

Personal details
- Born: 26 July 1919 Prague, Czechoslovakia
- Died: 17 September 2020 (aged 101) Czech Republic
- Occupation: Astronomer
- Known for: Catalogue of Galactic Planetary Nebulae

Luboš Perek (26 July 1919 – 17 September 2020) was a Czech astronomer best known for his Catalogue of Galactic Planetary Nebulae co-written in 1967 with Luboš Kohoutek. He worked on the distribution of mass in the galaxy, high-velocity stars, planetary nebulae, definition of outer space, geostationary orbit, space debris, and management of outer space.

Perek graduated from Masaryk University, Brno, in 1946, earned his PhD in Astronomy from Charles University, Prague, in 1956, and earned his DSc in Astronomy in 1961. He published 44 papers on stellar dynamics and planetary nebulae and 80 papers and articles on the geostationary orbit, definition of outer space, space debris, and protection of space environment.

The asteroid 2900 Luboš Perek, discovered by his fellow astronomer Kohoutek, was named after him. The largest telescope in the Czech Republic was also named after Perek.

== Positions ==
- Corresponding Member of the Czechoslovak Academy of Sciences in 1965
- Associate Professor, Masaryk University from 1952 to 1956
- Visiting Professor, Northwestern University 1964
- General Secretary of the International Astronomical Union 1967–1970
- Director of the Astronomical Institute of Czechoslovak Academy of Sciences 1968–1975
- Chief, Outer Space Affairs Division, United Nations, New York City 1975–1980

== Medals ==
- University of Liège (1969)
- ADION (1972)
- T. Hagecius de Hajek (1980)
- Nagy Ernö (1981)
- Zagreb University (1982)
- City of Paris (1982)
- Collège de France (1986)
- Prix Jules Janssen of the Societé Astronomique de France (1992)
