= TD1 Catalog of Stellar Ultraviolet Fluxes =

In 1978, the TD1 Stellar Ultraviolet Flux Survey cataloged the ultraviolet flux of unreddened stars down to the 10th visual magnitude. The Ultraviolet Sky Survey Telescope on board the TD1 completed this full-sky survey. The star catalog survey was an ESRO project.

== Catalog History ==
The catalog can be found in the published version, Catalogue of stellar ultraviolet fluxes (TD1): A compilation of absolute stellar fluxes measured by the Sky Survey Telescope (S2/68) aboard the ESRO satellite TD-1, by the Science Research Council in 1978

== Scientific Impact ==
Since 1978, there have been 216 citations of this catalog in refereed journals.
