= General Catalogue of Stellar Radial Velocities =

The General Catalogue of Stellar Radial Velocities is a star catalogue which lists radial velocities for 15,107 stars. It was compiled by Ralph Elmer Wilson and published by the Carnegie Institution of Washington in 1953. Many of the velocity measurements were made at Mount Wilson Observatory.
