= Comet ATLAS =

Comet ATLAS may refer to any comets below discovered by the Asteroid Terrestrial-impact Last Alert System survey. The interstellar comet can be found at 3I/ATLAS (C/2025 N1). The Great Comet of 2024 can be found at Comet Tsuchinshan–ATLAS.

== Periodic comets ==
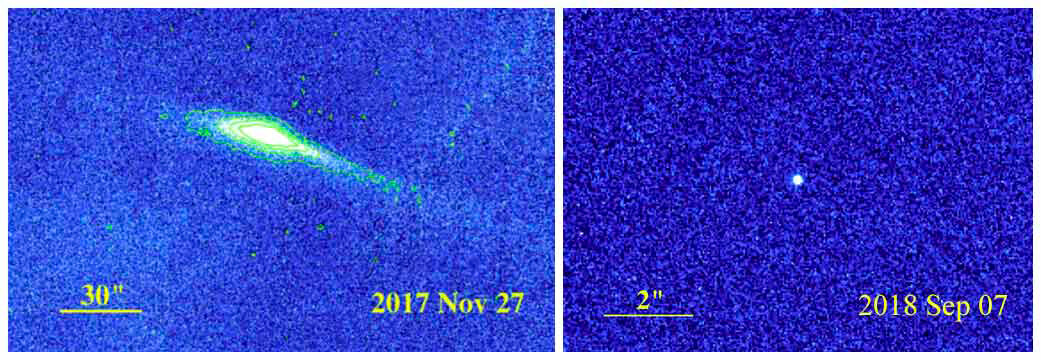
427P/ATLAS

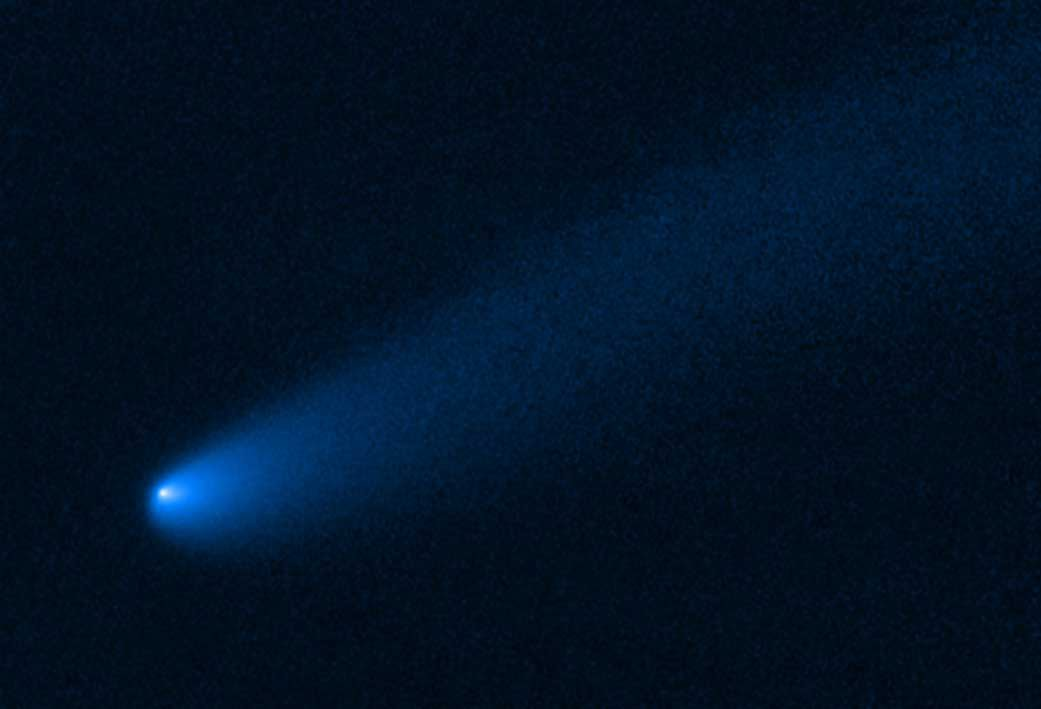
P/2019 LD2

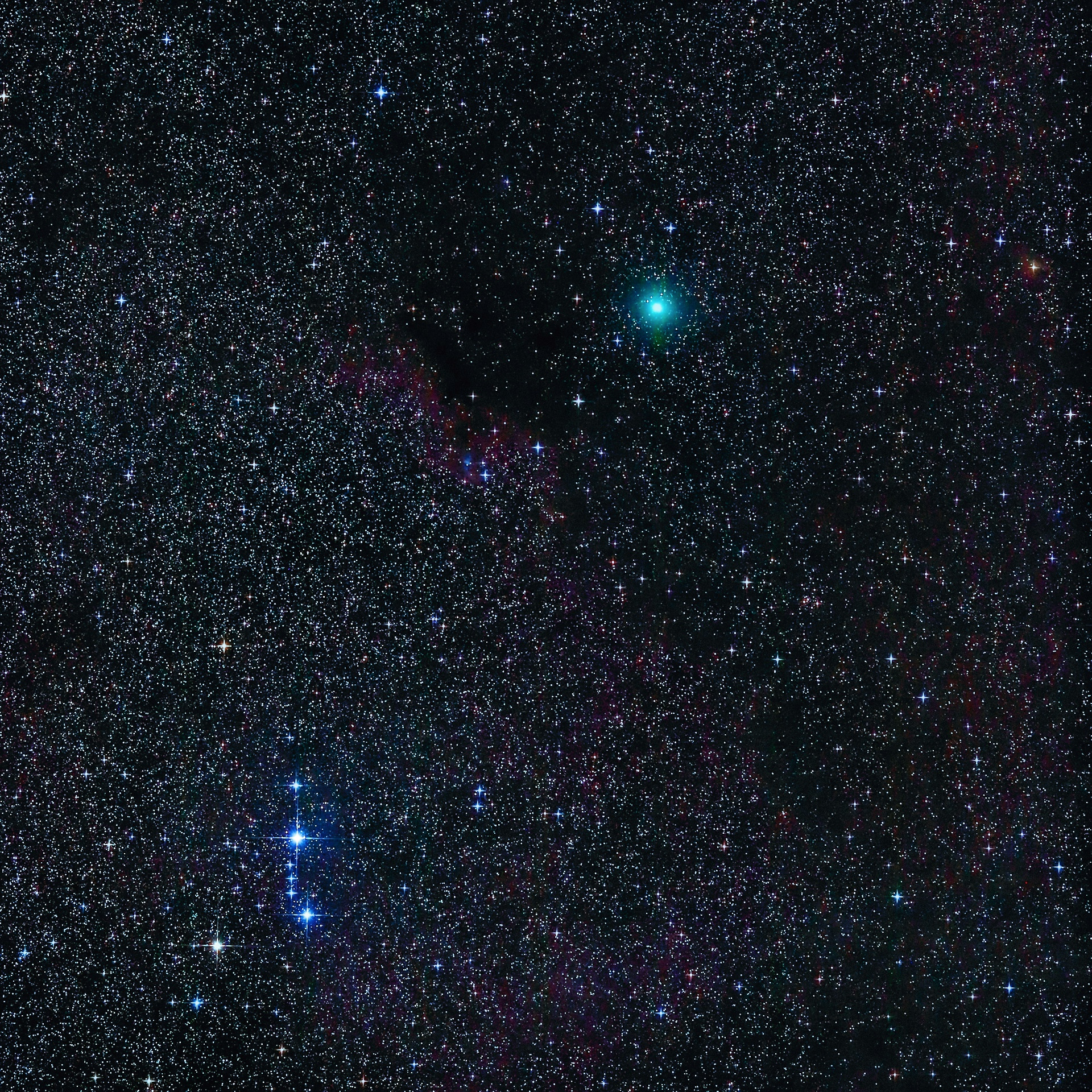
C/2020 M3

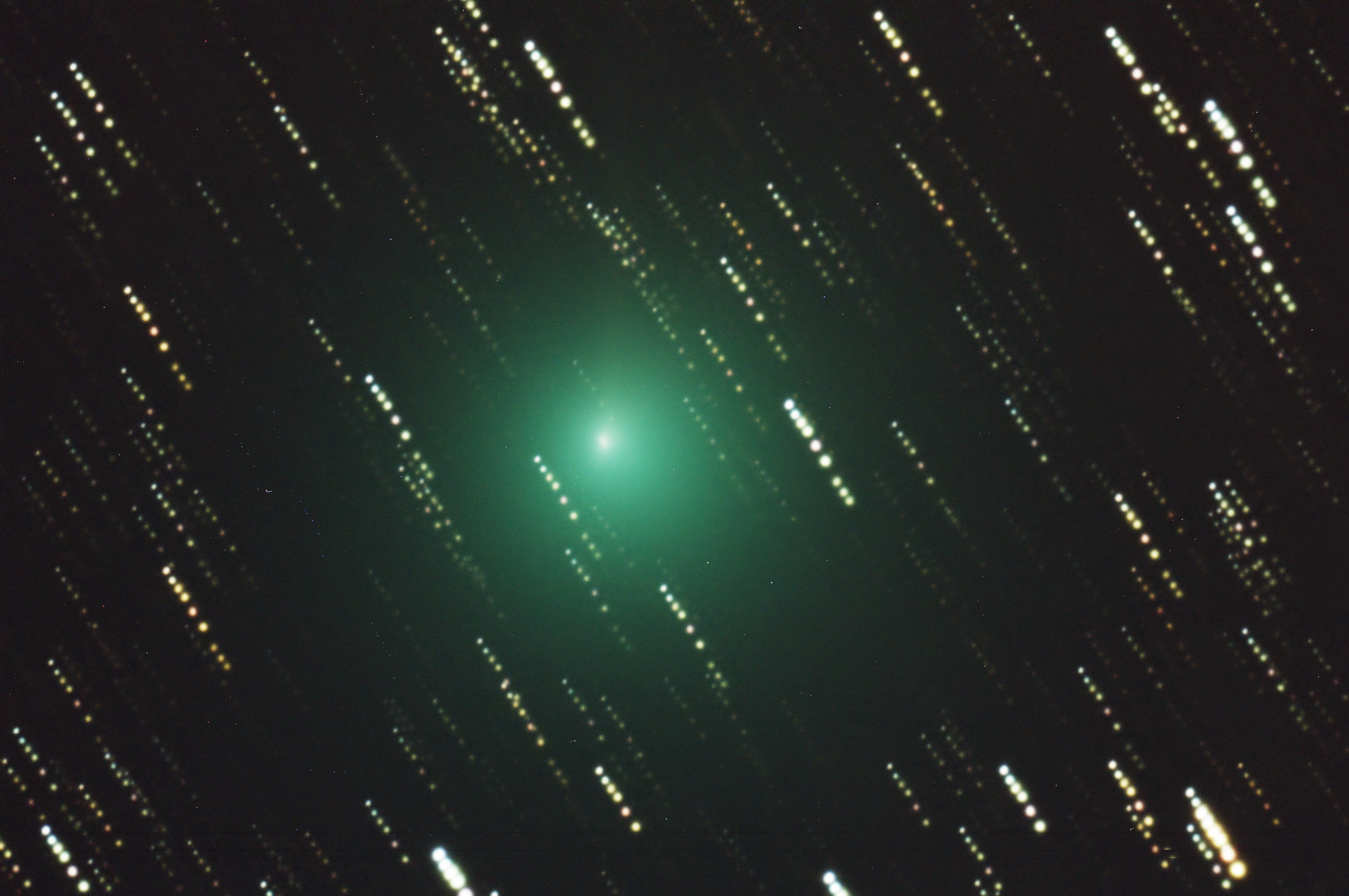
C/2023 E1

=== Encke-type Comets ===
- 427P/ATLAS

=== Jupiter-family comets ===
- 478P/ATLAS
- 490P/ATLAS
- P/2019 A2 (ATLAS)
- P/2019 LD_{2} (ATLAS)
- P/2020 X1 (ATLAS)
- P/2021 PE20 (ATLAS)
- P/2021 Q5 (ATLAS)
- P/2022 L3 (ATLAS)
- P/2023 M4 (ATLAS)
- P/2025 C1 (ATLAS)
- P/2025 D4 (ATLAS)
- P/2026 T1 (ATLAS)

=== Halley-type comets ===
- C/2017 K4 (ATLAS)
- C/2018 O1 (ATLAS)
- C/2018 V2 (ATLAS)
- C/2019 F2 (ATLAS)
- C/2019 T5 (ATLAS)
- C/2020 M3 (ATLAS)
- C/2020 X2 (ATLAS)
- P/2021 J3 (ATLAS)
- C/2021 K1 (ATLAS)
- C/2022 Q2 (ATLAS)
- C/2023 E1 (ATLAS)
- C/2023 RN_{3} (ATLAS)
- C/2024 A2 (ATLAS)
- C/2024 M1 (ATLAS)
- C/2025 W2 (ATLAS)

== Non-periodic comets ==
=== Long-period comets ===
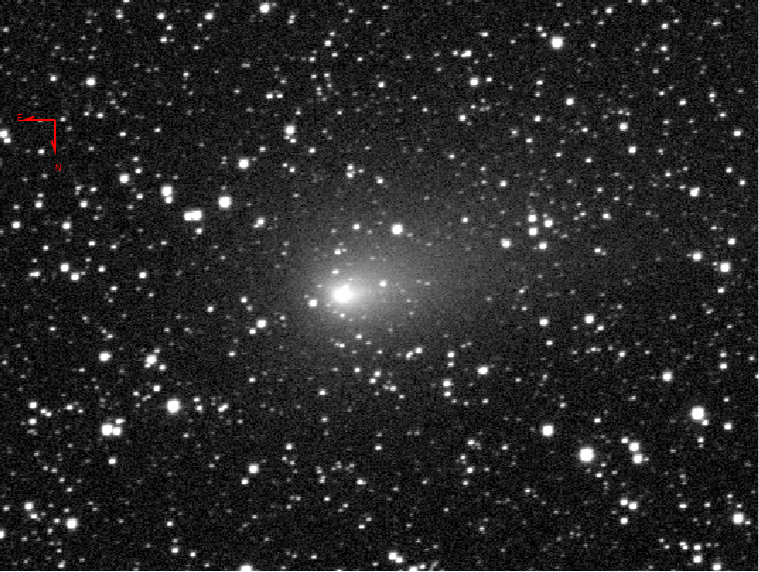
C/2020 R4

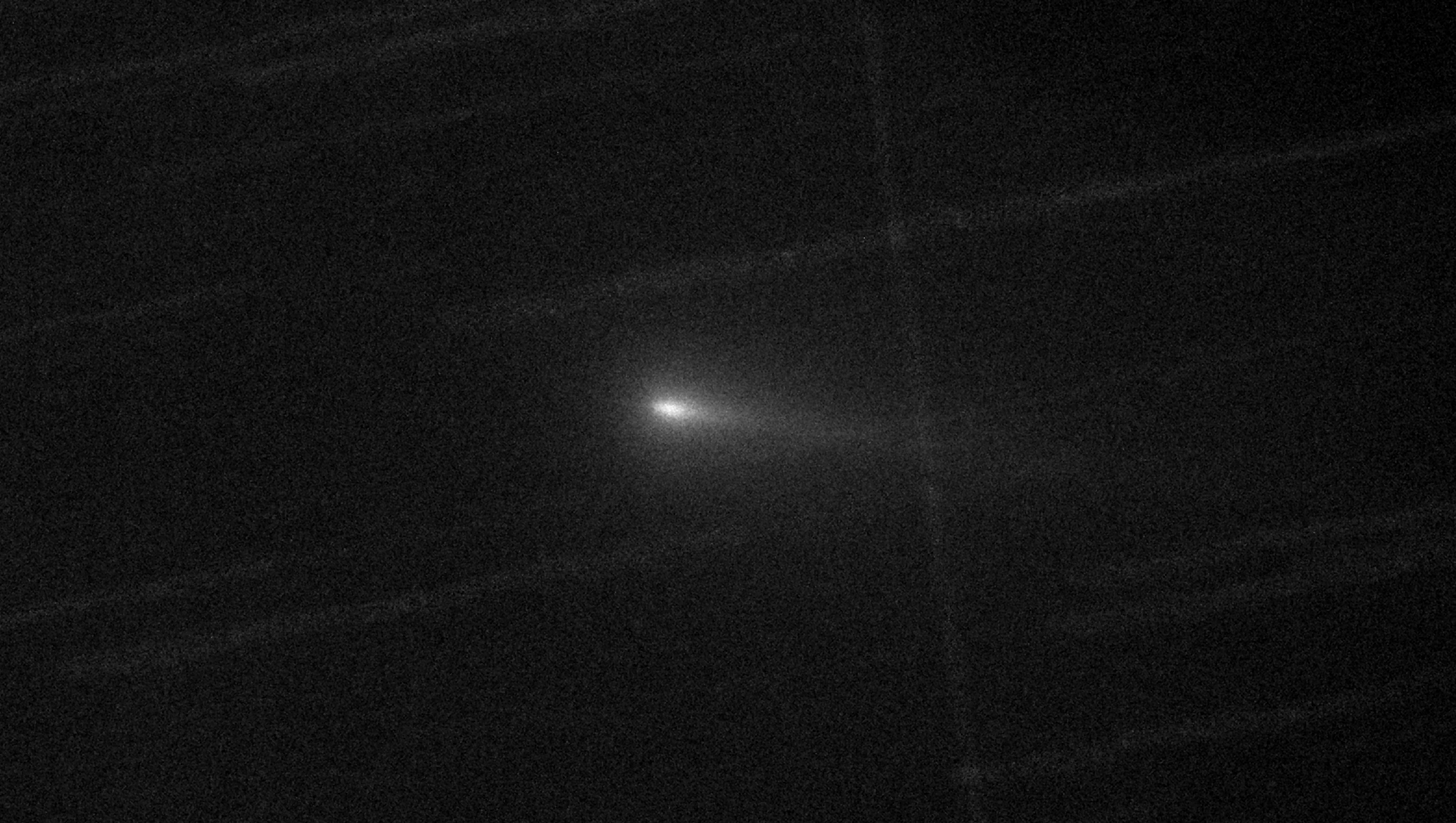
C/2024 S1

- C/2018 E1 (ATLAS)
- C/2020 R4 (ATLAS)
- C/2021 Q3 (ATLAS)
- C/2022 U2 (ATLAS)
- C/2024 C4 (ATLAS)
- C/2024 S1 (ATLAS), a Kreutz sungrazer comet
- C/2025 R1 (ATLAS)
- C/2026 Q1 (ATLAS)

=== Near-parabolic comets ===
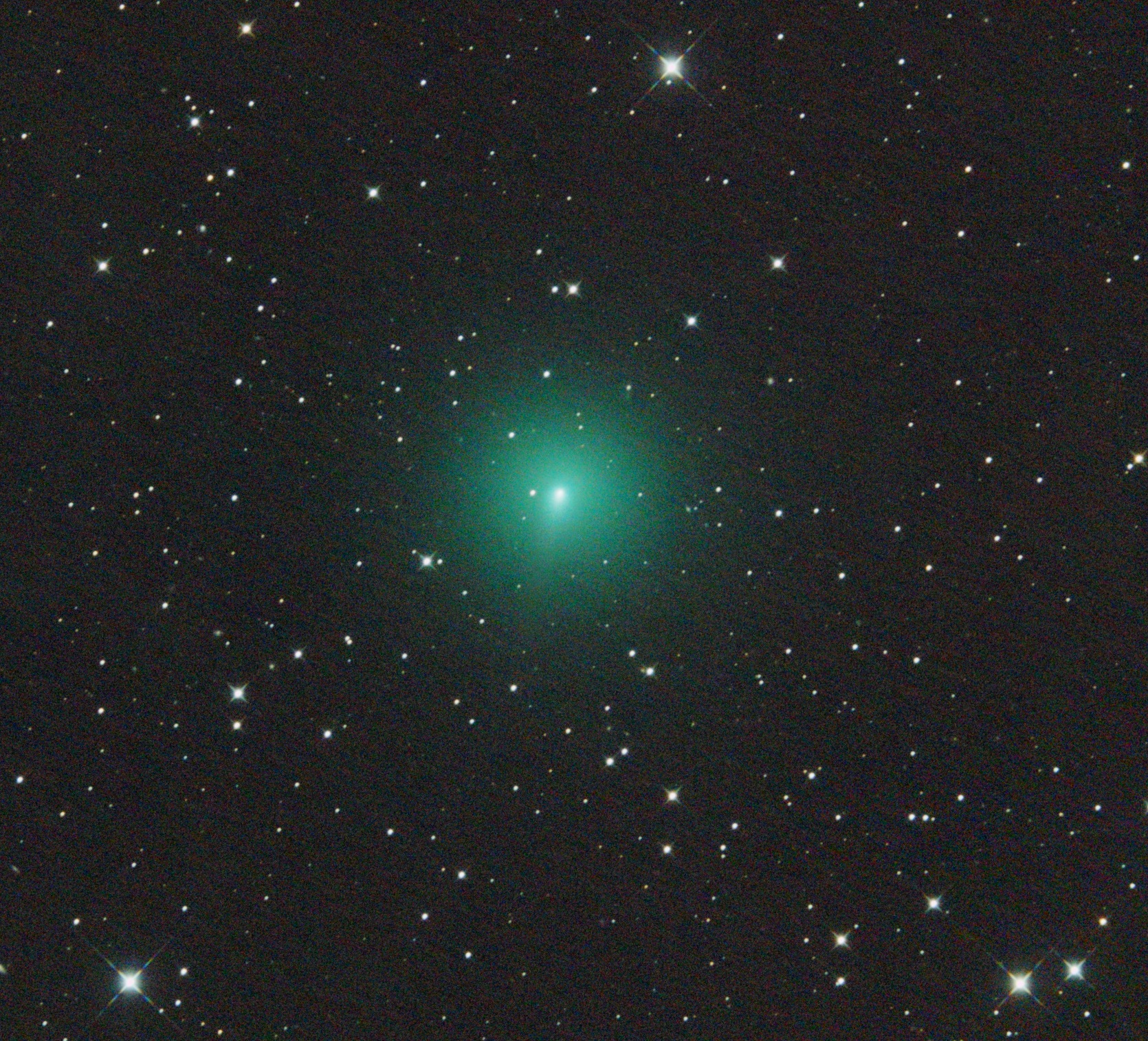
C/2019 Y4

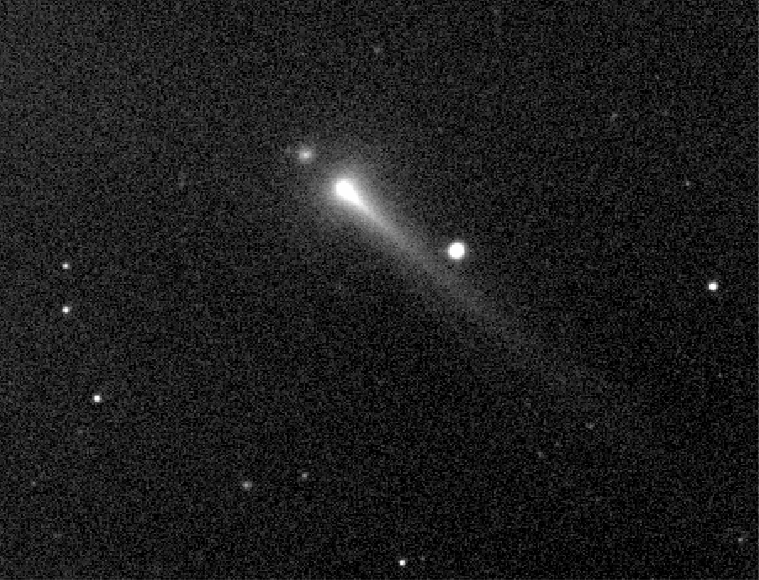
C/2022 R2

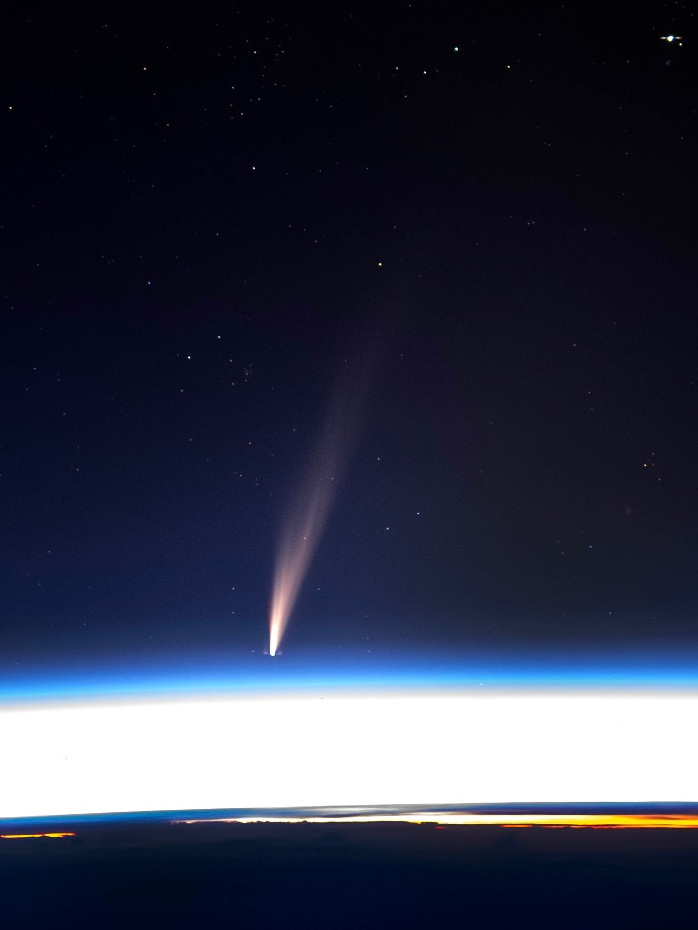
C/2024 G3

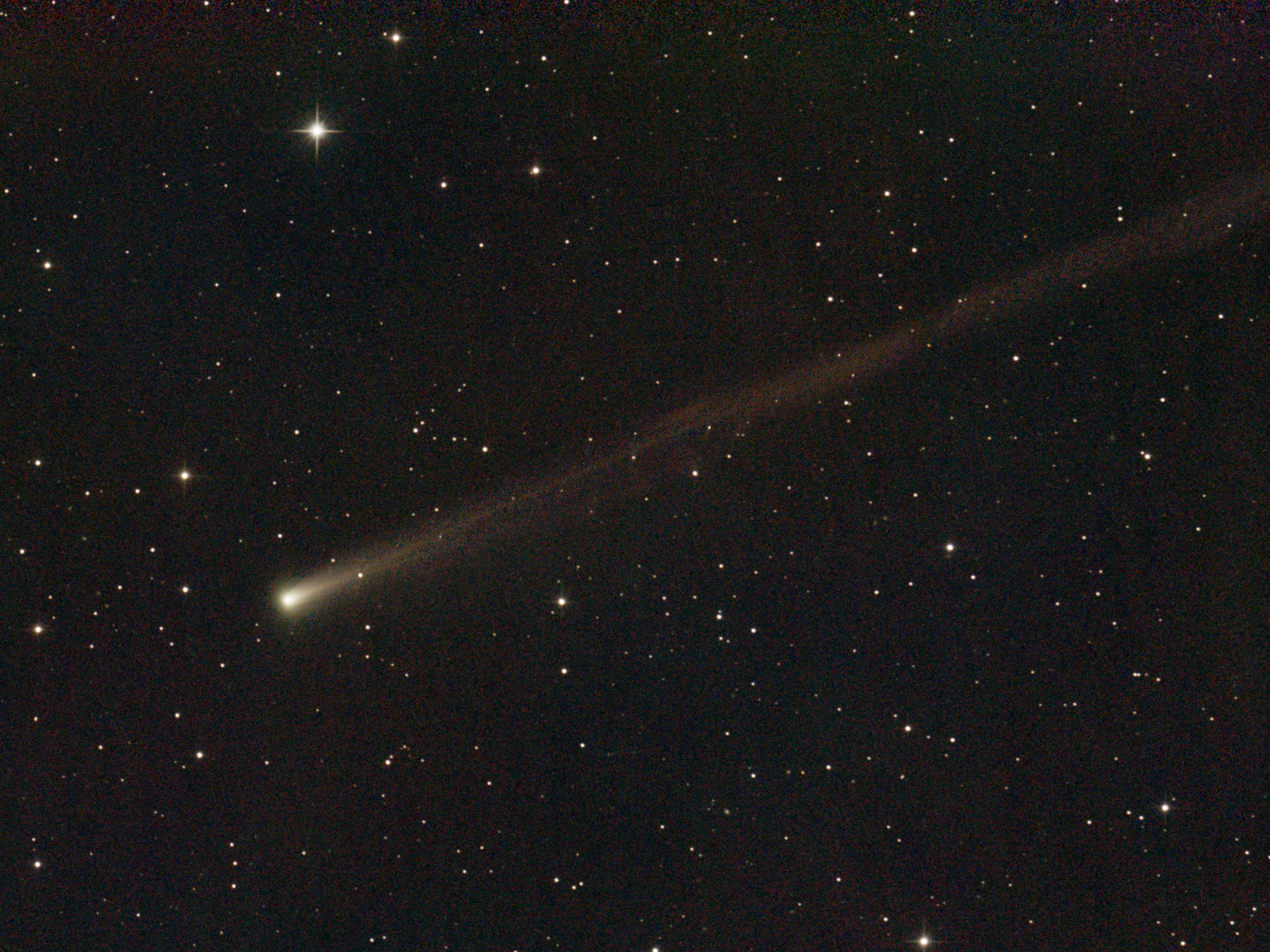
C/2025 K1

- C/2015 X7 (ATLAS)
- C/2017 D3 (ATLAS)
- C/2017 M4 (ATLAS)
- C/2017 T3 (ATLAS)
- C/2018 A3 (ATLAS)
- C/2018 L2 (ATLAS)
- C/2019 C1 (ATLAS)
- C/2019 E3 (ATLAS)
- C/2019 JU6 (ATLAS)
- C/2019 J3 (ATLAS)
- C/2019 K1 (ATLAS)
- C/2019 K8 (ATLAS)
- C/2019 L3 (ATLAS)
- C/2019 M3 (ATLAS)
- C/2019 N1 (ATLAS)
- C/2019 T3 (ATLAS)
- C/2019 T4 (ATLAS)
- C/2019 Y1 (ATLAS)
- C/2019 Y4 (ATLAS)
- C/2020 A3 (ATLAS)
- C/2020 F2 (ATLAS)
- C/2020 H6 (ATLAS)
- C/2020 M5 (ATLAS)
- C/2020 N2 (ATLAS)
- C/2020 P3 (ATLAS)
- C/2020 R7 (ATLAS)
- C/2020 Y2 (ATLAS)
- C/2020 Y3 (ATLAS)
- C/2021 C4 (ATLAS)
- C/2021 G2 (ATLAS)
- C/2021 P4 (ATLAS)
- C/2021 S1 (ATLAS)
- C/2021 Y1 (ATLAS)
- C/2022 E2 (ATLAS)
- C/2022 F1 (ATLAS)
- C/2022 L2 (ATLAS)
- C/2022 O1 (ATLAS)
- C/2022 QE78 (ATLAS)
- C/2022 R2 (ATLAS)
- C/2022 W2 (ATLAS)
- C/2023 B2 (ATLAS)
- C/2023 C2 (ATLAS)
- C/2023 F3 (ATLAS)
- C/2023 K1 (ATLAS)
- C/2023 S2 (ATLAS)
- C/2024 A1 (ATLAS)
- C/2024 G2 (ATLAS)
- C/2024 G3 (ATLAS), also known as the Great Comet of 2025
- C/2024 G6 (ATLAS)
- C/2024 G7 (ATLAS)
- C/2024 J3 (ATLAS)
- C/2024 T5 (ATLAS)
- C/2024 X2 (ATLAS)
- C/2025 D6 (ATLAS)
- C/2025 F1 (ATLAS)
- C/2025 K1 (ATLAS), fragmenting comet in Nov/Dec 2025
- C/2025 L1 (ATLAS)
- C/2025 N2 (ATLAS)
- C/2025 Q3 (ATLAS)
- C/2025 R1 (ATLAS)
- C/2025 R3 (ATLAS)
- C/2025 T1 (ATLAS)
- C/2025 Y1 (ATLAS)
- C/2026 S2 (ATLAS)

=== Hyperbolic comets ===
- C/2024 L5 (ATLAS), a comet that made a close encounter with Saturn in 2022

==== Interstellar objects ====
3I/ATLAS

- 3I/ATLAS (C/2025 N1), the third known interstellar object ever discovered passing through the Solar System

== Others ==
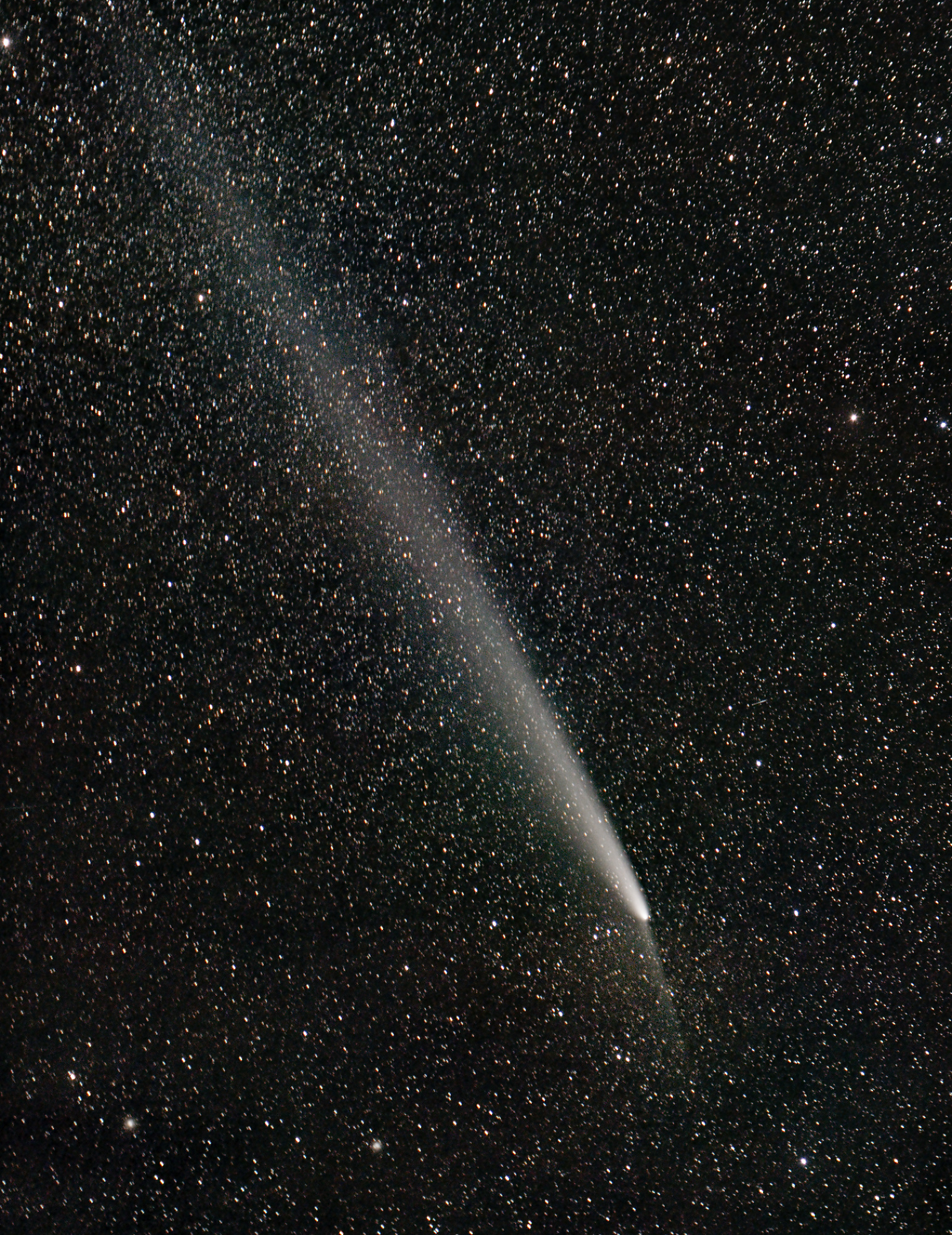
C/2023 A3

"Comet ATLAS" may also be an incomplete reference to a comet co-discovered by the Asteroid Terrestrial-impact Last Alert System survey. These include:

- C/2019 F1 (ATLAS–Africano)
- C/2020 K8 (Catalina–ATLAS)
- C/2022 A3 (Lemmon–ATLAS)
- C/2023 A3 (Tsuchinshan–ATLAS), also known as the Great Comet of 2024
