= List of Halley-type comets =

Comets with a period between 20 and 200 years

The following is a list of Halley-type comets (HTCs), which are periodic comets with an orbital period between 20 and 200 years, often appearing only once or twice within one's lifetime. The majority come from between the orbits of Saturn and Neptune. Due to the nature of their orbits, they can be perturbed by the giant planets and sent into orbits too far from the Sun to outgas, and vice versa. Minor planets in comet-like orbits similar to HTCs that never come close enough to the Sun to outgas are called centaurs. HTCs are named after the first discovered member, and the first discovered periodic comet, Halley's Comet, which orbits the Sun in about 75 years, and passing as far as the orbit of Neptune.

Most of the comets that have a period between 20 and 200 years (making them HTCs based on the classical definition) are actually officially classified as either Jupiter-family comets (JFCs) or Chiron-type comets (CTCs), based on their Jupiter Tisserand's parameter (T_{Jupiter}). Although JFCs are classically defined by (P < 20 y), they are officially defined by (2 < T_{Jupiter} < 3). CTCs, on the other hand, are officially defined by (T_{Jupiter} > 3; a > a_{Jupiter}). Since they do not include any period-related constraints, some of the 20–200 year-period comets match one of the classifications, making comet classifications even more vague.

== Numbered HTCs ==
For the 15 numbered HTCs, see the list of numbered comets, where they are labelled "HTC" in column "class".

== Unnumbered HTCs ==
This list contains only Halley-type comets which are not numbered yet because they have been observed only once. Comets that belong to a different comet classification based on its Jupiter Tisserand parameter are given its alternative classification next to the comets' name.

=== Before 2000 ===
Comet designation	Name/ discoverer(s)	Period (years)	e	a (AU)	q (AU)	i (°)	Abs. mag (M1)	Nucleus radii	Last observed perihelion	Next perihelion	Ref
C/1917 F1	Mellish	145	0.993121	27.6473325	0.190186	32.6828			1917/04/11	2062	MPC; JPL
C/1921 H1	Dubiago	70.8	0.9348	17.102	1.116	22.34			1921/05/04	2062	MPC; JPL
C/1937 D1	Wilk	187	0.981098	32.7445244	0.618937	26.0205			1937/02/21	2124	MPC; JPL
C/1942 EA	Väisälä	85.4	0.933639	19.3951116	1.287079	37.9961			1942/02/15	2027/07/10	MPC; JPL
C/1984 A1	Bradfield 1	152.3	0.9524	28.5	1.35751	51.8005	9.6		1983/12/27	2136/04/01	MPC; JPL
C/1989 A3	Bradfield	81.9	0.977708	18.853	0.420271	83.0672			1988/12/05	2070/11/01	MPC; JPL
C/1991 L3	Levy	51.28	0.928811	13.8018	0.982545	19.19031	8.8	8.2 km	1991/07/08	2042/10/19	MPC; JPL
C/1998 G1	LINEAR	42.08	0.8237	12.099	2.1333	109.714	10.8		1998/11/16	2040/12/15	MPC; JPL
C/1998 Y1	LINEAR	110	0.9239	22.956	1.74699	28.1082	14		1998/11/21	2108/11/15	MPC; JPL
C/1999 E1	Li	66.06	0.76011	16.341	3.92002	46.88108	8.3		1998/01/31	2065/02/21	MPC; JPL
C/1999 G1	LINEAR	149	0.856	28.1	4.048	76.55	8		1998/08/01	2150	MPC; JPL
C/1999 K4	LINEAR	70	0.92	20	1.442	120.8	18.5		1999/05/16	2069/06/08	MPC; JPL
C/1999 S3	LINEAR	82.43	0.89995	18.94	1.894939	70.5607	4.9		1999/11/09	2081/04/04	MPC; JPL
C/1999 XS_{87}	LINEAR (*JFC)	72.5	0.84057	17.386	2.7718	14.8464	10.9		1999/08/06	2072/02/04	MPC; JPL

=== 2000s ===
Comet designation	Name/ discoverer(s)	Period (years)	e	a (AU)	q (AU)	i (°)	Abs. mag (M1)	Nucleus radii	Last observed perihelion	Next perihelion	Ref
C/2000 D2	LINEAR	72	0.867	17.2	2.2975	156.992	13.7		2000/03/08	2072	MPC; JPL
C/2000 G2	LINEAR	52	0.805	14	2.716	170.4785	12.8		2000/02/05	2052	MPC; JPL
C/2000 S3	LONEOS (*JFC)	39.97	0.7723	11.69	2.6622	25.164	6.4		2000/07/16	2040/07/10	MPC; JPL
C/2001 M10	NEAT (*JFC)	137.63	0.80107	26.657	5.30275	28.08349	9.4	12 km	2001/06/21	2139/02/01	MPC; JPL
C/2001 OG_{108}	LONEOS	48.5	0.9252595	13.3	0.9940479	80.24505	13.2	7.6 km	2002/03/15	2050/09/13	MPC; JPL
C/2001 W2	BATTeRS	75.89	0.94136	17.925	1.051065	115.9131	12.1		2001/12/23	2077/11/15	MPC; JPL
C/2002 A1	LINEAR (*JFC)	70.04	0.72281	16.992	4.70996	14.03393	8.6		2001/11/26	2071/12/11	MPC; JPL
C/2002 A2	LINEAR (*JFC)	70.74	0.72482	17.103	4.70659	14.0386	7.5	11.6 km	2001/12/05	2072/09/01	MPC; JPL
C/2002 B1	LINEAR	31.24	0.77102	9.9183	2.27113	51.0214	6.3		2002/04/20	2032/06/17	MPC; JPL
C/2002 CE_{10}	LINEAR	30.75	0.791486	9.81595	2.0467593	145.4587	10.8	8.95 km	2003/06/22	2034/03/23	MPC; JPL
C/2002 K4	NEAT	73.41	0.84232	17.532	2.76453	94.0632	11.4		2002/07/12	2075/12/01	MPC; JPL
C/2003 E1	NEAT (*JFC)	50.86	0.76359	13.7263	3.245004	33.53785	10.6		2004/02/13	2054/12/24	MPC; JPL
C/2003 F1	LINEAR	93.93	0.80605	20.664	4.007806	70.2216	8.3		2003/06/28	2097/06/02	MPC; JPL
C/2003 R1	LINEAR	87.44	0.89331	19.7	2.10188	149.19563	12.7		2003/06/29	2090/12/15	MPC; JPL
C/2003 U1	LINEAR	109.6	0.9216	22.9	1.79572	164.4745	15.2		2003/11/03	2113	MPC; JPL
C/2003 W1	LINEAR	126.1	0.93429	25.15	1.65241	78.0756	13.5		2003/11/09	2130	MPC; JPL
C/2004 C1	Larsen (*JFC)	39.33	0.6231	11.566	4.3594	28.918	10		2003/03/19	2042/09/01	MPC; JPL
P/2004 V5-A	LINEAR–Hill (*JFC)	22.42	0.445217	7.95059	4.410853	19.358136	8.8	1.7 km	2005/02/28	2027/07/31	MPC; JPL
P/2004 V5-B	LINEAR–Hill (*JFC)	22.42	0.445233	7.95092	4.41091	19.35822	9.2	9.2 km	2005/03/01	2027/08/02	MPC; JPL
C/2005 N5	Catalina	153.65	0.94327	28.687	1.6274	21.37879	12.9		2005/08/22	2159/01/01	MPC; JPL
C/2005 O2	Christensen	115.43	0.85939	23.707	3.33358	148.89204	5.2		2005/09/08	2121/02/15	MPC; JPL
P/2005 S2	Skiff (*CTC)	22.48	0.1967	7.965	6.398	3.141	7.9		2006/06/30	2028/12/22	MPC; JPL
P/2005 T3	Read (*CTC)	20.58	0.174	7.509	6.202	6.26	9.2		2006/01/13	2026/08/15	MPC; JPL
P/2005 T4	SWAN	28.4	0.93	9.3	0.649399	160.0362	15.4		2005/10/10	2034	MPC; JPL
C/2005 W2	Christensen (*JFC)	82.68	0.82446	18.979	3.33162	11.26403	10.8	0.52 km	2006/03/27	2096/12/01	MPC; JPL
C/2006 F2	Christensen (*JFC)	43.27	0.65138	12.324	4.2965	20.511	10.6		2006/05/30	2049/09/06	MPC; JPL
P/2006 HR30: P/2026 M4	Siding Spring	21.86	0.8431184	7.81754	1.2264277	31.884499	11.7	8 km	2007/01/02	2028/11/12	MPC; JPL
C/2006 U7	Gibbs (*JFC)	41.51	0.6309	11.99	4.425	57.762	11.6		2007/03/28	2048/10/01	MPC; JPL
C/2007 S2	Lemmon (*JFC)	44.45	0.557056	12.5477	5.557931	16.86305	9	0.5 km	2008/09/14	2053/02/25	MPC; JPL
C/2008 E1	Catalina (*JFC)	34.94	0.54815	10.687	4.82891	35.03769	9.1	4.8 km	2008/08/11	2043/07/31	MPC; JPL
P/2008 O3	Boattini (*JFC)	23.42	0.6949	8.186	2.4973	32.2699	5.1		2008/06/03	2031/11/03	MPC; JPL
C/2008 R3	LINEAR	79.11	0.89641	18.428	1.909035	43.23793	13.5		2008/11/22	2088/01/01	MPC; JPL
P/2008 Y3	McNaught (*JFC)	22.75	0.44766	8.0281	4.434241	38.81318	8.7	3.55 km	2009/01/11	2031/10/12	MPC; JPL
P/2009 O3	Hill (*JFC)	21.89	0.68688	7.8244	2.44999	16.2176	12		2009/05/18	2031/04/08	MPC; JPL
P/2009 Q5	McNaught (*JFC)	20.4	0.609061	7.4654	2.91851	40.9048	10.5		2009/09/08	2030/02/02	MPC; JPL
P/2009 T2	La Sagra (*JFC)	20.94	0.768991	7.596	1.75475	28.10639	14.2	1.16 km	2010/01/12	2030/12/21	MPC; JPL

=== 2010s ===
Comet designation	Name/ discoverer(s)	Period (years)	e	a (AU)	q (AU)	i (°)	Abs. mag (M1)	Nucleus radii	Last observed perihelion	Next perihelion	Ref
P/2010 E2	Jarnac (*JFC)	25.4	0.72237	8.6402	2.39874	15.437	14.4	0.76 km	2010/04/07	2035/08/31	MPC; JPL
C/2010 E5	Scotti (*JFC)	122.96	0.84274	24.73	3.8884	18.9102	6.1		2009/11/21	2132/11/01	MPC; JPL
P/2010 J3	McMillan (*JFC)	26.94	0.72682	8.9871	2.45511	13.25507	11.6	1.455 km	2010/08/23	2037/08/01	MPC; JPL
P/2010 JC_{81}	WISE	23.19	0.77735	8.13307	1.8108311	38.69025	10.3	7.85 km	2011/04/26	2034/07/04	MPC; JPL
C/2010 L5	WISE	23.6	0.904	8.2	0.7909	147.052	17.4	1.1 km	2010/04/23	2033	MPC; JPL
C/2011 J3	LINEAR	86.5	0.9258	19.56	1.451	114.7124	13.1		2011/01/24	2097	MPC; JPL
P/2011 JB_{15}	Spacewatch–Boattini	20	0.31874	7.3668	5.01871	19.14127	5.5		2012/01/21	2032/01/21	MPC; JPL
C/2011 L1	McNaught	36.66	0.79678	11.034	2.24237	65.512	10.6		2010/12/18	2047/08/15	MPC; JPL
P/2011 P1	McNaught (*JFC)	21.54	0.3598	7.741	4.9556	6.1741	8.2		2010/07/22	2032/02/04	MPC; JPL
C/2011 P2	PanSTARRS (*CTC)	30.47	0.36982	9.7562	6.1481	8.98964	6.7		2010/09/13	2041/03/04	MPC; JPL
P/2011 S1	Gibbs (*CTC)	25.46	0.20305	8.6545	6.8972	2.6792	5.5	4 km	2014/08/20	2040/02/04	MPC; JPL
C/2011 S2	Kowalski	65.83	0.9316	16.304	1.115118	17.57253	14.8		2011/10/26	2077/08/25	MPC; JPL
C/2011 Y3	Boattini (*JFC)	40.82	0.705	11.85	3.4978	26.517	11.7		2011/08/22	2052/06/17	MPC; JPL
C/2012 BJ_{98}	Lemmon (*JFC)	70.52	0.87365	17.068	2.156577	2.6369	8.1		2012/09/20	2083/03/29	MPC; JPL
P/2012 C3	PanSTARRS (*JFC)	30.2	0.6264	9.7	3.625	9.19	13.5		2011/10/05	2042	MPC; JPL
C/2012 H2	McNaught	64.9	0.8936	16.14	1.71678	92.8355	15.7		2012/05/03	2077	MPC; JPL
P/2012 NJ	La Sagra	24.79	0.848062	8.5027	1.2918901	84.37546	13.1	0.194 km	2012/06/13	2037/03/28	MPC; JPL
C/2012 Q1	Kowalski (*JFC)	133.63	0.63722	26.138	9.48222	45.181	4.7	12 km	2012/02/09	2145/10/01	MPC; JPL
C/2012 T6	Kowalski	54.38	0.87634	14.354	1.77509	33.2755	15.7		2012/08/26	2067/01/15	MPC; JPL
C/2012 X2	PanSTARRS (*JFC)	94.12	0.77052	20.69	4.74816	34.12389	9.6		2013/03/31	2107/05/14	MPC; JPL
C/2012 Y3	McNaught	159.3	0.93993	29.38	1.76482	73.2318	10.4		2012/08/25	2172	MPC; JPL
C/2013 C2	Tenagra (*CTC)	64.01	0.4293	16.001	9.1321	21.34426	4.4		2015/08/28	2080/09/01	MPC; JPL
C/2013 D1	Holvorcem (*JFC)	37.62	0.78088	11.227	2.46013	10.09356	13.5		2013/04/13	2050/11/25	MPC; JPL
P/2013 N3	PanSTARRS (*JFC)	20.26	0.5924	7.431	3.0289	2.17041	6.6		2014/02/11	2034/05/17	MPC; JPL
P/2013 P1	PanSTARRS (*JFC)	25.17	0.6053	8.588	3.3902	18.702	11.6		2013/02/26	2038/04/29	MPC; JPL
C/2013 P4	PanSTARRS (*CTC)	56.84	0.59636	14.783	5.96703	4.26425	5.1		2014/08/12	2071/06/15	MPC; JPL
C/2013 U1	Catalina (*JFC)	41.17	0.7971	11.92	2.4188	23.9415	13.9		2013/11/18	2055/01/01	MPC; JPL
C/2013 V3	Nevsky	45.36	0.89097	12.718	1.386693	32.1345	15.2		2013/10/29	2059/03/09	MPC; JPL
C/2013 W2	PanSTARRS (*JFC)	32.23	0.561	10.13	4.448	4.5436	5.8		2015/01/08	2047/03/15	MPC; JPL
C/2014 F3	Sheppard–Trujillo (*JFC)	66	0.65	16.3	5.7	6.48	6.1		2021/04/17	2087	MPC; JPL
C/2014 HU_{195}	Valdes–TOTAS (*JFC)	102.25	0.76580	21.867	5.12113	5.82227	14.6		2015/05/18	2117/08/14	MPC; JPL
C/2014 J1	Catalina	25.4	0.802	8.64	1.7085	159.696	16.8		2014/06/20	2039	MPC; JPL
P/2014 L3	Hill (*JFC)	23.36	0.77309	8.1706	1.85396	6.264	13.7		2014/06/28	2037/11/06	MPC; JPL
P/2014 O3	PanSTARRS (*JFC)	20.72	0.3847	7.544	4.642	7.81	10.4		2014/04/16	2035/01/04	MPC; JPL
C/2014 Q3	Borisov	151.64	0.94207	28.436	1.647408	89.94888	8.8	0.955 km	2014/11/19	2166/07/10	MPC; JPL
C/2014 TG_{64}	Catalina (*JFC)	22.283	0.7824	14.89	3.24	3.2391	6.4		2014/05/26	2072	MPC; JPL
C/2014 W7	Christensen	38	0.869	11.3	1.4881	98.314	16.3		2014/12/31	2052	MPC; JPL
C/2014 W9	PanSTARRS	37.28	0.8577	11.16	1.5874	10.6302	15.5	1.255 km	2015/02/15	2052/04/01	MPC; JPL
C/2014 W11	PanSTARRS (*JFC)	30.67	0.650255	9.7980	3.426805	12.70679	8.8	26.91 km	2015/06/17	2036/04/16	MPC; JPL
C/2015 A1	PanSTARRS	90.24	0.900816	20.119	1.995505	80.36576	6.9	0.975 km	2015/03/13	2105/06/09	MPC; JPL
P/2015 A3	PanSTARRS	21	0.85	7.6	1.154	172.51	20.2		2015/02/22	2036	MPC; JPL
P/2015 B1	PanSTARRS (*JFC)	30.10	0.38250	9.6772	5.97567	18.027	8.7		2015/09/19	2045/10/26	MPC; JPL
P/2015 B4	Lemmon–PanSTARRS (*JFC)	25.72	0.56894	8.7121	3.75540	1.74262	11.7		2015/02/17	2030/12/04	MPC; JPL
C/2015 D2	PanSTARRS (*JFC)	46.79	0.56826	12.985	5.6060	31.8339	6.3		2013/09/27	2060/07/13	MPC; JPL
C/2015 D5	Kowalski (*JFC)	27.66	0.4996	9.145	4.576	20.3990	6.0		2014/04/16	2041/12/12	MPC; JPL
C/2015 F5	SWAN–XingMing	60.9	0.97764	15.47	0.345995	149.2590	17.6		2015/03/28	2075/02/01	MPC; JPL
C/2015 GX	PanSTARRS	65.13	0.878198	16.1883	1.971753	90.25454	14.4	2.45 km	2015/08/26	2080/10/09	MPC; JPL
C/2015 H1	Bressi	185.5	0.94078	32.53	1.92636	140.65558	6.6	2.025 km	2015/03/28	2200/10/07	MPC; JPL
P/2015 Q2	Pimentel	20.16	0.7544	7.407	1.81912	146.2022	15.3		2015/09/10	2035/11/06	MPC; JPL
C/2015 T5	Sheppard–Tholen (*CTC)	147.9	0.6661	27.97	9.3383	11.0483	7.7		2016/01/24	2164	MPC; JPL
C/2015 V4	PanSTARRS	79.89	0.70567	18.550	5.45972	60.7513	8.7		2016/08/27	2096/07/19	MPC; JPL
C/2015 X2	PanSTARRS	62.5	0.8791	15.75	1.90456	72.458	16.1		2015/12/20	2078/06/25	MPC; JPL
C/2015 X4	Elenin (*JFC)	77.23	0.812807	18.1345	3.39466	29.50491	10.1		2015/11/03	2093/02/14	MPC; JPL
C/2015 X8	NEOWISE	86.9	0.9393	19.6	1.1903	155.2817	14.1	0.99 km	2015/10/23	2099/09/13	MPC; JPL
C/2015 YG_{1}	NEOWISE	71.14	0.87924	17.169	2.07341	57.3360	12.3	4.68 km	2015/09/28	2086/11/17	MPC; JPL
P/2016 A3	PanSTARRS (*JFC)	21.36	0.3778	7.6979	4.7895	8.5929	5.4		2017/04/13	2038/08/22	MPC; JPL
C/2016 Q4	Kowalski (*CTC)	68.8	0.5781	16.79	7.084	7.2567	7.0		2018/01/28	2086	MPC; JPL
C/2016 S1	PanSTARRS	23.85	0.70887	8.285	2.41193	94.6898	7.5	2.6 km	2017/03/16	2041/01/20	MPC; JPL
P/2016 WM_{48}	Lemmon	23.46	0.7867	8.1954	1.7480	117.5476	16.8	1.07 km	2017/02/26	2040	MPC; JPL
C/2017 C1	NEOWISE	92.08	0.9263697	20.7832	1.50172	65.73154		0.365 km	2017/01/19	2109	MPC; JPL
P/2017 D4	PanSTARRS (*JFC)	20.23	0.62898	7.424	2.7545	10.3396	12.7		2016/09/06	2036/11/29	MPC; JPL
C/2017 E2	Tsuchinshan	100.09	0.89085	21.5567	2.35295	79.1686	11.3		2016/05/12	2116/06/14	MPC; JPL
P/2017 G1	PanSTARRS (*JFC)	21.53	0.66134	7.7387	2.621	3.534	13.1		2016/05/14	2037/11/23	MPC; JPL
P/2017 G2	PanSTARRS	23.22	0.65031	8.1394	2.846	47.90625	12.9		2017/06/13	2040/09/02	MPC; JPL
C/2017 K4	ATLAS (*JFC)	148.87	0.90571	28.0883	2.64824	16.67822	7.2		2018/01/08	2167	MPC; JPL
P/2017 P1	PanSTARRS (*JFC)	22.06	0.3088	7.86566	5.43665	7.7013	10.1		2018/06/18	2040/07/10	MPC; JPL
C/2017 S2	PanSTARRS (*JFC)	93.09	0.82406	20.5400	3.613	12.67723	13.2		2017/08/28	2110	MPC; JPL
C/2017 U5	PanSTARRS (*JFC)	69.72	0.74457	16.939	4.32676	18.9566	11.8		2017/12/19	2087/09/07	MPC; JPL
C/2017 W2	Leonard	50.81	0.7115	13.7176	3.958	98.1831	10.9		2017/11/02	2068	MPC; JPL
P/2017 W3	Gibbs (*JFC)	21.51	0.5039	7.734	3.8373	18.317	10.5		2018/02/25	2039/08/30	MPC; JPL
C/2017 X1	PanSTARRS (*JFC)	175.19	0.8511	31.3092	4.6624	31.3106	9.6		2018/06/14	2193	MPC; JPL
P/2017 Y3	Leonard	30.86	0.8703	9.838	1.2753	27.5859	13.6		2018/02/11	2049	MPC; JPL
C/2018 A1	PanSTARRS	131.18	0.9061	25.8169	2.4233	53.6213	13.1		2017/10/20	2148	MPC; JPL
C/2018 A6	Gibbs	72.80	0.8273	17.434	3.011	77.454	8.9	24.685 km	2019/07/08	2092	MPC; JPL
C/2018 DO_{4}	Lemmon	131.40	0.9069	29.847	2.406	160.475	13.7	4.39 km	2019/08/18	2151	MPC; JPL
C/2018 K1	Weiland	163.42	0.9371	29.890	1.879	164.193	11.9	1.665 km	2018/04/06	2182	MPC; JPL
C/2018 M1	Catalina	103.81	0.9409	22.087	1.304	37.265	15.9	1.37 km	2018/07/10	2122	MPC; JPL
C/2018 O1	ATLAS	147.09	0.944	27.864	1.558	154.041	12.6		2018/08/31	2165	MPC; JPL
C/2018 R5	Lemmon	109.55	0.8418	22.8947	3.6213	103.76	6		2019/01/09	2128	MPC; JPL
C/2018 S2	TESS	53.55	0.6149	14.206	5.471	64.220	6.7		2018/11/05	2072	MPC; JPL
C/2018 V2	ATLAS	129.65	0.9034	25.616	2.475	159.111	14.5		2018/11/26	2148	MPC; JPL
C/2018 W1	Catalina	101.64	0.938	21.779	1.36	83.273	15.648	1.69 km	2019/05/11	2120	MPC; JPL
C/2018 X3	PanSTARRS	43.75	0.783	12.41686	2.69887	43.368	15.5		2018/12/30	2062	MPC; JPL
P/2018 Y2	Africano (*JFC)	20.72	0.4878	7.543	3.8635	11.48886	11		2018/12/13	2039	MPC; JPL
C/2019 A5	PanSTARRS	100.81	0.7080	21.6608	6.3242	67.5310	9.4		2019/06/09	2119	MPC; JPL
C/2019 L1	PanSTARRS (*JFC)	30.90	0.7065	9.8474	2.88986	9.993	13.6		2019/08/11	2050	MPC; JPL
C/2019 L2	NEOWISE	130.48	0.9370	25.72	1.622	152.19	10.3		2019/04/02	2149	MPC; JPL
C/2019 LB_{7}	Kleyna	208.14	0.9293	35.1204	2.483	164.23	18.1		2019/03/27	2227	MPC; JPL
C/2019 T5	ATLAS	22.69	0.8092	8.014	1.5289	33.42	14.9		2019/08/01	2042	MPC; JPL
P/2019 V2	Gröller (*JFC)	20.63	0.333	7.523	5.0183	11.8	9.8		2020/10/21	2041	MPC; JPL
C/2019 Y4-D	ATLAS	111.65	0.9888	23.187	0.2589	44.02	14.5		2020/05/31	2132	MPC; JPL
C/2019 Y4-E	ATLAS	87.94	0.987	19.775	0.2525	45.085	16.3		2020/05/31	2108	MPC; JPL

=== 2020s ===
Comet designation	Name/ discoverer(s)	Period (years)	e	a (AU)	q (AU)	i (°)	Abs. mag (M1)	Nucleus radii	Last observed perihelion	Next perihelion	Ref
P/2020 A4	PanSTARRS–Lemmon (*JFC)	23.52	0.6537	8.208	2.843	24.99	15.6		2019/11/22	2043	MPC; JPL
C/2020 M3	ATLAS	138.88	0.9527	26.817	1.268	23.474	14.6	1.135 km	2020/10/25	2159	MPC; JPL
C/2020 Q2	PanSTARRS (*JFC)	36.10	0.5055	10.9231	5.402	3.310	10.9		2020/02/07	2056	MPC; JPL
C/2020 S2	PanSTARRS	32.48	0.8275	10.1793	1.756	22.3978	16.3	1.17 km	2020/12/21	2052	MPC; JPL
P/2020 V3	PanSTARRS (*JFC)	24.17	0.2547	8.36	6.23	23.035	8.6		2021/02/07	2045	MPC; JPL
P/2020 V4	Rankin (*JFC)	28.52	0.4484	9.3336	5.15	14.245	6.9		2021/07/18	2050	MPC; JPL
P/2021 C2	PanSTARRS (*JFC)	29.47	0.4874	9.5408	4.890	21.927	11.4		2021/02/24	2050	MPC; JPL
C/2021 J1	Maury–Attard	134.85	0.9338	26.296	1.74	92.710	13.4		2021/02/19	2155	MPC; JPL
P/2021 J3	ATLAS (*JFC)	26.69	0.4507	8.931	4.890	14.573	6.9		2019/07/03	2046	MPC; JPL
C/2021 K1	ATLAS (*JFC)	45.50	0.8040	12.745	2.498	16.276	6.2	7.59 km	2021/05/04	2066	MPC; JPL
P/2021 R1	PanSTARRS (*JFC)	24.64	0.4229	8.467	4.886	5.520	7.4		2021/12/16	2046	MPC; JPL
P/2021 TR_{81}	Lemmon (*JFC)	25.95	0.83246	8.765	1.469	36.821	15.6		2022/04/03	2047	MPC; JPL
P/2021 U1	Wierzchos	24.83	0.7127	8.511	2.445	30.560	16.1		2021/09/30	2046	MPC; JPL
P/2021 V2	Fuls (*JFC)	27.15	0.6130	9.034	3.500	12.696	7.0		2023/01/21	2050	MPC; JPL
C/2022 F2	NEOWISE	117.13	0.934	23.939	1.585	97.293	15.8		2022/03/23	2139	MPC; JPL
C/2022 P1	NEOWISE	79.30	0.9136	18.458	1.595	154.607	10.0	1.525 km	2022/11/28	2102	MPC; JPL
C/2022 Q2	ATLAS	187.51	0.9498	32.760	1.644	151.49	13.9		2023/01/31	2210	MPC; JPL
C/2022 S5	PanSTARRS	92.51	0.8935	20.454	2.179	136.53	12.8		2022/11/27	2115	MPC; JPL
P/2022 Y1	Hogan	44.43	0.764	12.545	2.958	18.859	13.3		2022/11/27	2067	MPC; JPL
C/2022 Y2	Lemmon	87.14	0.871	19.655	2.545	165.907	7.5		2023/03/22	2110	MPC; JPL
C/2023 E1	ATLAS	85.02	0.947	19.334	1.027	38.313	16.2		2023/07/01	2108	MPC; JPL
C/2023 H3	PanSTARRS	50.39	0.616	13.642	5.233	2.489	7.2		2024/02/19	2074	MPC; JPL
C/2023 RN3	ATLAS (*JFC)	32.32	0.490	10.147	5.172	10.358	7.4		2023/01/17	2055	MPC; JPL
C/2023 S3	Lemmon	152.38	0.971	28.529	0.83	140.498	16.7	1.07 km	2024/01/19	2164	MPC; JPL
C/2023 V3	PanSTARRS	48.17	0.662	13.239	4.472	40.259	11.6		2023/08/06	2071	MPC; JPL
C/2023 X4	Hogan (*JFC)	31.20	0.631	9.911	3.658	11.595	11.6		2024/05/24	2055	MPC; JPL
C/2024 A2	ATLAS	183.67	0.942	32.31	1.882	119.11	14.6		2024/04/28	2208	MPC; JPL
C/2024 C1	PanSTARRS (*JFC)	34.28	0.582	10.55	4.413	14.22	7.6		2024/08/30	2058	MPC; JPL
C/2024 C2	PanSTARRS (*CTC)	65.04	0.444	16.17	8.99	27.28	6.2		2025/03/11	2090	MPC; JPL
C/2024 C3	PanSTARRS (*JFC)	39.70	0.423	12.64	6.712	22.47	9.1		2023/11/08	2073	MPC; JPL
C/2024 F2	PanSTARRS (*JFC)	31.08	0.5996	9.885	3.958	13.74	11.2		2024/08/03	2055	MPC; JPL
C/2024 L1	PanSTARRS	38.77	0.533	11.454	5.348	99.17	10.0		2025/04/11	2064	MPC; JPL
C/2024 M1	ATLAS	162.89	0.943	29.83	1.703	73.71	14.2		2024/11/20	2187	MPC; JPL
C/2024 O2	PanSTARRS (*JFC)	20.08	0.499	7.388	3.698	28.97	12.5		2024/04/20	2044	MPC; JPL
C/2024 XK_{14}	Bok	70.137	0.87890	17.01	2.059	109.21	6.8		2025/05/20	2095	MPC; JPL
C/2025 K2	PanSTARRS	127.68	0.887	25.36	2.863	113.98	7.4		2025/10/25	2154	MPC; JPL
C/2025 W2	ATLAS	136.81	0.94527	26.55	1.453	94.706	15.0		2025/12/07	2162	MPC; JPL
C/2025 X1	PanSTARRS (*JFC)	195.99	0.86153	33.741	4.672	36.96	10.0		2026/12/10	2222	MPC; JPL
C/2026 J1	PanSTARRS	128.89	0.90108	25.517	2.524	73.119	13.8		2026/06/30	2155	MPC; JPL
P/2026 R2	Leonard	21.76	0.89870	7.794	0.789	78.099	18.9		2026/10/25	2048/05/30	MPC; JPL

== See also ==
- List of comets by type
  - List of numbered comets
  - List of periodic comets
  - List of long-period comets
  - List of near-parabolic comets
  - List of parabolic and hyperbolic comets
  - List of Kreutz sungrazers
  - List of comets with no meaningful orbit
