= NGC 352 =

Barred spiral galaxy in the constellation Cetus

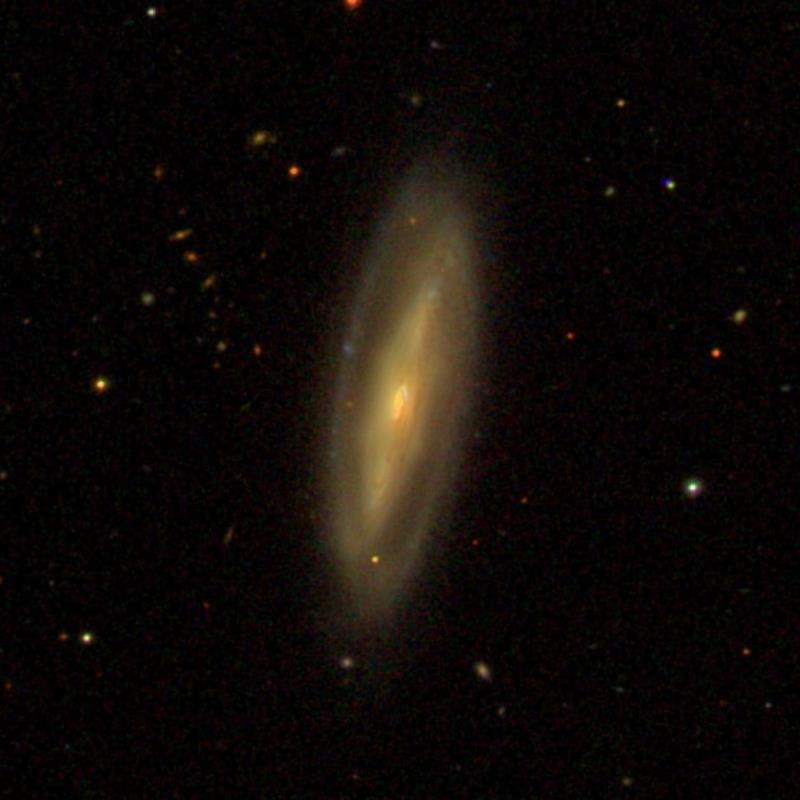
- SDSS image of NGC 352

Observation data (J2000 epoch)
- Constellation: Cetus
- Right ascension: 01^{h} 02^{m} 09.206^{s}
- Declination: −04° 14′ 43.61″
- Redshift: 0.017625
- Heliocentric radial velocity: 5284 km/s
- Distance: 208.09 ± 21.18 Mly (63.800 ± 6.495 Mpc)
- Apparent magnitude (V): 12.02
- Apparent magnitude (B): 12.5
- Absolute magnitude (V): −22.00

Characteristics
- Type: (R')SB(rs)b?
- Size: 152,000 ly (46,610 pc) (Note: RC3 D_{0} (blue) values used.)
- Apparent size (V): 2.4′ × 0.9′

Other designations
- MGC-01-03-071, PGC 3701

NGC 352 is a barred spiral galaxy in the constellation Cetus. It was discovered on September 20, 1784 by William Herschel. It was described as "pretty faint, small, irregularly extended" by John Louis Emil Dreyer, the compiler of the New General Catalogue; he also noted an "8th magnitude star 97 seconds of time to east" relative to the galaxy.

== Supernova ==
One supernova has been observed in NGC 352: SN 2022jzx (Type II, mag. 16.888) was discovered by ATLAS on 16 May 2022.
