= Comet Leonard (disambiguation) =

Comet Leonard may refer to any of the comets discovered by Gregory J. Leonard below:

== Periodic comets ==
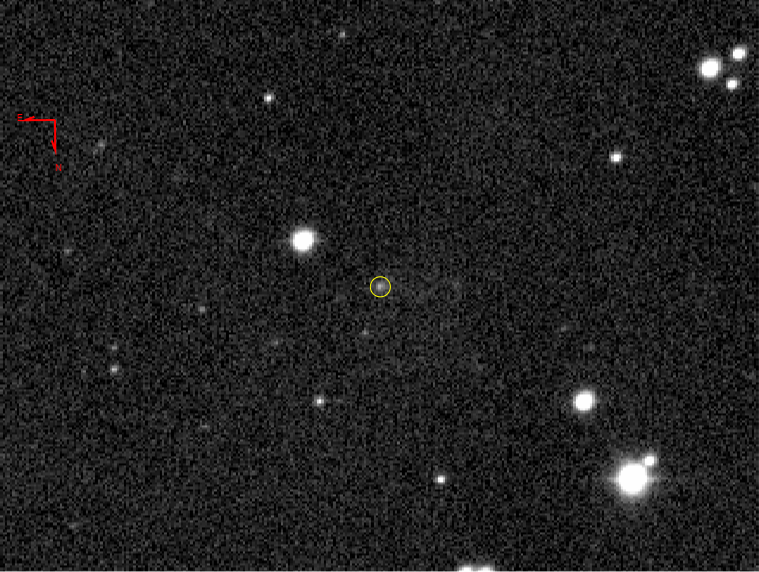
449P/Leonard

=== Jupiter-family comets ===
- 396P/Leonard
- 449P/Leonard
- 486P/Leonard
- P/2018 VN_{2} (Leonard)
- P/2021 L2 (Leonard)

=== Halley-type comets ===
- C/2017 W2 (Leonard)
- P/2017 Y3 (Leonard)
- P/2026 R2 (Leonard)

== Non-periodic comets ==
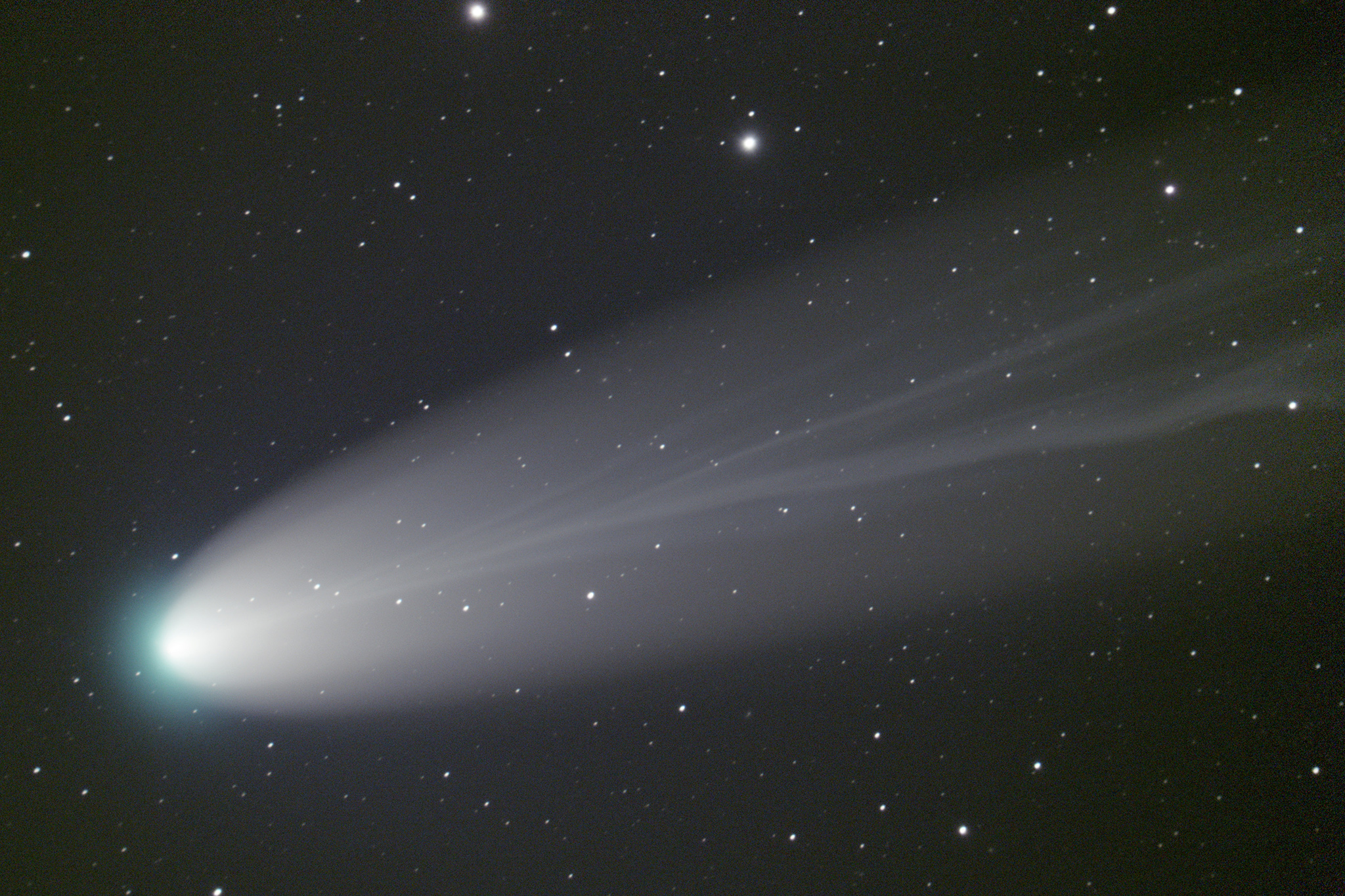
C/2021 A1 (Leonard)

=== Near-parabolic comets ===
- C/2020 H4 (Leonard)
- C/2020 K3 (Leonard)
- C/2020 X4 (Leonard)
- C/2021 G1 (Leonard)
- C/2021 U4 (Leonard)
- C/2022 U1 (Leonard)
- C/2022 W3 (Leonard)
- C/2023 A1 (Leonard)
- C/2023 X1 (Leonard)
- C/2024 G5 (Leonard)

=== Parabolic and hyperbolic comets ===
- C/2021 A1 (Leonard)
- C/2022 K1 (Leonard)
- C/2022 R3 (Leonard)
- C/2023 V5 (Leonard)
- C/2026 H2 (Leonard)
