= NGC 1132 =

Galaxy in the constellation Eridanus

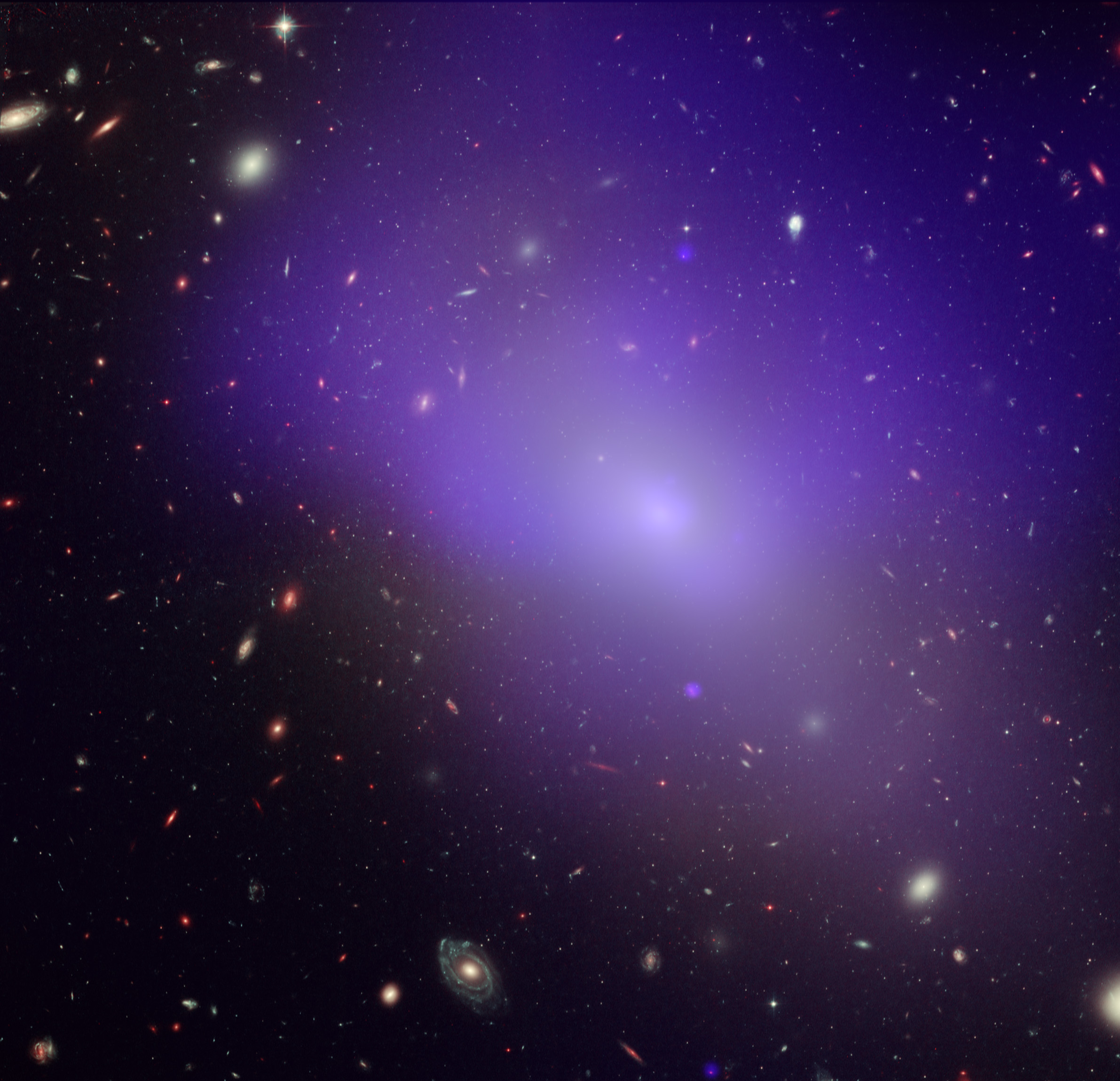
- A visible light image of NGS1132 with X-ray emission superimposed (rendered in blue)

Observation data (J2000 epoch)
- Constellation: Eridanus
- Right ascension: 02^{h} 52^{m} 51.82^{s}
- Declination: −01° 16′ 29.0″
- Redshift: 6871 km/s
- Heliocentric radial velocity: 0.023189
- Distance: 263.9 Mly (80.91 Mpc)
- Apparent magnitude (B): 13.9

Characteristics
- Type: E

Other designations
- UGC 2359, MCG +00-08-040, PGC 10891

NGC 1132 is an elliptical galaxy located in the constellation Eridanus. The galaxy was discovered by British astronomer John Herschel on November 23, 1827. It is located at a distance of about 318 million light-years away from Earth.

NGC 1132 and nearby small galaxies are known as a "fossil group" that resulted from the merger of a group of galaxies. It is the prototype example of the class of fossil galaxy groups. The identification as a fossil group was made in 1999. This group contains an enormous amount of dark matter and a large amount of hot gas that emits X-ray radiation. The galaxy is surrounded by thousands of globular star clusters.

== Supernova ==
One supernova has been observed in NGC 1132:

- SN 2024pbe (Type Ia, mag. 17.785) was discovered by ATLAS on 8 July 2024.

== Image gallery ==
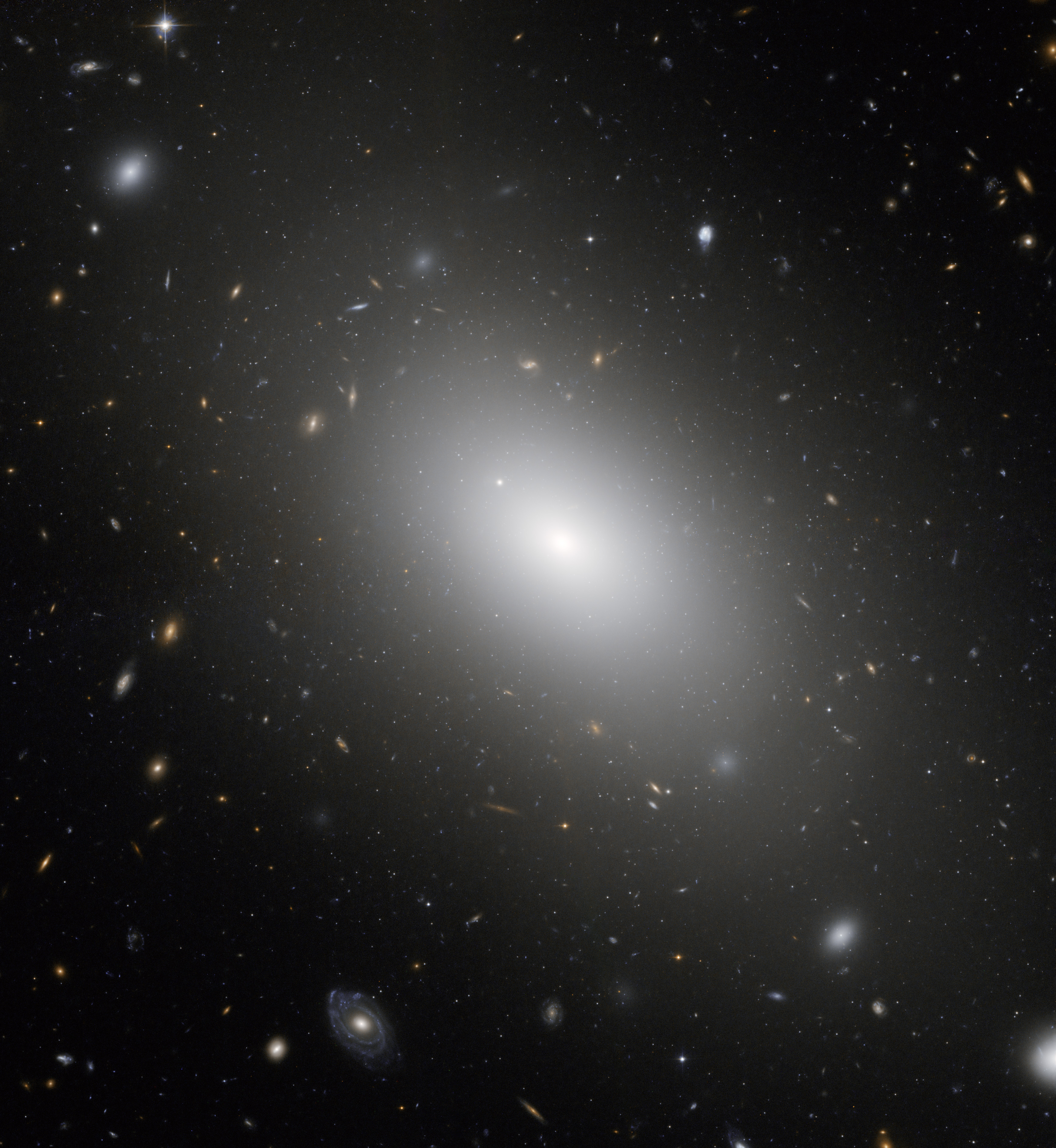
NGC 1132 imaged by the Hubble Space Telescope

== See also ==
Media related to NGC 1132 at Wikimedia Commons
