= NGC 234 =

Spiral galaxy in the constellation Pisces

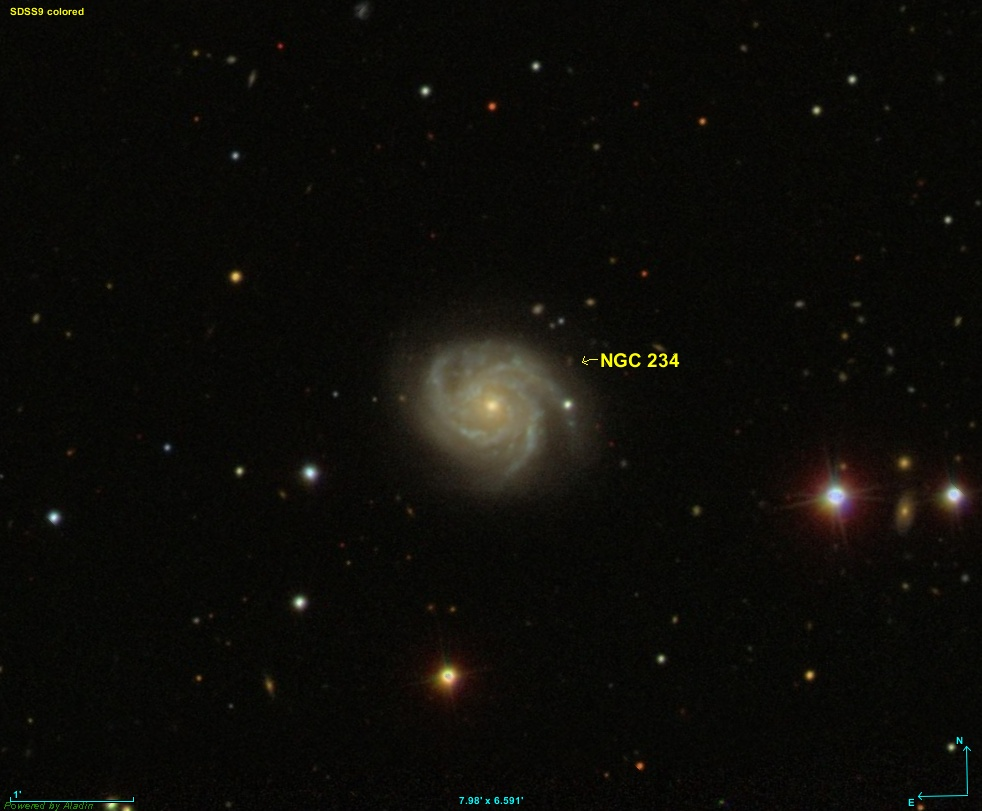
- NGC 234 imaged by SDSS

Observation data (J2000 epoch)
- Constellation: Pisces
- Right ascension: 00^{h} 43^{m} 32.4^{s}
- Declination: +14° 20′ 33″
- Redshift: 0.014877
- Apparent magnitude (V): 13.3g

Characteristics
- Type: SABc
- Apparent size (V): 1.40' × 1.25'

Other designations
- UGC 463, CGCG 434-032, CGCG 435-001, MCG +02-02-028, 2MASX J00433238+1420334, 2MASXi J0043323+142033, IRAS 00409+1404, F00409+1404, PGC 2600.

NGC 234 is a spiral galaxy located in the constellation Pisces. It was discovered on October 14, 1784, by William Herschel.

== Supernova ==
One supernova has been observed in NGC 234:

- SN 2021abze (Type II, mag. 16.632) was discovered by ATLAS on 22 October 2021.
