= C/2020 M3 (ATLAS) =

Halley-type comet

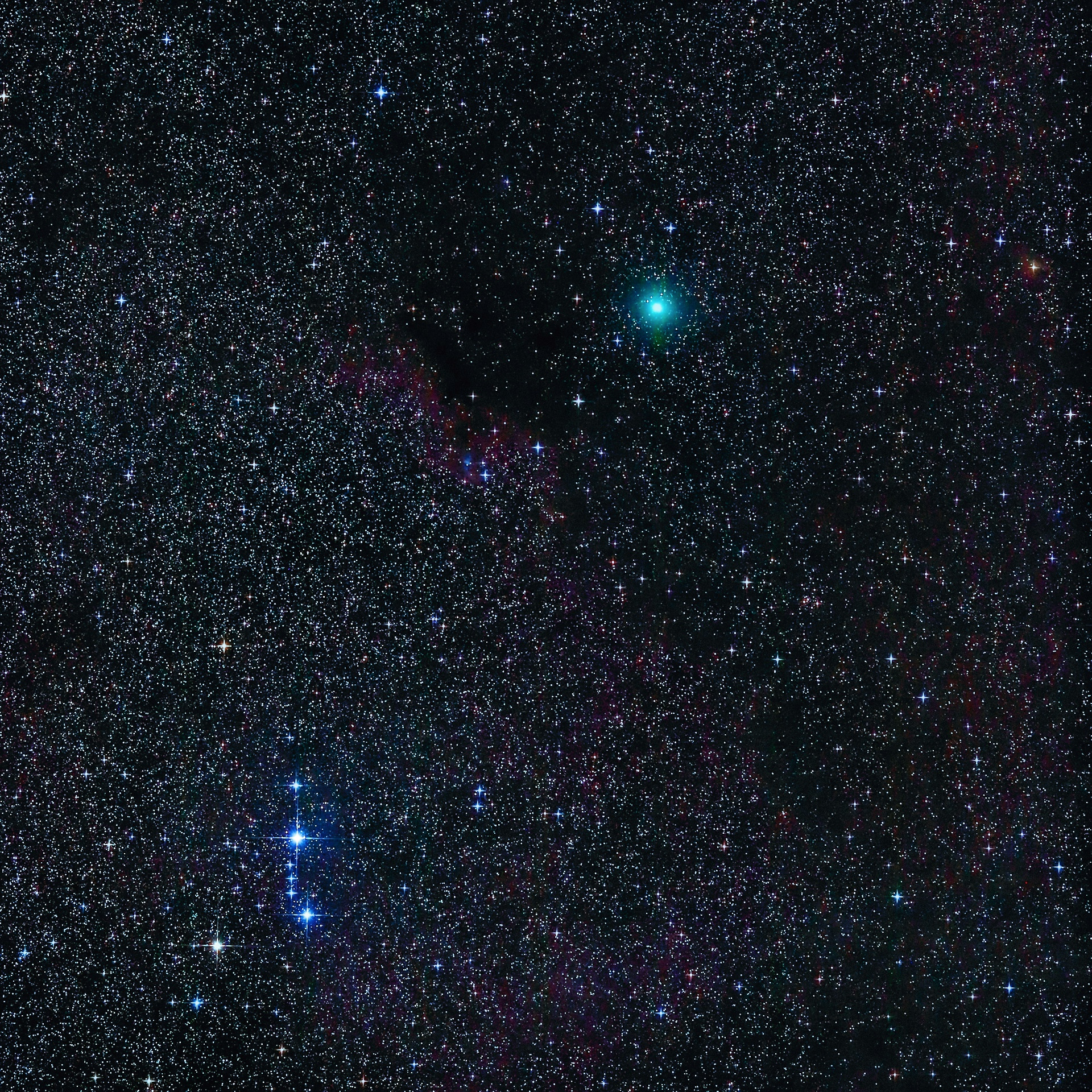
- Comet C/2020 M3 (ATLAS) photographed on 21 November 2020

Discovery
- Discovery site: ATLAS–MLO (T08)
- Discovery date: 27 June 2020

Designations
- Alternative designations: CK20M030

Orbital characteristics
- Epoch: 26 November 2020 (JD 2459179.5)
- Observation arc: 348 days
- Number of observations: 2,344
- Aphelion: 52.367 AU
- Perihelion: 1.268 AU
- Semi-major axis: 26.817 AU
- Eccentricity: 0.95371
- Orbital period: 138.87 years
- Inclination: 23.474°
- Longitude of ascending node: 71.250°
- Argument of periapsis: 328.45°
- Mean anomaly: 0.223°
- Last perihelion: 25 October 2020
- Next perihelion: ~2159
- T_{Jupiter}: 1.460
- Earth MOID: 0.327 AU
- Jupiter MOID: 0.886 AU

Physical characteristics
- Mean radius: 1.135 km (0.705 mi)
- Comet total magnitude (M1): 14.6
- Apparent magnitude: 6.9 (2020 apparition)

Comet C/2020 M3 (ATLAS) is a Halley-type comet that passed within 0.358 AU (53.6 million km) from Earth on 14 November 2020. It is one of many comets discovered by the Asteroid Terrestrial-impact Last Alert System (ATLAS).

== Observational history ==
The comet was first discovered on 27 June 2020 as an asteroid-like object by the 0.5 m (1.6 ft)-telescope at the Mauna Loa Observatory in Hawaii as part of the ATLAS survey. Observations in August 2020 revealed that the comet was about 4–5 magnitudes brighter than predicted.

By 8 November 2020, the comet was seen a few degrees east of the Horseshoe and Orion Nebulae. It passed closest to Earth at a distance of 0.358 AU (53.6 million km) on 14 November. By 25 November, the comet was passing through the constellation Taurus, near the Crab Nebula's position.

== Physical characteristics ==
Observations conducted by the TRAPPIST-North telescope at the Oukaïmeden Observatory in Morocco were used to determine the comet's dust production and chemical composition. It was determined that the comet had a typical composition compared to other comets, without any depletion of carbon-chain elements from its coma.
