= C/2023 RN3 (ATLAS) =

Halley-type comet

C/2023 RN_{3} (ATLAS)
Discovery
- Discovery site: ATLAS–HKO (T05)
- Discovery date: 4 September 2023

Orbital characteristics
- Epoch: 2 November 2023 (JD 2460250.5)
- Observation arc: 2.01 years (Note: Observation arc from the Minor Planet Center database covering dates from 26 August 2023 until 29 August 2025.)
- Earliest precovery date: 26 August 2023
- Number of observations: 639
- Aphelion: 15.128 AU
- Perihelion: 5.172 AU
- Semi-major axis: 10.149 AU
- Eccentricity: 0.49041
- Orbital period: 32.337 years
- Inclination: 10.358°
- Longitude of ascending node: 207.07°
- Argument of periapsis: 130.30°
- Mean anomaly: 8.778°
- Last perihelion: 18 January 2023
- Next perihelion: 2055
- T_{Jupiter}: 2.907
- Earth MOID: 4.175 AU
- Jupiter MOID: 0.627 AU

Physical characteristics
- Spectral type: (g′−r') = 0.61±0.03; (r′−i′) = 0.30±0.03; (i′−z′) = 0.04±0.08
- Comet total magnitude (M1): 6.5
- Apparent magnitude: 17.8 (2023 apparition)

C/2023 RN_{3} (ATLAS) is a Halley-type comet (Note: JPL-SBDB considers C/2023 RN_{3} as a Jupiter-family comet.) with a centaur-like orbit around the Sun lasting once every 32 years. It is one of many comets discovered by the Asteroid Terrestrial-impact Last Alert System (ATLAS).
