= P/2006 HR30 (Siding Spring) =

Halley-type comet

P/2006 HR_{30} (Siding Spring)
Discovery
- Discovery site: Siding Spring Observatory
- Discovery date: 20 April 2006

Designations
- MPC designation: P/2006 HR_{30} P/2026 M4
- Alternative designations: Siding Spring 3

Orbital characteristics
- Epoch: 26 November 2006 (JD 2454065.5)
- Observation arc: 40.36 years (Note: Observation arc from the Minor Planet Center database only covered dates from 6 July 2005 until 14 July 2026 (21.02 years). This figure included its entire arc up to 5 March 1986.)
- Earliest precovery date: 5 March 1986?
- Number of observations: 3,074
- Aphelion: 14.41 AU
- Perihelion: 1.226 AU
- Semi-major axis: 7.818 AU
- Eccentricity: 0.84312
- Orbital period: 21.86 years
- Inclination: 31.884°
- Longitude of ascending node: 309.95°
- Argument of periapsis: 117.41°
- Mean anomaly: 358.32°
- Last perihelion: 2 January 2007
- Next perihelion: 9 October 2028
- T_{Jupiter}: 1.785
- Earth MOID: 0.453 AU
- Jupiter MOID: 0.574 AU

Physical characteristics
- Mean radius: 8.0 km (5.0 mi)
- Synodic rotation period: 73.2 hours
- Geometric albedo: 0.035–0.045
- Spectral type: D-type: (B–V) = 0.172±0.016; (V–R) = 0.098±0.008; (V–I) = 0.316±0.015
- Absolute magnitude (H): 12.09
- Comet total magnitude (M1): 13.9

Comet Siding Spring 3, also known as P/2006 HR_{30} (Siding Spring), is a Halley-type comet with a 21.86-year orbit around the Sun. It is one of several comets discovered by the Siding Spring Survey (SSS).

== Observational history ==
P/2006 HR_{30} was first observed as an asteroid-like object on 20 April 2006. Later, cometary activity was observed by the European Southern Observatory by Stephen C. Lowry and Alan Fitzsimmons around July 2006, reclassifying it from asteroid to comet. Precovery observations were obtained up to 6 July 2005, though unconfirmed observations of the comet being seen as early as March 1986 were reported. Javier Licandro and other astronomers from the La Palma Observatory reportedly failed to detect the coma first seen by Lowry around the same time, suggesting that 2006 HR_{30} is either an extinct or dormant comet.

It was accidentally recovered by Robert Weryk as a stellar-like object on images taken by Pan-STARRS on 16 June 2026, two years ahead of its next perihelion in 2028.

== Physical characteristics ==
Infrared observations from the NEOWISE mission in 2018 revealed a nucleus about 16.0 km (9.9 mi) in diameter. However, data obtained from the Akari mission suggests a much larger nucleus at 23.9–27.1 km (14.9–16.8 mi) in diameter assuming a geometric albedo of 0.035–0.045, and a bare nucleus (i.e. without cometary activity) was observed. This makes it one of the largest cometary nuclei known. The comet appeared reddish in spectroscopic observations, comparable to those of D-type or X-type asteroids.
