= C/2019 L3 (ATLAS) =

Parabolic comet

Discovery
- Discovery site: ATLAS–HKO (T05)
- Discovery date: 10 June 2019

Orbital characteristics
- Epoch: 10 October 2021 (JD 2459497.5)
- Observation arc: 5.97 years
- Number of observations: 6,499
- Perihelion: 3.554 AU
- Eccentricity: 1.00141
- Inclination: 48.364°
- Longitude of ascending node: 290.79°
- Argument of periapsis: 171.61°
- Mean anomaly: –0.007°
- Last perihelion: 9 January 2022
- T_{Jupiter}: 1.553
- Earth MOID: 2.576 AU
- Jupiter MOID: 1.654 AU

Physical characteristics
- Mean radius: 7.9 km (4.9 mi)
- Spectral type: (B–V) = 0.75±0.06; (V–R) = 1.04±0.09; (R–I) = 0.21±0.05
- Comet total magnitude (M1): 5.5
- Apparent magnitude: 8.4 (2022 apparition)

Comet ATLAS, provisional designation C/2019 L3, is a distant non-periodic comet that reached perihelion at a distance of 3.55 AU (531 million km) in January 2022. It is one of many comets discovered by the Asteroid Terrestrial-impact Last Alert System (ATLAS).

== Physical characteristics ==
Narrowband observations conducted at the TRAPPIST-North survey in January 2022 revealed that C/2019 L3 appears to be a very dusty comet, with a high dust-to-gas ratio relative to other comets. Data analysis in 2024 concluded that activity within the comet may have begun while it was at least 13 AU (1.9 billion km) from the Sun, indicating the possibility that the comet could remain active until at least the second half of 2026.

The nucleus of the comet is estimated to have a minimum radius of around 7.9 km (4.9 mi).
