= C/2023 E1 (ATLAS) =

Halley-type comet

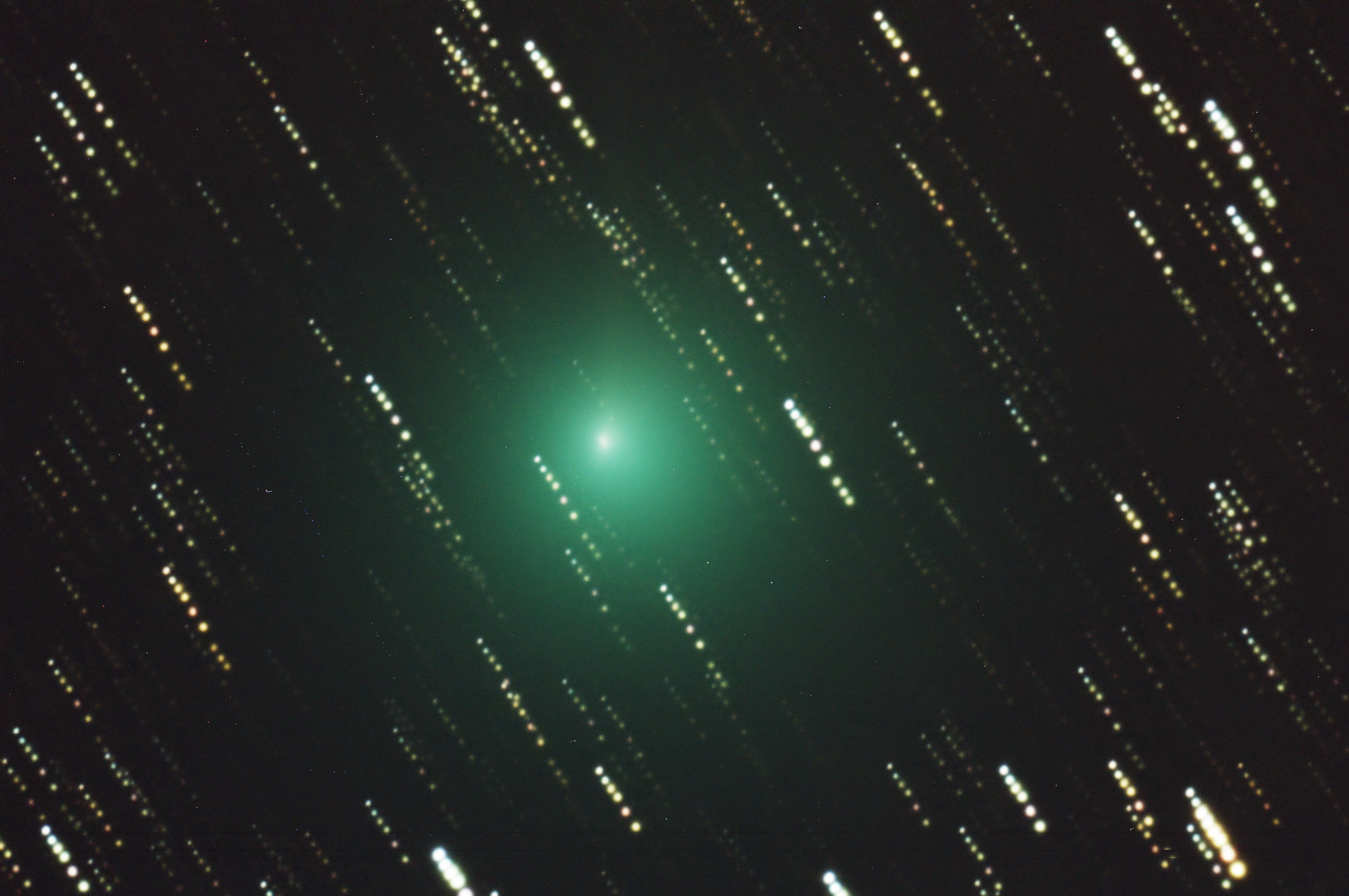
- The comet on 24 July 2023

Discovery
- Discovered by: ATLAS
- Discovery date: 1 March 2023

Orbital characteristics
- Epoch: 25 May 2023
- Observation arc: 214 days
- Earliest precovery date: 25 December 2022
- Aphelion: 37.660 AU
- Perihelion: 1.027 AU
- Semi-major axis: 19.343 AU
- Eccentricity: 0.947
- Orbital period: 85.07 years
- Inclination: 38.313°
- Longitude of ascending node: 164.57°
- Argument of periapsis: 105.89°
- Last perihelion: 1 July 2023
- Earth MOID: 0.365 AU
- Comet total magnitude (M1): 16.1
- Comet nuclear magnitude (M2): 18.3

C/2023 E1 (ATLAS) is a periodic comet with an orbital period of 85 years. It fits the classical definition of a Halley-type comet with an orbital period of between 20 and 200 years. The comet was discovered on 1 March 2023 by ATLAS South Africa. Upon discovery, the comet had an apparent magnitude of about 19 and had a very condensed coma. The comet was subsequently found in images obtained by other observatories back on 25 December 2022.

The comet brightened in late June to a magnitude of +10, and became visible in small telescopes and binoculars. At that time, it was located high in the northern skies, in the constellation of Ursa Minor. It passed its perihelion on 1 July and reached an apparent magnitude between 8 and 9. The comet had a greenish coma and a faint narrow ion tail. On 8 July it passed 9 degrees from the north celestial pole. The closest approach to Earth was on 18 August, at a distance of 0.375 AU.

The comet seems to be in a 2:1 orbital resonance with Neptune, with the comet completing two orbits for every orbit Neptune does.
