= P/2026 R2 (Leonard) =

Halley-type comet

Discovery
- Discovered by: Gregory J. Leonard
- Discovery site: Catalina Sky Survey (0.68-m Schmidt telescope)
- Discovery date: 14 September 2026

Designations
- Alternative designations: C46K1R1

Orbital characteristics
- Epoch: 24 September 2026 (JD 2461307.5)
- Observation arc: 71 days (Note: Observation arc from the Minor Planet Center database covering dates from 1 September 2026 until 11 November 2026.)
- Earliest precovery date: 1 September 2026
- Number of observations: 959
- Aphelion: 14.809 AU
- Perihelion: 0.789 AU
- Semi-major axis: 7.799 AU
- Eccentricity: 0.89877
- Orbital period: 21.783 years
- Inclination: 78.101°
- Longitude of ascending node: 179.23°
- Argument of periapsis: 205.53°
- Mean anomaly: 358.59°
- Last perihelion: 25 October 2026
- Next perihelion: ~15 May 2048
- T_{Jupiter}: 0.888
- Earth MOID: 0.172 AU
- Jupiter MOID: 1.038 AU

Physical characteristics
- Comet total magnitude (M1): 18.9
- Apparent magnitude: 11.9 (2026 apparition)

P/2026 R2 (Leonard) is a Halley-type comet with a 21.8-year orbit around the Sun. It passed perihelion on 25 October 2026 at a distance of 0.79 AU (118 million km; 73 million mi). It was initially left undesignated as a "new Catalina comet" until 7 October 2026.

== Observational history ==
The comet was found on 14 September 2026 by Greg Leonard in CCD images taken using a 0.68 m (27 in) Schmidt telescope of the Catalina Sky Survey in Arizona. Precovery observations from the Asteroid Terrestrial-impact Last Alert System (ATLAS) as early as 1 September 2026 were found by Sam Deen, however the imagery from the survey barely showed any cometary activity until at least 12 September 2026. At the time, the comet was a dim 18.2 magnitude object (G-band) which displayed a small, 10" wide coma and no tail.

On 2 October, the comet was reported to have a magnitude of 11.9, a 4 arcminutes wide coma and a 2 arcminutes long tail towards PA 73°. On 6 October 2026, it passed 0.316 AU (47.3 million km; 29.4 million mi) from Earth. By 13 October 2026, it had a declination of –30 significantly favoring viewing from the Southern hemisphere.
