= C/2019 Y4 (ATLAS) =

Non-periodic comet

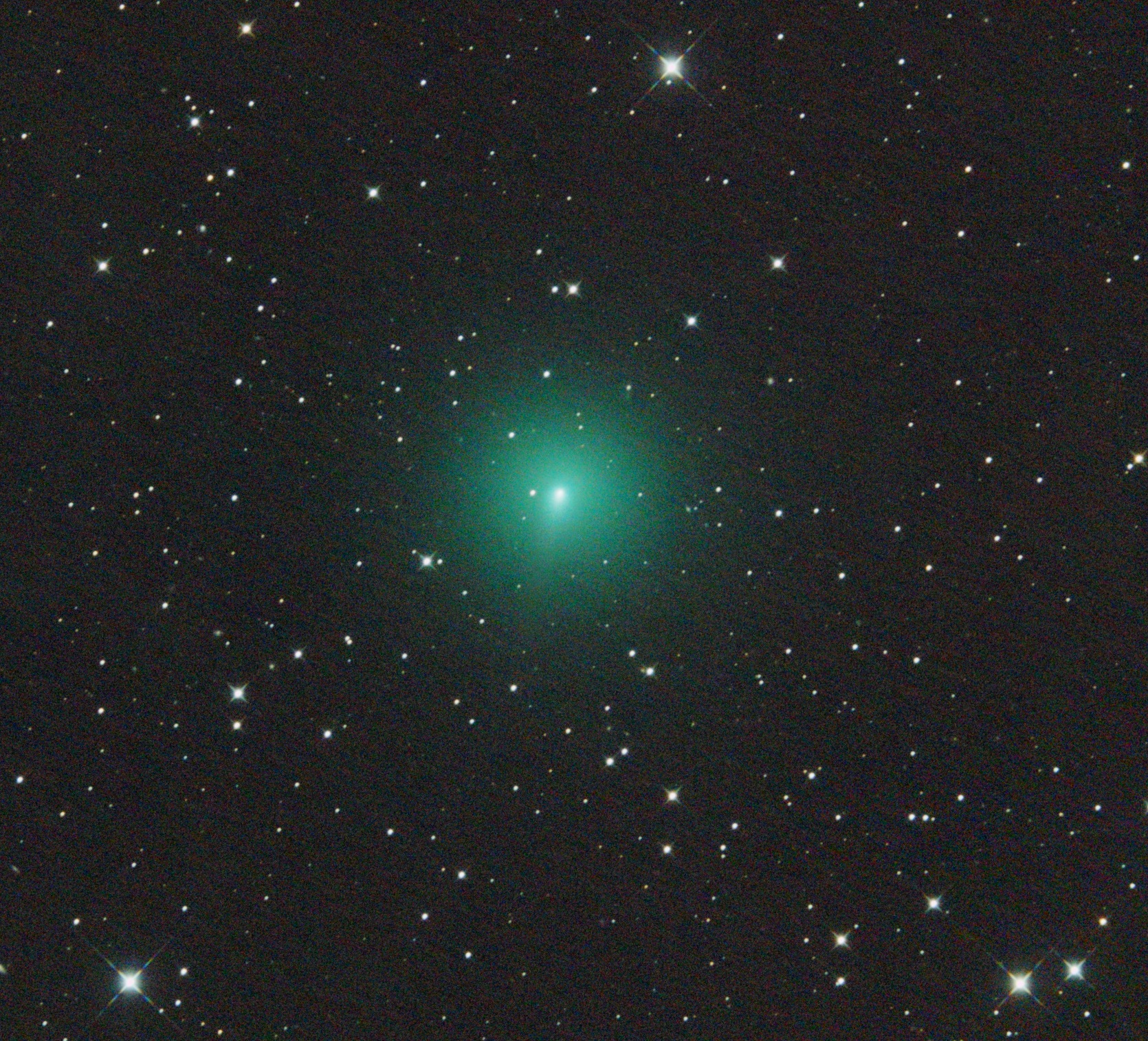
- C/2019 Y4 (ATLAS) imaged on March 14, 2020

Discovery
- Discovery site: ATLAS–MLO
- Discovery date: December 28, 2019

Designations
- MPC designation: C/2019 Y4-A; C/2019 Y4-B; C/2019 Y4-C; C/2019 Y4-D; C/2019 Y4-E
- Alternative designations: A10j7UG

Orbital characteristics
- Epoch: March 7, 2020 (JD 2458915.5)
- Observation arc: 115 days
- Number of observations: 1,250
- Aphelion: ~660 AU
- Perihelion: 0.2528 AU
- Semi-major axis: ~330 AU
- Eccentricity: 0.99924
- Orbital period: ~4,800 years (inbound); ~5,200 years (outbound)
- Inclination: 45.384°
- Longitude of ascending node: 120.57°
- Argument of periapsis: 177.41°
- Last perihelion: 31 May 2020
- T_{Jupiter}: 0.454
- Earth MOID: 0.631 AU
- Jupiter MOID: 1.394 AU

Physical characteristics
- Dimensions: 0.4–1.0 km (0.25–0.62 mi)
- Mean diameter: 0.6 km (0.37 mi)
- Comet total magnitude (M1): 9.9±0.9
- Comet nuclear magnitude (M2): 13.1±0.7
- Apparent magnitude: 7.0 (2021 apparition)

C/2019 Y4 (ATLAS) was a comet with a near-parabolic orbit discovered by the ATLAS survey on December 28, 2019. Early predictions based on the brightening rate suggested that the comet could become as bright as magnitude 0 matching the brightness of Vega. It received widespread media coverage due to its dramatic increase in brightness and orbit similar to the Great Comet of 1844, but on 22 March 2020, the comet started disintegrating. Such fragmentation events are very common for Kreutz Sungrazers. The comet continues to fade and did not reach naked eye visibility. By mid-May, comet ATLAS appeared very diffuse even in a telescope. C/2019 Y4 (ATLAS) has not been seen since 21 May 2020.

C/2019 Y4 (ATLAS) was the brightest on March 30 when it had an apparent magnitude of about 7, but after disintegrating, it continued to fade, until it was last observed on May 21. It is located in the constellation Monoceros but is no longer visible. It reached its nearest point to Earth on May 23 and come to perihelion (closest to the Sun) on May 31.

In April 2020, astronomers reported, on The Astronomer's Telegram, the possible disintegration of Comet ATLAS. The comet has fragmented into at least 4 pieces. NASA subsequently reported that the Hubble Space Telescope has identified that there could be as many as roughly "30 fragments on April 20, and 25 pieces on April 23." The fragmentation may be the result of outgassing causing an increase in the centrifugal force of the comet. Subsequent observations from the Lowell Observatory between July and September 2020 failed to see any remnants of the comet, indicating that it either had completely disintegrated or the surviving fragments, estimated to be no larger than 0.25 km (0.16 mi) in radius, simply went inactive.

The Solar Orbiter flew through the ion tail of comet ATLAS between May 31 and June 1 and the dust tail on June 6.

== Discovery ==
Comet ATLAS was discovered on CCD images taken on December 28, 2019, with a 0.5 m (20 in) reflecting telescope atop Mauna Loa in Hawaii. The images were taken as part of the Asteroid Terrestrial-impact Last Alert System (ATLAS). At the time of its discovery, the comet shone at magnitude 19.6 in the constellation Ursa Major as viewed from Earth. Larry Denneau was the first to identify the object's cometary appearance, placing the object on the Minor Planet Center's Possible Comet Confirmation Page, alerting other astronomers. Further observations over subsequent days identified a coma; a comet tail became increasingly apparent as observations continued.

== Initial observation and brightness ==
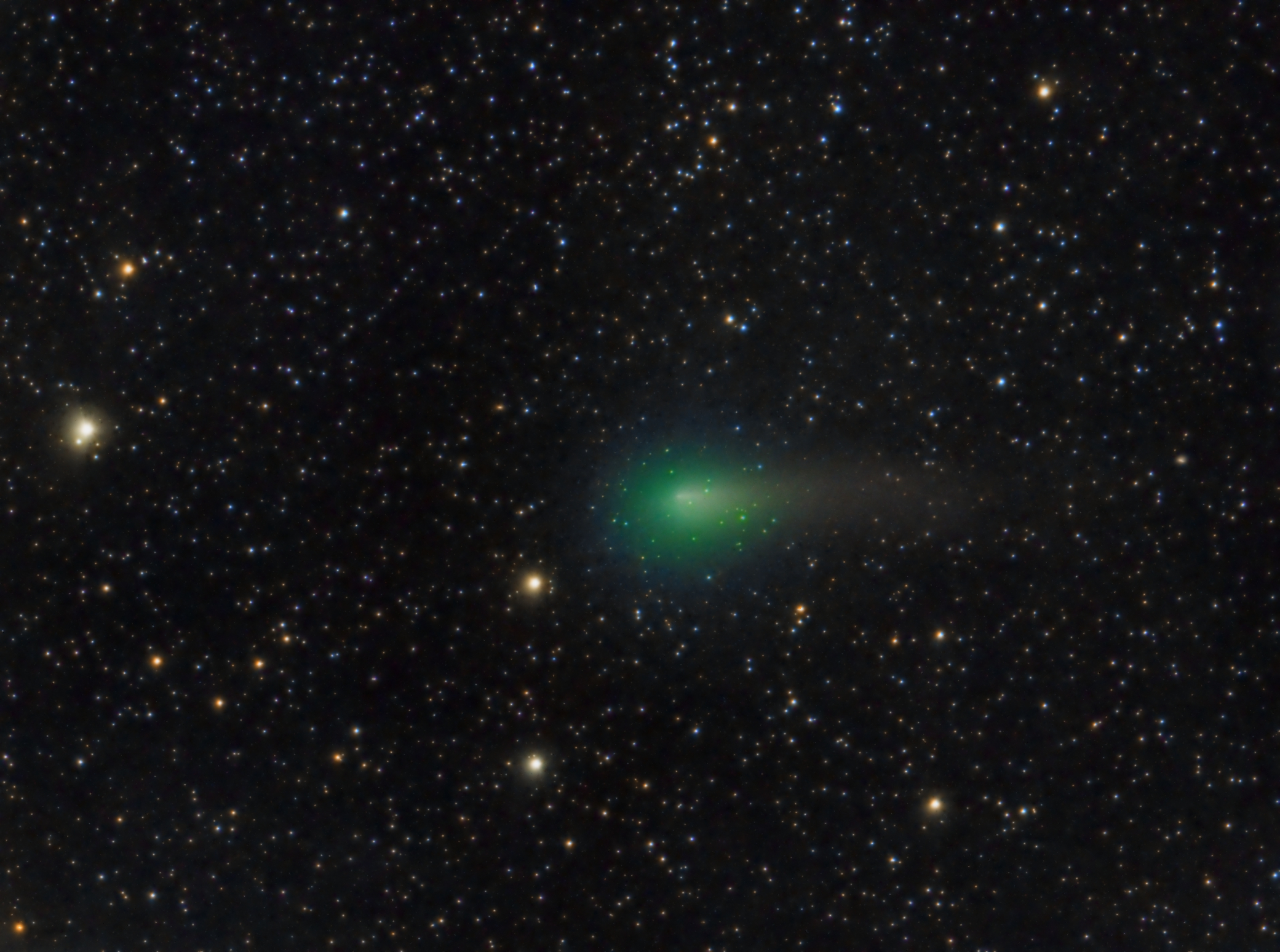
Comet ATLAS – reduced coma (April 15, 2020)

Between the beginning of February and near the end of March, Comet ATLAS brightened from magnitude 17 to magnitude 8, representing a 4000-fold increase in brightness. In March 2020, the comet's brightness increased four magnitudes. C/2019 Y4's green or aqua colour arose from emissions of diatomic carbon with a 1.2° or 10' or 3.3 million km multicolour tail, more than twice as wide as the Sun. As a diffuse object, the comet would need to reach an apparent magnitude of around 3–4 to be obvious to the casual observer in a dark sky. A 4th magnitude comet in bright twilight is not very impressive nor obvious. In early April, the comet faded due to a significant fragmentation event. On April 14, 2020, initial estimates of water production by the comet were reported, and found "a water production rate of 1.25×10^{28} +/− 5×10^{25} mol/sec within an aperture of 100,000 km".

== Orbit ==
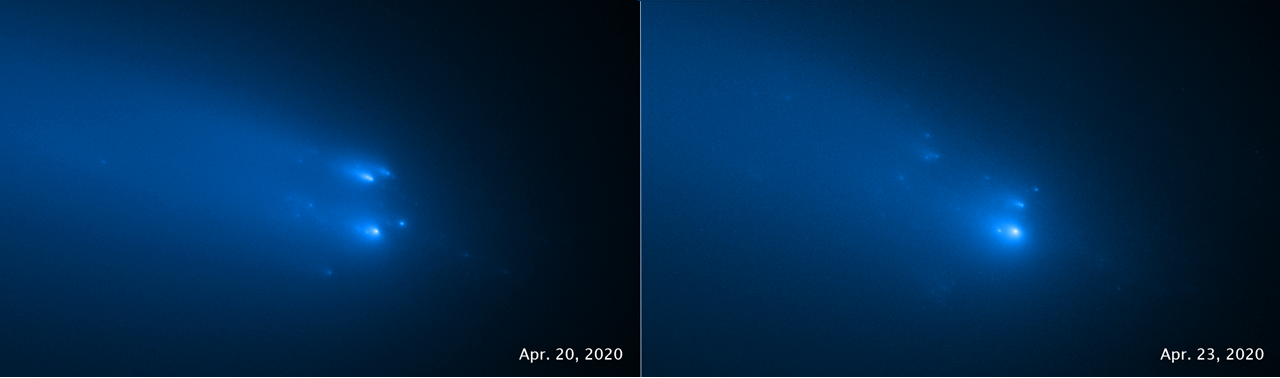
Fragments of Comet ATLAS as observed by the Hubble Space Telescope in late April 2020

At the time of its discovery Comet ATLAS was nearly 3 astronomical units (AU) from the Sun. The first orbital calculations for the comet were published on the Minor Planet Electronic Circular, and were based on observations taken between December 28, 2019, and January 9, 2020, which indicating a 4,400-year orbital period and a perihelion of 0.25 AU (37 million km). Similarities were noted between the orbital elements of C/2019 Y4 and the Great Comet of 1844 (C/1844 Y1), suggesting that C/2019 Y4 is a fragment of the same parent body, split about five thousands years ago.

The JPL Small-Body Database using an epoch of February 18, 2020, shows C/2019 Y4 (ATLAS) with an orbital period of approximately 6,000 years, but this solution includes misleading perturbations while inside of the planetary region. A more useful barycentric solution before the comet entered the planetary region shows an inbound orbital period of about 4,800 years. The comet reached its nearest point to the Sun on May 31, 2020. After leaving the planetary region, the comet will have an outbound orbital period of about 5,200 years.

The fragmentation of C/2019 Y4 in late March 2020, has changed the velocities of the fragments by up to 10 meters/second (25000 km/month). This small change in velocity can cause a big change in the long-term orbital period of these near-parabolic fragments. The short observation arc of ~10 days for fragments D&E results in large uncertainties in the orbital periods. Fragment B was observed the longest. Fragment D may have come the closest to Earth but due to the short observation arc has an uncertainty of ±2 million km in the close approach distance.

Orbital period of fragments
Fragment	Orbital period (years)	Closest Approach to Earth	obs arc (days)
C/2019 Y4-A	ejection	0.7858 AU (117.55 million km)	27
C/2019 Y4-B	17200±2300	0.7816 AU (116.93 million km)	40
C/2019 Y4-C	ejection	0.7824 AU (117.05 million km)	26
C/2019 Y4-D	126±86	0.7777 AU (116.34 million km)	8
C/2019 Y4-E	88±32	0.7794 AU (116.60 million km)	6

== Location ==
During January to March 2020, the comet was located in the constellation of Ursa Major. Throughout the month of April, the comet was in the constellation of Camelopardalis. On May 12 it moved into Perseus. It was 0.78 AU (117 million km; 300 LD) from Earth on May 23 during a new moon when the comet was 17 degrees from the Sun. At its perihelion on May 31, it was in Taurus 12 degrees from the Sun. Then, through June and July, it passed through Orion and Monoceros.

C/2019 Y4 (ATLAS)

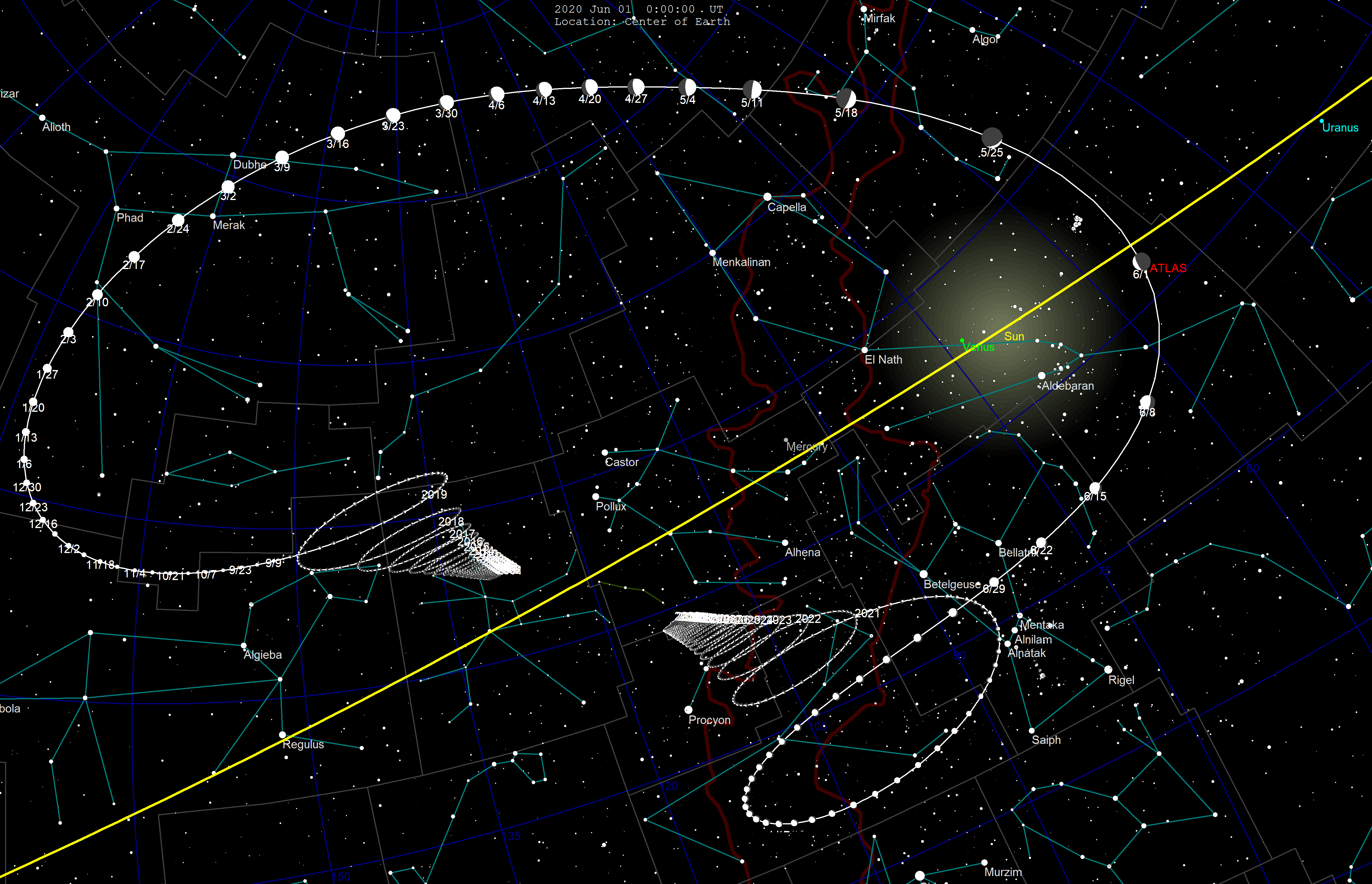
Comet ATLAS's trajectory in the sky with 7-day markers. The retrograde loops are caused by parallax from Earth's annual motion around the Sun. The most movement occurs when the comet is closest to Earth.

Animation of C/2019 Y4 (ATLAS) imaged over 10 minutes on March 28, 2020

C/2019 Y4 (ATLAS) as imaged on April 8, 2020. Note its faded appearance resulting from its disintegration.

== Gallery ==
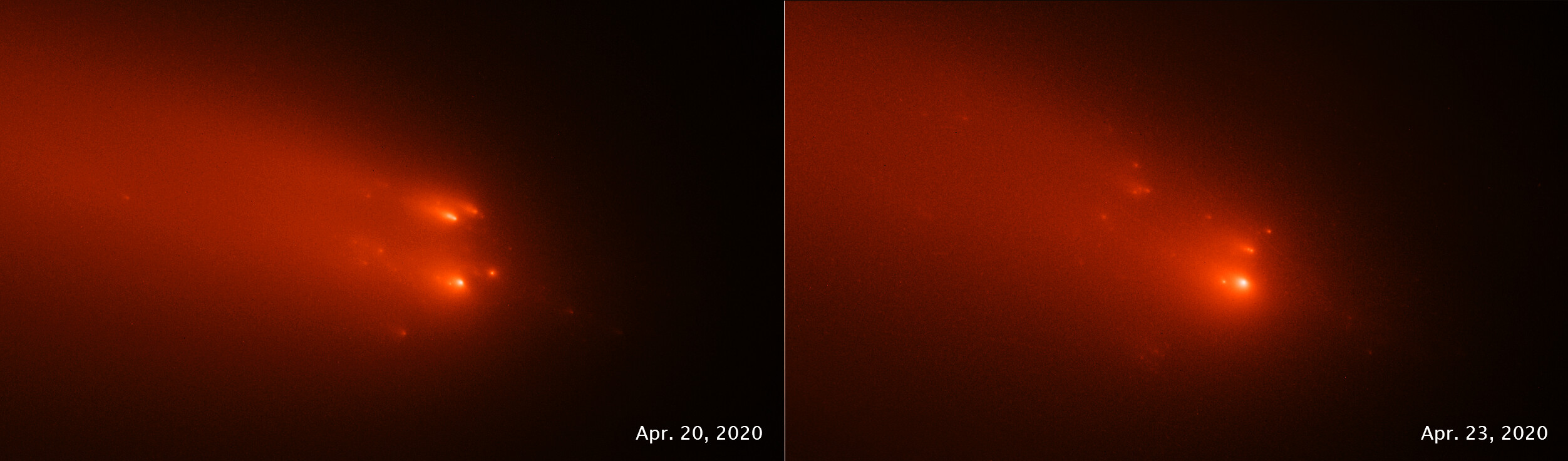
This pair of NASA/ESA Hubble Space Telescope images of comet C/2019 Y4 (ATLAS), taken on April 20 and April 23, 2020, reveal the breakup of the solid nucleus of the comet.
