= Asteroid Terrestrial-impact Last Alert System =

Robotic astronomical survey and early warning system

- Alternative names: ATLAS Project
- Observatory code: T05 (ATLAS-HKO); T08 (ATLAS-MLO); W68 (ATLAS-CHL); M22 (ATLAS-SAAO); R17 (ATLAS-TDO)
- Website: fallingstar.com

The Asteroid Terrestrial-impact Last Alert System (ATLAS) is a robotic astronomical survey and early warning system optimized for detecting smaller near-Earth objects a few weeks to days before they impact Earth.

Funded by NASA, and developed and operated by the University of Hawaii's Institute for Astronomy, the system currently has five 0.5-meter telescopes. Two are located 160 km apart in the Hawaiian islands, at Haleakala (ATLAS–HKO, observatory code T05) and Mauna Loa (ATLAS–MLO, observatory code T08) observatories, one is located at the Sutherland Observatory (ATLAS–SAAO, observatory code M22) in South Africa, one is at the El Sauce Observatory in Rio Hurtado (Chile) (ATLAS–CHL, observatory code W68). The newest at Teide Observatory in Spain (ATLAS-TDO, observatory code R17) was commissioned in February 2025, but as of May 2025 does not show results on the ATLAS web page.

ATLAS began observations in 2015 with one telescope at Haleakala, and a two-Hawaii-telescopes version became operational in 2017. The project then obtained NASA funding for two additional telescopes in the Southern Hemisphere, which became operational in early 2022. Each telescope surveys one quarter of the whole observable sky four times per clear night, and the addition of the two southern telescopes improved ATLAS's four-fold coverage of the observable sky from every two clear nights to nightly, as well as filled its previous blind spot in the far southern sky.

== Context ==
Major astronomical impact events have significantly shaped Earth's history, having been implicated in the formation of the Earth–Moon system, the origin of water on Earth, the evolutionary history of life, and several mass extinctions. Notable prehistorical impact events include the Chicxulub impact by a 10 kilometer asteroid 66 million years ago, believed to be the cause of the Cretaceous–Paleogene extinction event which eliminated all non-avian dinosaurs and three-quarters of the plant and animal species on Earth. The 37 million years old asteroid impact that excavated the Mistastin crater generated temperatures exceeding 2,370 °C, the highest known to have naturally occurred on the surface of the Earth.

Throughout recorded history, hundreds of Earth impacts (and meteor air bursts) have been reported, with some very small fraction causing deaths, injuries, property damage, or other significant localised consequences. Stony asteroids with a diameter of 4 meters (13 ft) enter Earth's atmosphere approximately once per year. Asteroids with a diameter of 7 meters enter the atmosphere about every 5 years, with as much kinetic energy as the atomic bomb dropped on Hiroshima (approximately 16 kilotons of TNT). Their air burst dissipates about one third of that kinetic energy, or 5 kilotons. These relatively small asteroids ordinarily explode in the upper atmosphere and most or all of their solids are vaporized. Asteroids with a diameter of 20 m (66 ft) strike Earth approximately twice every century. One of the best-known impacts in historical times is the 50-meter 1908 Tunguska event, which most likely caused no injuries but which leveled several thousand square kilometers of forest in a very sparsely populated part of Siberia, Russia. A similar impact over a more populous region would have caused locally catastrophic damage. The 2013 Chelyabinsk meteor event is the only known impact in historical times to have resulted in a large number of injuries, with the potential exception of the possibly highly deadly but poorly documented 1490 Qingyang event in China. The approximately 20-meter Chelyabinsk meteor is the largest recorded object to have impacted a continent of the Earth since the Tunguska event.

Future impacts are bound to occur, with much higher odds for smaller regionally damaging asteroids than for larger globally damaging ones. The 2018 final book of physicist Stephen Hawking, Brief Answers to the Big Questions, considers a large asteroid collision the biggest threat to our planet. In April 2018, the B612 Foundation reported "It's a 100 per cent certainty we'll be hit [by a devastating asteroid], but we're not 100 per cent sure when." In June 2018, the US National Science and Technology Council warned that America is unprepared for an asteroid impact event, and has developed and released the "National Near-Earth Object Preparedness Strategy Action Plan" to better prepare.

Large NEAs (at least 1 km in diameter) discovered each year
- LINEAR
- NEAT
- Spacewatch
- LONEOS
- CSS
- Pan-STARRS
- NEOWISE
- ATLAS
- Other-US
- Others

Larger asteroids are bright enough to be detected while far from the Earth, and their orbits can therefore be very precisely determined many years in advance of any close approach. Thanks largely to Spaceguard cataloging initiated by a 2005 mandate of the United States Congress to NASA, the inventory of the approximately one thousand Near Earth Objects with diameters above 1 kilometer was for instance 97% complete in 2017. The slowly improving completeness for 140 meter objects is estimated to be around 40%, and the planned NEO Surveyor NASA mission is expected to identify almost all of them by 2040. Any impact by one of these known asteroids would be predicted decades to centuries in advance, long enough to consider deflecting them away from Earth. None of them will impact Earth for at least the next century, and we are therefore largely safe from globally civilisation-ending kilometer-size impacts for at least the mid-term future. Regionally catastrophic impacts by asteroids a few hundred meters across, if any is to occur, cannot be excluded at this point in time, but should become predictable by 2040 thanks to NEO Surveyor.

Sub-140m impacting asteroids would not cause large scale damage but are still locally catastrophic. They are much more common and they can, by contrast to larger ones, only be detected when they come very close to the Earth. In most cases this only happens during their final approach. Those impacts therefore will always need a constant watch and they typically cannot be identified earlier than a few weeks in advance, far too late for interception. According to expert testimony in the United States Congress in 2013, NASA would at that time have required at least five years of preparation before a mission to intercept an asteroid could be launched. This preparation time could be much reduced by pre-planning a ready to launch mission, but the post-launch years needed to first meet the asteroid and then to slowly deflect it by at least the diameter of the Earth would be extremely hard to compress.

== Naming ==
The Last Alert part of the ATLAS name acknowledges that the system will find smaller asteroids years too late for potential deflection but would provide the days or weeks of warning needed to evacuate and otherwise prepare a target area. According to ATLAS project lead John Tonry, "that's enough time to evacuate the area of people, take measures to protect buildings and other infrastructure, and be alert to a tsunami danger generated by ocean impacts". Most of the more than 1 billion rubles (approximately $33M USD at the time) damage and of the 1500 injuries caused by the 17-m Chelyabinsk meteor impact in 2013 were from window glass broken by its shock wave. With even a few hours advance warning, those losses and injuries could have been much reduced by actions as simple as propping all windows open before the impact and staying away from them.

== Overview ==
The ATLAS project was developed at the University of Hawaii with US$5 million initial funding from NASA, and its first element was deployed on Haleakala in 2015. This first telescope became fully operational at the end of 2015, and the second one on Mauna Loa in March 2017. Replacement of the initially substandard Schmidt corrector plates of both telescopes in June 2017 brought their image quality closer to its nominal 2 pixels (3.8") width and consequently improved their sensitivity by one magnitude. In August 2018, the project obtained US$3.8 million of additional NASA funding to install two telescopes in the Southern Hemisphere. One is hosted by the South African Astronomical Observatory and the other at the El Sauce Observatory in Chile. Both started operating in early 2022. This geographical expansion of ATLAS provides visibility of the far Southern sky, more continuous coverage, better resilience to bad weather, and additional information on the asteroid orbit from the parallax effect. The full ATLAS concept consists of eight telescopes, spread over the globe for 24h/24h coverage of the full night sky.

As long as their radiant is not too close to the Sun, the automated system provides a one-week warning for a 45 metres (150 ft) diameter asteroid, and a three-week warning for a 120 m (390 ft) one. By comparison, the February 2013 Chelyabinsk meteor impact was from an object estimated at 17 m (60 ft) diameter. Its arrival direction happened to be close to the Sun and it therefore was in the blind spot of any Earth-based visible light warning system. A similar object arriving from a dark direction would be detected by ATLAS a few days in advance.

As a by-product of its main design goal, ATLAS can identify any moderately bright variable or moving object in the night sky. It therefore also looks for variable stars, supernovae, dwarf planets, comets, and non-impacting asteroids.

== Design and operation ==
The full ATLAS concept consists of eight 50-centimeter diameter f/2 Wright-Schmidt telescopes, spread over the globe for full-night-sky and 24h/24h coverage, and each fitted with a 110 Megapixel CCD array camera. The system consists of four such telescopes: ATLAS1 and ATLAS2 operate 160 km apart on the Haleakala and Mauna Loa volcanoes in the Hawaiian Islands, ATLAS3 is at the South African Astronomical Observatory and ATLAS4 is in Chile. These telescopes are notable for their large 7.4° field of view — about 15 times the diameter of the full moon — of which their 10 500 × 10 500 CCD camera images the central 5.4° × 5.4°. This system can image the whole night sky visible from a single location with about 1000 separate telescope pointings. At 30 seconds per exposure plus 10 seconds for simultaneously reading out the camera and repointing the telescope, each ATLAS unit can therefore scan the whole visible sky a little over once each night, with a median completeness limit at apparent magnitude 19.

Since the mission of ATLAS is to identify moving objects, each telescope actually observes one quarter of the sky four times in a night at approximately 15-minute intervals. In perfect conditions, the four telescopes together can therefore observe the full night sky four times every night, but bad weather at one or the other site, occasional technical problems, and even the odd volcanic eruption of Mauna Loa, all reduce the effective coverage rate. The four nightly exposures by a telescope allow to automatically link multiple observations of an asteroid into a very preliminary orbit, with some robustness to the loss of one observation to overlap between the asteroid and a bright star. Astronomers can then predict the asteroid's approximate position on subsequent nights for follow-up.

Apparent magnitude 19 is classified as "respectably but not extremely faint", and is approximately 100 000 times too faint to be seen with a naked eye from a very dark location. It is equivalent to the light of a match flame in New York viewed from San Francisco. ATLAS therefore scans the visible sky in much less depth, but much more quickly, than larger surveying telescope arrays such as University of Hawaii's Pan-STARRS. Pan-STARRS goes approximately 100 times deeper, but needs weeks instead of a quarter of a night to scan the whole sky just once. This makes ATLAS better suited to finding small asteroids which can only be seen during the just few days that they brighten dramatically when they happen to pass very close to the Earth.

NASA's Near-Earth Observation Program initially provided a US$5 million grant, with $3.5 million covering the first three years of design, construction and software development, and the balance of the grant to fund the systems operation for two years following its entry into full operational service in late 2015. Further NASA grants funded continued operation of ATLAS and the construction of the two Southern telescopes.

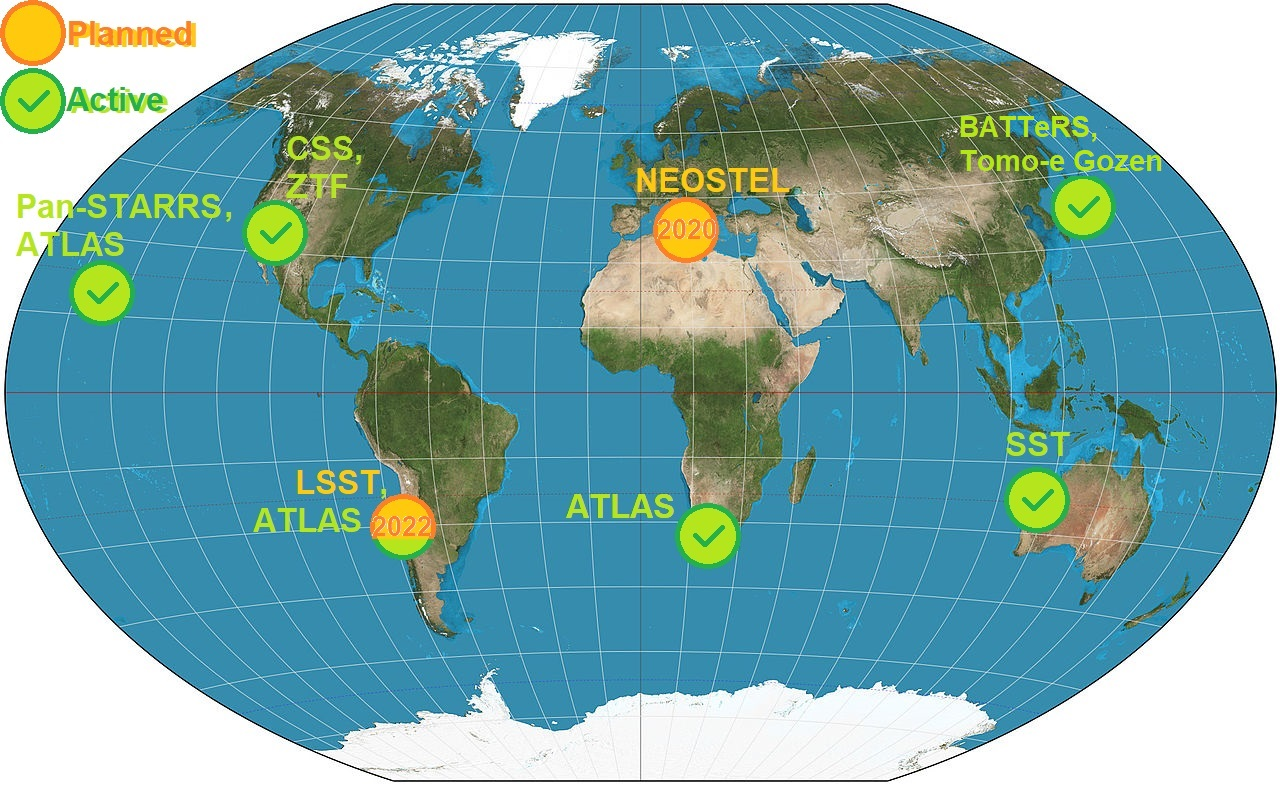
Now complete, the Chile and South Africa ATLAS sites have filled in the previous lack of coverage in the Southern Hemisphere (see Asteroid impact prediction). Sited around 120° (8 hours) east of existing surveys, the ATLAS South Africa telescope (and the planned NEOSTEL in Sicily) also provide warnings during the Hawaiian/Chilean and California daytimes. The latter mostly matters for small asteroids which become bright enough for detection for at most a day or two.

== Discoveries ==
- SN 2018cow, a relatively bright supernova on 2018-06-16.
- 2018 AH, largest asteroid to pass so close to Earth since 1971 on 2018-01-02.
- A106fgF, a 2–5 m asteroid which either passed extremely close or impacted Earth on 2018-01-22.
- 2018 RC, near Earth asteroid on 2018-09-03 (notable because it was discovered more than a day prior to closest approach on 2018-09-09).
- A10bMLz, unknown space debris, so-called "empty trash bag object" on 2019-01-25.
- 2019 MO, an approximately 4 m asteroid which impacted the Caribbean Sea south of Puerto Rico in June 2019
- C/2019 Y4 (ATLAS), comet
- 2020 VT4, a 5–10 m object which passed closer to Earth than any other known near-miss asteroid
- Photographed ejecta from NASA's DART impact on asteroid Dimorphos
- AT2022aedm explosion in an elliptical host galaxy
- 2024 YR4, an asteroid between 53 and 67 metres in diameter.
- 3I/ATLAS, an interstellar object.
- Many other comets, listed here: Comet ATLAS (disambiguation)

== See also ==
- 99942 Apophis
- Asteroid impact avoidance
- Asteroid impact prediction
- Atlas
- B612 Foundation
- Chelyabinsk meteor
- Framework Programmes for Research and Technological Development
- List of near-Earth object observation projects
- Qingyang event
- The Spaceguard Foundation
