= Whiting 1 =

Globular cluster

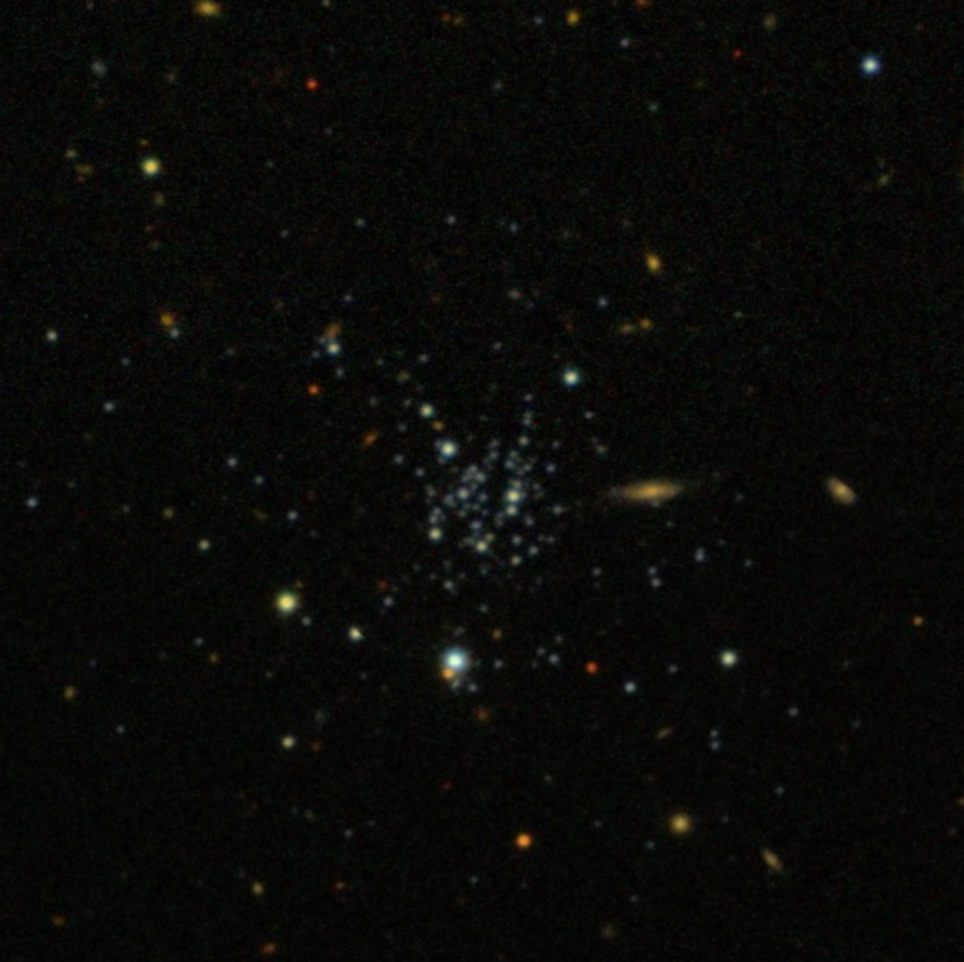

Observation data
- Constellation: Cetus
- Right ascension: 02h 02m 57s
- Declination: -03° 15' 10"
- Distance: 95,900 (30600 ± 1200)
- Apparent magnitude (V): 15.03
- Apparent dimensions (V): 1.2'

Physical characteristics
- Absolute magnitude: -2.46
- Radius: 33
- Estimated age: 5.7 Billion years old
- Other designations: WHI B0200-03; GALEXASC J020257.10-031510.5; [LM2010] 03; 0200-03

Whiting 1 is a faint and unusually young globular cluster in Cetus, in the halo of the Milky Way, having an almost same characteristics as Palomar 1. Many studies shows Whiting 1 to be part of the Sagittarius Dwarf Spheroidal Galaxy. It is a metal-rich cluster. Whiting 1 is 30.1 kilo parsecs away from our Sun and is 34.9 kpc away from our Galactic Center.

It was discovered by Alan B. Whiting, G.K.T. Hau and Mike Irwin in 2002. It was identified as a globular cluster by Giovanni Carraro in 2005.

== Properties ==
A study shows that the Metallicity [Fe/H] (dex) of star cluster Whiting 1 is -0.70 and has an age of 5.0 Billion Light Years (Gyr), indicating it is an ancient star cluster from the early universe. The ellipticity of Whiting 1 is 0.18 ± 0.07, indicating that this star cluster is a fairly or almost round star cluster. The radial velocity (ṽr) of Whiting 1 = -130.6 km/s, detected using the Visible Multi Object Spectrograph (VIMOS). But the Radial Velocity Dispersion of Whiting 1 is not stated in the paper, suggesting that this star cluster does not have many bright stars and it is challenging to be observed.

By using the Gaia data, it presented that the trajectory of Whiting 1 closely matches the orbit of Sagittarius Dwarf Spheroidal Galaxy confirming a physical association of the two systems. Whiting 1 is present in the trailing arm, together with Palomar 12 Star cluster. For Terzan 7, Terzan 8 and Arp 2 are present at the main body, while Messier 54 is at the center of the main body of Sagittarius Dwarf Spheroidal Galaxy (Sgr dSph). Whiting 1 has been recently accreted or detached from the parent galaxy and is now a member of the galactic halo due to tidal stripping of Sagittarius Dwarf Spheroidal Galaxy by the Milky Way Galaxy. The study also suggests that Whiting 1 is losing mass via the tidal stripping by the Milky Way, as the luminosity function and the surface density.
