= Koposov 2 =

Globular cluster in the constellation Gemini

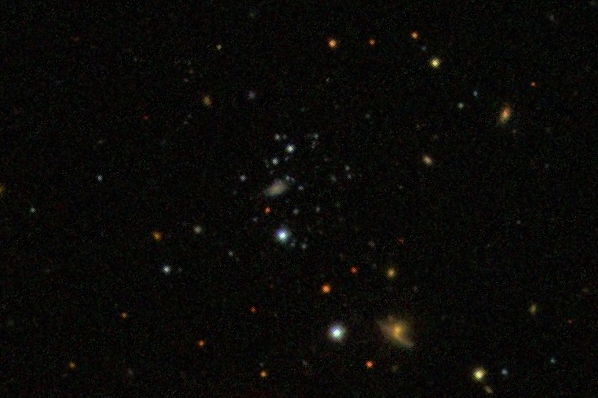

Observation data (J2000 epoch)
- Constellation: Gemini
- Right ascension: 07^{h} 58^{m} 17.0^{s}
- Declination: +26° 15′ 18.0″
- Distance: 113.1 kly (34.7 kpc)
- Apparent magnitude (V): 17.60

Physical characteristics
- Radius: approx. 3 pc (9.8 ly)

Koposov 2 is a low-luminosity globular cluster in the constellation Gemini in the halo of the Milky Way galaxy. It was discovered, along with globular cluster Koposov 1 by S. Koposov et al. in 2007. Koposov 1 and Koposov 2 were described by their discoverers as the "lowest luminosity globular clusters orbiting the Milky Way," along with AM 4, Palomar 1, and Whiting 1.
