= Sagittarius Stream =

Long and elongated structure of stars

In astronomy, the Sagittarius Stream is a long, complex structure made of stars that wrap around the Milky Way Galaxy in an orbit that nearly crosses the galactic poles. It consists of tidally stripped stars from the Sagittarius Dwarf Spheroidal Galaxy, resulting from the process of merging with the Milky Way over a period of billions of years.

This stellar stream was originally proposed in 1995 by Donald Lynden-Bell after analyzing the distribution of globular clusters in the Milky Way. The actual structure was identified by Newberg and associates (2002) plus Majewski and associates (2003) using data from the 2MASS and SDSS surveys.

The geometry of the stream is complex and has been studied extensively using data from surveys and instruments such as GAIA, LAMOST, 2MASS, SDSS, and more. In 2006, Belokurov and collaborators found that the leading arm of the Sagittarius Stream is split into two branches. It is possible that a bifurcation also exists in the trailing arm. The stream is so extended that it wraps around the entire Galaxy two times, and contains many stellar populations and types of stars.

== Spectroscopic analysis ==
As the stream and original galaxy are studied with more depth, more information has been discovered about the metallicity content of the various branches. A spectroscopic study in 2019 showed that faint and bright branches have distinct metallicities, with the bright arm being more metal-rich on average. They also find that the trailing arm, which extends around 100 kpc from the Sun, has a higher metallicity overall than the leading arm.

A more recent study by Muraveva et al. (2025), using RR Lyrae stars from GAIA DR3 to analyze the metallicity distribution, found that the most metal-rich portion of the system is the main body, followed by the trailing arm and then the leading arm. However, they found that the metallicity difference between the two branches in each arm is not very statistically significant. The study used RR Lyrae stars to study the chemical content of the stream because they are old enough to have existed before the original galaxy was accreted by the Milky Way, and would therefore not be affected by any star formation that has happened since then. Since these stars retain information about the metallicity of the progenitor Sagittarius object, the Muraveva study was able to confirm that the progenitor had a small, yet significant metallicity gradient. This contributed to the differences in metal content between the arms, as the more metal-poor stars were stripped in earlier epochs. This indicates that stars in the center were the most metal rich, and the metal content decreased with increasing distance from the center.

== Features ==
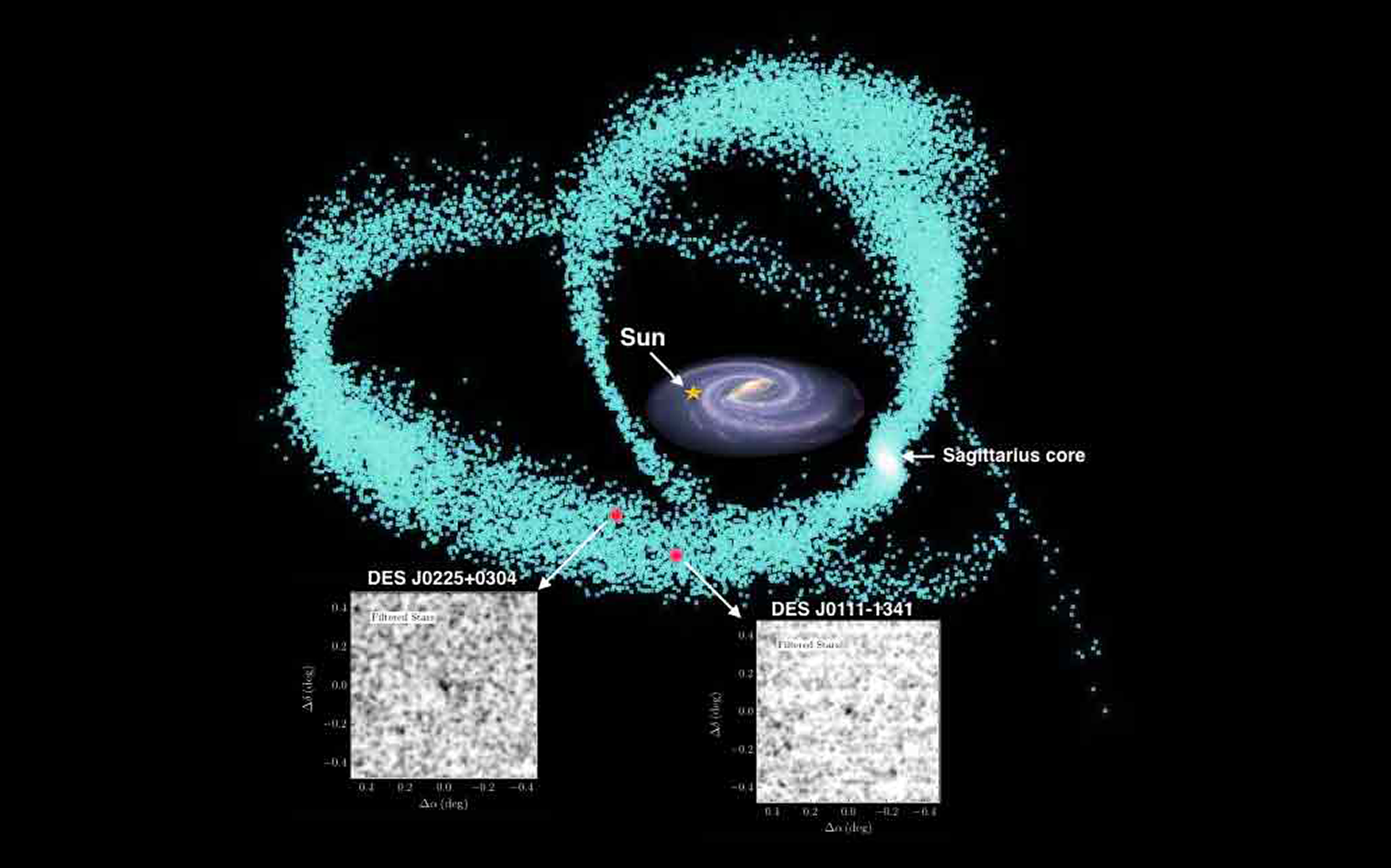
Astronomers have discovered ultra-faint stellar systems in the direction of the Sagittarius stream, the stream of stars that is being pulled out of the Sagittarius dwarf galaxy as it orbits our own Milky Way galaxy.

A 2026 survey of 15,176 stars in the Sagittarius stream using the Transiting Exoplanet Survey Satellite (TESS) searched for evidence of exoplanets, but none were discovered. This is attributed to several factors, including the generally high number of binary stars inhibiting planet formation, the low metallicity. It is difficult to search for exoplanet transits of extragalactic stars because the stars are typically much too faint.

Several globular and open clusters, including Messier 54 and Terzan 8, have been associated with the Sagittarius dwarf galaxy. A 2017 investigation of the Sagittarius stream using the Dark Energy Survey data identified two faint stellar systems that may have been stripped from the galaxy and now exist within the tails. The first system, DES J0111−1341, is categorized as a compact ultrafaint stellar cluster. The second, DES J0225+0304, could potentially be a very small, faint dwarf galaxy. This would be the first observation of an ultrafaint satellite of a satellite. A followup investigation is required to confirm this discovery, including an analysis of the radial velocity and proper motion of these candidates.

== See also ==
- List of stellar streams
