= Koposov 1 =

Globular cluster in the constellation Virgo

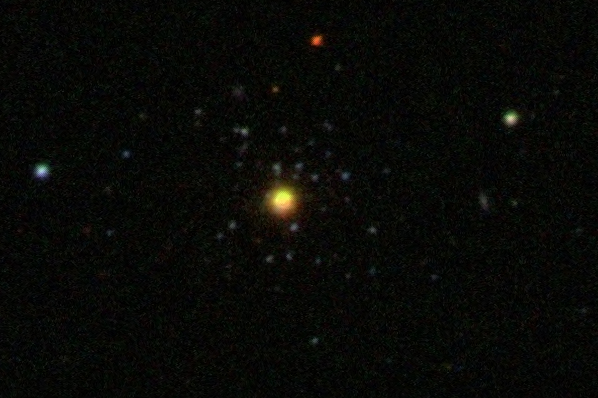

Observation data (J2000 epoch)
- Constellation: Virgo
- Right ascension: 11^{h} 59^{m} 18.05^{s}
- Declination: +12° 15′ 36.0″
- Distance: 157.5 kly (48.3 kpc)
- Apparent magnitude (V): 14.20

Physical characteristics
- Radius: approx. 3 pc (9.8 ly)

Koposov 1 is a low-luminosity globular cluster in the constellation Virgo in the halo of the Milky Way galaxy. It was discovered, along with globular cluster Koposov 2 by S. Koposov et al. in 2007. Koposov 1 and Koposov 2 were described by their discoverers as the "lowest luminosity globular clusters orbiting the Milky Way," along with AM 4, Palomar 1, and Whiting 1.
