= Liller =

Liller may refer to:

== People ==
- Bjarne Liller (1935–1993), Danish jazz musician and singer-songwriter
- William Liller (1927–2021), American astronomer

== Others ==
- 3222 Liller, minor planet
- Liller 1, globular cluster in the constellation Scorpius

== See also ==
- Lillers
