= C/2019 Y1 (ATLAS) =

Non-periodic comet

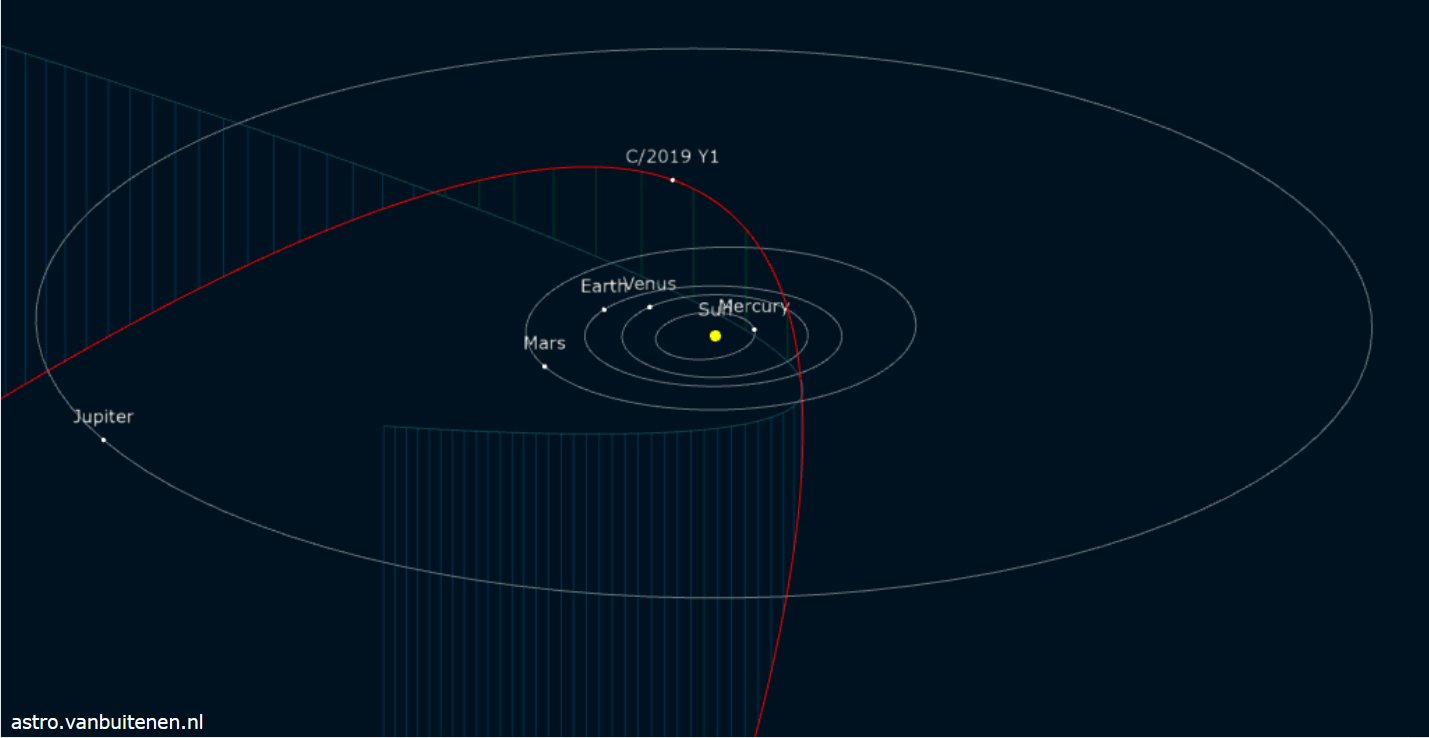
- Near parabolic orbit has its perihelion above the northern ecliptic

Discovery
- Discovered by: J. Robinson
- Discovery site: ATLAS–HKO (T05)
- Discovery date: 16 December 2019

Designations
- Alternative designations: A10iMHA; CK19Y010

Orbital characteristics
- Epoch: 12 April 2020 (JD 2458951.5)
- Observation arc: 208 days
- Number of observations: 1,010
- Aphelion: 669.1457±3.3432 AU
- Perihelion: 0.838 AU
- Semi-major axis: ~240 AU
- Eccentricity: 0.99651
- Orbital period: ~3,720 years
- Inclination: 73.348°
- Longitude of ascending node: 31.366°
- Argument of periapsis: 57.498°
- Mean anomaly: 0.007°
- Last perihelion: 15 March 2020
- Earth MOID: 0.083 AU
- Jupiter MOID: 1.026 AU

Physical characteristics
- Dimensions: 1.2 km (0.75 mi)
- Comet total magnitude (M1): 11.9±1.0
- Comet nuclear magnitude (M2): 13.8±0.5

C/2019 Y1 (ATLAS) is a comet with a near-parabolic orbit discovered by the ATLAS survey on 16 December 2019. It passed perihelion on 15 March 2020 at 0.84 AU from the Sun. Its orbit is very similar to C/1988 A1 (Liller), C/1996 Q1 (Tabur), C/2015 F3 (SWAN) and C/2023 V5 (Leonard), suggesting they may be fragments of a larger ancient comet.

== Observations ==
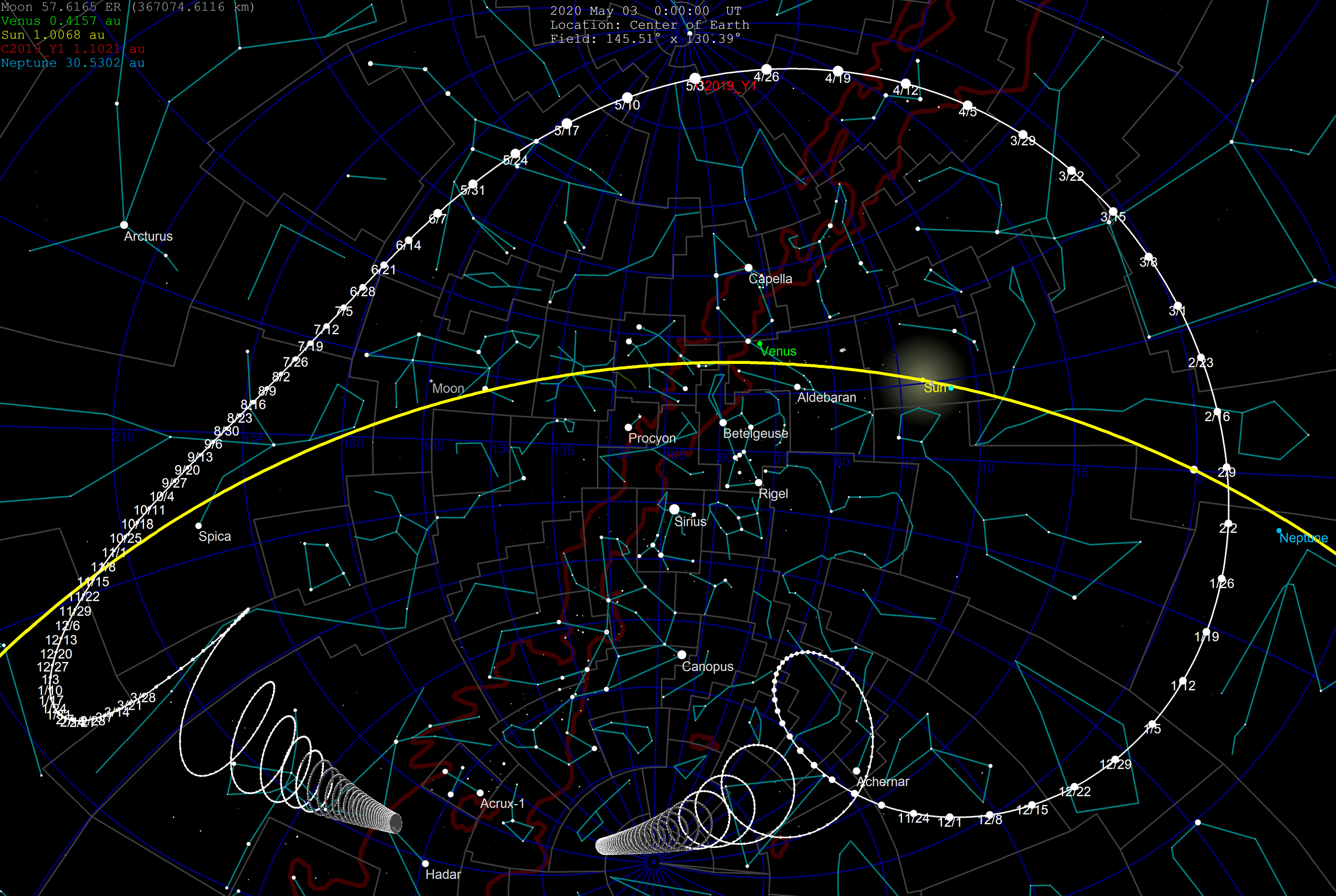
1 week motion across the sky

The comet passed close to Earth in early May 2020. It was visible in the northern hemisphere sky in the spring of 2020.
