= Terzan 1 =

Globular cluster

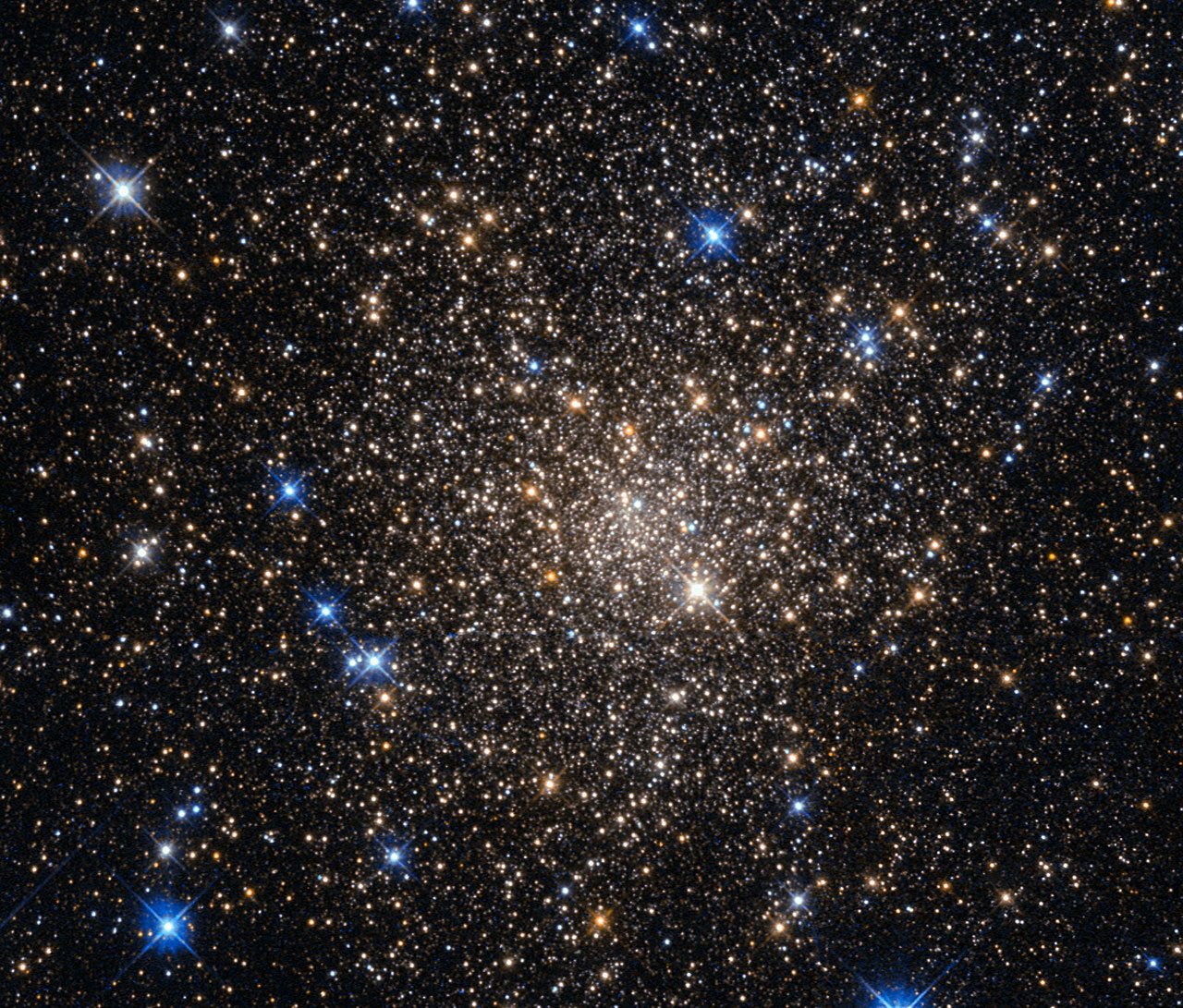
- Terzan 1 image taken with the Wide Field Planetary Camera 2 on board the NASA/ESA Hubble Space Telescope (north is to the right)

Observation data (J2000 epoch)
- Constellation: Scorpius
- Right ascension: 17^{h} 35^{m} 47.8^{s}
- Declination: −30° 28′ 11.0″

Physical characteristics
- Other designations: ESO 455-23, Cl Haute-Provence 2, Cl VDBH 235, [KPS2012] MWSC 2635, C 1732-304, Cl Terzan 1, GCl 69

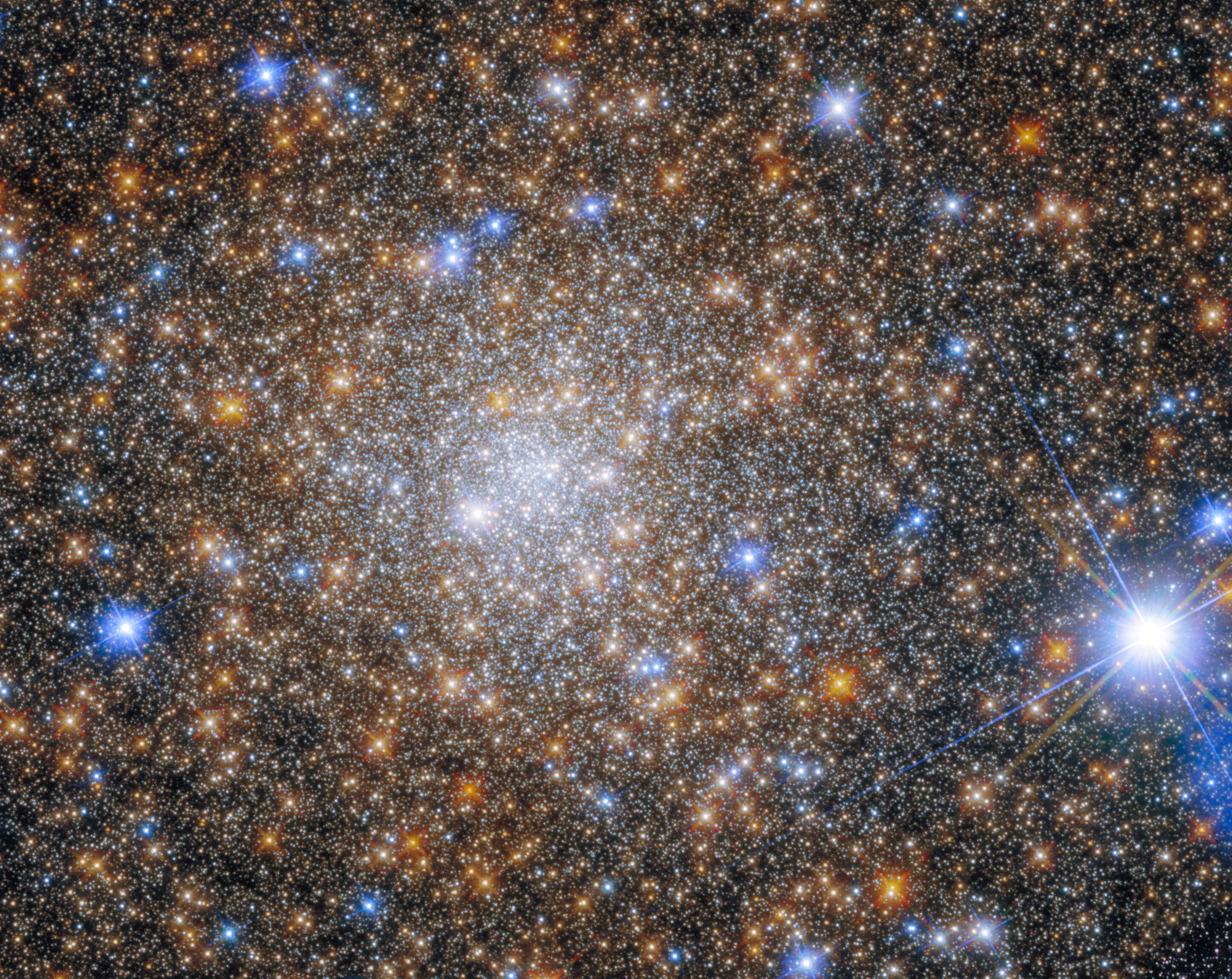
Terzan 1 from the Hubble Space Telescope Wide Field Planetary Camera 2 (north is down)

Terzan 1, also known as ESO 455-23 and Terzan 1966, is a heavily obscured globular cluster located around 20.000 light-years from Earth in the constellation of Scorpius. It is one of about 150 globular clusters discovered by the French astronomer Agop Terzan in the 1960s-70s, belonging to the Milky Way. Terzan 1 is also an X-ray source.

Terzan 1 has the smallest projected distance to the Milky Way’s center among all known globulars: it is only 4,200 light-years from the center but 21,800 light-years from Earth. In 1980, astronomers detected X-ray bursts from a source located in Terzan 1. Several years later, the source X1732-304 was detected within the cluster with NASA’s Spacelab 2 and ESA’s EXOSAT missions.

== See also ==
- Terzan Catalogue
