= Terzan Catalogue =

Astronomical catalogue of globular clusters

- Alternative names: Agop Terzan Catalogue of Globular Star Clusters
- Target: Globular clusters
- Named after: Agop Terzan
- Started: 1966
- Ended: 1971

The Terzan Catalogue (abbreviation: Ter) is an astronomical catalogue of globular clusters.

== Overview ==
The Terzan Catalogue consists of 11 globular clusters discovered by Agop Terzan using infrared observations made at Lyon Observatory in France during the 1960s and early 1970s. Most of the globular clusters are located in the constellations of Sagittarius and Scorpius, near the Milky Way's Galactic Center; Terzan 7 and Terzan 8 are most likely part of the Sagittarius Dwarf Elliptical Galaxy. Although all of the Terzan Catalogue objects were originally presumed to be globular clusters, there have been recent suggestions (by Mikkel Steine and others) that some of them may in fact be open clusters.

Since the original Terzan 11 is a duplicate of Terzan 5, more recent versions of the catalogue have renamed the original Terzan 12 as Terzan 11.

The catalogue is based on scientific papers published by Agop Terzan in 1966 (for Terzan 1), 1967 (for Terzan 2), 1968 (for Terzan 3 to 8), and 1971 (for Terzan 9 to 12).

== List of clusters ==
List of star clusters in the Terzan Catalogue:

Object	Constellation	Right ascension (J2000)	Declination (J2000)	Apparent magnitude	Diameter (′)
Terzan 1	Scorpius	17^{h} 35^{m} 47.8^{s}	−30° 28′ 11″	13.9	2.4'
Terzan 2	Scorpius	17^{h} 27^{m} 33.4^{s}	−30° 48′ 08″	14.29	0.7'
Terzan 3	Scorpius	16^{h} 28^{m} 40.1^{s}	−35° 21′ 13″	12.0	4.0'
Terzan 4	Scorpius	17^{h} 30^{m} 38.9^{s}	−31° 35′ 44″	16.0	0.7'
Terzan 5	Sagittarius	17^{h} 48^{m} 04.9^{s}	−24° 48′ 45″	13.85	2.1'
Terzan 6	Scorpius	17^{h} 50^{m} 46.4^{s}	−31° 16′ 31″	13.85	1.2'
Terzan 7	Sagittarius	19^{h} 17^{m} 43.7^{s}	−34° 39′ 27″	12.0	6.0'
Terzan 8	Sagittarius	19^{h} 41^{m} 45^{s}	−34° 00′ 01″	12.4	4.4'
Terzan 9	Sagittarius	18^{h} 01^{m} 38.8^{s}	−26° 50′ 23″	16.0	1.5'
Terzan 10	Sagittarius	18^{h} 02^{m} 57.4^{s}	−26° 04′ 00″	14.9	b. d.
Terzan 11	Sagittarius	18^{h} 12^{m} 15.8^{s}	−22° 44′ 31″	16.4	1.5'

== Star chart ==
Chart of Terzan globular clusters

== See also ==
- List of astronomical catalogues
- List of globular clusters
