= Terzan 5 =

Globular cluster

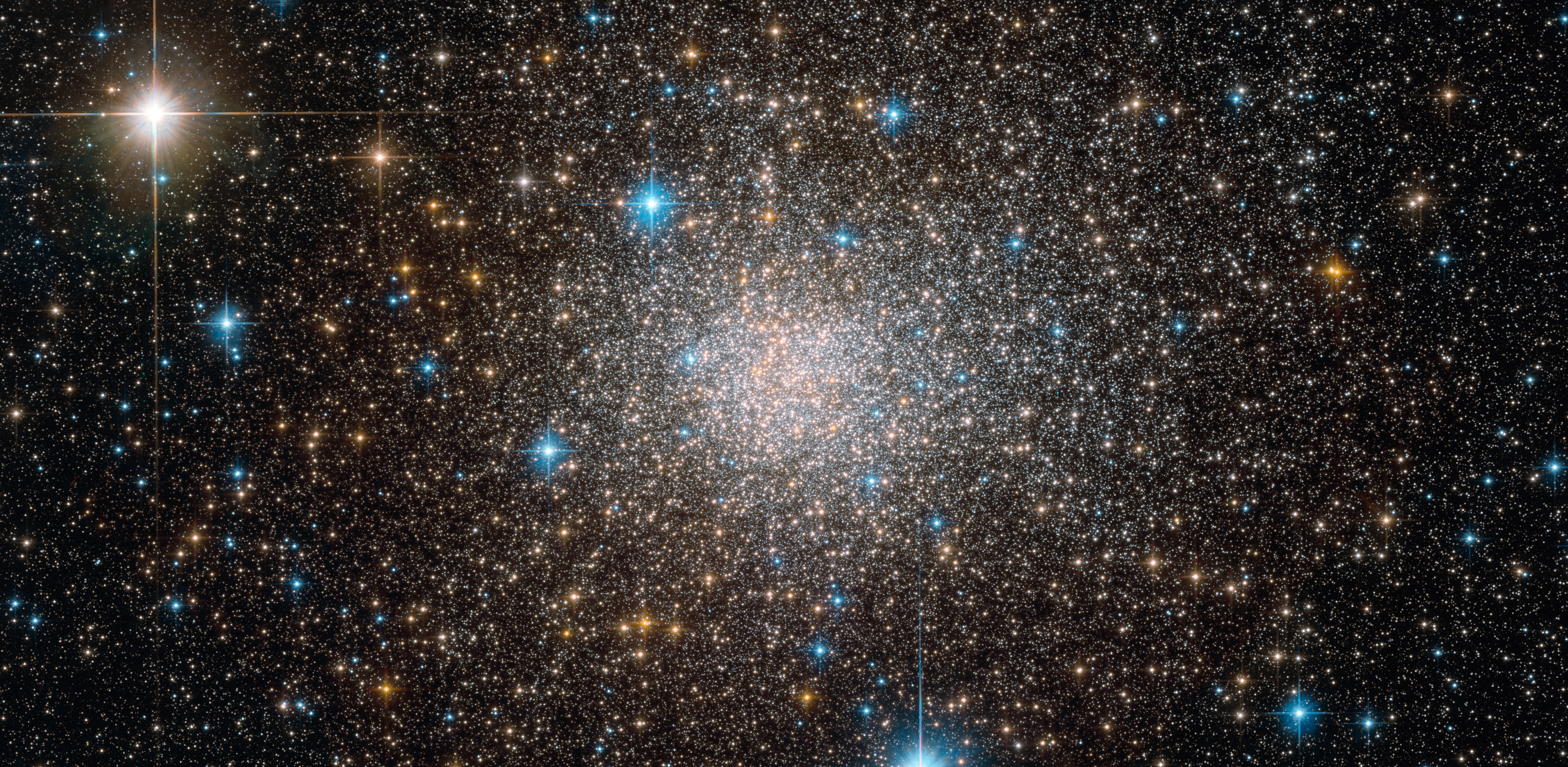
- Hubble image of Terzan 5

Observation data (J2000 epoch)
- Class: G2
- Constellation: Sagittarius
- Right ascension: 17^{h} 48^{m} 05^{s}
- Declination: −24° 46′ 48″
- Distance: 18.8 ± 1.6 kly (Note: The distance estimates have historically varied from as close as 2.3 kpc to as far as 14.6 kpc. The recent estimates generally range from 5.5 to 8.7 kpc.) (5.9 ± 0.5 kpc)
- Apparent magnitude (V): 12.8
- Apparent dimensions (V): 1′02″ (half-mass diameter)

Physical characteristics
- Mass: ~2 million M_{☉} (4 × 10^{36} kg)
- Radius: 2.7 ly (Note: Based on the half-mass radius of 31″ and the known distance of 5.9 kpc. The dense core of the cluster has the radius of 9.0″.)
- V_{HB}: 22.5
- Metallicity: [Fe/H] = −0.21 dex
- Estimated age: 12 Gyr
- Notable features: Possibly the core of a disrupted dwarf galaxy
- Other designations: Ter 5, IRC–20385

Terzan 5 is a stellar system orbiting within the crowded central region of the Milky Way galaxy known as the galaxy's bulge. In 2026, it was reclassified to a novel category of system known as a bulge fossil fragment. It was previously considered to be a heavily obscured globular cluster belonging to the bulge of the Milky Way galaxy. It was one of six globulars discovered by French astronomer Agop Terzan in 1968 and was initially labeled Terzan 11. The cluster was cataloged by the Two-Micron Sky Survey as IRC–20385. It is situated in the constellation Sagittarius in the direction of the Milky Way's center. Terzan 5 probably follows an unknown complicated orbit around the center of the galaxy, but currently it is moving towards the Sun with a speed of around 90 km/s.

== Physical properties ==
The absolute magnitude of Terzan 5 is at least M_{V}=−7.5. Its bolometric luminosity is about 800,000 times that of the Sun, while its mass is about 2 million solar masses. The small core of Terzan 5—about 0.5 pc in size—has one of the highest star densities in the galaxy. Its volume mass density exceeds 10^{6} M_{☉}/pc^{3}, while its volume luminosity density exceeds 10^{5.5} L_{☉}/pc^{3}, where M_{☉} and L_{☉} are the Sun's mass and luminosity, respectively. The cluster also has one of the highest metallicities among the Milky Way's globular clusters—[Fe/H]=−0.21.

In 2009 it was discovered that Terzan 5 consists of at least two generations of stars with ages of 12 and 4.5 billion years and slightly different metallicities, possibly indicating that it is the core of a disrupted dwarf galaxy, not a true globular cluster. There are only a few other globular clusters in the Milky Way that contain stars with different ages. Among them are M54, Omega Centauri and Liller 1. The latter, like Terzan 5, is thought to be a fossil fragment from the assembly of the galactic bulge. The cluster also contains around 1300 core helium burning horizontal branch (HB) stars, including at least one RR Lyrae variable star.

== Pulsars and X-ray sources ==
Terzan 5 is known to contain 49 millisecond radio pulsars as of December 2023, the largest MSP population among all globular clusters in the Galaxy; their true number may be as high as 200. The first such object, PSR B1744-24A, discovered in 1990, has the period of 11.56 ms. The population of pulsars inside Terzan 5 includes PSR J1748–2446ad, the fastest known millisecond pulsar, which is spinning at 716 Hz (the rotation period is 1.40 ms).

Terzan 5 also contains an X-ray burster, discovered in 1980, known as Terzan 5 or XB 1745-25. It also contains around 50 weaker X-ray sources, many of which are likely Low-mass X-ray binaries (LMXB) or cataclysmic variables.

The large number of X-ray sources and millisecond pulsars may be a direct consequence of the high density of the cluster's core, which leads to a high rate of star collisions, and to formation of close binaries, including binary systems which contain a neutron star.

In addition to discrete X-ray sources Terzan 5 produces a diffuse non-thermal X-ray emission and high (a few GeV) and very-high (0.5–24 TeV) energy gamma-rays. The high energy gamma rays probably originate in the magnetosphere of abundant millisecond pulsars, while very-high energy gamma rays likely result from the inverse Compton scattering by the relativistic electrons emitted by the pulsars off the cosmic microwave background radiation.

== Gallery ==
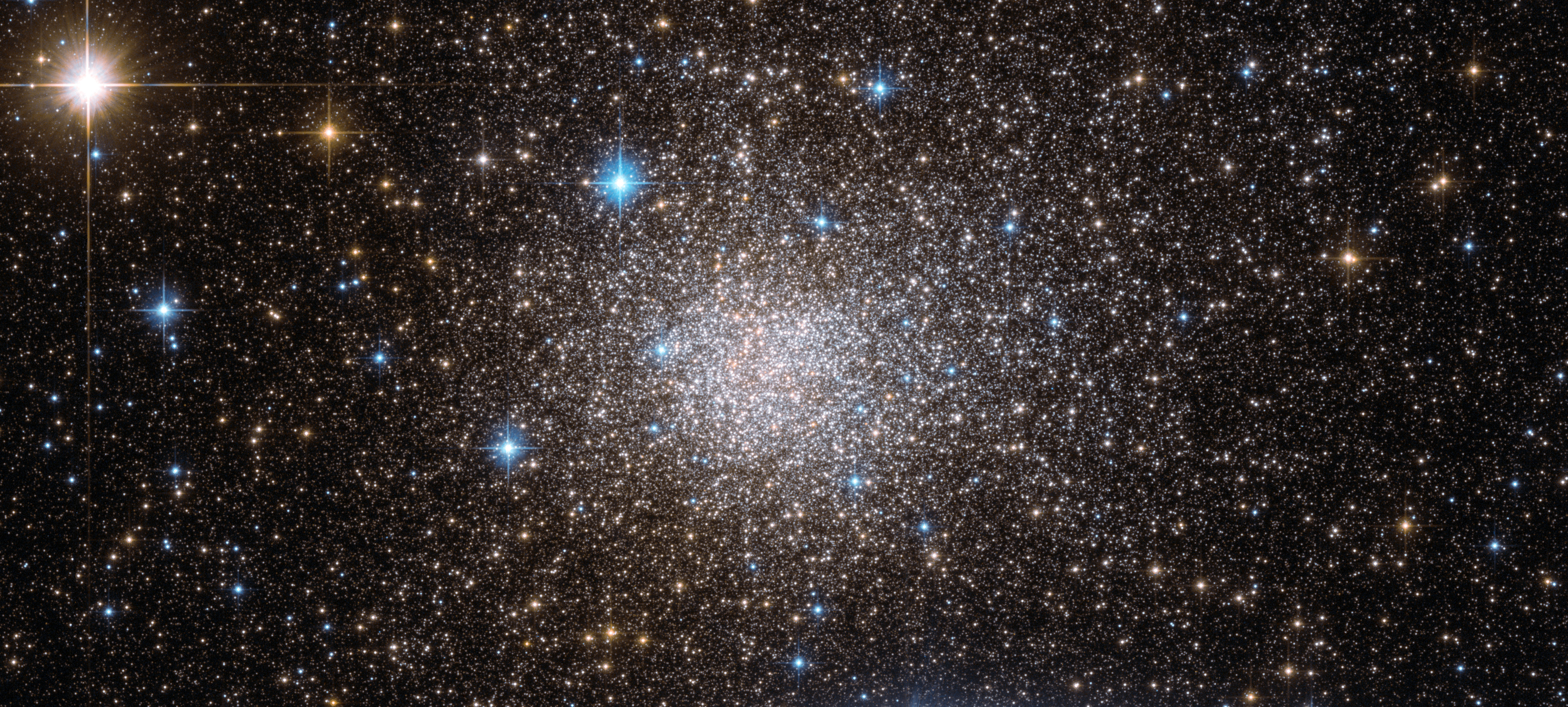
Hubble Space Telescope image of the ancient globular cluster Terzan 5

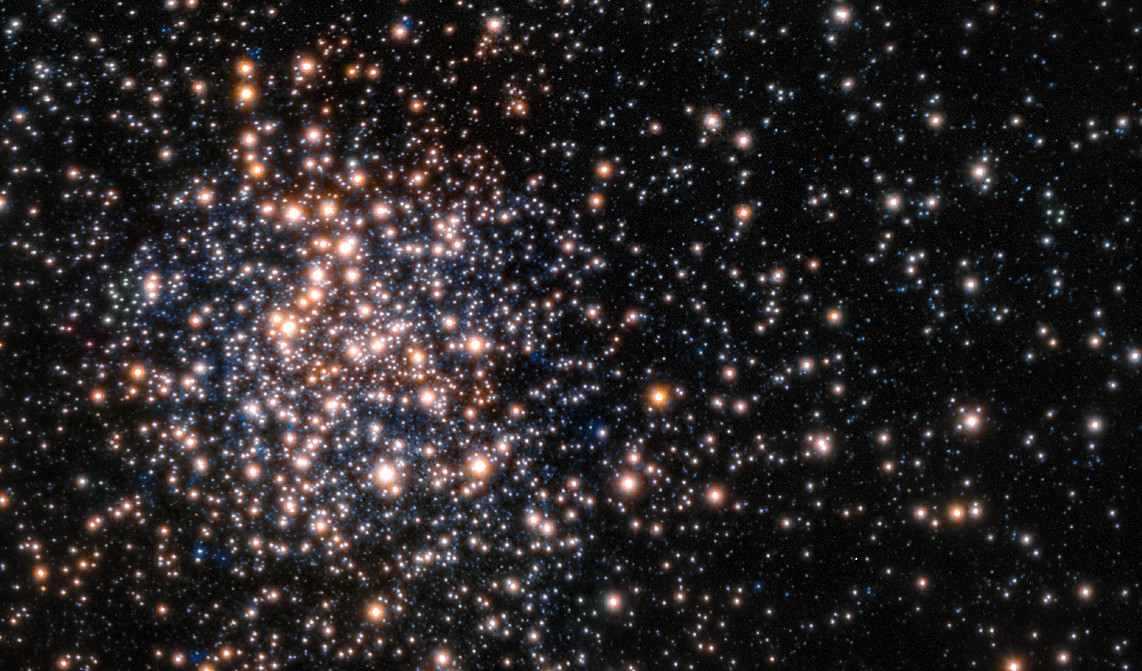
Terzan 5 is one of the bulge's primordial building blocks, most likely the relic of the very early days of the Milky Way.

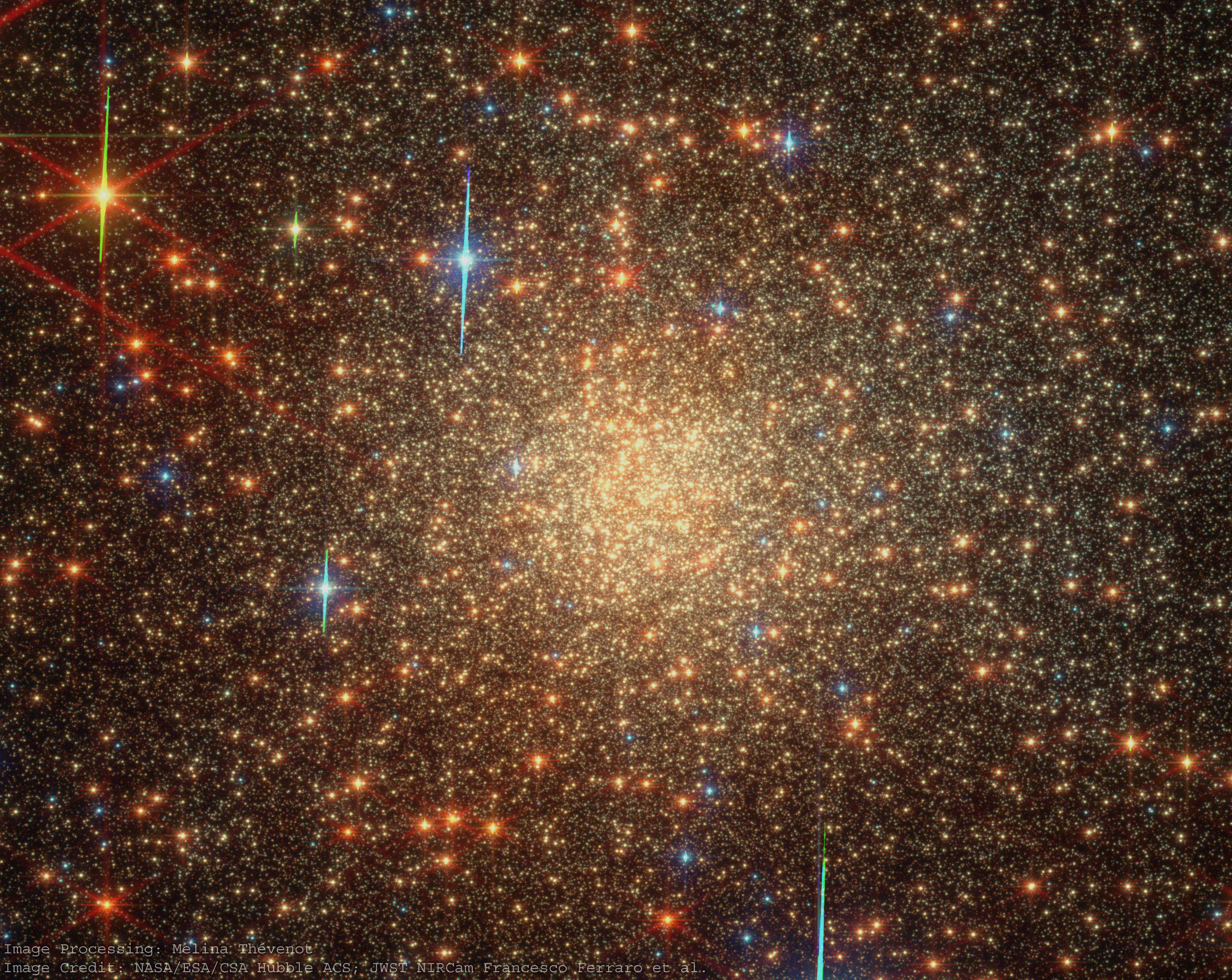
Terzan 5 with Hubble and James Webb Space Telescope

== See also ==
- Terzan Catalogue
- Liller 1
