= Terzan 2 =

Globular cluster

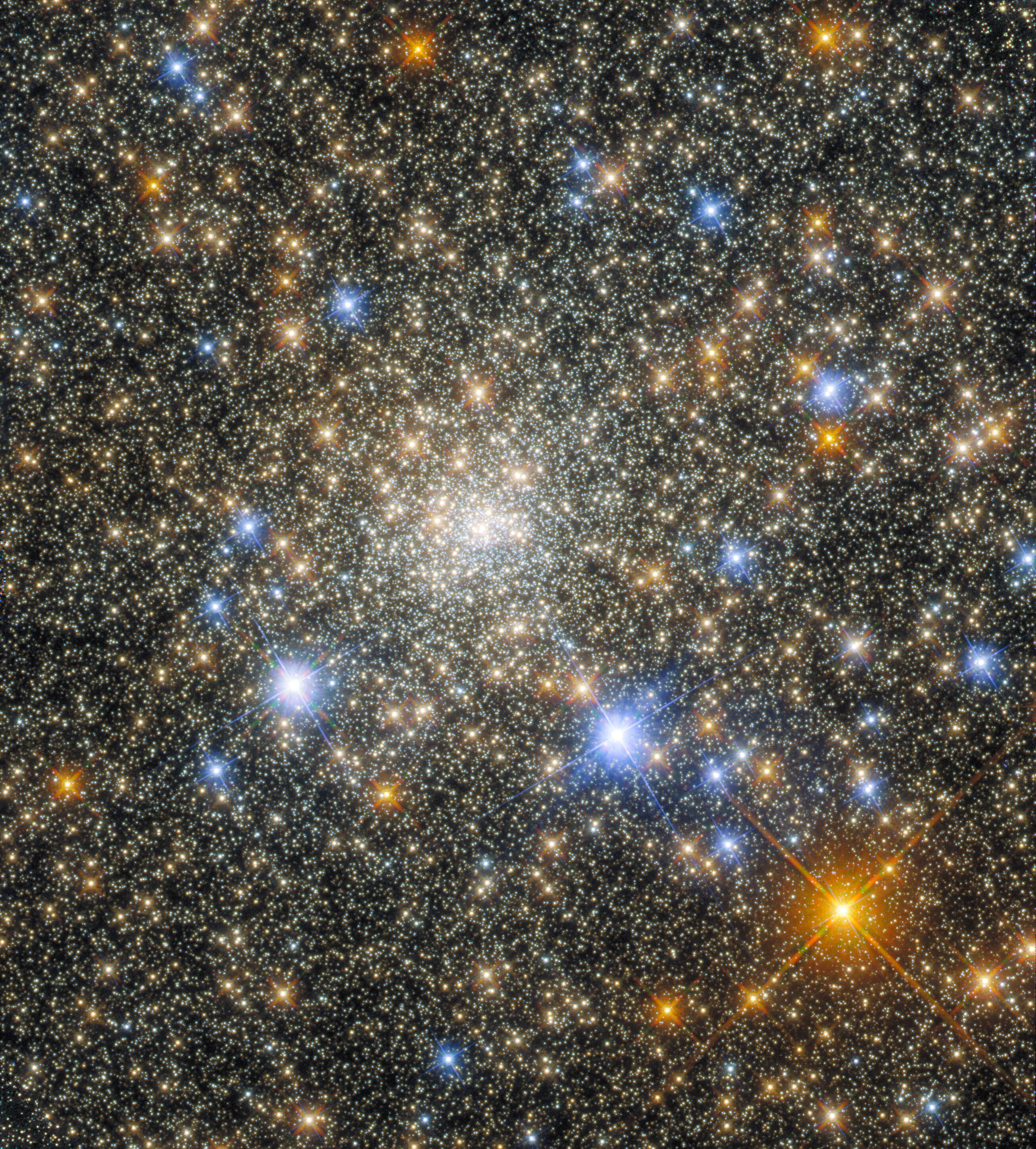
- Terzan 2 imaged by the Hubble Space Telescope

Observation data
- Constellation: Scorpius
- Right ascension: 17^{h} 27^{m} 33.24^{s}
- Declination: −30° 48′ 7.8″
- Apparent magnitude (V): 14.29
- Apparent dimensions (V): 0.6′

Physical characteristics
- Radius: 100-200
- Metallicity: [Fe/H] = [Fe/H]= −0.84 ± 0.04 dex
- Other designations: Terzan 2, Haute-Provence 3, ESO 454-29, VDBH 228, GCl 64.1

Terzan 2 (also known as ESO 454-29) is a heavily obscured globular cluster located in the constellation of Scorpius. It was discovered by the French astronomer Agop Terzan in the 1967.

Terzan 2 is a metal-rich globular cluster located in the Milky Way's galactic bulge. The orbit of the cluster is chaotic. Each pass through the galactic bar, it is disrupted and sent in a slightly different path, meaning it never has a clear enough path to create a stable orbit. The structure of the cluster is itself chaotic, with both retrograde and prograde motion observed in the movement of its stars. Low mass X-ray binary 4U 1724-307 is also located in Terzan 2.

== See also ==
- Terzan Catalogue
