= Terzan 8 =

Globular cluster

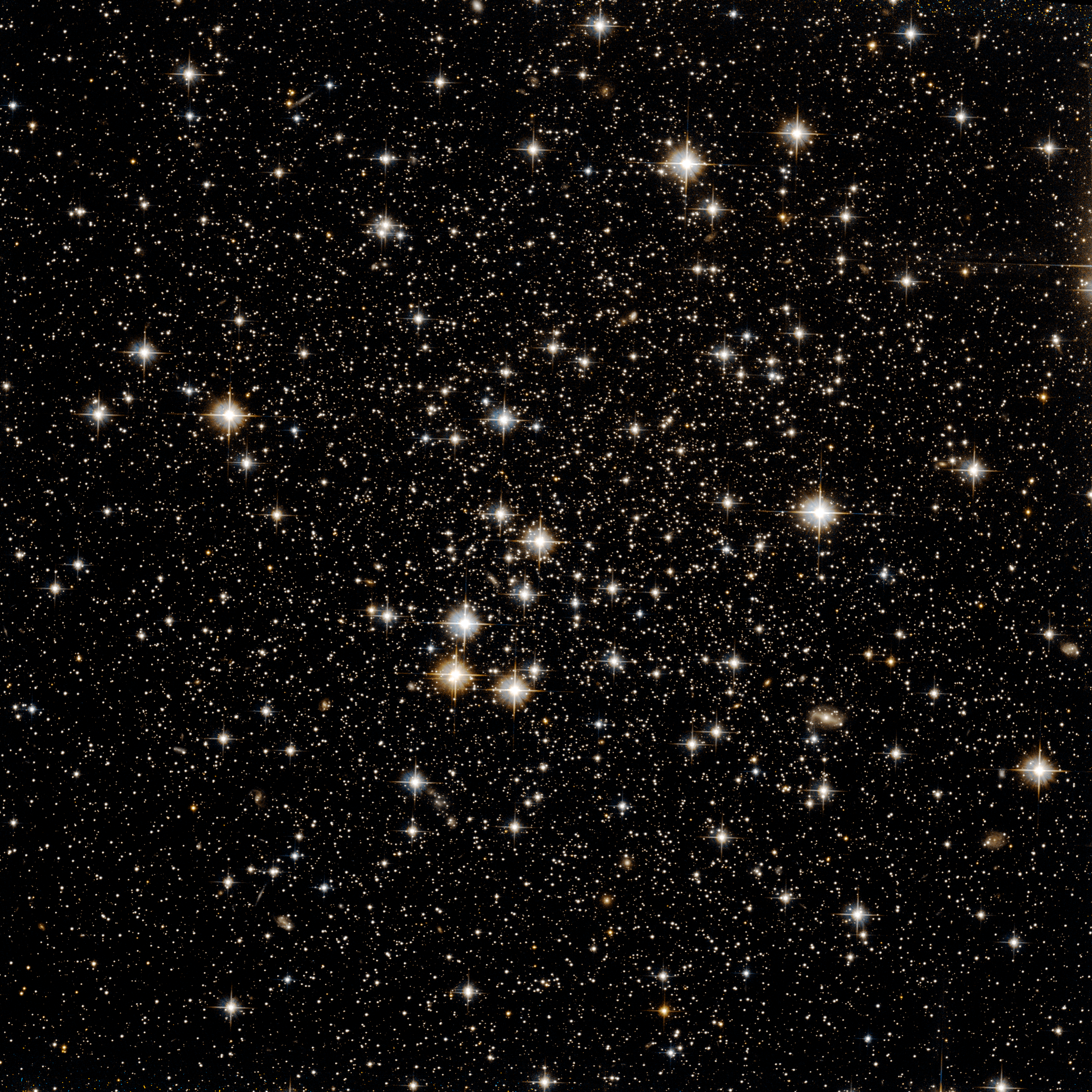
- Terzan 8 imaged by Hubble Space Telescope

Observation data
- Constellation: Sagittarius
- Right ascension: 19h 41m 44.41s
- Declination: -33° 59' 58.1"
- Distance: 85,700
- Apparent magnitude (V): 12.4
- Apparent dimensions (V): 4.4'

Physical characteristics
- Absolute magnitude: -5.07
- Other designations: GCl 113.1, C 1938-341, [KPS2012] MWSC 3156

Terzan 8 is a globular cluster in Sagittarius. It was discovered by Agop Terzan in 1968. Like nearby Terzan 7, It is thought to be part of the Sagittarius Dwarf Spheroidal Galaxy.

Terzan 8 is a low-mass and metal-poor globular cluster. Uncharacteristic of globular clusters, Terzan 8 contains only one age group of stars. The reason for this is currently unknown. What is known is that the cluster formed in a satellite galaxy that has now been absorbed into the Milky Way, possible the Sagittarius Dwarf Spheroidal Galaxy.

== See also ==
- Terzan Catalogue
