= Gerry Gilmore =

New Zealand academic (born 1951)

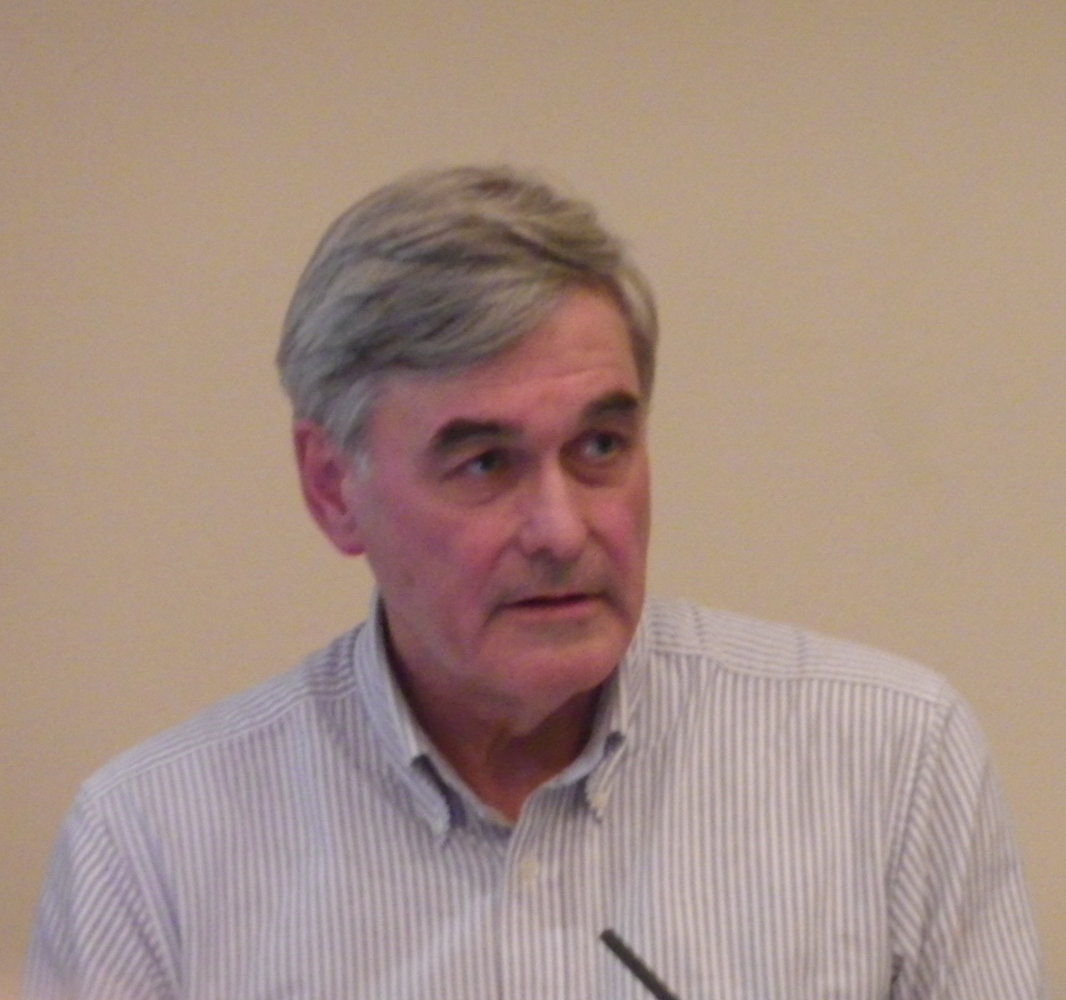
- Gilmore in 2016
- Born: Gerard Francis Gilmore; 7 November 1951 (age 74); Timaru, New Zealand
- Education: University of Canterbury (BS, PhD); University of Cambridge (MA, ScD)
- Known for: Discovery of the Sagittarius Dwarf Spheroidal Galaxy
- Awards: FRS (2015); ScD (2002); FRAS; FInstP
- Scientific career
- Workplaces: University of Cambridge; European Southern Observatory
- Thesis: Observational extragalactic astronomy: an investigation of southern quasars and related objects (1979)
- Doctoral advisor: Ken Fea
- Website: ast.cam.ac.uk/~gil

Gerard Francis Gilmore (born 7 November 1951) is a New Zealand academic who is Emeritus Professor of Experimental Philosophy, in the Institute of Astronomy, at the University of Cambridge. His research has centred on studying stars in the Galaxy to understand its structure and evolutionary history.

== Education ==
Gilmore was educated at St Bede's College, Christchurch and the University of Canterbury (both in New Zealand), where he was awarded a Bachelor of Science degree in 1973.

Gilmore remained at the University of Canterbury as a postgraduate research student. He used the 0.61-metre telescope at Mount John University Observatory to monitor changes in the brightnesses of quasars in the southern hemisphere of the sky. He measured the magnitudes of about 130 quasars from a large number of photographic plates. He found the results were best explained by the infall of gas on to supermassive black holes. This research led to the award of a PhD degree in 1979.

== Royal Observatory, Edinburgh ==
Gerry Gilmore worked as a research fellow at the Royal Observatory, Edinburgh, Scotland, between 1979 and 1984. He used the expertise gained during his PhD to measure brightnesses and numbers of stars from photographic sky surveys. Working with Neil Reid with data from the United Kingdom Schmidt Telescope, he found an excess of faint stars compared to standard models of the Galaxy that represented the distribution of stars as two simple components. Gilmore and Reid argued the observed numbers of stars implied the existence of an additional component they called the thick disc that exists alongside the main Galactic disc and the stellar halo.

== University of Cambridge ==
Gilmore moved to the Institute of Astronomy of the University of Cambridge in 1984 on being awarded an advanced research fellowship by the Science and Engineering Research Council. He used observations of spectra of stars to study the structure of the Galaxy, particularly by measuring their radial velocities. Working with Konrad Kuijken, he used spectra of faint stars in the region around the South Galactic Pole obtained with the Anglo-Australian Telescope to measure the stars' radial velocities, and consequently to determine the surface mass density of the Galactic disc. They showed that there was little or no dark matter within the disc other than that part of the Galactic dark matter halo that extends through the disc. Consequently, dark matter within the Galaxy does not concentrate within the disc.

With Pavel Kroupa and Christopher Tout, Gilmore determined the numbers of low-mass stars in the disc of the Galaxy, improving on previous measurements.

During a survey of the motions of stars in the central regions of the Galaxy, Rodrigo Ibata, Gilmore and Michael Irwin found stars having radial velocities that were different to those of Galactic stars. They concluded that these belonged to a dwarf galaxy in the process of merging with our own Galaxy, and which is today called the Sagittarius Dwarf Spheroidal Galaxy.

Gilmore has collaborated with a large number of scientists, including Rosemary Wyse. He has used observations of the radial velocities of stars in the dwarf spheroidal galaxy companions of the Galaxy to determine the relative contribution of dark matter to these systems.

In 1994 he was appointed to a readership in astrophysics in the University of Cambridge. In 2000 he was promoted to professor of experimental philosophy.

Gilmore has had an important role in the design and scientific strategy of the European Space Agency's Gaia spacecraft that is measuring the positions, motions and brightnesses of millions of stars in the Galaxy.

== Awards and honours ==
Gilmore was elected a Fellow of the Royal Society (FRS) in 2013. His nomination reads:

Gerry Gilmore leads efforts to understand the structure and origin of our Galaxy. He led a revival of star-count analysis that first showed that the Galaxy possesses a "thick" disc, and helped to show that the thick disc formed early in the Galaxy's life. Our current understanding of how the masses of stars are distributed at birth was produced by Gilmore's team. In the early 1990s with a student he obtained the still standard estimate of the mass surface density associated with the discs. This study set the pattern of future work. He pioneered the use of spectral surveys to unravel the Galaxy's history through its chemistry and established that stars in the halo of the Galaxy are chemically distinct from stars in the Galaxy's satellites, even though much of the halo must consist of stars stripped from satellites. In 1994 with a student he discovered the Galaxy's most important satellite after the Magellanic Clouds. As its leading UK proponent, Gilmore played a big role in selection of ESA's revolutionary Gaia mission. He is the driving force behind the ESO-Gaia survey, which has over 250 co-investigators and will obtain spectra designed to complement data from Gaia.

Gilmore was awarded a Master of Arts degree and a Doctor of Science (ScD) degree from Clare Hall, Cambridge in 2002.

== Selected works ==
- Mackey, A. D., and G. F. Gilmore. "Surface brightness profiles and structural parameters for 53 rich stellar clusters in the Large Magellanic Cloud." Monthly Notices of the Royal Astronomical Society 338, no. 1 (2003): 85–119.
- Maund, Justyn R., Stephen J. Smartt, Rolf P. Kudritzki, Philipp Podsiadlowski, and Gerard F. Gilmore. "The massive binary companion star to the progenitor of supernova 1993J." Nature 427, no. 6970 (2004): 129.
- Watkins, L. L., N. W. Evans, Vasily Belokurov, M. C. Smith, Paul C. Hewett, Daniel M. Bramich, Gerard F. Gilmore et al. "Substructure revealed by RR Lyraes in SDSS Stripe 82." Monthly Notices of the Royal Astronomical Society 398, no. 4 (2009): 1757–1770.
- Wilkinson, Mark I., Jan T. Kleyna, N. Wyn Evans, Gerard F. Gilmore, Michael J. Irwin, and Eva K. Grebel. "Kinematically cold populations at large radii in the Draco and Ursa minor dwarf spheroidal galaxies." The Astrophysical Journal Letters 611, no. 1 (2004): L21.
- Smartt, Stephen J., Justyn R. Maund, Margaret A. Hendry, Christopher A. Tout, Gerard F. Gilmore, Seppo Mattila, and Chris R. Benn. "Detection of a red supergiant progenitor star of a Type II-plateau supernova." Science 303, no. 5657 (2004): 499–503.
