= NGC 5634 =

Globular cluster in the constellation Virgo

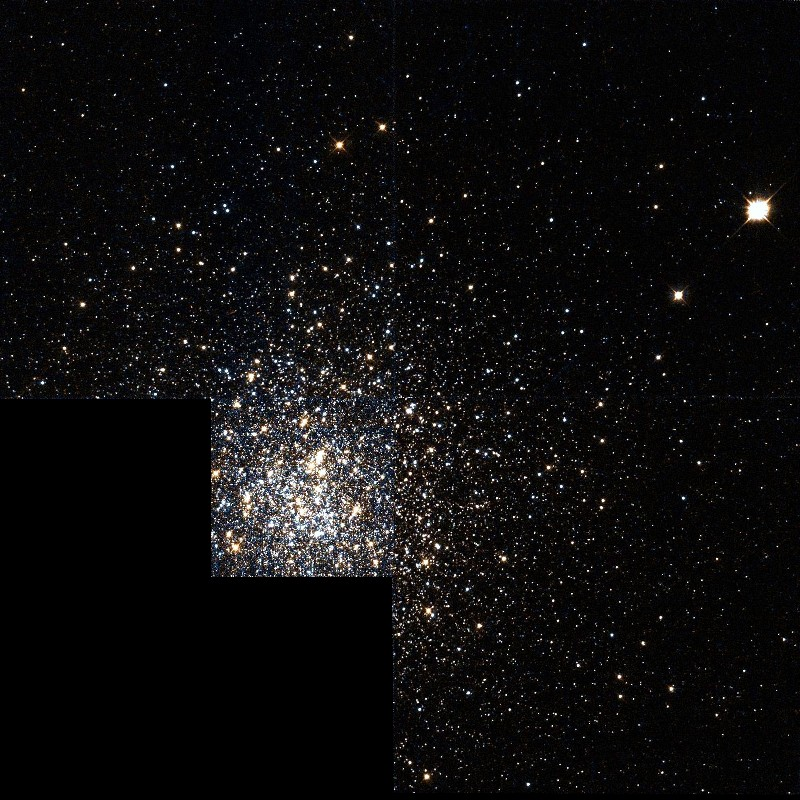
- The globular cluster NGC 5634 imaged by the Hubble Space Telescope

Observation data (J2000 epoch)
- Class: IV
- Constellation: Virgo
- Right ascension: 14^{h} 29^{m} 37.28^{s}
- Declination: −05° 58′ 35.1″
- Distance: 81.9 ± 3.8 kly (25.12 ± 1.16 kpc)
- Apparent magnitude (V): 10.05

Physical characteristics
- Radius: 2.45' x 2.45'
- Metallicity: [Fe/H] = −1.8 ± 0.1 dex
- Estimated age: 12.8 ± 0.3 Gyr
- Other designations: GCl 28, GCRV 8456

NGC 5634 is a globular cluster in the constellation Virgo, located about 82,000 light years (25.12 kiloparsecs) from Earth. NGC 5634 has an apparent magnitude of about 10 and a diameter of 4 or 5 arcminutes. Its Shapley–Sawyer Concentration Class is IV, meaning the cluster shows intermediate rich concentrations. The star near the upper right is the eleventh-magnitude UCAC2 29844847. There is also a bright orange giant, HD 127119, about 1.3 arcminutes away from the cluster.

The origin of NGC 5634 is somewhat unclear; it was once thought to be a likely member of the Sagittarius Dwarf Spheroidal Galaxy, but it may be associated with Gaia-Sausage-Enceladus or the Helmi stream instead.
