= C/1988 A1 (Liller) =

Long-period comet

Discovery
- Discovered by: William Liller
- Discovery site: Vina del Mar, Chile
- Discovery date: 11 January 1988

Designations
- Alternative designations: 1988a, 1988 V

Orbital characteristics
- Epoch: 26 April 1988 (JD 2447277.5)
- Observation arc: 184 days
- Number of observations: 427
- Aphelion: 489 AU
- Perihelion: 0.841 AU
- Semi-major axis: 245 AU
- Eccentricity: 0.9988
- Orbital period: 3,830 years
- Inclination: 73.322°
- Longitude of ascending node: 31.515°
- Argument of periapsis: 57.388°
- Last perihelion: 31 March 1988
- T_{Jupiter}: 0.347
- Earth MOID: 0.086 AU
- Jupiter MOID: 1.01 AU

Physical characteristics
- Comet total magnitude (M1): 6.6
- Apparent magnitude: 5

C/1988 A1 (Liller) is a non-periodic comet discovered on 11 January 1988 by William Liller. The comet is part of a family of comets, known as the Liller family, which also includes the comets C/1996 Q1 (Tabur), C/2015 F3 (SWAN), C/2019 Y1 (ATLAS), and C/2023 V5 (Leonard).

== Observational history ==
The comet was discovered by William Liller in two images exposed 30 minutes apart during the PROBLICOM survey on 11 January. He described the comet as diffuse with a coma about one arcminute across and with faint condensation. The presence of the comet was confirmed by T. Cragg and R. H. McNaught. They estimated visually that the comet had an apparent magnitude of 10.2 and a coma 6 arcminutes across. Upon discovery the comet was located in the constellation of Sculptor, at a solar elongation of 60°, and was located 1.62 AU from the Sun.

The comet was observed to brighten from mag 10 to mag 9 until the end of January and continued to brighten in February and March, reaching mag. 7 at the end of the month. The comet reached minimum elongation on 13 March, on 25°. It reached its peak brightness in April. Jacobson spotted the comet with naked eye on April 18. David H. Levy reported that the comet had an apparent magnitude of 4.7 with the naked eye on April 24. In the end of April the tail of the comet was reported to be up to 2–3 degrees long. An antitail 0.2 degrees long was also reported from 21 to 23 April. The comet was fading in May. Closest approach to Earth took place on May 12, 1988, at a distance on 1.22 AU. By the end of May its magnitude was reported to be 7-7.4.

By July the comet was very faint and diffuse. It was last observed on 12 August 1988, when it had an apparent magnitude of 12 and its coma was 1.3–1.4 arcminutes across.

== Orbit ==
Brian G. Marsden calculated a parabolic orbit on 17 January 1988 with positions available up to that day which indicated a perihelion date on 31.61 March 1988, an orbit that proved quite accurate. The first orbit with positions spanning throughout the visibility period was published by Daniel Green in August 1988, taking into account the perturbations of all planets. That orbit had a perihelion date on March 31.11 and a period of about 3833 years.

After the orbit of comet C/1996 Q1 (Tabur) was calculated, Jost Jahn noticed it had a striking similarity with that of comet C/1988 A1 (Liller), indicating they got separated in a previous perihelion. Zdenek Sekanina mentioned that they could have been separated in their previous perihelion by non tidal forces. The following years three more comets were associated with comet Liller, C/2015 F3 (SWAN), C/2019 Y1 (ATLAS), and C/2023 V5 (Leonard).
