= C/2023 V5 (Leonard) =

Hyperbolic comet

Discovery
- Discovered by: Greg J. Leonard
- Discovery date: 6 November 2023

Orbital characteristics
- Epoch: 2023-Nov-07
- Observation arc: 9 days
- Number of observations: 148
- Orbit type: hyperbolic
- Perihelion: 0.846 AU
- Eccentricity: 1.008
- Inclination: 73.6°
- Longitude of ascending node: 31.52°
- Argument of periapsis: 57.0°
- Last perihelion: 13 December 2023
- Earth MOID: 0.089 AU
- Jupiter MOID: 0.915 AU
- Comet total magnitude (M1): 21.4

C/2023 V5 (Leonard) was discovered on 6 November 2023 by the Catalina Sky Survey. It came to perihelion on 13 December 2023 at 0.849 AU (127.0 million km), from the Sun. It is probably a Liller family comet, together with C/1988 A1 (Liller), C/1996 Q1 (Tabur), C/2015 F3 (SWAN), and C/2019 Y1 (ATLAS).

== Orbit ==
JPL Horizons shows both an inbound and outbound eccentricity greater than 1.

Comet C/2023 V5 is probably a secondary fragment of one of the primary fragments of C/1988 A1 (Liller).
