= Terzan 7 =

Globular cluster

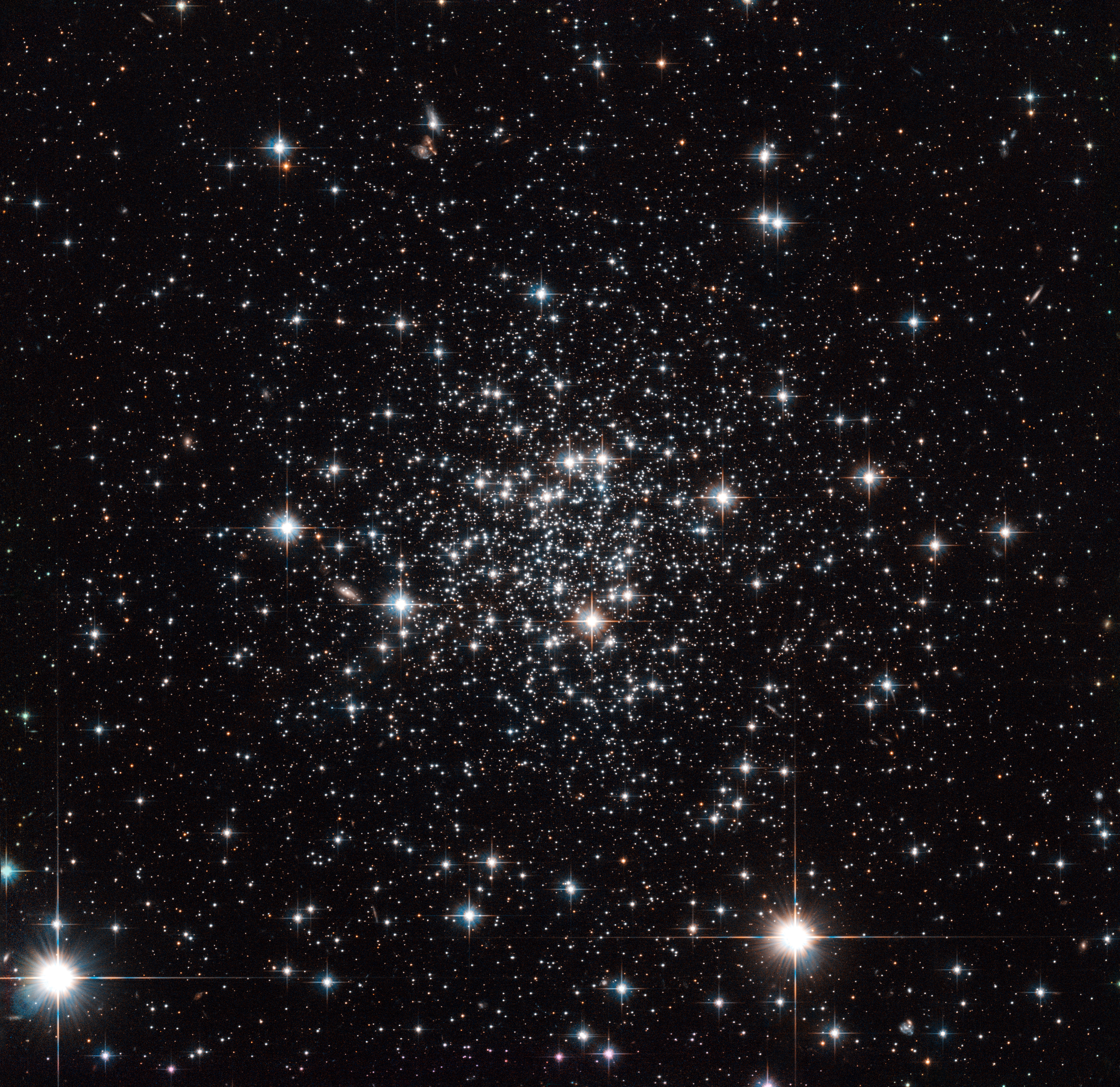
- Terzan7 by Hubble Space Telescope; 3.5′ view

Observation data (J2000 epoch)
- Constellation: Sagittarius
- Right ascension: 19^{h} 17^{m} 43.92^{s}
- Declination: −34° 39′ 27.8″
- Distance: 75.7 kly (23.2 kpc)
- Apparent magnitude (V): 12.0
- Apparent dimensions (V): 7.3′

Physical characteristics
- Radius: 160 ly^{[a]}
- V_{HB}: 17.76
- Estimated age: 7.5 Gyr
- Notable features: young extragalactic globular
- Other designations: Ter 7, GCl 109.1

Terzan 7 is a sparse and young globular cluster that is believed to have originated in the Sagittarius Dwarf Spheroidal Galaxy (Sag DEG) and is physically associated with it. It is relatively metal rich with [Fe/H] = -0.6 and an estimated age of 7.5 Gyr. Terzan 7 has low levels of nickel ([Ni/Fe] = -0.2) which supports its membership in the Sag DEG system since it has a similar chemical signature. It has a rich population of blue stragglers that are strongly concentrated toward the center of Terzan 7. It has an average luminosity distribution of M_{v} = -5.05. It has a half-light radius (R_{h}) of 6.5pc.

== History ==
Terzan 7 was the brightest of six globulars discovered by Turkish-Armenian astronomer Agop Terzan in 1968.

== Young globular ==
Nearly all globular clusters of the Milky Way's galactic halo formed at the same time (12-15 Gyr). Even the far situated NGC 2419 (~100 kpc from Galactic Center) has a similar age. This trend also applies to the age of globulars found in the Large Magellanic Cloud and Fornax Dwarf (~140 kpc from Galactic Center). However, a few globulars seem to be significantly younger than the rest; these include Palomar 1, Palomar 3, Palomar 4, Palomar 12, Palomar 14, Ruprecht 106, IC 4499, Arp 2, Eridanus, Fornax 4, and Terzan 7. In particular, the ones associated with the Sag DEG appear to have formed more recently. The data suggests that all the present outer halo globulars may have originally formed in dwarf spheroidals.

=== Hierarchical galaxy formation ===
Alternatively, a hierarchical galaxy formation model is hypothesized under which a portion, possibly large, of the Milky Way's globular clusters would have originated in the accretion of other dwarf spheroidals like Sag DEG. The best candidate for this idea is Palomar 12.

== See also ==
- Terzan Catalogue

== Notes ==
1. 75.7 kly × tan( 7.3′ / 2 ) = 160 ly. radius
