= Liller 1 =

Globular cluster

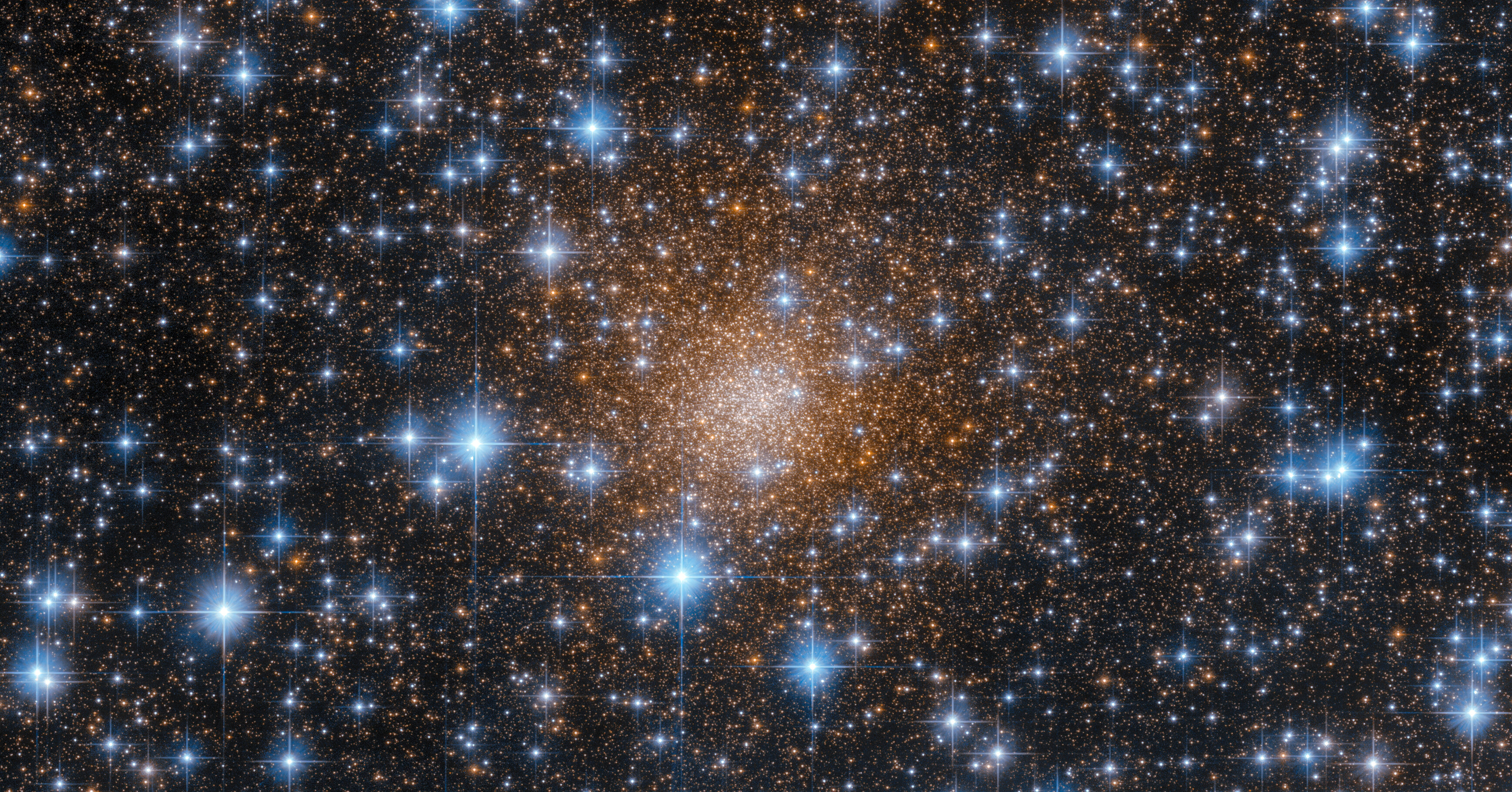
- Liller 1 image from HST

Observation data (J2000 epoch)
- Constellation: Scorpius
- Right ascension: 17^{h} 33^{m} 24.5^{s}
- Declination: −33° 23′ 20″
- Distance: 26.4 ± 3.3 kly (8.1 ± 1.0 kpc)
- Apparent dimensions (V): 22″ (half-mass diameter)

Physical characteristics
- Mass: ~2.3×10^{6} M_{☉}
- Metallicity: [Fe/H] = −0.36 dex
- Other designations: C1730-333, MXB1730-333, J173324.56-332319.8

Liller 1 is a stellar system in the constellation Scorpius, discovered by the American astronomer William Liller in 1977. In 2026, it was the second object to be reclassified from a globular cluster to a bulge fossil fragment. It is close to the centre of the Milky Way in its galactic bulge, only 2,600 light-years (800 pc) from the centre. Liller 1 is just under 30,000 light years from Earth.

== Properties ==
Liller 1 is located within the galactic bulge, and is heavily obscured by dust, being close to the galactic plane. Thus, studies of this object have mostly been conducted in wavelengths other than the optical range. The absorbing clouds of dust are not uniform, and the extinction coefficient R_{V} is 2.5, less than the typically assumed value of 3.1.

Liller 1 has a mass of around 2.3 million solar masses; this makes it one of the more massive globular clusters, along with others such as ω Centauri and Terzan 5. After Terzan 5, it has the highest rate of stellar collisions of any Milky Way globular cluster. It also has the highest level of emission of gamma rays of any globular cluster. This may be due to a large number of stellar collisions and pulsars, but it may also be an unrelated background gamma ray source.

Liller 1 and Terzan 5 are remarkably similar. Although globular clusters are typically metal-poor, both have a relatively high metallicity; the abundance of metals for Liller 1 is estimated to be half that of the Sun. In 2021, Liller 1 was found to have two different stellar populations, like Terzan 5. One is about 12 billion years old, but the other is relatively young, at 1 to 3 billion years. This suggests that it may not be a true globular cluster, but a class of star cluster that coalesced to form galactic bulges. These star clusters are known as "bulge fossil fragments".

The globular cluster contains the rapid burster called MXB 1730-335.

== See Also ==
- Terzan 5
