= William Liller =

American astronomer (1927–2021)

Minor planets discovered: 2
2449 Kenos	8 April 1978	MPC
3040 Kozai	23 January 1979	MPC

William Liller (April 1, 1927 – February 28, 2021) was an American astronomer, known for his research on "planetary nebulae, comets, asteroids, magnetic activity in cool stars, the optical identification of X-ray sources, and astro-archaeology."

== Biography ==
He matriculated in 1944 at Harvard College, where he graduated in 1949 with a bachelor's degree in astronomy, after an 11-month interruption for service in the U.S. Navy from July 1945 to June 1946. He received in 1953 his Ph.D. in astronomy from the University of Michigan. His Ph.D. thesis, supervised by Lawrence H. Aller, dealt with the central stars and expansion rates of planetary nebulae. From 1953 to 1960 Liller was a junior faculty member at the University of Michigan. At Harvard University, he became in 1960 a full professor and in 1962 was appointed Robert Wheeler Willson Professor of Applied Astronomy. He discovered two minor planets, several novae, the globular star cluster Liller 1 in Scorpius, and comet C/1988 A1 (Liller).

He was an author of several popular books on the subject of astronomy, a member of the International Astronomical Union, the American Astronomical Society, the American Academy of Arts and Sciences and AAVSO. He was also awarded the Guggenheim Fellowship for Natural Sciences. The minor planet 3222 Liller was named in his honor. In 1991 a festschrift was published in his honor.

In 1981 Liller resigned from Harvard University and became the associate director of the Instituto Isaac Newton with main office in the eastern outskirts of Santiago Chile. He maintained a small but well-equipped observatory in Viña del Mar about 120 kilometers west of Santiago. In 1986 NASA funded Liller's three-month stay on Easter Island, where he set up a small observatory to observe Halley's Comet. During this time he became fascinated with the island's many ancient temples and eventually began a program of archaeoastronomy. He and his Chilean third wife lived in Reñaca, Chile in a villa on high cliffs overlooking the Pacific Ocean. He was a vice-president of the Easter Island Foundation and an expert on the ancient culture of Rapanui.

His doctoral students include Christine Jones Forman and Debra Elmegreen.

== Selected publications ==
=== Articles ===
- Gottlieb, E. W.; Wright, E. L.; Liller, W. (1975). "Optical studies of UHURU sources. XI. A probable period for Scorpius X-1 = V818 Sco". The Astrophysical Journal. 195: L33. doi:10.1086/181703.
- Liller, W. (1977). "Searches for the optical counterparts of the X-ray burst sources MXB 1728-34 and MXB 1730-33". The Astrophysical Journal. 213: L21. Bibcode:1977ApJ...213L..21L. doi:10.1086/182401.
- Bond, H. E.; Liller, W.; Mannery, E. J. (1978). "UU Sagittae - Eclipsing nucleus of the planetary nebula Abell 63". The Astrophysical Journal. 223: 252. Bibcode:1978ApJ...223..252B. doi:10.1086/156257.
- Giacconi, R.; Bechtold, J.; Branduardi, G.; Forman, W.; Henry, J. P.; Jones, C.; Kellogg, E.; Van Der Laan, H.; Liller, W.; Marshall, H.; Murray, S. S.; Pye, J.; Schreier, E.; Sargent, W. L. W.; Seward, F.; Tananbaum, H. (1979). "A high-sensitivity X-ray survey using the Einstein Observatory and the discrete source contribution to the extragalactic X-ray background". The Astrophysical Journal. 234: L1. Bibcode:1979ApJ...234L...1G. doi:10.1086/183099. hdl:1887/6390.
- Forman, W.; Schwarz, J.; Jones, C.; Liller, W.; Fabian, A. C. (1979). "X-ray observations of galaxies in the Virgo cluster". The Astrophysical Journal. 234: L27–L31. Bibcode:1979ApJ...234L..27F. doi:10.1086/183103.
- Kowal, C. T.; Liller, W.; Marsden, B. G. (1979). "The Discovery and Orbit of (2060) Chiron". Symposium - International Astronomical Union. 81: 245–250. doi:10.1017/S007418090001281X. S2CID 122886147.
- Kahler, S.; et al. (1982). "Coordinated X-ray, optical, and radio observations of flaring activity on YZ Canis Minoris". The Astrophysical Journal. 252: 239. Bibcode:1982ApJ...252..239K. doi:10.1086/159551.
- Liller, William (1989). "The Archaeoastronomy of Easter Island". Revista Mexicana de Astronomía y Astrofísica. 19: 47–53. Bibcode:1989RMxAA..19...47L.
- Schaefer, Bradley E.; Liller, William (1990). "Refraction near the horizon". Publications of the Astronomical Society of the Pacific. 102: 796. Bibcode:1990PASP..102..796S. doi:10.1086/132705. S2CID 119464061.

=== Books and booklets ===
- Liller, William; Mayer, Ben (23 August 1990). Cambridge Astronomy Guide. CUP Archive. ISBN 9780521399159.
- Liller, William (30 October 1992). The Cambridge Guide to Astronomical Discovery. Cambridge University Press. ISBN 9780521418393.
- Liller, William (1993). The Ancient Solar Observatories of Rapanui: The Archaeoastronomy of Easter Island. Cloud Mountain Press. ISBN 9781880636015.
- Rapahango, Ana Betty Haoa; Liller, William (1996). Speak Rapanui! : the language of Easter Island = ¡Hable rapanui! : la lengua de Isla de Pascua. Los Osos, California: Easter Island Foundation. ISBN 9781880636039; 133 pages : illustrations, map; 14 x 22 cm.; trilingual language-phrase booklet
