= Palomar 12 =

Globular cluster in the constellation Capricornus

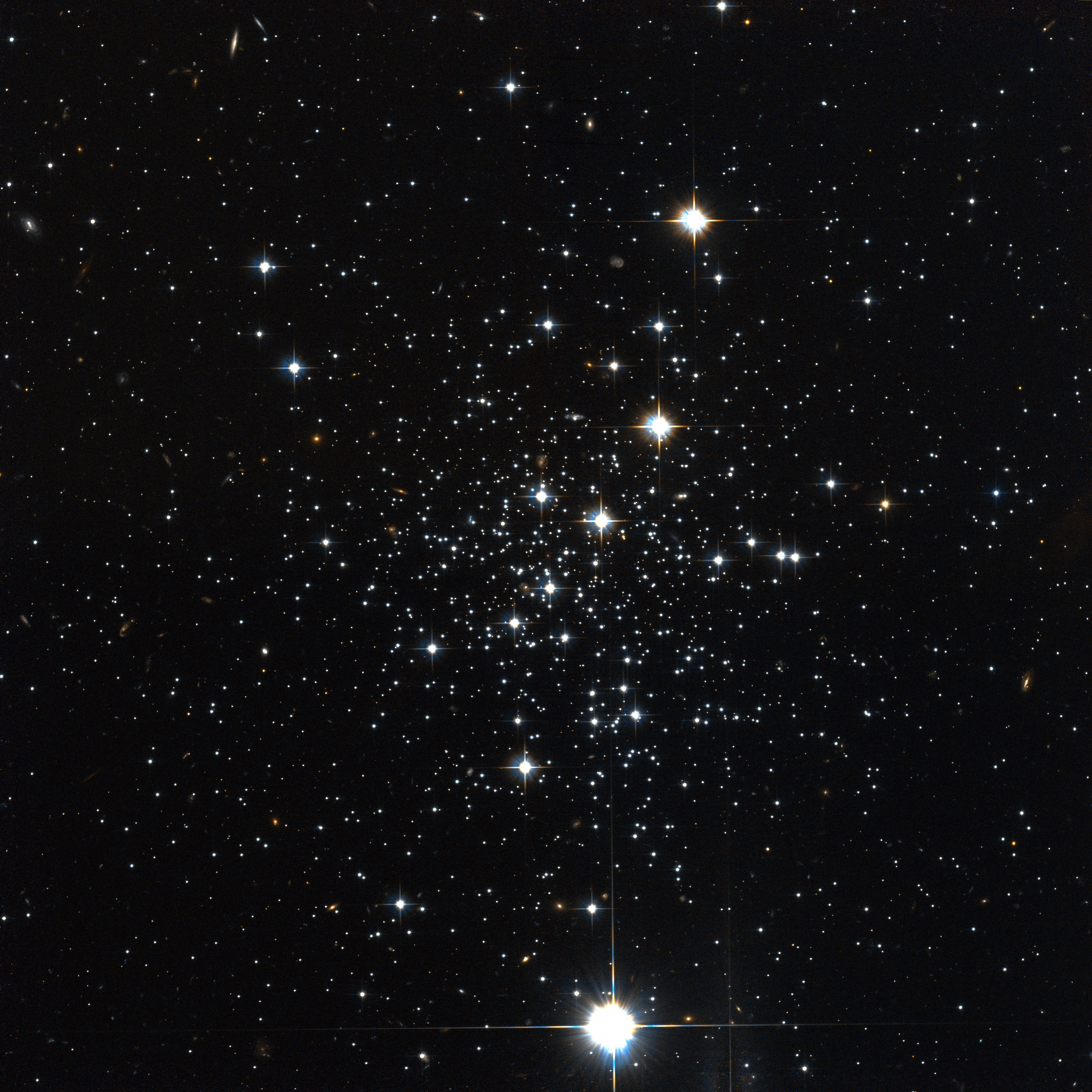
- Palomar 12 by Hubble Space Telescope, 3.36′ view

Observation data (J2000 epoch)
- Class: XII
- Constellation: Capricornus
- Right ascension: 21^{h} 46^{m} 38.84^{s}
- Declination: –21° 15′ 09.4″
- Distance: 63.6 ± 2.9 kly (19.50 ± 0.89 kpc)
- Apparent magnitude (V): 11.99
- Apparent dimensions (V): 17.4′

Physical characteristics
- Mass: 1.59×10^{4} M_{☉}
- Radius: 162 ± 8 ly
- Metallicity: [Fe/H] = –0.85 dex
- Estimated age: 6.5 Gyr
- Notable features: Probably extragalactic
- Other designations: GCl 123

Palomar 12 is a globular cluster in the constellation Capricornus, and is a member of the Palomar Globular Clusters group.

First discovered on the National Geographic Society – Palomar Observatory Sky Survey plates by Robert George Harrington and Fritz Zwicky, it was initially catalogued as a globular cluster; however, Zwicky came to believe it was actually a nearby dwarf galaxy in the Local Group. It is a relatively young cluster, being about 30% younger than most of the globular clusters in the Milky Way. It is metal-rich with a metallicity of [Fe/H] ≈ −0.8. It has an average luminosity distribution of M_{v} = −4.48.

Based on proper motion studies, this cluster was first suspected in 2000 to have been captured from the Sagittarius Dwarf Elliptical Galaxy (SagDEG) about 1.7 Ga ago. It is now generally believed to have originated in that galaxy and is associated with the Sagittarius Stream. It is estimated to be 6.5 Gyr old.

== See also ==
- Messier 54
