= C/1996 Q1 (Tabur) =

Non-periodic comet

Discovery
- Discovered by: Vello Tabur
- Discovery site: Wanniassa, Australia
- Discovery date: 19 August 1996

Orbital characteristics
- Epoch: 15 September 1996 (JD 2450341.5)
- Observation arc: 58 days
- Number of observations: 214
- Semi-major axis: 605.019 AU
- Eccentricity: 0.99861
- Orbital period: ~14,900 years
- Inclination: 73.356°
- Longitude of ascending node: 31.400°
- Argument of periapsis: 57.413°
- Last perihelion: 3 November 1996
- T_{Jupiter}: 0.334
- Earth MOID: 0.0838 AU
- Jupiter MOID: 1.0053 AU

Physical characteristics
- Mean radius: < 350 m (1,150 ft)
- Comet total magnitude (M1): 11.0
- Comet nuclear magnitude (M2): 16.4
- Apparent magnitude: 4.8 (1996 apparition)

C/1996 Q1 (Tabur) is a non-periodic comet that became visible to the naked eye in October 1996. It is the first of three comets discovered by Australian astronomer, Vello Tabur. (Note: Vello Tabur later discovered the following comets; C/1997 N1 (Tabur) and C/2003 T3 (Tabur))

== Discovery and observations ==
The comet was first spotted by Vello Tabur from his 0.2 m (7.9 in) reflector as a 10th-magnitude object within the constellation Eridanus on the evening of 19 August 1996. At the time, astronomers had difficulty confirming the new comet's existence until Herman Mikuž and Alan Hale independently spotted it on 21 August.

The comet steadily brightened as it approached the Earth throughout the entire month of September, and was "widely noted as a naked eye object in the first half of October. It faded rapidly from mid-October despite the fact that it was still approaching perihelion. It was theorized that the comet's sudden decline in brightness were likely caused by the depletion of volatiles within its nucleus.

The comet was last seen as a 9th-magnitude object on 23 November 1996.

== Orbit ==
Shortly after discovery, Brian G. Marsden computed the first parabolic orbit of the comet on 23 August 1996, which was roughly 73 degrees inclined to the ecliptic and an orbital period of approximately 18,500 years. A revised orbit was published about a week later, and Jost Jahn noted it has a strong resemblance to the orbit of C/1988 A1 (Liller), suggesting they might have fragmented from each other in a previous perihelion, despite the latter's shorter orbital period of 2,900 years. in the following years, more fragments of the same comet family were found. These were C/2015 F3 (SWAN), C/2019 Y4 (ATLAS) and C/2023 V5 (Leonard).
