= Palomar 1 =

Globular cluster in the constellation Cepheus

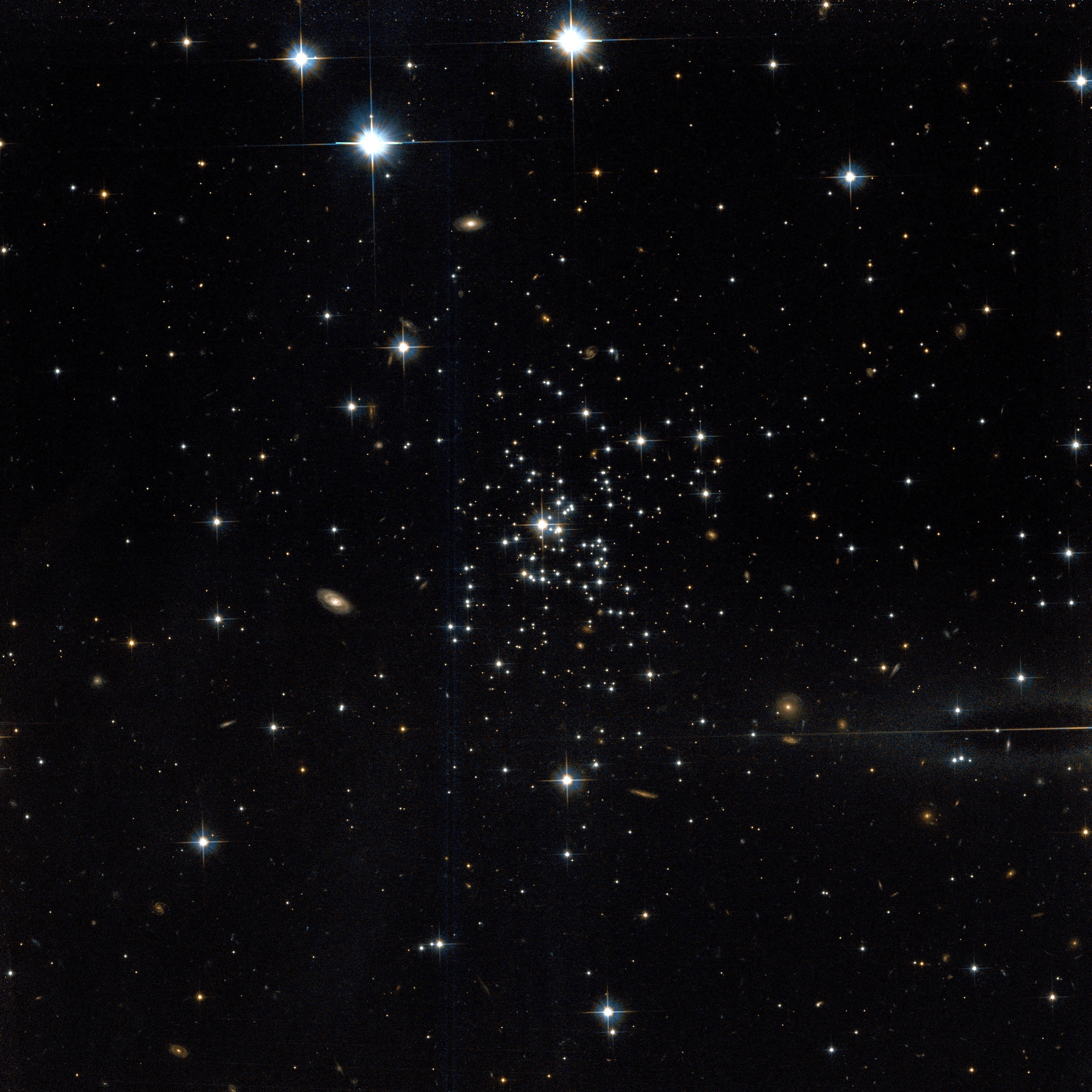
- Palomar 1 by Hubble Space Telescope; 3.3′ view

Observation data (J2000 epoch)
- Class: XII
- Constellation: Cepheus
- Right ascension: 03^{h} 33^{m} 20.04^{s}
- Declination: +79° 34′ 51.8″
- Distance: 36.5 ± 4.2 kly (11,200 ± 1,300 pc)
- Apparent magnitude (V): +13.18
- Apparent dimensions (V): 2.8′

Physical characteristics
- Radius: 15 ly
- Estimated age: 6.3 to 8 Gyr
- Notable features: –
- Other designations: LEDA 13165

Palomar 1 is a globular cluster, part of the Palomar group in the constellation Cepheus in the halo possibly in the Outer Arm of the Milky Way galaxy. First discovered by George O. Abell in 1954 on the Palomar Survey Sky plates, it was catalogued as a globular cluster.

At 6.3 to 8 Gyr, it is a very young cluster when compared to the other globular clusters in the Milky Way. It is a relatively metal-poor globular with [Fe/H] = −0.60. It is likely that Palomar 1 has a similar evolutionary history to the Sagittarius dwarf companion globular Terzan 7, that is, it may have once been associated with a dwarf spheroidal galaxy that was later destroyed by tidal forces.
