= Agop Terzan =

Turkish-Armenian astronomer (1927–2020)

Agop Terzan (born Terziyan) (October 31, 1927 – April 4, 2020) was a Turkish-French astronomer of Armenian descent. Known for his work on globular clusters, he is the author of the Terzan Catalogue. Terzan spent most of his life in Lyon, France.

== Career and education ==
Born in Istanbul, he finished his high school from Getronagan Armenian High School, after he received his bachelor's degree in mathematical and astronomical science in 1945 and master's degree in astronomy in 1949 from Istanbul University, where he worked as a teacher of mathematics at the Central Lyceum of Istanbul. In 1965, he was awarded a doctorate of mathematical sciences by the University of Lyon, where he studied under Jean Dufay. In 1980, he was awarded a professorship from the University of Lyon.

== Career ==
He discovered 710 variable stars during the 1960s and 11 globular clusters, including Terzan 5 and Terzan 7 (both discovered in 1968). Subsequently, he discovered 4430 new variable stars. Terzan also discovered 158 diffuse nebulae, 124 galaxies, and 1428 high proper motion stars.

== Professional memberships ==
He was a member of the French National Astronomy Committee and the International Astronomical Union (IAU).

== Awards and distinctions ==
- 1977: Henry-Rey Prize from the Société astronomique de France
- 1988: Corona Prize from the French Academy of Sciences
- 2014: Anania Shirakatsi Medal
- Ordre national du Mérite
- Asteroid 265380 Terzan is named in his honor

== See also ==
- Terzan Catalogue
