= Messier 54 =

Globular cluster in Sagittarius

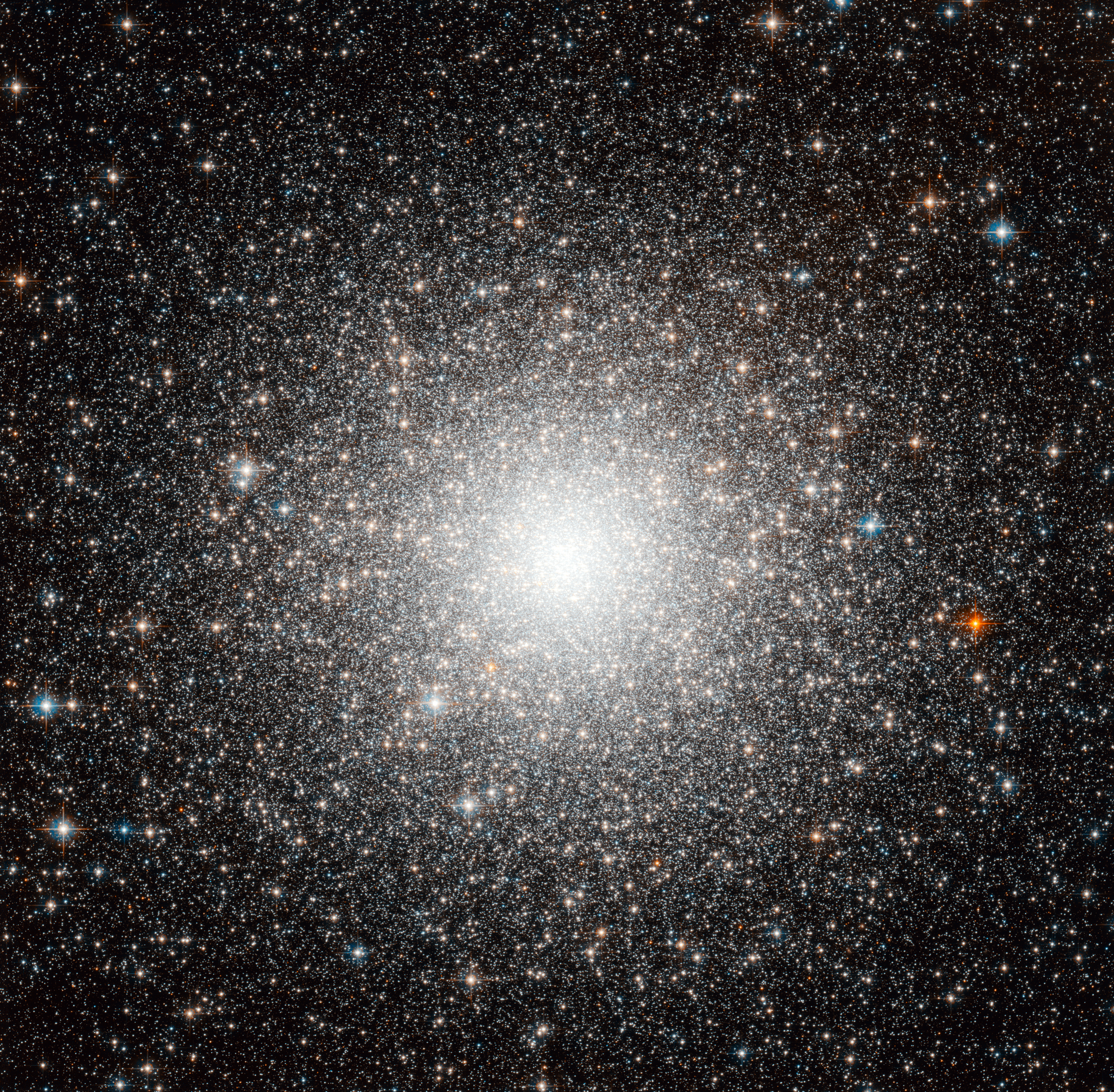
- M54 by Hubble Space Telescope; 3.4′ view

Observation data (J2000 epoch)
- Class: III
- Constellation: Sagittarius
- Right ascension: 18^{h} 55^{m} 03.33^{s}
- Declination: −30° 28′ 47.5″
- Distance: 24.452+0.537 −0.602 kpc (79.75+1.75 −1.96 kly)
- Apparent magnitude (V): 7.6

Physical characteristics
- Estimated age: 13 Gyr
- Notable features: Probably extragalactic
- Other designations: M54, NGC 6715, GCl 104, C 1851-305

Messier 54 (also known as M54 or NGC 6715) is a globular cluster in the constellation Sagittarius. It was discovered by Charles Messier in 1778 and then included in his catalog of objects that could be mistaken for comets.

It is easily found in the sky, being close to the star ζ Sagittarii. It is, however, not resolvable into individual stars even with larger amateur telescopes.

In July 2009, a team of astronomers reported that they had found evidence of an intermediate-mass black hole in the core of M54.

== Distance ==
Previously thought to belong to the Milky Way at a distance from Earth of about 50,000 light-years, it was discovered in 1994 that M54 most likely belongs to the Sagittarius Dwarf Elliptical Galaxy (SagDEG), making it the first globular cluster formerly thought to be part of our galaxy reassigned to extragalactic status, even if not recognized as such for more than two centuries. As it is located in SagDEG's center, some authors think it actually may be its core; however others have proposed that it is a real globular cluster that fell to the center of this galaxy due to decay of its orbit caused by dynamical friction.

Modern estimates now place M54 at a distance of some 79,750 light-years. It is one of the denser of the globulars, being of class III (I being densest and XII being the least dense). It shines with the luminosity of roughly 850,000 times that of the Sun and has an absolute magnitude of −10.0.

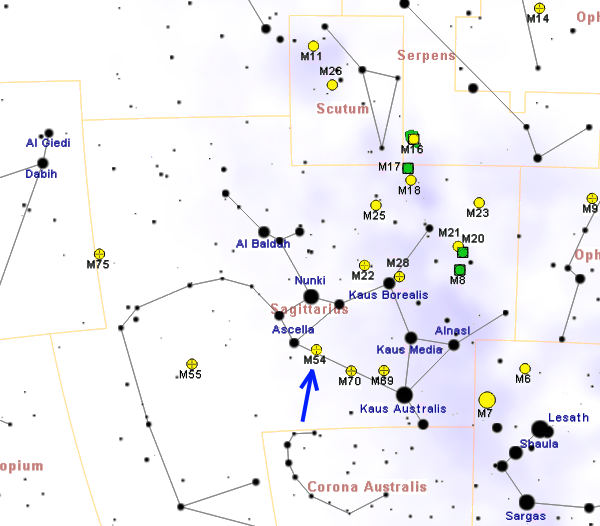
Map showing location of M54

== See also ==
- List of Messier objects
- Omega Centauri
- Mayall II
- Palomar 12
