= List of minor planets: 871001–872000 =

The following is a partial list of minor planets, running from minor-planet number 871001 through 872000, inclusive. The primary data for this and other partial lists is based on JPL's "Small-Body Orbital Elements" and data available from the Minor Planet Center. Critical list information is also provided by the MPC, unless otherwise specified from Lowell Observatory. A detailed description of the table's columns and additional sources are given on the main page including a complete list of every page in this series, and a statistical break-up on the dynamical classification of minor planets.

Also see the summary list of all named bodies in numerical and alphabetical order, and the corresponding naming citations for the number range of this particular list. New namings may only be added to this list after official publication, as the preannouncement of names is condemned by the Working Group for Small Bodies Nomenclature of the International Astronomical Union.

Near-Earth obj.	MBA (inner)	MBA (outer)	Centaur
Mars-crosser	MBA (middle)	Jupiter trojan	Trans-Neptunian obj.
Unclassified

== 871001–871100 ==
Designation			Discovery			Properties		Ref
Permanent	Provisional	Named after	Date	Site	Discoverer(s)	Category	Diam.	Ref
871001	2017 FC_{235}	—	March 19, 2017	Haleakala	Pan-STARRS 1	PHO	670 m	MPC · JPL
871002	2017 FZ_{236}	—	March 29, 2017	Mauna Kea	COIAS	·	1.3 km	MPC · JPL
871003	2017 FE_{252}	—	March 29, 2012	Mount Lemmon	Mount Lemmon Survey	·	1.5 km	MPC · JPL
871004	2017 GX	—	November 20, 2006	Kitt Peak	Spacewatch	(18466)	1.5 km	MPC · JPL
871005	2017 GW_{1}	—	September 2, 2014	Haleakala	Pan-STARRS 1	·	2.1 km	MPC · JPL
871006	2017 GK_{3}	—	May 8, 2013	Haleakala	Pan-STARRS 1	·	990 m	MPC · JPL
871007	2017 GN_{12}	—	April 3, 2017	Haleakala	Pan-STARRS 1	·	850 m	MPC · JPL
871008	2017 GW_{12}	—	October 31, 2005	Mauna Kea	A. Boattini	·	870 m	MPC · JPL
871009	2017 GF_{13}	—	April 6, 2017	Mount Lemmon	Mount Lemmon Survey	T_{j} (2.83)	4.3 km	MPC · JPL
871010	2017 GW_{13}	—	April 1, 2017	Haleakala	Pan-STARRS 1	·	980 m	MPC · JPL
871011	2017 GC_{16}	—	April 3, 2017	Haleakala	Pan-STARRS 1	·	1.2 km	MPC · JPL
871012	2017 GB_{17}	—	April 1, 2017	Haleakala	Pan-STARRS 1	·	670 m	MPC · JPL
871013	2017 GO_{17}	—	April 2, 2017	Haleakala	Pan-STARRS 1	·	560 m	MPC · JPL
871014	2017 GT_{21}	—	April 3, 2017	Haleakala	Pan-STARRS 1	·	440 m	MPC · JPL
871015	2017 GT_{22}	—	April 5, 2017	Mount Lemmon	Mount Lemmon Survey	PHO	910 m	MPC · JPL
871016	2017 GX_{23}	—	April 3, 2017	Mount Lemmon	Mount Lemmon Survey	VER	1.9 km	MPC · JPL
871017	2017 GF_{24}	—	April 3, 2017	Haleakala	Pan-STARRS 1	·	840 m	MPC · JPL
871018	2017 GW_{24}	—	July 8, 2014	Haleakala	Pan-STARRS 1	V	370 m	MPC · JPL
871019	2017 GA_{27}	—	April 3, 2017	Mount Lemmon	Mount Lemmon Survey	·	2.2 km	MPC · JPL
871020	2017 GD_{27}	—	April 6, 2017	Mount Lemmon	Mount Lemmon Survey	H	380 m	MPC · JPL
871021	2017 GE_{27}	—	April 1, 2017	Haleakala	Pan-STARRS 1	·	2.3 km	MPC · JPL
871022	2017 GU_{30}	—	January 25, 2006	Kitt Peak	Spacewatch	·	510 m	MPC · JPL
871023	2017 HM	—	March 7, 2017	Haleakala	Pan-STARRS 1	·	330 m	MPC · JPL
871024	2017 HK_{6}	—	July 2, 2014	Haleakala	Pan-STARRS 1	V	410 m	MPC · JPL
871025	2017 HC_{7}	—	April 13, 2013	Haleakala	Pan-STARRS 1	·	730 m	MPC · JPL
871026	2017 HE_{7}	—	May 8, 2013	Haleakala	Pan-STARRS 1	·	1.2 km	MPC · JPL
871027	2017 HO_{7}	—	August 3, 2014	Haleakala	Pan-STARRS 1	·	750 m	MPC · JPL
871028	2017 HZ_{8}	—	February 28, 2006	Mount Lemmon	Mount Lemmon Survey	·	1.7 km	MPC · JPL
871029	2017 HG_{9}	—	April 2, 2006	Kitt Peak	Spacewatch	ERI	990 m	MPC · JPL
871030	2017 HJ_{10}	—	December 3, 2005	Mauna Kea	A. Boattini	·	1.3 km	MPC · JPL
871031	2017 HN_{13}	—	April 28, 2004	Kitt Peak	Spacewatch	·	1.2 km	MPC · JPL
871032	2017 HD_{18}	—	April 1, 2017	Haleakala	Pan-STARRS 1	NYS	1.1 km	MPC · JPL
871033	2017 HO_{18}	—	April 2, 2006	Kitt Peak	Spacewatch	·	2.3 km	MPC · JPL
871034	2017 HA_{20}	—	September 29, 2009	Kitt Peak	Spacewatch	·	1.8 km	MPC · JPL
871035	2017 HJ_{20}	—	February 24, 2017	Haleakala	Pan-STARRS 1	·	1.4 km	MPC · JPL
871036	2017 HX_{20}	—	September 10, 2007	Mount Lemmon	Mount Lemmon Survey	T_{j} (2.97)	2.0 km	MPC · JPL
871037	2017 HZ_{20}	—	January 28, 2011	Mount Lemmon	Mount Lemmon Survey	·	1.9 km	MPC · JPL
871038	2017 HJ_{21}	—	February 21, 2017	Haleakala	Pan-STARRS 1	·	590 m	MPC · JPL
871039	2017 HK_{24}	—	April 20, 2017	Haleakala	Pan-STARRS 1	·	860 m	MPC · JPL
871040	2017 HF_{30}	—	October 28, 2014	Haleakala	Pan-STARRS 1	·	890 m	MPC · JPL
871041	2017 HM_{32}	—	March 13, 2013	Mount Lemmon	Mount Lemmon Survey	·	870 m	MPC · JPL
871042	2017 HN_{33}	—	April 26, 2017	Haleakala	Pan-STARRS 1	H	330 m	MPC · JPL
871043	2017 HS_{33}	—	March 8, 2013	Haleakala	Pan-STARRS 1	NYS	800 m	MPC · JPL
871044	2017 HX_{34}	—	September 14, 2014	Haleakala	Pan-STARRS 1	·	620 m	MPC · JPL
871045	2017 HF_{36}	—	April 19, 2017	Mount Lemmon	Mount Lemmon Survey	·	1.7 km	MPC · JPL
871046	2017 HG_{36}	—	November 24, 2009	Kitt Peak	Spacewatch	·	1.8 km	MPC · JPL
871047	2017 HY_{37}	—	September 20, 2014	Haleakala	Pan-STARRS 1	·	760 m	MPC · JPL
871048	2017 HD_{38}	—	September 24, 2011	Mount Lemmon	Mount Lemmon Survey	·	500 m	MPC · JPL
871049	2017 HD_{39}	—	June 12, 2013	Haleakala	Pan-STARRS 1	·	870 m	MPC · JPL
871050	2017 HU_{39}	—	November 17, 2011	Mount Lemmon	Mount Lemmon Survey	·	730 m	MPC · JPL
871051	2017 HF_{41}	—	September 2, 2014	Haleakala	Pan-STARRS 1	MAS	550 m	MPC · JPL
871052	2017 HL_{41}	—	May 6, 2006	Mount Lemmon	Mount Lemmon Survey	·	2.0 km	MPC · JPL
871053	2017 HH_{47}	—	August 28, 2014	Haleakala	Pan-STARRS 1	V	480 m	MPC · JPL
871054	2017 HT_{60}	—	April 25, 2007	Kitt Peak	Spacewatch	·	1.5 km	MPC · JPL
871055	2017 HZ_{64}	—	May 15, 2004	Kitt Peak	Spacewatch	H	450 m	MPC · JPL
871056	2017 HG_{67}	—	April 25, 2017	Haleakala	Pan-STARRS 1	T_{j} (2.99) · EUP	2.8 km	MPC · JPL
871057	2017 HF_{69}	—	April 20, 2017	Haleakala	Pan-STARRS 1	·	720 m	MPC · JPL
871058	2017 HJ_{69}	—	April 16, 2017	Mount Lemmon	Mount Lemmon Survey	·	560 m	MPC · JPL
871059	2017 HG_{71}	—	April 20, 2017	Haleakala	Pan-STARRS 1	·	1.0 km	MPC · JPL
871060	2017 HA_{72}	—	April 28, 2017	Haleakala	Pan-STARRS 1	·	1.8 km	MPC · JPL
871061	2017 HB_{72}	—	April 22, 2017	Mount Lemmon	Mount Lemmon Survey	TIR	2.3 km	MPC · JPL
871062	2017 HH_{72}	—	April 25, 2017	Haleakala	Pan-STARRS 1	·	2.6 km	MPC · JPL
871063	2017 HC_{73}	—	April 26, 2017	Haleakala	Pan-STARRS 1	H	240 m	MPC · JPL
871064	2017 HK_{75}	—	April 16, 2017	Cerro Paranal	Gaia Ground Based Optical Tracking	·	1.2 km	MPC · JPL
871065	2017 HG_{78}	—	April 26, 2017	Haleakala	Pan-STARRS 1	·	1.2 km	MPC · JPL
871066	2017 HF_{80}	—	April 26, 2017	Haleakala	Pan-STARRS 1	MAR	680 m	MPC · JPL
871067	2017 HG_{80}	—	April 26, 2017	Haleakala	Pan-STARRS 1	·	820 m	MPC · JPL
871068	2017 HN_{80}	—	April 27, 2017	Haleakala	Pan-STARRS 1	·	940 m	MPC · JPL
871069	2017 HF_{84}	—	November 30, 2011	Mount Lemmon	Mount Lemmon Survey	·	690 m	MPC · JPL
871070	2017 HR_{84}	—	April 25, 2017	Haleakala	Pan-STARRS 1	·	800 m	MPC · JPL
871071	2017 HP_{87}	—	April 25, 2017	Haleakala	Pan-STARRS 1	·	450 m	MPC · JPL
871072	2017 HS_{87}	—	July 1, 2014	Haleakala	Pan-STARRS 1	·	480 m	MPC · JPL
871073	2017 HY_{90}	—	April 28, 2017	Haleakala	Pan-STARRS 1	·	2.1 km	MPC · JPL
871074	2017 HU_{94}	—	April 26, 2017	Haleakala	Pan-STARRS 1	·	1.4 km	MPC · JPL
871075	2017 HV_{94}	—	April 27, 2017	Haleakala	Pan-STARRS 1	·	2.0 km	MPC · JPL
871076	2017 HS_{100}	—	April 27, 2017	Haleakala	Pan-STARRS 1	·	2.0 km	MPC · JPL
871077	2017 HG_{101}	—	May 11, 2013	Mount Lemmon	Mount Lemmon Survey	·	860 m	MPC · JPL
871078	2017 HW_{105}	—	March 5, 2013	Haleakala	Pan-STARRS 1	·	800 m	MPC · JPL
871079	2017 HR_{115}	—	April 26, 2017	Mauna Kea	COIAS	·	990 m	MPC · JPL
871080	2017 JT_{4}	—	April 27, 2008	Kitt Peak	Spacewatch	·	1.5 km	MPC · JPL
871081	2017 JB_{5}	—	February 25, 2011	Mount Lemmon	Mount Lemmon Survey	·	2.2 km	MPC · JPL
871082	2017 JC_{7}	—	May 6, 2017	Haleakala	Pan-STARRS 1	·	1.0 km	MPC · JPL
871083	2017 JN_{7}	—	May 4, 2017	Haleakala	Pan-STARRS 1	·	2.1 km	MPC · JPL
871084	2017 JZ_{7}	—	May 1, 2017	Mount Lemmon	Mount Lemmon Survey	V	390 m	MPC · JPL
871085	2017 KW	—	May 1, 2003	Kitt Peak	Spacewatch	·	1.4 km	MPC · JPL
871086	2017 KX	—	July 25, 2014	Haleakala	Pan-STARRS 1	·	540 m	MPC · JPL
871087	2017 KM_{5}	—	December 28, 2011	Socorro	LINEAR	·	520 m	MPC · JPL
871088	2017 KM_{6}	—	April 19, 2017	Mount Lemmon	Mount Lemmon Survey	·	550 m	MPC · JPL
871089	2017 KV_{7}	—	August 28, 2014	Haleakala	Pan-STARRS 1	·	730 m	MPC · JPL
871090	2017 KY_{7}	—	June 10, 2010	Mount Lemmon	Mount Lemmon Survey	·	920 m	MPC · JPL
871091	2017 KX_{8}	—	May 11, 2010	Mount Lemmon	Mount Lemmon Survey	·	480 m	MPC · JPL
871092	2017 KE_{12}	—	April 1, 2017	Haleakala	Pan-STARRS 1	·	750 m	MPC · JPL
871093	2017 KZ_{13}	—	January 29, 2016	Mount Lemmon	Mount Lemmon Survey	EOS	1.3 km	MPC · JPL
871094	2017 KK_{18}	—	August 31, 2005	Kitt Peak	Spacewatch	(5)	1.0 km	MPC · JPL
871095	2017 KS_{18}	—	August 9, 2007	Socorro	LINEAR	·	570 m	MPC · JPL
871096	2017 KA_{23}	—	December 12, 2015	Haleakala	Pan-STARRS 1	·	1.9 km	MPC · JPL
871097	2017 KU_{26}	—	April 13, 2013	Haleakala	Pan-STARRS 1	·	870 m	MPC · JPL
871098	2017 KU_{28}	—	September 15, 2007	Lulin	LUSS	·	460 m	MPC · JPL
871099	2017 KC_{29}	—	March 14, 2013	Catalina	CSS	PHO	740 m	MPC · JPL
871100	2017 KH_{30}	—	May 7, 2010	Kitt Peak	Spacewatch	(2076)	570 m	MPC · JPL

== 871101–871200 ==
back to top

Designation			Discovery			Properties		Ref
Permanent	Provisional	Named after	Date	Site	Discoverer(s)	Category	Diam.	Ref
871101	2017 KO_{30}	—	August 31, 2014	Haleakala	Pan-STARRS 1	·	650 m	MPC · JPL
871102	2017 KU_{32}	—	May 19, 2017	Mount Lemmon	Mount Lemmon Survey	·	680 m	MPC · JPL
871103	2017 KB_{33}	—	April 22, 2017	Mount Lemmon	Mount Lemmon Survey	H	400 m	MPC · JPL
871104	2017 KW_{33}	—	April 25, 2017	Haleakala	Pan-STARRS 1	·	2.2 km	MPC · JPL
871105	2017 KY_{35}	—	May 26, 2017	ESA OGS	ESA OGS	MAS	540 m	MPC · JPL
871106	2017 KX_{36}	—	May 19, 2017	Haleakala	Pan-STARRS 1	·	1.6 km	MPC · JPL
871107	2017 KM_{37}	—	April 25, 2017	Haleakala	Pan-STARRS 1	·	870 m	MPC · JPL
871108	2017 KT_{37}	—	September 16, 2006	Catalina	CSS	·	2.1 km	MPC · JPL
871109	2017 KW_{37}	—	May 19, 2017	Haleakala	Pan-STARRS 1	·	980 m	MPC · JPL
871110	2017 KY_{37}	—	May 27, 2017	Haleakala	Pan-STARRS 1	·	750 m	MPC · JPL
871111	2017 KX_{38}	—	September 30, 2010	Mount Lemmon	Mount Lemmon Survey	·	810 m	MPC · JPL
871112	2017 KG_{39}	—	May 31, 2017	Haleakala	Pan-STARRS 1	H	400 m	MPC · JPL
871113	2017 KK_{40}	—	May 28, 2017	Oukaïmeden	M. Ory	·	1.9 km	MPC · JPL
871114	2017 KF_{42}	—	May 30, 2017	Haleakala	Pan-STARRS 1	H	410 m	MPC · JPL
871115	2017 KG_{43}	—	May 24, 2017	Mount Lemmon	Mount Lemmon Survey	NYS	840 m	MPC · JPL
871116	2017 KM_{43}	—	May 27, 2017	Haleakala	Pan-STARRS 1	·	730 m	MPC · JPL
871117	2017 KD_{44}	—	May 21, 2017	Haleakala	Pan-STARRS 1	NYS	880 m	MPC · JPL
871118	2017 KH_{46}	—	May 29, 2017	Mount Lemmon	Mount Lemmon Survey	·	3.4 km	MPC · JPL
871119	2017 KQ_{47}	—	May 17, 2017	Haleakala	Pan-STARRS 1	·	1.5 km	MPC · JPL
871120	2017 KQ_{49}	—	May 18, 2017	Haleakala	Pan-STARRS 1	·	950 m	MPC · JPL
871121	2017 KS_{52}	—	May 19, 2017	Haleakala	Pan-STARRS 1	·	830 m	MPC · JPL
871122	2017 LK	—	June 3, 2017	Haleakala	Pan-STARRS 1	·	490 m	MPC · JPL
871123	2017 LT_{2}	—	June 14, 2017	Mount Lemmon	Mount Lemmon Survey	H	330 m	MPC · JPL
871124	2017 LM_{3}	—	June 13, 2017	Mount Lemmon	Mount Lemmon Survey	·	900 m	MPC · JPL
871125	2017 MN	—	June 26, 2003	Kitt Peak	Spacewatch	·	560 m	MPC · JPL
871126	2017 MJ_{5}	—	June 24, 1995	Kitt Peak	Spacewatch	·	1.4 km	MPC · JPL
871127	2017 MB_{6}	—	March 13, 2013	Haleakala	Pan-STARRS 1	(2076)	610 m	MPC · JPL
871128	2017 ML_{6}	—	June 24, 2017	Haleakala	Pan-STARRS 1	·	740 m	MPC · JPL
871129	2017 MZ_{9}	—	June 24, 2017	Haleakala	Pan-STARRS 1	·	1.4 km	MPC · JPL
871130	2017 MF_{10}	—	August 23, 2003	Palomar	NEAT	·	1.4 km	MPC · JPL
871131	2017 MP_{10}	—	June 24, 2017	Haleakala	Pan-STARRS 1	·	610 m	MPC · JPL
871132	2017 MV_{10}	—	June 29, 2017	Mount Lemmon	Mount Lemmon Survey	·	880 m	MPC · JPL
871133	2017 MX_{11}	—	June 25, 2017	Haleakala	Pan-STARRS 1	·	880 m	MPC · JPL
871134	2017 MK_{12}	—	June 30, 2017	Mount Lemmon	Mount Lemmon Survey	·	2.0 km	MPC · JPL
871135	2017 MG_{13}	—	June 21, 2017	Haleakala	Pan-STARRS 1	MAR	740 m	MPC · JPL
871136	2017 MJ_{14}	—	September 30, 2010	Mount Lemmon	Mount Lemmon Survey	NYS	860 m	MPC · JPL
871137	2017 MP_{14}	—	June 24, 2017	Haleakala	Pan-STARRS 1	·	1.3 km	MPC · JPL
871138	2017 MR_{14}	—	June 21, 2017	Haleakala	Pan-STARRS 1	H	320 m	MPC · JPL
871139	2017 MK_{15}	—	June 24, 2017	Haleakala	Pan-STARRS 1	·	820 m	MPC · JPL
871140	2017 MN_{15}	—	June 22, 2017	Haleakala	Pan-STARRS 1	·	740 m	MPC · JPL
871141	2017 MH_{21}	—	June 24, 2017	Haleakala	Pan-STARRS 1	MAS	530 m	MPC · JPL
871142	2017 MA_{22}	—	December 1, 2010	Mount Lemmon	Mount Lemmon Survey	·	1.0 km	MPC · JPL
871143	2017 MD_{22}	—	June 21, 2017	Haleakala	Pan-STARRS 1	·	2.5 km	MPC · JPL
871144	2017 MU_{22}	—	June 30, 2017	Mount Lemmon	Mount Lemmon Survey	·	930 m	MPC · JPL
871145	2017 MD_{23}	—	June 21, 2017	Haleakala	Pan-STARRS 1	PHO	570 m	MPC · JPL
871146	2017 MP_{23}	—	June 21, 2017	Haleakala	Pan-STARRS 1	PHO	470 m	MPC · JPL
871147	2017 MU_{23}	—	June 25, 2017	Haleakala	Pan-STARRS 1	·	740 m	MPC · JPL
871148	2017 MO_{27}	—	June 25, 2017	Haleakala	Pan-STARRS 1	·	470 m	MPC · JPL
871149	2017 MA_{39}	—	May 28, 2009	Mount Lemmon	Mount Lemmon Survey	PHO	690 m	MPC · JPL
871150	2017 MH_{39}	—	June 25, 2017	Haleakala	Pan-STARRS 1	·	1.5 km	MPC · JPL
871151	2017 MG_{40}	—	May 1, 2006	Kitt Peak	Spacewatch	MAS	510 m	MPC · JPL
871152	2017 ND_{2}	—	June 13, 2007	Kitt Peak	Spacewatch	H	480 m	MPC · JPL
871153	2017 NW_{2}	—	July 5, 2017	Haleakala	Pan-STARRS 1	·	960 m	MPC · JPL
871154	2017 NY_{2}	—	June 29, 2017	Mount Lemmon	Mount Lemmon Survey	·	500 m	MPC · JPL
871155	2017 NN_{5}	—	February 15, 2013	Haleakala	Pan-STARRS 1	·	540 m	MPC · JPL
871156	2017 NY_{6}	—	July 15, 2017	Haleakala	Pan-STARRS 1	PHO	670 m	MPC · JPL
871157	2017 NW_{8}	—	July 1, 2017	Mount Lemmon	Mount Lemmon Survey	·	1.5 km	MPC · JPL
871158	2017 NQ_{10}	—	July 4, 2017	Haleakala	Pan-STARRS 1	·	1.3 km	MPC · JPL
871159	2017 NA_{13}	—	July 4, 2017	Haleakala	Pan-STARRS 1	·	500 m	MPC · JPL
871160	2017 NC_{13}	—	July 4, 2017	Haleakala	Pan-STARRS 1	·	580 m	MPC · JPL
871161	2017 ND_{13}	—	July 5, 2017	Haleakala	Pan-STARRS 1	NYS	960 m	MPC · JPL
871162	2017 NH_{13}	—	July 1, 2017	Haleakala	Pan-STARRS 1	·	1.0 km	MPC · JPL
871163	2017 NP_{13}	—	July 5, 2017	Haleakala	Pan-STARRS 1	·	1.2 km	MPC · JPL
871164	2017 NR_{14}	—	July 5, 2017	Haleakala	Pan-STARRS 1	·	900 m	MPC · JPL
871165	2017 NB_{16}	—	July 2, 2017	Mount Lemmon	Mount Lemmon Survey	·	1.7 km	MPC · JPL
871166	2017 NA_{19}	—	July 1, 2017	Haleakala	Pan-STARRS 1	NYS	830 m	MPC · JPL
871167	2017 NJ_{19}	—	July 1, 2017	Haleakala	Pan-STARRS 1	·	1.8 km	MPC · JPL
871168	2017 NK_{21}	—	July 5, 2017	Haleakala	Pan-STARRS 1	NYS	680 m	MPC · JPL
871169	2017 NN_{24}	—	July 1, 2017	Haleakala	Pan-STARRS 1	·	710 m	MPC · JPL
871170	2017 NC_{26}	—	January 10, 2006	Mount Lemmon	Mount Lemmon Survey	H	430 m	MPC · JPL
871171	2017 OW	—	July 25, 2006	Palomar	NEAT	·	2.1 km	MPC · JPL
871172	2017 OR_{3}	—	October 16, 2012	Mount Lemmon	Mount Lemmon Survey	·	1.4 km	MPC · JPL
871173	2017 OB_{4}	—	October 4, 2006	Mount Lemmon	Mount Lemmon Survey	MAS	550 m	MPC · JPL
871174	2017 OK_{7}	—	October 6, 2008	Mount Lemmon	Mount Lemmon Survey	·	1.3 km	MPC · JPL
871175	2017 OR_{10}	—	March 11, 2016	Haleakala	Pan-STARRS 1	·	1.9 km	MPC · JPL
871176	2017 OW_{13}	—	March 30, 2016	Cerro Tololo	DECam	SUL	1.3 km	MPC · JPL
871177	2017 OF_{15}	—	May 3, 2013	Haleakala	Pan-STARRS 1	·	840 m	MPC · JPL
871178	2017 OX_{15}	—	October 28, 2014	Haleakala	Pan-STARRS 1	·	570 m	MPC · JPL
871179	2017 OB_{17}	—	July 5, 2017	Haleakala	Pan-STARRS 1	H	370 m	MPC · JPL
871180	2017 OZ_{17}	—	February 8, 2016	Mount Lemmon	Mount Lemmon Survey	·	900 m	MPC · JPL
871181	2017 OR_{18}	—	July 27, 2017	Haleakala	Pan-STARRS 1	AMO	190 m	MPC · JPL
871182	2017 OB_{23}	—	July 26, 2017	Haleakala	Pan-STARRS 1	·	920 m	MPC · JPL
871183	2017 OD_{23}	—	December 30, 2007	Kitt Peak	Spacewatch	·	630 m	MPC · JPL
871184	2017 OJ_{25}	—	May 29, 2013	Mount Lemmon	Mount Lemmon Survey	·	860 m	MPC · JPL
871185	2017 OA_{26}	—	July 12, 2013	Haleakala	Pan-STARRS 1	PHO	700 m	MPC · JPL
871186	2017 OE_{26}	—	November 11, 2006	Kitt Peak	Spacewatch	·	920 m	MPC · JPL
871187	2017 ON_{26}	—	August 24, 2012	Kitt Peak	Spacewatch	TEL	860 m	MPC · JPL
871188	2017 OA_{28}	—	October 25, 2001	Sacramento Peak	SDSS	·	410 m	MPC · JPL
871189	2017 ON_{30}	—	July 26, 2017	Haleakala	Pan-STARRS 1	·	470 m	MPC · JPL
871190	2017 ON_{32}	—	December 26, 2014	Haleakala	Pan-STARRS 1	PHO	670 m	MPC · JPL
871191	2017 OP_{32}	—	December 29, 2014	Haleakala	Pan-STARRS 1	GAL	1.1 km	MPC · JPL
871192	2017 OX_{32}	—	July 26, 2017	Haleakala	Pan-STARRS 1	·	920 m	MPC · JPL
871193	2017 OW_{33}	—	September 5, 2008	Kitt Peak	Spacewatch	·	1 km	MPC · JPL
871194	2017 OB_{34}	—	October 2, 2006	Mount Lemmon	Mount Lemmon Survey	·	980 m	MPC · JPL
871195	2017 OY_{34}	—	July 26, 2017	Haleakala	Pan-STARRS 1	H	350 m	MPC · JPL
871196	2017 OZ_{35}	—	September 25, 2012	Mount Lemmon	Mount Lemmon Survey	EOS	1.3 km	MPC · JPL
871197	2017 OR_{39}	—	March 28, 2016	Cerro Tololo	DECam	·	720 m	MPC · JPL
871198	2017 OA_{41}	—	November 26, 2014	Haleakala	Pan-STARRS 1	V	490 m	MPC · JPL
871199	2017 OW_{46}	—	January 23, 2006	Mount Lemmon	Mount Lemmon Survey	·	1.2 km	MPC · JPL
871200	2017 OO_{50}	—	July 14, 2013	Haleakala	Pan-STARRS 1	PHO	610 m	MPC · JPL

== 871201–871300 ==
back to top

Designation			Discovery			Properties		Ref
Permanent	Provisional	Named after	Date	Site	Discoverer(s)	Category	Diam.	Ref
871201	2017 OG_{53}	—	October 28, 2014	Haleakala	Pan-STARRS 1	·	660 m	MPC · JPL
871202	2017 ON_{54}	—	January 20, 2015	Haleakala	Pan-STARRS 1	·	730 m	MPC · JPL
871203	2017 OL_{56}	—	October 8, 2012	Haleakala	Pan-STARRS 1	·	2.2 km	MPC · JPL
871204	2017 OY_{57}	—	June 7, 2013	Haleakala	Pan-STARRS 1	·	620 m	MPC · JPL
871205	2017 OS_{62}	—	August 18, 2006	Kitt Peak	Spacewatch	·	2.0 km	MPC · JPL
871206	2017 OJ_{65}	—	June 28, 2016	Haleakala	Pan-STARRS 1	T_{j} (2.97) · 3:2	4.3 km	MPC · JPL
871207	2017 OT_{65}	—	September 17, 2010	Mount Lemmon	Mount Lemmon Survey	·	720 m	MPC · JPL
871208	2017 OL_{71}	—	July 30, 2017	Haleakala	Pan-STARRS 1	·	900 m	MPC · JPL
871209	2017 OS_{71}	—	May 20, 2015	Cerro Tololo	DECam	3:2	3.9 km	MPC · JPL
871210	2017 OT_{71}	—	July 30, 2017	Haleakala	Pan-STARRS 1	·	1.4 km	MPC · JPL
871211	2017 OS_{73}	—	July 30, 2017	Haleakala	Pan-STARRS 1	EOS	1.3 km	MPC · JPL
871212	2017 OL_{74}	—	August 19, 2006	Kitt Peak	Spacewatch	·	900 m	MPC · JPL
871213	2017 OF_{78}	—	July 30, 2017	Haleakala	Pan-STARRS 1	NYS	700 m	MPC · JPL
871214	2017 OV_{81}	—	July 25, 2017	Haleakala	Pan-STARRS 1	·	1.9 km	MPC · JPL
871215	2017 OQ_{84}	—	July 30, 2017	Haleakala	Pan-STARRS 1	HYG	2.1 km	MPC · JPL
871216	2017 OR_{84}	—	July 25, 2017	Haleakala	Pan-STARRS 1	·	570 m	MPC · JPL
871217	2017 OJ_{85}	—	July 27, 2017	Haleakala	Pan-STARRS 1	·	1.0 km	MPC · JPL
871218	2017 OX_{85}	—	July 25, 2017	Haleakala	Pan-STARRS 1	H	330 m	MPC · JPL
871219	2017 OR_{88}	—	July 26, 2017	Haleakala	Pan-STARRS 1	·	1.4 km	MPC · JPL
871220	2017 OT_{89}	—	July 25, 2017	Haleakala	Pan-STARRS 1	·	510 m	MPC · JPL
871221	2017 OE_{92}	—	July 30, 2017	Haleakala	Pan-STARRS 1	·	820 m	MPC · JPL
871222	2017 ON_{92}	—	October 17, 2012	Mount Lemmon	Mount Lemmon Survey	·	2.1 km	MPC · JPL
871223	2017 OX_{95}	—	July 5, 2017	Haleakala	Pan-STARRS 1	·	590 m	MPC · JPL
871224	2017 OY_{95}	—	July 25, 2017	Haleakala	Pan-STARRS 1	·	610 m	MPC · JPL
871225	2017 OQ_{96}	—	March 5, 2016	Haleakala	Pan-STARRS 1	·	2.4 km	MPC · JPL
871226	2017 OX_{96}	—	July 26, 2017	Haleakala	Pan-STARRS 1	·	840 m	MPC · JPL
871227	2017 OF_{97}	—	July 26, 2017	Haleakala	Pan-STARRS 1	·	1.4 km	MPC · JPL
871228	2017 OM_{98}	—	July 24, 2017	Haleakala	Pan-STARRS 1	NYS	780 m	MPC · JPL
871229	2017 OK_{99}	—	July 25, 2017	Haleakala	Pan-STARRS 1	·	810 m	MPC · JPL
871230	2017 OD_{100}	—	July 30, 2017	Haleakala	Pan-STARRS 1	·	770 m	MPC · JPL
871231	2017 OM_{101}	—	July 25, 2017	Haleakala	Pan-STARRS 1	EUN	790 m	MPC · JPL
871232	2017 OF_{102}	—	June 21, 2017	ESA OGS	ESA OGS	·	870 m	MPC · JPL
871233	2017 OT_{102}	—	July 26, 2017	Haleakala	Pan-STARRS 1	·	510 m	MPC · JPL
871234	2017 OX_{103}	—	July 26, 2017	Haleakala	Pan-STARRS 1	·	1.4 km	MPC · JPL
871235	2017 OS_{106}	—	July 24, 2017	Haleakala	Pan-STARRS 1	·	1.7 km	MPC · JPL
871236	2017 OC_{107}	—	July 25, 2017	Haleakala	Pan-STARRS 1	·	2.8 km	MPC · JPL
871237	2017 OU_{107}	—	July 30, 2017	Haleakala	Pan-STARRS 1	·	1.2 km	MPC · JPL
871238	2017 OO_{112}	—	July 26, 2017	Haleakala	Pan-STARRS 1	·	1.2 km	MPC · JPL
871239	2017 OS_{112}	—	July 26, 2017	Haleakala	Pan-STARRS 1	·	850 m	MPC · JPL
871240	2017 OD_{114}	—	July 26, 2017	Haleakala	Pan-STARRS 1	·	1.0 km	MPC · JPL
871241	2017 OX_{114}	—	July 27, 2017	Haleakala	Pan-STARRS 1	·	1.1 km	MPC · JPL
871242	2017 OM_{116}	—	July 25, 2017	Haleakala	Pan-STARRS 1	·	840 m	MPC · JPL
871243	2017 OT_{117}	—	July 25, 2017	Haleakala	Pan-STARRS 1	·	1.7 km	MPC · JPL
871244	2017 OO_{118}	—	July 29, 2017	Haleakala	Pan-STARRS 1	·	630 m	MPC · JPL
871245	2017 OP_{118}	—	July 26, 2017	Haleakala	Pan-STARRS 1	NYS	750 m	MPC · JPL
871246	2017 OR_{118}	—	July 25, 2017	Haleakala	Pan-STARRS 1	·	790 m	MPC · JPL
871247	2017 OU_{121}	—	July 25, 2017	Haleakala	Pan-STARRS 1	·	790 m	MPC · JPL
871248	2017 OM_{123}	—	July 26, 2017	Haleakala	Pan-STARRS 1	·	860 m	MPC · JPL
871249	2017 OM_{124}	—	January 19, 2015	Haleakala	Pan-STARRS 1	·	850 m	MPC · JPL
871250	2017 OC_{125}	—	July 30, 2017	Haleakala	Pan-STARRS 1	(194)	1.1 km	MPC · JPL
871251	2017 OQ_{126}	—	May 13, 2009	Kitt Peak	Spacewatch	·	910 m	MPC · JPL
871252	2017 OS_{127}	—	July 30, 2017	Haleakala	Pan-STARRS 1	·	690 m	MPC · JPL
871253	2017 OX_{127}	—	July 26, 2017	Haleakala	Pan-STARRS 1	·	720 m	MPC · JPL
871254	2017 OO_{129}	—	November 26, 2014	Haleakala	Pan-STARRS 1	·	820 m	MPC · JPL
871255	2017 OP_{132}	—	July 25, 2017	Haleakala	Pan-STARRS 1	·	840 m	MPC · JPL
871256	2017 OQ_{132}	—	May 27, 2014	Haleakala	Pan-STARRS 1	H	330 m	MPC · JPL
871257	2017 OW_{132}	—	July 26, 2017	Haleakala	Pan-STARRS 1	·	430 m	MPC · JPL
871258	2017 OA_{138}	—	July 30, 2017	Haleakala	Pan-STARRS 1	·	990 m	MPC · JPL
871259	2017 OL_{139}	—	July 29, 2017	Haleakala	Pan-STARRS 1	EOS	1.3 km	MPC · JPL
871260	2017 OL_{144}	—	July 27, 2017	Haleakala	Pan-STARRS 1	·	2.8 km	MPC · JPL
871261	2017 OX_{176}	—	November 20, 2014	Haleakala	Pan-STARRS 1	·	730 m	MPC · JPL
871262	2017 OC_{179}	—	July 30, 2017	Haleakala	Pan-STARRS 1	·	1.8 km	MPC · JPL
871263	2017 OD_{188}	—	July 25, 2017	Haleakala	Pan-STARRS 1	·	480 m	MPC · JPL
871264	2017 PK_{1}	—	May 21, 2006	Mount Lemmon	Mount Lemmon Survey	·	510 m	MPC · JPL
871265	2017 PQ_{4}	—	February 5, 2011	Haleakala	Pan-STARRS 1	H	300 m	MPC · JPL
871266	2017 PL_{7}	—	August 1, 2017	Haleakala	Pan-STARRS 1	·	730 m	MPC · JPL
871267	2017 PZ_{13}	—	August 1, 2017	Haleakala	Pan-STARRS 1	·	820 m	MPC · JPL
871268	2017 PQ_{15}	—	August 28, 2005	Kitt Peak	Spacewatch	·	690 m	MPC · JPL
871269	2017 PD_{16}	—	July 9, 2013	Haleakala	Pan-STARRS 1	·	890 m	MPC · JPL
871270	2017 PK_{19}	—	August 1, 2017	Haleakala	Pan-STARRS 1	·	2.4 km	MPC · JPL
871271	2017 PJ_{26}	—	August 12, 2017	Haleakala	Pan-STARRS 1	AMO	480 m	MPC · JPL
871272	2017 PO_{27}	—	September 28, 1994	Kitt Peak	Spacewatch	NYS	840 m	MPC · JPL
871273	2017 PG_{32}	—	October 9, 2010	Mount Lemmon	Mount Lemmon Survey	·	940 m	MPC · JPL
871274	2017 PB_{33}	—	April 12, 2013	Haleakala	Pan-STARRS 1	NYS	740 m	MPC · JPL
871275	2017 PV_{36}	—	August 13, 2010	Kitt Peak	Spacewatch	·	490 m	MPC · JPL
871276	2017 PA_{37}	—	January 30, 2008	Mount Lemmon	Mount Lemmon Survey	NYS	630 m	MPC · JPL
871277	2017 PB_{38}	—	January 14, 2015	Haleakala	Pan-STARRS 1	NYS	810 m	MPC · JPL
871278	2017 PY_{38}	—	September 25, 2009	Mount Lemmon	Mount Lemmon Survey	·	770 m	MPC · JPL
871279	2017 PN_{41}	—	May 22, 2011	Mount Lemmon	Mount Lemmon Survey	·	2.1 km	MPC · JPL
871280	2017 PS_{41}	—	August 4, 2017	Haleakala	Pan-STARRS 1	·	520 m	MPC · JPL
871281	2017 PV_{41}	—	August 1, 2017	Haleakala	Pan-STARRS 1	·	1.4 km	MPC · JPL
871282	2017 PK_{42}	—	October 15, 2004	Kitt Peak	Spacewatch	·	1.4 km	MPC · JPL
871283	2017 PR_{42}	—	September 28, 2003	Kitt Peak	Spacewatch	·	1.5 km	MPC · JPL
871284	2017 PH_{43}	—	August 1, 2017	Haleakala	Pan-STARRS 1	(194)	1.0 km	MPC · JPL
871285	2017 PK_{43}	—	April 19, 2015	Cerro Tololo	DECam	JUN	800 m	MPC · JPL
871286	2017 PT_{43}	—	August 3, 2017	Haleakala	Pan-STARRS 1	·	900 m	MPC · JPL
871287	2017 PV_{44}	—	October 26, 2013	Mount Lemmon	Mount Lemmon Survey	·	620 m	MPC · JPL
871288	2017 PB_{45}	—	August 3, 2017	Haleakala	Pan-STARRS 1	·	730 m	MPC · JPL
871289	2017 PF_{48}	—	March 29, 2016	Cerro Tololo-DECam	DECam	·	470 m	MPC · JPL
871290	2017 PK_{48}	—	August 4, 2017	Haleakala	Pan-STARRS 1	·	790 m	MPC · JPL
871291	2017 PW_{48}	—	September 19, 2001	Sacramento Peak	SDSS	·	1.9 km	MPC · JPL
871292	2017 PF_{49}	—	August 1, 2017	Haleakala	Pan-STARRS 1	EUN	790 m	MPC · JPL
871293	2017 PX_{50}	—	August 1, 2017	Haleakala	Pan-STARRS 1	·	1.4 km	MPC · JPL
871294	2017 PC_{51}	—	August 1, 2017	Haleakala	Pan-STARRS 1	·	1.7 km	MPC · JPL
871295	2017 PH_{52}	—	August 14, 2017	Haleakala	Pan-STARRS 1	H	390 m	MPC · JPL
871296	2017 PE_{55}	—	August 15, 2017	Haleakala	Pan-STARRS 1	·	2.9 km	MPC · JPL
871297	2017 PV_{55}	—	August 1, 2017	Haleakala	Pan-STARRS 1	·	910 m	MPC · JPL
871298	2017 PA_{56}	—	August 1, 2017	Haleakala	Pan-STARRS 1	·	670 m	MPC · JPL
871299	2017 PB_{56}	—	April 1, 2016	Haleakala	Pan-STARRS 1	·	410 m	MPC · JPL
871300	2017 PQ_{56}	—	August 4, 2017	Haleakala	Pan-STARRS 1	·	1.8 km	MPC · JPL

== 871301–871400 ==
back to top

Designation			Discovery			Properties		Ref
Permanent	Provisional	Named after	Date	Site	Discoverer(s)	Category	Diam.	Ref
871301	2017 PE_{58}	—	August 1, 2017	Haleakala	Pan-STARRS 1	·	940 m	MPC · JPL
871302	2017 PN_{66}	—	August 3, 2017	Haleakala	Pan-STARRS 1	·	870 m	MPC · JPL
871303	2017 PQ_{66}	—	August 1, 2017	Haleakala	Pan-STARRS 1	·	860 m	MPC · JPL
871304	2017 PW_{70}	—	August 14, 2017	Haleakala	Pan-STARRS 1	PHO	720 m	MPC · JPL
871305	2017 PT_{71}	—	July 30, 2017	Haleakala	Pan-STARRS 1	·	730 m	MPC · JPL
871306	2017 PS_{73}	—	August 1, 2017	Haleakala	Pan-STARRS 1	·	2.0 km	MPC · JPL
871307	2017 PQ_{92}	—	January 16, 2015	Haleakala	Pan-STARRS 1	·	710 m	MPC · JPL
871308	2017 QJ	—	December 20, 2012	Nogales	M. Schwartz, P. R. Holvorcem	·	1.5 km	MPC · JPL
871309	2017 QZ_{4}	—	July 26, 2017	Haleakala	Pan-STARRS 1	·	830 m	MPC · JPL
871310	2017 QQ_{8}	—	January 8, 2016	Haleakala	Pan-STARRS 1	H	340 m	MPC · JPL
871311	2017 QY_{8}	—	October 25, 2014	Haleakala	Pan-STARRS 1	·	440 m	MPC · JPL
871312	2017 QH_{9}	—	November 30, 2014	Haleakala	Pan-STARRS 1	·	970 m	MPC · JPL
871313	2017 QA_{12}	—	April 6, 2013	Mount Lemmon	Mount Lemmon Survey	·	420 m	MPC · JPL
871314	2017 QZ_{12}	—	July 26, 2017	Haleakala	Pan-STARRS 1	MAS	490 m	MPC · JPL
871315	2017 QL_{14}	—	September 19, 2003	Kitt Peak	Spacewatch	·	620 m	MPC · JPL
871316	2017 QH_{16}	—	January 16, 2016	Haleakala	Pan-STARRS 1	H	330 m	MPC · JPL
871317	2017 QB_{18}	—	September 2, 2013	Calar Alto	F. Hormuth	·	220 m	MPC · JPL
871318	2017 QE_{19}	—	December 7, 2008	Mount Lemmon	Mount Lemmon Survey	·	1.9 km	MPC · JPL
871319	2017 QF_{23}	—	January 27, 2011	Mount Lemmon	Mount Lemmon Survey	·	890 m	MPC · JPL
871320	2017 QR_{28}	—	July 25, 2017	Haleakala	Pan-STARRS 1	·	730 m	MPC · JPL
871321	2017 QQ_{30}	—	July 25, 2017	Haleakala	Pan-STARRS 1	·	1.4 km	MPC · JPL
871322	2017 QX_{33}	—	June 30, 2017	Mount Lemmon	Mount Lemmon Survey	·	600 m	MPC · JPL
871323	2017 QO_{41}	—	July 27, 2013	Siding Spring	SSS	·	1.0 km	MPC · JPL
871324	2017 QQ_{45}	—	October 8, 2012	Kitt Peak	Spacewatch	·	1.8 km	MPC · JPL
871325	2017 QB_{47}	—	April 18, 2015	Cerro Tololo	DECam	3:2	3.6 km	MPC · JPL
871326	2017 QM_{48}	—	November 29, 2014	Haleakala	Pan-STARRS 1	·	890 m	MPC · JPL
871327	2017 QQ_{52}	—	September 19, 2006	Anderson Mesa	LONEOS	·	2.7 km	MPC · JPL
871328	2017 QO_{55}	—	January 24, 2015	Haleakala	Pan-STARRS 1	·	970 m	MPC · JPL
871329	2017 QH_{56}	—	October 1, 2013	Kitt Peak	Spacewatch	·	980 m	MPC · JPL
871330	2017 QV_{57}	—	August 16, 2012	Haleakala	Pan-STARRS 1	·	1.3 km	MPC · JPL
871331	2017 QL_{59}	—	August 20, 2017	Haleakala	Pan-STARRS 1	·	2.3 km	MPC · JPL
871332	2017 QR_{61}	—	September 24, 2012	Mount Lemmon	Mount Lemmon Survey	·	1.8 km	MPC · JPL
871333	2017 QR_{64}	—	November 15, 2012	Mount Lemmon	Mount Lemmon Survey	·	2.1 km	MPC · JPL
871334	2017 QG_{67}	—	June 7, 2013	Haleakala	Pan-STARRS 1	NYS	670 m	MPC · JPL
871335	2017 QY_{68}	—	August 24, 2017	Haleakala	Pan-STARRS 1	(883)	560 m	MPC · JPL
871336	2017 QL_{79}	—	July 1, 2011	Kitt Peak	Spacewatch	·	2.4 km	MPC · JPL
871337	2017 QM_{87}	—	August 30, 2017	Mount Lemmon	Mount Lemmon Survey	H	360 m	MPC · JPL
871338	2017 QY_{87}	—	August 22, 2017	Haleakala	Pan-STARRS 1	·	2.0 km	MPC · JPL
871339	2017 QZ_{87}	—	August 18, 2017	Haleakala	Pan-STARRS 1	H	400 m	MPC · JPL
871340	2017 QR_{88}	—	August 16, 2017	Haleakala	Pan-STARRS 1	H	350 m	MPC · JPL
871341	2017 QY_{88}	—	August 31, 2017	Haleakala	Pan-STARRS 1	·	460 m	MPC · JPL
871342	2017 QN_{90}	—	November 6, 1996	Kitt Peak	Spacewatch	H	400 m	MPC · JPL
871343	2017 QR_{91}	—	August 23, 2017	Haleakala	Pan-STARRS 1	EOS	1.2 km	MPC · JPL
871344	2017 QS_{92}	—	August 18, 2017	Haleakala	Pan-STARRS 1	·	540 m	MPC · JPL
871345	2017 QG_{93}	—	August 16, 2017	Haleakala	Pan-STARRS 1	3:2 · SHU	3.4 km	MPC · JPL
871346	2017 QH_{93}	—	August 31, 2017	Haleakala	Pan-STARRS 1	·	1.4 km	MPC · JPL
871347	2017 QK_{94}	—	August 24, 2017	Haleakala	Pan-STARRS 1	·	820 m	MPC · JPL
871348	2017 QU_{94}	—	August 31, 2017	Haleakala	Pan-STARRS 1	WIT	670 m	MPC · JPL
871349	2017 QJ_{95}	—	August 31, 2017	Haleakala	Pan-STARRS 1	·	590 m	MPC · JPL
871350	2017 QO_{95}	—	August 24, 2017	Haleakala	Pan-STARRS 1	·	1.2 km	MPC · JPL
871351	2017 QY_{95}	—	August 31, 2017	Haleakala	Pan-STARRS 1	·	610 m	MPC · JPL
871352	2017 QT_{101}	—	August 30, 2017	Mount Lemmon	Mount Lemmon Survey	·	530 m	MPC · JPL
871353	2017 QR_{102}	—	August 17, 2017	Haleakala	Pan-STARRS 1	·	590 m	MPC · JPL
871354	2017 QX_{102}	—	August 18, 2017	Haleakala	Pan-STARRS 1	·	870 m	MPC · JPL
871355	2017 QA_{103}	—	August 23, 2017	Haleakala	Pan-STARRS 1	V	370 m	MPC · JPL
871356	2017 QR_{108}	—	August 18, 2017	Haleakala	Pan-STARRS 1	EOS	1.3 km	MPC · JPL
871357	2017 QL_{109}	—	August 31, 2017	Haleakala	Pan-STARRS 1	·	2.1 km	MPC · JPL
871358	2017 QS_{109}	—	August 31, 2017	Haleakala	Pan-STARRS 1	·	1.3 km	MPC · JPL
871359	2017 QG_{113}	—	July 25, 2017	Haleakala	Pan-STARRS 1	·	880 m	MPC · JPL
871360	2017 QT_{113}	—	March 12, 2016	Haleakala	Pan-STARRS 1	·	730 m	MPC · JPL
871361	2017 QM_{117}	—	August 24, 2017	Haleakala	Pan-STARRS 1	EOS	1.3 km	MPC · JPL
871362	2017 QM_{119}	—	August 28, 2017	Mount Lemmon	Mount Lemmon Survey	·	580 m	MPC · JPL
871363	2017 QN_{119}	—	August 16, 2017	Haleakala	Pan-STARRS 1	·	450 m	MPC · JPL
871364	2017 QB_{120}	—	August 24, 2017	Haleakala	Pan-STARRS 1	·	1.3 km	MPC · JPL
871365	2017 QO_{120}	—	August 23, 2017	Haleakala	Pan-STARRS 1	·	760 m	MPC · JPL
871366	2017 QY_{121}	—	August 17, 2017	Haleakala	Pan-STARRS 1	EOS	1.3 km	MPC · JPL
871367	2017 QZ_{122}	—	August 31, 2017	Haleakala	Pan-STARRS 1	·	1.0 km	MPC · JPL
871368	2017 QL_{123}	—	August 16, 2017	Haleakala	Pan-STARRS 1	·	970 m	MPC · JPL
871369	2017 QA_{125}	—	April 18, 2015	Cerro Tololo	DECam	·	1.3 km	MPC · JPL
871370	2017 QM_{130}	—	August 17, 2017	Haleakala	Pan-STARRS 1	MAR	670 m	MPC · JPL
871371	2017 QR_{130}	—	August 23, 2017	Haleakala	Pan-STARRS 1	·	610 m	MPC · JPL
871372	2017 QR_{131}	—	May 1, 2016	Cerro Tololo	DECam	·	830 m	MPC · JPL
871373	2017 QC_{132}	—	August 31, 2017	Mount Lemmon	Mount Lemmon Survey	·	770 m	MPC · JPL
871374	2017 QL_{132}	—	August 16, 2017	Haleakala	Pan-STARRS 1	·	740 m	MPC · JPL
871375	2017 QT_{132}	—	August 23, 2017	Haleakala	Pan-STARRS 1	·	2.4 km	MPC · JPL
871376	2017 QF_{133}	—	August 20, 2017	Haleakala	Pan-STARRS 1	·	2.5 km	MPC · JPL
871377	2017 QR_{135}	—	August 31, 2017	Haleakala	Pan-STARRS 1	·	1.5 km	MPC · JPL
871378	2017 QF_{136}	—	August 24, 2017	Haleakala	Pan-STARRS 1	H	330 m	MPC · JPL
871379	2017 QW_{138}	—	October 8, 2010	Catalina	CSS	·	830 m	MPC · JPL
871380	2017 QS_{139}	—	August 31, 2017	Haleakala	Pan-STARRS 1	EOS	1.3 km	MPC · JPL
871381	2017 QA_{144}	—	January 28, 2015	Haleakala	Pan-STARRS 1	·	1.8 km	MPC · JPL
871382	2017 QC_{144}	—	December 21, 2014	Haleakala	Pan-STARRS 1	·	640 m	MPC · JPL
871383	2017 QP_{144}	—	August 16, 2017	Haleakala	Pan-STARRS 1	H	280 m	MPC · JPL
871384	2017 QZ_{146}	—	August 16, 2017	Haleakala	Pan-STARRS 1	HYG	1.9 km	MPC · JPL
871385	2017 QE_{150}	—	August 24, 2017	Haleakala	Pan-STARRS 1	·	1.9 km	MPC · JPL
871386	2017 QN_{181}	—	August 23, 2017	Haleakala	Pan-STARRS 1	·	2.0 km	MPC · JPL
871387	2017 QF_{220}	—	April 9, 2016	Haleakala	Pan-STARRS 1	·	620 m	MPC · JPL
871388	2017 RS_{1}	—	March 5, 2016	Haleakala	Pan-STARRS 1	H	370 m	MPC · JPL
871389	2017 RB_{2}	—	December 13, 2015	Haleakala	Pan-STARRS 1	·	300 m	MPC · JPL
871390	2017 RG_{3}	—	September 1, 2006	Molėtai	K. Černis, K. Zdanavičius	·	970 m	MPC · JPL
871391	2017 RO_{3}	—	January 31, 2009	Kitt Peak	Spacewatch	·	540 m	MPC · JPL
871392	2017 RX_{3}	—	February 9, 2016	Mount Lemmon	Mount Lemmon Survey	·	970 m	MPC · JPL
871393	2017 RC_{5}	—	September 14, 2010	Mount Lemmon	Mount Lemmon Survey	·	550 m	MPC · JPL
871394	2017 RL_{6}	—	March 10, 2016	Haleakala	Pan-STARRS 1	·	800 m	MPC · JPL
871395	2017 RB_{9}	—	July 15, 2013	Haleakala	Pan-STARRS 1	NYS	710 m	MPC · JPL
871396	2017 RX_{11}	—	October 31, 2014	Mount Lemmon	Mount Lemmon Survey	·	490 m	MPC · JPL
871397	2017 RK_{13}	—	September 15, 2017	Haleakala	Pan-STARRS 1	MAR	580 m	MPC · JPL
871398	2017 RV_{14}	—	March 2, 2016	Haleakala	Pan-STARRS 1	H	400 m	MPC · JPL
871399	2017 RD_{15}	—	September 13, 2017	Haleakala	Pan-STARRS 1	AMO	430 m	MPC · JPL
871400	2017 RH_{19}	—	September 25, 2006	Kitt Peak	Spacewatch	·	1.9 km	MPC · JPL

== 871401–871500 ==
back to top

Designation			Discovery			Properties		Ref
Permanent	Provisional	Named after	Date	Site	Discoverer(s)	Category	Diam.	Ref
871401	2017 RL_{21}	—	March 30, 2016	Haleakala	Pan-STARRS 1	T_{j} (2.95)	2.4 km	MPC · JPL
871402	2017 RQ_{21}	—	April 12, 2016	Haleakala	Pan-STARRS 1	THB	2.0 km	MPC · JPL
871403	2017 RA_{22}	—	July 25, 2017	Haleakala	Pan-STARRS 1	3:2	3.6 km	MPC · JPL
871404	2017 RC_{22}	—	September 30, 2006	Catalina	CSS	·	910 m	MPC · JPL
871405	2017 RU_{28}	—	September 3, 2013	Haleakala	Pan-STARRS 1	MAR	590 m	MPC · JPL
871406	2017 RS_{34}	—	August 3, 2017	Haleakala	Pan-STARRS 1	·	1.2 km	MPC · JPL
871407	2017 RC_{36}	—	August 8, 2013	Kitt Peak	Spacewatch	·	800 m	MPC · JPL
871408	2017 RW_{38}	—	October 13, 2001	Palomar	NEAT	·	1.8 km	MPC · JPL
871409	2017 RW_{39}	—	August 1, 2009	Kitt Peak	Spacewatch	3:2	3.7 km	MPC · JPL
871410	2017 RJ_{40}	—	December 20, 2007	Kitt Peak	Spacewatch	·	530 m	MPC · JPL
871411	2017 RT_{40}	—	September 14, 2017	Haleakala	Pan-STARRS 1	·	460 m	MPC · JPL
871412	2017 RZ_{47}	—	September 6, 2013	Mount Lemmon	Mount Lemmon Survey	·	480 m	MPC · JPL
871413	2017 RA_{50}	—	April 5, 2016	Haleakala	Pan-STARRS 1	·	650 m	MPC · JPL
871414	2017 RH_{51}	—	September 14, 2017	Haleakala	Pan-STARRS 1	·	1.3 km	MPC · JPL
871415	2017 RZ_{51}	—	November 23, 2006	Mount Lemmon	Mount Lemmon Survey	·	830 m	MPC · JPL
871416	2017 RG_{54}	—	September 3, 2013	Mount Lemmon	Mount Lemmon Survey	·	650 m	MPC · JPL
871417	2017 RD_{55}	—	September 18, 2003	Kitt Peak	Spacewatch	·	430 m	MPC · JPL
871418	2017 RO_{56}	—	September 23, 2013	Kitt Peak	Spacewatch	·	490 m	MPC · JPL
871419	2017 RS_{57}	—	February 27, 2009	Mount Lemmon	Mount Lemmon Survey	·	460 m	MPC · JPL
871420	2017 RG_{60}	—	February 16, 2015	Haleakala	Pan-STARRS 1	·	580 m	MPC · JPL
871421	2017 RP_{61}	—	January 22, 2015	Haleakala	Pan-STARRS 1	AST	1.2 km	MPC · JPL
871422	2017 RW_{61}	—	November 6, 2010	Mount Lemmon	Mount Lemmon Survey	3:2	4.4 km	MPC · JPL
871423	2017 RS_{66}	—	August 28, 2013	Mount Lemmon	Mount Lemmon Survey	·	820 m	MPC · JPL
871424	2017 RB_{71}	—	August 30, 2013	Haleakala	Pan-STARRS 1	PHO	700 m	MPC · JPL
871425	2017 RE_{71}	—	July 27, 2017	Haleakala	Pan-STARRS 1	·	620 m	MPC · JPL
871426	2017 RR_{72}	—	August 12, 2013	Kitt Peak	Spacewatch	·	810 m	MPC · JPL
871427	2017 RU_{72}	—	August 27, 2006	Kitt Peak	Spacewatch	·	1.7 km	MPC · JPL
871428	2017 RX_{72}	—	February 5, 2009	Kitt Peak	Spacewatch	·	410 m	MPC · JPL
871429	2017 RJ_{74}	—	November 18, 2006	Kitt Peak	Spacewatch	·	900 m	MPC · JPL
871430	2017 RE_{75}	—	September 14, 2017	Haleakala	Pan-STARRS 1	TIR	2.2 km	MPC · JPL
871431	2017 RL_{76}	—	October 16, 2003	Kitt Peak	Spacewatch	·	580 m	MPC · JPL
871432	2017 RM_{85}	—	August 12, 2013	Haleakala	Pan-STARRS 1	·	800 m	MPC · JPL
871433	2017 RB_{86}	—	December 13, 2006	Mount Lemmon	Mount Lemmon Survey	·	2.0 km	MPC · JPL
871434	2017 RG_{87}	—	August 18, 2013	Haleakala	Pan-STARRS 1	NYS	830 m	MPC · JPL
871435	2017 RJ_{88}	—	November 4, 2004	Kitt Peak	Spacewatch	·	500 m	MPC · JPL
871436	2017 RA_{89}	—	September 17, 2010	Mount Lemmon	Mount Lemmon Survey	·	550 m	MPC · JPL
871437	2017 RO_{89}	—	November 12, 2012	Mount Lemmon	Mount Lemmon Survey	·	1.3 km	MPC · JPL
871438	2017 RW_{90}	—	November 1, 2007	Kitt Peak	Spacewatch	·	1.2 km	MPC · JPL
871439	2017 RO_{92}	—	September 21, 2011	Mount Lemmon	Mount Lemmon Survey	·	2.3 km	MPC · JPL
871440	2017 RJ_{94}	—	February 8, 2008	Mount Lemmon	Mount Lemmon Survey	·	770 m	MPC · JPL
871441	2017 RN_{94}	—	September 19, 2009	Mount Lemmon	Mount Lemmon Survey	·	690 m	MPC · JPL
871442	2017 RN_{95}	—	January 13, 2015	Haleakala	Pan-STARRS 1	·	700 m	MPC · JPL
871443	2017 RK_{96}	—	August 12, 2013	Haleakala	Pan-STARRS 1	NYS	820 m	MPC · JPL
871444	2017 RK_{99}	—	October 1, 1998	Kitt Peak	Spacewatch	MAS	500 m	MPC · JPL
871445	2017 RO_{100}	—	November 29, 2014	Kitt Peak	Spacewatch	·	890 m	MPC · JPL
871446	2017 RY_{101}	—	October 19, 2006	Kitt Peak	Deep Ecliptic Survey	NYS	660 m	MPC · JPL
871447	2017 RB_{105}	—	May 5, 2010	Mount Lemmon	Mount Lemmon Survey	·	2.0 km	MPC · JPL
871448	2017 RN_{107}	—	September 2, 2017	Haleakala	Pan-STARRS 1	·	830 m	MPC · JPL
871449	2017 RU_{107}	—	October 13, 2013	Kitt Peak	Spacewatch	·	1.2 km	MPC · JPL
871450	2017 RW_{109}	—	July 18, 2013	Haleakala	Pan-STARRS 1	·	770 m	MPC · JPL
871451	2017 RM_{110}	—	September 10, 2004	Kitt Peak	Spacewatch	·	1.4 km	MPC · JPL
871452	2017 RN_{110}	—	September 14, 2017	Haleakala	Pan-STARRS 1	·	2.5 km	MPC · JPL
871453	2017 RA_{111}	—	September 1, 2017	Haleakala	Pan-STARRS 1	·	2.2 km	MPC · JPL
871454	2017 RZ_{111}	—	September 3, 2017	Haleakala	Pan-STARRS 1	TIR	2.2 km	MPC · JPL
871455	2017 RB_{112}	—	September 14, 2017	Haleakala	Pan-STARRS 1	H	380 m	MPC · JPL
871456	2017 RW_{114}	—	September 14, 2017	Haleakala	Pan-STARRS 1	·	790 m	MPC · JPL
871457	2017 RE_{116}	—	September 14, 2017	Haleakala	Pan-STARRS 1	·	540 m	MPC · JPL
871458	2017 RT_{116}	—	September 2, 2017	Haleakala	Pan-STARRS 1	·	690 m	MPC · JPL
871459	2017 RB_{118}	—	September 1, 2017	Haleakala	Pan-STARRS 1	·	1.4 km	MPC · JPL
871460	2017 RM_{118}	—	September 2, 2017	Haleakala	Pan-STARRS 1	·	720 m	MPC · JPL
871461	2017 RV_{118}	—	October 11, 2006	Palomar	NEAT	·	2.4 km	MPC · JPL
871462	2017 RY_{118}	—	September 13, 2017	Haleakala	Pan-STARRS 1	·	1.6 km	MPC · JPL
871463	2017 RU_{121}	—	September 1, 2017	Haleakala	Pan-STARRS 1	H	420 m	MPC · JPL
871464	2017 RF_{123}	—	September 15, 2017	Haleakala	Pan-STARRS 1	BRA	1.1 km	MPC · JPL
871465	2017 RU_{128}	—	September 14, 2017	Haleakala	Pan-STARRS 1	·	760 m	MPC · JPL
871466	2017 RF_{130}	—	September 15, 2017	Haleakala	Pan-STARRS 1	·	1.0 km	MPC · JPL
871467	2017 RG_{130}	—	September 15, 2017	Haleakala	Pan-STARRS 1	·	2.1 km	MPC · JPL
871468	2017 RR_{130}	—	May 20, 2015	Cerro Tololo	DECam	·	2.0 km	MPC · JPL
871469	2017 RQ_{132}	—	September 14, 2017	Haleakala	Pan-STARRS 1	·	2.1 km	MPC · JPL
871470	2017 RZ_{133}	—	September 2, 2017	Haleakala	Pan-STARRS 1	·	920 m	MPC · JPL
871471	2017 RA_{134}	—	September 2, 2017	Haleakala	Pan-STARRS 1	·	950 m	MPC · JPL
871472	2017 RS_{136}	—	January 28, 2015	Haleakala	Pan-STARRS 1	·	1.4 km	MPC · JPL
871473	2017 RX_{138}	—	August 12, 2013	Haleakala	Pan-STARRS 1	·	810 m	MPC · JPL
871474	2017 RM_{140}	—	September 1, 2017	Mount Lemmon	Mount Lemmon Survey	·	2.6 km	MPC · JPL
871475	2017 RU_{144}	—	May 1, 2016	Cerro Tololo	DECam	·	510 m	MPC · JPL
871476	2017 RC_{146}	—	September 13, 2017	Haleakala	Pan-STARRS 1	·	2.6 km	MPC · JPL
871477	2017 RJ_{151}	—	September 14, 2017	Haleakala	Pan-STARRS 1	EOS	1.5 km	MPC · JPL
871478	2017 SB_{7}	—	July 13, 2013	Haleakala	Pan-STARRS 1	·	960 m	MPC · JPL
871479	2017 SB_{9}	—	August 27, 2006	Kitt Peak	Spacewatch	NYS	550 m	MPC · JPL
871480	2017 SU_{22}	—	September 21, 2017	Haleakala	Pan-STARRS 1	·	940 m	MPC · JPL
871481	2017 SY_{22}	—	October 17, 2012	Mount Lemmon	Mount Lemmon Survey	·	1.3 km	MPC · JPL
871482	2017 SZ_{22}	—	January 21, 2015	Haleakala	Pan-STARRS 1	·	860 m	MPC · JPL
871483	2017 SU_{24}	—	August 26, 2000	Cerro Tololo	Deep Ecliptic Survey	·	860 m	MPC · JPL
871484	2017 SS_{25}	—	October 21, 2008	Kitt Peak	Spacewatch	·	1.3 km	MPC · JPL
871485	2017 SS_{29}	—	August 7, 2016	Haleakala	Pan-STARRS 1	·	2.2 km	MPC · JPL
871486	2017 SE_{30}	—	May 29, 2012	Mount Lemmon	Mount Lemmon Survey	KON	1.5 km	MPC · JPL
871487	2017 SV_{33}	—	August 20, 2000	Kitt Peak	Spacewatch	·	1.0 km	MPC · JPL
871488	2017 SK_{36}	—	June 5, 2011	Mount Lemmon	Mount Lemmon Survey	·	2.5 km	MPC · JPL
871489	2017 SL_{37}	—	July 25, 2011	Haleakala	Pan-STARRS 1	·	2.2 km	MPC · JPL
871490	2017 SM_{39}	—	September 28, 2017	XuYi	PMO NEO Survey Program	JUN	650 m	MPC · JPL
871491	2017 SU_{39}	—	September 25, 2017	Haleakala	Pan-STARRS 1	·	890 m	MPC · JPL
871492	2017 SK_{40}	—	September 1, 2017	Mount Lemmon	Mount Lemmon Survey	H	420 m	MPC · JPL
871493	2017 SA_{43}	—	September 30, 2017	Haleakala	Pan-STARRS 1	·	820 m	MPC · JPL
871494	2017 SS_{44}	—	March 17, 2016	Mount Lemmon	Mount Lemmon Survey	·	900 m	MPC · JPL
871495	2017 SY_{46}	—	October 23, 2006	Kitt Peak	Spacewatch	·	2.1 km	MPC · JPL
871496	2017 SR_{48}	—	December 21, 2014	Mount Lemmon	Mount Lemmon Survey	·	1.0 km	MPC · JPL
871497	2017 SN_{50}	—	July 28, 2011	Haleakala	Pan-STARRS 1	·	2.0 km	MPC · JPL
871498	2017 SH_{51}	—	September 27, 2006	Kitt Peak	Spacewatch	H	380 m	MPC · JPL
871499	2017 SD_{55}	—	March 21, 2015	Haleakala	Pan-STARRS 1	(5)	800 m	MPC · JPL
871500	2017 SG_{56}	—	February 14, 2016	Haleakala	Pan-STARRS 1	H	330 m	MPC · JPL

== 871501–871600 ==
back to top

Designation			Discovery			Properties		Ref
Permanent	Provisional	Named after	Date	Site	Discoverer(s)	Category	Diam.	Ref
871501	2017 SR_{56}	—	March 6, 2016	Haleakala	Pan-STARRS 1	·	950 m	MPC · JPL
871502	2017 SU_{56}	—	April 3, 2016	Haleakala	Pan-STARRS 1	·	740 m	MPC · JPL
871503	2017 SH_{57}	—	October 1, 2013	Kitt Peak	Spacewatch	·	890 m	MPC · JPL
871504	2017 SL_{57}	—	December 29, 2011	Kitt Peak	Spacewatch	·	500 m	MPC · JPL
871505	2017 SP_{57}	—	October 27, 2012	Mount Lemmon	Mount Lemmon Survey	·	1.8 km	MPC · JPL
871506	2017 SN_{60}	—	May 14, 2008	Mount Lemmon	Mount Lemmon Survey	·	720 m	MPC · JPL
871507	2017 SS_{61}	—	September 16, 2017	Haleakala	Pan-STARRS 1	·	920 m	MPC · JPL
871508	2017 SY_{61}	—	September 16, 2017	Haleakala	Pan-STARRS 1	·	920 m	MPC · JPL
871509	2017 SM_{62}	—	September 22, 2006	Anderson Mesa	LONEOS	·	2.9 km	MPC · JPL
871510	2017 SX_{68}	—	August 24, 2011	Haleakala	Pan-STARRS 1	THM	1.9 km	MPC · JPL
871511	2017 SS_{70}	—	October 17, 2010	Mount Lemmon	Mount Lemmon Survey	·	700 m	MPC · JPL
871512	2017 SB_{75}	—	September 30, 2006	Mount Lemmon	Mount Lemmon Survey	·	1.7 km	MPC · JPL
871513	2017 SJ_{75}	—	October 28, 2006	Mount Lemmon	Mount Lemmon Survey	·	700 m	MPC · JPL
871514	2017 SR_{76}	—	October 18, 2012	Haleakala	Pan-STARRS 1	·	1.7 km	MPC · JPL
871515	2017 SA_{78}	—	August 28, 2006	Catalina	CSS	·	710 m	MPC · JPL
871516	2017 SK_{80}	—	August 31, 2017	Haleakala	Pan-STARRS 1	EUN	640 m	MPC · JPL
871517	2017 SL_{80}	—	January 19, 2015	Kitt Peak	Spacewatch	NYS	740 m	MPC · JPL
871518	2017 SU_{90}	—	March 10, 2016	Haleakala	Pan-STARRS 1	·	700 m	MPC · JPL
871519	2017 SR_{93}	—	February 5, 2016	Haleakala	Pan-STARRS 1	·	640 m	MPC · JPL
871520	2017 SR_{94}	—	September 30, 2011	Kitt Peak	Spacewatch	·	2.3 km	MPC · JPL
871521	2017 SJ_{95}	—	November 27, 2013	Mount Lemmon	Mount Lemmon Survey	·	1.3 km	MPC · JPL
871522	2017 SZ_{95}	—	September 26, 2006	Kitt Peak	Spacewatch	·	2.2 km	MPC · JPL
871523	2017 SA_{97}	—	January 8, 2007	Mount Lemmon	Mount Lemmon Survey	·	890 m	MPC · JPL
871524	2017 SX_{100}	—	September 18, 2017	Haleakala	Pan-STARRS 1	·	1.3 km	MPC · JPL
871525	2017 SZ_{101}	—	October 11, 2010	Mount Lemmon	Mount Lemmon Survey	·	630 m	MPC · JPL
871526	2017 SE_{102}	—	August 27, 2009	Kitt Peak	Spacewatch	3:2 · SHU	4.0 km	MPC · JPL
871527	2017 SK_{102}	—	October 2, 2013	Mount Lemmon	Mount Lemmon Survey	·	1.1 km	MPC · JPL
871528	2017 SO_{103}	—	February 12, 2016	Haleakala	Pan-STARRS 1	H	300 m	MPC · JPL
871529	2017 SM_{105}	—	January 12, 2002	Kitt Peak	Spacewatch	·	900 m	MPC · JPL
871530	2017 SC_{106}	—	October 9, 2010	Haleakala	Pan-STARRS 1	·	620 m	MPC · JPL
871531	2017 SR_{106}	—	September 5, 2000	Bro	Uppsala-DLR Asteroid Survey	·	990 m	MPC · JPL
871532	2017 SS_{109}	—	July 2, 2013	Haleakala	Pan-STARRS 1	NYS	920 m	MPC · JPL
871533	2017 SQ_{111}	—	August 27, 2006	Kitt Peak	Spacewatch	·	1.9 km	MPC · JPL
871534	2017 SF_{112}	—	October 18, 2012	Mount Lemmon	Mount Lemmon Survey	EOS	1.2 km	MPC · JPL
871535	2017 SH_{112}	—	April 1, 2016	Haleakala	Pan-STARRS 1	·	680 m	MPC · JPL
871536	2017 SX_{114}	—	February 5, 2011	Haleakala	Pan-STARRS 1	·	860 m	MPC · JPL
871537	2017 SP_{115}	—	November 11, 2013	Kitt Peak	Spacewatch	·	1.7 km	MPC · JPL
871538	2017 SU_{119}	—	March 17, 2015	Haleakala	Pan-STARRS 1	·	1.9 km	MPC · JPL
871539	2017 SL_{123}	—	September 25, 2017	Haleakala	Pan-STARRS 1	·	490 m	MPC · JPL
871540	2017 SQ_{123}	—	March 6, 2016	Haleakala	Pan-STARRS 1	H	370 m	MPC · JPL
871541	2017 SA_{126}	—	November 27, 2010	Mount Lemmon	Mount Lemmon Survey	·	590 m	MPC · JPL
871542	2017 SU_{126}	—	September 26, 2017	Haleakala	Pan-STARRS 1	·	500 m	MPC · JPL
871543	2017 SC_{128}	—	August 17, 2006	Palomar	NEAT	·	900 m	MPC · JPL
871544	2017 SZ_{129}	—	June 20, 2013	Haleakala	Pan-STARRS 1	·	860 m	MPC · JPL
871545	2017 SM_{133}	—	September 24, 2017	Haleakala	Pan-STARRS 1	H	390 m	MPC · JPL
871546	2017 SS_{133}	—	September 19, 2017	Haleakala	Pan-STARRS 1	·	1.1 km	MPC · JPL
871547	2017 ST_{133}	—	September 30, 2017	Haleakala	Pan-STARRS 1	·	920 m	MPC · JPL
871548	2017 SW_{133}	—	September 22, 2017	Haleakala	Pan-STARRS 1	·	2.2 km	MPC · JPL
871549	2017 SN_{134}	—	April 23, 2014	Cerro Tololo	DECam	·	1.7 km	MPC · JPL
871550	2017 SC_{135}	—	April 21, 2015	Cerro Tololo	DECam	·	1.2 km	MPC · JPL
871551	2017 SF_{135}	—	July 20, 2004	Siding Spring	SSS	(1547)	1.5 km	MPC · JPL
871552	2017 SK_{135}	—	September 18, 2017	Haleakala	Pan-STARRS 1	(5)	860 m	MPC · JPL
871553	2017 SS_{135}	—	October 1, 2008	Mount Lemmon	Mount Lemmon Survey	EUN	880 m	MPC · JPL
871554	2017 ST_{135}	—	September 24, 2017	Haleakala	Pan-STARRS 1	·	2.1 km	MPC · JPL
871555	2017 SL_{138}	—	September 30, 2017	Haleakala	Pan-STARRS 1	·	900 m	MPC · JPL
871556	2017 SC_{140}	—	April 7, 2011	Kitt Peak	Spacewatch	H	350 m	MPC · JPL
871557	2017 SX_{142}	—	September 30, 2017	Haleakala	Pan-STARRS 1	·	2.4 km	MPC · JPL
871558	2017 SQ_{144}	—	April 23, 2014	Cerro Tololo	DECam	·	2.0 km	MPC · JPL
871559	2017 SL_{146}	—	September 24, 2017	Haleakala	Pan-STARRS 1	·	780 m	MPC · JPL
871560	2017 SC_{147}	—	September 22, 2017	Haleakala	Pan-STARRS 1	·	940 m	MPC · JPL
871561	2017 SK_{151}	—	September 7, 2004	Kitt Peak	Spacewatch	·	1.3 km	MPC · JPL
871562	2017 SQ_{151}	—	September 19, 2017	Haleakala	Pan-STARRS 1	·	1.0 km	MPC · JPL
871563	2017 SL_{156}	—	November 28, 2013	Catalina	CSS	·	1.1 km	MPC · JPL
871564	2017 SW_{156}	—	September 23, 2017	Haleakala	Pan-STARRS 1	URS	2.1 km	MPC · JPL
871565	2017 ST_{159}	—	October 8, 2008	Kitt Peak	Spacewatch	·	1.2 km	MPC · JPL
871566	2017 SC_{160}	—	September 27, 2017	Haleakala	Pan-STARRS 1	THB	2.3 km	MPC · JPL
871567	2017 SV_{161}	—	September 27, 2017	Mount Lemmon	Mount Lemmon Survey	PHO	590 m	MPC · JPL
871568	2017 SM_{162}	—	September 27, 2006	Kitt Peak	Spacewatch	·	1.7 km	MPC · JPL
871569	2017 SR_{164}	—	September 21, 2017	Haleakala	Pan-STARRS 1	EUN	830 m	MPC · JPL
871570	2017 SN_{165}	—	September 23, 2017	Haleakala	Pan-STARRS 1	·	1.2 km	MPC · JPL
871571	2017 SL_{167}	—	November 27, 2013	Haleakala	Pan-STARRS 1	·	690 m	MPC · JPL
871572	2017 SS_{172}	—	October 20, 2007	Mount Lemmon	Mount Lemmon Survey	·	1.3 km	MPC · JPL
871573	2017 SE_{173}	—	October 2, 2010	Mount Lemmon	Mount Lemmon Survey	·	630 m	MPC · JPL
871574	2017 SS_{175}	—	September 24, 2017	Haleakala	Pan-STARRS 1	·	810 m	MPC · JPL
871575	2017 SP_{176}	—	June 18, 2015	Haleakala	Pan-STARRS 1	·	2.4 km	MPC · JPL
871576	2017 SY_{179}	—	September 24, 2017	Haleakala	Pan-STARRS 1	·	860 m	MPC · JPL
871577	2017 SQ_{180}	—	May 20, 2015	Cerro Tololo	DECam	·	1.6 km	MPC · JPL
871578	2017 SC_{181}	—	November 28, 2013	Mount Lemmon	Mount Lemmon Survey	·	1.2 km	MPC · JPL
871579	2017 SY_{182}	—	September 25, 2017	Haleakala	Pan-STARRS 1	·	1.7 km	MPC · JPL
871580	2017 SN_{192}	—	September 30, 2017	Haleakala	Pan-STARRS 1	·	880 m	MPC · JPL
871581	2017 SQ_{194}	—	October 28, 2014	Haleakala	Pan-STARRS 1	·	670 m	MPC · JPL
871582	2017 SX_{196}	—	September 26, 2017	Haleakala	Pan-STARRS 1	·	1.3 km	MPC · JPL
871583	2017 SB_{197}	—	May 20, 2015	Cerro Tololo	DECam	·	1.1 km	MPC · JPL
871584	2017 SO_{200}	—	September 17, 2017	Haleakala	Pan-STARRS 1	·	770 m	MPC · JPL
871585	2017 SD_{201}	—	September 17, 2017	Haleakala	Pan-STARRS 1	·	490 m	MPC · JPL
871586	2017 SO_{201}	—	September 18, 2017	Haleakala	Pan-STARRS 1	·	880 m	MPC · JPL
871587	2017 SG_{202}	—	September 27, 2017	Mount Lemmon	Mount Lemmon Survey	·	1.1 km	MPC · JPL
871588	2017 SH_{202}	—	September 30, 2017	Haleakala	Pan-STARRS 1	·	900 m	MPC · JPL
871589	2017 SV_{202}	—	September 24, 2017	Mount Lemmon	Mount Lemmon Survey	·	1.5 km	MPC · JPL
871590	2017 SD_{203}	—	September 16, 2017	Haleakala	Pan-STARRS 1	·	1.5 km	MPC · JPL
871591	2017 SF_{203}	—	November 21, 2003	Kitt Peak	Deep Ecliptic Survey	KOR	830 m	MPC · JPL
871592	2017 SQ_{203}	—	September 22, 2017	Haleakala	Pan-STARRS 1	·	1.1 km	MPC · JPL
871593	2017 SJ_{204}	—	September 18, 2017	Haleakala	Pan-STARRS 1	·	1.0 km	MPC · JPL
871594	2017 SX_{204}	—	September 24, 2017	Haleakala	Pan-STARRS 1	·	760 m	MPC · JPL
871595	2017 SN_{205}	—	September 27, 2017	Haleakala	Pan-STARRS 1	WIT	680 m	MPC · JPL
871596	2017 SR_{205}	—	September 19, 2017	Haleakala	Pan-STARRS 1	·	1.1 km	MPC · JPL
871597	2017 SE_{206}	—	September 25, 2017	Haleakala	Pan-STARRS 1	·	1.4 km	MPC · JPL
871598	2017 SF_{206}	—	September 18, 2017	Haleakala	Pan-STARRS 1	·	1.4 km	MPC · JPL
871599	2017 SN_{206}	—	September 24, 2017	Mount Lemmon	Mount Lemmon Survey	·	950 m	MPC · JPL
871600	2017 SP_{206}	—	September 18, 2017	Haleakala	Pan-STARRS 1	·	800 m	MPC · JPL

== 871601–871700 ==
back to top

Designation			Discovery			Properties		Ref
Permanent	Provisional	Named after	Date	Site	Discoverer(s)	Category	Diam.	Ref
871601	2017 SE_{207}	—	September 16, 2017	Haleakala	Pan-STARRS 1	·	680 m	MPC · JPL
871602	2017 SF_{207}	—	September 22, 2017	Haleakala	Pan-STARRS 1	·	830 m	MPC · JPL
871603	2017 SR_{207}	—	September 18, 2017	Haleakala	Pan-STARRS 1	·	1.3 km	MPC · JPL
871604	2017 SW_{207}	—	September 24, 2017	Mount Lemmon	Mount Lemmon Survey	H	400 m	MPC · JPL
871605	2017 SY_{207}	—	September 26, 2017	Haleakala	Pan-STARRS 1	·	770 m	MPC · JPL
871606	2017 SE_{208}	—	September 24, 2017	Haleakala	Pan-STARRS 1	·	1.4 km	MPC · JPL
871607	2017 SF_{208}	—	September 30, 2017	Haleakala	Pan-STARRS 1	·	870 m	MPC · JPL
871608	2017 SG_{208}	—	September 26, 2017	Haleakala	Pan-STARRS 1	BRA	990 m	MPC · JPL
871609	2017 SD_{210}	—	September 25, 2017	Haleakala	Pan-STARRS 1	·	1.1 km	MPC · JPL
871610	2017 SM_{213}	—	September 30, 2017	Mount Lemmon	Mount Lemmon Survey	·	2.0 km	MPC · JPL
871611	2017 SG_{216}	—	November 9, 2013	Haleakala	Pan-STARRS 1	·	680 m	MPC · JPL
871612	2017 SJ_{216}	—	September 5, 2008	Kitt Peak	Spacewatch	·	940 m	MPC · JPL
871613	2017 SY_{219}	—	September 25, 2017	Haleakala	Pan-STARRS 1	·	760 m	MPC · JPL
871614	2017 SZ_{219}	—	September 23, 2017	Haleakala	Pan-STARRS 1	·	700 m	MPC · JPL
871615	2017 SH_{220}	—	September 30, 2017	Haleakala	Pan-STARRS 1	·	2.7 km	MPC · JPL
871616	2017 SY_{223}	—	September 25, 2017	Haleakala	Pan-STARRS 1	·	1.3 km	MPC · JPL
871617	2017 SJ_{224}	—	September 17, 2017	Haleakala	Pan-STARRS 1	KOR	1.0 km	MPC · JPL
871618	2017 SM_{224}	—	September 19, 2017	Haleakala	Pan-STARRS 1	·	890 m	MPC · JPL
871619	2017 SQ_{224}	—	September 26, 2017	Haleakala	Pan-STARRS 1	HYG	2.0 km	MPC · JPL
871620	2017 SV_{225}	—	May 1, 2016	Cerro Tololo	DECam	·	530 m	MPC · JPL
871621	2017 SQ_{226}	—	September 24, 2017	Haleakala	Pan-STARRS 1	·	1.3 km	MPC · JPL
871622	2017 SR_{226}	—	September 24, 2017	Haleakala	Pan-STARRS 1	·	1.1 km	MPC · JPL
871623	2017 SX_{226}	—	September 25, 2017	Haleakala	Pan-STARRS 1	·	900 m	MPC · JPL
871624	2017 SG_{228}	—	September 23, 2017	Haleakala	Pan-STARRS 1	WIT	690 m	MPC · JPL
871625	2017 SL_{233}	—	September 17, 2017	Haleakala	Pan-STARRS 1	·	1.2 km	MPC · JPL
871626	2017 SR_{233}	—	February 25, 2014	Oukaïmeden	M. Ory	·	2.2 km	MPC · JPL
871627	2017 SZ_{235}	—	September 27, 2017	Mount Lemmon	Mount Lemmon Survey	·	2.1 km	MPC · JPL
871628	2017 SW_{236}	—	September 24, 2017	Haleakala	Pan-STARRS 1	·	770 m	MPC · JPL
871629	2017 SY_{241}	—	September 16, 2017	Haleakala	Pan-STARRS 1	·	2.4 km	MPC · JPL
871630	2017 SD_{242}	—	September 25, 2017	Haleakala	Pan-STARRS 1	·	2.0 km	MPC · JPL
871631	2017 SF_{242}	—	September 29, 2017	Haleakala	Pan-STARRS 1	VER	2.2 km	MPC · JPL
871632	2017 SP_{242}	—	September 22, 2017	Haleakala	Pan-STARRS 1	·	1.3 km	MPC · JPL
871633	2017 SS_{242}	—	September 19, 2017	Haleakala	Pan-STARRS 1	·	1.3 km	MPC · JPL
871634	2017 SU_{243}	—	September 21, 2017	Haleakala	Pan-STARRS 1	·	890 m	MPC · JPL
871635	2017 SM_{247}	—	September 23, 2017	Haleakala	Pan-STARRS 1	THM	1.4 km	MPC · JPL
871636	2017 SY_{247}	—	September 30, 2017	Haleakala	Pan-STARRS 1	EOS	1.1 km	MPC · JPL
871637	2017 SQ_{249}	—	September 19, 2017	Haleakala	Pan-STARRS 1	·	370 m	MPC · JPL
871638	2017 ST_{249}	—	September 17, 2017	Haleakala	Pan-STARRS 1	·	2.1 km	MPC · JPL
871639	2017 SC_{251}	—	September 24, 2017	Haleakala	Pan-STARRS 1	·	2.0 km	MPC · JPL
871640	2017 SQ_{252}	—	September 16, 2017	Haleakala	Pan-STARRS 1	·	1.7 km	MPC · JPL
871641	2017 SB_{253}	—	September 17, 2017	Haleakala	Pan-STARRS 1	·	1.8 km	MPC · JPL
871642	2017 SX_{253}	—	September 23, 2017	Haleakala	Pan-STARRS 1	THM	1.5 km	MPC · JPL
871643	2017 SY_{256}	—	April 18, 2015	Cerro Tololo	DECam	·	1.8 km	MPC · JPL
871644	2017 SC_{257}	—	September 21, 2017	Haleakala	Pan-STARRS 1	·	2.1 km	MPC · JPL
871645	2017 SP_{257}	—	September 25, 2017	Haleakala	Pan-STARRS 1	·	800 m	MPC · JPL
871646	2017 SN_{258}	—	September 24, 2017	Haleakala	Pan-STARRS 1	KOR	860 m	MPC · JPL
871647	2017 SH_{263}	—	September 19, 2017	Haleakala	Pan-STARRS 1	·	1.5 km	MPC · JPL
871648	2017 SG_{267}	—	September 17, 2017	Haleakala	Pan-STARRS 1	·	890 m	MPC · JPL
871649	2017 SG_{271}	—	September 22, 2017	Haleakala	Pan-STARRS 1	·	660 m	MPC · JPL
871650	2017 SN_{273}	—	September 17, 2017	Haleakala	Pan-STARRS 1	·	560 m	MPC · JPL
871651	2017 SO_{273}	—	September 30, 2017	Mount Lemmon	Mount Lemmon Survey	·	760 m	MPC · JPL
871652	2017 SQ_{277}	—	September 14, 2013	Haleakala	Pan-STARRS 1	·	850 m	MPC · JPL
871653	2017 SK_{280}	—	September 21, 2017	Haleakala	Pan-STARRS 1	·	760 m	MPC · JPL
871654	2017 SG_{281}	—	April 27, 2012	Haleakala	Pan-STARRS 1	·	680 m	MPC · JPL
871655	2017 SH_{281}	—	September 21, 2017	Haleakala	Pan-STARRS 1	·	750 m	MPC · JPL
871656	2017 SB_{283}	—	September 29, 2017	Haleakala	Pan-STARRS 1	·	710 m	MPC · JPL
871657	2017 SS_{283}	—	September 23, 2017	Haleakala	Pan-STARRS 1	HNS	630 m	MPC · JPL
871658	2017 SZ_{283}	—	September 23, 2017	Haleakala	Pan-STARRS 1	EUN	510 m	MPC · JPL
871659	2017 SA_{284}	—	May 1, 2016	Haleakala	Pan-STARRS 1	·	770 m	MPC · JPL
871660	2017 SN_{285}	—	January 24, 2015	Haleakala	Pan-STARRS 1	·	870 m	MPC · JPL
871661	2017 SZ_{289}	—	September 19, 2017	Haleakala	Pan-STARRS 1	·	800 m	MPC · JPL
871662	2017 SL_{292}	—	September 22, 2017	Haleakala	Pan-STARRS 1	·	650 m	MPC · JPL
871663	2017 SL_{295}	—	September 22, 2017	Haleakala	Pan-STARRS 1	·	1.9 km	MPC · JPL
871664	2017 SS_{296}	—	May 15, 2015	Haleakala	Pan-STARRS 1	·	2.4 km	MPC · JPL
871665	2017 SO_{306}	—	October 5, 2013	Haleakala	Pan-STARRS 1	·	780 m	MPC · JPL
871666	2017 SA_{307}	—	September 22, 2017	Haleakala	Pan-STARRS 1	HNS	860 m	MPC · JPL
871667	2017 SP_{307}	—	September 21, 2017	Haleakala	Pan-STARRS 1	·	620 m	MPC · JPL
871668	2017 SG_{327}	—	September 25, 2017	Haleakala	Pan-STARRS 1	·	1.8 km	MPC · JPL
871669	2017 SG_{338}	—	September 21, 2017	Haleakala	Pan-STARRS 1	·	1.5 km	MPC · JPL
871670	2017 SA_{404}	—	September 26, 2017	Haleakala	Pan-STARRS 1	H	320 m	MPC · JPL
871671	2017 TE	—	October 1, 2017	Mount Lemmon	Mount Lemmon Survey	H	380 m	MPC · JPL
871672	2017 TQ_{1}	—	September 25, 2017	Catalina	CSS	·	1.1 km	MPC · JPL
871673	2017 TB_{3}	—	September 21, 2004	Socorro	LINEAR	H	430 m	MPC · JPL
871674	2017 TJ_{3}	—	May 25, 2009	Kitt Peak	Spacewatch	H	320 m	MPC · JPL
871675	2017 TJ_{5}	—	July 1, 2014	Haleakala	Pan-STARRS 1	H	340 m	MPC · JPL
871676	2017 TM_{12}	—	December 4, 2013	Piszkés-tető	K. Sárneczky, P. Székely	·	1.2 km	MPC · JPL
871677	2017 TS_{13}	—	May 20, 2015	Cerro Tololo	DECam	·	2.1 km	MPC · JPL
871678	2017 TE_{14}	—	October 15, 2017	Mount Lemmon	Mount Lemmon Survey	·	430 m	MPC · JPL
871679	2017 TS_{14}	—	October 12, 2017	Mount Lemmon	Mount Lemmon Survey	H	420 m	MPC · JPL
871680	2017 TR_{15}	—	September 22, 2017	Haleakala	Pan-STARRS 1	·	1.2 km	MPC · JPL
871681	2017 TL_{18}	—	October 15, 2017	Mount Lemmon	Mount Lemmon Survey	·	810 m	MPC · JPL
871682	2017 TN_{18}	—	October 11, 2017	Mount Lemmon	Mount Lemmon Survey	H	460 m	MPC · JPL
871683	2017 TN_{19}	—	October 11, 2017	Mount Lemmon	Mount Lemmon Survey	·	1.0 km	MPC · JPL
871684	2017 TO_{19}	—	March 3, 2016	Haleakala	Pan-STARRS 1	H	380 m	MPC · JPL
871685	2017 TX_{20}	—	October 3, 2017	Mount Lemmon	Mount Lemmon Survey	H	370 m	MPC · JPL
871686	2017 TK_{22}	—	May 20, 2015	Cerro Tololo	DECam	THM	1.4 km	MPC · JPL
871687	2017 TF_{23}	—	October 1, 2017	Haleakala	Pan-STARRS 1	H	380 m	MPC · JPL
871688	2017 TR_{26}	—	October 1, 2017	Haleakala	Pan-STARRS 1	·	1.5 km	MPC · JPL
871689	2017 TZ_{27}	—	October 14, 2017	Mount Lemmon	Mount Lemmon Survey	EUN	1.1 km	MPC · JPL
871690	2017 TX_{29}	—	October 11, 2017	Haleakala	Pan-STARRS 1	·	890 m	MPC · JPL
871691	2017 TN_{30}	—	October 15, 2017	Mount Lemmon	Mount Lemmon Survey	V	550 m	MPC · JPL
871692	2017 TN_{35}	—	October 12, 2017	Mount Lemmon	Mount Lemmon Survey	KON	1.5 km	MPC · JPL
871693	2017 TA_{39}	—	October 15, 2017	Mount Lemmon	Mount Lemmon Survey	·	830 m	MPC · JPL
871694	2017 TV_{42}	—	October 15, 2017	Mount Lemmon	Mount Lemmon Survey	·	790 m	MPC · JPL
871695	2017 TE_{53}	—	October 3, 2017	Mount Lemmon	Mount Lemmon Survey	H	390 m	MPC · JPL
871696	2017 UG_{7}	—	September 24, 2017	Haleakala	Pan-STARRS 1	H	390 m	MPC · JPL
871697	2017 UC_{8}	—	July 11, 2016	Haleakala	Pan-STARRS 1	·	1.4 km	MPC · JPL
871698	2017 UT_{8}	—	January 7, 2014	Mount Lemmon	Mount Lemmon Survey	·	1.2 km	MPC · JPL
871699	2017 UB_{11}	—	September 15, 2007	Mount Lemmon	Mount Lemmon Survey	·	440 m	MPC · JPL
871700	2017 UT_{11}	—	November 28, 2013	Mount Lemmon	Mount Lemmon Survey	·	930 m	MPC · JPL

== 871701–871800 ==
back to top

Designation			Discovery			Properties		Ref
Permanent	Provisional	Named after	Date	Site	Discoverer(s)	Category	Diam.	Ref
871701	2017 UY_{11}	—	October 10, 2008	Mount Lemmon	Mount Lemmon Survey	·	1.4 km	MPC · JPL
871702	2017 UN_{14}	—	November 13, 2007	Kitt Peak	Spacewatch	(2076)	470 m	MPC · JPL
871703	2017 UO_{14}	—	August 7, 2008	Kitt Peak	Spacewatch	·	1.2 km	MPC · JPL
871704	2017 UA_{16}	—	August 16, 2009	Kitt Peak	Spacewatch	T_{j} (2.99) · 3:2	4.0 km	MPC · JPL
871705	2017 UE_{22}	—	November 2, 2013	Catalina	CSS	·	1.1 km	MPC · JPL
871706	2017 UW_{24}	—	November 18, 2007	Kitt Peak	Spacewatch	·	1.8 km	MPC · JPL
871707	2017 UT_{29}	—	April 23, 2015	Haleakala	Pan-STARRS 1	3:2 · SHU	4.2 km	MPC · JPL
871708	2017 UU_{35}	—	September 24, 2000	Kitt Peak	Spacewatch	·	750 m	MPC · JPL
871709	2017 UB_{39}	—	December 7, 2013	Haleakala	Pan-STARRS 1	·	1.0 km	MPC · JPL
871710	2017 UY_{41}	—	October 28, 2017	Haleakala	Pan-STARRS 1	·	590 m	MPC · JPL
871711	2017 UA_{44}	—	October 2, 2017	Mount Lemmon	Mount Lemmon Survey	H	450 m	MPC · JPL
871712	2017 UH_{45}	—	November 15, 2012	Mount Lemmon	Mount Lemmon Survey	·	1.9 km	MPC · JPL
871713	2017 UT_{48}	—	September 5, 2011	Haleakala	Pan-STARRS 1	·	1.9 km	MPC · JPL
871714	2017 UH_{52}	—	March 12, 2014	Haleakala	Pan-STARRS 1	·	1.2 km	MPC · JPL
871715	2017 UU_{52}	—	May 20, 2015	Cerro Tololo	DECam	·	1.1 km	MPC · JPL
871716	2017 UK_{53}	—	October 29, 2017	Haleakala	Pan-STARRS 1	·	1.0 km	MPC · JPL
871717	2017 UG_{54}	—	October 30, 2017	Haleakala	Pan-STARRS 1	·	1.3 km	MPC · JPL
871718	2017 UG_{55}	—	October 18, 2017	GINOP-KHK, Piszkes	K. Sárneczky	·	730 m	MPC · JPL
871719	2017 UM_{57}	—	October 28, 2017	Haleakala	Pan-STARRS 1	·	540 m	MPC · JPL
871720	2017 UA_{58}	—	October 28, 2017	Mount Lemmon	Mount Lemmon Survey	·	1.2 km	MPC · JPL
871721	2017 UT_{60}	—	April 19, 2015	Cerro Tololo	DECam	·	1.9 km	MPC · JPL
871722	2017 UC_{61}	—	September 17, 2006	Catalina	CSS	·	1.9 km	MPC · JPL
871723	2017 UH_{62}	—	October 22, 2017	Mount Lemmon	Mount Lemmon Survey	·	980 m	MPC · JPL
871724	2017 UP_{63}	—	October 22, 2017	Mount Lemmon	Mount Lemmon Survey	·	940 m	MPC · JPL
871725	2017 UU_{64}	—	October 30, 2017	Haleakala	Pan-STARRS 1	EUN	890 m	MPC · JPL
871726	2017 UD_{65}	—	October 28, 2017	Mount Lemmon	Mount Lemmon Survey	·	760 m	MPC · JPL
871727	2017 UQ_{65}	—	October 20, 2017	Mount Lemmon	Mount Lemmon Survey	·	860 m	MPC · JPL
871728	2017 UR_{66}	—	October 29, 2017	Haleakala	Pan-STARRS 1	·	480 m	MPC · JPL
871729	2017 UB_{67}	—	October 28, 2017	Haleakala	Pan-STARRS 1	KON	1.8 km	MPC · JPL
871730	2017 UF_{69}	—	June 15, 2015	Haleakala	Pan-STARRS 1	·	2.5 km	MPC · JPL
871731	2017 UJ_{70}	—	October 28, 2017	Mount Lemmon	Mount Lemmon Survey	·	1.1 km	MPC · JPL
871732	2017 UG_{71}	—	September 20, 2011	Haleakala	Pan-STARRS 1	·	1.7 km	MPC · JPL
871733	2017 UU_{74}	—	October 23, 2017	Mount Lemmon	Mount Lemmon Survey	·	1.2 km	MPC · JPL
871734	2017 UL_{75}	—	October 22, 2017	Mount Lemmon	Mount Lemmon Survey	·	1.7 km	MPC · JPL
871735	2017 UM_{76}	—	May 21, 2015	Cerro Tololo	DECam	·	1.2 km	MPC · JPL
871736	2017 UO_{76}	—	October 28, 2017	Haleakala	Pan-STARRS 1	EUN	930 m	MPC · JPL
871737	2017 US_{77}	—	October 21, 2017	Mount Lemmon	Mount Lemmon Survey	(5)	970 m	MPC · JPL
871738	2017 UX_{77}	—	November 24, 2008	Kitt Peak	Spacewatch	·	1.5 km	MPC · JPL
871739	2017 US_{79}	—	April 18, 2015	Cerro Tololo	DECam	·	900 m	MPC · JPL
871740	2017 UA_{81}	—	April 18, 2015	Cerro Tololo	DECam	·	870 m	MPC · JPL
871741	2017 UE_{82}	—	October 22, 2006	Mount Lemmon	Mount Lemmon Survey	·	2.3 km	MPC · JPL
871742	2017 UQ_{82}	—	December 3, 2012	Mount Lemmon	Mount Lemmon Survey	EOS	1.1 km	MPC · JPL
871743	2017 UB_{83}	—	October 28, 2017	Haleakala	Pan-STARRS 1	HNS	770 m	MPC · JPL
871744	2017 UR_{83}	—	May 20, 2015	Cerro Tololo	DECam	EUN	840 m	MPC · JPL
871745	2017 UD_{85}	—	October 27, 2017	Mount Lemmon	Mount Lemmon Survey	·	550 m	MPC · JPL
871746	2017 UD_{87}	—	November 19, 2008	Mount Lemmon	Mount Lemmon Survey	·	1.7 km	MPC · JPL
871747	2017 UJ_{87}	—	May 19, 2015	Cerro Tololo	DECam	·	1.3 km	MPC · JPL
871748	2017 UJ_{88}	—	October 20, 2017	Mount Lemmon	Mount Lemmon Survey	·	890 m	MPC · JPL
871749	2017 UZ_{88}	—	October 30, 2017	Haleakala	Pan-STARRS 1	·	1.3 km	MPC · JPL
871750	2017 UB_{89}	—	January 15, 2009	Kitt Peak	Spacewatch	·	1.1 km	MPC · JPL
871751	2017 UU_{90}	—	November 24, 2008	Kitt Peak	Spacewatch	·	1.3 km	MPC · JPL
871752	2017 UW_{90}	—	October 27, 2017	Haleakala	Pan-STARRS 1	·	1.1 km	MPC · JPL
871753	2017 UY_{90}	—	October 21, 2017	Mount Lemmon	Mount Lemmon Survey	·	600 m	MPC · JPL
871754	2017 UT_{92}	—	October 15, 2017	Mount Lemmon	Mount Lemmon Survey	·	470 m	MPC · JPL
871755	2017 UQ_{94}	—	October 20, 2017	Mount Lemmon	Mount Lemmon Survey	·	1.6 km	MPC · JPL
871756	2017 UT_{94}	—	October 30, 2017	Haleakala	Pan-STARRS 1	·	810 m	MPC · JPL
871757	2017 UY_{98}	—	October 28, 2017	Haleakala	Pan-STARRS 1	·	530 m	MPC · JPL
871758	2017 UZ_{98}	—	October 22, 2017	Mount Lemmon	Mount Lemmon Survey	·	910 m	MPC · JPL
871759	2017 UL_{99}	—	September 22, 2017	Haleakala	Pan-STARRS 1	·	1.0 km	MPC · JPL
871760	2017 UR_{101}	—	October 16, 2017	Mount Lemmon	Mount Lemmon Survey	·	970 m	MPC · JPL
871761	2017 US_{101}	—	October 28, 2017	Haleakala	Pan-STARRS 1	·	1.3 km	MPC · JPL
871762	2017 UU_{101}	—	October 29, 2017	Haleakala	Pan-STARRS 1	HNS	720 m	MPC · JPL
871763	2017 UZ_{101}	—	October 28, 2017	Mount Lemmon	Mount Lemmon Survey	·	910 m	MPC · JPL
871764	2017 UK_{102}	—	October 22, 2017	Mount Lemmon	Mount Lemmon Survey	·	400 m	MPC · JPL
871765	2017 UL_{102}	—	October 28, 2017	Haleakala	Pan-STARRS 1	·	470 m	MPC · JPL
871766	2017 UP_{102}	—	April 30, 2016	Haleakala	Pan-STARRS 1	·	780 m	MPC · JPL
871767	2017 UC_{103}	—	May 21, 2015	Haleakala	Pan-STARRS 1	EOS	1.1 km	MPC · JPL
871768	2017 UM_{104}	—	October 30, 2017	Haleakala	Pan-STARRS 1	·	820 m	MPC · JPL
871769	2017 UX_{104}	—	October 28, 2017	Haleakala	Pan-STARRS 1	·	1.2 km	MPC · JPL
871770	2017 UW_{105}	—	October 27, 2017	Haleakala	Pan-STARRS 1	·	1.3 km	MPC · JPL
871771	2017 UY_{105}	—	October 18, 2017	Mount Lemmon	Mount Lemmon Survey	·	1.7 km	MPC · JPL
871772	2017 UA_{106}	—	October 30, 2017	Haleakala	Pan-STARRS 1	·	1.2 km	MPC · JPL
871773	2017 UP_{106}	—	October 30, 2017	Haleakala	Pan-STARRS 1	·	860 m	MPC · JPL
871774	2017 UE_{108}	—	October 21, 2017	Mount Lemmon	Mount Lemmon Survey	·	1.1 km	MPC · JPL
871775	2017 UY_{108}	—	October 30, 2017	Haleakala	Pan-STARRS 1	(5)	810 m	MPC · JPL
871776	2017 UT_{109}	—	October 30, 2017	Haleakala	Pan-STARRS 1	·	1.2 km	MPC · JPL
871777	2017 UX_{109}	—	October 29, 2017	Haleakala	Pan-STARRS 1	HNS	980 m	MPC · JPL
871778	2017 UC_{110}	—	October 30, 2017	Haleakala	Pan-STARRS 1	·	1.1 km	MPC · JPL
871779	2017 UP_{113}	—	October 23, 2017	Mount Lemmon	Mount Lemmon Survey	·	450 m	MPC · JPL
871780	2017 UR_{113}	—	October 28, 2017	Haleakala	Pan-STARRS 1	(5)	890 m	MPC · JPL
871781	2017 UD_{114}	—	October 28, 2017	Haleakala	Pan-STARRS 1	·	690 m	MPC · JPL
871782	2017 UE_{114}	—	October 30, 2017	Haleakala	Pan-STARRS 1	·	800 m	MPC · JPL
871783	2017 UX_{114}	—	April 18, 2015	Cerro Tololo	DECam	·	1.3 km	MPC · JPL
871784	2017 UT_{115}	—	October 29, 2017	Mount Lemmon	Mount Lemmon Survey	MAR	810 m	MPC · JPL
871785	2017 UN_{116}	—	October 28, 2017	Mount Lemmon	Mount Lemmon Survey	BAR	870 m	MPC · JPL
871786	2017 US_{120}	—	October 27, 2017	Haleakala	Pan-STARRS 1	·	450 m	MPC · JPL
871787	2017 UE_{121}	—	October 28, 2017	Mount Lemmon	Mount Lemmon Survey	·	1.2 km	MPC · JPL
871788	2017 UX_{121}	—	October 21, 2017	Mount Lemmon	Mount Lemmon Survey	·	1.1 km	MPC · JPL
871789	2017 UY_{121}	—	October 21, 2017	Mount Lemmon	Mount Lemmon Survey	·	560 m	MPC · JPL
871790	2017 UJ_{122}	—	October 28, 2017	Haleakala	Pan-STARRS 1	·	800 m	MPC · JPL
871791	2017 UM_{122}	—	October 29, 2017	Haleakala	Pan-STARRS 1	MAR	790 m	MPC · JPL
871792	2017 UO_{122}	—	April 12, 2016	Haleakala	Pan-STARRS 1	·	780 m	MPC · JPL
871793	2017 UF_{131}	—	October 30, 2017	Haleakala	Pan-STARRS 1	·	1.0 km	MPC · JPL
871794	2017 UN_{132}	—	October 27, 2017	Haleakala	Pan-STARRS 1	·	1.3 km	MPC · JPL
871795	2017 UP_{132}	—	October 27, 2017	Haleakala	Pan-STARRS 1	·	950 m	MPC · JPL
871796	2017 UY_{132}	—	October 21, 2017	Mount Lemmon	Mount Lemmon Survey	·	910 m	MPC · JPL
871797	2017 UN_{133}	—	October 27, 2017	Mount Lemmon	Mount Lemmon Survey	·	900 m	MPC · JPL
871798	2017 UY_{133}	—	October 27, 2017	Haleakala	Pan-STARRS 1	·	960 m	MPC · JPL
871799	2017 UX_{135}	—	October 22, 2017	Haleakala	Pan-STARRS 1	H	330 m	MPC · JPL
871800	2017 UC_{141}	—	April 30, 2016	Haleakala	Pan-STARRS 1	·	640 m	MPC · JPL

== 871801–871900 ==
back to top

Designation			Discovery			Properties		Ref
Permanent	Provisional	Named after	Date	Site	Discoverer(s)	Category	Diam.	Ref
871801	2017 UZ_{145}	—	October 30, 2017	Haleakala	Pan-STARRS 1	·	1.0 km	MPC · JPL
871802	2017 UF_{157}	—	October 17, 2017	Mount Lemmon	Mount Lemmon Survey	MAR	650 m	MPC · JPL
871803	2017 UC_{158}	—	May 3, 2016	Cerro Tololo	DECam	(5)	660 m	MPC · JPL
871804	2017 UY_{158}	—	October 29, 2017	Haleakala	Pan-STARRS 1	·	1.2 km	MPC · JPL
871805	2017 UW_{161}	—	October 22, 2017	Mount Lemmon	Mount Lemmon Survey	·	840 m	MPC · JPL
871806	2017 UZ_{161}	—	April 18, 2015	Cerro Tololo	DECam	·	1.2 km	MPC · JPL
871807	2017 UN_{162}	—	October 30, 2017	Haleakala	Pan-STARRS 1	·	1.1 km	MPC · JPL
871808	2017 US_{162}	—	April 21, 2015	Cerro Tololo	DECam	(29841)	870 m	MPC · JPL
871809	2017 UZ_{162}	—	October 25, 2017	Mount Lemmon	Mount Lemmon Survey	·	840 m	MPC · JPL
871810	2017 US_{163}	—	October 30, 2017	Haleakala	Pan-STARRS 1	·	1.1 km	MPC · JPL
871811	2017 US_{166}	—	October 28, 2017	Haleakala	Pan-STARRS 1	(5)	930 m	MPC · JPL
871812	2017 UD_{167}	—	October 30, 2017	Haleakala	Pan-STARRS 1	(5)	810 m	MPC · JPL
871813	2017 UV_{167}	—	October 28, 2017	Haleakala	Pan-STARRS 1	·	950 m	MPC · JPL
871814	2017 UY_{167}	—	January 23, 2015	Haleakala	Pan-STARRS 1	EUN	910 m	MPC · JPL
871815	2017 UZ_{168}	—	October 28, 2017	Haleakala	Pan-STARRS 1	·	880 m	MPC · JPL
871816	2017 UP_{170}	—	October 22, 2017	Haleakala	Pan-STARRS 1	H	300 m	MPC · JPL
871817	2017 UQ_{171}	—	October 27, 2017	Mount Lemmon	Mount Lemmon Survey	·	740 m	MPC · JPL
871818	2017 UM_{173}	—	April 18, 2015	Haleakala	Pan-STARRS 1	·	1.2 km	MPC · JPL
871819	2017 UR_{173}	—	October 27, 2017	Haleakala	Pan-STARRS 1	·	1.0 km	MPC · JPL
871820	2017 UZ_{174}	—	October 22, 2017	Haleakala	Pan-STARRS 1	·	850 m	MPC · JPL
871821	2017 UT_{176}	—	April 19, 2015	Cerro Tololo	DECam	·	970 m	MPC · JPL
871822	2017 UR_{177}	—	April 21, 2015	Cerro Tololo	DECam	·	870 m	MPC · JPL
871823	2017 UB_{178}	—	October 30, 2017	Haleakala	Pan-STARRS 1	·	1.1 km	MPC · JPL
871824	2017 UG_{181}	—	April 15, 2015	Mount Lemmon	Mount Lemmon Survey	·	860 m	MPC · JPL
871825	2017 UG_{182}	—	October 27, 2017	Mount Lemmon	Mount Lemmon Survey	·	860 m	MPC · JPL
871826	2017 US_{182}	—	October 28, 2017	Mount Lemmon	Mount Lemmon Survey	·	1.0 km	MPC · JPL
871827	2017 UW_{183}	—	October 9, 2008	Mount Lemmon	Mount Lemmon Survey	·	840 m	MPC · JPL
871828	2017 VM_{1}	—	January 17, 2005	Kitt Peak	Spacewatch	H	350 m	MPC · JPL
871829	2017 VS_{1}	—	November 10, 2017	Haleakala	Pan-STARRS 1	H	450 m	MPC · JPL
871830	2017 VC_{3}	—	August 16, 2009	Kitt Peak	Spacewatch	MAS	570 m	MPC · JPL
871831	2017 VH_{6}	—	November 10, 2006	Kitt Peak	Spacewatch	·	2.1 km	MPC · JPL
871832	2017 VL_{8}	—	October 2, 2010	Nogales	M. Schwartz, P. R. Holvorcem	·	590 m	MPC · JPL
871833	2017 VY_{8}	—	April 27, 2012	Haleakala	Pan-STARRS 1	·	820 m	MPC · JPL
871834	2017 VG_{10}	—	November 16, 2010	Mount Lemmon	Mount Lemmon Survey	·	1.5 km	MPC · JPL
871835	2017 VZ_{15}	—	September 24, 2017	Mount Lemmon	Mount Lemmon Survey	·	960 m	MPC · JPL
871836	2017 VF_{16}	—	September 12, 2017	Haleakala	Pan-STARRS 1	H	290 m	MPC · JPL
871837	2017 VH_{17}	—	November 13, 2017	Haleakala	Pan-STARRS 1	(5)	820 m	MPC · JPL
871838	2017 VO_{17}	—	October 21, 2017	Mount Lemmon	Mount Lemmon Survey	·	970 m	MPC · JPL
871839	2017 VF_{18}	—	September 10, 2013	Haleakala	Pan-STARRS 1	·	1.1 km	MPC · JPL
871840	2017 VE_{19}	—	May 2, 2016	Mount Lemmon	Mount Lemmon Survey	·	740 m	MPC · JPL
871841	2017 VO_{23}	—	November 24, 2013	Haleakala	Pan-STARRS 1	·	1.4 km	MPC · JPL
871842	2017 VW_{27}	—	November 8, 2013	Mount Lemmon	Mount Lemmon Survey	·	560 m	MPC · JPL
871843	2017 VZ_{28}	—	October 27, 2017	Mount Lemmon	Mount Lemmon Survey	(5)	870 m	MPC · JPL
871844	2017 VA_{30}	—	November 2, 2013	Mount Lemmon	Mount Lemmon Survey	·	770 m	MPC · JPL
871845	2017 VF_{30}	—	March 23, 2015	Haleakala	Pan-STARRS 1	·	1.3 km	MPC · JPL
871846	2017 VU_{30}	—	September 14, 2007	Mount Lemmon	Mount Lemmon Survey	KOR	950 m	MPC · JPL
871847	2017 VM_{33}	—	November 25, 2006	Kitt Peak	Spacewatch	·	1.1 km	MPC · JPL
871848	2017 VT_{34}	—	November 15, 2017	Kitt Peak	Spacewatch	JUN	820 m	MPC · JPL
871849	2017 VY_{34}	—	November 15, 2017	Mount Lemmon	Mount Lemmon Survey	·	950 m	MPC · JPL
871850	2017 VE_{37}	—	November 15, 2017	Mount Lemmon	Mount Lemmon Survey	MAS	460 m	MPC · JPL
871851	2017 VD_{38}	—	September 22, 2017	Haleakala	Pan-STARRS 1	·	840 m	MPC · JPL
871852	2017 VJ_{38}	—	September 24, 2008	Mount Lemmon	Mount Lemmon Survey	·	1.1 km	MPC · JPL
871853	2017 VG_{40}	—	November 12, 2017	Mount Lemmon	Mount Lemmon Survey	·	1.2 km	MPC · JPL
871854	2017 VS_{41}	—	November 13, 2017	Mauna Loa	ATLAS	·	2.4 km	MPC · JPL
871855	2017 VJ_{43}	—	November 14, 2017	Mount Lemmon	Mount Lemmon Survey	·	1.1 km	MPC · JPL
871856	2017 VM_{43}	—	November 15, 2017	Mount Lemmon	Mount Lemmon Survey	·	1.0 km	MPC · JPL
871857	2017 VQ_{43}	—	November 14, 2017	Mount Lemmon	Mount Lemmon Survey	·	1.0 km	MPC · JPL
871858	2017 VR_{43}	—	November 10, 2017	Haleakala	Pan-STARRS 1	·	1.0 km	MPC · JPL
871859	2017 VT_{43}	—	November 13, 2017	Haleakala	Pan-STARRS 1	·	800 m	MPC · JPL
871860	2017 VX_{43}	—	November 14, 2017	Mount Lemmon	Mount Lemmon Survey	EUN	730 m	MPC · JPL
871861	2017 VQ_{44}	—	November 13, 2017	Haleakala	Pan-STARRS 1	·	570 m	MPC · JPL
871862	2017 VS_{44}	—	November 14, 2017	Mount Lemmon	Mount Lemmon Survey	·	440 m	MPC · JPL
871863	2017 VB_{45}	—	November 14, 2017	Mount Lemmon	Mount Lemmon Survey	·	730 m	MPC · JPL
871864	2017 VS_{45}	—	April 18, 2015	Cerro Tololo	DECam	·	890 m	MPC · JPL
871865	2017 VB_{47}	—	November 15, 2017	Mount Lemmon	Mount Lemmon Survey	EUN	690 m	MPC · JPL
871866	2017 VV_{47}	—	November 10, 2017	Haleakala	Pan-STARRS 1	·	680 m	MPC · JPL
871867	2017 VR_{48}	—	November 15, 2017	Mount Lemmon	Mount Lemmon Survey	·	1.2 km	MPC · JPL
871868	2017 VC_{50}	—	November 15, 2017	Mount Lemmon	Mount Lemmon Survey	·	980 m	MPC · JPL
871869	2017 VD_{50}	—	November 15, 2017	Mount Lemmon	Mount Lemmon Survey	(5)	780 m	MPC · JPL
871870	2017 VH_{50}	—	November 11, 2017	Mount Lemmon	Mount Lemmon Survey	H	410 m	MPC · JPL
871871	2017 VM_{50}	—	November 9, 2017	Haleakala	Pan-STARRS 1	·	760 m	MPC · JPL
871872	2017 VN_{51}	—	November 15, 2017	Mount Lemmon	Mount Lemmon Survey	EOS	1.2 km	MPC · JPL
871873	2017 VP_{51}	—	November 14, 2017	Mount Lemmon	Mount Lemmon Survey	·	1.9 km	MPC · JPL
871874	2017 VV_{54}	—	November 13, 2017	Haleakala	Pan-STARRS 1	·	920 m	MPC · JPL
871875	2017 VN_{55}	—	April 18, 2015	Cerro Tololo	DECam	HNS	740 m	MPC · JPL
871876	2017 VV_{55}	—	November 10, 2017	Haleakala	Pan-STARRS 1	·	1 km	MPC · JPL
871877	2017 VQ_{56}	—	November 12, 2017	Mount Lemmon	Mount Lemmon Survey	EUN	790 m	MPC · JPL
871878	2017 VY_{56}	—	May 21, 2015	Haleakala	Pan-STARRS 1	·	1.1 km	MPC · JPL
871879	2017 VA_{58}	—	January 26, 2015	Haleakala	Pan-STARRS 1	·	1.5 km	MPC · JPL
871880	2017 VM_{58}	—	May 20, 2015	Cerro Tololo	DECam	·	2.6 km	MPC · JPL
871881	2017 VY_{60}	—	November 13, 2017	Haleakala	Pan-STARRS 1	·	1.2 km	MPC · JPL
871882	2017 WT_{2}	—	October 21, 2017	Haleakala	Pan-STARRS 1	·	1.2 km	MPC · JPL
871883	2017 WD_{3}	—	December 17, 2003	Kitt Peak	Spacewatch	·	580 m	MPC · JPL
871884	2017 WA_{5}	—	April 19, 2013	Haleakala	Pan-STARRS 1	·	540 m	MPC · JPL
871885	2017 WA_{6}	—	August 3, 2016	Haleakala	Pan-STARRS 1	·	2.8 km	MPC · JPL
871886	2017 WE_{9}	—	October 20, 2017	Mount Lemmon	Mount Lemmon Survey	(5)	830 m	MPC · JPL
871887	2017 WC_{11}	—	December 4, 2013	Haleakala	Pan-STARRS 1	·	940 m	MPC · JPL
871888	2017 WQ_{11}	—	May 5, 2014	Kitt Peak	Spacewatch	H	320 m	MPC · JPL
871889	2017 WR_{16}	—	March 7, 2013	Mount Lemmon	Mount Lemmon Survey	H	380 m	MPC · JPL
871890	2017 WR_{18}	—	April 5, 2011	Kitt Peak	Spacewatch	HNS	840 m	MPC · JPL
871891	2017 WB_{20}	—	March 15, 2013	Kitt Peak	Spacewatch	H	400 m	MPC · JPL
871892	2017 WL_{23}	—	August 28, 2011	Haleakala	Pan-STARRS 1	LIX	2.7 km	MPC · JPL
871893	2017 WP_{23}	—	June 5, 2016	Haleakala	Pan-STARRS 1	·	1.9 km	MPC · JPL
871894	2017 WQ_{24}	—	September 6, 2012	Mount Lemmon	Mount Lemmon Survey	·	1.3 km	MPC · JPL
871895	2017 WF_{25}	—	January 4, 2014	Haleakala	Pan-STARRS 1	(1547)	1.1 km	MPC · JPL
871896	2017 WY_{25}	—	October 7, 2004	Socorro	LINEAR	·	1.4 km	MPC · JPL
871897	2017 WC_{27}	—	September 1, 2017	Haleakala	Pan-STARRS 1	INA	2.1 km	MPC · JPL
871898	2017 WS_{30}	—	November 24, 2017	Mount Lemmon	Mount Lemmon Survey	ADE	1.3 km	MPC · JPL
871899	2017 WW_{30}	—	November 20, 2017	Haleakala	Pan-STARRS 1	H	420 m	MPC · JPL
871900	2017 WA_{31}	—	November 20, 2017	Haleakala	Pan-STARRS 1	(5)	1.0 km	MPC · JPL

== 871901–872000 ==
back to top

Designation			Discovery			Properties		Ref
Permanent	Provisional	Named after	Date	Site	Discoverer(s)	Category	Diam.	Ref
871901	2017 WD_{32}	—	November 21, 2017	Haleakala	Pan-STARRS 1	·	890 m	MPC · JPL
871902	2017 WQ_{32}	—	November 20, 2017	Haleakala	Pan-STARRS 1	·	1.5 km	MPC · JPL
871903	2017 WK_{33}	—	November 18, 2017	Haleakala	Pan-STARRS 1	H	410 m	MPC · JPL
871904	2017 WC_{34}	—	November 16, 2017	Mount Lemmon	Mount Lemmon Survey	·	850 m	MPC · JPL
871905	2017 WP_{34}	—	November 21, 2017	Haleakala	Pan-STARRS 1	·	950 m	MPC · JPL
871906	2017 WY_{34}	—	November 21, 2017	Haleakala	Pan-STARRS 1	(1547)	790 m	MPC · JPL
871907	2017 WE_{37}	—	November 24, 2017	Haleakala	Pan-STARRS 1	·	1.1 km	MPC · JPL
871908	2017 WO_{37}	—	November 24, 2017	Haleakala	Pan-STARRS 1	·	950 m	MPC · JPL
871909	2017 WV_{37}	—	November 21, 2017	Mount Lemmon	Mount Lemmon Survey	·	780 m	MPC · JPL
871910	2017 WM_{38}	—	November 21, 2017	Haleakala	Pan-STARRS 1	JUN	770 m	MPC · JPL
871911	2017 WS_{38}	—	April 19, 2015	Cerro Tololo	DECam	·	800 m	MPC · JPL
871912	2017 WD_{39}	—	November 28, 2013	Kitt Peak	Spacewatch	·	840 m	MPC · JPL
871913	2017 WN_{40}	—	November 16, 2017	Mount Lemmon	Mount Lemmon Survey	·	1.1 km	MPC · JPL
871914	2017 WQ_{42}	—	November 24, 2017	Haleakala	Pan-STARRS 1	·	1.1 km	MPC · JPL
871915	2017 WP_{43}	—	November 21, 2017	Haleakala	Pan-STARRS 1	·	1.4 km	MPC · JPL
871916	2017 WS_{43}	—	November 21, 2017	Haleakala	Pan-STARRS 1	·	1.1 km	MPC · JPL
871917	2017 WO_{44}	—	November 17, 2017	Haleakala	Pan-STARRS 1	·	1.4 km	MPC · JPL
871918	2017 WD_{45}	—	April 19, 2015	Cerro Tololo	DECam	KON	1.7 km	MPC · JPL
871919	2017 WB_{46}	—	November 18, 2017	XuYi	PMO NEO Survey Program	·	1.3 km	MPC · JPL
871920	2017 WC_{46}	—	November 24, 2017	Haleakala	Pan-STARRS 1	·	960 m	MPC · JPL
871921	2017 WG_{46}	—	November 16, 2017	Mount Lemmon	Mount Lemmon Survey	·	1.2 km	MPC · JPL
871922	2017 WM_{46}	—	November 24, 2017	Haleakala	Pan-STARRS 1	·	1.4 km	MPC · JPL
871923	2017 WP_{46}	—	November 18, 2017	Haleakala	Pan-STARRS 1	·	1.0 km	MPC · JPL
871924	2017 WQ_{46}	—	November 24, 2017	Haleakala	Pan-STARRS 1	HNS	720 m	MPC · JPL
871925	2017 WZ_{46}	—	November 19, 2017	Haleakala	Pan-STARRS 1	·	1.5 km	MPC · JPL
871926	2017 WE_{47}	—	November 21, 2017	Haleakala	Pan-STARRS 1	·	1.3 km	MPC · JPL
871927	2017 WO_{47}	—	November 16, 2017	Mount Lemmon	Mount Lemmon Survey	·	900 m	MPC · JPL
871928	2017 WC_{48}	—	November 17, 2017	Haleakala	Pan-STARRS 1	·	910 m	MPC · JPL
871929	2017 WE_{48}	—	September 21, 2008	Kitt Peak	Spacewatch	·	1.1 km	MPC · JPL
871930	2017 WF_{49}	—	May 1, 2016	Haleakala	Pan-STARRS 1	·	480 m	MPC · JPL
871931	2017 WX_{49}	—	September 17, 2010	Mount Lemmon	Mount Lemmon Survey	·	430 m	MPC · JPL
871932	2017 WH_{50}	—	November 22, 2017	Haleakala	Pan-STARRS 1	H	480 m	MPC · JPL
871933	2017 WT_{50}	—	November 24, 2017	Haleakala	Pan-STARRS 1	·	870 m	MPC · JPL
871934	2017 WA_{52}	—	November 19, 2017	Haleakala	Pan-STARRS 1	·	950 m	MPC · JPL
871935	2017 WZ_{52}	—	November 18, 2017	Haleakala	Pan-STARRS 1	·	980 m	MPC · JPL
871936	2017 WW_{54}	—	November 16, 2017	Mount Lemmon	Mount Lemmon Survey	·	700 m	MPC · JPL
871937	2017 WM_{58}	—	November 18, 2017	Haleakala	Pan-STARRS 1	ADE	1.2 km	MPC · JPL
871938	2017 WN_{58}	—	November 18, 2017	Haleakala	Pan-STARRS 1	·	950 m	MPC · JPL
871939	2017 WR_{58}	—	November 25, 2017	Mount Lemmon	Mount Lemmon Survey	·	970 m	MPC · JPL
871940	2017 WF_{59}	—	November 24, 2017	Mount Lemmon	Mount Lemmon Survey	·	910 m	MPC · JPL
871941	2017 WN_{59}	—	November 18, 2017	Haleakala	Pan-STARRS 1	HNS	830 m	MPC · JPL
871942	2017 WM_{60}	—	November 27, 2017	Mount Lemmon	Mount Lemmon Survey	MAR	740 m	MPC · JPL
871943	2017 WE_{61}	—	November 21, 2017	Haleakala	Pan-STARRS 1	·	1.1 km	MPC · JPL
871944	2017 WK_{61}	—	April 18, 2015	Cerro Tololo	DECam	·	1.9 km	MPC · JPL
871945	2017 WQ_{62}	—	November 16, 2017	Mount Lemmon	Mount Lemmon Survey	·	1.7 km	MPC · JPL
871946	2017 WA_{64}	—	November 16, 2017	Mount Lemmon	Mount Lemmon Survey	·	870 m	MPC · JPL
871947	2017 WK_{68}	—	November 24, 2017	Haleakala	Pan-STARRS 1	·	1.2 km	MPC · JPL
871948	2017 WQ_{68}	—	November 21, 2017	Mount Lemmon	Mount Lemmon Survey	(5)	860 m	MPC · JPL
871949	2017 WS_{68}	—	November 18, 2017	Haleakala	Pan-STARRS 1	PHO	560 m	MPC · JPL
871950	2017 WR_{70}	—	August 24, 2008	Kitt Peak	Spacewatch	MAR	560 m	MPC · JPL
871951	2017 WC_{71}	—	November 16, 2017	Mount Lemmon	Mount Lemmon Survey	·	980 m	MPC · JPL
871952	2017 WL_{71}	—	May 20, 2015	Cerro Tololo	DECam	·	1.0 km	MPC · JPL
871953	2017 WN_{71}	—	November 21, 2017	Mount Lemmon	Mount Lemmon Survey	·	1.0 km	MPC · JPL
871954	2017 WW_{71}	—	November 24, 2017	Haleakala	Pan-STARRS 1	·	860 m	MPC · JPL
871955	2017 WO_{72}	—	November 16, 2017	Mount Lemmon	Mount Lemmon Survey	·	800 m	MPC · JPL
871956	2017 WL_{74}	—	November 21, 2017	Haleakala	Pan-STARRS 1	·	880 m	MPC · JPL
871957	2017 WE_{75}	—	November 26, 2017	Mount Lemmon	Mount Lemmon Survey	(5)	820 m	MPC · JPL
871958	2017 WL_{75}	—	November 24, 2017	Haleakala	Pan-STARRS 1	·	770 m	MPC · JPL
871959	2017 WZ_{75}	—	April 18, 2015	Cerro Tololo	DECam	·	710 m	MPC · JPL
871960	2017 WJ_{77}	—	November 22, 2017	Haleakala	Pan-STARRS 1	·	990 m	MPC · JPL
871961	2017 WA_{80}	—	November 21, 2017	Haleakala	Pan-STARRS 1	HNS	750 m	MPC · JPL
871962	2017 WR_{80}	—	November 17, 2017	Haleakala	Pan-STARRS 1	·	890 m	MPC · JPL
871963	2017 WM_{84}	—	September 6, 2008	Kitt Peak	Spacewatch	(5)	810 m	MPC · JPL
871964	2017 WV_{85}	—	November 24, 2017	Haleakala	Pan-STARRS 1	HNS	780 m	MPC · JPL
871965	2017 WY_{86}	—	November 26, 2017	Mount Lemmon	Mount Lemmon Survey	·	750 m	MPC · JPL
871966	2017 WN_{88}	—	July 3, 2008	Mount Lemmon	Mount Lemmon Survey	·	850 m	MPC · JPL
871967	2017 WM_{90}	—	November 21, 2017	Haleakala	Pan-STARRS 1	·	1.3 km	MPC · JPL
871968	2017 WJ_{91}	—	November 18, 2017	Haleakala	Pan-STARRS 1	·	1.9 km	MPC · JPL
871969	2017 WP_{91}	—	November 18, 2017	Haleakala	Pan-STARRS 1	EOS	1.2 km	MPC · JPL
871970	2017 WD_{92}	—	November 21, 2017	Haleakala	Pan-STARRS 1	·	2.0 km	MPC · JPL
871971	2017 WU_{100}	—	January 28, 2006	Kitt Peak	Spacewatch	·	800 m	MPC · JPL
871972	2017 XB_{2}	—	December 8, 2017	Mount Lemmon	Mount Lemmon Survey	AMO	730 m	MPC · JPL
871973	2017 XZ_{3}	—	September 30, 2006	Mount Lemmon	Mount Lemmon Survey	·	1.5 km	MPC · JPL
871974	2017 XT_{4}	—	April 18, 2015	Cerro Tololo	DECam	·	1 km	MPC · JPL
871975	2017 XD_{6}	—	October 28, 2017	Haleakala	Pan-STARRS 1	V	450 m	MPC · JPL
871976	2017 XJ_{6}	—	October 10, 2008	Mount Lemmon	Mount Lemmon Survey	·	1.1 km	MPC · JPL
871977	2017 XE_{8}	—	October 9, 2004	Kitt Peak	Spacewatch	·	1.0 km	MPC · JPL
871978	2017 XT_{8}	—	October 23, 2017	Mount Lemmon	Mount Lemmon Survey	H	310 m	MPC · JPL
871979	2017 XR_{9}	—	January 16, 2015	Haleakala	Pan-STARRS 1	·	740 m	MPC · JPL
871980	2017 XD_{16}	—	December 14, 2006	Kitt Peak	Spacewatch	·	830 m	MPC · JPL
871981	2017 XH_{17}	—	September 28, 2006	Mount Lemmon	Mount Lemmon Survey	·	650 m	MPC · JPL
871982	2017 XZ_{17}	—	November 8, 2013	Mount Lemmon	Mount Lemmon Survey	·	1.2 km	MPC · JPL
871983	2017 XP_{20}	—	January 24, 2014	Haleakala	Pan-STARRS 1	·	1.1 km	MPC · JPL
871984	2017 XZ_{20}	—	September 3, 2010	Mount Lemmon	Mount Lemmon Survey	·	500 m	MPC · JPL
871985	2017 XM_{21}	—	September 10, 2007	Kitt Peak	Spacewatch	·	480 m	MPC · JPL
871986	2017 XS_{23}	—	September 22, 2012	Kitt Peak	Spacewatch	AGN	840 m	MPC · JPL
871987	2017 XQ_{24}	—	October 30, 2017	Haleakala	Pan-STARRS 1	·	1.0 km	MPC · JPL
871988	2017 XK_{27}	—	April 18, 2015	Cerro Tololo	DECam	MAR	670 m	MPC · JPL
871989	2017 XV_{29}	—	August 28, 2011	Siding Spring	SSS	·	2.5 km	MPC · JPL
871990	2017 XD_{30}	—	October 30, 2017	Haleakala	Pan-STARRS 1	·	1.1 km	MPC · JPL
871991	2017 XM_{31}	—	November 19, 2006	Lulin	LUSS	T_{j} (2.98)	2.6 km	MPC · JPL
871992	2017 XM_{32}	—	December 8, 2017	Haleakala	Pan-STARRS 1	·	560 m	MPC · JPL
871993	2017 XA_{35}	—	November 30, 2010	Mount Lemmon	Mount Lemmon Survey	NYS	670 m	MPC · JPL
871994	2017 XS_{36}	—	October 11, 2007	Kitt Peak	Spacewatch	·	480 m	MPC · JPL
871995	2017 XB_{37}	—	October 30, 2017	Haleakala	Pan-STARRS 1	·	450 m	MPC · JPL
871996	2017 XD_{37}	—	October 22, 2017	Mount Lemmon	Mount Lemmon Survey	EUN	890 m	MPC · JPL
871997	2017 XV_{37}	—	September 22, 2017	Haleakala	Pan-STARRS 1	·	1.2 km	MPC · JPL
871998	2017 XR_{38}	—	April 19, 2015	Cerro Tololo	DECam	·	760 m	MPC · JPL
871999	2017 XM_{40}	—	October 28, 2017	Mount Lemmon	Mount Lemmon Survey	·	820 m	MPC · JPL
872000	2017 XH_{41}	—	October 23, 2013	Mount Lemmon	Mount Lemmon Survey	NYS	860 m	MPC · JPL

back to top
